= Afanasy Seredin-Sabatin =

Russian architect

Afanasy Ivanovich Seredin-Sabatin
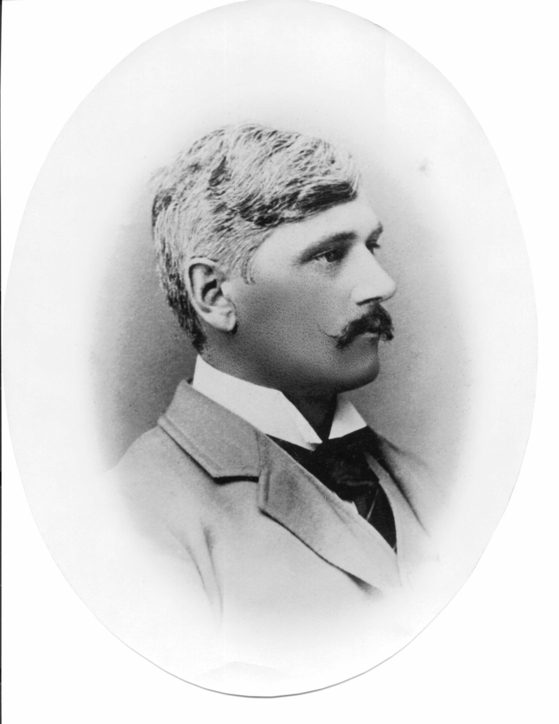
- Born: January 1, 1860; Lubny, Poltava, Russian Empire
- Died: January 1, 1921 (aged 61)
- Occupation: Architect
- Buildings: Russian Legation

Afanasy Ivanovich Seredin-Sabatin (Афанасий Иванович Середин-Сабатин; 1 January 1860 – 1 January 1921) was a Russian steersman-pilot and reporter for an English newspaper, but is best known as the first European (Russian) architect to live and work in Joseon and the Korean Empire. He is also notable for being the only foreigner to witness the assassination of Queen Min by Japanese ronin in 1895.

Seredin-Sabatin resided in Korea from 1883 to 1904, and built a number of European-style palace buildings within the city of Seoul, along with the first Russian legation building. The latter is a notable historical site from the period immediately before the Japanese occupation of Korea because King Gojong and his son found asylum there for a year following Queen Min's death.

== Biography ==
Ancestry

Seredin-Sabatin’s father, Ivan Vassilievich Seredin-Sabatin, was of noble birth, born part of the gentry in the province of Poltava, Ukraine, where his family owned an estate with serfs. They lived in the town of Lubny, in the same province, where they also owned properties.

Seredin-Sabatin’s mother (name unknown) was Ivan Vassilievich’s first wife. She was a Ukrainian commoner descended from Zaporozhian Cossacks living along the Dnieper River, Ukraine.

Life

Afanasy Ivanovich Seredin-Sabatin was born in Lubny, Poltava, Ukraine, in 1860. While he was still very young his father remarried. His stepmother was cruel towards him, so at the age of 14 he went to live with his uncle in Petrograd.

Seredin-Sabatin attended the Petrograd Academy of Arts for a year. He also attended an architectural university (it is unknown which one). However, soon before graduating, he purportedly had a falling out with a professor and left the university. With no certificate proving his graduation, he was unable to find work as an architect. Later he entered a Sea Cadet Corps school. Upon graduation, he became steersman-pilot of a Russian vessel in the Far East. It was there that he met his future wife.

His wife, Lydia Christianovna Shalich, was of Polish-German origin and was born in Galicia, Russian Empire. She had a very good contralto voice, often singing in concerts, and was also a good swimmer and hiker. Lydia educated their four children. She died in 1936, at the age of 69, in Shanghai, China.

Seredin-Sabatin spent some time at sea in the Far East until his arrival in Korea in 1883, where he was hired by Paul Georg von Möllendorff to manage construction work. He also worked as a customs officer in Incheon before he traveled to Seoul in 1888.

Once in Korea, Seredin-Sabatin learned that the Korean King Gojong was seeking a European architect to build a number of buildings on palace grounds. The king was interested in Western culture, and it apparently mattered little to him that Seredin-Sabatin did not have a degree in architecture. So Seredin-Sabatin gave up life at sea to instead live and work long-term in Korea.

Later, and while still in the Far East, Seredin-Sabatin mastered the English language and worked for a while as a reporter for an English newspaper. Seredin-Sabatin also built several summer homes in China and other countries.

After the assassination of Queen Min, Seredin-Sabatin left Korea to stay in China from 1895 to 1899; however, he returned to Korea to continue working on architecture projects.

Soon after the Russo-Japanese War (1904–05) he suffered from a type of nervous disorder and again quit Korea, leaving behind his family, which consisted of his wife, four daughters, and one son. Seredin-Sabatin moved first to Vladivostok, Siberia, then to European Russia, where he died in 1921. The place of his death is uncertain. It was either at Rostov-on-the-Don, or Volgograd (former Tsaritsin) on the Volga.

Seredin-Sabatin was fond of hunting with a 10 caliber double-barreled shotgun. He was an excellent swimmer (having saved several people from drowning), an accomplished tennis player, and an indefatigable hiker. He was irresponsible, and despite his many talents, his family very often found themselves in dire financial straits.

== Achievements in Korea ==
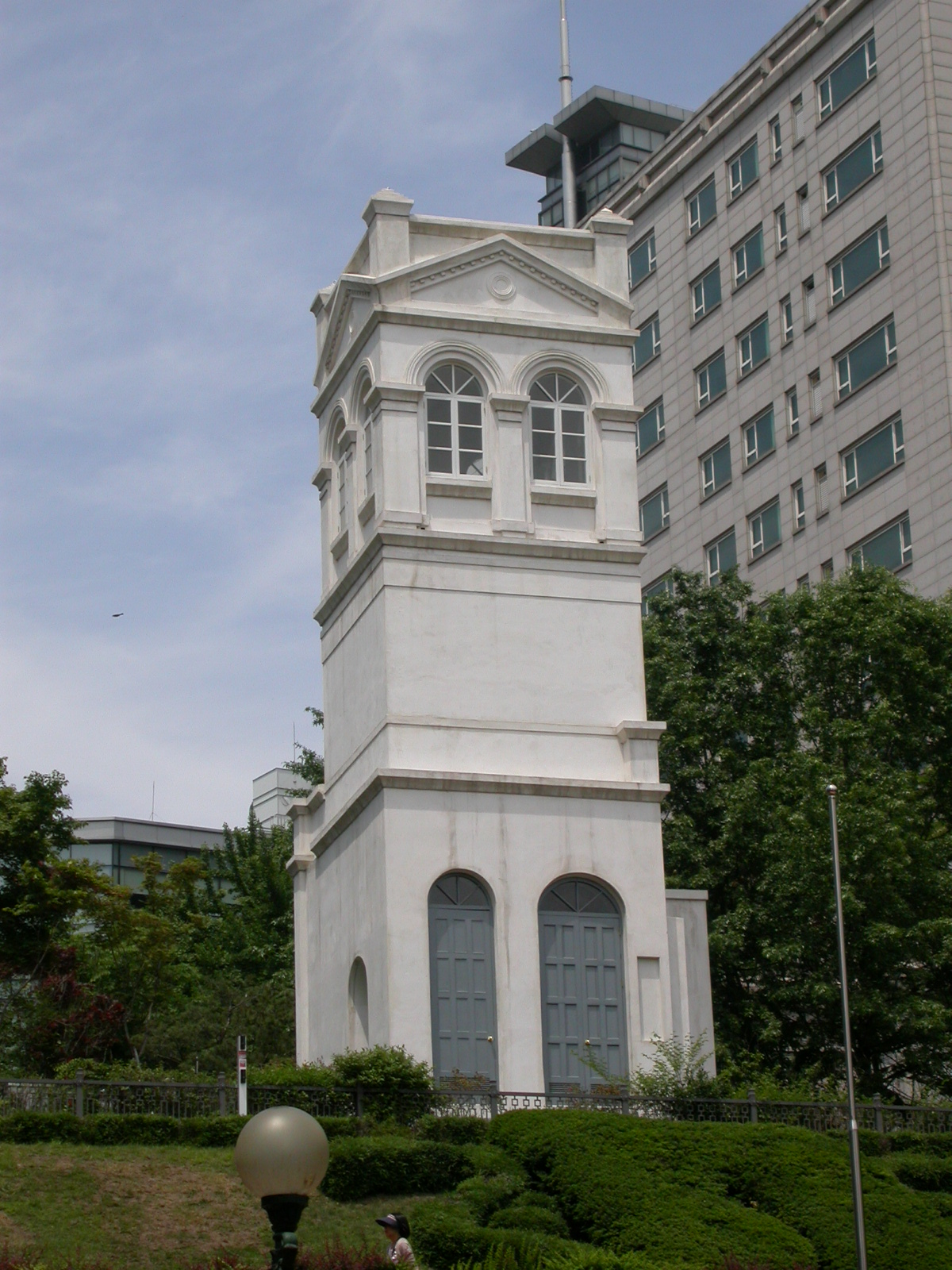
The first Russian Legation building remains known for the king's exile in 1896

According to a curator at the Cultural Heritage Administration (CHA) of South Korea, about 12 Western-style buildings are believed to be works of Seredin-Sabatin. He likely designed or participated in the construction of Dongnimmun (Independence Gate), Jungmyeongjeon and Dondeokjeon Halls at Deoksugung (덕수궁), the Chemulpo Club in Incheon, and the Sontag Hotel in Seoul.

However, only two buildings in Korea can be confirmed as his achievements.

- A building in the north of Gyeongbokgung (경복궁) called Gwanmungak (관문각), which served as the king's study. It was a 3-story Western building that has since been destroyed.
- Former Russian legation building, which is one of the Historic Sites of South Korea designated on 22 November 1977.

== Eyewitness to the assassination of Queen Min (Empress Myeongseong) ==
On 8 October 1895, Empress Myeongseong (referred to as "Queen Min") was assassinated by Japanese agents. It was the Japanese minister to Korea, Miura Gorō, who orchestrated the plot against her. In 2001, Russian reports on the assassin were found in the archives of the Foreign Ministry of the Russian Federation. The documents included the testimony of King Gojong, several witnesses of the assassination, and Karl Ivanovich Weber's report to Prince Alexei Lobanov-Rostovsky, the Foreign Minister of Russia. Weber was the chargé d'affaires at the Russian legation in Seoul at that time.

The sole Russian eyewitness, Seredin-Sabatin, was working at the time as a guard inside Gyeongbokgung. He was present when a group of Japanese agents and members of the Hullyŏndae army entered the royal palace, killed Empress Myeongseong, and desecrated her body in the north wing of the palace. She was forty-three years old at the time of her assassination.

Reacting to the murder, the king's father Heungseon Daewongun returned to the royal palace on the same day. On 11 February 1896, King Gojong and his crown prince Sunjong moved from Gyeongbokgung to the Russian legation building in Seoul, from which they governed for about one year, an event known as the Agwan Pacheon incident.

== See also ==
- Russians in Korea
- Korea under Japanese rule
- Empress Myeongseong
