= Sontag Hotel =

1902–1917 hotel in Seoul, Korea

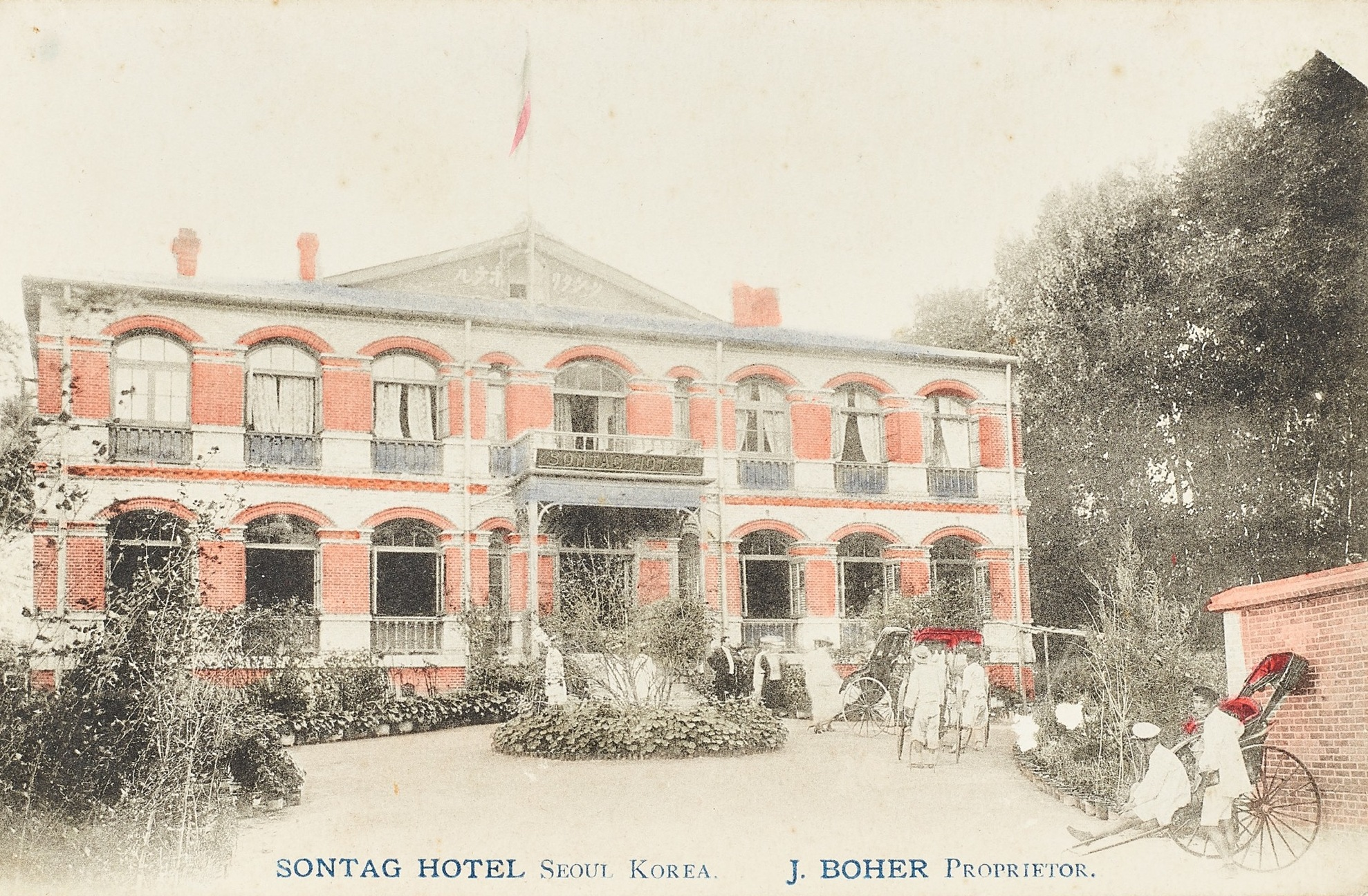
- The building on a postcard, some time after J. Boher assumed ownership in 1909
- Interactive map of the Sontag Hotel area

General information
- Coordinates: 37°34′8″N 126°58′30″E
- Completed: 1902
- Demolished: 1922

The Sontag Hotel (Korean: 손탁 호텔) was one of the earliest Western-style hotels in Korea. It operated between October 1902 and 1917 in Jung District, Seoul, Korean Empire and Korea under Japanese rule.

The hotel did not originally go by the name "Sontag Hotel". It was so nicknamed for its French proprietress Antoinette Sontag, who was a close confidant of the Korean monarchy. The hotel began to officially use that name in 1909.

The hotel hosted a number of people of contemporary and later importance, including later British Prime Minister Winston Churchill, and operated the first hotel dabang (cafe) in Korea. Sontag sold the hotel in 1909 and left Korea. It continued to operate until 1917, when it was again sold and converted into a school dormitory for Ewha Haktang. The building was demolished in 1922 and replaced with a larger dormitory.

The hotel and its original proprietress are remembered fondly in Korea, with both featuring in a number of recent works of historical fiction. There is currently a small memorial plaque dedicated to the hotel at its former site. The space is otherwise largely occupied by a memorial hall for the centennial anniversary of Ewha Womans University.

== History ==
=== Background ===
Antoinette Sontag arrived in Korea in 1885, along with her brother-in-law Russian emissary to Korea Karl Weber. At the time, Korea was still in its early stages of opening up to the world after centuries of isolationism. The Korean monarch Gojong and his wife Queen Min had a great need for people who could speak foreign languages. Sontag could speak English, German, French, and Russian, and quickly learned some Korean. Her skills were reportedly numerous beyond even that. She was reportedly an excellent cook: the king and queen came to prefer and regularly consume food and drink that she prepared. She also had a keen sense for art and design; the Korean monarchy had her redesign and decorate the interiors of their palaces. She was reportedly graceful and tactful, and organized and hosted a significant number of banquets on behalf of the Korean monarchy for foreign visitors. The combination of these factors gave her significant influence in the Korean court. In 1895, she was granted ownership of a hanok (traditional Korean house) at 29 Jeong-dong in Seoul, as thanks for her services.

After Queen Min was assassinated in October 1895, Sontag played a significant role in helping Gojong escape the palace into the Russian legation for safety. Her relationship with the king further improved during this period, and she often provided coffee to the king. The king built her a new five-room Western-style house in place of the hanok on March 16, 1898.

=== Creation ===
Korea was accepting an increasing number of foreign guests around this time, and space in guesthouses (especially with amenities that appealed to foreign visitors) was generally limited. Sontag rented out rooms in her house for several years. Eventually, the Korean government decided to demolish and replace the building yet again with a larger hotel. The new building finished completion in October 1902. It was designed by Russian architect Afanasy Seredin-Sabatin.

Sontag was made manager of the hotel, although the hotel and its operations were largely funded by the Korean government. It had two floors. The second floor was reserved for rooms of state or important guests. The first floor had rooms for regular guests, as well as a kitchen, restaurant, and coffee shop. The coffee shop, which can be considered a dabang (Korean conception of a cafe/teahouse), was the first hotel dabang in Korea.

The building did not officially go by the name "Sontag Hotel" until 1909; before then, it was variously called "Miss. Sontag's Residence" (손탁양저; 孃孫澤邸), "Sontag Guesthouse" (손탁빈관; 孃孫賓館), or "Hanseong Guesthouse" (한성빈관; 漢城賓館). The name "Sontag Hotel" developed among foreign visitors to Korea, and was eventually made its official name.

Several then and later famous people stayed at the hotel, including later British Prime Minister Winston Churchill, possibly American writer Mark Twain, and American writer Jack London. The Japanese Resident-General of Korea Itō Hirobumi used the hotel to accommodate his guests.

=== Later history and closure ===
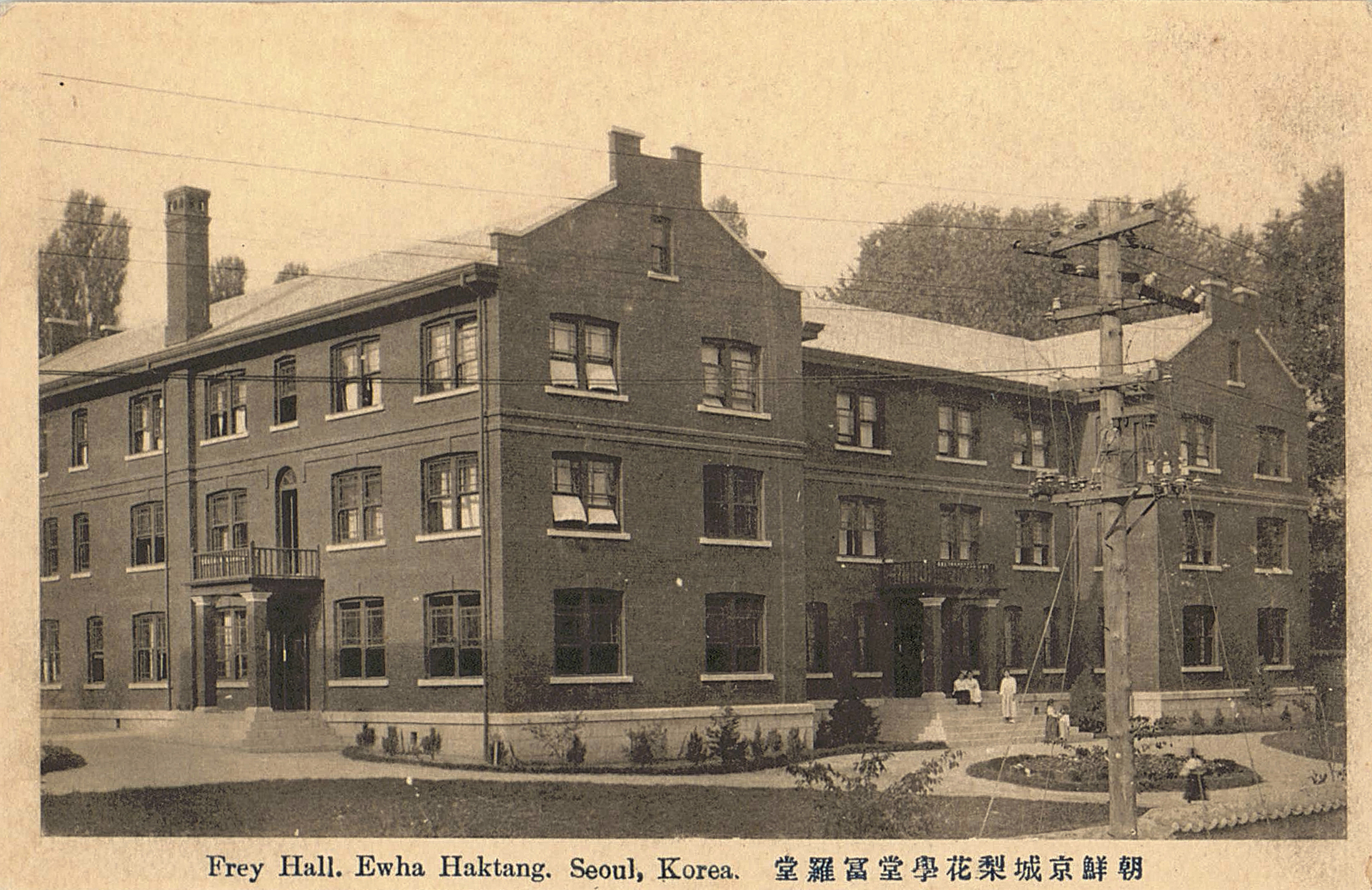
The Ewha Hakdang dorm built in place of the hotel

On August 3, 1909, Frenchman J. Boher assumed ownership over the hotel, and Sontag left Korea. The hotel continued to operate even after Japan annexed Korea in 1910.

Around the time of Boher's acquisition, the Sontag Hotel had 25 bedrooms (including some in an adjacent annex building) with electric lights, a garden, a bar, and a billiard room. In the main building, a single room cost 8 yen a night, while doubles costed 4 to 6 yen. Business reportedly possibly improved during this time, and the hotel, according to an advertisement, reportedly became crowded during the spring and fall. The hotel's reputation had been in decline since the late 1900s.

Boher had previously worked at the Nagasaki Hotel in Japan until around 1903 or 1904, and moved to Korea afterwards. He then became proprietor of the Palace Hotel, which was opposite to the main gate of the palace Deoksugung. In late 1914, he was called by the French government to return to France and serve in World War I. His subsequent fate is not known, but he did not return to Korea. The hotel's reputation reportedly continued to decline after his departure.

In 1917, Ewha Haktang purchased the hotel's building using donations it raised from the American Methodist Church ($23,060). It used the building as a school dormitory until 1922; after which the building was demolished and replaced with a larger dormitory called Frey Hall. That building burned down in 1975. Since 2006, there has been a centennial memorial hall for Ewha Womans University at the site of the hotel. A memorial plaque to the hotel is located at the site.

== In popular culture ==
- In 1976, Cha Bum-seok wrote a screenplay called "Sontag Hotel". Later in 2005, it was made into a musical.
- In 2012, Lee Soon-woo published a book on the hotel and Sontag entitled Sontag Hotel.
