= Siege of Jeonju Fortress =

Donghak Peasant Revolution conflict

- Part of Donghak Peasant Revolution
Date	April 27 – May 3, 1894
Location	Jeonju, South Jeolla, Korea
Result	Inconclusive

Belligerents
Donghak Peasant Army	Kingdom of Joseon: Joseon Army

Commanders and leaders
Jeon Bong-jun (WIA)	Hong Gye-hun

Strength
30,000	2,000

Casualties and losses
500	Minimal

The siege of Jeonju Fortress was a conflict in May 1894 that concluded the first revolt of the Donghak Peasant Revolution. The Donghak Peasant Army that won the Battle of Hwangryong River immediately aimed to capture Jeonju. In the early morning of April 27, the peasant army formed a line at Yongduchi overlooking Jeonju Fortress and prepared to advance. Already the day before, the peasant army that had beheaded Lee Hyo-eung, a messenger carrying a letter of appeasement from King Gojong, and Bae Eun-hwan were filled with solemn determination. After throwing the messenger and messenger sent by the king onto the corpse. They occupied Jeonju Fortress with little resistance, which was what is known as a bloodless occupation as Jeonju Castle was in a defenseless state. Around Jeonju Castle, from April 28th to May 3rd in 1894, there were various battles between the Garrison Army led by Hong Gye-hun and the peasant army. After losing the Battle of Wansan, the Joseon government concluded the first revolt of the Donghak Peasant Revolution with the Jeonju Treaty (전주 화약).

== Background ==
In order to handle the aftermath of the Gobu Peasant Uprising, Yi Yong-tae (이용태) was appointed as the peace envoy. When Yi Yong-tae suppressed the Donghak followers, Jeon Bong-jun (전봉준, 1855-1895) and the Donghak leaders proclaimed the Changui Gate Declaration in Muan County, Gochang, in April 1893, calling for the punishment of corrupt officials and the protection of the nation and the people, and initiated an uprising.

When the Donghak Peasant Army occupied the Jeolla Province, the government appointed Hong Gye-hun (홍계훈, ?-1895) as the commander-in-chief on April 2nd and ordered the suppression of the Donghak Peasant Army. Hong Gye-hun led an army of about 800 soldiers from the Strong Defense Guards and entered Jeonju Castle on April 7th. However, he determined that his forces were insufficient to suppress the Donghak Peasant Army and requested additional troops from the government. Accepting Hong Gye-hun's suggestion, the government dispatched troops from Ganghwado to Jeonju on the 16th. After confirming the reinforcement of government forces, Hong Gye-hun left Jeonju Castle on April 18th and attempted to suppress the Donghak Peasant Army but suffered a defeat in Jangseong on the 23rd. In response to the defeat in Jangseong, the government appointed Lee Won-hoe (이원회) as the Yanghosunbyeonsa (Commander of the Yangho) on April 27th and sent additional troops from Ganghwa and Cheongju.

On April 26, the peasant army arrived at Wonpyeong again after passing through Jeongeup and Taein. This was the front yard of Jeon Bong-jun, Kim Gae-nam, and Kim Deok-myeong and the base of the peasant army. In Wonpyeong, the peasant army again beheaded Lee Ju-ho, a propaganda officer, in the marketplace who had been captured while coming to deliver the 10,000 nyang in royalties bestowed by King Gojong to the government army. Considering Jeon Bong-jun's usual actions and military orders, it was an unusually determined act. Records say that the dynasty was taken lightly after defeating the light army that came down from Seoul, but the spirit of the peasant army that declared war against the Joseon dynasty was indeed fierce.

On April 27th, after Hwangryong, a royal messenger came to Jeon with bribes to quell the rebellion. Jeon killed the messenger, but took the needed money. The Donghak Peasant Army continued its momentum and turned north passing through Jeongeup, Taein, and Geumgu and occupied Jeonju, the largest city in Jeolla province at the time instead of choosing to take Naju to the south.

== Occupation of Jeonju ==
On the morning of April 27th, in the year of Gapo, the peasant army of 30,000 rebels, who had spent the night in Samcheon, under the command of General Jeon Bong-jun, began their attack on Jeonju Castle early in the morning. The peasant army, arranged in a formation centered around Yongmeori, observed the situation inside and outside the castle and finally launched the attack on Jeonju Castle around noon. It happened to be a day when the market was held outside the western gate. The peasant army infiltrated the marketplace disguised as traders. There were a lot more merchants than usual so it was easy to blend in, and loud gunshots began to explode one after another from Yongmeori Pass. It was a cannon fired by the peasant army. The merchants, startled by the sound of the guns, frantically pushed into the west and south gates, and the peasant soldiers also entered the fortress with them and started shooting. The peasant army attacked from the west, south, and north gates, except for the east gate, and broke the western gate with captured cannons from the Changseong Battle. Soon, the castle gate opened, and Jeon Bong-jun took over Seonhwadang, the office of the governor of Jeolla.

"Donghaksa" vividly records the scene of the peasant army entering Jeonju Castle as follows:

"The Donghak army, mixed with peddlers, had already entered the market square. When the time came, cannons from the artillery post at the opposite side of the market square near Yongmeori exploded, and thousands of guns simultaneously fired, covering the battlefield. The peddlers lost their senses and became chaotic, rushing into the western and southern gates like a flood. The Donghak army mixed with them and entered the castle gate, shouting and firing guns. The soldiers guarding the western gate were too busy fleeing. In an instant, there were shouts of the Donghak army inside the castle and outside the castle. General Jeon calmly led his troops and entered through the western gate, taking his position at Seonhwadang..."

The soldiers guarding Jeonju Fortress barely fired a single cannonball before running away. Kim Mun-hyeon, the governor of Jeolla, had already been dismissed as of April 18th, and Kim Hak-jin, who was appointed as his successor to handle "Supervisory Negotiations and Trade Affairs," had not yet taken office. The military forces under the Garrison Army were under the authority of Cho To-sa Hong Gye-hun, so Jeonju Castle was practically disarmed.

Amidst the chaos, Chamberlain Jang Hyo-won, with the portrait of King Taejo, which was enshrined in Gyeonggijeon, wrapped around his waist, and holding the ancestral tablet of the Jeonju Yi clan belonging to Yi Han, rushed to Wibongsanseong. Only Minister Min Young-seung, who was fleeing alone, discovered Chamberlain Jang Hyo-won and quickly handed over his horse, and they both proceeded to Wibongsa Daewoongjeon. It was an act of nobility aimed at later seeking exemption from the crime of abandoning the castle.

Governor Kim Mun-hyeon, without caring about his dignity, discarded his official robe and fled to Gongju wearing tattered clothes and straw shoes. It was not only Kim Mun-hyeon who escaped. Jung Yeong-jang, Im Tae-doo, and Min Young-seung, among others, were busy trying to save their own lives. He appeared in Gongju on April 29th, and told the government of the fall of Jeonju. Unable to control the rebellion, the government of Joseon formally requested the military assistance from both Japan and China. On 3 May, 1,500 Qing Dynasty forces appeared in Incheon. The same day, 6,000 Japanese forces also landed in Incheon. The Japanese inquired why Qing had not notified the Japanese government in accordance to the Convention of Tientsin, and soon caused the First Sino-Japanese War.

Jeon Bong-jun, stationed in Seonhwadang, reorganized the peasant army, firmly defended the four gates, and established discipline to rectify the disorder within the peasant army. They trained in swordsmanship and martial arts inside the castle and collected fabrics, discarding their winter clothes that had not been changed for a long time and making new summer clothes.

== Siege ==
The soldiers of Hong Gye-hun, who had been chasing after them for about 500 ri, reached Wansan on the outskirts of Jeonju Castle only after Jeonju Castle fell. They were late to arrive in Jeonju Castle and only arrived on the day of its fall, the 27th. Hong Gye-hun, upon hearing the report that the peasant army had crossed Galjae and headed for Jeongeup after the defeat in the Changseong Battle, did not immediately depart but stayed in Yeonggwang. It was not until the 25th that he finally departed from Yeonggwang, passing through Gochang and Jeongeup, and arrived in Geumgu. Upon hearing the news that Jeonju Castle had fallen into the hands of the rebel army, Hong Gye-hun reported to the central government that "there were many collaborators in the local government who supported the rebel army." He deployed over 2,000 soldiers to the mountains and gates around the castle to prevent the peasant army from contacting and escaping. The Donghak Peasant Army engaged in repeated battles with government forces near Jeonju Castle from April 28th to May 3rd.

The government army, located in a geographically advantageous location, was armed with imported state-of-the-art rifles such as Snider–Enfield, Mausers, and Martini-Henry rifles. These rifles, which boasted the world's highest performance at the time, were capable of accurately aiming and shooting. However, the peasant army only had matchlocks and spears and swords, and since they did not have bamboo spears, some even carried clubs. It took nearly ten minutes for the matchlock gun to load the next shot after firing one shot, and it was useless on rainy or humid days. The combat power of the person holding the gun could not be said to be any higher than that of the bamboo spear.

On 1 May, Hong Gyehun began to fire cannons into Jeonju, killing and burning civilians and civilian properties. On 2 May however, King Taejo of Joseon's portrait was burned down by Hong's incessant bombing, ceasing the attack. From then on, a push-and-push fight took place for several days between the peasant army that came out of the castle and the government army that surrounded the castle. The peasant army's tactics were unfavorable to the terrain. Jangtae could not play a big role in the fight to push up against the government forces that occupied high ground. Three or four battles followed, with more casualties for the peasant army. Hong Gye-hun spread a message in the castle saying that anyone who could capture Jeon Bong-jun would receive a large reward, and in several battles, some of the peasant army, fearful of the government army's firepower, became agitated. In fact, the combat power between the two forces was incomparable.

=== Battle of Wansan ===
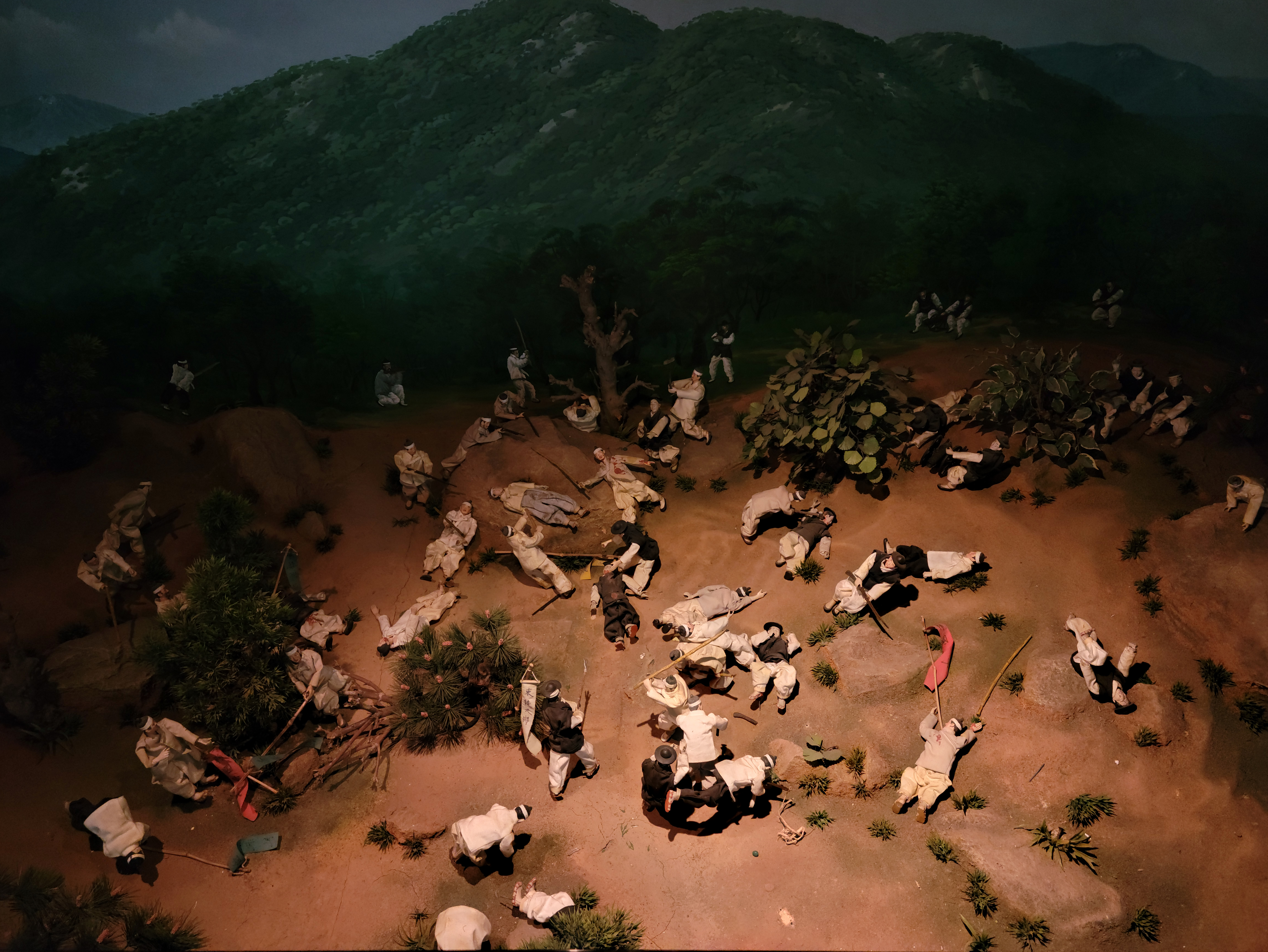
Mock-up of the battle of Wansan

In the morning of 3 May, in order to penetrate the main camp of the government camp in Wansan, the peasant army's desperate tactic was to advance in a straight line, unable to see front or back, but only to the left and right. They were made to run only looking ahead without looking to see who would fall after being shot. The peasant army charged from the west and north gates, attacking the Garrison Army, who were camping near Samagyo and Yuyeondae. The peasant army pursued the retreating Kyungun and occupied Daga Mountain. They advanced further, crossing Yongmeori Pass, and approached the headquarters of the government army.

Jeon led an attack on Hong's camp, but was defeated by superior firepower. The Jangtae only hindered the rebels in Jeonju's mountainous location. Jeon himself had a shrapnel lodged in his shoulder and a gunshot wound to the leg. General Kim Sun-myeong and Lieutenant Jeongsoo Lee Bok-yong, who were running ahead, lost their lives in the belief that attaching an amulet with the word Gung-eul would avoid bullets, but they were unable to break through the main camp. In this battle, about 500 peasant soldiers were killed and they were finally forced to retreat to Jeonju Castle.

The morale of the peasant army plummeted. The occupation of Jeonju Castle ended up being trapped in Jeonju Castle. There was no response from the Hoseo peasant army that had been so eagerly awaited. They also lost the battle and were unable to run to Jeonju Castle. Choi Si-hyeong's Bukjeop had already seen the Battle of Hwangnyong River and did not respond favorably to Namjeop, considering it to be a radical force. Moreover, as more than ten days passed, the food in the castle was running out.

== Treaty of Jeonju ==
On 7 May, Kim Hak-jin, the new administrator of Jeonju, ordered Hong to make peace with the rebels. The rebels, suffering from lack of food, accepted. (Note: During the siege, the rebels invented a cuisine that became known as Jeonju bibimbap) This came to be called the Treaty of Jeonju (全州和約) or Jeonju Truce. Hong accepted twelve rebel requests:

1. Accept the Donghak religion.
2. Punish corrupt officials.
3. Punish those who became illegally rich.
4. Punish corrupt Yangban and Seonbi.
5. Free all slaves.
6. Free the Cheonmin class, and cease the branding of butchers.
7. Legalize the remarriage of widows.
8. Lower taxes.
9. Pick politicians based on qualities, not families.
10. Punish those who cooperate with the Empire of Japan.
11. Illegalize debts.
12. Give their land to all peasants.

Following the truce, the rebels climbed out of the fortress using ladders, and Hong entered the empty fortress.

Both sides celebrated their 'victory'. Hong held a feast with his soldiers inside Jeonju Fortress, while the rebels sang the Geomgyeol, a Donghak religious hymn which begins:

Good times, good times, these are good times. These are the best times to come. What must be done if not to use the Thousand Dragons Blade.

== Aftermath ==
The occupation of Jeonju Castle was the peasant army's greatest victory and final victory during the Donghak Peasant Revolution. Jeonju was the birthplace of the Joseon Dynasty and the heart of Jeolla Province, as well as the leading city in the Honam region. Therefore, the occupation of Jeonju Castle by the peasant army greatly shocked the central government. The occupation of Jeonju Gamyeong meant the control of Jeolla Province and according to the provided text, the occupation of Jeonju Castle took place on April 27th in the year of Gapo during the Donghak Peasant Revolution. The peasant army, led by General Jeon Bong-jun, launched an attack on Jeonju Castle early in the morning. The castle was in a defenseless state as the governor had been dismissed, and the military forces were under the authority of someone else. The peasant army attacked from the west, south, and north gates, broke the western gate using captured cannons, and entered the castle. General Jeon Bong-jun took over Seonhwadang, the office of the governor of Jeolla. The governor and other officials fled to save their lives. Chamberlain Jang Hyo-won, with important artifacts, rushed to Wibongsanseong. Jeon Bong-jun reorganized the peasant army, defended the four gates, and established discipline. The soldiers chasing the peasant army arrived late at Jeonju Castle. The occupation of Jeonju Castle was a significant victory for the peasant army and had a major impact on the central government.

Meanwhile, the Qing dynasty, which accepted Korea's request for military assistance, landed in Asan Bay on May 5th and 7th to suppress the Donghak Peasant Army. As the Qing army deployed, Japan also landed its troops at Chemulpo on May 6th, based on the Treaty of Tianjin. To avoid giving reasons for the Qing dynasty and Japan to station their troops, Jeon Bong-jun presented a reform proposal to the government, stating that if the government accepted it, the Donghak Peasant Army would disband. By accepting Jeon Bong-jun's proposal, Hong Gye-hun and the government army concluded the Jeonju Treaty on May 7th. Under the Jeonju Treaty, the Donghak Peasant Army and the government agreed to establish a local governance organization called Jibgangso to oversee reform affairs in the Jeolla Province and agreed to disband the peasant army in exchange for implementing the reform proposal presented by the peasant army. Immediately after the conclusion of the Jeonju Treaty, the Donghak Peasant Army withdrew from Jeonju Castle and established Jibgangso to promote reform.

== Sources ==
- Choe, Sihyeong (1862). 용담 유사 : 수운 가사 [Yongdam Yusa] (in Korean). 대원 출판사, Daewon Publisher. ISBN 8972616087.
- Boulger, Demetrius Charles; Hazeltine, Mayo W. (1893). "The War with Japan and Subsequent Events". China. Kessinger Publishing (reprint 2010). pp. 1–550. ISBN 9781-1633-3067-8.
- McClain, James L. (2002). Japan, a Modern History. New York: W.W. Norton & Company. pp. 1–724. ISBN 9780-3930-4156-9.
