= Yu Chang Chun =

Yu Changchun may refer to following individuals of which name in Chinese character can be transliterated to Hanyu Pinyin:

- 余长春 (Yú Chángchūn; born 1941), Chinese table tennis player
- 禹長春 (Yǔ Chángchūn; 1898–1959), Korean agricultural scientist and botanist
