= Hong Kyehun =

Korean military official (1842–1895)

- Born: 1842; Namyang-eup, Hwaseong, Gyeonggi Province, Joseon
- Died: 1895 (aged 52–53); Sejongno, Hanseong, Joseon
- Military career
- Allegiance: Joseon
- Branch: Joseon Army
- Rank: Lieutenant-Colonel
- Commands: Jang Wi-Young; Military Training Division; Capital Guards
- Conflicts: Imo Incident; Donghak Peasant Revolution; Japanese occupation of Gyeongbokgung Palace; Eulmi Incident

- Hong Kyehun
- Hangul: 홍계훈
- Hanja: 洪啓薰
- RR: Hong Gyehun
- MR: Hong Kyehun

Art name
- Hangul: 규산
- Hanja: 圭珊
- RR: Gyusan
- MR: Kyusan

Courtesy name
- Hangul: 성남
- Hanja: 聖南
- RR: Seongnam
- MR: Sŏngnam

Posthumous name
- Hangul: 충의
- Hanja: 忠毅
- RR: Chungui
- MR: Ch'ungŭi

Hong Kyehun (Korean: 홍계훈; 1842–1895) was a Joseon official of the late 19th century who served as lieutenant-colonel of the Jang Wi-Young, and the Military Training Division during the reign of King Gojong. He was known for his leading role in the Donghak Peasant Revolution and defending Queen Min during the Imo Incident and the Eulmi Incident.

Hong Kyehun's military career spanned several decades, and he played a significant role in the tumultuous period of late 19th-century Korea. He was known for his loyalty, discipline, and dedication to his duties. His rise from a musa to a commander exemplified the possibilities for social advancement and recognition within the military system of the time. Hong Kyehun's legacy as a military leader and his contributions to suppressing the Donghak Peasant Army are still remembered in Korean history, serving as a testament to the power of determination, skill, and strategic thinking in times of crisis that earned him the trust of King Gojong even when he died defending Queen Min during the Eulmi Incident.

== Early life and military service ==
His birthplace was Namyang (南陽), and his given name was Hong Chaehŭi (홍재희; 洪在羲). His courtesy name was Sŏngnam (성남; 聖南), and his art name was Kyusan (규산; 圭珊). Born in 1842, he was originally a "musa" (무사; 武士), a warrior belonging to the royal guard called "Muyech'ŏng" (무예청; 武藝廳), which was part of the royal palace. Despite being exceptionally skilled in martial arts, his social status as a mere "pyŏngjol" (병졸; 兵卒), or soldier, limited his opportunities for advancement.

=== Imo Incident ===
In 1882 (the 19th year of King Gojong's reign), when the Imo Incident broke out, he played a crucial role in rescuing Queen Min (later known as Empress Myeongseong) from the palace, and he was recognized for his contribution. After the rebellion was suppressed with the intervention of the Qing Army and Min returned, Hong Chaehŭi was promptly rewarded. It was due to his service in protecting Min. In August 1882, he was appointed as the magistrate of Pocheon, a local government position, transitioning from being a musa in the royal guard to a local official.

=== Advancement ===
In December 1884, he was appointed as the magistrate of Taean. In August 1885, he was promoted to the rank of Jeong 3-pum and became the military governor of Chungcheong Province. In September 1886, he was further promoted to the rank of Jong 2-pum and became the military governor of Chungcheong Province. In April 1888, King Gojong personally granted him a "tiger skin" as a sign of favor. In March 1899, he was appointed as the magistrate of Jangdan, steadily growing Hong Chaehŭi through various external positions.

In November 1899, he received an evaluation from the Ijo (吏曹) that stated, "Hong Chaehŭi has been performing his duties diligently, respecting public affairs and maintaining the law. In just four months since his appointment, everything has been going smoothly." Hong Chaehŭi, leveraging the prestige of King Gojong and Jungjeon Min, seized opportunities and walked the path of a "guardian" who demonstrated his abilities. While advancing through various external positions, Hong Chaehŭi was appointed to Lieutenant-Colonel of Jang Wi-yeong (壯衛營), a unit of the Capital Guards Command in 1890, and returned to the palace.

In May 1892, when followers of the Donghak religion gathered in Boeun, Chungcheong Province, and launched the movement against foreign influence, he led 600 of the Jang Wi-Young to march to Cheongju. Meanwhile, in January 1893, Hong Chaehŭi changed his name to Hong Gye-hoon.

== Donghak Peasant Revolution ==
In 1894, when the Donghak Peasant Revolution erupted, the government appointed Hong Kyehun as the military commander on April 2 and led 800 soldiers of the Jang Wi-Young to suppress the Donghak Peasant Army. He entered Jeonju Castle on April 7, he determined that his forces were insufficient to suppress the Donghak Peasant Army and requested reinforcements from the government. Accepting Hong Kyehun's proposal, the government dispatched additional troops from Ganghwado to Jeonju on the 16th. After confirming the deployment of government forces, Hong Kyehun left Jeonju Castle on April 18 and attempted to suppress the Donghak Peasant Army but suffered a defeat in Jangseong on the 23rd. Upon receiving the report of the defeat in Jangseong, the government appointed Yi Won-hoe as the Yangho Sunbyeonsa (Commander for the Pacification of the Two Provinces) on April 27 and sent additional forces from Ganghwa and Cheongju. After defeating the government forces in Jangseong, the Donghak Peasant Army continued to gain momentum and occupied Jeonju Castle on April 27, passing through Jeongeup, Taein, and Geumgu. Hong Kyehun quickly returned north, beginning the Siege of Jeonju Fortress.

On 1 May, Hong Kyehun began to fire cannons into Jeonju, killing and burning civilians and civilian properties. On 2 May however, King Taejo of Joseon's portrait was burned down by Hong's incessant bombing, ceasing the attack. In the morning of 3 May, Jeon led an attack on Hong's camp, but was defeated by superior firepower. The Jangtae only hindered the rebels in Jeonju's mountainous location. Jeon himself had a shrapnel lodged in his shoulder from this attack.

The Donghak Army suffered significant casualties in several battles with the government forces near Jeonju Castle from April 28 to May 3. Especially, in the battle on May 3, the Donghak Peasant Army suffered a significant loss of over 500 casualties.

=== Jeongju Treaty ===
Meanwhile, on 29 April, the administrator of Jeonju, Kim Mun-hyeon, had appeared in Gongju and told the government of the fall of Jeonju. Unable to control the rebellion, the government of Joseon formally requested the military assistance from both Japan and China. On 3 May, 1,500 Qing Dynasty forces appeared in Incheon. The same day, 6,000 Japanese forces also landed in Incheon. The Japanese inquired why Qing had not notified the Japanese government in accordance to the Convention of Tientsin, and soon caused the First Sino-Japanese War.

In the midst of this, the Qing military, which accepted Korea's request for reinforcements, landed in Asan Bay on May 5 and 7 to suppress the Donghak Peasant Army. As the Qing army took action, Japan also landed its troops at Jemulpo on May 6 based on the Treaty of Tianjin. On 7 May, Kim Hak-jin, the new administrator of Jeonju, ordered Hong to make peace with the rebels. The rebels, suffering from lack of food (Note: During the siege, the rebels invented a cuisine that became known as Jeonju bibimbap) , and feeling threatened by the Qing and Japanese forces advancing on Joseon, Jeon Bongjun exchanged letters with Hong Kyehun for a ceasefire.

The Donghak Army presented conditions related to 14 items. First, Hong Kyehun proposed several measures, including the abolition of the Transfer Office (전운소), cessation of land distribution and the payment of grain as taxes, prohibition of grain trade, and the Spring and Autumn Tribute System being reduced to two sheep per household. Each town would forcibly confiscate private farmland and distribute it among the peasants. They would burn documents related to ancestral rituals and allow widows to remarry. With these conditions, Hong Kyehun directly appealed to the sage and issued a certificate to the government, ensuring the safety of the Donghak Army.

This came to be called the Treaty of Jeonju (全州和約) or Jeonju Truce. Hong accepted twelve of the fourteen rebel requests. The peasant army withdrew without any bloodshed. The Donghak Peasant Army gained control over the Jeolla Province and the surrounding regions. Through the Jeonju Agreement, the Donghak Peasant Army and the government agreed to establish a governing body called "Jipgangso" to oversee reform affairs in the Jeolla Province and agreed to dissolve the Donghak Peasant Army in exchange for implementing the reform plan proposed by the peasants. Immediately after the Jeonju Agreement, the Donghak Peasant Army withdrew from Jeonju Castle and established Jipgangso to begin promoting reform.

=== Japanese occupation of Gyeongbokgung Palace ===
On July 23, 1894 at 4:30 am, the Imperial Japanese Army 9th Infantry Brigade assaulted Gyeongbokgung Palace as a result for requesting the Qing reinforcements. Hong Kyehun led the Royal Escort Palace Guards (Jangwiyeong; 장위영; 壯衛營) to defend the Geonchunmun, the Eastern Gate, and the Gwanghwamun, the Main Gate against them. 500 Mounted Guard Infantry (Giyeongbyeong; 기영병; 箕營兵) from Pyongyang defended the Yeongchumun and Sinmumun gates, but they were outnumbered by about four times as many regular Japanese troops.

At 5 am, they finally broke through and entered the palace gates and hung a long flag pole on the wall. The Japanese forced the Royal Escort Palace Guards and Mounted Guard Infantry to hide behind the pine trees and the palace walls to the left of Gwanghwamun, cutting them off from reinforcements. The guards were eventually overcome by superior Japanese numbers. The blood that flowed from the bullet holes in the bodies of the Joseon soldiers was said to lie red under the July morning sun. Yamaguchi detoured to the east, and west sides of Gyeongbokgung Palace rendezvoused with the troops who entered through Sinmumun to secure Hamhwadang residence. On arrival, he drew his sword, forcing Gojong to come out whilst claiming to protect him. Gojong commanded his guards to stop fighting. The Mounted Guards Infantry defending Yeongchumun surrendered 30 minutes later while the rest of the Capital Guards Command outside the palace complied in the late afternoon.

=== End of the Rebellion ===
Hong Kyehun launched a fierce offensive against the Donghak Peasant Army. With his well-trained troops and superior military tactics, he managed to regain control of Jeolla Province and push back the rebellion. The peasant army suffered heavy losses, and their momentum was broken. Hong Kyehun's success in suppressing the Donghak Peasant Army brought him great acclaim and solidified his position as a prominent military commander. He became known for his bravery, leadership, and strategic acumen. His achievements earned him the respect and trust of King Gojong and the royal court. He was promoted to the position of Training Division Commander for his role in breaking the spirit of the Donghak Peasant Army.

== Later military career ==
Hong Kyehun continued to serve in various military and administrative positions. He held important roles such as the commander of the Right Gyeongmu Gate (경무문) and the Left Gyeongmu Gate (좌경무문) in the royal palace. However, in early the following year, Hong Kyehun returned to the palace as the commander of the royal bodyguard, the Capital Guards and the Hullyeondae (Military Training Division), as Queen Min launched a political campaign to bring Russia in to restrain Japan. In July, he once again received tiger skin armor and reconfirmed his trust with King Gojong and Jungjeon. He collaborated with Yu Gil-jun and others to suppress pro-Japanese faction leader Park Yeong-hyo.

== Eulmi Incident ==
Convinced that Queen Min was conspiring with the Russians to bring their troops into the country, the Hullyeondae attacked the Imperial Palace on 8 October 1895 alongside 48 Japanese ronin and the Japanese Legation Security Group, in what came to be known as the Eulmi Incident. Hong heard gunshots from Gyeongbokgung Palace in the early morning of that day and realized that the palace had been infiltrated. He arrived at Gwanghwamun, leading 500 Palace Guards. As soon as they arrived, he blocked the gate to prevent the Japanese troops from invading. He drew his sword and scolded at the division, calling them "Traitors" and imploring them to leave immediately. At this shout, the Japanese ronin and division paused for a moment. However, they engaged in a firefight with the Palace Guards and pushed forward. He was shot six times and stabbed with a sword, forcing the Palace Guards to retreat and allow the ronin to push further and kill the Queen at the Okhoru Pavilion.

== Burial ==
He was posthumously promoted and given the title of Chujung (忠毅), and in 1900, he was enshrined at Jangchungdan along with Yi Gyeong-jik (李耕稙).

== In popular culture ==
- Park Hae-sang – 1982 Poongwoon KBS1 drama
- Hong Soon-chang – 1990 Daewongun (drama) MBC drama
- Kim Joo-young – 1995 Brilliant Dawn KBS1 drama
- Oh Jong-hyuk – 1995 The Last Empress Musical
- Jung Jun-ho – 2001 "When I Go" (music video)
- Hong Il-kwon – 2001 Empress Myeongseong KBS2 drama
- Hye Geun Ji – 2007 The Last Empress Musical
- Cho Seung-woo – 2009The Sword with No Name film
- Choi Woo-hyuk – 2018 The Last Empress Musical
- Yoon Seo-hyun – 2019 Nokdu Flower SBS drama
- Lee Chang-sub – 2021 The Last Empress Musical

== See also ==
- Donghak Peasant Revolution
- First Sino-Japanese War
- Joseon Army (late 19th century)
- Emperor Gojong
- Empress Myeongseong
- Imo Incident
- Japanese occupation of Gyeongbokgung Palace
- Eulmi Incident

== Bibliography ==
- McClain, James L. (2002). Japan, a Modern History. New York: W.W. Norton & Company. pp. 1–724. ISBN 9780-3930-4156-9.
- Boulger, Demetrius Charles; Hazeltine, Mayo W. (2015) [1893]. "The War with Japan and Subsequent Events". China. Creative Media Partners, LLC. pp. 1–550. ISBN 9781340225636.
