= Russia–Korea Treaty of 1884 =

1884 treaty between Russia and Korea

The Russia–Korea Treaty of 1884 was negotiated between representatives of Russia and Korea.

== Background ==
In 1876, Korea established a trade treaty with Japan after Japanese ships approached Ganghwado and threatened to fire on the Korean capital. Treaty negotiations with several Western countries were made possible by the completion of the initial Japanese overture.

In 1882, the Americans concluded a treaty and established diplomatic relations, which served as a template for subsequent negotiations with other Western powers.

== Terms ==
The Russians and Koreans negotiated and approved a multi-article treaty with provisions similar to those of other Western nations.

Ministers from Russia to Korea were appointed in accordance with the treaty: Karl Ivanovich Weber, appointed October 14, 1885; Alexey Shpeyer, appointed March 28, 1898; Paul Pavlov, appointed December 13, 1898.

The treaty remained in effect even after a Japanese protectorate was established over Korea in 1905.

== See also ==
- Unequal treaties
- List of Ambassadors from Russia to North Korea
- List of Ambassadors from Russia to South Korea
