= Assassination of Empress Myeongseong =

1895 murder in Seoul

Assassination of Queen Min
- Part of the prelude to the Japanese annexation of Korea
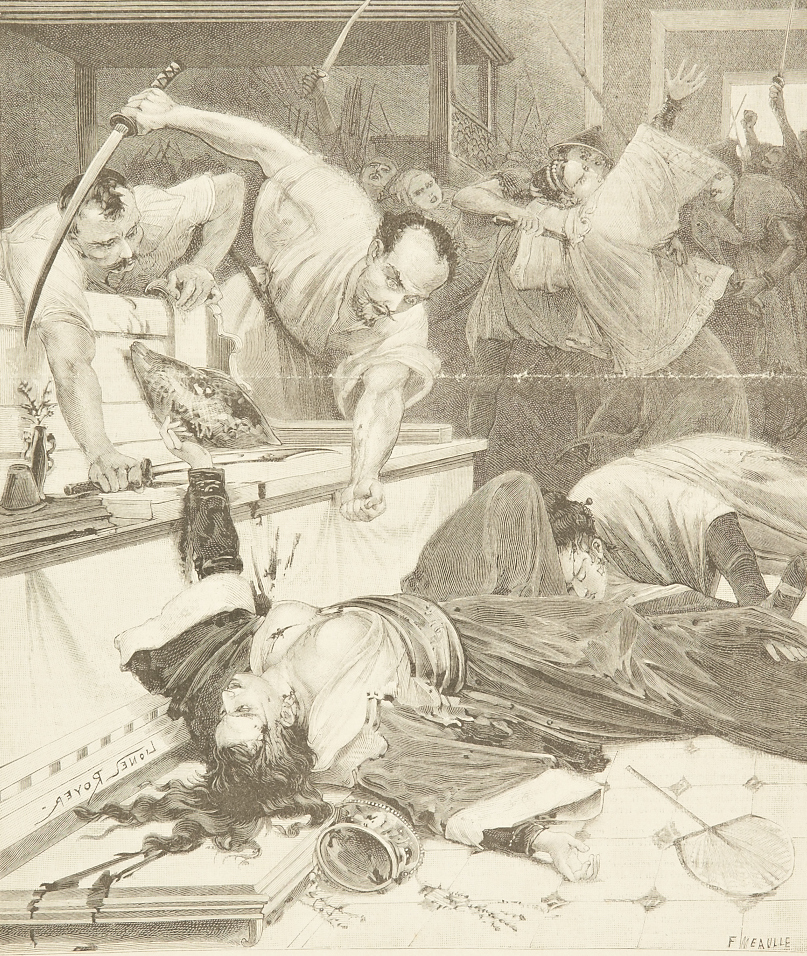
- Le Journal illustré cover depicting the assassination (1895)
| Date | 8 October 1895 |
| Location | Okhoru, Geoncheonggung, Gyeongbokgung, Seoul, Joseon 37.583138°N 126.977239°E |
| Result | Death of Queen Min |

Belligerents
| Japan | Korea |

Commanders and leaders
| Miura Gorō; Okamoto Ryūnosuke; Sugimura Fukashi; Sase Kumatetsu; Kunitomo Shigeaki; Nakamura Tateo; Niiro Tokisuke; Hirayama Iwahiko; Adachi Kenzō; U Pŏmsŏn; Yi Tuhwang | Gojong; Min X Hong Kyehun †; An Kyŏngsu; Yi Kyŏngjik †; Hyŏn Hŭngt'aek; William McEntyre Dye |

Units involved
| Imperial Japanese Army; Pro-Japanese collaborators | Korean Army |

Strength
| Japanese Legation Security Group; Hullyŏndae: 1,000; 48 continental ronin | Capital Guards (Siwidae): 300–400 |

Casualties and losses
- Unknown military casualties but many court ladies, eunuchs, and officials killed or wounded.

Around 6 a.m. on 8 October 1895, Queen Min, the consort of the Korean monarch Gojong, was assassinated by a group of Japanese agents under Miura Gorō. After her death, she was posthumously given the title of "Empress Myeongseong". The attack happened at the royal palace Gyeongbokgung in Seoul, Joseon. This incident is known in Korea as the Eulmi Incident. (Note: Korean: 을미사변; Hanja: 乙未事變. "Eulmi" is the name of the year the killing happened according to the sexagenary cycle.)

By the time of her death, the queen had acquired arguably more political power than even her husband. Through this process, she made many enemies and escaped a number of assassination attempts. Among her opponents were the king's father the Heungseon Daewongun, the pro-Japanese ministers of the court, and the Korean army regiment that had been trained by Japan: the Hullyŏndae. Weeks before her death, Japan replaced their emissary to Korea with a new one: Miura Gorō. Miura was a former military man who professed to being inexperienced in diplomacy, and reportedly found dealing with the powerful queen frustrating. After the queen began to align Korea with the Russian Empire to offset Japanese influence, Miura struck a deal with Adachi Kenzō of the newspaper Kanjō shinpō and possibly also the Daewongun to carry out her killing.

The agents were let into the palace by pro-Japanese Korean guards. Once inside, they beat and threatened the royal family and the occupants of the palace during their search for the queen. Women were dragged by the hair and thrown down stairs, off verandas, and out of windows. Two women suspected of being the queen were killed. When the queen was eventually located, her killer jumped on her chest three times, then cleaved her head with a sword. Some assassins looted the palace, while others covered her corpse in oil and burned it.

The Japanese government arrested the assassins on charges of murder and conspiracy to commit murder. Non-Japanese witnesses were not called, and the court disregarded evidence from Japanese investigators, who had recommended that the assassins be found guilty. The defendants were acquitted of all charges, despite the court acknowledging that the defendants had conspired to commit murder. Miura went on to have a career in the Japanese government, where he eventually became Minister of Communications.

The killing and trial sparked domestic and international shock and outrage. Sentiment shifted against Japan in Korea; the king fled for protection in the Russian legation and anti-Japanese militias rose throughout the peninsula. While the attack harmed Japan's position in Korea in the short run, it did not prevent Korea's eventual colonization in 1910.

== Historiography ==
The assassination is highly contentious in Korea, where it is remembered as a symbol of Japan's historical atrocities on the peninsula. Information about the assassination comes from a variety of sources, including the memoirs of some of the assassins, the testimonies of foreigners who witnessed varying parts of the attack, the testimonies of Korean eyewitnesses, investigations conducted by Japanese emissaries Uchida Sadatsuchi and Komura Jūtarō, and the verdicts of the trials of the assassins in Hiroshima. Evidence for the assassination is written in at least four languages: English, Korean, Japanese, and Russian.

For over a century now, scholars from various countries have analyzed varying portions of the body of evidence and have reached differing conclusions on significant issues. Evidence has continued to emerge even into the 21st century, which contributes to ongoing debate.

== Background ==
Since its forced opening by Japan in 1876, Korea had been subjected to a number of great powers competing for influence over it. Powers included the Empire of Japan, Qing China, the Russian Empire, and the United States. The strength of each of these powers in Korea changed frequently. Within the Korean government, various politicians, departments, and military units acted according to independent interests and alignments.

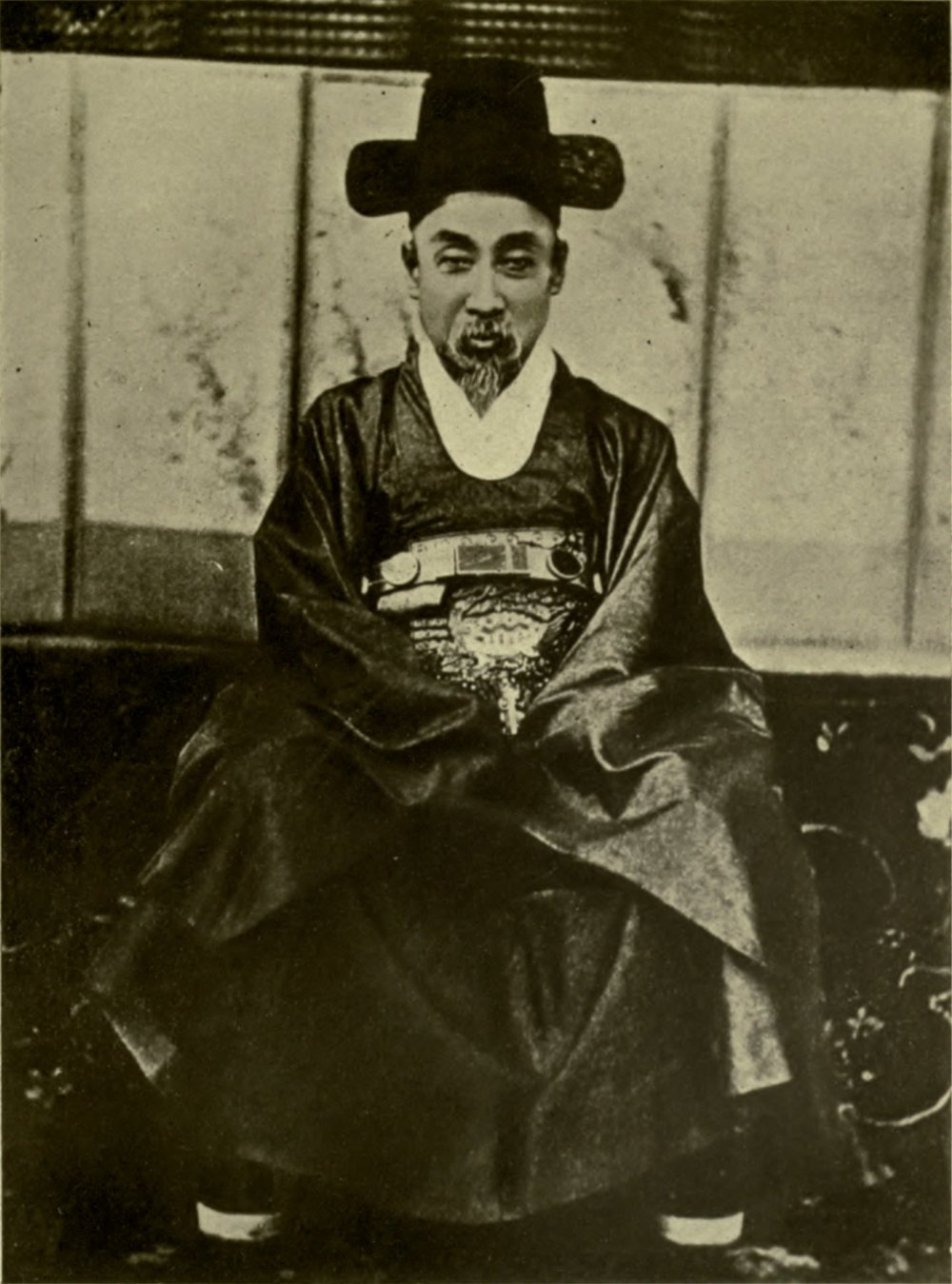
The Heungseon Daewongun (c. 1898)

One prominent faction was led by the father of King Gojong: the Heungseon Daewongun. The Daewongun, wanting a submissive and obedient wife for Gojong, selected an orphan of the prestigious Yeoheung Min clan for the role, and she became Queen Min. She was widely agreed to be politically savvy and sharp, and she began consolidating power. According to observers, she came to wield even more political power than her husband. The queen forced the Daewongun into retirement, and replaced his allies with her own. The Daewongun and queen developed a fierce rivalry. Her gender also played a role in how she was perceived; in both Japan and Korea at that time, women were expected to be relatively secluded and it was uncommon for them to hold significant political power.

The combination of these factors made her the target of retaliation. Both the Daewongun and the Japanese became involved in efforts to suppress her power. Assassination attempts were made against her in the 1882 Imo Incident and 1884 Gapsin Coup. In 1894, the Daewongun struck a deal with Japanese military leader Ōtori Keisuke to purge the queen and her allies, but the plot failed, and the queen regained her influence.

=== Sōshi and the Kanjō shinpō ===
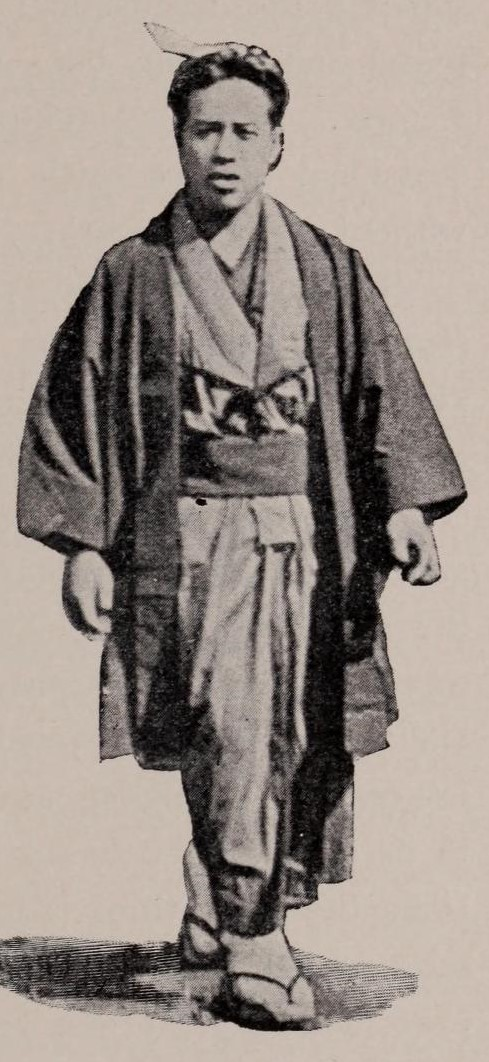
A 1904 depiction of a sōshi

Beginning around the 1860s, groups of young men called sōshi (壮士) emerged in Japan and engaged in political violence. They were seen in Japan as violent thugs and looked down upon. They were the product of groups such as the shishi and rebel Satsuma Army. Beginning in the 1880s, a number of them moved to Korea. In Korea, they had the right of extraterritoriality and were thus unbound by Korean law. They, in nationalist groups such as Tenyūkyō and Kokuryūkai, acted with impunity especially in the countryside.

A number of the sōshi became journalists, and became associated with various Japanese newspapers in Korea, namely the Kanjō shinpō. This newspaper and its employees later became central to the assassination plot.

=== Instability and the Hullyŏndae ===
Around 1894, Korea suffered from significant internal instability. The Donghak Peasant Revolution and First Sino-Japanese War for control over Korea concurrently took place on the peninsula. Around this time, the Japanese trained their own battalions of Koreans on the peninsula: the Hullyŏndae. Much of the Hullyŏndae were loyal to Japan, and developed a strained relationship with the other Korean security forces. This led to a number of violent clashes between them.

== Developing the plot ==
=== Sōshi advocacy for the assassination ===
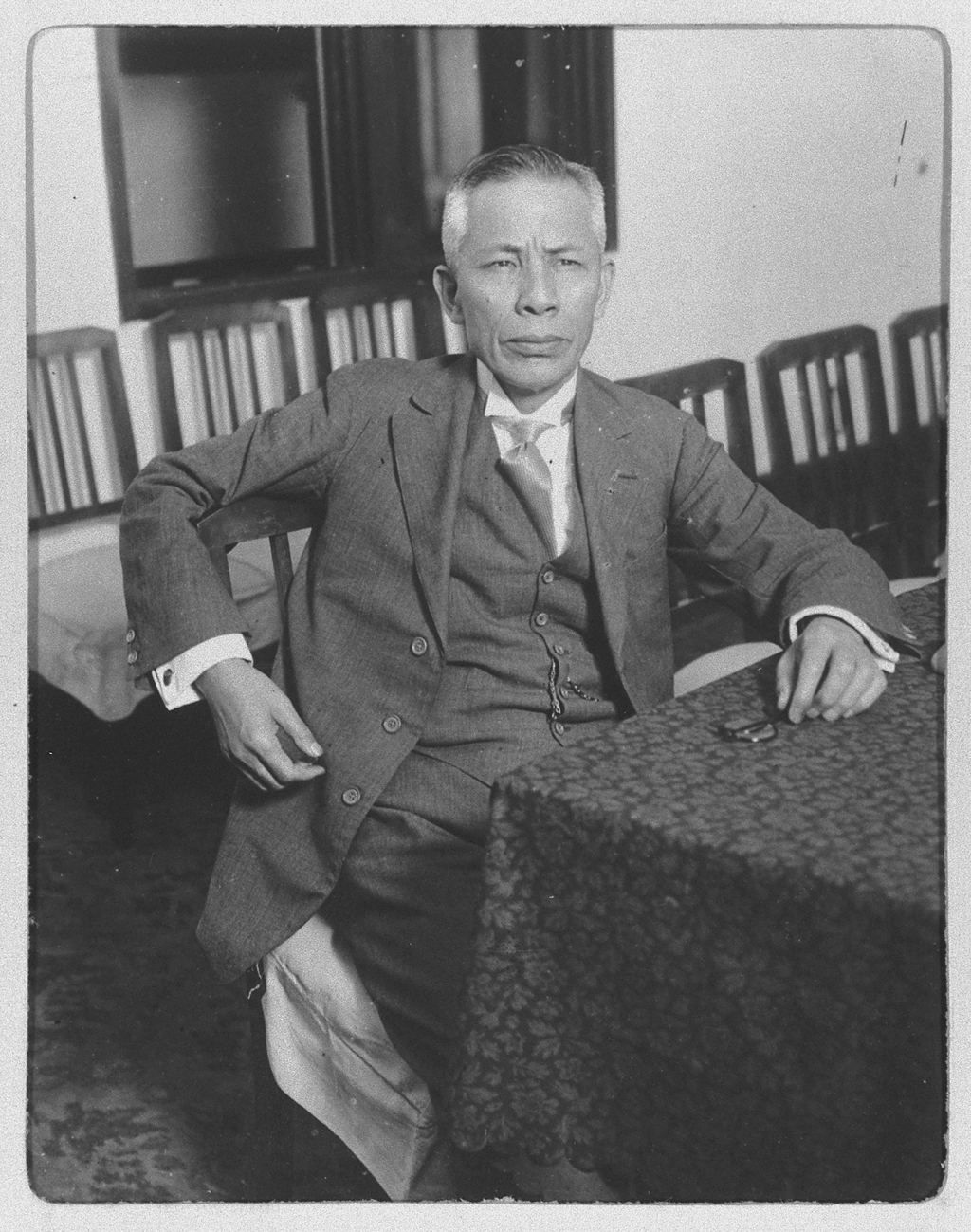
Adachi Kenzō in 1926

The sōshi became fixated on the politically active Korean queen. According to historian Danny Orbach, a mix of sexism, racism, and political agendas led to members of the Kanjō shinpō taking the lead in plotting her assassination. They began to romanticize her killing; in his memoirs, founder of the Kanjō shinpō Adachi Kenzō described the queen as "that bewitching beauty, who cunningly, ubiquitously, and treacherously manipulated virtuous men for over a generation". They romanticized the male Daewongun as "the old hero", and juxtaposed him to the image of an evil feminine queen. Adachi and others at the Kanjō shinpō referred to her in writings as a "fox" or "vixen", and began frequently commenting to each other that she should be killed, which they described as hōru (屠る; lit. 'to slaughter an animal'). Calls for her killing reportedly increased over time.

=== Miura Gorō ===
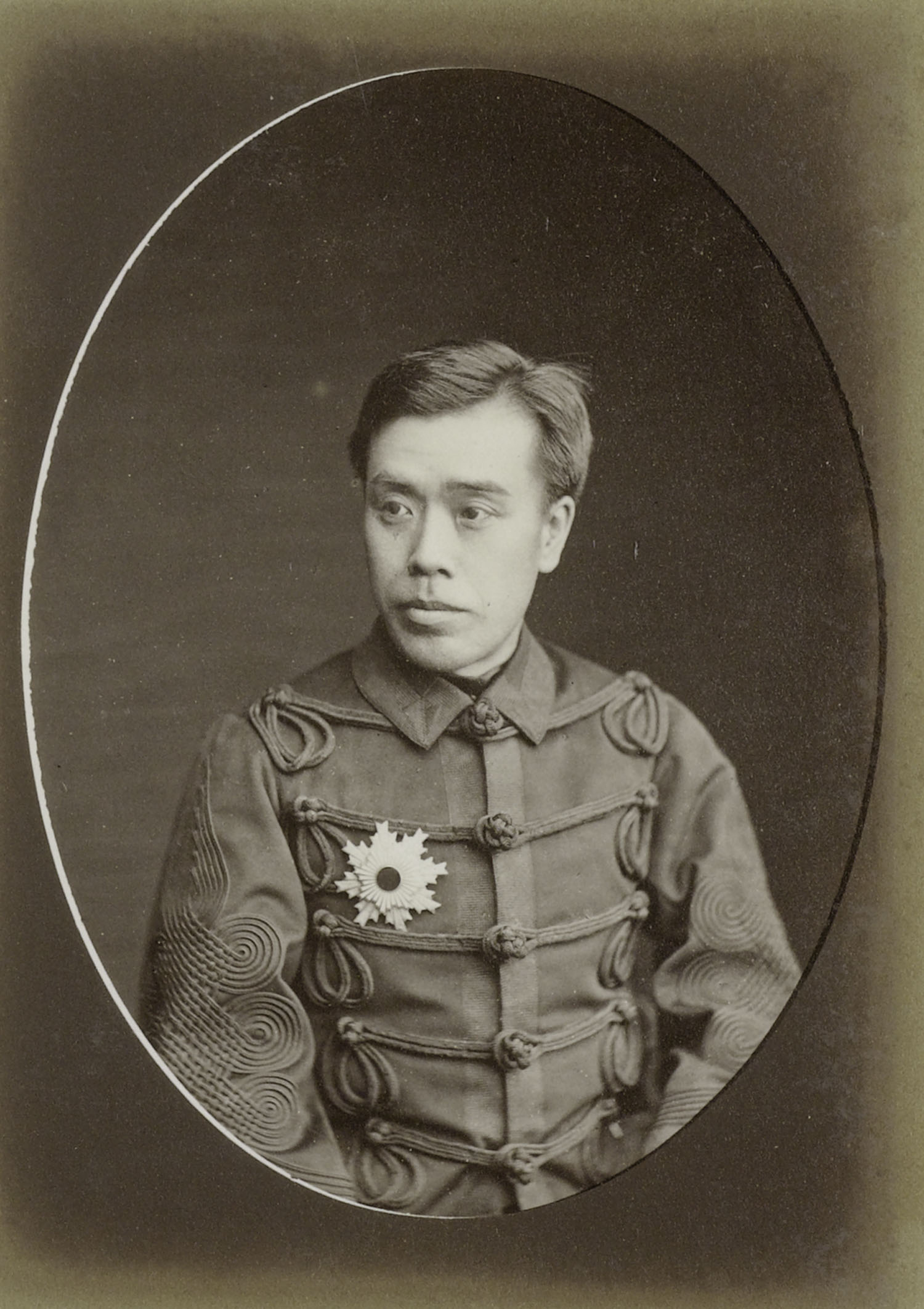
Miura Gorō in the 1880s

In summer of 1895, the Japanese government replaced its envoy in Korea Inoue Kaoru with Miura Gorō. Miura had previously been a soldier and military commander, and he privately professed to loathing politics and politicians.

A number of scholars have argued that the reason for Miura's appointment is uncertain. He professed to having little interest or experience in diplomacy, and the post was difficult and important to Japan. He refused the post thrice, and by his own admission thought it complicated and confusing. He felt as though he was being pushed to Korea, and reluctantly accepted the position. When he arrived there, he wrote that he found the queen to be intelligent and condescending to him. Orbach wrote that Miura "felt clueless and helpless" in dealing with her, and that Japan was in fact in a position of weakness in Korea due to Miura's poor performance in his role. Scholars have reasoned that, as a soldier, Miura was aggressive by nature, and therefore chose to act violently.

According to Orbach's analysis, Miura privately despised his superiors, and acted despite their wishes. Miura later wrote of his role in the plot:

This was a matter I decided in the space of three puffs on a cigarette... I made my decision and resolutely carried it through. I was surprisingly unconcerned about the government at home... Whether my behavior was right or wrong, only Heaven can judge.

=== Japanese government involvement in the assassination ===
There is disagreement as to whether the mainstream Japanese government had any role in planning the assassination.

The South Korean Encyclopedia of Korean Culture, which has been described as one of the most frequently used encyclopedias for Korean studies, has an article on this incident that claims that denial of the Japanese government's involvement mainly comes from historians of Japan. It further argues that the Japanese government had the incentive to kill the queen, as she was significantly damaging Japan's position in Korea. It points out the odd choice of the inexperienced and militant Miura as the new emissary, and notes that Miura visited Japan for some reason on 21 September, several weeks before the assassination. Miura's visit reportedly led to rumors in Seoul that the queen would be assassinated. Also, the article argues that the broad involvement of the Japanese consular police and military in the plot makes the isolation of the plot implausible.

According to Orbach, a historian of Japan and other places, Inoue and his superiors in Japan were hesitant about assassinating the queen. Orbach provided the reasoning that Inoue had previously offered the queen Japan's protection if she ever felt that she was in danger. British explorer Isabella Bird, who was in Korea around this time, wrote of this assurance:

The Korean sovereigns would naturally think themselves justified in relying on the promise so frankly given by one of the most distinguished of Japanese statesmen... and it is clear to myself that when the fateful night came, a month later, their reliance on this assurance led them to omit certain possible precautions, and caused the Queen to neglect to make her escape at the first hint of danger.

=== Creating the plan ===
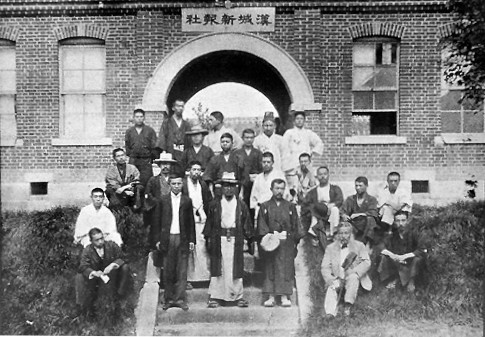
Kanjō shinpō staff in front of their headquarters (1895)

Around 19 September 1895, Miura met with Adachi. According to Adachi's testimony, Miura euphemistically asked Adachi if he knew of any young men available for a "fox hunt" (狐狩り), and Adachi enthusiastically agreed. He wrote that "his heart leaped with joy" when Miura shared his plan. Adachi cautioned that the Kanjō shinpō staff were gentle by nature, and that he wanted to recruit others for the plot. Miura rejected this, and asked that Adachi use all of his employees in the interest of secrecy. Adachi recruited all of the Kanjō shinpō staff for the task, and a group of other sōshi.

The men were reportedly greatly excited about the coming attack. Journalist Kobayakawa Hideo reportedly almost burst into tears when he was initially told to stay behind, and later claimed that he felt like he was among "heroes of a novel" during the assassination. Hirayama Iwahiko reportedly told Adachi's wife that she "must be sorry [she was] born a woman", because she could not join the assassins.

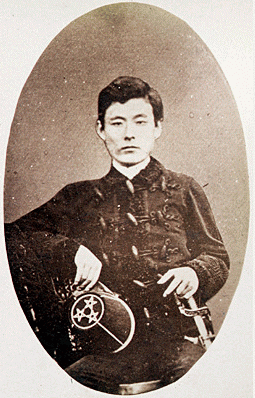
Okamoto Ryūnosuke

According to the verdict of the preliminary court in Hiroshima, the plan was formally approved in a meeting at the Japanese Legation on 3 October in a meeting between Miura, Sugimura Fukashi, and Okamoto Ryūnosuke.

=== The Daewongun's role in the plot ===
There is disagreement as to what kind of role the Daewongun had in the plot.

According to historians of Japan Orbach and Donald Keene, on 5 October, Okamoto met with the Daewongun and implied that an uprising was imminent. Okamoto offered the Daewongun a series of conditions in exchange for power. How the Daewongun responded is not known; one man later testified during his trial that the Daewongun happily accepted the conditions. Okamoto testified that the Daewongun initially rejected them, but eventually relented.

The Encyclopedia of Korean Culture does not mention whether this meeting took place, and claims that, overall, the Daewongun did not participate in this plot willingly.

=== Accelerating the timeline ===
They originally planned to execute the murder in mid-October, but officers of the Hullyŏndae, especially the Korean commander of the Second Battalion U Pŏmsŏn, warned the plotters that the queen was about to take action against them. On the 7th, the Korean war minister advised Miura that the court had ordered the disbandment of the Hullyŏndae. As the war minister had no authority to disband it, he asked Miura to do it. In reply to this request, Miura reportedly angrily yelled, "You fool, never!" and forced him out of the room.

Miura felt that they needed to act quickly, as the Hullyŏndae was critical to their plot. He felt that the queen was going to assassinate pro-Japanese Korean politicians to align Korea with Russia. They decided to kill her on the next day, 8 October.

According to Orbach, Inoue Kaoru reportedly made a final attempt to stop the assassination. Inoue telegraphed Miura and asked him to visit the palace and negotiate a peaceful solution. Sugimura and Miura reportedly gave an evasive reply, writing, "[W]arnings will not be effective. The situation is very dangerous, and it is difficult to know when an incident will occur".

== Assassination ==
=== Convincing the Daewongun ===
According to Orbach and Keene, in the early hours of 8 October, Okamoto, Deputy Consul Horiguchi Kumaichi, Police Inspector Ogiwara Hidejiro (荻原秀次郎), and an armed group of men in civilian clothing went to the Daewongun's residence at Gongdeok-ri. (Note: Now in Yeomni-dong, Mapo District, Seoul; the building has since been relocated to the temple Bongwonsa.) They arrived around 2 am, and the leaders went inside to speak with the Daewongun. The negotiations took several hours, and the Japanese negotiators grew impatient. They potentially employed force in getting the Daewongun to agree or move quicker. They boarded him onto a litter, and began carrying him to the palace. On the way, the Daewongun stopped the men and asked to receive their word that the king and crown prince would not be harmed. They were joined by around sixty men on the way. Among those men were around thirty sōshi, Korean civilians, Hullyŏndae, Japanese army officers, and consular policemen. (Note: They were dressed in an irregular assortment of Korean, Japanese, and Western clothing, and carried a mix of swords, sticks, and pistols.)

The Encyclopedia of Korean Culture writes that the Daewongun and his son were kidnapped (납치) at this meeting and taken to the palace.

=== Securing the palace ===
According to Orbach, Korean collaborators neutralized the palace guards (siwidae). Soldiers were quietly reassigned from their posts or convinced to allow the plot. No guards were stationed on the path to the queen.

Around 5 am, as the sun was beginning to break, some of the Japanese policemen climbed the walls of the palace using folding ladders and opened the gates from the inside. The northwest gate (추성문; Ch'usŏngmun) and northeast gate (춘생문; Ch'unsaengmun) were opened first, then the main south Gwanghwamun and north gate Sinmumun followed.

According to the Encyclopedia of Korean Culture, around 300 to 400 guards were stationed at the palace. Limited gun fights occurred, and the palace guard abandoned their posts for their own safety. A Korean Hullyŏndae commander loyal to the queen, Hong Kyehun, confronted the attackers. He was shot to death by a Japanese officer. According to sōshi Kobayakawa, the road became littered with abandoned caps, weapons, and uniforms. The American military advisor to Korea William McDye attempted to rally several dozen troops to fight, but they disobeyed.

Around 5 am, the collaborating Korean Vice Minister of Agriculture advised the queen to stay put for her own safety, and that the Japanese would not harm her. Gojong awoke and became alarmed by the noise outside. He dispatched a confidant to alert the American and Russian envoys. The assassins surrounded the inner chamber of the palace and blocked all exits.

=== Searching for the queen ===
According to historian of Korea Sheila Miyoshi Jager, neither Miura nor any of the agents knew what the queen looked like, as they had never seen her before. Jager wrote that Miura testified that a screen had always been erected between the queen and outside visitors. They had heard the queen had a bald spot above her temple. According to the Encyclopedia of Korean Culture, British diplomat Walter Hillier testified that the assassins had a photo of the queen.

The assassins needed to search for and deduce who the queen was. According to sōshi Takahashi Genji, the two main sōshi factions there, the Freedom Party and Kumamoto Party, had a bet running on who could find the queen first. Orbach reasoned that this probably contributed to the eventual brutality of her killing.

The assassins began frantically searching for the queen, beating the people in the palace for information, and dragging everyone outside of the inner hall. Women were beaten and dragged by the hair and thrown out of windows and off verandas, with some falling around two meters (around 7 feet) onto the ground. Russian advisor Afanasy Seredin-Sabatin feared for his life, and asked to be spared by the Japanese. He witnessed Korean women being dragged by the hair and into the mud. According to the official Korean investigation report:

The Japanese sōshi, numbering thirty or more, under the leadership of a head Japanese, rushed with drawn swords into the building, searching the private rooms, seizing all the palace women they could catch, dragging them round by the hair and beating them and demanding to know where the queen was.

Two court ladies were suspected of being the queen; they were both slashed to death. The Minister of the Royal Household Yi Kyŏngjik (이경직; 李耕稙) moved to block the ladies' quarters, where the queen was. His hands were sliced off, and he bled to death. The crown princess was thrown down the stairs, and the crown prince was similarly threatened.

=== Killing of the queen ===
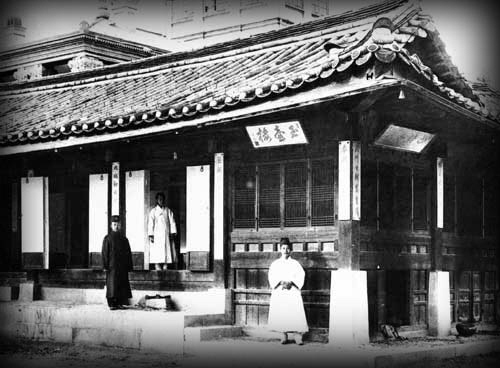
The location of the assassination: Okhoru (옥호루; 玉壺樓), Geoncheonggung, Gyeongbokgung. (photo taken early 1900s)

It is not known who killed the queen. Several people boasted of the achievement, with Keene evaluating some testimonies as unconvincing. It was possibly sōshi Takahashi Genji (alias Terasaki Yasukichi) or a Japanese army lieutenant.

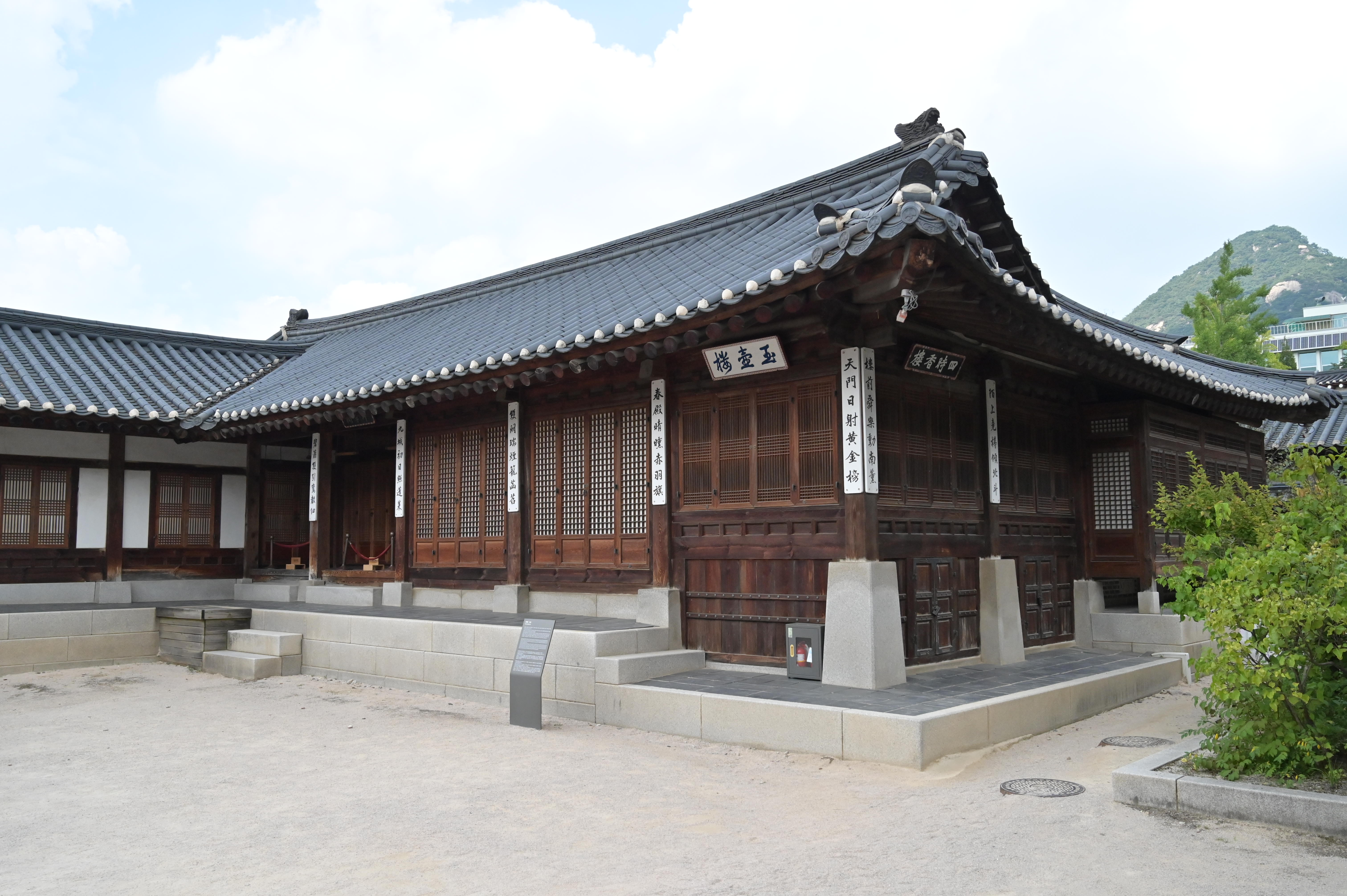
Gonnyeonghap (Former Okhoru)

Takahashi later testified:

We went on inside. When we got into [the queen's] room there were some 20 or 30 court ladies in there. We flung them off one at a time. Then, when we looked under the bedding, there was someone dressed exactly the same as the other court ladies, but quite self-possessed, not making a fuss, looking like somebody important, and this told us it was [the queen]. Grabbing her by the hair, we dragged her from her hiding place. Just what you'd expect, she wasn't in the least bit ruffled... I swung my sword down on her head. Nakamura was holding her by the hair, so his hand got slightly cut. I let her have it from the head, so one blow was enough to finish her. The others criticized me saying I was too reckless, killing her before we had identified that it was [the queen], but later on it turned out it really was.

According to the testimony of the Korean crown prince, the killer threw her to the floor, jumped on her chest three times, and slashed her with his sword.

It was not yet clear to them that they had killed the queen, so they brought a number of women over to examine the body. The women mourned and collapsed in anguish at the sight of her, which the assassins took as confirmation. They then took the body of the queen into a nearby forest, poured gasoline over her, and set her on fire.

== Immediate aftermath ==
The agents looted the palace and left through the palace's main gate Gwanghwamun. They left the palace gradually, and were witnessed by foreign envoys leaving even by 7 am.

People came to investigate the commotion. Editors of the journal The Korean Repository wrote that they saw that Gyeongbokgung's front gate was being guarded by Japanese troops, and that a surging crowd of Koreans was inside, with palace women notably among them. An American envoy and Russian colleague wrote of "Japanese with disordered clothes, long swords and sword canes" hurrying around.

Around 6 am, Miura and the Daewongun then went to the palace. According to Miura, the Daewongun was "beaming with delight". The two went to a separate building to have an audience with Gojong, who was deeply shaken by the attack. The Daewongun gave Gojong a number of documents to sign. In one, he vowed to aid Gojong in expelling "low fellows", saving the country, and establishing peace. A proclamation read:

It is now thirty-two years since We [sic] ascended the throne but Our rule has not extended wide. Queen Min introduced her relatives to the Court and place them around Our person, whereby she made dull Our senses, exposed the people to extortion, put Our government in disorder, selling offices and titles. Hence tyranny prevailed all over the country and robbers arose in all quarters. Under these circumstances, the foundation of Our dynasty was in imminent peril. We knew the extreme of her wickedness, but could not dismiss and punish her because of helplessness and fear of her party... We have endeavored to discover her whereabouts, but as she does not come forth and appear. We are convinced that she is not only unfit and unworthy of the Queen's rank but also that her guilt is excessive and brimful... So We hereby depose her from the rank of Queen and reduce her to the level of the lowest class.

Gojong reportedly responded to the Daewongun with "you can cut my fingers off, but I will not sign your proclamation". The Daewongun was forced to issue the edict without the royal seal, and published it in the Official Gazette. He received only one endorsement from a minister of his new pro-Japanese cabinet. It was widely rejected by foreign diplomats in Seoul.

In the immediate aftermath, fearing for his life under Japanese surveillance, King Gojong requested Russian protection. On November 19, 1895, Gojong sent a personal letter to Russian Minister Karl Weber requesting guards at the palace, following Weber's earlier threat to Japanese envoy Komura on October 25. This request foreshadowed Agwanpacheon in February 1896.

=== Distrust in the palace ===
The Daewongun and new cabinet pushed for influence in the palace. King Gojong asked foreigners to stay with him, to serve as witnesses to deter further Japanese attacks. The foreigners prevented both Korean and Japanese people from seeing the king or crown prince out of caution.

A loyalist group made an attempt to extract Gojong from the palace. However, one of the plotters who was to open the gate informed the Daewongun of the plot. (Note: That same day, American Horace Grant Underwood visited the king, and was suspected of being among the loyalist group, although he reportedly had no prior knowledge of it. These accusations against Underwood were repeated in Japanese newspapers.)

Gojong initially suspected the attack to not be of Miura's doing, but to be the initiative of Okamoto and his pro-Japanese advisors: Kim Hong-jip, Yu Kil-chun, Cho Ŭiyŏn, and Chŏng Pyŏngha (정병하; 鄭秉夏).

== Miura's response ==
Numerous witnesses had seen the movement and identity of the attackers, which Orbach argues made a trail back to Miura. Korean royal emissaries rushed over to the Japanese legation to summon Miura. They found Miura and Sugimura already dressed and prepared to go, with a litter prepared for the walk.

=== Responding to foreign witnesses ===
In the afternoon on the 8th, Miura was confronted with accusations from other envoys, especially those of Russia and America. Miura claimed that it was not known what had happened to the queen and that she had possibly escaped, and placed the blame of the incident on the Daewongun and the Hullyŏndae. The Russian envoy, Karl Ivanovich Weber, insisted that Japanese swords had been seen at the crime scene. Miura responded by claiming they were probably the swords of Koreans pretending to be Japanese. On the morning of the 9th, Miura arranged for the new pro-Japanese war minister to claim that Korean rebels had dressed up in Japanese clothes. For this, three Korean scapegoats were executed.

News of the assassination spread slowly. Witnesses McDye and Sabatin shared what they had seen with the foreigner community in Seoul. American journalist John Albert Cockerill, who wrote for the New York Herald and happened to be in Seoul at the time, attempted to telegraph news of the killing. However, Miura pressured the telegraph office into not sending the message. On the 14th, the United States finally learned of what had happened. When it asked the Japanese legation to confirm, the legation responded that the attack was purely led by the Daewongun and Hullyŏndae, and that it was not known if the queen had been killed.

Miura was widely disbelieved. A few days afterwards, the Russian and American legations sent marines to protect the king.

=== Japanese investigation ===
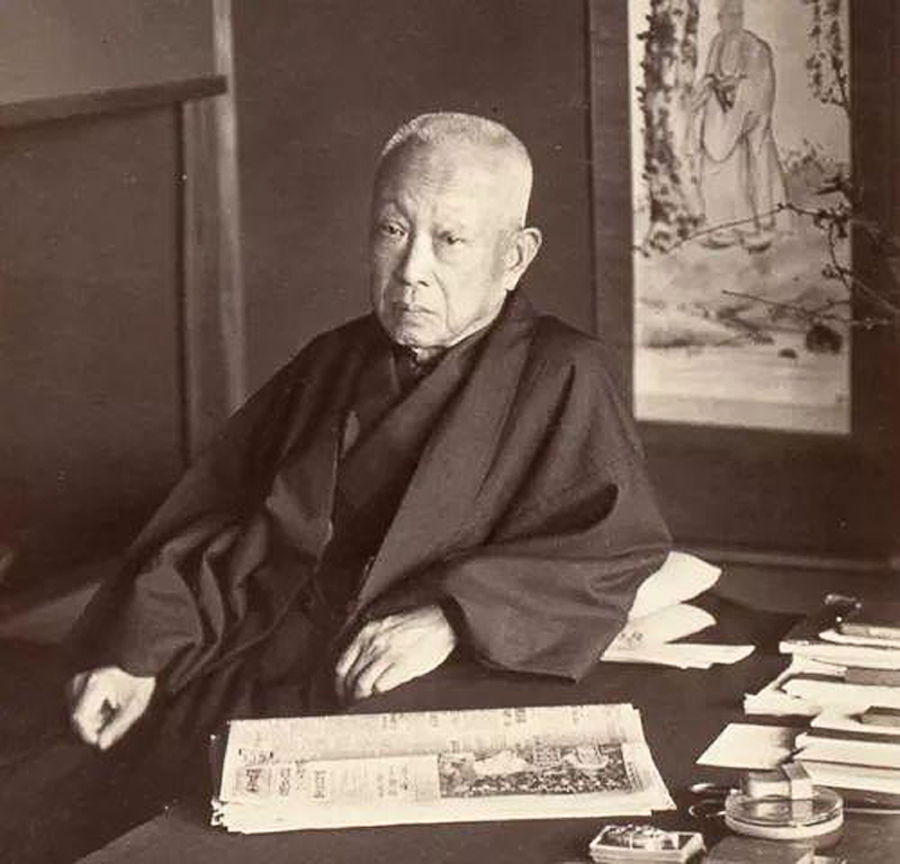
Saionji Kinmochi

At 8 a.m. on the 9th, Miura telegraphed Japanese acting foreign minister Saionji Kinmochi with the assurance that the commotion was merely infighting between Korean troops. He told Saionji that it was unknown if the queen was still alive. Saionji asked Miura if any Japanese people had been involved. Miura replied that the queen "might have been" killed, but that Japanese involvement was still uncertain. That evening, he told Saionji that "some Japanese" may have been involved in the incident, but "did not do violence". Miura placed the blame of the incident on the queen, and reportedly hinted that she needed to have been prevented from disbanding the Hullyŏndae and decreasing Japanese influence in Korea.

Fearing a confrontation between the foreign marines and the Japanese forces, Saionji ordered Miura to restrain the sōshi and to keep the Japanese soldiers in their barracks. The home minister also requested that Prime Minister Itō Hirobumi issue an edict banning additional sōshi from traveling to Korea.

Japanese Consul Uchida Sadatsuchi, supreme Japanese judicial authority in Seoul, was reportedly enraged by Miura's conduct. He wrote that Miura had treated everyone but the plotters, including others in the Japanese government, as outsiders. Uchida initially considered whitewashing the whole affair, especially as he was still unsure as to whether Japanese people had been involved, but ultimately began his own investigation. Diplomat Komura Jūtarō was dispatched from Tokyo to investigate the murder. The two concluded that Miura and the others had actually orchestrated the murder, and submitted a candid report to Tokyo on 15 November, with a recommendation that the plotters be punished. Uchida also expelled some of the sōshi from Korea, which caused him to receive violent threats from parts of the Japanese settler community.

== Japanese trial and acquittal ==
On 17 or 18 October, the Japanese recalled Miura, Sugimura, Okamoto, and the sōshi to Japan for trial. After partaking in farewell banquets where they were hailed as national heroes by the Japanese settlers, they boarded a ship to Hiroshima, with some of them reportedly hopeful that they would again be welcomed as heroes. Upon their arrival, they were arrested on charges of murder and conspiracy to commit murder.

=== Civilian trial ===
According to Orbach, the trial report is "surprisingly honest" up until the Japanese entry to the palace. It portrayed Miura as having a clear intention to kill the queen. However, the record abruptly ends there.

On 20 January 1896, the defendants were acquitted of all charges on the grounds of insufficient evidence. This included the charge of conspiracy to commit murder. The verdict cited Article 165 of the Meiji Code of Criminal Procedure (刑事訴訟法), which gave judges the authority to acquit if they believed evidence was insufficient. Evidence gathered for the trial was also returned to all original owners.

According to Danny Orbach:

[T]he court's arguments seem to defy reason. The facts mentioned at the verdict certainly supported the conspiracy indictment, and as for the act of homicide itself, there was solid evidence against at least four of the sōshi and two of the policemen. Consul Uchida, eager to incriminate the defendants, had sent ample additional evidence to the court. Furthermore, Judge Yoshioka did not invite key foreign witnesses, nor even consider their written testimony, meticulously taken by Uchida. Therefore, the fact that Yoshioka acquitted all defendants of all charges cannot be explained exclusively through recourse to the legal realm.

The general consensus among recent historians is that the Japanese government likely intervened in the trial. In 2005, a professor at Seoul National University discovered a document that reportedly confirmed that Emperor Meiji had received Uchida's report on the assassination around nine days before the trial. Orbach expresses skepticism of this intervention, and argued that there is no direct written proof of the intervention of the emperor or the government, and that if the government intervened it was likely in great secrecy. Orbach also notes that the acquittal was possibly the sole decision of Judge Yoshioka Yoshihide (吉岡美秀).

=== Military trial ===
Shortly before the civilians were acquitted, the military tribunal of the Hiroshima Fifth Division acquitted all the military personnel involved in the assassination. According to Orbach, the tribunal initially seemed to believe in their innocence, but gradually began to notice significant contradictions in the testimonies. The tribunal asked for the army ministry to send investigators to interrogate military personnel stationed in Korea. However, ultimately the investigators expressed sympathy for what would happen to the defendants and their families if the defendants were to be found guilty. The tribunal reasoned that they were just following orders, and that Japanese martial law was unclear as to whether subordinates had the right to disobey unjust orders.

After a final consultation with the Japanese government's Army Ministry, the tribunal decided to acquit the defendants. The tribunal ruled that the defendants did not know there was a plot to kill the queen, and that they were only guarding the gates and helping the Daewongun enter the palace.

=== Fates of the assassins ===
Most of the assassins returned to Korea and resumed their careers, where they became key voices of the Japanese community there. Adachi remained as president of the Kanjō shinpō and stayed in Japan to enter parliamentary politics. He eventually became Minister of Communications.

== Impact ==
=== Increased Russian influence in Korea ===
On 11 February 1896, Gojong and the crown prince fled to the Russian legation for safety. Gojong ordered the executions of four of his pro-Japanese cabinet, whom he dubbed the Four Eulmi Traitors. This ended the Kabo Reform. Gojong disbanded the Hullyŏndae for participating in the assassination and Capital Guards for failing to stop the Japanese. Until Japan's victory in the Russo-Japanese War, Japan's position in Korea was significantly weakened by the assassination.

=== International response ===
Japan initially received some international backlash for the murder. However, the backlash was short-lived, with foreign governments determining that forwarding their foreign policy interests in Asia was more important than escalating the issue with the Japanese.

=== Anti-Japanese sentiment in Korea ===
The Korean public was outraged when they learned of the assassination. The pro-Japanese Prime Minister Kim Hong-jip was confronted by a mob and lynched. Several months later, Kim Ku, who later served as the president of the Provisional Government of the Republic of Korea, assassinated a Japanese man as revenge for the queen's murder. In 1909, An Jung-geun infamously assassinated Itō Hirobumi, and gave this incident as one of his reasons for doing so. This incident, as well as the Short Hair Ordinance, ultimately lead to the rise of various civilian anti-Japanese and anti-government militias called righteous armies.

== Analysis ==
Historian of Japan Peter Duus has called this assassination a "hideous event, crudely conceived and brutally executed".

Advisor to Gojong Homer B. Hulbert wrote of the assassination in 1905. He believed that the mainstream Japanese government was not involved in plotting the assassination. He theorised that the government of Japan were possibly only to blame for having appointed a man of Count Miura's temperament as their representative in Joseon. The arrest of Miura and his Japanese conspirators was sufficient in itself to destabilise their Korean followers' positions.

== Seredin-Sabatin's account ==
In 2005, professor Kim Rekho (김려춘; 金麗春) of the Russian Academy of Sciences came across a written account of the incident by a Russian architect Afanasy Seredin-Sabatin in the Archive of Foreign Policy of the Russian Empire. The document was released to the public on 11 May 2005.

Almost five years before the document's release in South Korea, a translated copy was in circulation in the United States, having been released by the Center for Korean Research of Columbia University on 6 October 1995 to commemorate the 100th anniversary of the Eulmi Incident.

In the account, Seredin-Sabatin recorded:

The courtyard where the Queen (Consort)'s wing was located was filled with Japanese, perhaps as many as 20 or 25 men. They were dressed in peculiar gowns and were armed with sabres, some of which were openly visible. ... While some Japanese troops were rummaging around in every corner of the palace and in the various annexes, others burst into the queen's wing and threw themselves upon the women they found there. ... I ... continued to observe the Japanese turning things inside out in the queen's wing. Two Japanese grabbed one of the court ladies, pulled her out of the house, and ran down the stairs dragging her along behind them. ... Moreover one of the Japanese repeatedly asked me in English, "Where is the queen? Point the queen out to us!" ... While passing by the main Throne Hall, I noticed that it was surrounded shoulder to shoulder by a wall of Japanese soldiers and officers, and Korean mandarins, but what was happening there was unknown to me.

== Apology ==
In May 2005, 84-year-old Tatsumi Kawano (川野 龍巳), the grandson of Kunitomo Shigeaki, paid his respects to Empress Myeongseong at her tomb in Namyangju, Gyeonggi, South Korea. He apologized to Empress Myeongseong's tomb on behalf of his grandfather. However, the apology was not well received as the descendants of Empress Myeongseong argued that the apology had to be made on a governmental level.

Since 2009, several South Korean non-governmental organizations have been attempting to sue the Japanese government for its complicity in the murder of Queen Min. "Japan has not made an official apology or repentance 100 years after it obliterated the Korean people for 35 years through the 1910 Korea-Japan Annexation Treaty," the suit alleged. The lawsuit was to be filed if the Japanese government did not accept their demand to issue a special statement on 15 August offering the emperor's apology and promising to release relevant documents on the murder case.

== Perpetrators ==
=== Groups ===
- Japanese Legation Security Group (公使館守備隊), a joint military unit (Imperial Japanese Army and Imperial Japanese Navy) who provided security for the Japanese legation. It was commanded by legation minister Miura Gorō.
- Japanese Legation Security Police Officers, commanded by legation minister Miura Gorō and led by MOFA Police Chief Inspector (外務省警部) Hagiwara Hidejiro (萩原秀次郎) at the scene. The Japanese Legation Security Police Officers wore plain clothes during the Eulmi Incident.
- Three battalions of the Hullyŏndae, commanded by Major U Pŏmsŏn (1st battalion), Major Yi Tuhwang (2nd battalion), and Major Yi Chinho (3rd battalion). Hullyŏndae commander Lieutenant Colonel Hong Kyehun did not notice the betrayal by his officers and was killed in action by his own men.
- At least four Imperial Japanese Army Keijō garrison (京城守備隊) officers who served as military advisors and instructors of the Hullyŏndae, including Second Lieutenant Miyamoto Taketaro (宮本竹太郞). The IJA Keijō Garrison was commanded by the Imperial Japanese Army General Staff Office, but Second Lieutenant Miyamoto's crew joined in the Eulmi Incident without permission from the IJA General Staff Office.
- More than four dozen continental ronin disguised as Japanese officials, including Adachi Kenzō. They took the role of a vanguard. According to a secret report by Ishizuka Eizo, most of them originally came from Kumamoto Prefecture and were armed with katanas and handguns. (On 3 December 1965, Japanese politician Kuroyanagi Akira (黒柳明) mentioned part of Ishizuka Eizo's secret report in the Special Committee on Japan-Korea Treaty (日韓条約等特別委員会), House of Councillors).

=== Individuals ===
In Japan, 56 men were charged. All were acquitted by the Hiroshima court due to a lack of evidence. The factual findings of the Hiroshima investigating court were translated into English and printed, and were cited in scholarly works by 1905.

They included (among others):

- Viscount Miura Gorō, Japanese legation minister.
- Adachi Kenzō, former samurai and head of the Kanjō Shinpō
- Okamoto Ryūnosuke, a legation official and former Japanese Army officer
- Hozumi Torakurō, businessman
- Kokubun Shōtarō, Japanese legation officials
- Chief Inspector Hagiwara Hidejiro, Officer Watanabe Takajiro (渡辺 鷹次郎), Officer Oda Toshimitsu (小田俊光), Officer Naruse Kishiro (成瀬 喜四郎), Officer Yokoo Yujiro (横尾 勇次郎), Officer Sakai Masutaro (境 益太郎), Officer Shiraishi Yoshitaro (白石 由太郎), Officer Kinowaki Yoshinori (木脇祐則), Japanese legation officials (Japanese Legation Security Police)
- Sugimura Fukashi, a second Secretary of the Japanese legation, Legation minister Miura's inner circle. In his autobiography "Meiji 17~18 Year, The Record of the torment in Korea (明治廿七八年在韓苦心録)", he unilaterally claims that the Eulmi Incident was his own scheme, not Miura's.
- Lieutenant Colonel Kusunose Yukihiko, an artillery officer in the Imperial Japanese Army and Military Attaché at the Japanese legation in Korea, Legation minister Miura's inner circle.
- Kunitomo Shigeaki, one of the original Seikyōsha ("Society for Political Education") members
- Shiba Shirō (柴四朗), former samurai, private secretary to the Minister of Agriculture and Commerce of Japan, and writer who studied political economy at the Wharton School and Harvard University. He had a close connection with Japanese legation minister Miura Gorō because Shiba contributed Miura becoming a resident legation minister in Korea.
- Sase Kumatetsu, a physician
- Terasaki Yasukichi (寺崎泰吉), a medicine peddler
- Nakamura Tateo (中村楯雄)
- Horiguchi Kumaichi; in 2021, a letter was found which was sent by him to his friend which writes about how the assassination happened and how easy it was.
- Ieiri Kakitsu (家入嘉吉)
- Kikuchi Kenjō (菊池 謙讓)
- Hirayama Iwahiko
- Ogihara Hidejiro (荻原秀次郎)
- Kobayakawa Hideo (小早川秀雄), editor in chief of Kanjō shinpō
- Sasaki Masayuki
- Isujuka Eijoh

In Korea, King Gojong declared that the following were the 'Eulmi Four Traitors (을미사적; 乙未四賊; Eulmisajeok)' on 11 February 1896:

- Cho Hŭiyŏn
- Yu Kil-chun
- Kim Hong-jip
- Chŏng Pyŏngha

New pieces of information appeared in 2021 in the form of private letters written by a Japanese consular officer to his best friend in Japan. Eight letters (apparently traded for the stamps on the envelopes) were sent by Kumaichi Horiguchi to Teisho Takeishi detailing Horiguchi's part in the slaying.

== See also ==
- Japanese occupation of Gyeongbokgung
- Death of Gojong of Korea: Theories that Gojong was poisoned by Japanese agents in 1919.
