= Miura Gorō =

Japanese samurai and general (1847–1926)

Lieutenant General Viscount Miura Gorō
- 三浦 梧楼
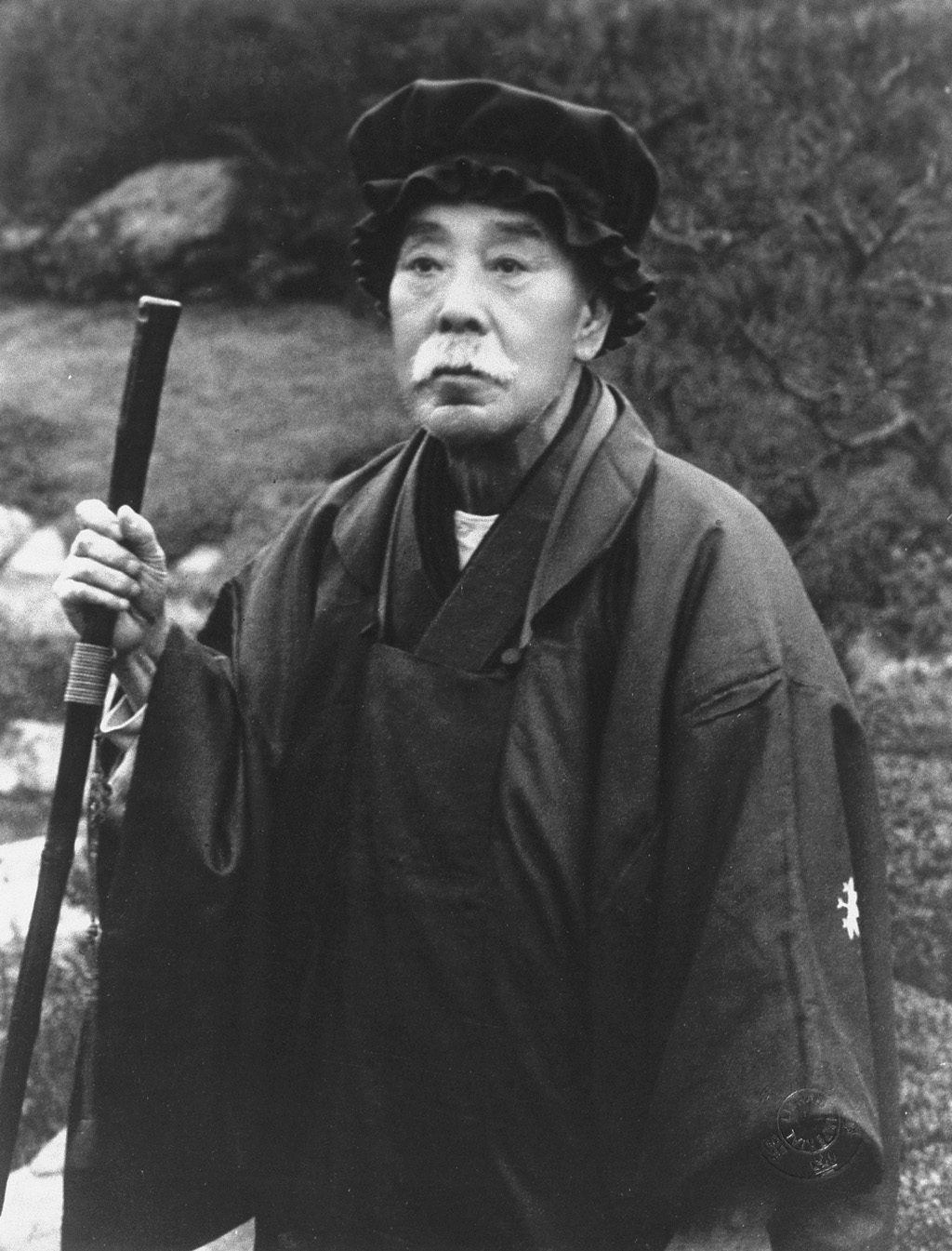
- Born: 1 January 1847; Hagi, Nagato, Japan
- Died: 28 January 1926 (aged 79); Koishikawa, Tokyo, Japan
- Education: Meirinkan
- Military career
- Allegiance: Empire of Japan
- Branch: Imperial Japanese Army
- Rank: Lieutenant general
- Units: Kiheitai; Ministry of the Army
- Commands: Imperial Japanese Army Academy
- Conflicts: Boshin War; Battle of Hokuetsu; Hagi Rebellion; Satsuma Rebellion; Battle of Tabaruzaka; Murder of Queen Min

Member of the Privy Council
- In office 14 October 1910 – 22 January 1924
- Monarchs: Meiji; Taishō

Member of the House of Peers
- In office 10 July 1890 – 30 September 1891 Elected by the Viscounts

Viscount Miura Gorō (三浦 梧楼; 1 January 1847 – 28 January 1926) was a prominent samurai, and a lieutenant general in the early Imperial Japanese Army; he is notable for orchestrating the murder of Queen Min of Korea in 1895.

== Biography ==
Miura was born in Hagi in Chōshū Domain (modern Yamaguchi Prefecture), to a samurai family with the name of Andō, but was adopted by the Miura that was the family name of his father-in-law. After studying at the Meirinkan clan military academy, he entered the Kiheitai irregular militia of the Chōshū domain and played an active role in the Boshin War to overthrow the Tokugawa shogunate. He fought at the Battle of Hokuetsu.

He later held various posts in Army-Navy Ministry under the Meiji government and was commander of the Hiroshima District. He helped suppress the Hagi Rebellion in his native Chōshū. During the Satsuma Rebellion, he served as commander of the Army's Third Brigade during the Battle of Tabaruzaka.

In 1882, Miura was appointed commander of the Imperial Japanese Army Academy. In 1884, he accompanied Ōyama Iwao on a tour of Europe, to study the military systems in various western countries, and favoured an army organisation modelled after the French, and on his return became commander of the Tokyo Garrison. However, Miura come into increasing conflict with the Army leadership under General Yamagata Aritomo over conscription policies, the need for a large standing army, and the government's fire-sale of the assets of the Hokkaidō Colonization Office, as well as Aritomo's favouritism for an army modelled after that of Prussia.

Yamagata and Prince Arisugawa blocked a move by Emperor Meiji to appoint Miura as Chief of staff of the Ministry of the Army in 1886, and he was transferred from Tokyo to the Kumamoto Garrison. Miura resigned rather than accept the demotion, but remained an outspoken critic of Yamagata and the direction he was taking the Imperial Japanese Army.

He became a leading member of the Getsuyōkai, an army fraternal association which had been established by the largely-French trained first graduating classes of the Army Academy. While the Getsuyōkai's main purpose was to encourage research into the latest military developments, under Miura the association's journal, Getsuyōkai kiji, published scathing critics of Yamataga and other army leaders, and promoted the concept of a small, defensive army. Stung by the unceasing criticism, Yamagata ordered Miura into the secondary reserves and ordered the Getsuyōkai disbanded in 1889.

Miura, who had been elevated to the title shishaku (viscount) under the kazoku peerage system in 1884, was appointed a member of the House of Peers from 1890, and became president of the Gakushuin Peers School from 1892.

In September 1895, Miura was appointed Japan’s resident minister in Korea, succeeding Inoue Kaoru. Miura was increasingly concerned over growing Russian influence over the Korean government, and less than a month after his arrival in Korea, Empress Myeongseong ordered the disbanding of the Japanese-trained Hullyeondae militia. Miura saw this as a first step in an attempt to remove pro-Japanese members of the government and loyalists to the Heungseon Daewongun, which would then lead to Russian intervention.

Miura then staged a counter-coup, assassinating the Empress; however, this plan backfired due to international outrage over the incident, widespread anti-Japanese violence throughout Korea, the arrest of pro-Japanese government officials and King Gojong seeking shelter in the Russian consulate. Miura initially denied any Japanese involvement in the incident, despite eye-witness accounts otherwise, and the Japanese government issued a statement that he had acted independently, without instructions from Tokyo.

Miura was recalled to Japan and placed on trial with the involved military personnel at the Hiroshima District Court. The holding of a trial would have given the impression of the rule of law to observers including Western nations. Miura's attorney argued in defense, that killing is not murder when done to achieve political supremacy with Miura admitting the fact of the assassination. Nonetheless, the court found him not guilty on technical grounds of insufficient evidence, presumably of personal motive. Miura and cohorts emerged from trial as national heroes.

Later, after the Japan–Korea Annexation Treaty in 1910, Miura became a privy council member and focused on eliminating vestiges of the clan-based factionalism from politics, gaining a reputation as an Éminence grise for fixing issues "behind-the-scenes".

On his death of uremia in 1926, he was posthumously awarded the Order of the Rising Sun with Paulownia Flowers.

== Popular culture ==
- Portrayed by Kim Eung-soo in the 2012 film Gabi.

== Awards and decorations ==
- Order of the Rising Sun with Paulownia Flowers (posthumously conferred)
- Order of the Rising Sun, 1st class
- Order of the Sacred Treasure, 1st class
- Order of the Crown of Italy
- Order of St. Anna, 1st class
- Order of the Crown
- Commandeur de la Légion d'Honneur
- Order of Franz Joseph

== See also ==
- List of Ambassadors from Japan to South Korea
- Assassination of Empress Myeongseong
