= Alexey Shpeyer =

Russian diplomat (1854–1916)

Alexey Nikolayevich Shpeyer (Russian: Алексей Николаевич Шпейер; 1854–1916) was a diplomat from the Russian Empire. The Russian government had intended to send him to Korea in 1895 to replace Karl Ivanovich Weber as Russian consul general in Korea, but at the request of King Gojong of Korea's Joseon Dynasty, Weber remained in place, and Shpeyer was sent to Tokyo instead. Shpeyer finally replaced Weber in September 1897.

Preceded by Karl Ivanovich Weber	Russian consul general to Korea; 1897–?	Succeeded by ?
Preceded by Pyotr Mikhailovich Vlasov	Russian ambassador to Persia; 1903–1906	Succeeded by Nicholas Genrikhovich Hartwig
