= Woo Jang-chun =

Zainichi Korean botanist (1898–1959)

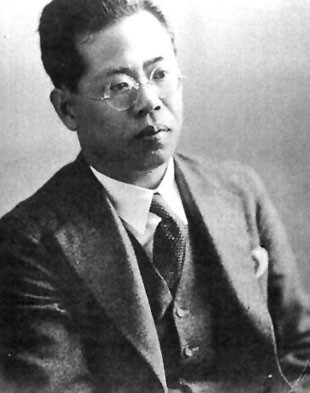

Korean name
- Hangul: 우장춘
- Hanja: 禹長春
Transcriptions
- Revised Romanization: U Jangchun
- McCune–Reischauer: U Changch'un

Japanese name
- Kanji: 禹 長春
Transcriptions
- Romanization: U Nagaharu

Alternative Japanese name
- Kanji: 須永長春
Transcriptions
- Romanization: Sunaga Nagaharu

Woo Jang-chun (April 8, 1898 – August 10, 1959) was an agricultural scientist and botanist active in Japanese Korea and later in South Korea, famous for his discoveries in the genetics and breeding of plants.

Woo was born and raised in Japan, overcoming poverty and discrimination in Imperial Japan to become a prominent researcher and teacher. When Japanese rule over Korea ended in 1945, Woo left his mother, wife, and children in Japan and settled in what would become South Korea to lead the country's efforts in botany and agriculture. There is a memorial museum in the port city of Busan, where he lived and worked in Korea, honoring his life and accomplishments.

Woo is credited in scientific literature as Nagaharu U (/uː/ OO), a Japanese reading of the hanja of his Korean name; the pronunciation of his family name 禹 can be Romanized as U in both Japanese (う) and Korean (우).

== Early life ==
Woo was born on April 8, 1898, in Akasaka, Tokyo and raised in Kure, Hiroshima, he was the first son of a Japanese mother, Naka Sakai (사카이 나카, 酒井ナカ) and a Korean father, Woo Beom-seon (禹範善, 우범선) of the Danyang Woo clan (본관: 단양 우씨, 丹陽 禹氏). Woo Beom-seon served as the commander of the first battalion of the Hullyeondae (a Japanese-trained Korean military force) during the late Joseon period and had sought political asylum in Japan. He was involved in the Gaehwapa movement (a modernization faction) and personally commanded the 2nd Battalion of the Hullyeondae Regiment, which attacked the Palace, and allowed the Japanese ronin to assassinate Empress Myeongseong in the Eulmi Incident, which also led to the murder of two other women on October 13, 1895. Fifty-five Japanese nationals were arrested and tried for involvement but won acquittal in a Japanese court due to lack of evidence. Meanwhile, Queen Min's son, Crown Prince Yi Cheok, accused Woo Beom-seon of complicity in the murders and he fled to Japan.

On November 24, 1903, Woo Beom-seon was assassinated by Go Yeong-geun (高永根, 고영근), leaving five-year-old Woo Jang-choon fatherless. His brother, Woo Hong-chun (禹洪春, 우홍춘) was born in 1904 when Jang-choon was six. Although Woo Jang-choon was part Japanese and held Japanese citizenship, his Japanese mother taught him to honor his Korean heritage. She left Woo in the care of a Buddhist temple orphanage so that she could work and raise funds for his education. Food at the temple was limited to potatoes, and Woo was ostracized by other Japanese children for being part Korean, so he often stayed closed to monks and nuns. His mother returned for him after three years. He was also a practicing Buddhist.

Woo then began his grade school education, working hard to cope with discrimination from peers. Meanwhile, the Empire of Japan had begun to challenge European colonial powers in East Asia, beginning with the Russo-Japanese War (1904–05), which led almost directly to the annexation of Korea in 1910. In Japan, talented male students enlisted in the military, but Woo continued with school. To meet his financial needs, his mother sold all of their possessions, even his father's tomb, though a friend allowed the remains of Woo Beom-seon to be buried in another cemetery.

A talented math student, Woo sought to study engineering at Kyoto Imperial University, but at the suggestion of pro-Japanese Korean statesman Pak Yeong-hyo, he pursued agriculture at Tokyo Imperial University with a scholarship from the Japanese General-Government in Korea. He began his university career at Tokyo Imperial University in 1916, where he was highly regarded by his professors, and graduated in 1919. In 1936, he earned a doctorate in agriculture from the university for his dissertation "Synthesis of Species."

Woo tutored his neighbor's sons, and the neighbor introduced Woo to his sister, Koharu Watanabe (Korean: 와타나베 고하루; Hanja: 渡邊小春). They fell in love but had difficulty convincing Koharu's parents for permission to marry. Against her parents' wishes, however, Koharu and Woo married. Their first child was a daughter, Tomoko Woo. Their marriage produced four daughters and two sons. Kazuo Inamori is his son-in-law through his youngest daughter's marriage.

After Korea was liberated on August 15, 1945, Woo Jang-choon left Japan for Korea but had difficulty fitting in due to his father's actions, which burdened him for life.

== Agricultural achievements in Japan ==
Woo was soon given a position by Japan's Ministry of Agriculture. In order to further his social life, his mother trained him to be tolerant of alcohol, and Woo made many friends. By the age of 23, he had researched morning glory flowers and written a paper on the evolution and relationships between three species of Brassica, introducing the theory known as the Triangle of U, a theory which has since been confirmed by DNA studies.

With Dr. Terao, Woo published two papers on petunia flowers. Then, Dr. Terao assigned Woo to study further on Petunia hybrida Vilm, which, among the different varieties of the species, could not be completely made into double flowers. Half of the flowers would not grow when forced into the double flower phenotype. Further work by Woo brought the complete double flowered Petunia into reality in 1930, and this earned him international prestige in the scientific community.

Woo returned to studying morning glory flowers, but his papers, nearly complete, were burnt in a fire. Then he pursued the study of genotypes and phenotypes. He was assigned to create new crucifers through combination of different phenotypes. His four years of research led to a successful interbreeding of Japanese and Korean crucifers, and another internationally renowned paper. A Doctoral degree was awarded by Tokyo University to Woo as an accolade for his excellence. A significant observation in Dr. Woo's paper was that, evolution does not happen only through the accumulation of beneficial mutations that lead to speciation, but also through exchange of genes between different species.

Many Japanese agricultural study graduates came under Dr. Woo to learn, but were given an overwhelming amount of exacting chores. Yet, they all continued up the ranks; Dr. Woo, however, had to stay in the Japan's Ministry of Agriculture's examination room because the Japanese policy, during the occupation of Korea, was to prevent Koreans from achieving high status. Especially, Dr. Woo had not changed his Korean name to a Japanese one -a policy aimed to assimilate Koreans into the Japanese culture. When he was promoted, it was requested that he change his name; instead, Woo resigned from his position at the Konosu examination room.

He was hired by the Takiyi research farm, where he improved on seed-production methods and agricultural food products through artificial selection. While he concentrated on establishing a solid base for the resources needed for research, he wrote a paper on artificially combining gametophytes to improve the quality of the plants.

Around the end of the World War II, the Takiyi research farm ran a free educational program for students, and Dr. Woo was the lecturer for Korean students; as Japan began to lose the war, Koreans were forcibly drafted into the army.

== Agricultural success in Korea ==
On August 15, 1945, Korea won its independence; Dr. Woo resigned from his positions at the Takiyi research farm and Tokyo University, and prepared his own place near a Buddhist temple. In Korea, farmers were left no seeds to plant because trade between Korea and Japan ceased, and the seeds were produced only in Japan. The policy was aimed to hinder Koreans from obtaining technological knowledge and to profit from selling the seeds to Koreans at a high price. As a result, after the liberation, there were neither people nor companies in Korea which could produce vegetable seeds such as radish and Napa cabbage, and seeds could not be imported from Japan. In accordance to a suggestion by Kim Jong-yi to resolve this problem, President Yi Seung-man sponsored a campaign to urge for Dr. Woo's return; Dr. Woo complied, and a team was established to allow Dr. Woo to work as soon as he returned to Korea. The team worked to gather money and resources, and established the "Hanguk Nong'eop Gwahak Yeonguso" (한국 농업 과학 연구소) or Korean Agricultural Science Research Institute near the city of Busan.

Unfortunately, as a Japanese citizen, Dr. Woo was not allowed to leave Japan for Korea. He therefore collected his papers which had traced his ancestral lineage from Korea, and went to a Japanese office which searched for illegal Korean inhabitants. The employees were shocked that a world-renowned scientist would voluntarily bring himself to the office.

In March 1950, Dr. Woo returned to Korea. The team that was assigned to prepare for Dr. Woo's return welcomed him, holding a sign that read "Welcome! Dr. Woo Jang-choon's return home." A few days later, a welcome ceremony was held in Dongrae Won'e High School, and Dr. Woo delivered a speech: "Unfortunately, I worked for my mother's country, Japan, for fifty years. During those years, I worked for Japan no less than any other Japanese. From now on, I will work for my father's country, my home country, with all of my effort. And I will bury my bones in my home country."

After a trip around the country, Dr. Woo observed the poor conditions of the farms, and concluded that mass production of seeds was imperative. In addition to these desperate circumstances, the Korean War began only three months after Dr. Woo's arrival in Korea. Luckily, the Busan area was able to avoid conflicts, and Dr. Woo could work uninterrupted. Because there were not many insecticides available, Woo concentrated on producing seeds that were less susceptible to bugs. He did not neglect planting flowers, which seemed to not be a concern for a country in destitute conditions. The research institute became filled with countless beautiful flowers, and many visitors came by to enjoy the scenery.

Once, an American colonel made a visit to the institute, and saw a double-flower petunia. He quizzed an employee about the inventor of the flower. When the employee pretended to be ignorant on the subject, the colonel said that it was a Japanese scientist named Dr. Woo. To his surprise, Dr. Woo was a Korean working at the same institute, and the colonel returned with gifts to meet Dr. Woo.

For a country not self-sufficient in producing crops to sustain and feed the country's population, the most crucial requirement was the development of top quality seeds to improve crop production. Woo Jang-choon's work resulted in improved seeds for many of Korea's staple crops, starting with Korean cabbage, the icicle radish, hot peppers, cucumbers, head cabbage, onions, tomatoes, watermelon, the yellow chamui melon. Other major horticultural breakthroughs from Woo's research included germ-resistant seed potatoes, the seedless watermelon, and the Jeju variety of tangerine (제주감귤).

Later, the Korean Agricultural Science Research Institute was renamed Central Agricultural Technology Research Institute (중앙 원예 기술원).

Dr. Woo received a letter from his wife, Koharu, about his mother's poor health; he, therefore, requested the president to allow him to visit Japan, but this was not allowed. Eventually, Dr. Woo's mother died, and Dr. Woo mourned that he could not repay his mother for all she had done. This made it into the news, and there was a nationwide effort of sending letters and donations to Dr. Woo. As a memorial to his mother and to meet the needs of his employees, Dr. Woo dug a water well near his laboratory, and named it "Jayucheon" (자유천, short for 자애로운 어머니의 젖 같은 샘) or "The Well that is like the Milk of a Loving Mother".

Many agricultural decisions during the 1950s were made according to Dr. Woo's suggestions, or made by Dr. Woo himself. This included the planting of cosmos flowers to decorate the highways and railroads. Cosmos flowers disseminate easily, and would not be targeted by farmers to feed the livestock because they are toxic in nature. One exception was on the topic of introducing hydroponics, in which Dr. Woo suggested sanitary culture, instead, because it was a much cheaper alternative with the same result; although a hydroponics facility was installed in Suwon, the outcome was poor. The president suggested sending researchers to Japan to learn the secrets of hydroponics, but Dr. Woo said that hydroponics does not require special techniques other than clean water, the right balance of the nutrients, and time. Dr. Woo's team established a sanitary-culture facility in Seoul (the capital city of Korea), and its success was signified when the US military noted the facility's hygienic products and chose the facility to supply its soldier fruits and vegetables. Dr. Woo also succeeded in producing germ-resilient seed potatoes.

== Illness and death ==
Around his 60th birthday, Woo began to have pain in his arm. He could not mediate the illness with medications and treatments, and the problem worsened. Only cortison would allow the pain to abate. But medical professor Kim Joong-hwa recommended Woo to take the medicine only when necessary, as it was not complete in its development, and negative side effects could be possible. Dr. Woo's stomach and intestines began to worsen and, although the conditions were tolerable, he was admitted to the hospital after a medical examination. Although expected to be discharged from the hospital within one month, the problems worsened, and the research employees contacted Dr. Woo's wife, Koharu, about his situation.

Dr. Woo's wife, Koharu, had difficulties trying to visit Korea, but eventually succeeded in obtaining special permission from the Korean government. When she arrived, Dr. Woo promised that they would be able to live together within two to three years, and tried to look healthy.

During this time, the Korean government officially acknowledged Dr. Woo's achievements, and the minister of the agricultural department presented himself at the hospital, to award Dr. Woo a medal. To his wife and research employees, Dr. Woo said, "To die I have no regret; my fatherland acknowledged me." On the dawn of August 10, 1959, Woo Jang-choon died in Korea. He was 61 years old. People across the country mourned his death.

== See also ==
- Chang Yŏngsil

== Bibliography ==
- Baek Sukgi (배석기) (1987). Woongjin Wiinjeongi #30 Woo Jang-Choon (in Korean). Woongjin Publishing Co., Ltd.
- Woojangchun Museum at Life in Korea
- http://kids.hankooki.com/lpage/study/200502/kd2005022215323345690.htm
- http://www.chungnam.rda.go.kr/cn14/agri/flower/fe/fe23.htm
