= Sinmumun =

Gate of Gyeongbokgung in Seoul, South Korea

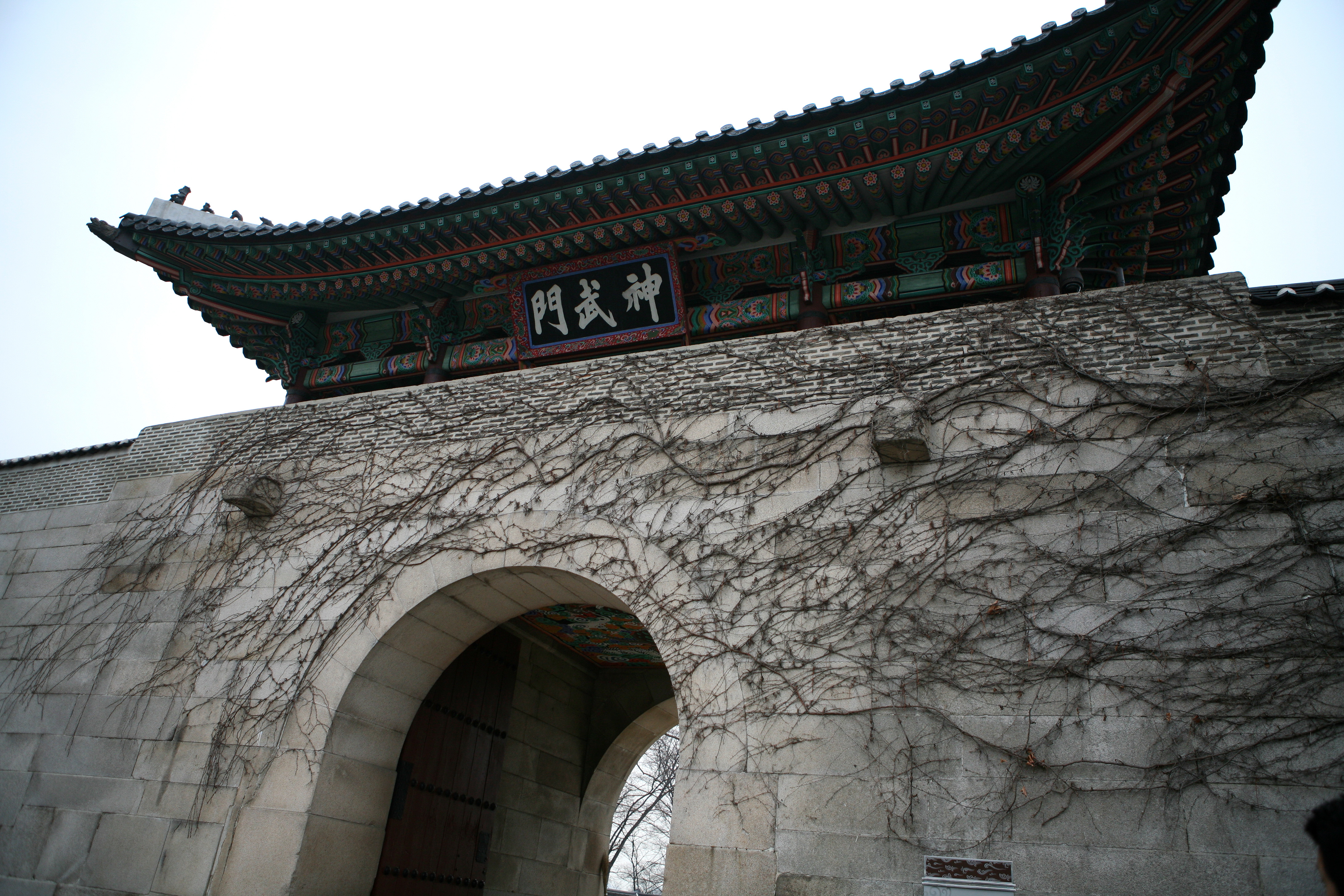
- The gate (2007)

General information
- Coordinates: 37.5835°N 126.9755°E
- Completed: 1433

Korean name
- Hangul: 신무문
- Hanja: 神武門
- RR: Sinmumun
- MR: Sinmumun

Sinmumun (Korean: 신무문; Hanja: 神武門; lit. Black Turtle-Snake Gate) is the north gate of the palace Gyeongbokgung in Seoul, South Korea. It was used generally by military personnel. The gate has generally seen little use, especially in comparison to the other gates. It was often closed.

It was built in 1433. Sejong the Great decided to construct the gate because of a traditional belief that palaces should have four large gates; there were only three at the time. Sinmumun was named in 1475; it is named for a mythical Chinese guardian of the north, the Black Turtle-Snake. That guardian is also painted on the ceiling of the gate. After being destroyed in 1592 during the Imjin War, the gate was rebuilt in 1865. This version of the gate has persisted to the present. The Gojong-era reconstruction saw the gate becoming the entrance to Gyeongmudae, the northern gardens of the palace. Part of the gate's walls collapsed during the colonial period, although they were repaired. It was opened to the public in 1954, but was closed after the May 16 coup of 1961 for security reasons (it is close to the Blue House and to the former military facilities in the palace). It was reopened for public use in 2006 or 2007. It was the final area of the palace to reopen to the public.
