= Karl Ivanovich Weber =

Russian diplomat (1841–1910)

Korean name
- Hangul: 위패
- Hanja: 韋貝
Transcriptions
- Revised Romanization: Wipae
- McCune–Reischauer: Wip'ae

Russian name
- Russian: Карл Иванович Вебер

Karl Ivanovich Weber (also Carl von Waeber; Russian: Карл Ива́нович Ве́бер, 17 June [O.S. 5 June] 1841, Liepāja – 8 January 1910) was a diplomat of the Russian Empire and a personal friend to King Gojong of Korea's Joseon Dynasty. He is best known for his 1885–1897 service as Russia's first consul general to Korea.

== Early life and career ==
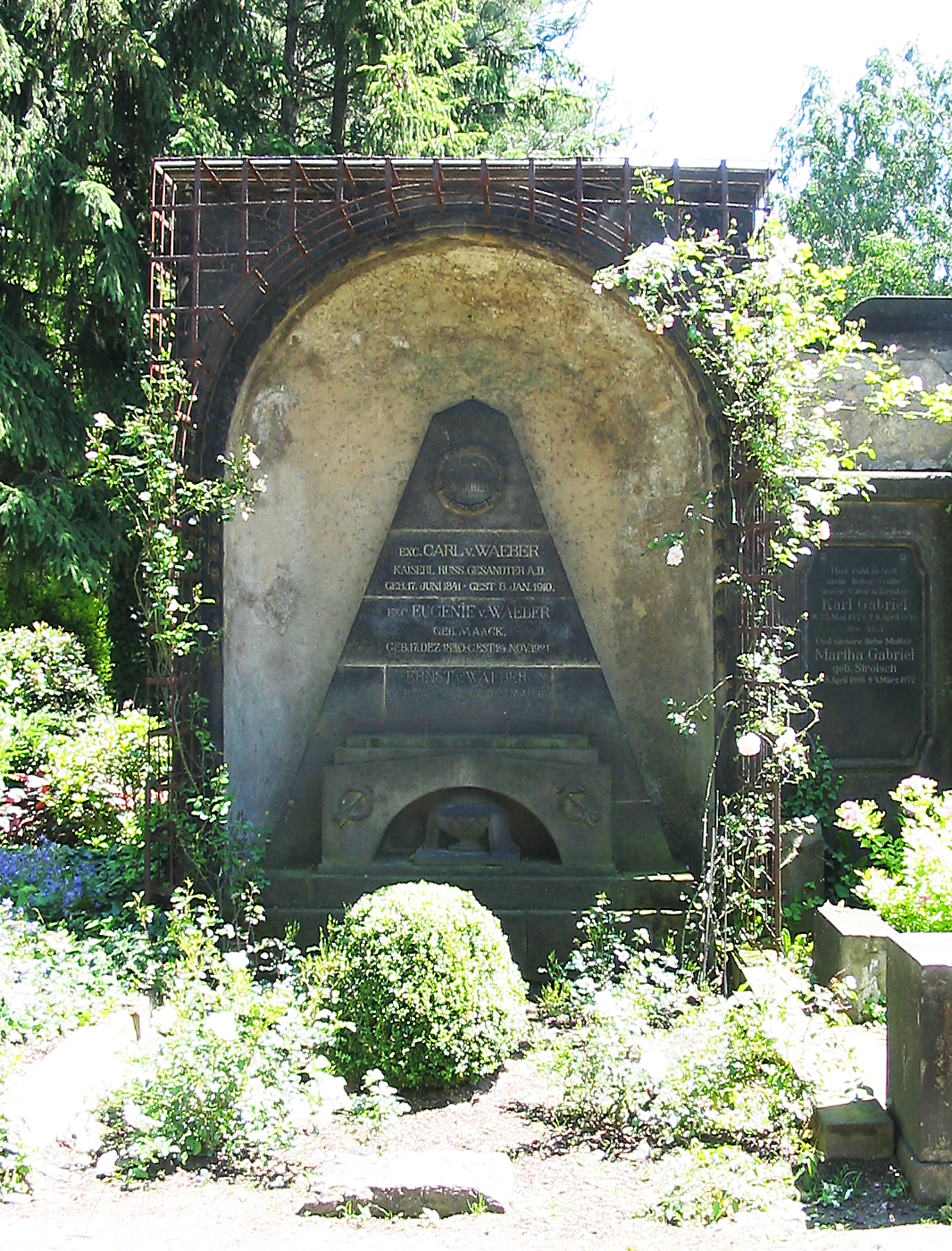
Tomb of Weber, his wife Eugenie (1850–1921), and his son Ernst (1873–1917) in Radebeul

Weber was born in Libau (Liepāja) in the Courland Governorate to a middle-class family, and expressed an interest in the history of Asia from an early age. He graduated from the University of Saint Petersburg in 1865, and joined the diplomatic service the following year. His first overseas posting was in Beijing; he was named Russian Consul in Tianjin in 1882.

== In Korea ==
Weber signed the Treaty of Amity and Commerce between Russia and Korea on 25 June 1884, and moved to Seoul in April of the following year as Russia's first official representative to Korea. He was accompanied by his wife as well as his sister-in-law Antoinette Sontag, a housekeeper from Alsace. His wife had personality conflicts with several other members of the Russian and German expatriate communities of Seoul; in particular, she was believed to be responsible for a malicious rumour in the late 1880s that the German consul, Ferdinand Krien, held orgies in the German legation. During his early service in Korea, Weber developed his friendship with King Gojong; when the Russian government made known their intention to transfer him onward to another posting, King Gojong wrote a letter of protest to Nicholas II of Russia, dated 2 July 1895, in which he praised Weber's wisdom and asked that he be allowed to remain in Korea longer. His request was fulfilled when Alexei Speyer, Weber's intended replacement, was instead posted to Tokyo, Japan.

After the 1895 assassination of Queen Min, Weber personally offered King Gojong refuge in the Russian Legation building in Jeongdong (modern-day Jung-gu, Seoul), where he lived between February 1896 and February 1897. This time marked the height of Russian influence in Korea; Weber was able to persuade King Gojong to appoint a new cabinet consisting of a "pro-Russian faction" led by Yi Wan-yong, Yi Bum-jin, and Yi Yun-yong, and in May 1896 signed the Komura-Waeber Memorandum with his Japanese counterpart Komura Jutarō, granting Russia the right to station four companies of troops in the Korean peninsula, and requiring the Japanese to recognise the new cabinet. Gojong was also quite impressed with Weber's housekeeper Sontag, and would go on to employ her as majordomo in charge of household affairs after he returned to the palace.

In August 1902, Weber was sent to Korea to participate in the celebration of 40th Anniversary of coronation on 5 October 1902. The celebration was delayed to next year's Spring, and then 30 April 1903.

== Later career ==
Speyer finally arrived to replace Weber in September 1897, whereupon he returned to Saint Petersburg. Weber would again visit Seoul in an official capacity in April 1903, on the eve of the Russo-Japanese War, for further talks with King Gojong. He was a recipient of the Order of St. Andrew, Russia's highest order of chivalry. He died in Niederlößnitz and was buried in Kötzschenbroda, today both Radebeul. His tomb was designed by the architects Otto Rometsch (Note: See the article in the German Wikipedia: Otto Rometsch) and Adolph Suppes, with sculptures by Ernst Thalheim. (Note: See the book: Бэлла Пак) .

== Publications ==
- Ch. Waeber (1900). Map of north-eastern China. Shanghai and London. OCLC 354973129, 497551936.
- Ch. de Waeber (1907). Index de la section géographique de la grande encyclopédie chinoise T'ou-chou-tsi-tch'eng [Index of the geographical section of the great Chinese encyclopedia T'ou-chou-tsi-tch'eng] (in French). Saint-Pétersbourg: impr. de l'Académie impériale des sciences. OCLC 185170504, 252061484, 315451509, 458811458, 602347971.
- К. И. Вебер [Ch. de Waeber] (1907). О корейском языке и корейском чтении китайских иероглифов [On the Korean language and reading of Chinese characters] (in Russian). Saint Petersburg. OCLC 62584148, 162379237, 315453262.
- К. И. Вебер [Ch. de Waeber] (1907). Пробная транскрипция всех городов Кореи [Proposed transcription of the names of Korean towns] (in Russian). Saint Petersburg. OCLC 62584149, 162379238, 707158002.

== See also ==
- First Sino-Japanese War
