= Hullyŏndae =

Joseon Army infantry regiment

- Hangul: 훈련대
- Hanja: 訓鍊隊
- RR: Hullyeondae
- MR: Hullyŏndae

The Hullyŏndae (Korean: 훈련대; Hanja: 訓練隊; lit. Military Training Division) was an infantry regiment of the Joseon Army established under Japanese direction as a part of the second Kabo Reform in 1895, the 32nd year of Gojong of Korea's reign. On January 17 in the same year, Japanese legation minister Inoue Kaoru suggested the king found a new regiment of royal guards. This elite regiment, trained and equipped by the Japanese, were officered by members of the old Joseon army.

The regiment consisted of three battalions and a headquarters company, totalling about 1,000 Soldiers. The first battalion was commanded by Major U Pŏmsŏn. The second battalion was commanded by Major Yi Tuhwang, and the third battalion was commanded by Major Yi Chinho. All three officer had participated in military operations against peasant rebels in Donghak and Chinese forces in 1894–1895. The regiment was composed of the most modernised elements of the Joseon Army.

Convinced that Queen Min was conspiring with the Russian Empire to bring Russian troops into the country, the regiment attacked the Imperial Palace on 8 October 1895, allowing a group of Japanese rōnin to assassinate the Empress. They were dissolved on September 13, 1895.

Major Woo Beomseon, the leader of the attack on the Palace, escaped to Japan, where he married a Japanese woman named Sakai Naka and sired Woo Jang-Choon in April 1898. On November 24, 1903, Major Woo was assassinated with a knife by Go Yeong-Geun, sent to kill him by Emperor Gwangmu.

== See also ==
- Korea under Japanese rule
- Imo Incident
- Empress Myeongseong
- Eulmi Incident
