= Internal Princess Consort Hanchang =

Korean consort (1818–1874)

- Hangul: 한창부부인 이씨
- Hanja: 韓昌府夫人 李氏
- RR: Hanchang bubuin Issi
- MR: Hanch'ang pubuin Issi

Internal Princess Consort Hanchang of the Hansan Yi clan (Korean: 한창부부인 이씨; Hanja: 韓昌府夫人 李氏; 1818 – 30 November 1874) was wife of Internal Prince Yeoseong and the mother of Empress Myeongseong, also the maternal grandmother of Emperor Sunjong of Korea. She was killed in a bombing assassination in 1874 for political reasons by Heungseon Daewongun. Her death intensified the feud between him and her daughter.

== Biography ==
Lady Hanchang was born into the aristocratic Hansan Yi clan in 1818 as the daughter of Yi Gyu-nyeon, and his wife, Lady Kim of the Andong Kim clan.

After her future husband's first wife, Lady Oh of the Haeju Oh clan, died in 1833, Lady Yi was arranged to marry Min Chi-rok of the Yeoheung Min clan in 1836 as his second wife. At the time of the marriage, Lady Yi was 18 and Min was 37.

Lady Yi gave birth to a son in 1840, and two daughters in 1843 and 1847, but they all died before reaching the age of 8. It wasn't until when Lady Yi was 33 and Min was 52 years old, that they managed to have a child. Lady Yi gave birth to the future Queen Consort on 17 November 1851 (18 October 1851 in lunar calendar). They named their only child, Min Ja-yeong (민자영; 閔玆暎).

Her husband died with an illness while he was in Sado City on 17 September 1858. This led to Lady Yi and her daughter to move from Seomark-ri, Geundong-myeon, Yeoju to the House of Gamgodang (감고당; 感古堂), (Note: The house that King Sukjong built for Queen Inhyeon's father) where her husband's relatives lived. Lady Yi then raised her daughter for 8 years along with her in-laws until her daughter was 16 years old, moved to the palace and became queen. When living with her in-laws in Gamgodang, it was decided in 1861 that Min Seung-ho would be her adoptive son as it was believed at the time that only males could continue the family line.

When King Gojong's father, Heungseon Daewongun, was looking for a bride, royal relatives of the Yeoheung Min clan had suggested Min Chi-rok's and Lady Yi's daughter, Min Jayeong. Her daughter eventually married King Gojong on 20 March 1866 as his Queen Consort.

When her daughter became Queen Consort, Lady Yi was posthumously honored as "Internal Princess Consort Hanchang" (한창부부인), and her husband was also honored as "Min Chi-rok, Internal Prince Yeoseong" and was appointed as Yeonguijeong after his death.

When Queen Min was expecting in 1871 and 1873, and as per Royal custom for childbirth, Lady Yi was brought into Gyeongbokgung's Gyotae Hall to help ease her daughter's delivery. With both pregnancies bringing a loss, Lady Yi was once again brought to the palace. This time to Changdeokgung's Daejo Hall where she was able to see the birth of her only grandson, Crown Prince Yi Cheok, on 25 March 1874.

She later died from a political bombing assassination on 30 November 1874 along with her adoptive son, Min Seung-ho, Min Chi-gu (Min Seung-ho's father), and Min Seung-ho's son. (Note: Min Seung-ho, Min Seung-ho's son, and his adoptive mother, Gamgodang Hansan Yi, all died on the spot.)

Isabella Bird, a British explorer and writer, wrote about the assassination in her 1898 book Korea and Her Neighbours:

"She had cut many lives short, but in doing so she had not violated Korean tradition and custom, and some excuse for her lies in the fact that soon after the King's accession his father sent to the house of Her Majesty's brother an infernal machine in a shape of a beautiful box, which on being opened exploded, killing her mother, her brother, and her nephew, as well as some others. Since then he (Heungseon Daewongun) plotted against the Queen's own life, and the feud between them was usually at fever heat."

After her death, her daughter and her father-in-law were constantly against one another in politics. The Empress had a few life attempts from then on, but it wasn't until the early morning on 8 October 1895 that she died from an assassination at the age of 43.

== Family ==
- Father
  - Yi Gyu-nyeon (이규년; 李圭年; 1788–?)
- Mother
  - Lady Kim of the Andong Kim clan (안동 김씨; 安東 金氏; 1788–?)
- Husband
  - Min Chi-rok (민치록; 閔致祿; 1799 – 17 September 1858)
    - Father-in-law – Min Gi-hyeon (민기현; 閔耆顯; 1751 – 1 August 1811)
    - Mother-in-law – Lady Jeong of the Yeonil Jeong clan (본관: 연일 정씨, 延日 鄭氏; 1773 – 9 March 1838)
- Children
  - Unnamed son (1840–1847)
  - Unnamed daughter (1843–1849)
  - Unnamed daughter (1847–1852)
  - Adoptive son – Min Seung-ho (민승호; 閔升鎬; 1830 – 30 November 1874)
  - Daughter – Empress Myeongseong of the Yeoheung Min clan (명성황후 민씨; 17 November 1851 – 8 October 1895)
    - Son-in-law – Emperor Gojong of Korea (고종 광무제; 9 September 1852 – 21 January 1919)

== In popular culture ==
- Portrayed by Ahn Yeong-ju in the 1995–1996 KBS1 TV series Dazzling Dawn
- Portrayed by Sunwoo Eun-sook in the 2001–2002 KBS2 TV series Empress Myeongseong
