= Hampyeong O clan =

Korean clan from South Jeolla Province

- Country: Korea
- Current region: Hampyeong County
- Founder: O Jam

Hampyeong O clan (Korean: 함평 오씨; Hanja: 咸平 吳氏) was one of the Korean clans. Their Bon-gwan was in Hampyeong County, South Jeolla Province. According to the research in 2000, the number of Hampyeong O clan was 2845. Their founder was O Jam. O Jam was a 4th son of Oh In yu who was a founder of Haeju Oh clan. Oh In yu came over from China during Seongjong of Goryeo’s reign in Goryeo. O Jam passed Imperial examination during Wonjong of Goryeo’s reign. Then, O Jam successively served as a munha sirang pyeongjangsa (Korean: 문하시랑평장사; Hanja: 門下侍郞平章事) and appointed as Prince of Hampung (Hanja: 咸豊君). After that, O Jam began Hampyeong O clan.

== See also ==
- Korean clan names of foreign origin
