= Yeonil O clan =

Korean clan from North Gyeongsang Province

- Country: Korea
- Current region: Pohang
- Founder: O Yeon gyeong

The Yeonil O clan (Korean: 연일 오씨; Hanja: 延日 吳氏) was one of the Korean clans. Their Bon-gwan was in Pohang, North Gyeongsang Province. According to the research in 1985, the number of Yeonil O clan was 1166. Their founder was O Yeon gyeong. O Yeon gyeong was a 7th descendant of Oh In yu who was a founder of Haeju Oh clan. Oh In yu was naturalized from Song dynasty during Seongjong of Goryeo’s reign in Goryeo.

== See also ==
- Korean clan names of foreign origin
