= Min Chi-rok =

Father of Empress Myeongseong (1800–1858)

- Korean name
- Hangul: 민치록
- Hanja: 閔致祿
- RR: Min Chirok
- MR: Min Ch'irok

Royal title
- Hangul: 여성부원군
- Hanja: 驪城府院君
- RR: Yeoseong buwongun
- MR: Yŏsŏng puwŏn'gun

Min Chi-rok (Korean: 민치록; Hanja: 閔致祿; 17 January 1800 – 23 October 1858), formally honoured as Internal Prince Yeoseong (여성부원군; 驪城府院君). He also known as Duke Hyojeong (효정공; 孝貞公) or Duke Sungan (순간공; 純簡公), was a Korean political figure of the Joseon period. He was the father of Empress Myeongseong and the maternal grandfather of King Sunjong of Korea. After he died, his son-in-law, King Gojong of Korea, promoted him to Uijeongbu and Yeonguijeong.

== Early life ==
Min Chi-rok was born into the aristocratic Yeoheung Min clan on 17 January 1800 (23th day, 12th month of the gimi year, according to the Korean lunar calendar) as the only son of Min Gi-hyeon, and his third wife, Lady Jeong of the Yeonil Jeong clan. Min was a great-great-grandson of Min Jin-hu; Queen Inhyeon's eldest brother. He was also the 16th great-grandson of Min Yu (민유; 閔愉) who was the granduncle of Queen Wongyeong.

Min studied under scholar Oh Hui-sang (오희상) when he was young, and eventually married his daughter, Lady Oh of the Haeju Oh clan, as his first wife. But she later died at the age of 36 in 1833 with no offspring. After mourning for 3 years, he married Yi Gyu-nyeon's daughter, Lady Yi of the Hansan Yi clan in 1836. They eventually had a son and two daughters, but they all died young. His wife then gave birth to a third daughter, Min Ja-yeong, on 17 November 1851 who would become the future Queen Consort to King Gojong. He died with an illness in 1858.

== Legacy ==
After his death, his wife and daughter went to live with his relatives in the House of Gamgodang, the house that King Sukjong built for Queen Inhyeon's father in 1687, until his daughter became Queen.

In 1861, a relative of his clan, Min Seung-ho, became his adoptive son to continue his family line. When Min Ja-yeong became Queen Consort in 1866, he was granted the royal title of "Min Chi-rok, Internal Prince Yeoseong", and appointed as Yeonguijeong after his death. His wife was also posthumously honored as Internal Princess Consort Hanchang (한창부부인). His first wife was also granted the royal title of "Internal Princess Consort Haeryeong" (해령부부인) as she was also considered the mother of Queen Min.

== Aftermath ==
On 30 November 1874, his wife and their adoptive son, Min Seung-ho, died from a bombing assassination.

Prior to his wife's death, his daughter had started to involve herself in politics. She informally became known as Queen Min. Her political involvement eventually brought the Yeoheung Min clan more influence in politics and life threats from the Queen's father-in-law, Heungseon Daewongun, who sought to get rid of her.

Queen Min was assassinated in her husband's private living quarters on 8 October 1895. Her death brought rage from various western powers, as Queen Min brought their influence into Joseon Dynasty politics.

== Family ==
- Father
  - Min Gi-hyeon (민기현; 閔耆顯; 1751 – 1 August 1811)
- Mother
  - Biological - Lady Jeong of the Yeonil Jeong clan (연일 정씨; 延日 鄭氏; 1773 – 9 March 1838)
  - Step - Lady Jo the Haman Jo clan (함안 조씨; 咸安 趙氏; 1748 – 4 April 1774)
  - Step - Lady Yi of the Seongju Yi clan (성주 이씨; 星州 李氏; 1763 – 15 March 1792)
- Wives and their respective issue(s):
  - Internal Princess Consort Haeryeong of the Haeju Oh clan (해령부부인 해주 오씨; 海寧府夫人 海州 吳氏; 1798 – 15 March 1833)
  - Internal Princess Consort Hanchang of the Hansan Yi clan (한창부부인 한산 이씨; 韓昌府夫人 李氏; 1818 – 30 November 1874)
    - Adoptive son - Min Seung-ho (민승호; 閔升鎬; 1830 – 30 November 1874)
    - Unnamed son (1840–1847)
    - Unnamed daughter (1843–1849)
    - Unnamed daughter (1847–1852)
    - Daughter - Min Ja-yeong, Empress Myeongseong of the Yeoheung Min clan (민자영; 閔玆暎; 17 November 1851 – 8 October 1895) (명성황후 민씨)
      - Son-in-law - Yi Myeong-bok, Emperor Gojong of Korea (이명복 대한제국 고종황제; 8 September 1852 – 21 January 1919)

== In popular culture ==
- Portrayed by Lee Do-ryeon in 2001–2002 KBS2 TV series Empress Myeongseong
