= Yeoheung Min clan =

Korean clan from Gyeonggi Province

- Country: Korea
- Current region: Yeoju, Gyeonggi Province
- Founder: Min Ching-do
- Connected members: Princess Consort Samhanguk; Queen Wongyeong; Grand Princess Consort Min; Royal Consort Suk-ui; Royal Noble Consort Jeong; Princess Consort Min; Queen Inhyeon; Princess Consort Min; Min Chi-rok; Grand Internal Princess Consort Sunmok; Empress Myeongseong; Min Yeong-hwan; Empress Sunmyeong; Min Yeong-chan; Min Won-sik; Min Yoongi
- Website: minssi.net

The Yeoheung Min clan (Korean: 여흥 민씨; Hanja: 驪興 閔氏) is a Korean clan that traces its origin to Yeoju, Gyeonggi Province. The 2015 Korean census counted 167,124 members of the Yeoheung Min clan.

== Origin ==
The progenitor of the Yeoheung Min clan was long thought to be Min Ching-do (민칭도, 閔稱道), who settled in Goryeo after serving as an emissary from the Song dynasty. Min Ching-do was believed to descend from Min Sun, the second brightest disciple of Confucius. However, this story is most likely a later fabrication during Goryeo dynasty. Another theory suggests the clan originated from Yeongwollu Mingul Maamgul in Hyang-ri, Yeoju (영월루 민굴, 마암굴 閔窟;여주).

This speculation stems from a poem by Yi Kyu-bo to Min Sik, asserting Min Sik's lineage from Min Ja-geon (Min Sun) and Yi Kyu-bo's own descent from the legendary Chinese philosopher Laozi. However, skepticism arises due to the poem's ulterior motive—Yi Kyu-bo's attempt to secure a government position (벼슬) by flattering Min Sik. Yi Kyu-bo's surname, Yi (李), is uniquely Korean, unrelated to Laozi.

In Goryeosa, the main historical record of Goryeo, individuals with the Min surname appear before Min Ching-do's time, such as Min Ghang (민강, 閔剛), Min Hap (민합, 閔郃), and Min Ga-geo (민가거, 閔可擧). Epitaphs of Min Ga-geo's great-grandchildren, Min Su (민수, 閔脩) and Min Yeong (민영, 閔瑛), discovered archaeologically, list their hometown as Hwangryeo (황려, 黄驪). These findings suggest the Yeoheung Min clan originated in the current Yeoju (여주) region of Gyeonggi-do (경기도) and gained recognition during the Later Three Kingdoms period. While Min Ching-do is considered the progenitor, the earlier lineage remains obscured by time.

In summary, the Yeoheung Min clan, rooted in the Yeoju region of Gyeonggi-do, traces its lineage to Min Ching-do. Although evidence points to a more ancient origin during the early Three Kingdoms period, Min Ching-do is recognized as the progenitor due to the late compilation of genealogy.

== Goryeo dynasty ==
In the Goryeo dynasty, the Min clan today was then known as the Hwangryeo Min clan (황려 민씨, 黃驪 閔氏) as its clan ancestral seat at the time was called Hwangryeo-hyeon (황려현).

Min Yeong-mo took the government exam in 1138 and was promoted to Munhasirangdongjongseomun (문하시랑동중서문하평장사) and Taejataesa oheulratgo (태자태사에 올랐고).

Min Sik (민식, 閔湜; ? – 1201) the eldest son of Min Yeong-mo, served as Minister of Justice (형부상서; 刑部尙書; hyŏngbu sangsŏ) after passing the examination during the reign of Myeongjong of Goryeo. Min Yeong-mo's second son, Min Gong-gyu (민공규, 閔公珪), served as Panbyeongbusa and Tutor of the Crown Prince (태자소보; 太子少保; t'aeja sobo), and his descendants continued to produce a large number of high-ranking officials, and grew into a prestigious and aristocratic clan to which allowed them to marry into the royal family in the late Goryeo dynasty.

Min Ji (민지, 閔漬; 1248 – 1326) the great-grandson of Min Sik, assumed to the Department of Literature in 1266 during King Wonjong's reign, and became Chuseongsujeongseongnorigongsinyi (추성수정성보리공신이). The king later granted Min Ji with royal title of Internal Prince Yeoheung (여흥부원군). This eventually changed the Min clan's name from Hwangryeo (황려, 黃驪) to Yeoheung (여흥, 驪興). Thus becoming the Yeoheung Min clan (여흥 민씨, 驪興 閔氏) known today.

== Joseon dynasty ==
Eventually the clan separated into distinct households. Min Sik's household was superior to Min Gong-gyu's in the number of bureaucrats discharged and the number of high-ranking officials.

In the first half of the Joseon dynasty, the factions of each family expanded, and they were clearly distinguished into those in which families flourished and those that did not. The descendants of Min Sik, for example, the eldest son, Min Sang-jeong, and his second son, Min Sang-baek, were the great-grandsons of Min Ji's descendants.

The descendants of Min Gong-gyu, for example his great-grandson, Min Jong-yu and his eldest son Min Jeok. In particular, the family line that leads to the Min Jeok's 3rd generation descendants, Min Byeon and Min Je branch (문도공파; Mundo Gongpa), is considered the most prestigious among the Yeoheung Min clan in the early Joseon dynasty as they produced their first Queen (Joseon's third queen consort); Queen Wongyeong, Min Je's daughter.

The branch from Min Yu (민유, 閔愉), Min Byeon's older brother, held the same prestige but not as grand as his younger brother's. But wasn't until King Heonjong’s reign that they produced their first queen, Queen Inhyeon; a daughter from his descendant, Min Yu-jung (민유중; 1630 – 29 June 1687). They eventually produced their second and final queen (posthumously empress) during the late 19th century.

In the early Joseon dynasty, the Yeoheung Min clan met all the requirements such factors as close to the core of aristocratic power, such as the generation of a large number of former students and high-ranking bureaucrats centering on these families, fulfillment of public service, and the intermarriage with the royal family, as well as the prosperity of descendants. Even after the founding of the Joseon dynasty, it has continued to maintain its status as a prestigious bongwan since the late Goryeo dynasty.

In terms of the number of scholars, the family lines of Min Sik and Min Ji produced an overwhelming majority than the family lines of Min Gong-gyu and Min Jong-yu. But Min Jong-yu's family line was far more dominant in the generation of high-ranking officials of rank 3 or of higher ranks, which is the result of the four Min clan produced during the Joseon dynasty.

Since one of the three queens were from the Min Gong-gyu-Min Jong-yu family line, it seems that the recruitment of relatives due to the queen's generation played a greater role in the factors for the advancement of the Min Gong-gyu-Min Jong-yu affiliates to higher positions than in the past.

After the founding of the Joseon dynasty, the Min Sik and Min Ji families of the Yeoheung Min clan were connected to the royal family due to the queen's maternal grandfather and thus raising the status of the family tremendously. However, the misfortunes of the descendant granddaughters from the Min Ji family line who were chosen as princesses and wives of royal court officials continued.

The four sons of Min Je, who were the core influence of the Yeoheung Min clan, were killed one after another by King Taejong's strategy to strengthen royal power and the removal of in-law's overpowering royal authority. The prestige of the Yeoheung Min clan fell for a while, but during the reign of King Sejong, their status was restored and continued to produce queens and princesses.

Throughout the Joseon dynasty, the Yeoheung Min clan has produced 242 senior government officials, 12 Sangshin (prime ministers), 6 Jongmyo scholars, and two queen consorts: Queen Wongyeong (consort of King Taejong of Joseon and the mother of King Sejong the Great), and Queen Inhyeon (consort of King Sukjong of Joseon).

As well as eight princess consorts: Princess Consort Samhanguk (Queen Wongyeong's older sister and Prince Wansan's wife), Grand Internal Princess Consort Min (Grand Prince Hoean's wife), Princess Consort Pungdeok (Prince Milseong's wife), Princess Consort Min (Prince Yang's wife), Princess Consort Min (Prince Yangwon's wife), Princess Consort Min (Heungseon Daewongun's mother), and Grand Internal Princess Consort Sunmok (Emperor Gojong's mother and Heungseon Daewongun's wife).

The clan also had two royal consorts throughout the dynasty: Royal Noble Consort Jeong (a concubine of King Seonjo) and Royal Consort Suk-ui (a concubine of Yeonsangun).

When the Korean Empire was proclaimed, two women of the clan were posthumously honored as empresses: Empress Myeongseong (consort and regent of Emperor Gojong and the mother of Emperor Sunjong) and Empress Sunmyeonghyo (consort of Emperor Sunjong). Empress Myeongseong is a controversial figure, who is admired for her political crafts and her determination to resist Japanese influence towards the late 19th century of the Joseon dynasty, but also condemned for exacerbating the pervasive corruption by appointing her fellow Yeoheung Mins to important positions within the government.

== See also ==
- Min (Korean surname)
