= Haeju Oh clan =

Korean clan from Hwanghae Province

- Country: Korea
- Current region: Haeju
- Founder: Oh In yu
- Connected members: O Yun-gyeom; Oh Sang-jin; Oh Joon; Oh Se-hoon; O Yeong-su
- Website: hjo.co.kr

Haeju Oh clan (Korean: 해주 오씨; Hanja: 海州 吳氏) is a Korean clan. Their Bon-gwan is in Haeju, Hwanghae Province. As of 2000, the clan has a membership of 422,735. Their founder was Oh In yu, who was the governor of Haeju county during the era of Goryeo.
