= Prince Waneun =

Korean prince (1842–1881)

- Korean name
- Hangul: 이재선
- Hanja: 李載先
- RR: I Jaeseon
- MR: I Chaesŏn

Royal title
- Hangul: 완은군
- Hanja: 完恩君
- RR: Waneungun
- MR: Wanŭn'gun

Prince Waneun (Korean: 완은군; Hanja: 完恩君; 1 August 1842 – 28 October 1881) was a prince of the Korean Empire and a member of the Joseon period royal family. He was a descendant of Prince Namyeon and an illegitimate son of Heungseon Daewongun and his concubine Kyeseongwol. He was an older half-brother of Gojong of Korea and Prince Imperial Heung, and a half-uncle of Prince Youngsun and Emperor Sunjong of Korea. His personal name was Yi Jae-seon (이재선; 李載先).

In 1881, he was implicated in a conspiracy to dethrone Gojong and his queen, and was executed.

== Biography ==
=== Family ===
Yi Jae-seon's actual birth year is unknown, but is thought to be around 1841–1842, or 1847. Yi Jae-seon was born in Unhyeongung, Ahguk-dong in Hanseong. He was the first, though illegitimate, son of Prince Heungseon (son of Prince Namyeon and a distant descendant of Prince Inpyeong). His early life is unknown. One opinion of him was that he was foolish or unintelligent. Subsequently his father's legal wife, Grand Internal Princess Consort Sunmok, gave birth to Yi Jae-myeon and Yi Myeong-bok (Gojong, later the 26th King of the Joseon Dynasty and the First Emperor of Korea.)

Yi Jae-seon was married to Lady Shin of Pyeongsan Shin clan. His wife, the daughter of Judge Shin Seok- wan (申錫完), survived until 1922 at least. They had several children. Other than the eldest son, Lee Ju-yong, the eldest daughter, Lee Chang-hwa, and one second daughter, their names and whereabouts have not been identified.

=== Military career ===
At some age, Yi Jae-seon passed the test to become a military official (무과 武科). In 1863, his younger half-brother Gojong became King of Joseon. Queen Dowager Hyoyu (then known as Queen Sinjeong) was appointed Regent because Gojong was still a child. His father Prince Heungseon was appointed Daewongun. Some months later, Queen Dowager Hyoyu gave the title of Regent to his father.

On 12 April 1864 (1st year of King Gojong's reign), Yi Jae-seon passed the special civil service exam for royal relatives, ranking third. On 21 June 1864 he was appointed the chief of the Military Training Center (訓鍊院).

After 1864, he was appointed by way of promotion to further military positions.

In November 1874, his father was removed from power, which according to legend angered him. Yi Jae-sun also perhaps supported his father due to the fact that he was a professional soldier (of relatively low rank).

=== Treason ===
At some point in 1881 or possibly earlier, Heungseon Daewongun's close associates Ahn Ki-young (安驥永) and Kwon Jeong-ho(權鼎鎬), who were dissatisfied with Heungseon Daewongun being forced to resign, prepared for a military coup designed to oust Gojong from the throne and instead place Yi Jae-seon on the throne. On 3 September 1881, these two men drew up a plan to gather people and prepare for a rebellion. They described the purpose of their rebellion as an anti-Japanese revolt, Towae (討倭). They contacted Kang Dal-seon (姜達善), a Confucian scholar in Yeongnam, and also interacted with Isolationist activists who opposed liberal reform and the opening of Korea to foreign influence. Participants of the coup were the conservative Wijeongchoksa Group (위정척사파).

On 3 September, Lee Pung-rae (李豐來 ), an officer of Gwangju Castle, who had decided to participate in the rebellion, reported the plot to the authorities, and most of the castle officers surrendered to them. Those involved were arrested on 6 September. The arrests included Ahn Ki-young, Kwon Jeong-ho, Lee Cheol-gu, and about 30 other people who were implicated. Further low-ranking officials from Gwangju also surrendered.

Yi Yun-yong (Yi Jae-sun's brother-in-law) also surrendered to the authorities, having confessed to Gojong and the queen consort.

The queen was also given information of the plot by another source.

Ahn Ki-young, Kwon Jeong-ho, and the others who were arrested were interrogated and later executed.

=== Death ===
It was not initially clear as to whether Yi Jae-seon was directly involved or what his actual participation was. He was arrested, interrogated and sentenced to death.

Some aspects of what happened thereafter are unclear. He was imprisoned on Jeju Island. It is said that his execution ground was Seodaemun(Donuimun) in Hanseong.

On 28 October 1881, he received punishment by poisoning and was buried in Yangju in Gyeonggi Province. His grave was later moved to Wangsipri-dong in Seoul. In 1909, it was removed to Siheung-dong in Seoul. The current status of the grave is unknown.

On 15 October 1907, he was appointed to Prince Imperial Waneun, by emperor Sunjong of Korea, his half-nephew. But this posthumous title was not immediately granted.

== Ancestry ==
Ancestors of Prince Imperial Waneun

16. Yi Chin-ik; (great-great-grandson of Prince Inpyeong)
8. Yi Byeong-won
17. Lady Jo of Hanyang Jo clan
4. Prince Namyeon
9. Lady Jeong of the Yeonil Jeong clan
2. Heungseon Daewongun
20. Min baek-heon
10. Min Gyeong-hyeok
5. Princess Consort Min
11. Lady Han of the Cheongju Han clan
1. Yi Jae-sun, Prince Imperial Waneun
3. Gyeseongwol

== Family ==
- Father
  - Yi Ha-Eung, Grand Internal Prince Heungseon (이하응 흥선대원군; 21 December 1820 – 22 February 1898)
- Mother
  - Gyeseongwol (계성월; 桂成月)
- Wife
  - Princess Consort Shin of the Pyeongsan Shin clan (11 August 1844 - ?) (군부인 평산 신씨)
- Daughters
  - Yi Chang-hwa (이창화; 1867–1937)
  - Unnamed daughter
- Son
  - Yi Ju-yong (이주용, 李𡓣鎔; ?–?)
  - Adoptive son: Yi Gwan-yong (자작 이관용; 李土 灌鎔; 13 February 1891–?)

== Popular culture ==
- Portrayed by Kim Hui-ra in the 1990–1991 MBC TV series 500 Years of Joseon Dynasty.
- Portrayed by Park Hyeon in the 1995 KBS2 TV series The Radiant Dawn.
- Portrayed by Lee Woo-suk in the 2001–2002 KBS2 TV series Empress Myeongseong.

== See also ==
- Heungseon Daewongun
- Unhyeongung
- Gojong of Korea
- Prince Imperial Yeongseon
- Prince Imperial Heung
- Sunjong of Korea
- History of Korea
