= Empress Myeongseong (TV series) =

2001–2002 South Korean TV series

- Hangul: 명성황후
- Hanja: 明成皇后
- RR: Myeongseong hwanghu
- MR: Myŏngsŏng hwanghu
- Genre: Historical
- Written by: Jung Ha-yeon
- Directed by: Yoon Chang-bum; Shin Chang-suk
- Starring: Lee Mi-yeon; Choi Myung-gil; Lee Jin-woo; Yoo Dong-geun
- Music by: Lee Kyung-Seop
- Ending theme: "If I Leave" (나 가거든/Na Kakeodeun) by Jo Sumi
- Country of origin: South Korea
- Original language: Korean
- No. of episodes: 124

Production
- Producer: Yoon Yong-hoon
- Production locations: Kyeongbok Palace, South Korea
- Running time: 60 minutes Wednesdays and Thursdays at 21:50 (KST)
- Production companies: Samhwa Networks; GM Agency

Original release
- Network: KBS2
- Release: May 9, 2001 – July 18, 2002

Empress Myeongseong (Korean: 명성황후) is a 2001 and 2002 South Korean television series that aired on KBS2.

== Background ==
Empress Myeongseong is considered the last empress of Korea. She was assassinated in 1895.

== Cast ==
=== Main ===
- Choi Myung-gil as Empress Myeongseong (episodes 82-124)
  - Lee Mi-yeon as Empress Myeongseong (episodes 1, 10-81)
    - Moon Geun-young as Min Ja-yeong (young Empress Myeongseong)
- Lee Jin-woo as King Gojong
  - Lee In (Note: Credited as Lee Joon.) as young Gojong
- Yoo Dong-geun as Grand Internal Prince Heungseon

=== Supporting ===
Royal Family

- Kim Yong-rim - Grand Royal Queen Dowager Jo
- Kim Jeong-ha - Royal Queen Dowager Hong
- Yoo Hye-young - Queen Cheorin
- Baek Seung-woo - Sungjong of Korea
  - Lee Tae-ri (Note: Credited as Lee Min-ho.) and Kwak Jung-wook - young Sunjong
- Lee Yu-ri - Empress Sunmyeong
  - Park Eun-bin and Kim Soo-yeong - young Empress Sunmyeong
- Jung Seon-gyeong - Royal Consort Gwi-in of Gyeongju Yi clan
- Lee Jae-eun - Royal Consort Gwi-in of the Deoksu Jang clan
- Kim Se-ah - Royal Consort Gwi-in of the Haeju Jeong clan
- Seo Mi-ae - Imperial Noble Consort Sunheon of the Yeongwol Eom clan
- Kang Seong-hyeon - Prince Wanhwa; Consort Yi Gwi-in's son
- Kang Seong-min - Prince Uihwa; Consort Jang Gwi-in's son
  - Kim Jong-ho and Lee Pung-woon - young Prince Uihwa
- Lee Ju-eun - Kim Su-deok, Princess Consort Yeongwon; Prince Uihwa's wife

Palace/Inner Court

- Hwang Beom-sik - Palace Lady Lee; Gojong's servant
- Lee Geon - Palace Lady Kang; Empress Myeongseong's servant
- Kim Bo-mi - Palace Lady Hong; Hong Gye-hun's younger sister
- Hong Yeo-jin - Palace Lady Yun; Grand Queen Dowager Jo's servant
- Lee Ji-eun - Palace Lady of Junggung Hall
- Yoon Yeong-ju - Palace Lady of Daejeon Hall
- Choi Yeong-wan - Consort Yi Gwi-in's servant
- Hong Il-gwon - Hong Gye-hun; Palace Lady Hong's elder brother

Empress Myeongseong's family/Yeoheung Min clan

- Sunwoo Eun-sook - Lady Yi of Gamgodang; Min Ja-yeong's mother and Min Chi-rok's wife
- Lee Do-ryeon - Min Chi-rok; Min Ja-yeong's father
- Kim Hyo-won - Min Seung-ho; Empress Myeongseong's adoptive older brother
- Kim Seong-han - Min Gyeom-ho; Empress Myeongseong's adoptive uncle
- Hyeon Seok - Min Tae-ho; Empress Sunmyeong's father
- Kim Byeong-se - Min Gyu-ho
- Kim Bong-geun - Min Yeong-wi; distant nephew of Empress Myeongseong
- Kim Gwang-yeong - Min Yeong-ik; Empress Sunmyeong's older brother
- Kim Yeong-gi - Min Eung-sik

Unhyeongung

- Lee Deok-hee - Grand Internal Princess Consort Yeoheung; Heungseon Daewongun's wife and King Gojong's mother
- Han Beom-hee - Yi Jae-myeon
- Ahn Seung-min - Yi Jun-yong; Heungseon Daewongun's grandson and Gojong's nephew
- Jeong Jin-gak - Cheon Hui-yeon; Heungseon Daewongun's henchman
- Yoo Jong-geun - Jang Sun-gyu; Heungseon Daewongun's henchman
- Lee Gi-yeol - Ha Jeong-il; Heungseon Daewongun's henchman
- Jeong Jin-hwa - Ahn Pil-ju; Heungseon Daewongun's henchman
- Lee Gyeong-yeong - Heo Ok; Heungseon Daewongun's henchman
- Kim Hye-sun - Chuwol; Heungseon Daewongun's concubine
- Lee Hyeon-gyeong - Ok San
- Ki Jeong-su - Shin Cheol-gyun
- Lee Won-yong - Ahn Gi-yeong
- Lee Woo-seok - Yi Jae-seon

Imo Incident

- Kim Seong-hwan - Min Gyeom-ho; Grand Princess Min's younger brother
- Maeng Ho-rim - Kim Bo-hyeon
- Lee Jae-yeon - Kim Chun-yeong
- Kim Dae-hwan - Yoo Bok-man
- Kim Jin-tae - Kim Jeong-son
- Kim Ji-bok - Yoo Chun-man
- Kim Tae-hyeong - Administrator Seon Hye-jeong
- Yun Gwan-yong - Sim Sang-hun

Kapsin Coup

- Lee Byeong-ok - Kim Ok-gyun
- Cha Cheol-su - Park Yeong-hyo
- Lee Won-hui - Hong Yeong-sik
- Hong Jeong-ok - Seo Jae-pil
- Lee Gi-chil - Yun Chi-ho

Donghak Peasant Revolution

- Jeong Byeong-ok - Jeon Bong-jun
- Lee Gye-yeong - Dong Hak-gun

Eulmi Incident

- Hong Il-kwon - Hong Gye-hun; Palace Lady Hong's older brother and palace bodyguard who protected Empress Myeongseong at the time of the Imo Incident and gained trust. After that, he continued to protect Empress Myeongseong, but was killed while resisting the Japanese during the Eulmi Incident.
- Kim Jun-mo - Lee Gyeong-jik
- Oh Seong-yeol - Woo Beom-seon
- Kim Bong-geun - Yun Seok-woon
- Yun Tae-sul - Hullyeondae soldier

Extended

- Lee Yeong-hu - Prince Heungin; Heungseon Daewongun's older brother
- Eom Yoo-shin - Prince Heungin's wife
- Jeon In-taek - Lee Yong-ik
- Kim Sang-sun - Jo Du-sun
- Choi Sang-hun - Jo Yeong-ha; Grand Queen Royal Dowager Jo's 5th cousin
- Song Jae-ho - Kim Jwa-geun; Queen Cheorin's relative and head of the Andong Kim clan
- Park Yeong-ji - Kim Byeong-hak
- Jeong Seong-mo - Kim Byeong-gi; Kim Jwa-geun's adoptive son
- Park Cheol-ho - Kim Byeong-guk; Kim Byeong-hak's younger brother
- Im Byeong-gi - Kim Byeong-si
- Kwon Ki-seon - Kim Byeong-si's wife
- Kim Ju-yeong - Lee Gyeong-ha
- Heo Gi-ho - Yi Jae-won; Heungseon Daewongun's nephew and Gojong's cousin
- Jeon Seong-hwan - Shin Heon
- Yun Sun-cheol - Lee Yu-won
- Yun Deok-yong - Hong Sun-mok; Father of Hong Young-sik. He commits suicide when his son is murdered in the Kapsin Coup
- Lee Shin-jae - Sim Soon-taek
- Seo Kwon-sun - Sim Soon-taek's wife
- Park Chil-yong - Kang Ro
- Kim In-tae - Shin Eung-jo
- Yang Yeong-jun - Jeong Gi-hoe
- Kim Gyeong-ha - Yang Hyeon-su
- Yu Byeong-jun - Han Gye-won
- Kang Man-hui - Yun Ung-ryeol
- Heo Hyeon-ho - Park Gyu-su
- Jang Gi-yong - Kim Yun-sik
- Kim Hyeong-il - Eo Yun-jong
- Kim Tae-gi - Kim Hong-jib
- Kang In-gi - Yi Wan-yong
- Lee Dae-ro - Choi Ik-hyeon
- Kim Rin - Lee Gyeong-ha

Japanese Legation Group

- Lee Il-ung - Kuroda Kiyotaka
- Seo Sang-ik - Hanabusa Yoshitada
- Park Geun-hyeong - Inoue Kaoru
- Im Hyeok - Miura Gorō
- Kim Byeong-gi - Okamoto Ryūnosuke
- Yun Ju-sang - Itō Hirobumi
- Kang Tae-gi - Mutsu Munemitsu
- Kim Ha-gyun - Saionji Kinmochi
- Kim Sang-sun - Daekjoe Shinichiro
- Lee Do-ryeon - Shiba Shirō/Tokai Sanshi
- Kim Seong-ryeong - Michiko
- Jeong Ui-gab - Japanese man Sasaki
- Yang Jae-won - Japanese military officer

Qing Dynasty figures

- Nam Il-woo - Li Hongzhang
- Park Jin-seong - Yuan Shikai
- Park Gyeong-deuk - Wu Changqing
- Kwon Hyeok-ho - Ding Ruchang
- Park Yong-sik - Ma Jianzhong
- Jeong Bong-yeon - Jubok
- Moon Hoe-won - Wu Jo-yu
- Lee Jong-gu - Yeo Seok-chang
- Na Han-il - Zhang Peilun
- Na Gi-su - Zhang Shusheng
- Jo In-po - Ye Zhichao
- Kim Mu-saeng - Li Qingfeng
- Lee Jae-ryong - Jin Shudang
- Kim Kang-il - Aesingakra Hyukhye
- Jeon Il-beom - Huang Zunxian

German figures

- Lee Cham - Paul Möllendorff, also known as Mok In-deok; A German who gained support from the Min family and was in charge of diplomacy and finances.
- Lee Jong-rae - Edward Jape; a German Consulate General

Russian figures

- ? - Afanasy Seredin-Sabatin; Russian military officer
- ? - Karl Ivanovich Weber; He strives to expand Russian power in Joseon through the Imperial Russian Federation. When Empress Myeongseong leans toward her pro-Russia, she actively cooperates with it (discussing arms imports), but is consistent with a passive attitude when the Eulmi Incident takes place. Later, when the Agwan collapse occurred, he led the pro-Russian cabinet and tried to gain interest in Korea.
- ? - Weber's wife
- Kim Jin-ah - Marie Sontag; German-Russian woman. Executioner of Weber and interpreter of the Imperial Russian Legation. She speaks fluent Russian in a scene where Prince Weber and Empress Myeongseong discuss arms imports.

Britain figures

- Kim Rin (Lynne Louise Kim) - Isabella Bird; An English geographer and writer who wrote Korea and its neighbors, a story of her travels to Joseon. In the first scene of episode 1, a western woman played Isabella Budd Bishop, who is clumsy in the Joseon Dynasty, but eats rice with chopsticks.
- ? - William Esden; British Consulate General

American figures

- ? - Dayi; A foreign training instructor who disbanded a training unit trained by a Japanese military officer and took charge of training the newly created demonstrators. At the time of the Eulmi Incident, he led the protesters against the Japanese army, but was defeated and taken prisoner due to the inferiority of the troops.
- ? - Mary F. Scranton; founder of Ehwa Girls' School (later Ehwa Woman's University)
- ? - Pateu (Lucius Foote); an American corporate executive
- ? - Horace Allen; a Methodist missionary and doctor
- ? - Yang-ui; a doctor
- ? - Francis Ann; Horace Allen's wife
- ? - Denny; the successor to Mok In-deok and a diplomatic adviser
- ? - Nickson

== Production ==
The role of the young Empress Myeongseong in the drama was played by Moon Geun-young (episodes 1–9), while the adult Empress was portrayed by Lee Mi-yeon (episodes 10–80). Originally planned as a 100-episode series, the drama was extended by 24 episodes due to its unexpected popularity. However, Lee Mi-yeon had only signed on for 80 episodes, so Choi Myung-gil took over the role from episode 81, which covered the Kapsin Coup, and played the character until the end.

It was initially believed that Lee Mi-yeon refused to extend her appearance in the drama, but it was later revealed that this was not the case. From the beginning, her contract with the production company was for 80 episodes, not the originally planned 100 episodes. When this fact became public, KBS and the drama's production team faced significant criticism.

== Reception ==
The version of Empress Myeongseong played by Lee Mi-yeon was portrayed as a tragic heroine with an angelic image, drawing viewers and achieving ratings of over 30%. However, from the spring of 2002, when the SBS drama special Successful Story of a Bright Girl aired, ratings began to decline. After the lead actress was changed to Choi Myung-gil, ratings plummeted to single digits. Opinions are divided on whether Lee Mi-yeon or Choi Myung-gil gave the better performance: Lee Mi-yeon played a pure and delicate character who awakened to the necessity of political power, while Choi Myung-gil portrayed an intelligent and politically adept heroine.

== Awards ==
2001 KBS Drama Awards

- Top Excellence Award, Actress: Lee Mi-yeon
- Best Supporting Actor: Kim Sung-hwan
- Best Supporting Actress: Kim Bo-mi
- PD of the Year Award: Yoon Chang-bum

2002 Baeksang Arts Awards

- Best Actor in TV: Yoo Dong-geun

2002 KBS Drama Awards

- Daesang/Grand Prize: Yoo Dong-geun
- Top Excellence Award, Actress: Choi Myung-gil

== See also ==
- The Last Empress (Broadway musical)
- Society in the Joseon dynasty
