= Anti-appeasement steles =

19th century monuments in South Korea

Anti-appeasement Stele
- 척화비
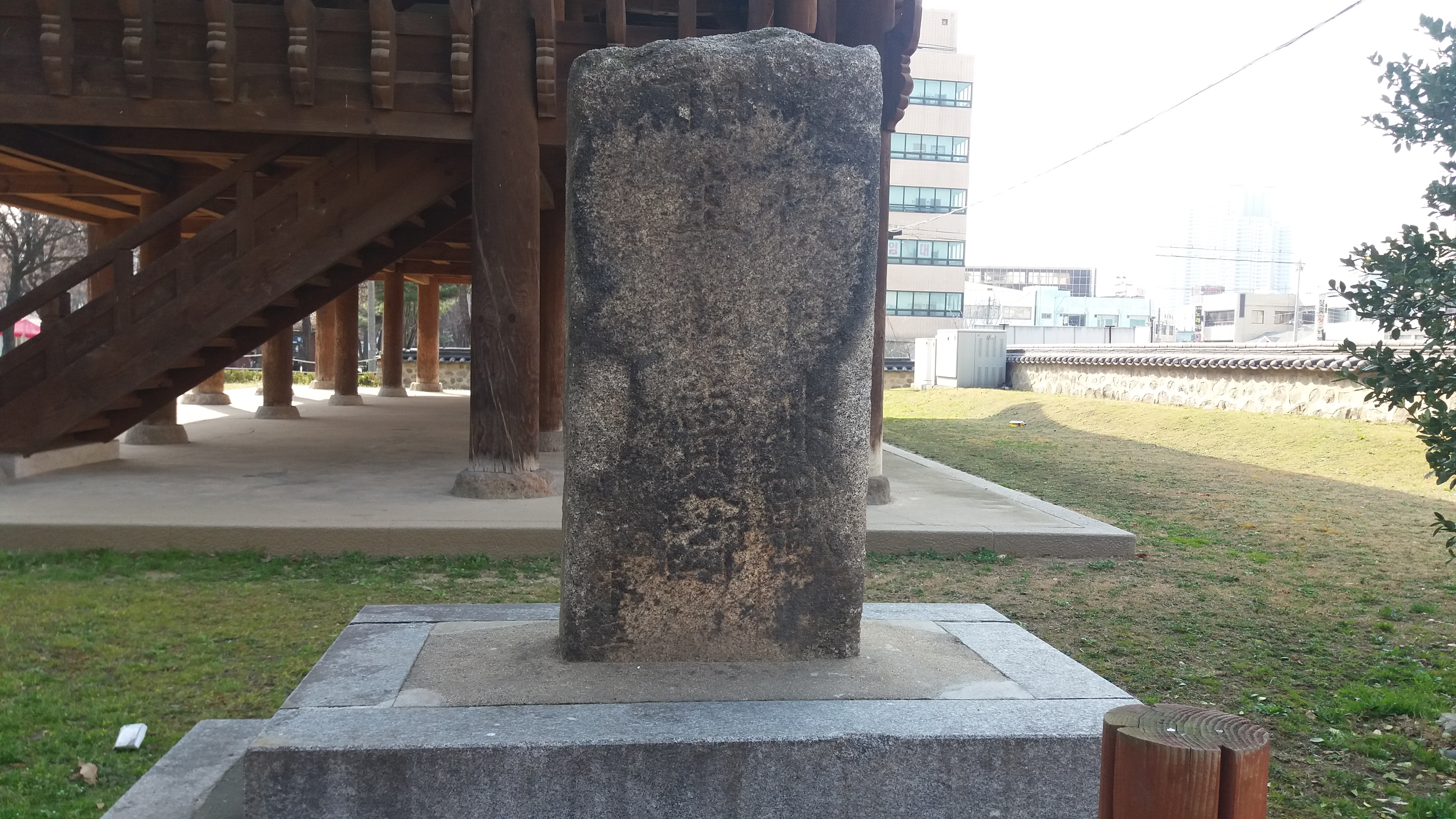
- Cheongju Anti-appeasement Stele

- Location within South Korea

General information
- Type: Stele
- Architectural style: Korean
- Location: Jongno District, Seoul, South Korea
- Coordinates: 37°34′43″N 126°58′38″E
- Current tenants: National Palace Museum of Korea; National Folk Museum
- Opened: 1871

Korean name
- Hangul: 척화비
- Hanja: 斥和碑
- RR: Cheokhwabi
- MR: Ch'ŏkhwabi

Anti-appeasement steles were 19th century monuments built in Korea to ostracize Westerners. They were erected by Heungseon Daewongun at more than 200 major transportation hubs across the country, including the four streets of Jongno. They were built in 1871 (the 8th year of reign by Emperor Gojong of the Joseon period). They were made of granite and were four cubits high, five cubits wide, and eight inches thick.

== History ==
Emperor Gojong ascended the throne in 1863 at the age of twelve, leading to his father, Yi Ha-eung, being appointed Daewongun and taking power. At this time, the United States and Russia were approaching the Korean Peninsula to engage in commerce and occasionally staged armed provocations and demonstrations.

Yi initially attempted to negotiate with France to counterbalance Russia during the early years of his tenure. However, his policy stance swiftly shifted towards isolationism after the outbreak of Byeonginyo in 1866 and an attempted robbery at the king's tomb. He established a policy that prohibited diplomatic relations and commerce with other countries, as to maintain control of the Joseon dynasty in 1871. To warn the people of this policy, stelae were set up by fire hydrants in April across the country.

In 1882, Japan invaded Korea and Yi Ha-eung was kidnapped by the Qing dynasty. Most of the stelae were demolished at the request of the Japanese government. In Seoul, one was buried near the Bosingak Pavilion in Jongno on 26 September 1882. The stele was rediscovered in June 1915 when the pavilion was relocated and displayed in a gallery west of Geunjeongjeon Hall in Gyeongbokgung Palace.

Stelae remain in about 30 locations.

== Content ==
The following words are written on the stele as an order:

洋夷侵犯 非戰則和 主和賣國

Then, in small letters, the next phrase is written on the side of the rain.

戒我萬年子孫 丙寅作 辛未立

This means, "If you don't fight for Western's invasion, you'll surrender, so if you insist on surrender, you'll sell your country. I warn all the people.. Build it in Byeongin-year and set it up in Sinmi-year."

== List of stele ==
Name	Picture	Installation (discovery) location	Current location	Scale	Cultural Heritage No.	Designated date
Gadeokdo Stele		Seongbuk-dong, Gangseo-gu, 56, Gadeokpo-gu	344 Chunga Elementary School in Seongbuk-dong, Gangseo-gu, Busan	128×145×16	Busan Metropolitan City designated Monument No. 35	01-Feb 1993
Ganghwa Stele			Deokjin Dondae of the Southern Dynasties	147×53×28		1867
Gyeongbokgung Palace Stele	150px	Gyeongbok Palace Geunjeongjeon, 4th Street in front of Bosingak Pavilion in Jongno	National Museum of Korea			
Gyeongju Stele	150px	Sansa-dong of Gyeongju	Gyeongju National Museum	Height 1.5m		
Gochang Stele			Hyangcheong, Gochang-eupseong, Gochang-gun			
Gumi Stele			Mt. 52–1 in Gupodong, Gumi City	175×186	North Gyeongsang Province Cultural Heritage Material No. 22	05-Aug 1985
Gunwi Stele			Gunwi-eup Dongbu-ri Gunwi-gun Office	115×43×14		
Gijang Stele	150px	inside of Daebyun-port breakwater		144×52.5×21	Busan Metropolitan City designated Monument No. 41	25-May 1996
Namhae Stele		Noryang Shipyard, Sulcheon Middle School	410-18 Noryang-ri, Seocheon-myeon, Namhae-gun	220×49×16	South Gyeongsang Province Cultural Heritage Material No. 266	31-Dec 1997
Daegu Stele			Gwandeokjeong Catholic Martyrs Memorial Hall in Daegu			
Miryang Stele			Milyang City Milyang			
Bonghwa Stele		Bongseong-ri, Bonghwa Middle School, Bongseong-myeon	Bonghwa Education Office in Naeseong-ri, Bonghwa-eup			
Busanjin Stele		Busan Jinsheng, Yongdu Mountain Park	948-1 Busan Museum in Daeyeon-dong, Nam-gu	143×44.7×23.8	Busan Metropolitan City designated Monument No. 18	26-June 1972
Sancheong Stele		Huanzheng Garden, Sancheng Elementary School	Sancheong-ri 290-1 Sancheong Elementary School in Sancheong-eup, Sancheong-gun	135×45×25.5	Gyeongnam-do Type Cultural Heritage No. 294	27-Dec 1993
Seongju Stele		Sungjoo Elementary School	Sungjoo Girls' High School			
Sunheung Stele		Sunheung-myeon of elementary school campus	314-3, Sunheung-myeon Office, Sunheung-myeon, Yeongju	114×46	Gyeongbuk Cultural Heritage Material No. 242	14-May 1991
Sinchang Stele		Shinchang Elementary School	297 Town-Narye-ri, Sinchang-si		Cultural Heritage Material No. 236 of Chungcheongnam-do	17-May 1984
Yangsan Stele			Sotori 667 Sonosowon, Sangbuk-myeon, Yangsan		Gyeongsangnam-do Type Cultural Heritage No. 120	02-May 1979
Yeosan Stele		Yeosan Elementary School	Iksan-myeon, Iksan-myeon, 445-2 Yeosan-dongheon	114×46×9	Iksan City Hyangtological Site No.7	30-May 2002
Yeongi Stele		Yeongihyang-bridge	34 Yeongi-ri, Yeongi-myeon, Sejong City		Sejong City Monument No.11	11-Feb 2016
Youngyang Stele			County seo-ri Nutrition County Office			
Yecheon Stele			Daeheung-myeon Office	Upper break		
Okcheon Stele			Mountain4-2 Samyangsa-gil, Okcheon-eup, Okcheon-gun	bullet marks	Monument No.6 of Chungcheongbuk-do	21-Dec 1976
Yonggung Stele		Yonggung Middle School, Yonggung Elementary School	Manparu of Eupbu-ri, Yonggung-myeon, Yecheon-gun		Gyeongbuk Cultural Heritage Material No.598	4-Oct 2012
Unhyeongoong Stele			Unhyeon Palace Museum of Antiquities			
Janggi Stele		inside of Janggi castle	Jangsu Myeon Office Garden in Nam-gu, Pohang	120×45×21	North Gyeongsang Province Cultural Heritage Material No. 224.	07-Aug 1990
Geoldoosan Stele	150px		Zeodu Mountain Martyrs' Site			
Changnyeong Stele		Changyeong-eup Gyohari	28-1 Manokjeong Park in Gyosang-ri, Changnyeong-eup	123×46×20	Cultural Heritage Material No. 218 of South Gyeongsang Province	02-May 1995
Cheongdo Stele		Cheongdo Roadside	15-10 Seosang-ri, Hwayang-eup, Cheongdo-gun	155×45×25	Gyeongbuk Cultural Heritage Material No.109	05-Aug 1985
Cheongsong Stele			Catholic Church in Cheongsong-eup, Cheongsong-gun	115×48×16		
Cheongju Stele	150px	Seokgyo-dong Sewage Station	92-13 Central Park, Nammun-ro 2-ga, Sangdang-gu, Cheongju	108×47	North Chungcheong Province Monument No. 23	27-Oct 1978
Pohang Stele		Road in front of Chilpo-ri Rock-Culture County, Pohang	Pohang City Heunghae Folk Museum			
Hamyang Stele			349-1 Sangrim Park in Unlim-ri, Hamyang-eup, Hamyang-gun	110×55×19	South Gyeongsang Province Cultural Heritage Material No. 264	31-Dec 1997
Hampyeong Stele		Kujuppo, Seokseong-ri, Hampyeong-eup	906-7 Hampyeong Park in Hapyeong-eup, Hampyeong-gun	135×52×20	Jeollanam-do Cultural Heritage Material No. 176.	24-Feb 1990
Hongseong Stele			Mount Obong-ri, Guhyang-myeon, Hongseong-gun	125×48×25.5	Cultural Heritage Material No. 163 of Chungcheongnam-do	17-May 1984

== See also ==
- ko:경고비
- Sakoku
