= Sunmok Budaebuin =

Korean noblewoman (1818–1898)

Grand Internal Princess Consort Sunmok
- Born: 9 March 1818; Yangdeokbang District, Hanseong, Joseon
- Died: 8 January 1898 (aged 79); Gongdeok-ri, Yongsanbang District, Hanseong, Joseon
- Burial: Heungseondaewonmyo (now Heungwon); Changhyeon-ri, Hwado-eub, Namyangju, Gyeonggi Province
- Spouse: Grand Internal Prince Heungseon (m. 1831)
- Issue Detail: Prince Imperial Heung; Gojong of Korea
Names
- Grand Internal Princess Consort Yeoheung (여흥부대부인; 驪興府大夫人; 1864–1898); Grand Internal Consort Sunmok (순목대원비; 純穆大院妃; 1898–1907); Grand Internal Princess Consort Imperial Sunmok (순목대원왕비; 純穆大院王后); Princess Consort Imperial Sunmok (순목왕비; 純穆王后)
- Clan: Yeoheung Min (by birth); Jeonju Yi (by marriage)
- Dynasty: Yi
- Father: Min Chi-gu
- Mother: Lady, of the Jeonju Yi clan
- Religion: Catholicism

Grand Internal Princess Consort Sunmok (Korean: 순목부대부인; Hanja: 純穆府大夫人; 9 March 1818 – 8 January 1898 (Note: In the Korean calendar (lunisolar), the Grand Princess was born on 3 February 1818 and died on 16 December 1897)), known before as Grand Internal Princess Consort Yeoheung (여흥부대부인; 驪興府大夫人), was a Korean noblewoman who became a Joseon dynasty royal family member through her marriage with Internal Prince Heungseon, and was the biological mother of Emperor Gojong of Korea.

When her son became Emperor, she was formally honored as Grand Primary Consort Sunmok (순목대원비; 純穆大院妃) in 1907 and therefore was called Grand Internal Queen Consort Sunmok (순목대원왕비; 純穆大院王后) or Queen Sunmok (순목왕비; 純穆王后). It is said that she was a Catholic believer, read the Ilgwamun (일과문; 日課文) and gave a thanksgiving mass at Unhyeongung. After Catholicism was allowed by the France–Korea Treaty of 1886, she was baptized in October 1896.

== Biography ==
=== Early life ===
Lady Min was born on 9 March 1818, during the 18th year reign of King Sunjo of Joseon, as the eldest daughter and child of Min Chi-Gu and his wife, Lady Yi of the Jeonju Yi clan. Lady Min is the 3rd great-granddaughter of Min Jin-yeong (Queen Inhyeon's younger half-brother). Her mother, Lady Yi was the aunt of Yi Ha-jeon, Prince Gyeongwon (Grand Internal Prince Deokheung's descendant).

In 1845, at 13-years-old, Min married Prince Namyeon's fourth son, Yi Ha-eung, who later became Grand Internal Prince Heungseon, in 1831. At first, Lady Min was given the rank of Shinin (Cautious Lady; 신인, 慎人) of Senior rank 3, and later Lady Shin (신부인; 慎夫人) with the same rank. When her husband was promoted to the rank of Prince and given the title Prince Heungseon (흥선군), Lady Min was given the title of Princess Consort (현부인) of Senior rank 2.

With him, she had her first daughter in 1838, and then a son, Prince Imperial Heungchin, on 22 August 1845. She later gave birth to the future King Gojong on 9 September 1852, a second daughter in 1854, and lastly a third daughter in 1863.

She was also distantly related to her mother-in-law, Princess Consort Min, who was the daughter of Min Gyeong-hyeok, a 3rd great-grandson of Min Jeong-jung, Queen Inhyeon's uncle. After Princess Consort Min's death, it is said that Prince Namyeon was supported with extreme sincerity by his daughter-in-law.

=== A new reign ===
In 1864, King Cheoljong died suddenly as the result of suspected foul play by the Andong Kim clan, an aristocratic and influential clan of the 19th century. Cheoljong was childless and had not appointed an heir. The Andong Kim clan had risen to power through intermarriage with the royal House of Yi. Queen Cheorin, Cheoljong's consort and a member of the Andong Kim clan, claimed the right to choose the next king, although traditionally the most senior Queen Dowager had the official authority to select the new king. Cheoljong's cousin, Grand Royal Queen Dowager Sinjeong, the widow of Heonjong of Joseon's father of the Pungyang Jo clan, who too had risen to prominence by intermarriage with the Yi family, currently held this title.

Queen Sinjeong saw an opportunity to advance the cause of the Pungyang Jo clan, the only true rival of the Andong Kim clan in Korean politics. As Cheoljong succumbed to his illness, the Grand Royal Dowager Queen was approached by Yi Ha-eung, a distant descendant of King Injo (r.1623–1649), whose father was made an adoptive son of Prince Eunsin, a nephew of King Yeongjo (r.1724–1776).

The branch that Yi Ha-eung's family belonged to was an obscure line of descendants of the Yi clan, which survived the often deadly political intrigue that frequently embroiled the Joseon court by forming no affiliation with any factions. Yi Ha-eung himself was ineligible for the throne due to a law that dictated that any possible heir had to be part of the generation after the most recent incumbent of the throne, but his second son Yi Myeongbok was a possible successor to the throne.

The Pungyang Jo clan saw that Yi Myeongbok was only 12 years old and would not be able to rule in his own name until he came of age, and that they could easily influence Yi Ha-eung, who would be acting as regent for his son. As soon as news of Cheoljong's death reached Yi Ha-eung through his intricate network of spies in the palace, he and the Pungyang Jo clan took the hereditary royal seal (considered necessary for a legitimate reign to take place and aristocratic recognition to be received), effectively giving Queen Sinjeong absolute power to select the successor to the throne. By the time Cheoljong's death became a known fact, the Andong Kim clan was powerless to act according to law because the seal already lay in the hands of Grand Royal Dowager Queen Shinjeong.

In the autumn of 1864, Yi Myeong-bok was crowned as King Gojong of Joseon, her husband given the title of Grand Internal Prince Heungseon (대원군; 大院君), and herself, Grand Internal Princess Consort Yeoheung.

=== Relation with Queen Min ===
Prior to her husband's regency and son's reign as king, a relative of her clan, Min Chi-rok had died in 1858. The Princess Consort's younger brother, Min Seung-ho, eventually became the adoptive son of Min Chi-rok in 1861 during King Cheoljong's 12th year of reign. Thus becoming the adoptive older brother of Min Chi-rok's only daughter, Min Ja-yeong.

When Gojong reached the age of 15, his father decided it was time for him to be married. The Grand Prince was diligent in his search for a queen who would serve his purposes: she must have no close relatives who would harbor political ambitions, yet come from a noble lineage so as to justify his choice to the court and the people. Candidates were rejected one by one, until she and her mother-in-law, Princess Consort Min, proposed a bride from their own clan, the Yeoheung Min. Min Ja-yeong came from the family line of Queen Inhyeon's eldest brother, Min Jin-hu.

The two women described the girl persuasively: she was orphaned and possessed beautiful features, a healthy body, and an ordinary level of education. But after the meeting, her husband had stated that he felt slightly disturbed by Min Ja-yeong's presence. Saying that she "...was a woman of great determination and poise", but paid no mind to it. Her husband allowed the marriage between the 16 year old Lady Min and their 15 year old son where the marriage ceremony formally happened on 26 March 1866. Thus becoming Queen Min who would eventually participate in Royal politics.

During the beginning of the marriage, her son's and husband's relationship deteriorated to the point her daughter-in-law started to receive death threats from her husband. The Yeoheung Min clan and its relatives were also not safe as they were targeted by the Grand Internal Prince.

After Min Seung-ho and his adoptive mother, Lady Yi, died from a political bombing assassination in 1874, Min Gyeom-ho became the second adoptive son of Min Chi-rok. Ten years later, the Princess Consort and Queen Min suffered family losses in the Gapsin Coup of 1884 due to the Heungseon Daewongun and his supporters.

Because of her daughter-in-law's interest and intervention in royal politics, relatives of their clan started being appointed to government and royal court positions. Which later prompted the resignation of her husband as regent and Queen Min as the successor when King Gojong took the throne and needed aid from his wife.

=== Imo Incident ===
When Heungseon Daewongun and Prince Yeongseon, her grandson, tried to get rid of Empress Myeongseong and her political power in the royal palace. She sent a person to her to inform them of their plans to save the life of the Empress. At the time of the Imo Incident and Donghak Peasant Movement, they sent a message to evacuate by informing her of some assassins' plans to enter. In June 1882, Grand Internal Prince Heungseon was re-established power by the old-fashioned army who revolted during the time of Imogunran (임오군란). Heo Ok (허욱), his assistant, dressed as a soldier and went to the palace during this time and played a role of pointing to Empress Myeongseong, but he couldn't find her. The Heungseon Daewongun ordered an attack on the administrative district of Seoul that housed the Gyeongbokgung, the diplomatic quarter, military centers, and science institutions. The soldiers attacked police stations to free comrades who had been arrested and then began ransacking private estates and mansions belonging to relatives of the Queen Consort. These units then stole rifles and began to kill Japanese training officers, and narrowly missed killing the Japanese ambassador to Seoul, who quickly escaped to Incheon.

The military rebellion then headed towards the palace but both Queen Consort and the King escaped ahead of time in disguise and fled to her relative's villa in Cheongju, where they remained in hiding. But it was also said that to escape without getting caught, the Empress Myeongseong disguised herself in advance by acting as Hong Gye-hoon's sister, and was carried on the back of Hong Gye-hun. She was able to escape the city and go to Yeoju to hide.

On 10 June, members of the old military became resentful of the special treatment of the new units and so they destroyed the house of her younger brother, Min Gyeom-ho, and killed him, who was the administrative head of the training units; Yi Choi-eung (Heungseon Daewongun's brother) and Kim Bo-hyun were also killed. These soldiers then fled to the protection of the Heungseon Daewongun, who publicly rebuked but privately encouraged them. The Heungseon Daewongun then took control of the old units.

It was also said that when Grand Internal Princess Consort Sunmok had entered the palace, she hid Empress Myseongseong, in what was probably a wooden litter she was riding on, but was seen by a court officer who then told the soldiers that were invading the palace. The Princess Consort then tried to persuade the Heungseon Daewongun to stop chasing after the queen which gave him suspicions. At that time, Royal guard Hong Jae-Hui (홍재희) (later renamed Hong Gye-Hun) said, That woman is my sister who is from the upper palace, you must not be mistaken. Min belatedly noticed this fact and the Heungseon Daewongun became violently resentful towards her after the ordeal, and kept her away from his affairs.

=== Later life ===
The Princess Consort later converted to Catholicism in 1896 where she was the given the baptismal name, Maria (마리아).

She later died on 8 January 1898 during her son's 2nd year of reign as Emperor. Her husband later followed on 22 February 1898.

Both are buried in Namyang, Gyeonggi Province. After her death, she was posthumously honoured as Queen Sunmok (순목왕비; 純穆王后) or Queen Sunmokdaewon (순목대원왕후; 純穆大院王后). In 1907, her husband was also honoured as King Heungseon Heonui Daewon (흥선헌의대원왕; 興宣獻懿大院王).

== Family ==
- Father
  - Min Chi-gu (민치구; 閔致久; 1795 – 14 December 1874)
- Mother
  - Lady Yi of the Jeonju Yi clan (정경부인 전주 이씨; 1797 – 17 November 1873)
- Siblings
  - Younger sister - Lady Min of the Yeoheung Min clan (여흥 민씨; 驪興 閔氏; 1820–1886)
  - Younger brother - Min Seung-ho (민승호; 閔升鎬; 1830–1874)
  - Younger brother - Min Tae-ho (민태호; 閔台鎬; 1828–1860)
  - Younger brother - Min Gyeom-ho (민겸호; 閔謙鎬; 1838 – 10 June 1882)
  - Younger sister - Lady Min of the Yeoheung Min clan (여흥 민씨; 驪興 閔氏; 1840 – ?)
- Husband
  - Yi Ha-Eung, Grand Internal Prince Heungseon (이하응 흥선대원군; 21 December 1820 – 22 February 1898)

Issue:

- Daughter - Lady Yi of the Jeonju Yi clan (이씨; 李氏; 1848–1869)
- Son - Yi Jae-myeon, Prince Imperial Heungchin (이재면 흥친왕; 22 August 1845 – 9 September 1912)
- Son - Yi Myeong-bok, Emperor Gojong of Korea (이희 대한제국 고종황제; 8 September 1852 – 21 January 1919)
- Lady Yi of the Jeonju Yi clan (이씨; 李氏; 1854–?)
- Daughter - Lady Yi of the Jeonju Yi clan (증 정경부인 전주 이씨; 1863–1899)

== In popular culture ==
- Portrayed by Uhm Yoo-Shin in the 1990 MBC TV series Daewongun.
- Portrayed by Kim Chang-Sook in the 1995 KBS TV series Dazzling Dawn.
- Portrayed by Lee Deok-Hee in the 2001–2002 KBS2 TV series Empress Myeongseong.

== See also ==
- Grand Internal Prince Heungseon
- Prince Imperial Heung
- Gojong of Korea
- Queen Wongyeong
- Queen Inhyeon
- Empress Myeongseong
