= Prince Imperial Heung =

Korean prince (1845–1912)

Yi Jae-myeon 이재면
- Prince Imperial Heung 흥친왕
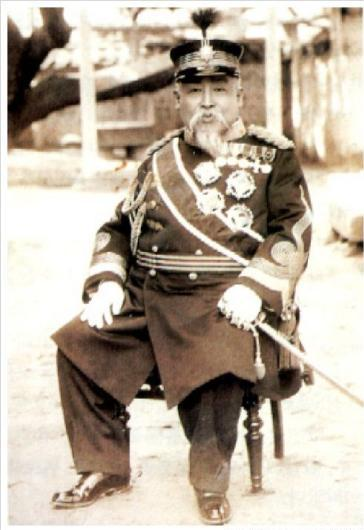
- Prince Imperial of Korean Empire

Prince Wanheung of Korea
- Reign: 1900–1910
- Predecessor: None
- Successor: None

Prince Imperial Heung of Korea
- Reign: 15 October 1910 – 29 August 1910
- Predecessor: None
- Successor: None

Duke Yi of Korea 1st generation of Yi Hui line
- Reign: 29 August 1910 – 1912
- Predecessor: None
- Successor: Yi Jun
- Born: 22 August 1845; Unhyeongung, Joseon
- Died: 9 September 1912 (aged 67); Unhyeongung, Korea, Empire of Japan
- Burial: Heungwon (흥원; 興園)
- Spouse: Lady Hong of Pungsan Hong clan Lady Lee of the Yeoju Lee clan
- Issue: Prince Yeongseon
- House: House of Yi
- Father: Grand Internal Prince Heungseon
- Mother: Grand Internal Princess Consort Sunmok of the Yeoheung Min clan
- Religion: Korean Confucianism (Neo-Confucianism)

Korean name
- Hangul: 이희
- Hanja: 李熹
- RR: I Hui
- MR: I Hŭi

Royal title
- Hangul: 흥친왕; 완흥군
- Hanja: 興親王; 完興君
- RR: Heungchinwang; Wanheunggun
- MR: Hŭngch'inwang; Wanhŭnggun

Former name
- Hangul: 이재면
- Hanja: 李載冕
- RR: I Jaemyeon
- MR: I Chaemyŏn

Prince Imperial Heung (Korean: 흥친왕; Hanja: 興親王, 22 August 1845 – 9 September 1912) was a prince of the Joseon dynasty and of the Korean Empire. He was the son of Heungseon Daewongun and the elder brother of Emperor Gojong of Korea. By birth, his original name was Yi Jae-myeon (이재면; 李載冕) and the art name was U-seok (우석; 又石); after he acquired the "Prince Imperial" title, his name was changed to Yi Hui (이희; 李熹) on 25 August 1910. Five days later, the Japan–Korea Treaty of 1910 became effective, Yi Hui lost the imperial title and received a title "Duke Yi Hui" (이희공; 李熹公) instead.

== Biography ==
Prince Imperial Heung was born in 1845, as the son of Prince Heungseon, who was a member of the ruling family but had no authority.

In 1864, he passed the literary examination of the Gwageo. He was an official under his father's regency. He visited his father when he was locked in China. After his younger brother got the power, and Kim Hong-jip was appointed as the chancellor, Yi was appointed as Minister of Gungnaebu.

In May 1900, Yi became Prince Wanhung. He got Order of the Plum Blossom and Order of the Auspicious Stars in 1907, after the abdication of Gojong and coronation of Sunjong of Korea. In November 1907, Yi was appointed as Lieutenant General. He was later sent to Japan as a diplomat and got 1st class of Order of the Paulownia Flowers. In 1909, Yi got Order of the Golden Ruler. He helped the annexation of Korea from June 1910. On 15 August 1910, Yi became Prince Imperial Heung. He signed the Japan–Korea Treaty of 1910, which annexed Korea. He was ennobled as Duke Yi Hui after the annexation. He got 830,000 Won for the annexation of Korea and decoration for the annexation of Korea. His title was inherited to Yi Jun-yong.

== Family ==
- Father: Yi Ha-Eung, Grand Internal Prince Heungseon (이하응 흥선대원군; 21 December 1820 – 22 February 1898)
  - Grandfather: Yi Gu, Prince Namyeon (이구 남연군; 22 August 1788 – 19 March 1836)
  - Grandmother: Princess Consort Min of the Yeoheung Min clan (군부인 여흥민씨; 26 June 1788 – 1831)
- Mother: Grand Internal Princess Consort Sunmok of the Yeoheung Min clan (순목대원비 민씨; 3 February 1818 – 8 January 1898)
  - Grandfather: Min Chi-Gu (민치구; 1795 – 14 December 1874)
  - Grandmother: Lady Yi of the Jeonju Yi clan (전주 이씨; 1797 – 17 November 1873)
- Sibling(s)
  - Younger sister: Lady Yi of the Jeonju Yi clan (이씨; 李氏; 1848–1869)
    - Brother-in-law: Jo Gyeong-ho (조경호; 趙慶鎬) of the Imcheon Jo clan (1839–1914)
  - Younger brother: King Gojong (고종; 8 September 1852 – 21 January 1919)
    - Sister-in-law: Empress Myeongseong of the Yeoheung Min clan (명성태황후 민씨; 17 November 1851 – 8 October 1895)
      - Nephew: Emperor Sunjong (순종 효황제; 25 March 1874 – 25 April 1926)
  - Younger sister: Lady Yi of the Jeonju Yi clan (이씨; 李氏; 1854–?)
    - Brother-in-law: Yi Yun-yong (이윤용; 李允用) of the Ubong Yi clan (1855 – 8 September 1939) (Note: He was the adoptive older brother to Yi Wan-yong, who is known for signing Korea's annexation to Japan)
  - Younger sister: Lady Yi of the Jeonju Yi clan (이씨; 李氏; 1863–1899)
    - Brother-in-law: Jo Jeong-gu (조정구; 趙鼎九) of the Pungyang Jo clan (1862–1926)
- Consorts and their Respective Issue(s):
1. Lady Hong of the Pungsan Hong clan (풍산 홍씨; 8 April 1844 – 19 December 1887)
  1. Yi Jun-Yong, Prince Yeongseon (이준용 영선군; 23 July 1870 – 22 March 1917)
  2. Lady Yi of the Jeonju Yi clan (1874–?)
  3. Lady Yi of the Jeonju Yi clan (1875 – 21 August 1924)
  4. Yi Mun-Yong (이문용; 4 September 1882 – 8 October 1901)
2. Princess Imperial Heung of the Yeoju Lee clan (흥친왕비 여주 이씨; 驪州 李氏; 7 June 1883 – 8 January 1978)
  1. Lady Yi of the Jeonju Yi clan (1900–?)
3. Lady Joo of the Sinan Joo clan (신안 주씨)

== Ancestry ==
Ancestors of Prince Imperial Heung

Yi Chin-ik
Yi Byeong-won
Yi Gu, Prince Namyeon
Heungseon Daewongun
Min Gyeong-hyeok
Princess Consort Min
Yi Jae-myon, Prince Imperial Heung
Min Baek-sul
Min Dan-hyon
Min Chi-gu
Lee Ok of Deokheung
Lady Yi, Princess of Deokheung
Grand Internal Princess Consort Sunmok of the Yeoheung Min clan
Lady Yi of the Jeonju Yi clan

== Popular culture ==
- Portrayed by Han Beom-hee in the 2001–2002 KBS2 TV series Empress Myeongseong.

== See also ==
- History of Korea
- Rulers of Korea
- Empress Myeongseong
- Yi Jun-yong
- Heungseon Daewongun
- Hague Secret Emissary Affair
- Emperor Gojong
- Emperor Sunjong
