= Heungseon Daewongun =

Regent of Joseon from 1864 to 1873

Yi Ha-eung 이하응
- Grand Internal Prince Heungseon
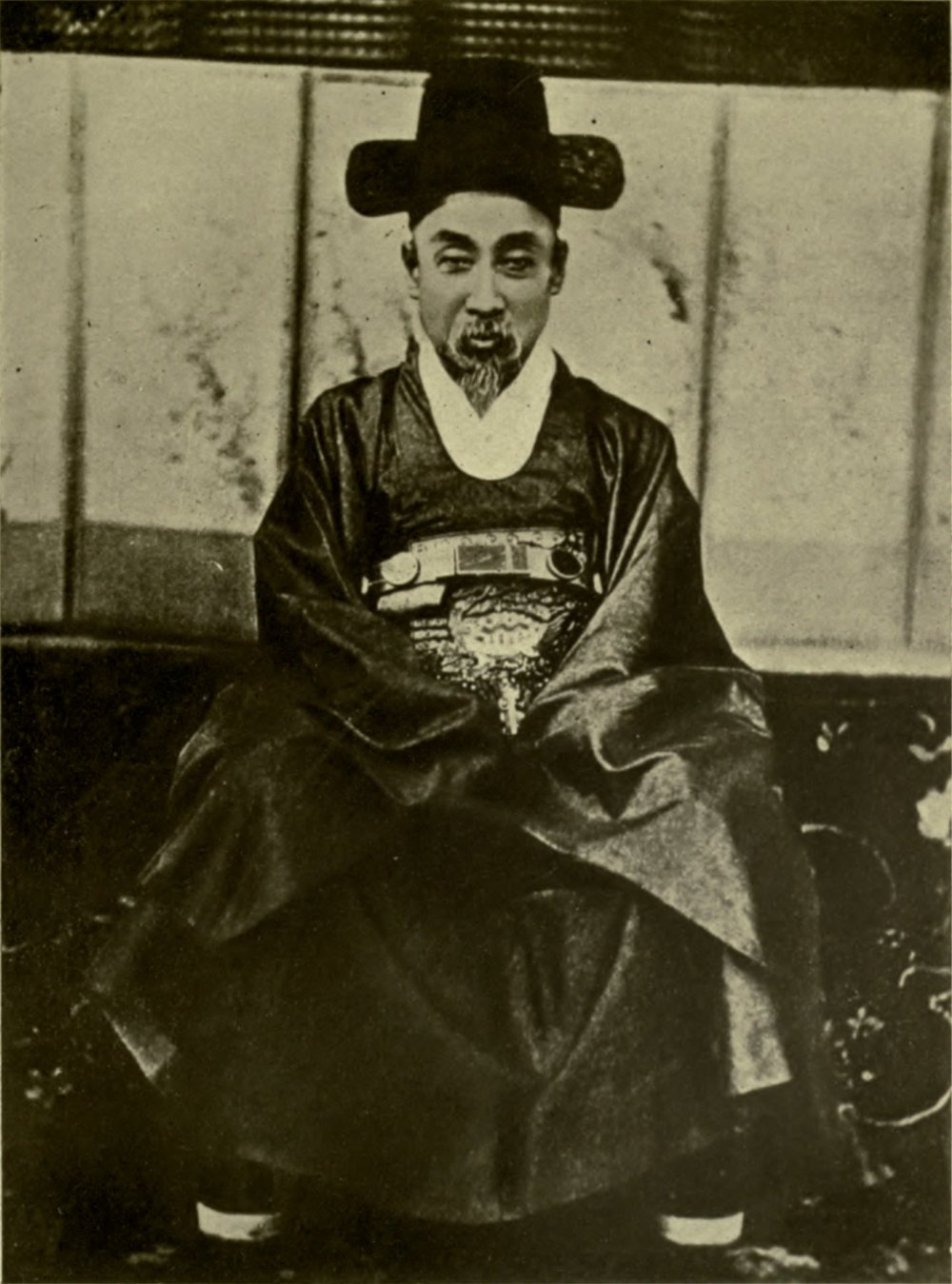
- Photograph by Homer Hulbert

Regent of Joseon
- Tenure: 21 January 1864 – 31 October 1873 (with Queen Sinjeong)
- Monarch: Gojong
- Born: 24 January 1821; Hanseong, Joseon
- Died: 22 February 1898 (aged 77); Seongjeosibli, Korean Empire
- Spouse: Grand Internal Princess Consort Sunmok
- Issue: Prince Imperial Heungchin; Emperor Gojong of Korea; Prince Imperial Waneun (illegitimate)
- Dynasty: House of Yi
- Father: Yi Gu, Prince Namyeon
- Mother: Princess Consort Min

Korean name
- Hangul: 이하응
- Hanja: 李昰應
- RR: I Haeung
- MR: I Haŭng

Royal title
- Hangul: 흥선대원군
- Hanja: 興宣大院君
- RR: Heungseon daewongun
- MR: Hŭngsŏn taewŏn'gun

Art name
- Hangul: 석파
- Hanja: 石坡
- RR: Seokpa
- MR: Sŏkp'a

Courtesy name
- Hangul: 시백
- Hanja: 時伯
- RR: Sibaek
- MR: Sibaek

Heungseon Daewongun (Korean: 흥선대원군; Hanja: 興宣大院君; 24 January 1821 – 22 February 1898) was the title of Yi Ha-eung, the regent of Joseon during the minority of Emperor Gojong in the 1860s. Until his death, he was a key political figure of late Joseon Korea. He was known simply as the Daewongun (대원군; 大院君; lit. ''Grand Prince Regent''; though referred as 'Grand Internal Prince', due to his regency, Grand Prince Regent is more appropriate), Guktaegong (국태공; 國太公; lit. ''The Great Archduke''), or later Grand Internal Prince Imperial Heonui (헌의대원왕; 獻懿大院王); he was also known to contemporary western diplomats as Prince Gung.

Daewongun literally translates as "grand prince of the court", a title customarily granted to the father of the reigning monarch when that father did not reign himself (usually because his son had been adopted as heir of a relative who did reign). While there had been three other daewonguns during the Joseon period, none were as dominant as Yi Ha-eung, so the term usually refers specifically to him.

Joseon was going through changes in many aspects during this period, but was for the most part unable to keep up with the rapidly changing situation the country found itself in. Yi Ha-eung had to solve both the looming threat posed by Western nations, which were continuously encroaching upon the sovereignty of Eastern states, while at the same time attempt to rebuild a country ravaged by poverty and internal power struggles. He is remembered both for the wide-ranging reforms he attempted during his regency, as well as for what was described by historian Hilary Conroy as "vigorous enforcement of the seclusion policy, persecution of Christians, and the killing or driving off of foreigners who landed on Korean soil".

== Biography ==
=== Early life ===
The Daewongun was born Yi Ha-eung on 24 January 1821. He was the fourth son of Yi Chae-jung, a member of the royal family who in 1816 was given the name Yi Gu and the title Prince Namyeon. The Daewongun was a 9th generation descendant of King Injo through Grand Prince Inpyeong.

The Daewongun was well-schooled in Confucianism and the Chinese classics. He reputedly excelled in calligraphy and painting. His early government career consisted of minor posts that were mostly honorary and ceremonial. For most of his early life, his connection to the royal house seemed of little help to him. He was poor and humiliated by the rich in-laws of the royal house. Since the Andong Kim clan had a lot of authority and influence over the country, he was barred from obtaining high positions in politics even though he was a member of the royal family, the Jeonju Yi clan. Instead, he drew orchids and sold them to Korean noblemen to earn money.

=== Rise to power ===
The Daewongun came to power when his second son, Yi Myeong-bok, was chosen to become king.

In January 1864, King Cheoljong (1831–1864) died without an heir. The selection of the next king was in the hands of three dowagers: Queen Sinjeong, mother of King Heonjong (1827–1849); Queen Myeongheon, King Heonjong's wife; and Queen Cheorin, Cheoljong's wife. The "designation right" resided with Dowager Queen Sinjeong, as she was the oldest of the dowagers.

In an apocryphal story, Queen Cheorin sent a minister to fetch the son of Yi Ha-eung, eleven-year-old Yi Myeong-bok, who was flying a kite in a palace garden. The boy was brought to the palace in a sedan chair, where Queen Sinjeong rushed forward and called him her son. This designated him as the adopted son of Sinjeong's late husband, Crown Prince Hyomyeong (1809–1830), the father of King Heonjong. This story may or may not have been true.

These facts, however, are known to be correct. On 16 January 1864, Yi Myeong-bok was appointed the Prince of Ikseong by Dowager Queen Sinjeong. The next day, his father was granted the title Daewongun, equivalent to the title of "regent" in Korean, the difference being that the title was only given to the biological father of the young king. On 21 January, Yi Myeong-bok was enthroned as King Gojong, and Dowager Queen Sinjeong began her regency. Yi was apparently chosen because "he was the only suitable surviving male member of the Yi clan and closest by blood to the royal house".

Since Gojong was so young, Queen Sinjeong invited the Daewongun to assist his son in ruling the country. She virtually renounced her right to be regent, and though she remained the titular regent, the Daewongun acted as the de facto ruler of the country, exercising the powers of the regency in the name of the Queen.

Once Gojong became king, there still remained the question of the king's marriage. Gojong's mother Yeoheung decided upon a daughter of the Min clan, Lady Min. The Daewongun remarked that Min "was a woman of great determination and poise" and was slightly disturbed by her. However, he allowed her to marry his son, and unknowingly created his greatest political rival.

=== Reforms ===
Grand Internal Prince Heungseon as Regent

During his regency, the Daewongun attempted several reforms. His main goal was to "crush the old ruling faction that had virtually usurped the sovereign power of the kings earlier in the century".

When he took power in 1864, the Daewongun was determined to reform the government and strengthen central control. He led an anti-corruption campaign, disciplined the royal clans, and taxed the aristocracy, the yangban. Cumings notes that this was not a revolution but a restoration, as the Daewongun was attempting to return to the days of King Sejong in the fifteenth century.

One of the Daewongun's effective acts as regent was the reconstruction of Gyeongbok Palace. The palace had been built during the reign of the first Joseon king. Much of the building was destroyed in a fire in 1533 and the rest was destroyed during the Japanese invasion of 1592. The rebuilding took seven years and five months. It was perhaps the most costly project during the Joseon dynasty. He also weakened the power of the Andong Kim clan and increased the authority of the ruling family. This act stripped almost all of the Andong Kim clan's power.

The Daewongun's reforms were not very successful, as some scholars say he was "too high-handed and tactless". Furthermore, his policies did not have a long-lasting effect. Once Gojong came of age in 1874, he forced the Daewongun into semi-retirement and undid many of his reforms.

=== Foreign policy ===
The Daewongun's foreign policy was rather simple, as Cumings describes it: "no treaties, no trade, no Catholics, no West, and no Japan". He maintained an isolationist policy.

The Isolation Policy was a policy made to isolate Joseon from all foreign forces except for China which he believed to be the strongest. He tried to refuse Russia's quest to open Joseon's ports to them by using France, but France refused to help – causing the 1866 Byeong-in Persecution. He was involved in the General Sherman incident as well. The Isolation Policy became more entrenched in 1868 when German merchant Ernst Oppert attempted to take hostage the bones of the Daewongun's father in order to force him to open Korea to trade; and even further so after the 1871 American attack on Gwanghwado.

The Isolation Policy provided immediate benefits of fortifying Korean patriotism as well as protecting Korean Confucianism. The Heungseon Daewongun was able to protect Joseon from cultural imperialism and westernization and thus protect Korea's heritage from it. However, because he refused entirely to engage in international relations, there was a limited choice of market and slim opportunity for an Industrial Revolution to occur in Korea. Indeed, the Daewongun wanted to avoid engagement with the West – which would have been inevitable if Western countries were allowed to trade freely – as it would erode government influence. The Joseon Dynasty had a strict social hierarchy: the wealth of the yangban nobility rested on the backs of sangmin farm labourers and tenants. The Daewongun wanted to prevent the collapse of this hierarchy. Despite his fame for his fairness and support of civilization, the emancipation of the sangmin would mean the destruction of the yangban, his own social class.

The international relations of Joseon worsened as the Daewongun adopted increasingly desperate and harsher measures in order to repel Westernization. The Daewongun made the choice of protecting the world he knew by trying to shut out foreigners, at the cost of delaying development and modernization, and to keep Korea a hermit kingdom. Many Koreans state that had he chosen to engage with foreign countries as his daughter-in-law Queen Min advocated, the Japanese rule of Korea could have been avoided. However, others state that the ten years of the Isolation Policy was too small a part of the Joseon Dynasty to derive such a statement from.

=== Retirement ===
In 1874, King Gojong came of age. His wife, Queen Min, influenced his decision to "assume the full measure of royal responsibility", an action that forced the Daewongun into semi-retirement.

=== Loss of eldest son 1881 ===
Daewongun's eldest son, Yi Jae-seon (posthumously known as Prince Imperial Waneun), was with a concubine. Due to an 1881 isolationist conservative plot to overthrow Gojong and install Yi Jae-seon as king but with Daewongun as the effective power behind the throne, this son was executed in October 1881. The plotters were associates of Daewongun but his involvement is not proved.

=== Return to power ===
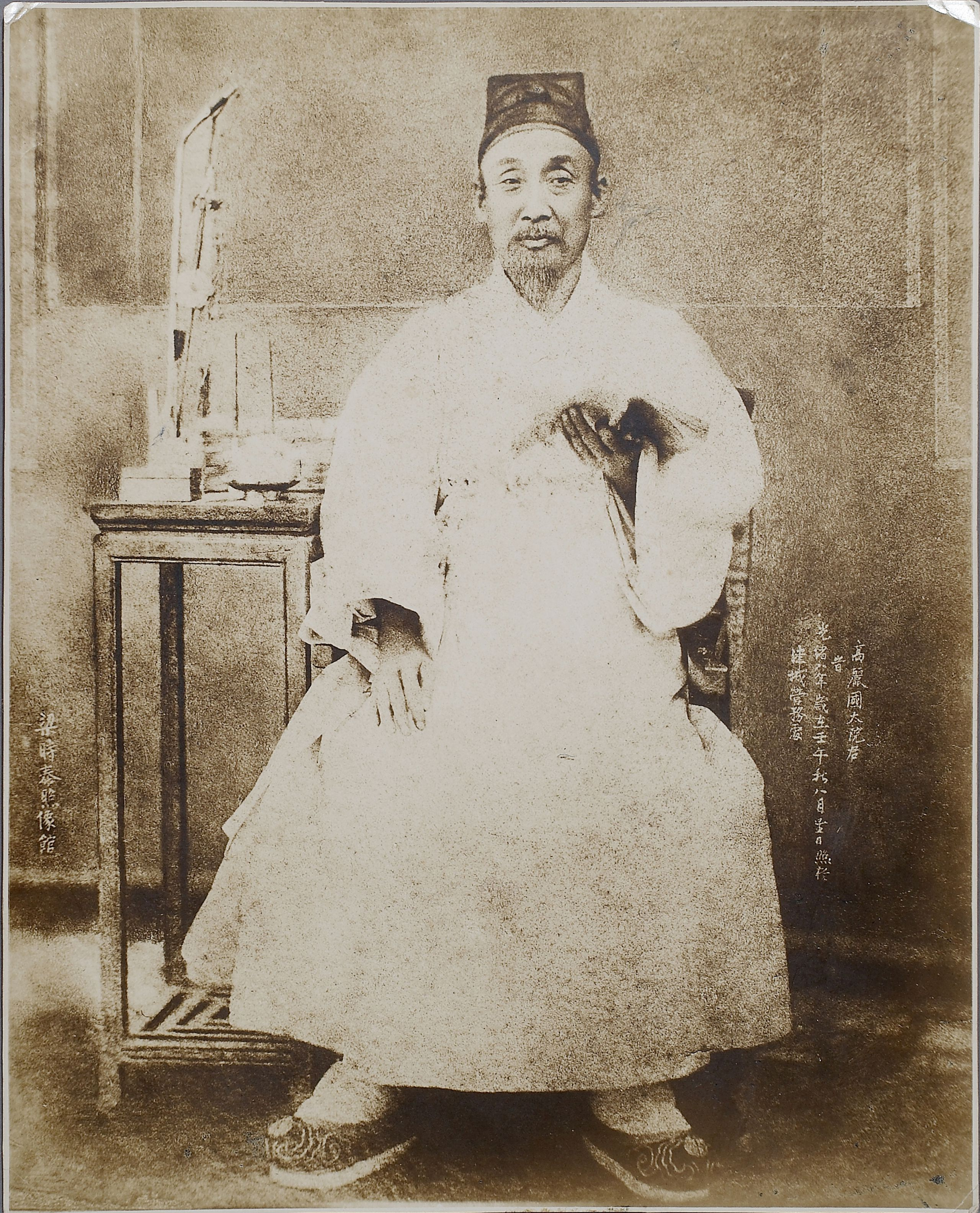
Daewongun in 1883

The Daewongun enjoyed a brief return to power during the Imo Incident in 1882. On the second day of the mutiny, a group of rioters were received by the Daewongun, "who reportedly exhorted them to bring down the Min regime and expel the Japanese". King Gojong asked his father, the Daewongun to come to the palace. The Daewongun's appearance, escorted by 200 mutineers, "put an immediate end to the wild melee." Gojong gave the Daewongun "all the small and large matters of the government" and thus the Daewongun resumed his rule. Both Japanese and Chinese forces headed towards Korea to put down the rebellion, and Ma Chien-chung, a Chinese diplomat in Korea, decided that it was time to remove the Daewongun.

The Chinese had three reasons they wanted to remove the Daewongun: First, he attempted to overthrow the pro-Chinese Min faction. Second, "he created a situation which invited the Japanese troops to Korea, thus precipitating the danger of a military conflict between Japan on the one hand and Korea and China on the other." And third, "the Taewongun [Daewongun]-inspired disturbance threatened the foundation of a lawfully constituted government in a dependent nation".

Ma arrested the Daewongun on the charge of disrespect to the emperor for "usurping the power which the emperor had invested in the king of Korea". However, as he was the father of the king, he was dealt with leniently. One hundred Chinese soldiers escorted the Daewongun to a waiting Chinese warship, and from there to Tianjin.

=== Return to Korea ===
In the fall of 1885, the Chinese returned the Daewongun to Korea, "despite strong objections from the queen and her followers". After the return, he was unhappy when Queen Min signed the Russia–Korea Treaty of 1884. Daewongun tried to regain power again by aiding his grandson Yi Jun-yong in an attempt to overthrow his uncle King Gojong.

=== Gabo Reform ===
In 1894, the Japanese were strengthening their hold over Korea. They needed someone amenable to them to be a leader in Korea during the Gabo Reform. They approached the Daewongun as a potential leader. When he agreed, on 23 July Japanese soldiers liberated him from the house arrest Gojong had placed him under. In exchange for his help, the Daewongun asked for a promise that if the reforms succeeded, "Japan will not demand a single piece of Korean territory". The soldiers took him to the palace, where they approached the king. The Daewongun reproached King Gojong and announced that he would be taking over.

The Japanese became nervous after placing the Daewongun in charge, as he seemed interested "only in grasping power and purging his opponents and did not see the need for a reform policy". By September 1894, the Japanese decided that the Daewongun was not to be trusted. By early October, it became clear that "the plan to use the Taewongun [Daewongun] as a vehicle for the reform program had misfired". A Japanese statesman, Inoue Kaoru, was sent to Korea as the new resident minister, where he told the Daewongun, "You always stand in the way," and forced the Daewongun to promise that he would "abstain from interference in political affairs".

=== Involvement in Queen Min's assassination ===
In 1895, Japanese officials in Korea were plotting the removal of Gojong's wife, Queen Min. Miura Gorō, Inoue Kaoru's successor as Japanese advisor to the Korean government, and Sugimura Fukashi, a secretary of the Japanese legation, planned the attempt. The two decided to involve the Daewongun in the plot, and after making inquiries, learned that he was "indignant enough to plan a coup" and would cooperate with them. On 8 October 1895, early in the morning, Japanese policemen escorted the Daewongun to the palace. His involvement from that point on is unclear, but on that morning, Japanese agents assassinated Queen Min.

=== Death ===
The Daewongun died in 1898, just a little over a year after the formation of the Korean Empire. On 24 August 1907 Emperor Sunjong bestowed him the posthumous title Internal King Heungseon Heonui. (Note: 흥선헌의대원왕; 興宣獻懿大院王)

== Family ==
- Father: Yi Gu, Prince Namyeon (이구 남연군; 22 August 1788 – 19 March 1836)
- Mother: Princess Consort Min of the Yeoheung Min clan (군부인 여흥민씨; 26 June 1788 – 1831)
- Consorts and their Respective Issue(s):
1. Grand Internal Princess Consort Sunmok of the Yeoheung Min clan (순목대원비 민씨; 3 February 1818 – 8 January 1898)
  1. Lady Yi (이씨; 1838–1869)
  2. Yi Jae-myeon, Prince Imperial Heungchin (이재면 흥친왕; 22 August 1845 – 9 September 1912)
  3. Emperor Gojong of Korea (대한제국 고종; 8 September 1852 – 21 January 1919)
  4. Lady Yi (이씨; 1861–1899)
2. Gye Seong-wol (계성월)
  1. Yi Jae-seon, Prince Waneun (이재선 완은군; 1 August 1842 – 27 October 1881)
  2. Lady Yi (이씨; 1855–1869)
3. Kisaeng Chuseon (기녀 추선; ?–1885)
4. Lady Seo (서씨; ? – 7 January 1914)
5. Jin Chae-seon (진채선; 1842–?)

== In popular culture ==
- Portrayed by Yoo Dong-geun in the 2001–2002 KBS2 TV series Empress Myeongseong.
- Portrayed by Chun Ho-jin in the 2009 film The Sword with No Name.
- Portrayed by Lee Beom-soo in the 2012 MBC TV series, Dr. Jin.
- Portrayed by Kim Nam-gil in the 2015 film The Sound of a Flower.
- Portrayed by Choi Jong-won in the 2018 tvN and Netflix TV series Mr. Sunshine.
- Portrayed by Ji Sung in the 2018 film Fengshui.
- Portrayed by Jun Kwang-ryul in the 2020 TV Chosun TV series Kingmaker: The Change of Destiny.

== See also ==
- History of Korea
- Prince Imperial Waneun
- List of monarchs of Korea
- Anti-appeasement steles

== Footnotes ==
1.In chronological order: Seonjo's Father (Deokheung Daewongun), his son (Jeongwon Daewongun; Injo's Father), and Cheoljong's Father (Jeongye Daewongun). Gojong's Father is the fourth and last
2.He is an illegitimate son.
