= Lee Jin-woo (actor) =

South Korean actor (born 1969)

- Born: January 25, 1969 (age 57); Paju, Gyeonggi-do, South Korea
- Occupations: Actor; pastor
- Agent: Ares Entertainment
- Spouse: Lee Eung-kyung (m. 2005)

Korean name
- Hangul: 이진우
- Hanja: 李珍雨
- RR: I Jinu
- MR: I Chinu

Lee Jin-woo (Korean: 이진우; born January 25, 1969) is a South Korean actor.

== Filmography ==
=== Film ===
Year	Title	Role
1987	Saturdays with No Nights	
1990	North Korean Partisan in South Korea	
1990	The Dream	
1993	The Cast Off Chains	
1995	Go Alone Like Musso's Horn	Sun-woo
1997	D-Day	
1997	Repechage	Jin-woo
1997	Bad Movie	
1998	The Bait	
1999	Piracy	
2001	Paradise Villa	Room 2003

=== Television series ===
Year	Title	Role	Network
1994	The Moon of Seoul	Cha Hyung-Guen	MBC
1995	Men of the Bath House	Kim Dong-hwan	KBS2
1996	Jo Gwang-jo	King Jungjong	KBS2
1997	Women	Jung Man	SBS
1998	The King and the Queen	King Seongjong	KBS1
2000	Say It with Your Eyes	Product planning representative	MBC
2001	I Still Love You	Jung Goo-kyoung	SBS
2001	Delicious Proposal	Shim Woo-kyung	MBC
2001	Empress Myeongseong	King Gojong	KBS2
2002	Saxophone and Chapssaltteok	Lee Soo-nam	KBS2
2003	Forever Love	Kim Jae-guk	MBC
2004	Count of Myeongdong	Kim Soo-young	EBS
2004	Proposal	Shim Woo-kyung	SBS
2005	Pharmacist Kim's Daughters	Kang Geuk	MBC
2005	5th Republic	Hur Hwa-pyong	MBC
2005	Shin Don	Lee Seong-gye	MBC
2007	Hometown Over the Hill	Na Jin-suk	KBS1
2008	The Great King, Sejong	Jeong In-ji	KBS1
2009	Empress Cheonchu	Han Derang	KBS2
2012	Dream of the Emperor	King Uija	KBS1
2014	KBS TV Novel – "Single-minded Dandelion"	Jin Sun-jae	KBS2

== Awards and nominations ==
Year	Award	Category	Nominated work	Result
2007	KBS Drama Awards	Excellence Award, Actor in a Serial Drama	Hometown Over the Hill	Nominated
