= Tokai Sanshi =

Political activist and novelist (1852-1922)

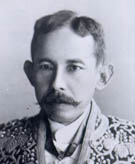
Tokai Sanshi

Shiba Shirō (柴四郎), better known for his pen name Tōkai Sanshi (東海散士, Wanderer of the Eastern Sea), (21 June 1852 – 13 December 1922) was a political activist and novelist during the Meiji period. He was born into a samurai family and fought for domain of Aizu during the Boshin War from 1868 to 1869, after which the Aizu domain was abandoned. He was educated at different facilities in Japan and in the United States, and he served in the military during the First Sino-Japanese War and Russo-Japanese War. His major works include Strange Encounters with Beautiful Women (Kajin no Kigū), first serialized in 1885 and concluded in 1897.

== Biography ==
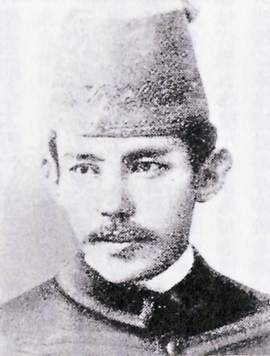
Shiba Shiro with fez hat, December 1886, Constantinople

Shiba was a Japanese political novelist and journalist. He is best known for writing Strange Encounters with Beautiful Women, which revolves around a Japanese man from Aizu who goes by the quasi-Chinese pseudonym of Tōkai Sanshi, a Chinese man, a Spanish woman named Yolanda and an Irish woman named Colleen.

Born as the 4th son of Aizu samurai Shiba Satazō, Shiba Shirō was fourteen years old when the Aizu domain was attacked by the imperial forces during the civil war prior to the Meiji Restoration in 1868. As a youth, Shiba fought for the failing Tokugawa shogunate. During the siege of Aizu castle, his grandmother, mother, and two sisters committed suicide so that the men in the family could do battle without distractions. Aizu castle fell to the forces of the new Meiji government and the domain surrendered. After a period spent in captivity, Shiba studied at Toogijuku, a private academy in Hirosaki that trained talented young man for government service and attracted many former samurai from the northeastern domain.

From 1879 to 1885, Shiba Shirō received funds from the Iwasaki family to pursue further education in the United States. He remained in America for seven years, first attending Pacific Business College in San Francisco, and then went to Boston, where he briefly studied at Harvard. Finally, he went to Philadelphia and studied at the University of Pennsylvania from 1881 to 1885, obtaining a Bachelor of Finance from the Wharton School.

In 1885, shortly after his return from the United States, Shiba published the first two volumes of Kajin no kigū. When the Satsuma Rebellion broke out in 1877, he was recruited by the Meiji government forces as a temporary officer.

Shiba's time was increasingly taken up by government work and in subsequent years by the writing of Kajin no kigū, which was published serially in eight parts between 1885 and 1897 political activities. The book was so enthusiastically received that it not only became the most popular political novel in the Meiji era, it also continued to inspire readers decades after it was written.

In 1891, Shiba won a seat in the new national legislative assembly, to which he was reelected eight times.

== Ideology ==
Shiba Shirō was a political novelist whose stance can be considered as nationalist (kokusuishugi, 国粋主義). His having grown up in a samurai family and experienced his domain's destruction was an essential to the formation of Shiba Shirō's political ideology.

An "enlightened" aspect of Tokai Sanshi's view lies in his understanding of power relations in the world and his refutation of hierarchy often hypothesized between "civilized" or hegemonic nations (Britain, France, and Russia) and the “undercivilized” (nations whose independence was threatened if not terminated by the imperialist nations).

Because he witnessed his father Shiba Satazo's loyalty to Tokugawu shogunate, Shiba Shirō advocated the preservation of Japanese traditions and domestic economics. He supported the establishment of Tobokyokai (東邦協会), an organization that attracted people who advocate Nanshin-ron (南進論), Pan-Asianism, and economic independence in 1891, and took up responsibilities in Rikkenkakushinto (立憲革新党) in 1984. Both of them were active organizations in supporting a more rigid foreign policy against the westernization of Japan.

In his novel Toyo no Bijin (東洋之佳人, 1888), Shiba Shirō tells the story of a beautiful Japanese girl who falls in love with a Western playboy who seduces her with beautiful clothes and exquisite cuisine. The girl is not able to resist the temptation and gives herself to the Western man but eventually contracts syphilis and loses her beauty. The beautiful girl is an allegorical representation of Japan and Western countries are symbolized by the playboy.and the story conveys the idea that westernization is not the solution but a crisis for Meiji Japan. This concept also appears in his most well-known work Kajin no Kigū.

But his view is also formed on the basis of his western education and military services. With his awareness of the complexity of the world, he does not advocate a Japanese uniqueness, nor does he simplify the foreign as one distinct entity. He sympathize with the challenged nations such as Ireland and Hungary but resist the hegemony of imperialist nations.

== Strange Encounters with Beautiful Women (『佳人之奇遇』) ==
Strange Encounters with Beautiful Women (Kajin no Kigū,『佳人之奇遇』) is Tokai Sanshi's most famous work, serialized between 1885 and 1897 it became one of Japan's most popular political novels (seijishousetsu,政治小説). At the start of the Meiji Era, when an unprecedented tide of Western influence was pouring into Japan many Japanese advocated for political and social change:

Meiji culture saw that collision of the ancient Confucian tradition with the West's spirit of innovation. Oppressed by the old-time political organization, many of the thinking people of Meiji yearned for objectives which perhaps they could not fully comprehend, but which they knew of and wanted because they linked them with the new and wonderful West—independence, freedom, equal rights. And it was in Western society, politics, literature, and fine arts that they saw the concrete appearance of their ideals. Therefore, the first literary movement which we see in Meiji, the precursor to the succeeding political and then the scientific and social novels, is that of the translation of English and French works...But perhaps most important for the purposes of this article was the translation of political novels such as Coninsby by Benjamin Disraeli in 1884. These showed a political, economic and social life which had been seen neither in actuality nor in the literary world in Japan.

Disraeli’s novels inspired the political novel genre, the purpose of which was to hint at dissatisfaction in Japan and Japanese society by using literature. Political novels were: “Often set in foreign countries or ancient times, with an exotic cast of romantic or heroic characters, and written in a melodramatic and bombastic style,…[and] were popular among the young." Strange Encounters with Beautiful Women was written in a traditional sinified Japanese style (kanbun 漢文), which included Chinese poems called kanshi (漢詩). At this point in Japanese history, there were few women who could read kanbun and thus political novels were directed primarily at male intellectuals and students.

The plot of Kajin no Kigū follows the journeys of Tokai Sanshi through several lands of the world, including America, Egypt, Japan, China and others. The story begins in Philadelphia, where the protagonist, while gazing upon the Liberty Bell and Declaration of Independence, runs into two beautiful women, one from Ireland and the other from Spain, whose names Kōren and Yūran, though decidedly Chinese, can be interpreted as Colleen and Yolanda. After reflecting yet more on the patriotic struggles of the American people during the Revolutionary War and hearing the plight of the Irish from Colleen, Tōkai falls in love with her and embarks on a series of international adventures sometimes with her and sometimes without. During his travels Tōkai meets revolutionaries and nationalists from many countries, these meetings give him a vehicle to announce the oppression of many nations but also to voice his dissatisfaction and criticism of Japan, especially with regards to the events leading up to the Meiji Restoration. Horace Feldman comments on the popularity of Kajin no Kigū during the age of its publication: “In sentence style it is adjudged by the Japanese to be the best among the political novels, possibly because it conforms to the old traditions. It is written in an elegant kanbun and includes insertions of Chinese poems. Apparently this appealed to the interests of the students at the time. They gave an enthusiastic reception to this compromise between a Western subject, on the one hand, and Chinese style, on the other.” Kajin no Kigū, in spite of its socially conscious and politically progressive topics, is written a very pre-modern format. In addition to its greatly sinified vocabulary, like gesaku and older Chinese literature, it follows no real plot and is more like a “poetic travel-journal” or a series of adventure episodes. It was also composed originally with the help of and commentaries from many of Shiba Shirō's friends, which do not make it through to the English translations. This practice was commonplace in pre-modern Chinese and Japanese literature, as the notion of the author as the sole owner of a text is a modern one. Shiba Shirō established himself as the owner of Kajin no Kigū in a very modern fashion by filing a lawsuit against a man named Hattori Bushō and his publisher for publishing a manuscript with a similar plot, though it was written in hiragana and kanji instead of kanbun. Shiba had no qualms with an unauthorized Chinese translation of the work that appeared in China, though the translator made serious changes to the plot - such as the removal of the anti-Manchu/pro-Han sections - and seemed to have a limited command of the Japanese language.

== Major works ==
Title (Year Published)	Japanese Title (English Translation)	Comments
東洋之佳人 (1888)	Toyo no Kajin (Beauty of the East)
埃及近世史 (1889)	Ejiputo kindaishi (Contemporary History of Egypt)
佳人の奇遇 (1885–1897)	Kajin no Kigū (Strange Encounters with Beautiful Women)
広沢牧老人遺稿(1891)	Hirozawa Makirojin Iko (Notes of An Old Farm Man from Hirozawa)	Co-author with Hirosawa Yosuto (広沢安任)
日露戦争羽川六郎(1903)	Nichirosenso Hanekawarokuro(Russo-Japanese War: Sixth Son of Hanekawa)
