= Yi Jun-yong =

Korean noble (1870–1917)

Prince Yeongseon 영선군 永宣君
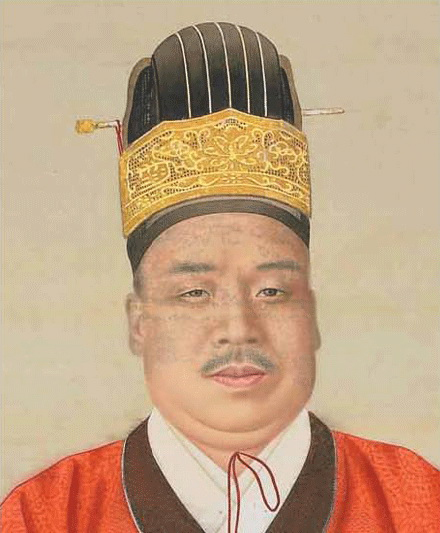

Duke of Unhyeongung
- Reign: 1912–1917
- Predecessor: Prince Imperial Heung
- Successor: Yi U
- Born: 23 July 1870; Unhyeongung, Hanseong, Joseon
- Died: 22 March 1917 (aged 46); Unhyeongung, Keijō, Korea, Empire of Japan
- Spouse: Lady Hong; Lady Kim
- Father: Prince Imperial Heung
- Mother: Lady Hong of the Pungsan Hong clan
- Religion: Confucianism
- Military career
- Branch: Military of the Korean Empire
- Service years: 1907–1910
- Rank: Major General

- Yi Jun-yong
- Hangul: 이준용
- Hanja: 李埈鎔
- RR: I Junyong
- MR: I Chunyong

Royal title
- Hangul: 영선군
- Hanja: 永宣君
- RR: Yeongseongun
- MR: Yŏngsŏn'gun

Art name
- Hangul: 석정, 송정
- Hanja: 石坡, 松亭
- RR: Seokjeong, Songjeong
- MR: Sŏkchŏng, Songjŏng

Courtesy name
- Hangul: 경극
- Hanja: 景極
- RR: Gyeonggeuk
- MR: Kyŏnggŭk

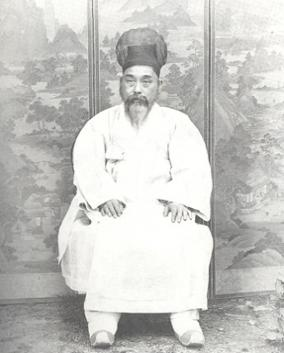
Yi Junyong (before. 1917's)

Yi Junyong (Korean: 이준용; 23 July 1870 – 22 March 1917), known as Prince Yeongseon (영선군) was a politician, literati, and member of the Korean Joseon dynasty's royal family, politicians, and later became a collaborator of Imperial Japan.

His courtesy name was Gyunggeuk (경극), and his art names were Seokjung (석정) and Songjung (송정). He was the grandson of the Heungseon Daewongun, and nephew and political rival of Emperor Gojong and Empress Myeongseong.

== Biography ==
Yi was born as a son of Prince Imperial Heung, older brother of Gojong of Korea in 1870. He entered the Joseon officialdom in 1884 as a Saema. In 1886, Yi passed the literary exam of civil service exam, and was appointed as Daegyo of Gyujanggak. The same year, Imperial Resident of Seoul Yuan Shikai attempted to abdicate Gojong and make Yi the king. However, opposition of Li Hongzhang prevented Yuan from carrying out his plot. After the assassination of Empress Myeongseong, Yi was paroled by the Japanese influence. Heungseon Daewongun advised him to refuge to Japan, but Yi stayed in Korea.

Prince Yeongseon attempted to overthrow his uncle, but his plot was revealed before overthrowing the government. He was imprisoned because of such attempts to overthrow the government, but he earned special amnesty from the Emperor. After being paroled, Yi traveled around Europe, and returned to Japan in January 1899. In June 1900, Yi was involved in the coup attempt of Ahn Gyeong-su.

On 27 November 1907, Yi was appointed as Major General of Imperial Korean Army.

== Family ==
- Father: Yi Jae-Myeon, Prince Imperial Heungchin (이재면 흥친왕; 22 August 1845 – 9 September 1912)
  - Grandfather: Yi Ha-Eung, Grand Internal Prince Heungseon (이하응 흥선대원군; 21 December 1820 – 22 February 1898)
  - Grandmother: Grand Internal Princess Consort Sunmok of the Yeoheung Min clan (순목대원비 민씨; 3 February 1818 – 8 January 1898)
- Mother: Lady Hong of the Pungsan Hong clan (풍산 홍씨; 8 April 1844 – 19 December 1887)
- Consorts and their Respective Issue(s):
1. Lady Hong of the Namyang Hong clan (남양 홍씨; ? – 17 August 1894)
2. Lady Kim of the Gwangsan Kim clan (광산 김씨; 19 June 1878 – 1955)
3. Jeon Sun-Hyeok (전순혁)
  1. Yi Jin-Wan (이진완)

== See also ==
- History of Korea
- Heungseon Daewongun
