= Gojong of Korea =

Monarch of Korea from 1864 to 1907

Gojong
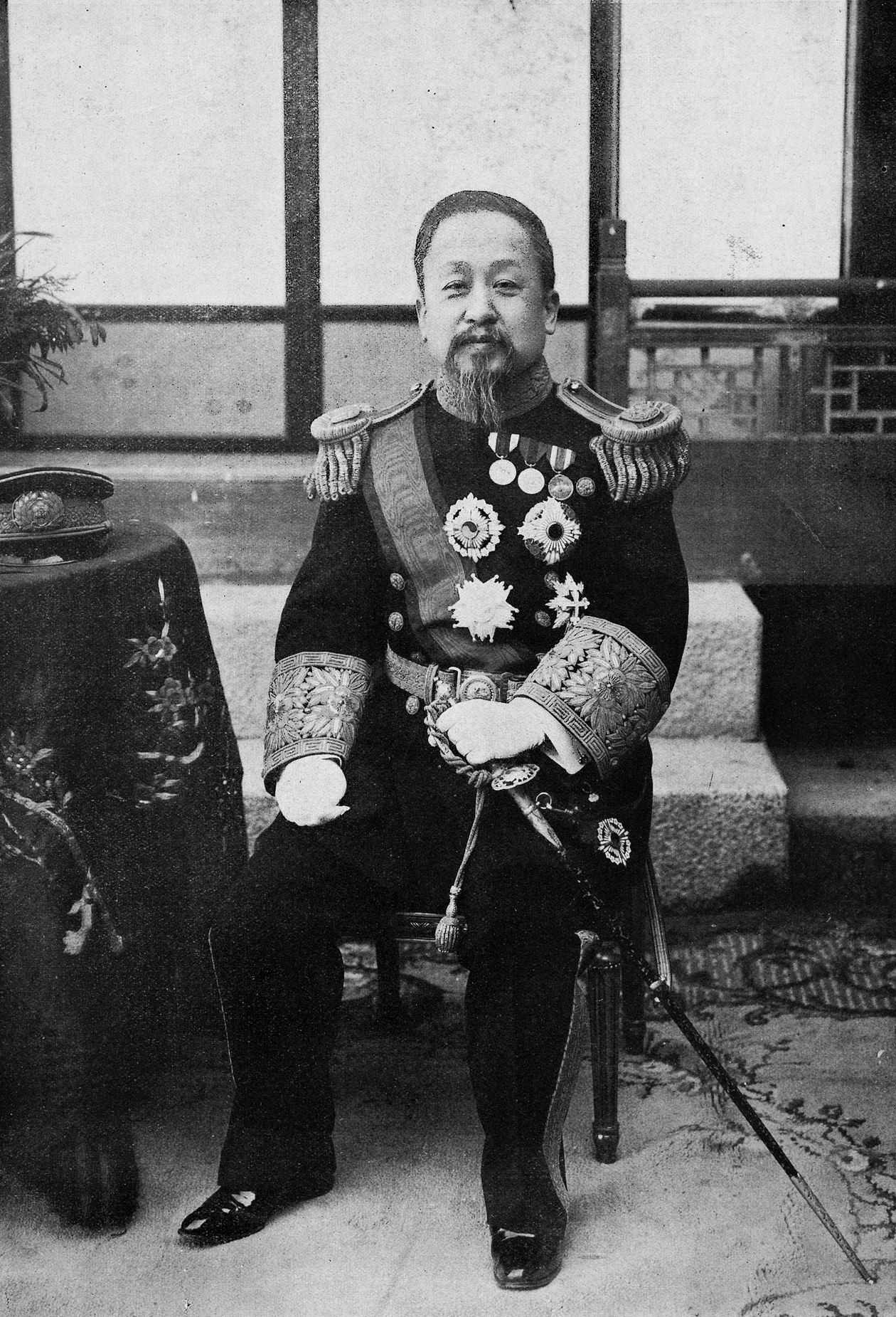
- Gojong in 1907

King Emeritus Yi of Deoksugung (Empire of Japan)
- Tenure: 29 August 1910 – 21 January 1919

Grand Emperor Emeritus of Korea
- Tenure: 19 July 1907 – 29 August 1910

Emperor of Korea
- Reign: 12 October 1897 – 19 July 1907
- Successor: Sunjong

King of Joseon (Note: Reigned from 12 January 1895 to 12 October 1897 as "King of the Great Joseon State" (대조선국 대군주; 大朝鮮國 大君主; lit. ''Grand Sovereign of the Great Joseon State''); this title was equivalent in all but name to that of emperor.)
- Reign: 16 January 1864 – 12 October 1897
- Enthronement: 21 January 1864; Injeongjeon, Changdeokgung
- Predecessor: Cheoljong
- Successor: Establishment of the Korean Empire
- Regent: Grand Queen Dowager Hyoyu (1864–1866); Grand Internal Prince Heungseon (1864–1873)
- Born: Yi Jaehwang (이재황; 李載晃); 8 September 1852; Unhyeongung, Hanseong, Joseon
- Died: 21 January 1919 (aged 66); Hamnyeongjeon, Deoksugung, Keijō, Chōsen
- Burial: Hongneung, Namyangju, South Korea
- Spouse: Empress Myeongseongtae (m. 1866; died 1895)
- Issue Detail: Sunjong of Korea; Prince Ui of the First Rank; Crown Prince Uimin; Princess Deokhye
Names
- Yi Hui (이희; 李㷩)
Era dates
- Adopted the era name of the Qing dynasty from 1864 to 1894 (Note: Dongchi (Tongzhi) (동치; 同治): 1864–1874 Gwangseo (Guangxu) (광서; 光緖): 1875–1894); Gaeguk (개국; 開國): 1894–1895; Geonyang (건양; 建陽): 1896–1897; Gwangmu (광무; 光武): 1897–1907
Regnal name
- Tongcheon Yungun Jogeuk Donryun Jeongseong Gwangui Myeongong Daedeok Yojun Sunhwi Umo Tanggyeong Eungmyeong Ipgi Jihwa Sinyeol Oehun Hongyeop Gyegi Seonryeok Geonhaeng Gonjeong Yeongui Honghyu Sugang (통천융운조극돈륜정성광의명공대덕요준순휘우모탕경응명입기지화신열외훈홍업계기선력건행곤정영의홍휴수강; 統天隆運肇極敦倫正聖光義明功大德堯峻舜徽禹謨湯敬應命立紀至化神烈巍勳洪業啓基宣曆乾行坤定英毅弘休壽康) (Note: Known as honorific name (존호; 尊號) in the Sinosphere, its closest equivalent in the English-speaking world is the regnal name.)
Posthumous name
- Emperor Munheon Mujang Inik Jeonghyo Tae (문헌무장인익정효태황제; 文憲武章仁翼貞孝太皇帝)
Temple name
- Gojong (고종; 高宗)
- Clan: Jeonju Yi
- Dynasty: Yi
- Father: Grand Internal Prince Heungseon (biological); King Munjo (adoptive)
- Mother: Grand Internal Princess Consort Sunmok (biological); Queen Sinjeong (adoptive)
- Religion: Confucianism (Neo-Confucianism)
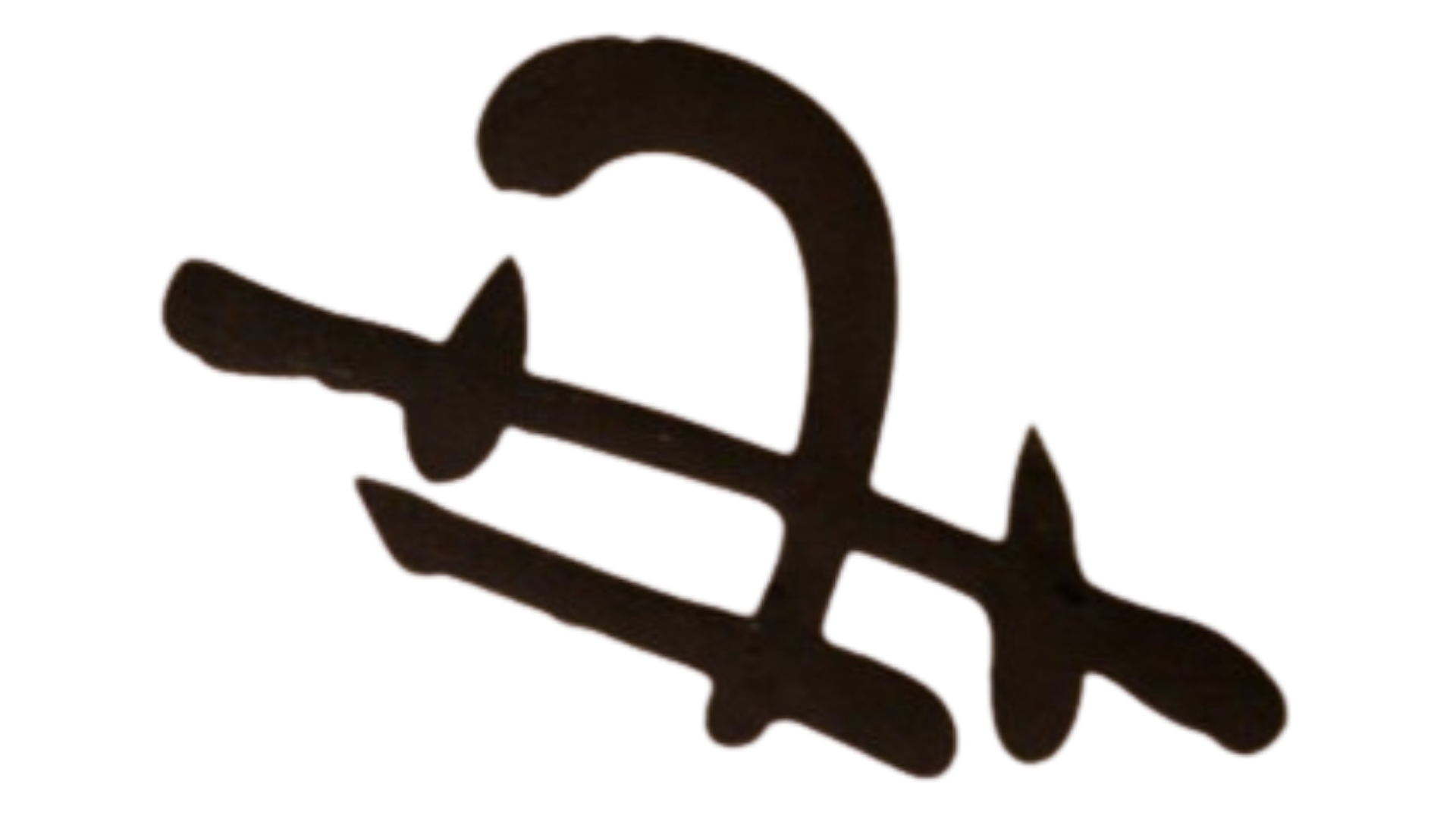
- Signature

Korean name
- Hangul: 고종
- Hanja: 高宗
- Lit.: "High Ancestor"
- RR: Gojong
- MR: Kojong

Monarch name
- Hangul: 광무제
- Hanja: 光武帝
- Lit.: "Bright and Martial Emperor"
- RR: Gwangmuje
- MR: Kwangmuje

Royal title
- Hangul: 익성군
- Hanja: 翼成君
- RR: Ikseonggun
- MR: Iksŏnggun

Art name
- Hangul: 주연
- Hanja: 珠淵
- RR: Juyeon
- MR: Chuyŏn

Courtesy name
- Hangul: 명부, 성림
- Hanja: 明夫, 聖臨
- RR: Myeongbu, Seongrim
- MR: Myŏngbu, Sŏngnim

Childhood name
- Hangul: 명복
- Hanja: 命福
- RR: Myeongbok
- MR: Myŏngbok

Gojong (Korean: 고종; Hanja: 高宗; 8 September 1852 (Note: In the Korean calendar (lunisolar), he was born on the 25th day of the 7th lunar month.) – 21 January 1919), personal name Yi Jaehwang, later changed to Yi Hui, also known as the Gwangmu Emperor, was the penultimate Korean monarch. He ruled Korea for 43 years, from 1864 until his forced abdication in 1907, initially as the 26th king of Joseon, and then as the first emperor of the Korean Empire. His wife, Queen Min (commonly known as Empress Myeongseong), played an active role in politics until her assassination carried out by the Japanese.

Gojong oversaw the bulk of the Korean monarchy's final years. He was born into a distant branch of the ruling House of Yi (a descendant of Grand Prince Inpyeong, the third son of King Injo), and acceded to the throne at the age of 11, upon the death of his nominal uncle, the heirless King Cheoljong. His biological father, Grand Internal Prince Heungseon (widely known as Heungseon Daewongun), acted as regent until he reached the age of majority, although he continued holding power until 1874. At this time, Korea was under policies of strict isolationism. By contrast, Japan had been rapidly modernizing under the Meiji Restoration. In 1876, Japan forcefully opened up Korea and began a decades-long process of moving the peninsula into its own sphere of influence. For the following few decades, Korea was highly unstable, and subjected to a number of foreign encroachments. Events such as the 1882 Imo Incident, the 1884 Kapsin Coup, the 1894–1895 Tonghak Peasant Revolution, and the 1895 assassination of Gojong's wife occurred during his reign. All of these events were related to or involved foreign powers.

All the while, Gojong attempted to consolidate control, seek foreign support, and modernize the country in order to keep Korea independent. He initiated the Gwangmu Reform, which sought to improve the military, industry, and education, to some amount of success. These reforms were seen as insufficient by some parts of the Korean literati, especially the Independence Club, which Gojong at first tolerated but eventually abolished in 1898. After Japan defeated China in the 1894–1895 First Sino-Japanese War, China lost its suzerainty over Korea, which it had held for centuries. In 1897, shortly after returning from his internal exile in the Russian legation in Seoul, Gojong proclaimed the establishment of the independent Korean Empire, and became its first emperor. Gojong's actions drew the ire of Japan. After Japan defeated Russia in the 1904–1905 Russo-Japanese War, it finally became the sole power in the region, and accelerated its pace of absorbing Korea. Two months after the victory, Korea under Gojong lost diplomatic sovereignty in the Japan–Korea Treaty of 1905, signed by the Five Eulsa Traitors. Gojong refused to sign it and made attempts to bring the treaty to the attention of the international community and convince leading powers of the treaty's illegitimacy, but to no avail.

Gojong was forced to abdicate in 1907, and was replaced by his son, Yi Cheok. He was then confined to Deoksugung. He made multiple attempts to escape and establish a government-in-exile abroad, but was unsuccessful each time. Korea formally became a Japanese colony in 1910, and the Korean imperial family was formally absorbed into the Japanese Imperial house. Gojong died on 21 January 1919, in conditions that were and still are seen in Korea as suspicious. The official cause of death was cerebral hemorrhage but rumors persisted that Gojong had been poisoned by Japan. His death was a direct catalyst for the March First Movement, which in turn bolstered the Korean independence movement.

== Early life ==
Yi Myeong-bok was born on 25 July 1852, in Jeongseonbang (정선방; 貞善坊) district, Seoul, Joseon. He was born into the royal House of Yi, and was the son of Yi Ha-eung and Lady Min. After King Cheoljong died without son, the influential Andong Kim clan nominated Yi as the next King. Yi became Prince Ik-seon, shortly before his coronation. He entered the palace on 9 December 1863, and his father and mother were ennobled.

== King of Joseon ==
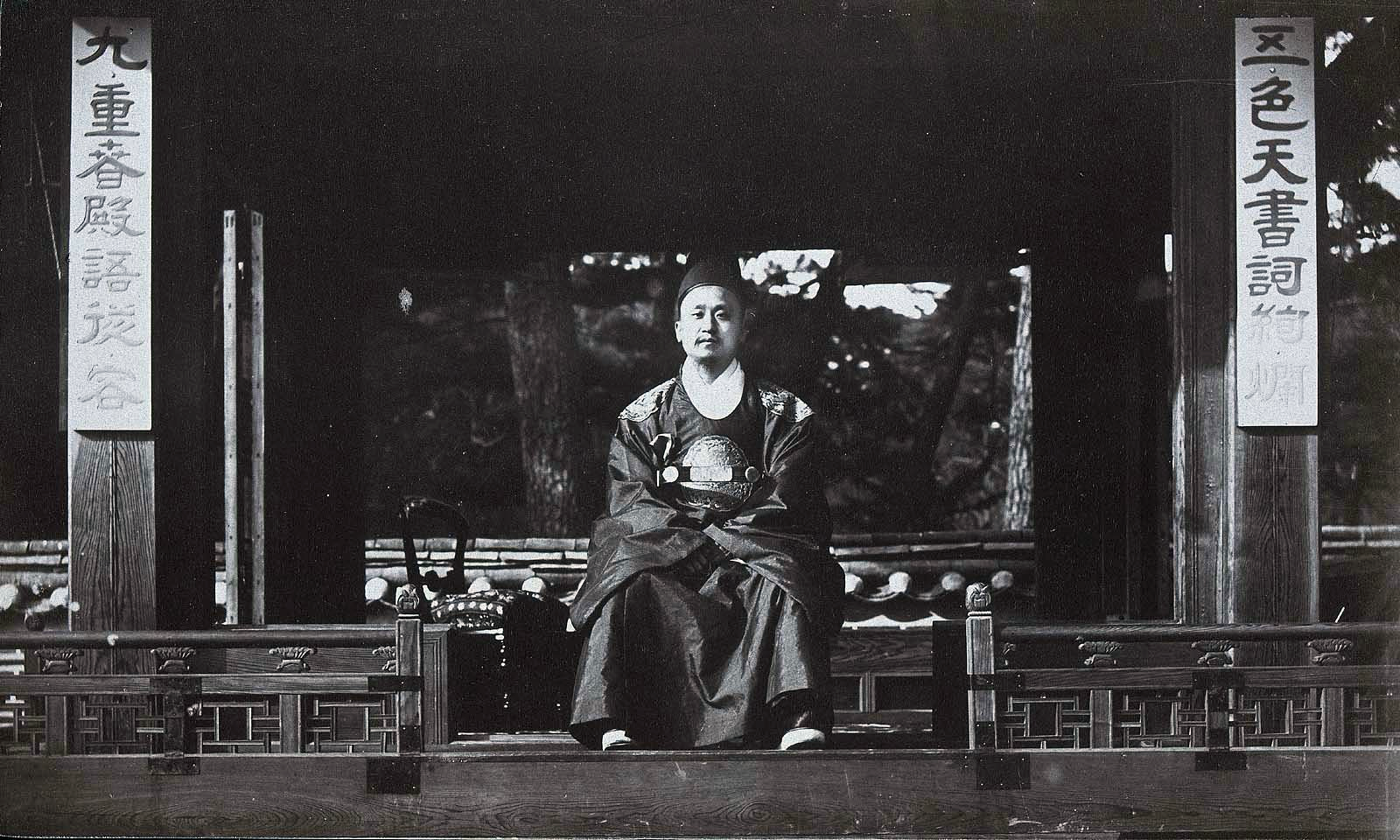
Gojong in 1884. Photo by Percival Lowell

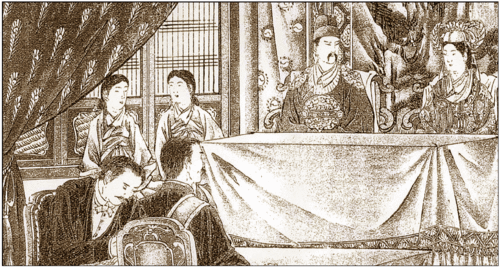
Japanese illustration of Gojong and Queen Min receiving Inoue Kaoru.

On 13 December 1863, Yi was crowned in Injeong gate of Changdeokgung. He was only twelve years old when he was crowned. Queen Sinjeong acted as regent until he became an adult. His father, Prince Heungseon Daewongun, assisted in the affairs of Queen Sinjeong's regency. In 1866, when the queen proclaimed the abolishment of the regency, Gojong's rule started. On 6 March 1866, Min Chi-rok's daughter, Lady Min was selected as the new queen. Even though Gojong's father Daewongun had no rights to maintain the regency, he still acted as regent illegally.

During the mid-1860s, the Daewongun was the main proponent of isolationism and was responsible for the persecution of native and foreign Catholics, a policy that led directly to the French and the United States' expeditions to Korea, in 1866 and 1871 respectively. The early years of the Daewongun's rule also witnessed a concerted effort to restore the largely dilapidated Gyeongbokgung, the seat of royal authority. During this time, the Seowon (private academies that often doubled as epicenters of factional power), and the power wielded by the Andong Kim clan in particular were dismantled.

Finally in 1873, Gojong announced the assumption of his direct royal rule. In November 1874, with the retirement of the Daewongun, Gojong's consort, Queen Min (posthumously known as Empress Myeongseong) and Yeoheung Min clan, gained complete control over the court, filling senior court positions with members of her family. It was an open secret that the court and its policy were controlled by the queen consort.

Gojong tried to strengthen the king's authority by giving important positions to consort kins and royal family members. It is known that Min Young-hwan, who was a distant relative of Queen Min, was Gojong's favorite official.

=== External pressures and unequal treaties ===
In the 19th century, tensions mounted between Qing China and Imperial Japan, culminating in the First Sino-Japanese War in 1894–1895. Much of this war was fought on the Korean peninsula. Japan, having acquired Western military technology after the Meiji Restoration, secured a victory against Joseon forces in Ganghwa Island, forcing Joseon to sign the Treaty of Ganghwa in 1876. Japan encroached upon Korean territory in search of fish, iron ore, and other natural resources. It also established a strong economic presence in the peninsula, heralding the beginning of Japanese imperialist expansion in East Asia. These events were the roots of Gojong's antipathy to the Japanese Empire.

The Treaty of Ganghwa became the first unequal treaty signed between Korea and a foreign country; it gave extraterritorial rights to Japanese citizens in Korea and forced the Korean government to open three ports, Busan, Chemulpo (Incheon), and Wonsan, to Japanese and foreign trade. With the signing of such a lopsided treaty, Korea became easy prey for competing imperialistic powers, paving the way for Korea's annexation by Japan.

=== Imo Rebellion and Kapsin Coup ===
King Gojong began to rely on a new paid army (byeolgigun) of soldiers equipped with rifles. These new armies were requested by the Gaehwa Party and was supervised by Yun Ung-nyeol. In contrast to the well-armed army, the old army had not received a salary for 13 months. The tattered army was finally paid one month's salary. Enraged, the old army sparked a riot, and the Daewongun seized power. When the Imo Incident happened, Queen Min requested the Qing Empire for military support. On 27 June 1882, the Qing deployed about 3,000 soldiers in Seoul. They kidnapped the Daewongun on 7 July 1882, which led the Min family to regain political power.

During the Imo incident when Queen Min was taking refuge in her relative's villa, Lady Seon-yeong of the Yeongwol Eom clan showed extreme devotion towards King Gojong. He rewarded her fealty by promoting her to the rank of Jimil Sanggung (5th senior rank of Women of the Internal Court).

On 4 December 1884, five revolutionaries attempted a coup d'état by leading a small anti-old minister army to detain King Gojong and Queen Min. These revolutionaries tried to remove the Qing army from Korea. The Kapsin Coup failed after 3 days. Some of its leaders, including Kim Okkyun, fled to Japan, and others were executed.

While suppressing this coup, Gojong actively invited Qing only to increase the Yuan Shikai's influence over Korea. Yet Gojong did try to maintain the independence of his nation. The Chinese even considered abdicating Gojong for consolidation of Qing influence in Korea. For Gojong, he believed that relying on to stronger powers was the best solution in the situation without neither army to guard him nor money. However, these decision never followed his own responsibility, ultimately poisoning his very own nation he intended to save.

=== Peasant revolts ===
Widespread poverty presented significant challenges to the 19th century Joseon Dynasty. Starvation was rampant, and much of the populace lived in run-down shanties lined along dirt roads. Famine, poverty, crushing taxes, and corruption among the ruling class, led to many notable peasant revolts in the 19th century.

In 1894, the Donghak Peasant Revolution took hold as an anti-government, anti-yangban, and anti-foreign campaign. One leading cause of the revolution was the tax system implemented by Queen Min. Gojong asked for the assistance from the Chinese and Japanese to crush the revolution. Yi Jun-yong and others coordinated with peasants to assassinate Gojong. However, the plot was leaked and the revolution failed. Although the revolution ultimately failed, many of the peasants' grievances were later addressed with the Kabo Reform.

One of the biggest reforms in 1894 was abolishing the slave (nobi) system, which had existed as far back as the Gojoseon period.

=== Assassination of Queen Min ===
In 1895, Queen Min, posthumously elevated to Empress Myeongseong, was assassinated by Japanese agents. The Japanese minister to Korea, Miura Gorō, orchestrated the plot against her. A group of Japanese agents entered Gyeongbokgung in Seoul, which was under guard by Korean troops sympathetic to the Japanese, and the queen was killed in the palace. The queen had attempted to counter Japanese interference in Korea. She and her court were pro-Russian in the immediate run-up to the assassination.

=== Anti-Japanese sentiments in Korea ===
In 1895 Japan won the First Sino-Japanese War, expanding its influence over the Korean government. The Kabo Reforms and the assassination of the queen stirred controversy in Korea, fomenting Korean anti-Japanese sentiment. Gojong's antipathy toward the Japanese intensified, and he turned to Russia as an ally by signing Russia–Korea Treaty of 1884. He sent many emissaries to Russian Empire.

Some Confucian scholars, as well as peasants, formed over 60 successive righteous armies to fight for Korean freedom. These armies were preceded by the Donghak movement and succeeded by various Korean independence movements.

=== Internal exile to the Russian legation ===
Pro-Japanese government grew, while anti-Japanese politicians were either killed or fled for their survival after the Chun Sang Door Incident in 1895. Gojong perceived the need for refuge.

On 11 February 1896, King Gojong and his crown prince fled from the Gyeongbokgung to the Russian legation in Seoul, from where they governed for about one year, an event known as Gojong's internal exile to the Russian legation. Because of staying in the Russian legation many concessions of Korea were taken by Russia. Gojong sent Min Young-hwan to the coronation of Nicholas II of Russia. Min returned to Korea in October 1896 with Russian Army instructors. These instructors were able to train guards which enabled Gojong to return to palace in February 1897.

== Emperor of Korea ==
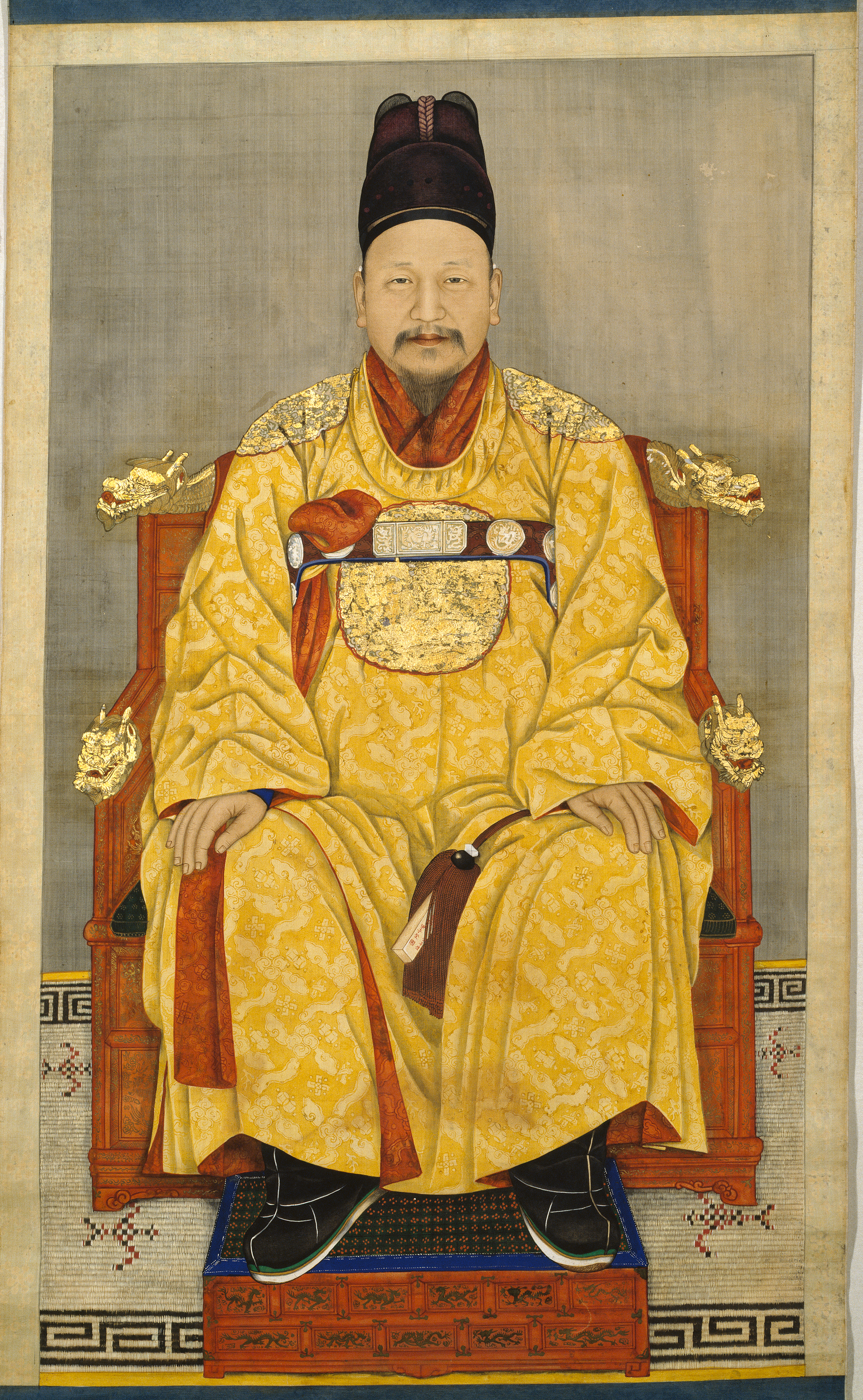
Portrait of Gojong (age 49), by Chae Yong-sin

=== Coronation ===
On 13 October 1897, Gojong declared himself Emperor of Korea in a ceremony at the newly constructed altar Hwangudan. The name of the state was also changed to the Great Korean Empire, and a new era name Gwangmu (광무; 光武; lit. 'shining and martial') was declared. This was a symbolic gesture to mark the end of Qing's suzerainty over Korea. That same day, Gojong appointed Sunjong as the Imperial Crown Prince.

=== Consolidation of power and reforms ===
When the Daewongun died in 1898, Emperor Gwangmu refused to attend the funeral of his father because of their poor relationship. But it was also reported that the emperor's cries could be heard when he looked over the palace wall.

On 17 August 1899, Gojong enacted the Constitution of the Korean Empire, which granted him absolute power. Despite this, Gojong still entertained the possibility of establishing a constitutional monarchy. He discussed proposals proposed by the reformist Independence Club and Gaehwa Party. However, his reforms were seen as insufficient by members of the Independence Club, which angered them. After rumors emerged, possibly spread by conservative politicians, that the Independence Club planned to abolish the empire and proclaim a republic, Gojong abolished them instead.

Gojong was subjected to many assassination or abdication attempts. First in July 1898, Ahn Gyeong-su, the Minister of Military tried to abdicate Gojong. Ahn was executed for conspiracy on 28 May 1900. Second, on 12 September 1898, Kim Hong-rok tried to assassinate Gojong with by instilling poison in Gojong's coffee. In 1904, some Korean students in Japan tried to make Gojong abdicate, and make Prince Imperial Ui the emperor.

=== Efforts to secure Korea's independence ===
==== Military reforms ====
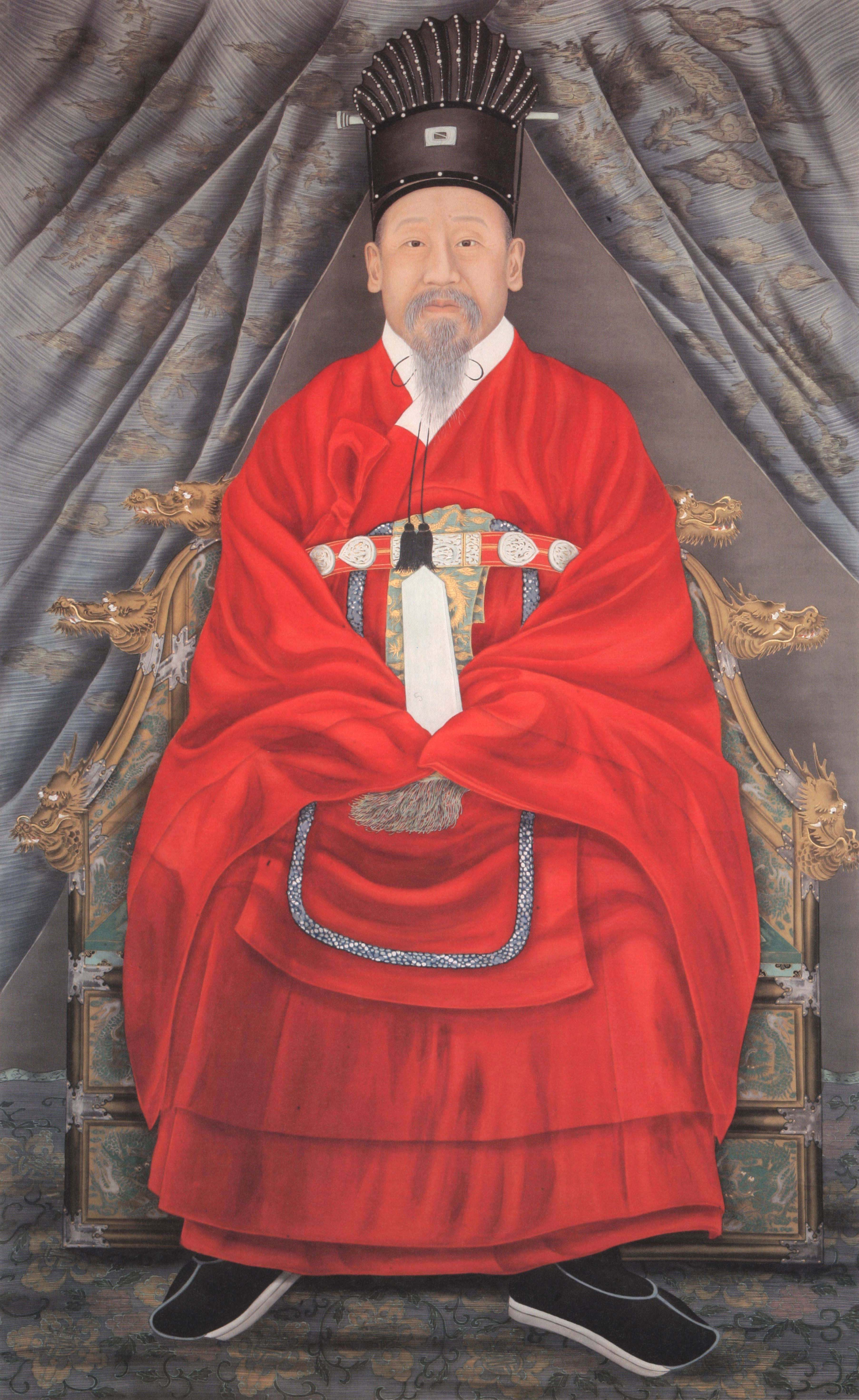
Portrait of Gojong wearing Tongcheonggwan and Gangsapo

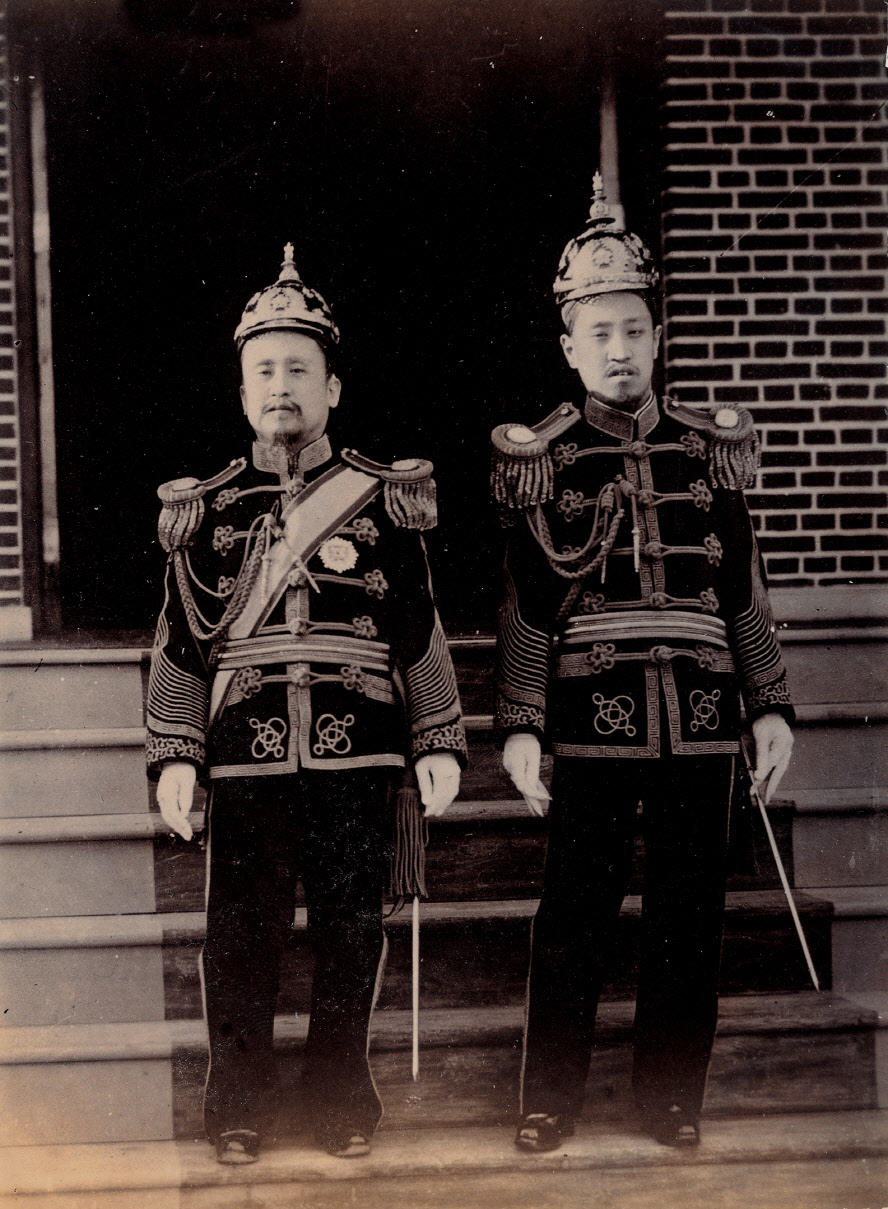
Gojong and the Crown Prince Sunjong with their Pickelhaube

Gojong was acutely aware of Korea's, and especially its army's, need to modernize. Min Young-hwan brought on Russian instructors that were tasked with modernizing the army. Gojong was pleased with their work. In March 1898, the Russian instructors departed, and Gojong ordered the Ministry of Military to take over. By the request of the Minister of Military, Yi Jong-geon, a military academy was established in April 1898. In order to command both the army and navy, Gojong appointed himself as the Grand Field Marshal of the Imperial Korean Armed Forces and the Crown Prince as Field Marshal on 29 June 1898.

On 2 July 1898, Gojong assumed full control over the army. A Board of Marshals was established on 1 August 1899, which Gojong used to further his control. In 1899, he bought weapons from various countries and sent many cadets to Imperial Japanese Army Academy. Meanwhile, he continued expanding the military. By July 1900, there were 17,000 men of the Jinwidae. In 1901, about 44 percent of the Empire's total revenue was used for the military.

==== Diplomatic efforts ====
Gojong also attempted to establish ties with other countries. For example, Yi Han-eung was sent to London in 1901 as the acting diplomatic minister to the United Kingdom. But Great Britain rebuffed Yi's overtures, and established the Anglo-Japanese Alliance in 1902. Yi killed himself in protest in May 1905.

In 1905, Gojong wrote a letter to US President Theodore Roosevelt. But the Eulsa Treaty had already been signed by the time his envoy, Homer Hulbert, had delivered the letter. In it, Gojong wrote:

For the sake of the Korean people we beg of you to use your powerful influence in this direction and to refuse to become a party to the further degradation of this Empire and the extinguishment of our last hope.

== Abdication ==
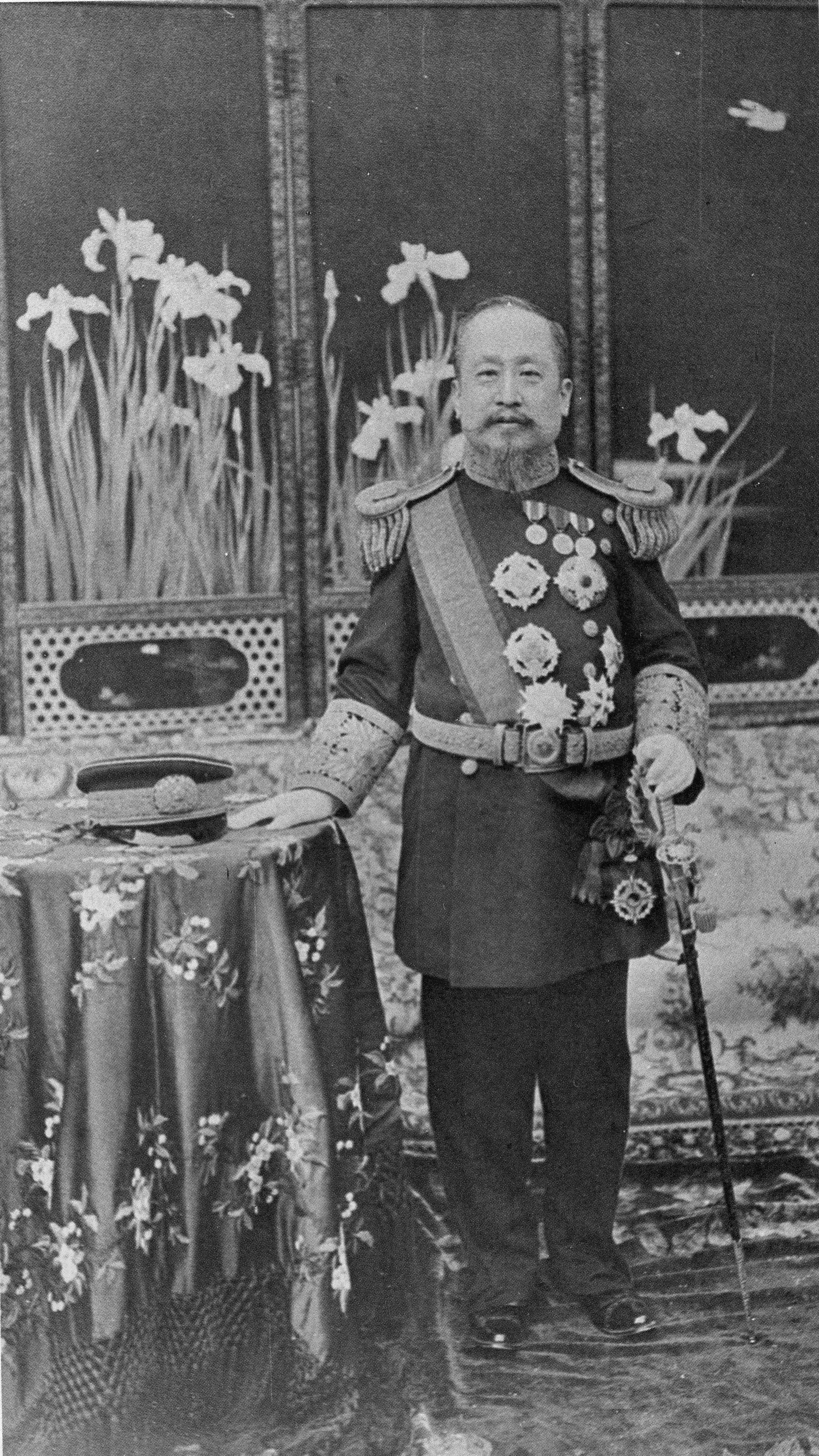
Gojong wearing a western-style uniform (태황제 예복; 太皇帝 禮服). He wore it since the abdication of 1907.

On 2 July 1907, the information about the dispatch of the envoys reached the ears of Resident-General Itō Hirobumi at the time. Ito was experienced.

"If this envoy incident is based on a decree, it is believed to be a good opportunity to take decisive action regarding Korea. In other words, I believe it will be a good opportunity for us to have fiscal power, military power, or judicial power."

— Telegram sent by Resident-General Ito to the Japanese Foreign Minister at 2:00 a.m. on July 3, 1907, Document 4 of the Resident-General's Office.

On the previous day, the 6th, Song Pyŏngjun, a Minister of Agriculture, Commerce and Industry, made a demand to Emperor Gojong.

"Either go to Japan yourself and apologize to the Emperor, or apologize to General Hasegawa in front of the Daehan Gate."

According to Japanese records, the former council meeting on this day lasted for two hours, during which the Prime Minister instead made a declaration of war and threatened the Emperor, while the Minister of Agriculture, Commerce and Industry pressured him to apologize in front of the palace.

On 16 July, the pro-Japanese cabinet met with the Emperor and demanded that he sign the Eulsa Treaty as a measure to stabilize the country, apologize to the Japanese Emperor, and abdicate the throne. Gojong refused. On 17 July, Seoul was in turmoil. Wall posters appeared in Jongno and other places, saying, "Look at the Imjin War! Is it the result of the Queen's execution incident?" "The Japanese aggression is unstoppable and imminent." The cabinet once again demanded the Emperor's abdication. An enraged Gojong once again refused.

On 18 July, a cabinet meeting lasted for two hours at Yi Wan-yong's residence. The agenda was the Emperor's abdication. The lackeys who received orders from Resident-General Ito Hirobumi announced the Emperor's abdication at 8 p.m. The area outside Gyeongun Palace was surrounded by the pro-Japanese organization Iljinhoe, led by Song Pyŏngjun. (Note: From "Newly Revised Korean History") The Emperor requested more time (帝答之以思數日而下批). The meeting, which ended at 10 p.m., resumed at 1 a.m. the next morning.

The details of this meeting are recorded in "Maechen Yarok" by Hwang Hyeon and "Daehan Gye-nyeon-sa" (A History of Late Korean Empire) written by Jung Gyo.

"Wan-yong and seven others entered. The Emperor refused (to abdicate). Wan-yong and Byeong-jun used disrespectful language countless times. Lee Byeong-mu threatened with a drawn sword (李秉武拔劒威嚇)."

— Jung Gyo, "Daehan Gye-nyeon-sa"

"Yi Wan-yong drew his sword and shouted in a rough voice, 'Do you not understand what kind of world we are in right now?' People around tried to stab Yi Wan-yong with a sword, but the Emperor eventually waved him off and said, 'In that case, it would be better to step down first.'"

— Hwang Hyeon, "Maechen Yarok"

Yi Wan-yong and others withdrew. The overnight council meeting ended at 5 a.m. The attendants entered the meeting hiding pistols in their bosoms. The Minister of Justice Jo Jung-eung cut off all external telephone lines. (Note: From "Chosun Saekin-shi with Han-guk Gyeong-hap-chi") (Note: "Thousands of people gathered in front of the palace in the morning, and the shops closed and expressed condolences." (From a telegram from the Resident-General's Office, 2:45 p.m., 19 July 1907))

On that day, Gojong declared that he would pass the throne to his son. The abdication ceremony took place the next day, 20 July. Gojong personally chose the date and added, "Follow the temporary regulations (權停例)." (Note: From "The Annals of Gojong, July 19, 1907") The temporary regulations refer to a simplified ritual performed by the monarch without sitting on the throne. The Emperor's abdication ceremony took place without the presence of Gojong or Sunjong. (Note: "Thousands of people gathered in front of the palace in the morning, and the shops closed and expressed condolences." (From a telegram from the Resident-General's Office, 2:45 p.m., 19 July 1907))

The essential element for depriving of ruling power is the deprivation of military power. Yi Byeong-mu, who drew a sword against King Gojong and led the military's neutralization under the command of Ito, carried out the military disarmament. Four days later, the Japan-Korea Treaty of 1907 was announced. The key point was the dissolution of the Korean Empire's military. The secret provisions of the treaty included the following clauses: all military forces except the Royal Guards will be dissolved. Disbanded soldiers will be relocated to Gando and engaged in reclamation. They will also be engaged in reclamation in the desolate areas of the country. The person who announced the dissolution of the military was Prime Minister Yi Wan-yong, and the Minister of Defense, Yi Byeong-mu. (Note: Daehan Maeil Shinbo, 2 August 1907)

On 19 July, when Emperor Gojong was being threatened, the royal guard unit, which was the palace guard, attempted to enter Gyeongun Palace. (Note: According to a secret document sent by Ito, "There was clear evidence that King Gojong called in troops to the palace with the intention of killing the royal relatives at an appropriate opportunity.")

"Yi Byeong-mu ordered General Jung Wi-jae, the commander of the 3rd Battalion of the 1st Regiment of the Capital Guards, to bring in 70 palace guards stationed outside the palace. When Jung Wi-jae refused, Hanmyeong, the commander of the palace guards, drew his sword and shouted at the military dictatorship to resist. The palace guards, wearing civilian clothes and carrying bayonets, entered the palace."

— From Daehan Gye-nyeon-sa

On that night, at that time, Yi Byeong-mu asked the Japanese for a favor, and if Jung Wi-jae continued to doubt him, he told him to take away his weapons. (Note: Maechen Yarok)

On 20 July 1907, Gojong was dethroned. Some officials, such as Pak Yŏnghyo, and Yi Tojae, tried to assassinate the members of cabinet of Ye Wanyong, who led the abdication. After abdicating, Emperor Gojong was confined to his palace Deoksugung, and the Japanese replaced him with his son, Sunjong.

In June 1910, Gojong tried to escape to Primorsky Krai in Russia and establish a government in exile, but he failed to do so. On 22 August 1910, Korea was formally annexed by Japan. Gojong lost his imperial title, and was instead granted the title, "King Emeritus Yi of Deoksu" (徳寿宮李太王), and was recognized as a member of the imperial family of Japan. In 1915, Gojong again tried to flee from his confinement with the help of Sangsul, but failed. In 1918, he made another attempt, this time with the goal of going to Beijing with Lee Hoe-yeong, but again failed.

== Death and legacy ==
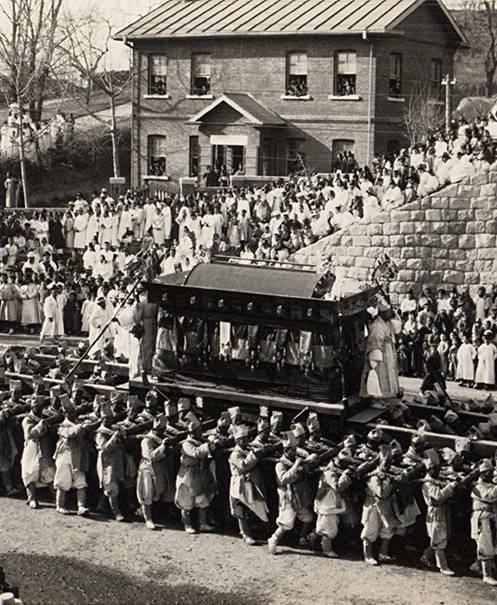
Gojong's funeral procession (1 March 1919)

On 21 January 1919, Gojong died suddenly at Deoksugung at the age of 66. There was and still is speculation that Gojong had been poisoned by Japan. The idea first emerged and was widely circulated around the time of his death.

His death and subsequent funeral proved a catalyst for the March First Movement for Korean independence from Japanese rule. He is buried with his wife at the imperial tomb of Hongneung (홍릉; 洪陵), Namyangju, Gyeonggi Province. The couple's grave is now considered a UNESCO World Heritage site, as part of the Royal Tombs of the Joseon dynasty.

== Family ==
- Father: Grand Internal Prince Heungseon (흥선대원군; 24 January 1821 – 22 February 1898)
  - Grandfather: Prince Namyeon (남연군; 21 September 1788 – 4 May 1836)
  - Grandmother: Princess Consort Yeoheung (여흥군부인), of the Yeoheung Min clan (여흥 민씨; 1784–1831)
- Adoptive father: King Munjo (문조대왕; 18 September 1809 – 25 June 1830)
- Mother: Grand Internal Princess Consort Sunmok (순목부대부인), of the Yeoheung Min clan (여흥 민씨; 3 February 1818 – 8 January 1898)
  - Grandfather: Min Chi-gu (민치구; 1795–1875)
  - Grandmother: Lady, of the Jeonju Yi clan (전주 이씨; ?–1873)
- Adoptive mother: Queen Sinjeong (신정왕후), of the Pungyang Jo clan (풍양 조씨; 9 January 1809 – 23 May 1890)

Consort(s) and their respective issue

- Empress Myeongseongtae (명성태황후), of the Yeoheung Min clan (여흥 민씨; 17 November 1851 – 8 October 1895), given name Ja-yeong (자영)
  - Unnamed son (4 – 8 November 1871)
  - Unnamed daughter (3 February – 28 September 1873)
  - Yi Cheok (이척), Emperor Sunjong (순종황제; 25 March 1874 – 25 April 1926), second son
  - Unnamed son (5 – 18 April 1875)
  - Unnamed son (18 February – 5 June 1878)
- Imperial Noble Consort Sunheon (순헌황귀비), of the Yeongwol Eom clan (영월 엄씨; 2 February 1854 – 20 July 1911), given name Seon-yeong (선영)
  - Yi Un (이은), Crown Prince Uimin (의민태자; 20 October 1897 – 1 May 1970), fourth son
- Gwiin of Yeongbodang (영보당 귀인), of the Yi clan (이씨; 14 March 1843 – 17 December 1928), given name Sun-ah (순아)
  - Yi Seon (이선), Prince Wan of the First Rank (완친왕; 31 May 1868 – 21 February 1880), first son
  - Unnamed daughter
- Gwiin (귀인), of the Deoksu Jang clan (덕수 장씨; 12 October 1838 – 14 October 1887)
  - Yi Kang (이강), Prince Ui of the First Rank (의친왕; 30 March 1877 – 16 August 1955), third son
- Gwiin of Naeandang (내안당 귀인), of the Yi clan (이씨; 1847 – 13 February 1914)
  - Unnamed daughter (1869–?)
- Gwiin of Bohyeondang (보현당 귀인), of the Haeju Jeong clan (해주 정씨; 10 April 1882 – 20 March 1946)
  - Yi U (이우; 20 August 1915 – 25 July 1916), sixth son
- Gwiin of Boknyeongdang (복녕당 귀인), of the Chungju Yang clan (충주 양씨; 27 September 1882 – 30 May 1929), given name Chun-gi (춘기)
  - Princess Deokhye (덕혜옹주; 25 May 1912 – 21 April 1989), first daughter
- Gwiin of Gwanghwadang (광화당 귀인), of the Yi clan (이씨; 1885 – 10 November 1965), given name Wan-deok (완덕)
  - Yi Yuk (이육; 3 July 1914 – 22 January 1915), fifth son
- Palace Lady of Samchukdang (삼축당 상궁), of the Andong Kim clan (안동 김씨; 1890 – 23 September 1970), given name Ok-gi (옥기) (Note: Sanggung (상궁; 尚宫); female official of the senior fifth rank in the internal court.)
- Palace Lady of Jeonghwadang (정화당 상궁), of the Gwangsan Kim clan (광산 김씨)

== Ancestry ==
Ancestors of Emperor Gojong

Yi Jin-ik (이진익)
Yi Byeong-won (이병원)
Lady, of the Cheongpung Kim clan (청풍 김씨)
Prince Namyeon (남연군)
Jeong Ui-hwan (정의환)
Lady, of the Yeonil Jeong clan (연일 정씨)
Grand Internal Prince Heungseon (흥선대원군)
Min Baek-heon (민백헌)
Min Gyeong-hyeok (민경혁)
Princess Consort Yeoheung, of the Yeoheung Min clan (여흥군부인 여흥 민씨)
Lady, of the Cheongju Han clan (청주 한씨)
Emperor Gojong
Min Baek-sul (민백술)
Min Dan-hyeon (민단현)
Min Chi-gu (민치구)
Lady, of the Miryang Park clan (밀양 박씨)
Grand Internal Princess Consort Sunmok, of the Yeoheung Min clan (순목부대부인 여흥 민씨)
Yi Min-sik (이민식)
Yi Ok (이옥)
Lady, of the Cheongju Han clan (청주 한씨)
Lady, of the Jeonju Yi clan (전주 이씨)
Kim Nak-won (김낙원)
Lady, of the Gyeongju Kim clan (경주 김씨)

== Honors ==
Korean honors

- Founder and Sovereign of the Grand Order of the Golden Ruler – 17 April 1900
- Founder and Sovereign of the Grand Order of the Auspicious Stars – 12 August 1902
- Founder and Sovereign of the Grand Order of the Plum Blossoms – 17 April 1900
- Founder and Sovereign of the Order of the National Crest – 17 April 1900
- Founder and Sovereign of the Order of the Purple Falcon – 16 April 1901
- Founder and Sovereign of the Order of the Eight Trigrams – 16 April 1901
- Grand Cordon of the Grand Order of the Auspicious Phoenix – 1907

Foreign honors

- Italy: Grand Cross of the Order of Saints Maurice and Lazarus – 23 July 1895
- France: Grand Cross of the Legion of Honour – 23 July 1895
- Japan
  - Grand Cordon of the Order of the Chrysanthemum – 23 March 1897
  - Korean Colonization Decoration – 1 August 1912
- United Kingdom: Honorary Grand Commander of the Order of the Indian Empire – 17 December 1900
- Spain: Grand Cross of the Order of Charles III, with Collar – 1900
- Belgium: Grand Cordon of the Royal Order of Leopold – 23 March 1901
- China: Order of the Double Dragon, Class I Grade I – 1 December 1903
- Russia: Knight of the Order of St. Stanislaus, 1st Class – 1 December 1903
- Denmark: Knight of the Order of the Elephant – 31 August 1903
- German Empire: Knight of the Order of the Black Eagle – 20 March 1904

== In popular culture ==
- Portrayed by Lee Jin-woo and Lee Joon in the 2001–2002 KBS2 TV series Empress Myeongseong.
- Portrayed by Kim Young-min in the 2009 film The Sword with No Name.
- Portrayed by Choi Jong-hwan in the 2010 SBS TV series Jejungwon.
- Portrayed by Park Hee-soon in the 2012 film Gabi.
- Portrayed by Lee Min-woo in the 2014 KBS2 TV series Gunman in Joseon.
- Portrayed by Park Min-sang in the 2016 film The Map Against The World.
- Portrayed by Baek Yoon-sik in the 2016 film The Last Princess.
- Portrayed by Kang Yi-seok and Lee Seung-joon in the 2018 tvN TV series Mr. Sunshine.

== See also ==
- History of Korea
- List of monarchs of Korea
- Styles and titles in Joseon
- Politics of Joseon
- Society of Joseon
- List of state leaders deposed by foreign powers in the 20th and 21st century

== Bibliography ==
- Yi, Seoung-hyeon (2014). 민영환의 '殉國' 담론에 대한 고찰. 江原史學. 26: 99–146.
- Park, Gul-sun (2019). "A Comparison between the Independence Movement Theory and the Independence Movement of Hoeyeong Lee and Sangseol Lee" 이회영(李會榮)과 이상설(李相卨)의 독립운동론과 독립운동 비교. 동북아역사논총. 64 (64). doi:10.23037/dyn.2019..64.003 – via KCI.

Gojong of Korea House of Yi Born: 8 September 1852 Died: 21 January 1919
Royal titles
Preceded by Cheoljong	King of Joseon; 16 January 1864 – 12 October 1897	Establishment of the Korean Empire
Establishment of the Korean Empire	Emperor of Korea; 12 October 1897 – 19 July 1907	Succeeded by Sunjong
