= List of recipients of the Order of the Golden Ruler =

This is a list of Recipients of the Order of the Golden Ruler. The Order of the Golden Ruler was an Order of chivalry of the Korean Empire which was part of the Gwangmu Reform, which modernized the Korean Empire. The order was given to the Imperial Family who will be enthroned and the family's relatives, officials and soldiers as the will of the Emperor.

| Name | Position and Title | Nationality | Date | Image | Source |
|---|---|---|---|---|---|
| Gojong | Emperor of Korea | Korean Empire | | | |
| Yi Cheock | Crown Prince | Korean Empire | | | |
| Yi Un | Crown Prince | Korean Empire | | | |
| Prince Henry of Prussia | Prince | German Empire | 20 March 1904 | | |
| Itō Hirobumi | Marquess | Japanese Empire | 24 March 1904 | | |
| Yi Seung-eung | Member of House of Yi | Korean Empire | 16 September 1904 | — | |
| Prince Fushimi Hiroyasu | Prince of the Japanese Empire | Japanese Empire | 23 May 1905 | | |
| Min Young-hwan | Leutnant General | Korean Empire | 1 December 1905 | | |
| Jo Byeong-se | Special official | Korean Empire | 2 December 1905 | — | |
| Yi Kang | Prince | Korean Empire | 9 April 1905 | | |
| Prince Leopold Clement of Saxe-Coburg and Gotha | Grand Duke | Austria-Hungary | 27 February 1906 | | |
| Hasegawa Yoshimichi | General of Infantry; Baron | Japanese Empire | 27 August 1907 | | |
| Prince Arisugawa Takehito | Member of the Imperial House of Japan | Japanese Empire | 18 October 1907 | | |
| Katsura Tarō | General of Infantry; Marquess | Japanese Empire | 18 October 1907 | | |
| Tōgō Heihachirō | Admiral; Count | Japanese Empire | 18 October 1907 | | |
| Yamagata Aritomo | General of Infantry; Duke | Japanese Empire | 29 January 1908 | | |
| Saionji Kinmochi | prime minister Marquess | Japanese Empire | 29 January 1908 | | |
| Prince Tsunehisa Takeda | Member of the Imperial House of Japan | Japanese Empire | 11 May 1908 | | |
| Prince Nashimoto Morimasa | Member of the Imperial House of Japan | Japanese Empire | 21 July 1909 | | |
| Prince Imperial Heung | Prince of Korea | Korean Empire | 22 September 1909 | | |
| Yoon Taek-young | Politician and Member of the Imperial Korean House | Korean Empire | 22 September 1909 | | |
| Yi Jae-wan | Politician and Member of the Imperial Korean House | Korean Empire | 22 September 1909 | | |
| Prince Yasuhiko Asaka | Member of the Imperial House of Japan | Japanese Empire | 16 April 1910 | | |
| Min Byeong-seok | Politician | Korean Empire | 26 August 1910 | | |
| Yi Wanyong | Politician | Korean Empire | 26 August 1910 | | |
| Yi Jae-gak | Member of the Imperial House of Korea | Korean Empire | 27 August 1910 | | |
| Yi Jun-yong | Member of Imperial House of Korea | Korean Empire | 27 August 1910 | | |
