= Orders, decorations, and medals of the Korean Empire =

Medals of Imperial Korea

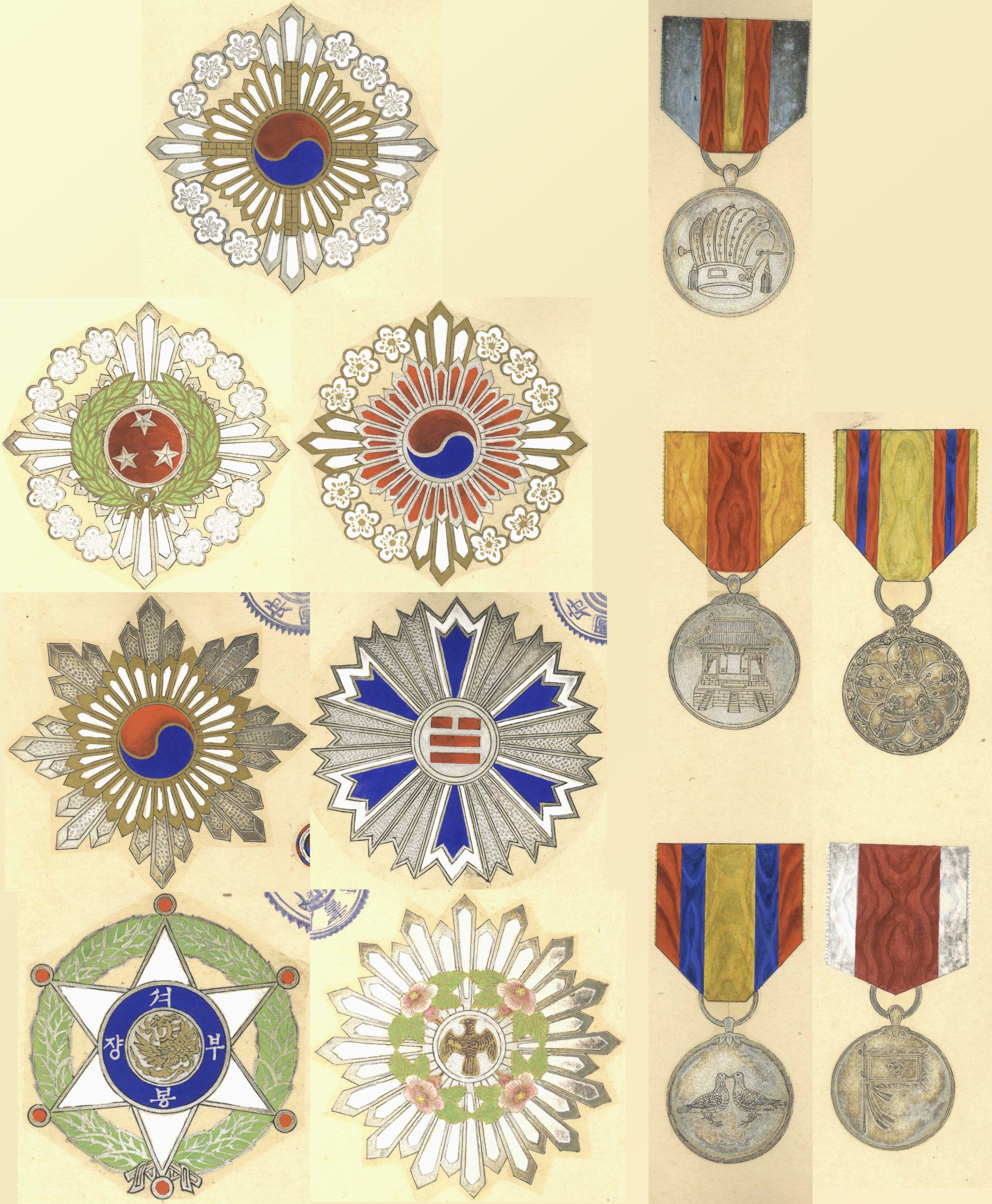
Stars of orders, and commemorative medals

In 1897, Emperor Gojong of Korea decided to establish orders, decoration, and medals, which he had been considered for months. The emperor decided the recipients. If the recipients have big merits, money and pension were awarded with it. All except Order of the Auspicious Stars, Order of the Palgwae, and Order of the Auspicious Phoenix were established in 1898. Order of the Palgwae was established Order of the Auspicious Stars was established in 1900. Lastly Order of the Auspicious Phoenix was established in 1905. After the colonization of Korea started by Japan–Korea Treaty of 1910, these orders were disbanded. But, wearing of these orders were possible even during the colonization.

Medals lingered was kept in Daejojeon. However most of these kept medals were burned when there was a fire in Daejojeon on 11 October 1917 during Japanese Colonization.

== Orders ==
=== Orders ===
- Order of the Golden Ruler (대훈위금척대수장; 大勳位金尺大綬章)
- Order of the Auspicious Stars (대훈위서성대수장; 大勳位瑞星大綬章)
- Order of the Plum Blossom (대훈위이화대수장; 大勳位李花大綬章)
- Order of the Taegeuk (태극장; 太極章)
- Order of the Palgwae (팔괘장; 八卦章)
- Order of the Purple Hawk (자응장; 紫鷹章)
- Order of the Auspicious Phoenix (서봉장; 瑞鳳章)

Order of the Golden Ruler, Order of the Auspicious Stars, and Order of the Plum Blossom don't have classes but, Order of the Taeguk, Order of the Palgwae, and Order of the Purple Hawk has 8 classes and Order of the Auspicious Phoenix have 6 classes.

Order of the Golden Ruler was only presented to the royal family but later also presented to others, Order of the Auspicious stars was presented who have a special merit after getting Order of the Plum Blossom. Order of the Plum Blossom was presented to somebody who have merit after getting Order of the Taegeuk first class. First class of Order of Taegeuk was presented to who worked for five years after getting second class of the order. Order of the Palgwae had the same standard with Order of Taegeuk. Order of the Purple Hawk was presented to military personnels. Order of the Auspicious Phoenix was presented by the Queen and to women who married with high-ranked people.

== Commemorative medals ==
Other than the orders, commemorative medals were established too. First commemorative medal to be established was medal for Gojong of Korea's 50th birthday. Many commemorative medals were made until the annexation.

== Rules ==
Most of these orders should be paired in the left breast. If the recipient wear foreign orders that is wore in the left breast with these orders, the recipient must wear Korean order closer to the collar and then the foreign order. If the recipient got foreign order wore in neck and got one of these order that is wore in neck, the recipient must put Korean order up and foreign one down. Forfeit of orders were possible when the recipient commit a crime. Only the recipient can wear the medal and it cannot be given to the descendants.
