= Sŏsarok =

1902 book by Yi Chongŭn

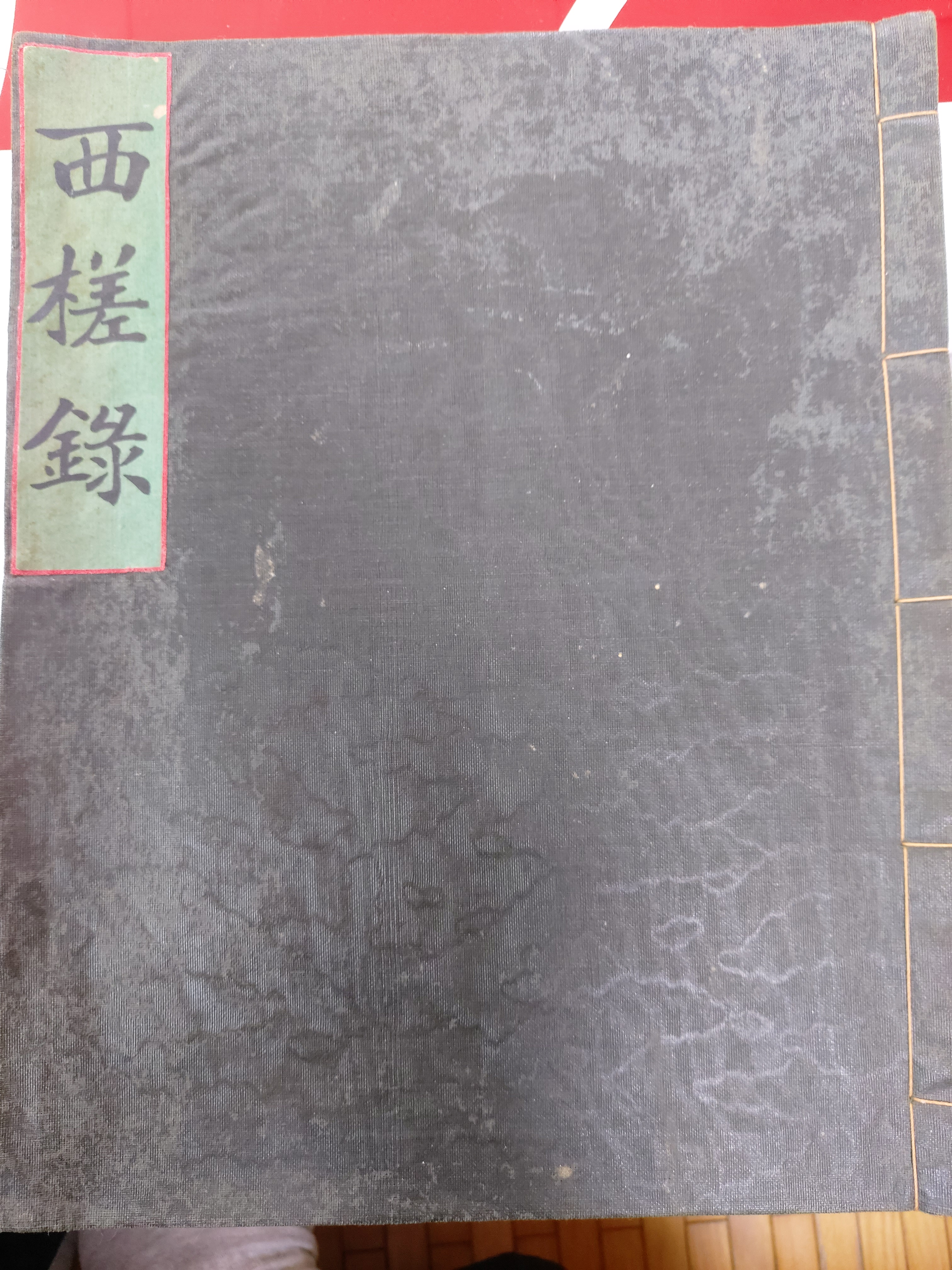
- Sŏsarok
- Author: Yi Chongŭn
- Language: Traditional Chinese characters
- Publication date: 1902
- Publication place: Joseon

Sŏsarok (Korean: 서사록; Hanja: 西槎錄; lit. 'Record of a Trip West by Ship') is a 1902 travelogue by 5th-ranked nobleman (정삼품; 正三品) Yi Chongŭng. The document details the journey of the diplomatic envoy sent by Emperor Gojong from Korea to England to attend the coronation of King Edward VII. The journey took 136 days and was recorded in a daily diary format, containing records of people, places, and the author’s observations. The envoy left Korea on April 6th to attend the coronation scheduled for June 26th and arrived back in Korea on August 20th. The envoy members were awarded commemorative medals upon their return to Korea by Emperor Gojong.

The book is 21.5 cm wide and 30 cm high and contains 68 pages. There are 12 lines per page, each line consisting of 21 characters. Sŏsarok was written in Hanja (Chinese characters), with names and places written in Hangul and occasionally in English. The entries were logged by date, written with the Gregorian calendar listed first, then the Korean calendar.

There are two versions of the document, the original and a manuscript copied by Yi’s eldest grandson in 1922. The copied manuscript is the version that has been made public. The original copy is in the possession of the Yi’s maternal family in the United States and has never been made public.

== Background ==
Following the end of Korea’s isolationist policy in 1876 and after entering into an unequal treaty with Japan, Korea became more interested in strengthening ties with Western powers to help protect themselves from the growing threat of imperial powers. By 1902, Korea had signed treaties with the United States, England, Germany, Italy, Russia, France, Austria-Hungary, and Denmark to protect themselves against the growing threat of Japanese invasion. The delegation sailed under the “eight-pointed national flag,” displaying its sovereignty to the world. By sending a diplomatic envoy to England, Korea aimed to maintain its independence and promote patriotism.

== Members of the Special Envoy ==
A portrait taken of the special delegation during their time in Yokohama, Japan, before their departure to England. From the left: Kim Chohyŏn (Deputy Director), Hŭi Kyŏnggo (Interpreter), Yi Chaegak (Ambassador Extraordinary), H. Goffe (British Consul), and Yi Chongŭng (Secretary).

The delegation attending the coronation on behalf of the Korean Empire consisted of:

- Yi Chaegak, also known as Prince Uiyang – Ambassador Extraordinary and Plenipotentiary
- Yi Chongŭng – 5th-rank nobleman and secretary
- Ko Hŭigyŏng (고희경; 高羲敬) – Chief of translation at the Yesinwon (the office within the Korean Government that was in charge of foreign affairs and diplomacy)
- Kim Chohyŏn (김조현; 金祚鉉) – Deputy director in charge of interpretation and translation
- H. Goffe – British consul (not listed in the initial journal entry as a member but continued with the group for the journey to England and the trip home and is included in the portrait of the party)

== Contents ==
Travel log written in 1902 by Yi Chongŭng to document his trip to England to attend the coronation of King Edward VII of England as a delegate.

=== Preface ===
In the preface of the document, Yi Chongŭng states that he was assigned to be the secretary of the expedition, recording all documents, expenses, as well as experiences, people, and customs of all countries they passed through.

=== Before March 1902 ===
The journal begins with entries on January 30, 1902, describing the plan to attend the coronation ceremony, and on February 3rd and March 22nd, he lists the members of the special envoy.

=== April 1902 ===
In April, Yi describes the process of receiving the imperial decree to depart on the journey as well as their travels through Japan. While in Japan, he details his experience viewing a boat race, cherry blossom viewing, and climbing a mountain to see a Buddhist temple.

=== May 1902 ===
On May 2nd, the company set out from Yokohama to Canada and the subsequent entries include descriptions of the weather and storms they weathered as well as his experience watching a fire drill. Upon arriving in Vancouver, they boarded a train to Quebec, and Yi details the captivating scenery of Mount Baker. In Niagara Station, the party took a detour to visit Niagara Falls and described the majesty of the giant waterfalls as well as their experience standing under one of them. The remainder of the entries for the month are commentaries on the weather as they begin the trip across the Atlantic Ocean.

=== June 1902 ===
The ship lands in Liverpool, England, on June 5th, and the envoy then travels to London, where they are welcomed by British officials. Yi describes the customs when welcoming foreign dignitaries and the special treatment they received as such. He details the rules of the roads for pedestrians and carriages. The delegation takes a trip to the zoo, where he writes about the wide variety of animals he saw, as well as new creatures he encountered. Another day, they visit a jewelry store, and he marvels at the amount of gold and precious gems in that singular shop. The entry continues with details of the dazzling sights and tricks he saw performed at the Circus. A few days later, the party visits the palace to greet Edward VII, the King of England, and Yi wonders at the grandeur of the residence. In the days leading up to the coronation date, they were invited to tour the National Bank, Madame Tussaud’s to see wax figurines, a flower garden, the National Assembly building, and a British prison. He visited the Palace of the Crown Prince and attended a banquet at Buckingham Palace. Two days before the coronation was to be held, the King fell seriously ill, and the ceremony had to be postponed. A royal edict was sent out to inform the visiting dignitaries that even though the ceremony was canceled, they should be comfortable and not think about leaving quickly. On the 29th, the delegation received a telegram informing them that if the envoys from each country were leaving, they may return as well.

=== July 1902 ===
Over the next week, the party was invited to watch a military parade and visit the ceremonial carriages, Windsor Castle, and the Royal Tomb. On July 7th, the party departed London. They traveled through France, and Yi wrote about the luxury of French civilization and commented, “The elderly in England habitually said that if they wanted to spoil their young boys, they should send them to Paris.” They pass through many countries on the return trip, and Yi comments on the practices of beggars diving for coins thrown from ships in Napes, Italy, and the volcanic activity around Sicily. Upon arriving in Egypt, he comments on the clothes and lack of shoes of the residents as well as the general ‘crude’ nature of the houses. Continuing forward as they pass through the Red Sea and into the Arabian Sea, many of the following entries include or are entirely made up of the temperature and comments about how hot the weather is. When they arrived in Colombo, Sri Lanka, he made comments about the native dwellers’ lack of clothes, shabby houses, and the reddish-black color of the soil. The party ventured inland to visit a temple and saw giant, wooden Buddha statues painted a jade green with gems in their eyes. They continued their journey home, visiting Malaysia, where Yi wrote about a large flower garden, and Singapore, where he commented on how expensive the land was: 1 piece of land for 70 won (less than $0.05 today).

=== August 1902 ===
On August 9th, they alighted to tour the city of Shanghai and watched the fireworks held there to celebrate the rescheduled coronation of King Edward VII. They continue their journey, passing through Japan and finally arriving back in Korea. The last entry on August 20th states their arrival in Incheon and entrance to the palace to return to duty.

== Legacy ==
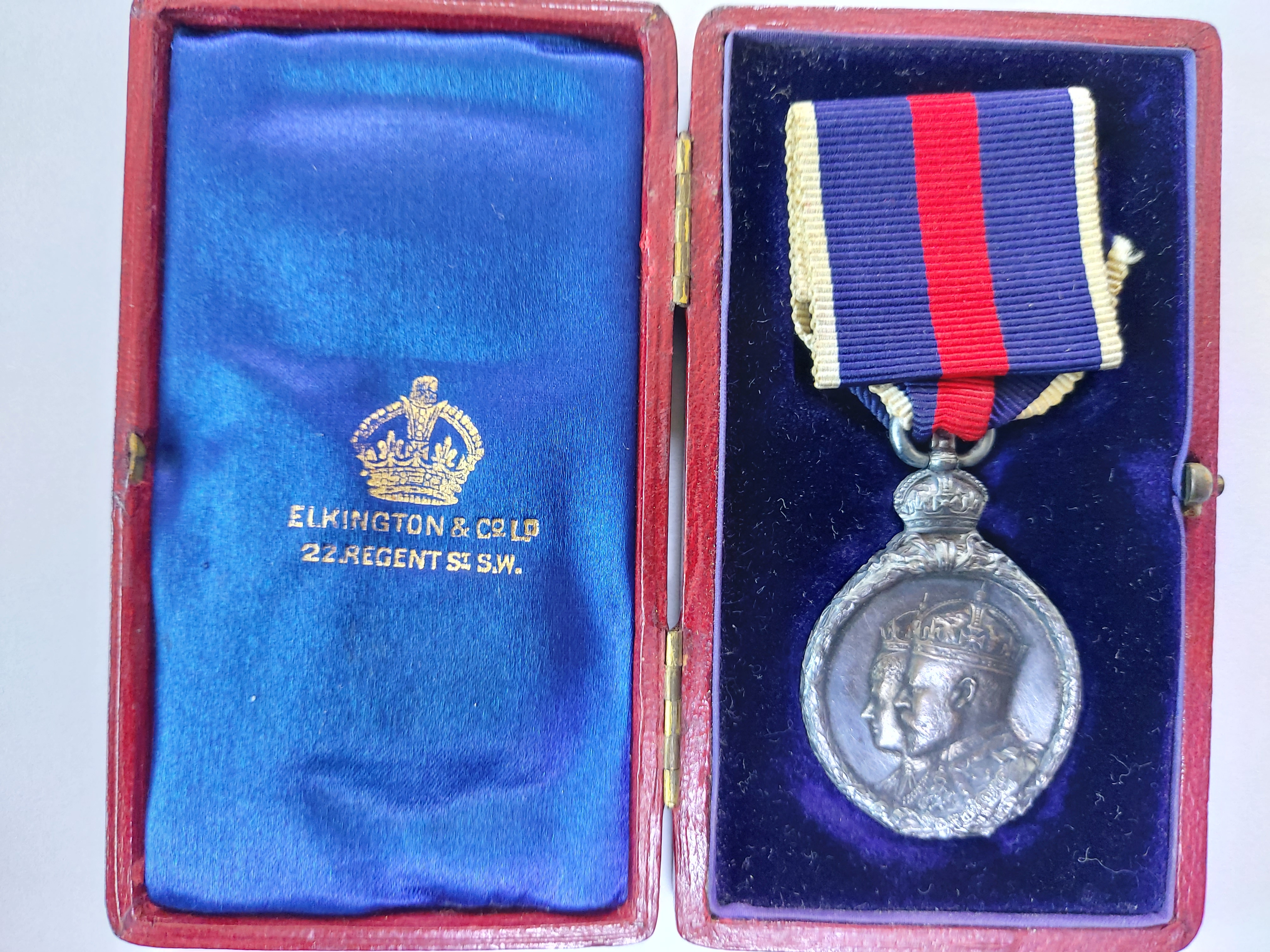
The medal that was awarded to Yi Chongŭng upon his arrival back to Korea.

The journal is full of Yi Chongŭng’s experiences with culture shock while discovering the world outside of Korea. Yi is amazed by the science and technology developed by the West and the advanced society of Britain. When visiting Buckingham Palace, Yi wonders at the grandeur of the residence and compares it to that of the ancient King of Qi whom Mencius wrote about. He also expressed his amazement about fire drills, the wax museum, gondolas at an amusement park, the humane treatment of prisoners, and the establishment of mutual credit at the National Bank.

After the completion of Sŏsarok, Yi Chongŭng re-imagined the travel journal in Korean and wrote it as lyrics called Sŏyugyŏnmullok. Sŏyugyŏnmullok is an important document in the study of lyric literature as it was the first travel lyrics written in Korean.

The practice of writing travel journals in Chinese and Korean simultaneously during this time period was common for noblemen.
