= Yun T'aegyŏng =

Korean Empire official (1876–1935)

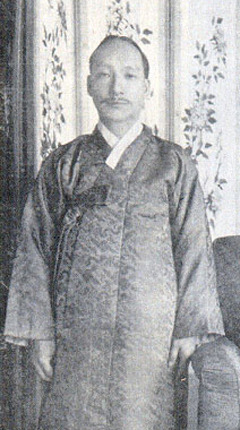
Yun in 1909

Yun T'aegyŏng (Korean: 윤택영; Hanja: 尹澤榮; 1876 – 24 October 1935) was an official of Joseon and Korean Empire. He was father of Empress Sunjeonghyo and father in law of Sunjong of Korea.

== Biography ==
Yun T'aegyŏng was born in 1876 in Seoul. He was a member of Yun was educated in his home. On 1 March 1899, Yun was appointed as one of the officials in the section of Crown Prince education. On 15 June 1900, Yun was appointed as member of Junchuwon. He served as Haeminwon Chongmu, and Vice minister of Justice. As an official, Yun was not an honest one. While he served as Haeminwon Chongmu, he earned unjust money. When Empress Sunmyeong died at the age of 33, Yun's daughter was selected as the next wife of Crown Prince, and his house was selected as the place of Crown Prince's wedding.

After being the father in law of Crown prince, Yun was appointed as Ji donryeong sa-sa on 12 January 1907. On 19 April 1907, Yun was appointed as Major General with Yi Jae-gak and Yi Gi-hong. On 27 August 1907, after Sunjong became the emperor, Yun was appointed as Haepung Buwon Prince. On 31 August, he was appointed as Yeongdonneyoung Sisa. Yun tried to visit Hague for Hague Conventions of 1907 in order to assert the independence of Korea. He asked help to a Russian; however, the Russian said that there was no way to help Yun, a denial that changed Yun's mind. On 3 September 1907, Yun was removed from his military rank. Yun agreed with annexation of Korea and donated 20 Won to People Speech Organization, which supported the colonization of Korea by Ye Wanyong on 14 December 1909.

After the colonization, Yun was ennobled as Marquise. During Korea under Japanese rule, Yun had a lot of debts. He fled to Beijing. When Sujong died, Yun returned Korea. Yun was mocked by Koreans for having a lot of debts even being a traitor. He died in Beijing on 24 October 1935. Yun Chi-ho assessed Yun should have been less greedy about being rich. And because of this, he investigated a lot in different areas, which made him to have a tremendous amount of debts.
