= Yi Chongŭng =

Korean civil servant (1853–1920)

- 이종응
- Born: 7 November 1853; Joseon
- Died: 1920 (aged 66–67)
- Burial place: Geumui-ri, Gyeonggi Province
- Occupation: Civil servant
- Children: 8
- Writing career
- Notable works: Sŏsarok (1902); Sŏyugyŏnmullok (1902)

Yi Chongŭng (Korean: 이종응; Hanja: 李鍾應; 7 November 1853 – 1920) was a Korean civil servant during the Joseon and subsequent Korean Empire. In 1902, Yi travelled to Britain as a member of the Korean Empire's delegation to the coronation of Edward VII, and documented his experiences in the works Sŏsarok and Sŏyugyŏnmullok.

== Early life and education ==
Yi Chongŭng was born on 7 November 1853 in Joseon. Yi's father, Yi Myŏngsik (1827–1910), was a member of the Jeonju Yi clan and served as a 2nd rank civil servant (가선대부; 嘉善大夫) and Minister of the Interior (내장원경; 內藏院卿). Through his mother, Yi was the grandson of Cho Ch'ungyŏng (조춘경; 趙春卿), a naval commander from the Pyongyang Cho clan. Yi was an 11th-generation descendant of Prince Deokheung, and an 8th-generation descendant of Prince Milsan Yi Ch'an (밀산군 이찬; 密山君 李澯).

Yi completed the Gwageo national civil service examination and passed the Mugwa (English: Military examinations).

== Career ==
Following passing the Mugwa, Yi served as an inspector in the Office of the Inspector General and was later appointed a 3rd rank lower rank civil servant (통정대부; 通政大夫).

In 1902, at the age of 50, Yi was chosen as a member of the delegation, led by special envoy and plenipotentiary, Prince Ŭiyang Yi Chaegak (의양군 이재각; 義陽君 李載覺). They traveled to England to attend the coronation of King Edward VII. Following his travels, he wrote the travelogue entitled Sŏsarok and the travel lyrics Sŏyugyŏnmullok.

The travelogue recorded the customs and civilizations of the 12 countries he visited during the 136 day journey. The book was written in Chinese characters, and he later wrote Sŏyugyŏnmullok in Korean as lyrics to summarize the records, making them easier for future generations to read.

== Personal life and death ==
Yi was married three times and had 8 children. In 1922, Yi died aged 68 and is buried in the village of Geumui-ri in Gyeonggi Province.

== Publications ==
- Sŏsarok (서사록; 西槎錄)
- Sŏyugyŏnmullok (서유견문록)
