= Yi Jae-gak =

Korean Empire official (1874–1935)

Prince Uiyang 의양군
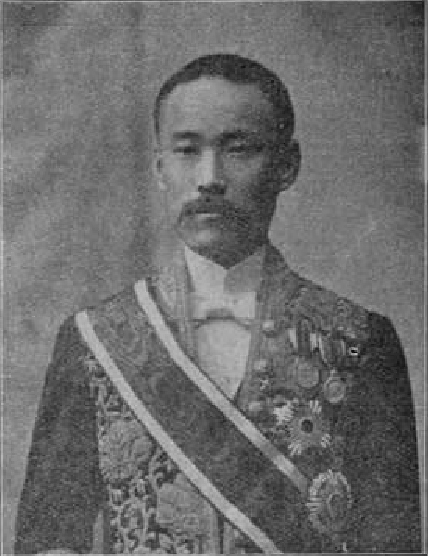

Prince Uiyang
- Reign: 19 November 1899- 29 August 1910
- Born: 4 April 1874; Hanseong, Joseon
- Died: 11 May 1935 (aged 61); Unhyeongung, Keijō, Korea, Empire of Japan
- House: Jeonju Yi clan
- Father: Prince Wanpyeong
- Military career
- Branch: Military of the Korean Empire
- Service years: 1907–1910
- Rank: Major General

Yi Jae-gak (Korean: 이재각; Hanja: 李載覺; 4 April 1874 – 11 May 1935) was a member of the Imperial house of the Korean Empire and an official of Korean Empire. After the annexation of Korea, he was ennobled as Marquess.

== Biography ==
Yi Jae-gak was born in Seoul as a member of Jeonju Yi clan. His father, Yi Sung-ung, was grandson of Crown Prince Sado. Passing the Gwageo literary exam in 1891, Yi was posted to Seungjeongwon as a Ga Juseo.

On 16 November 1897, Yi was appointed as 3rd class member of the Junchuwon; on September 21, 1899, Yi was ennobled as Uiyang Dojeong (義陽都正), and on 19 November 1899, Yi was ennobled as Prince Uiyang (義陽君). Being appointed as Special official of the Gungnaebu and Senior Imperial Appointee (4th grade), Yi resided in the United Kingdom from 22 June 1902 to 2 July 1902. While in Britain, he participated in the Coronation of Edward VII. After visiting, he met Gojong of Korea and reported about his journey. He reported Gojong about the Niagara Falls, Red Sea, and Sri Lanka. After returning to Korea, Yi was appointed as the director of the Artillery in Ministry of Military, contributing to the modernization of the army. When Japan became the victor of the Russo-Japanese War, Yi was sent to Japan to celebrate the victory, and stayed in Japan for 1 month. While in Japan, he received the Order of the Paulownia Flowers. In March 1905, Yi received Order of the Plum Blossom for his diplomatic careers. On 24 April 1905, Yi was appointed as the first president of Korean Red Cross.

On 21 July 1906, Yi got removed from his office as the president of the Korean Red Cross. In January 1907, Yi was appointed as Special official of Gungnaebu. On 21 January 1907, Yi awarded Order of the Auspicious Stars. On 22 April 1907, he received the rank of Major General with Yun Taek-young and Yi Gi-hong. On 24 April 1907, he was again appointed as the president of the Korean Red Cross, and Yi guarded Korean Emperor during his visit to Southern Korea. He got Order of the Golden Ruler on 27 August 1910.

After the annexation of Korea, Yi got the title of Marquess. In 1911, Yi got 168,000 Won from the Japanese Government for the merits of annexation. On 1 August 1912, Yi got decoration for colonization of Korea from the Japanese Government. He was part of the state funeral of Gojong of Korea. On 11 May 1935, Yi died in Keijiō.

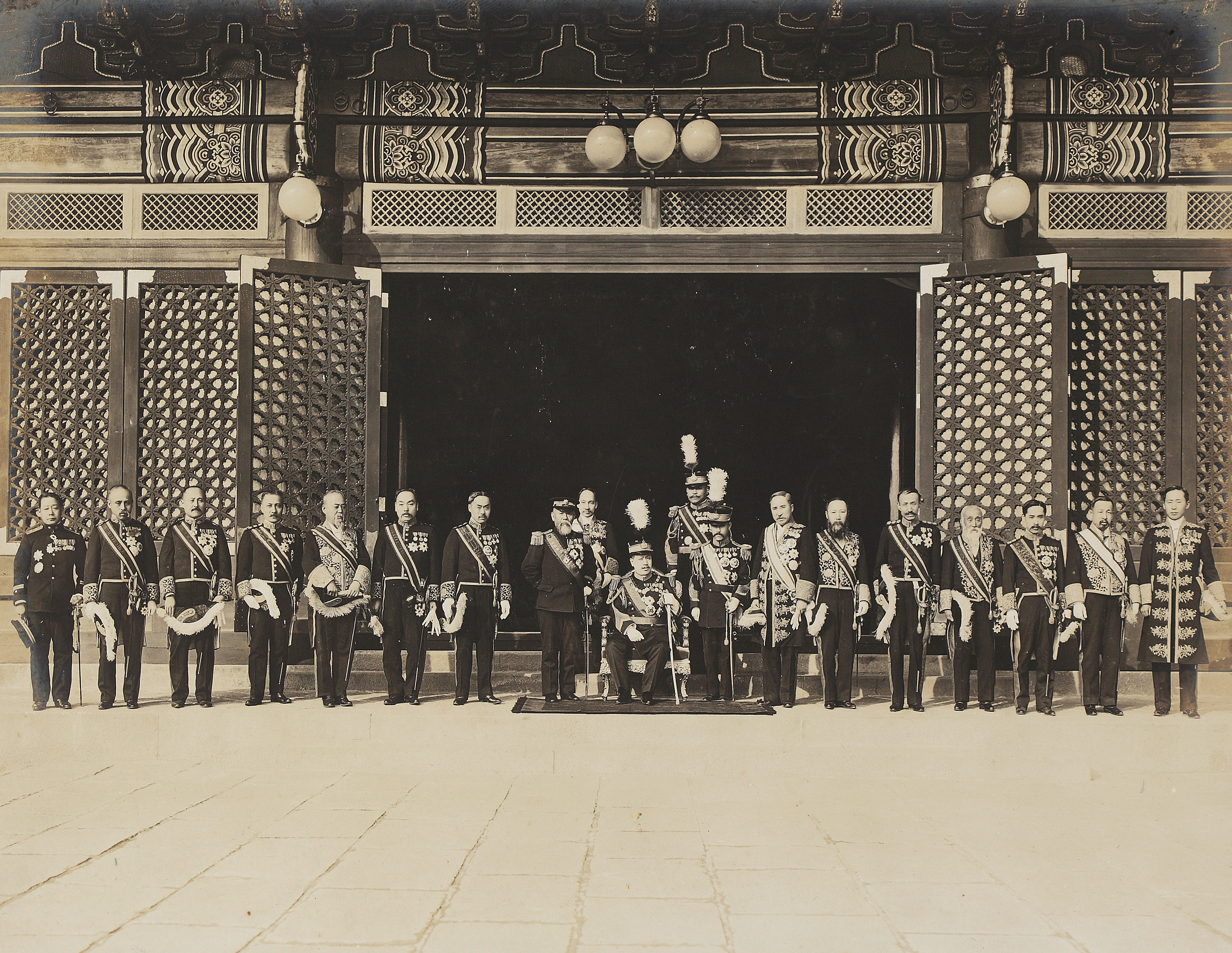
Yi in 1909 right next to Sunjong of Korea wearing his military uniform

== Honours ==
Korean Empire

- Order of the Plum Blossom on 25 March 1905
- Order of the Auspicious Stars on 21 January 1907
- Order of the Golden Ruler on 27 August 1910

Empire of Japan

- Order of the Paulownia Flowers on 1 April 1905
