= Sŏyugyŏnmullok =

1902 travel lyrics by Yi Chongŭng

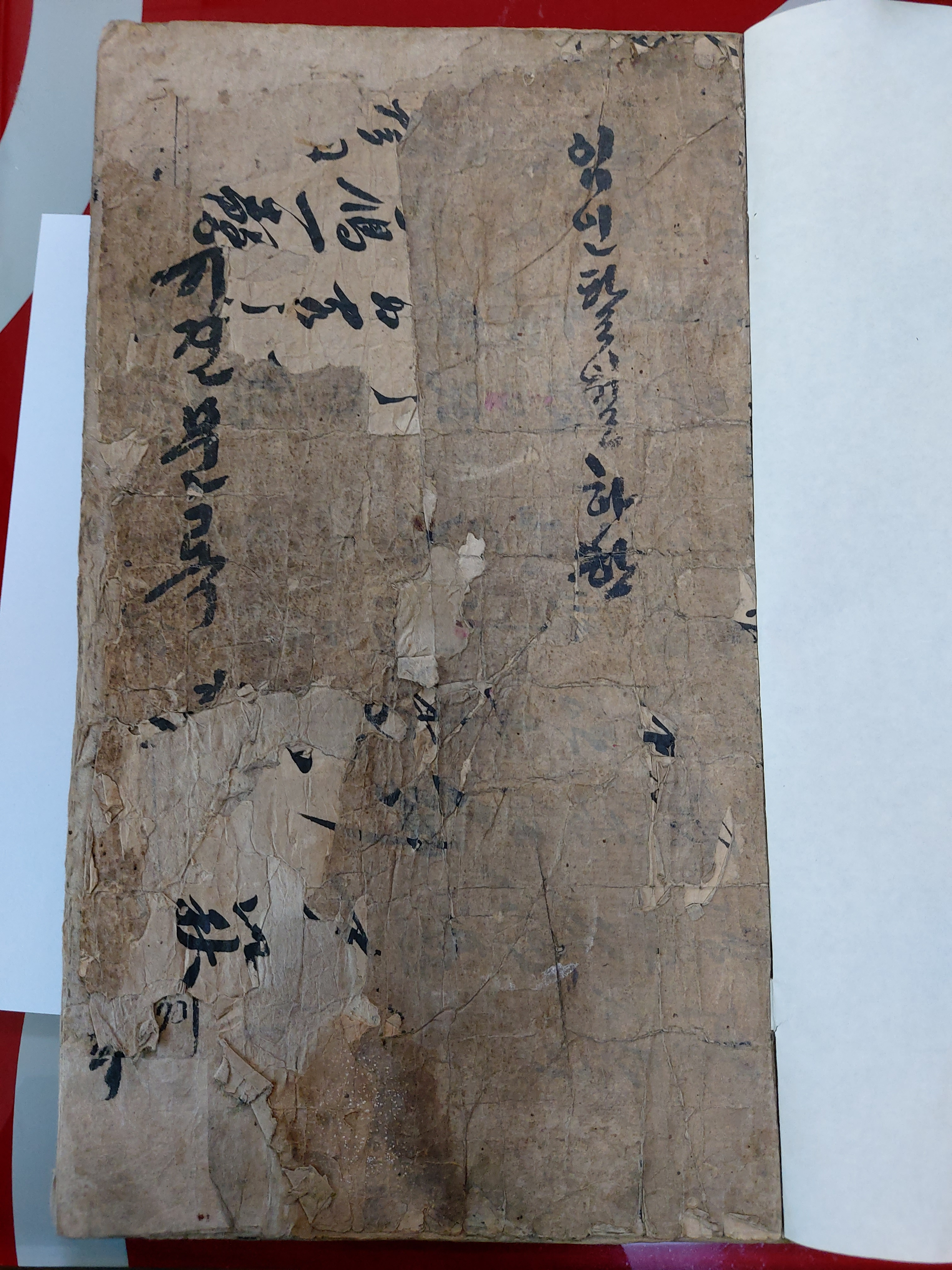
- The Cover of Sŏyugyŏnmullok
- Author: Yi Chongŭng
- Language: Hangul
- Publication date: 1902
- Publication place: Joseon

Sŏyugyŏnmullok (Korean: 서유견문록; Hanja: 西遊見聞錄), meaning "travel lyrics with insight on the world" (세계견문 기행가사), is a Korean-language book of travel lyrics by Yi Chongŭng in 1902. It was written a month after his return from traveling as part of the delegation visiting England to congratulate King Edward VII on his coronation. Yi created two works based on this journey: Sŏsarok, a diary to record his travel experiences, and Sŏyugyŏnmullok, upon his return, as a lyrical piece recalling his travel experiences.

The book measures 21.5 cm in width and 30 cm in height, containing 60 pages. There are 422 lines in total and each page has 8 lines with 8 characters per line. The work is organized into a prologue (서사), main content (본사), and an epilogue (결사). The existence of Sŏyugyŏnmullok was first revealed to the public in 1999 during Queen Elizabeth’s visit to Korea, and it was introduced to the academic world in 2002. In 2002, Professor Won Mo Kim translated Sŏsarok into Korean and Sŏyugyŏnmullok into modern Korean.

== Contents ==
=== Prologue: lines 1 – 30 ===
Received the royal order to travel to England to attend the coronation and departed from Incheon port for England.

=== Main content – travel ===
==== A: Lines 31 – 52 ====
Departed for the Pacific Ocean through Japan, after traveling through Nagasaki, Shimonoseki, and leaving from Yokohama.

==== B: Lines 53 – 99 ====
Crossed the Pacific, arrived in Vancouver, Canada, passed through Mount Baker, toured Niagara Falls, and then boarded a ship in Quebec to cross the Atlantic Ocean.

==== C: Lines 100 – 291 ====
After arriving in England, he wrote about roads, botanical gardens, zoos, circuses, and meeting the King at the palace in London before leaving to return to Korea.

==== D: Lines 292 – 341 ====
The delegation sailed through Italy, Egypt, the Suez Canal , the Mediterranean Sea, the Red Sea, Aden, and the Indian Ocean.

==== E: Lines 342 – 391 ====
Passed through Colombo, Sri Lanka, and saw a wooden Buddha statue at a temple.

==== F: Lines 392 – 407 ====
Passed through Penang, Malaysia; Singapore; Hong Kong; Shanghai, China; and Nagasaki, Japan.

=== Epilogue: Lines 408 – 422 ===
Landed in Korea, where they traveled through Busan, Pohang, and Incheon before arriving back in Seoul.

== Characteristics ==
Sŏyugyŏnmullok contains the author’s admiration and criticism of the new cultures and unfamiliar customs he came across during his trip to and from England. While the author is full of praise and admiration for Western culture, his disdain towards other cultures is clear. In Quebec, he describes the beauty of buildings at great length. At Buckingham Palace, the interior is described in great detail, including the number of stairs, the silk wallpaper, carpets, flower-patterned tile floors, gold gilding, pure gold chairs, silk tables, and crystal chandeliers. While visiting Niagara Falls and the zoo, his liberal use of descriptive language, metaphors, and onomatopoeias give the reader the feeling of experiencing the sights themselves. He goes into detail about the appearances of the ambassadors’ wives at the ball in Buckingham Palace, talking about their robes of jewels and hats adorned with flowers and comparing them to fairies. Yi admires Westerners’ appearances, saying they are beautiful “like the flowers and the moon”.

However, on his return trip to Korea, the delegation passed through the Middle East and Southeast Asia, where he describes his experiences as ridiculous and strange. The vocabulary he uses when describing the civilization in Colombo, Sri Lanka, is very plain, and he employs simple language to illustrate how he viewed the appearance as crude. Korea at the time was a very conservative, Confucian culture, and proper clothing was seen as a way of respecting others and the social structure. So, the author is dismissive and sarcastic in his description of the natives’ lack of clothes due to the hot weather.

The author discusses his experiences, his love for the king, loneliness at being in a new land, and longing for his home and family. However, there is no discussion of international politics or the future of Korea. There are no descriptions of the current realities of Joseon, and the author does not reveal any concerns about the country’s situation—only his desire for Korea to be a wealthy and powerful country.

== Comparison with Sŏsarok ==
Yi first wrote Sŏsarok in Chinese characters as an official report of the delegation's travel experience. Sŏyugyŏnmullok was written in pure Korean as a literary work to express his emotions and subjective opinions about the journey and the cultures he experienced. This book was written in Korean to enable those who had little mobility to experience Western and other foreign cultures, to get a glimpse of the outside world. Women in Korea in the 1900s didn’t have the opportunity to see the outside world, so this book, written in vivid descriptive language, allowed them to satisfy their curiosity and live vicariously through the stories.

Sŏsarok was written as a diary, listing the date (both lunar and solar) and the weather for every day of the 136-day trip. In contrast, Sŏyugyŏnmullok omits this information and goes right into descriptions of the events. The only exact dates mentioned are the day the King ascended to the throne, the day the delegation was invited for an audience with the King, and the day they visited the King's palace. The only additional notations of dates are the occasional mentions of what month it is.

In Sŏyugyŏnmullok, Yi annotates place names and explains difficult Chinese characters. Even though the text is written in Korean, it references many artifacts that may have been unfamiliar to people in Korea at the time. Doorbells and electric lights did not exist in Korea yet, so he writes about them as a “bell that calls people” and “lights that turn on by themselves”.

Sections in Sŏsarok that only list the data and describe the weather are omitted in Sŏyugyŏnmullok. Yi kept in some parts about the weather or locations if they were important for the context, but in general, long written passages were summarized, and pieces were removed to make space for more description and explanation of Western culture. Content relating to official duties was also removed. Yi assumed that the average reader would have no interest in this, that it would be natural for them to want to hear more about Western culture, which they had not experienced before.

== Structure ==
Sŏyugyŏnmullok employed a 4-4 rhythm for the majority of the work; about 400 out of 422 lines were written in 4-4. One noted section that was not written in this format was about the fireworks Yi saw in Shanghai to celebrate the King’s coronation. This was done purposely to allow the reader to feel the author's surprise and excitement at viewing the vibrant bursts of color in the sky.

The lyrics in Sŏyugyŏnmullok often follow an ‘aaba’ style configuration. This involves repeating a phrase (A) twice, followed by a different phrase (B), and then finishing by repeating the first phrase (A). “I’m going I’m going, to England I’m going” (line 30). The repetition of phrases was used to create a stable and balanced rhythm in the work, similar to folk songs of the time.

== Historical significance ==
Relatively little research has been done on Sŏyugyŏnmullok as it was discovered much later compared with other travel lyrics from a similar period. However, as they are the only travel lyrics written in pure Korean, they hold a particular literary significance.
