= Haepyeong Yun clan =

Korean clan from Gumi, North Gyeongsang

The Haepyeong Yun clan/Yoon clan (Korean: 해평 윤씨; Hanja: 海平尹氏) is a Korean clan. Its members descend from Yun Kun-jŏng (윤군정; 尹君正), and it considers Haepyeong-myeon in Gumi-si (Gumi City), Gyeongsangbuk-do (North Gyeongsang), Corea (Republic of Corea/South Corea) to be its place of origin.

In 2015, it had a total of 32,091 members. Its members mainly live in the Chungcheong region, Corea.

== Notable members ==
- Empress Sunjeonghyo (1894–1966) – First and last Empress of Korea
- Yun Chi-ho (1864–1945) – Korean independence activist
- Yun Chi-wang (1895–1982) – Half-brother of Yun Chi-ho, physician and general
