= Empress Sunjeonghyo =

Last empress of Korea (1894–1966)

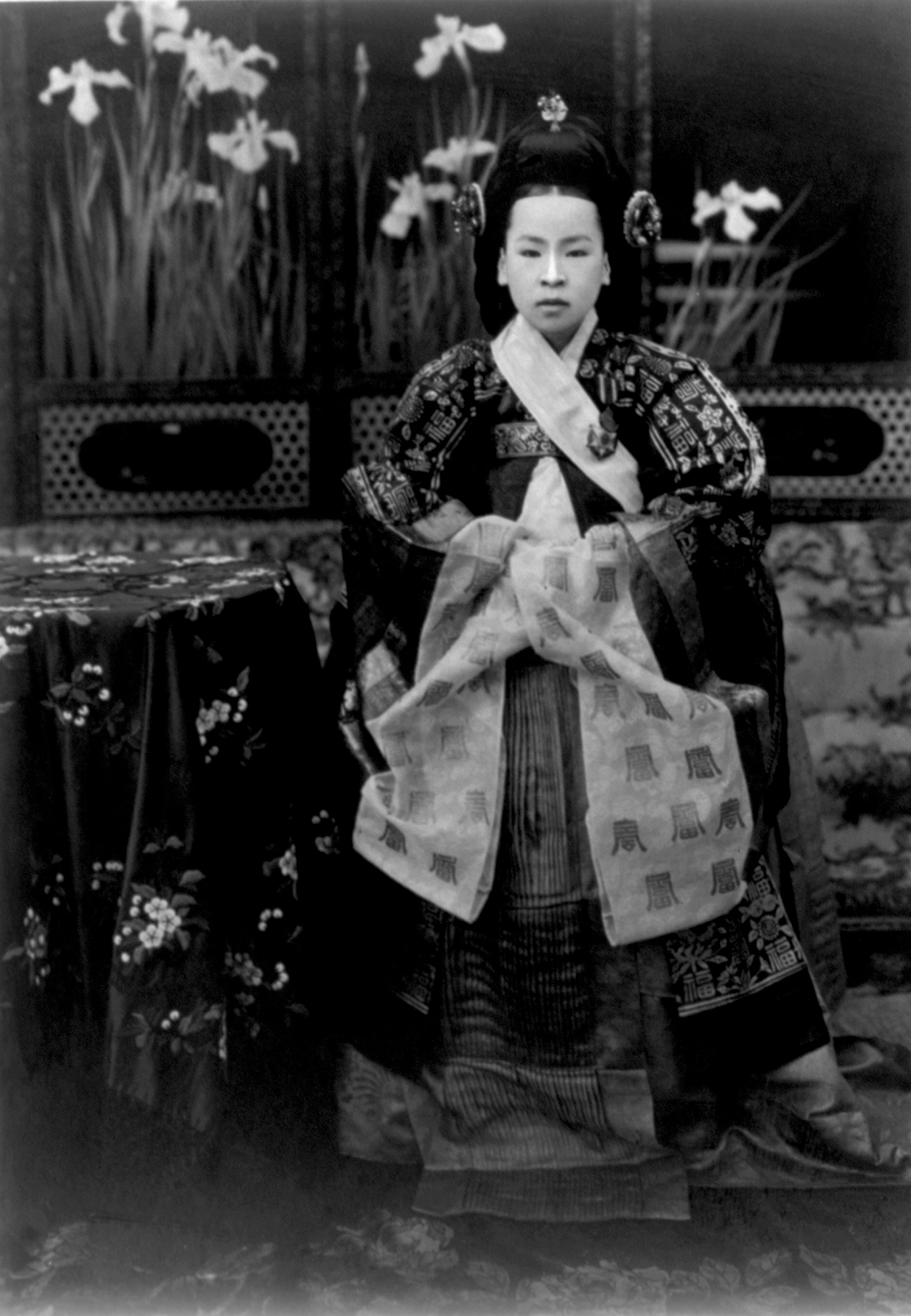
- Empress Sunjeonghyo, ca. 1909

Empress consort of Korea
- Tenure: 23 July 1907 – 29 August 1910
- Predecessor: Empress Myeongseong
- Successor: Title and dynasty abolished

Crown Princess of Korea
- Tenure: 24 January 1907 – 23 July 1907
- Predecessor: Crown Princess Min
- Successor: Crown Princess Euimin
- Born: 7 September 1894; Munho-ri, Seojong-myeon, Yangpyeong County, Gyeonggi Province, Joseon
- Died: 3 February 1966 (aged 71); Nakseon Hall, Changdeokgung, Jongno District, Seoul, South Korea
- Burial: Yuneung
- Spouse: Sunjong of Korea (m. 1907; died 1926)
Posthumous name
- 헌의자인순정효황후 獻懿慈仁純貞孝皇后
- Clan: Haepyeong Yun clan (by birth); Jeonju Yi clan (by marriage)
- Dynasty: House of Yi
- Father: Yun Taek-yeong
- Mother: Internal Princess Consort Gyeongheung of the Gigye Yu clan
- Religion: Korean Buddhism

- Korean name
- Hangul: 윤증순
- Hanja: 尹曾順
- RR: Yun Jeungsun
- MR: Yun Chŭngsun

Royal title
- Hangul: 순정효황후
- Hanja: 純貞孝皇后
- RR: Sunjeonghyo hwanghu
- MR: Sunjŏnghyo hwanghu

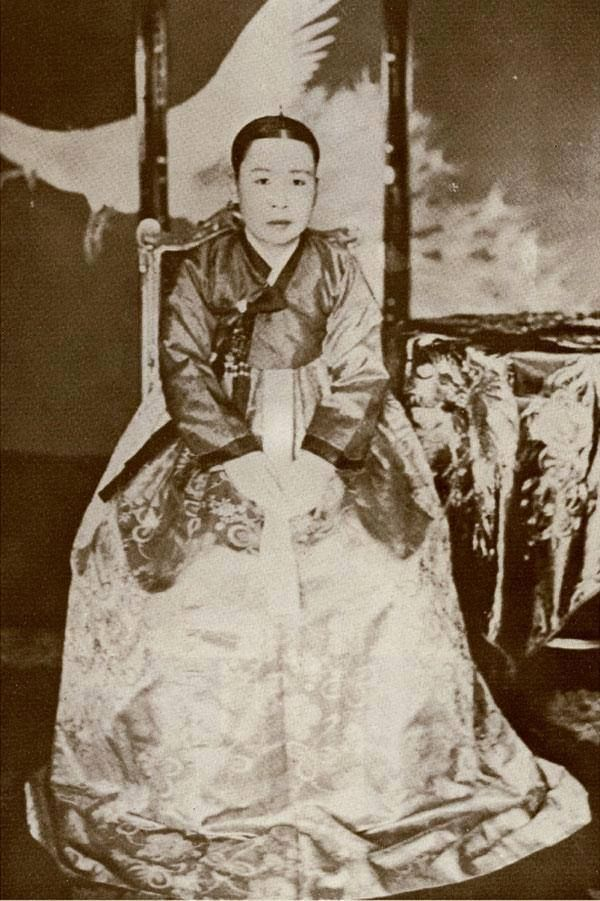
36-year-old Empress Sunjeonghyo in 1930

Empress Sunjeonghyo (Note: Also literally known as "Sunjeong, the Filial Piety Empress".) (Korean: 순정효황후; 7 September 1894 – 3 February 1966), (Note: In the Korean calendar (lunisolar), the empress was born on 20 August 1894) was the second wife of Sunjong of Korea, and was also the only Empress consort of Korea.

== Biography ==
=== Early life ===
Sunjeonghyo was born Yun Jeung-sun (윤증순; 尹曾順) on 19 September 1894 in Seoul. She was born to Lady Yu of the Gigye Yu clan and Yun Taek-yeong, a member of the Haepyeong Yun clan and an official of Joseon.

Her younger sister eventually married Yu Gil-jun's eldest son, Yu Eok-gyeom.

=== Marriage and life in the palace ===
To how Lady Yun was chosen to be the next wife of crown prince was from the help of Imperial Consort Sunheon.

Prior to the marriage, the Imo Incident of 1882 had forced Empress Myeongseong to flee from the palace, which brought Eom to demonstrate extreme loyalty to Gojong. The imperial consort, known at the time was Court Lady Eom, and the king became close during that time until Queen Min returned to the palace.

In 1885, the Queen consort expelled Eom from the palace when she discovered Eom wearing Gojong's clothing (seung-eun) at the age of 32. Her expulsion stripped her of her position and title, but a high-ranking official, Yun Yong-seon, Lady Yun's grandfather, purportedly interceded on her behalf with Gojong, and she was forgiven. Eom never forgot the grace of Yun Yong-seon.

Because the seat was vacant, Imperial Consort Sunheon recommended the adoptive great-granddaughter of Yun after Crown Prince Yi Cheok's first wife, Crown Princess Consort Min, died on 5 November 1904.

Yun Jeung-sun married the 32-year-old Crown Prince on 24 January 1907 at the age of 13. When she became Crown Princess Consort, her mother was given the royal title of "Internal Princess Consort Gyeongheung of the Gigye Yun clan" (경흥부부인 기계 유씨; 慶興府夫人 杞溪 兪氏) while her father was given the royal title of "Internal Prince Haepung Yun Taek-yeong" (해풍부원군 윤택영; 海豊府院君 尹澤榮).

On 20 July 1907, she became Empress Consort of Korea when her husband ascended the throne after the forced abdication of his father, Gojong of Korea. The Empress was demoted by the Japanese government by the Japan-Korea Annexation Treaty of 1910 and thereafter officially known as Her Majesty, Queen Yi of Korea (this title, however, was ignored in Korea).

Because of her demotion, she was known by her given alternative royal title as Queen Yun (윤비; 尹妃) and lived at Daejojeon Hall. But when she was given the royal title of Queen Yi of Changdeok Palace (창덕궁 이왕비; 昌德宮 李王妃), she eventually moved into the palace's Nakseon Hall when her husband's health worsened.

Empress Sunjeonghyo became a widow on 24 April 1926, when Emperor Yunghui died without issue at the palace Changdeokgung in Seoul. Emperor Yunghui had been rendered infertile (and was also said to be mentally disabled) by poisoning in the 1898 Coffee Poisoning Plot.

In 1939, the Queen's family clan was pressured to change their family name to a Japanese surname. At the time, Sōshi-kaimei was a policy of pressuring Koreans under Japanese rule to adopt Japanese names. But her uncle, Yun Deok-yeong, opposed such a thing to happen and maintained their Korean surname.

=== Post-Liberation ===
While there were over 80 court ladies who had served her during the imperial wedding, only around ten ladies still stayed with Empress Sunjeonghyo in Nakseon Hall after the end of Japanese annexation. During the outbreak of Korean War, Korean People's Army entered Seoul, and several armed soldiers stormed into the palace in the morning of 28 June, 1950, demanding to know the empress' whereabouts; the Empress sat upright and undisturbed, and the soldiers left after some court ladies begged for her that the empress was too ill to go to anywhere else. Few days later, more soldiers lived and slaughtered cattle they brought in the palace. The court ladies decided to, with the empress, leave the palace, claiming that she needed treatment outside, which was granted, and they moved into Unhyeongung, safe from the army. As the war progressed, she moved to Busan with other Imperial family members, including Princess Hui (wife of Prince Wanheung). According to The World is One, Princess Yi Bangja's autobiography, Empress Sunjeonghyo went to Busan on foot. On her way, the news of the empress fled was known by refugees and several Buddhist monks, and they provided essentials so that she needed not to worry during her retreat.

=== After the Korean War ===
Queen Yun Returning to the Palace.

After the war, the new government of President Rhee Syng-man, jealous of the popularity of the Imperial House, prevented Empress Sunjeonghyo from entering the palace Changdeokgung. She had to live in Suin Hall, a narrow and unsuitable residence in Jeongneung, Seoul. After a change in government in 1961 she returned to Nakseon Hall, Changdeokgung with her dutiful ladies-in-waiting: Park Chang-bok (d. 1981), Kim Myung-gil (d. 1983) and Sung Ok-yeom (d. 2001), and five other staff.

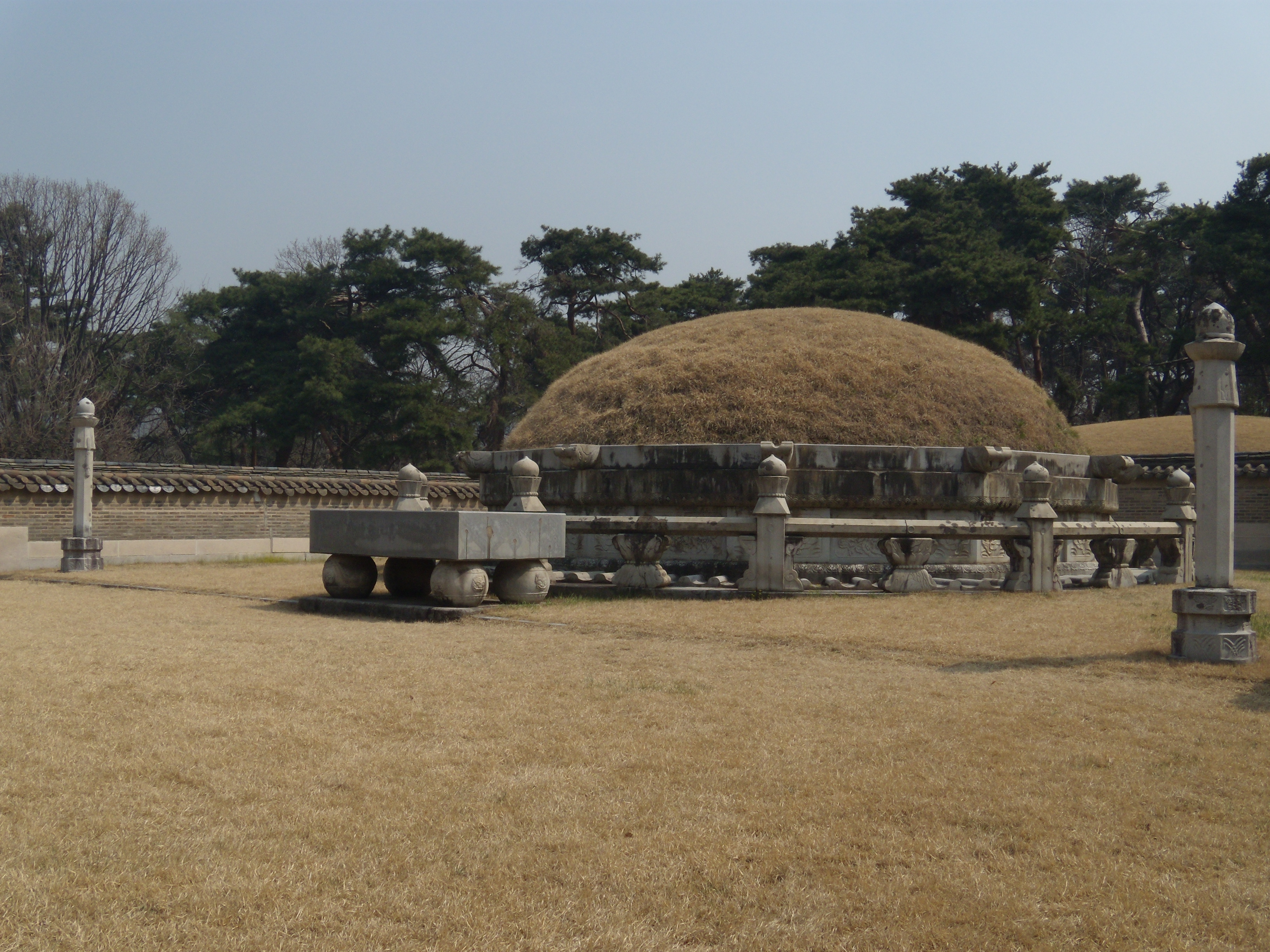
The Yureung Imperial Tomb where Emperor Sunjong and Empresses Sunmyeong and Sunjeong are buried. This is an exceptional case where three persons are buried in the same mound, known as hapjangneung (合葬陵)

After 37 years, Princess Deokhye was also able to return to Korea at the invitation of the South Korean government on 26 January 1962 due to reporter Kim Eul-han's help. She was later welcomed and reunited by her kindergarten and elementary school classmate, and her 72-year-old wet nurse when they went to pick her up at Gimpo Airport.

The empress later met her that same day before the princess underwent a surgery at Seoul National University Hospital.

Empress Sunjeonghyo became a Buddhist in her later years.

She died childless on 3 February 1966, aged 72, at Nakseon Hall, Changdeok Palace, Seoul from a heart attack. She was given a state funeral and a private Buddhist funeral. She is buried beside her husband, Emperor Yunghui and his first wife, Empress Sunmyeong, at the Yureung Imperial Tomb.

== Family ==
- Father
  - Yun Taek-yeong (윤택영; 尹澤榮; 1876 – 24 October 1935)
- Mother
  - Internal Princess Consort Gyeongheung of the Gigye Yu clan (경흥부부인 기계 유씨; 慶興府夫人 杞溪 兪氏; 1876 – 1936)
- Siblings
  - Older brother - Yun Hong-seop (윤홍섭; 尹弘燮) or Yun Song-mu (윤송무; 尹松茂; 1893 – 1955); became the adoptive son of his uncle, Yun Si-yeong
  - Younger sister - Yun Hui-seop (윤희섭; 尹喜燮; 6 November 1905 – ?)
  - Younger brother - Yun Ui-seop (윤의섭; 尹毅燮; 8 March 1912 – 25 February 1965); succeeded his father in becoming Marquis
- Husband
  - Yi Cheok, Emperor Sunjong (25 March 1874 – 24 April 1926) — No issue.
    - Mother-in-law - Min Ja-yeong, Empress Myeongseong of the Yeoheung Min clan (17 November 1851 – 8 October 1895)
    - Father-in-law - Yi Hui, Emperor Gojong of Korea (9 September 1852 – 21 January 1919)
- Issue
  - Adoptive son - Prince Yi Jin (이진; 李晉; 18 August 1921 – 11 May 1922)

== In popular culture ==
- Portrayed by Jang Seo-hee in the 1990 MBC TV series 500 Years of Joseon: Daewongun
- Portrayed by Kim Ji-mi in the 1966 film The Last Empress
- Portrayed by Song Seo-ha in the 2016 film The Last Princess

== See also ==
- Korean Empire
- History of Korea
- House of Yi

== Notes and references ==
=== References ===
Royal titles
Preceded by Empress Sunmyeong	Empress consort of Korea; 20 July 1907 – 29 August 1910	Title dissolved Korea annexed by Japan
Titles in pretence
Loss of title Dynasty deposed	— TITULAR — Empress consort of Korea; 29 August 1910 – 24 April 1926	Succeeded by Princess Masako of Nashimoto
