= Empress Sunmyeonghyo =

Korean empress consort (1872–1904)

Empress Sunmyeonghyo 순명효황후
- Empress consort of Korea (posthumously honored)

Crown Princess of Joseon
- Tenure: 6 April 1882 – 13 October 1897
- Predecessor: Crown Princess Jo
- Successor: Title and dynasty abolished

Crown Princess of Korea
- Tenure: 13 October 1897 – 23 October 1904
- Predecessor: Title and dynasty established
- Successor: Crown Princess Yun
- Born: 8 November 1872; Yangdeokbang, Gyedong District, Hanseong, Joseon Korea
- Died: 23 October 1904 (aged 31); Kangtaesil, Gyeongun Palace, Hanseong, Korean Empire
- Burial: Yureung
- Spouse: Sunjong of Korea (m. 1882–1904)
Posthumous name
- 순명비; 純明妃; 경현성휘순명효황후; 敬顯成徽純明孝皇后
- House: Yeoheung Min clan (by birth); Jeonju Yi clan (by marriage)
- Father: Min Tae-ho
- Mother: Internal Princess Consort Jinyang of the Jincheon Song clan

Empress Sunmyeonghyo or literally known as Sunmyeong, the Filial Piety Empress (Korean: 순명효황후; Hanja: 純明孝皇后; RR: Sunmyeonghyohwanghu; 8 November 1872 – 23 October 1904), of the Yeoheung Min clan, was the first wife and Crown Princess Consort of Crown Prince Yi Cheok, who later became the last emperor of the Korean Empire.

== Biography ==
Lady Min was born on 20 November 1872 into the Yeoheung Min clan to Min Tae-ho, leader of the Yeoheung Min clan, and his second wife, Lady Song of the Jincheon Song clan. She had an older half-brother and one younger brother. It was said that her family was poor when she was young until her older half-brother, Min Yeong-ik, became the adoptive son of Min Seung-ho; who was a relative of the clan.

This was because Min Seung-ho was the adoptive son of Min Chi-rok, the father of Empress Myeongseong. Thus making her adoptive uncle the adoptive older brother of Empress Myeongseong who became Queen in 1866 which helped her family thrive. Despite having another son, her father adopted another son from a relative within their clan.

Lady Min also became the adoptive niece to Grand Internal Princess Consort Yeoheung and Grand Internal Prince Heungseon. Making her be adoptive cousins with Min Yeong-hwan, Min Yeong-chan, Prince Heungchin, and Emperor Gojong. Through her 4th great-grandfather, Min Jin-won, she was a 4th great-grandniece to Queen Inhyeon, and was a distant cousin of Queen Wongyeong as they shared Min Jeok as their ancestor. She was also a distant degree cousin of Empress Myeongseong.

She became Crown Princess Consort when she married Crown Prince Yi Cheok on 6 April 1882 at the age of 9. She was given the royal title of Crown Princess Consort Min (세자빈 민씨). Around that year, her mother and her father’s third wife died.

With the marriage, it granted her parents royal titles: her father was given the title of “Internal Prince Yeoeun” (여은부원군; 驪恩府院君; Yeoeunbuwongun), and her mother was given the title of “Internal Princess Consort Jinyang of the Jincheon Song clan” (진양부부인 진천 송씨; 鎭陽府夫人 鎭川 宋氏; Jinyangbubuin Jincheon Songssi). Her father's other two wives were also given royal titles as well since Lady Min was their step-daughter.

The princess, aged 22, was a witness to her mother-in-law's assassination on 8 October 1895, when she stood in front of the Empress, attempting to protect her. This may have contributed to her early death, as she was plagued by severe depression thereafter.

In 1897, when the Korean Empire became established, her royal title changed to Imperial Crown Princess Consort Min (황태자비 민씨; 皇太子妃 閔氏; Hwangtaejabi Minssi).

Although the Crown Princess and Crown Prince were at the age and stage to have an heir, they did not have children of their own. This was probably due to the Coffee Poisoning Plot that might have gotten her husband infertile from the poison.

She died on 5 November 1904 in Kangtaeil, Gyeongun Palace (now known as Deoksu Palace), before her husband was enthroned. The 13-year-old Yun Jeung-sun was selected and arranged to take her position as crown princess consort in 1907.

She was firstly given the posthumous title of Primary Consort Sunyeol (순열비; 純烈妃; Sunyeolbi), but it was soon changed to Primary Consort Sunmyeong (순명비; 純明妃; Sun-myeongbi). Her title was once again changed to her well-known posthumous title, Empress Sunmyeonghyo (순명효황후; 純明孝皇后; Sunmyeonghyohwanghu), when Sunjong became emperor on 19 July 1907.

Empress Sunmyeong was first buried in Nae-dong, Yongmasan, Yangju, Gyeonggi Province where the Neungho at the time was called Yugangwon. She was then moved to Geumgok-dong, Namyangju where the Neungho was changed to Yureung when Sunjong died in 1926. The crown princess is buried with her husband and his second wife, Empress Sunjeong. In 1970, by order of President Park Chung-hee, construction of the Seoul Children's Grand Park started and opened the following year in the Yugangwon (Now Gwangjin-gu, Seoul).

== Family ==
- Father
  - Min Tae-ho, Duke Chungmun, Internal Prince Yeoeun (여은부원군 충문공 민태호, 閔台鎬/閔泰鎬; 1834 – 18 October 1884); became the adoptive son of Min Chi-sam (민치삼, 閔致三; 1800–1837)
    - Adoptive Aunt - Grand Internal Princess Consort Sunmok (순목대원비; 純穆大院妃; 3 February 1818 – 8 January 1898)
      - Adoptive Uncle - Heungseon Daewongun (흥선대원군; 1820–1898)
        - Adoptive Cousin - Lady Yi of the Jeonju Yi clan (전주 이씨; 1838–1869)
        - Adoptive Cousin - Prince Imperial Heungchin (흥친왕; 1845–1912)
        - Adoptive Cousin - Yi Myeong-bok, King Gojong of Joseon (고종; 8 September 1852 – 21 January 1919)
        - Adoptive Cousin - Lady Yi of the Jeonju Yi clan (전주 이씨; 1861–1899)
- Mother
  - Step - Internal Princess Consort Paseong of the Paepyeong Yun clan (정경부인 증 파성부부인 파평 윤씨; 坡城府夫人 坡平 尹氏; 1833–1865); Min Tae-ho’s first wife
  - Biological - Internal Princess Consort Jinyang of the Jincheon Song clan (정경부인 증 진양부부인 진천 송씨; 鎭陽府夫人 鎭川 宋氏; 1849–1882); Min Tae-ho's second wife
  - Step - Internal Princess Consort Uichang of the Uiryeong Nam clan (의창부부인 의령 남씨; 宜昌府夫人 宜寧 南氏; 1859–1882); Min Tae-ho’s third wife
- Siblings
  - Older half-brother - Min Yeong-ik (민영익; 閔泳翊; 1860–1914); became the adoptive son of Min Seung-ho
  - Adoptive younger brother - Min Yeong-rin (민영린; 閔泳璘; 1873 – 1 June 1932); son of Min Sul-ho (민술호; 1838–1921)
  - Younger brother - Min Yeong-seon (민영선; 閔泳璇; 1875–1924)
- Husband
  - Yi Cheok, Emperor Sunjeong (순종효황제; 25 March 1874 – 25 April 1926) — No issue.
    - Mother-in-law - Min Ja-yeong, Empress Myeongseong of the Yeoheung Min clan (명성황후 여흥 민씨; 17 November 1851 – 8 October 1895)
    - Father-in-law - Yi Myeong-bok, Emperor Gojong (고종태황제; 9 September 1852 – 21 January 1919)

== In popular culture ==
- Portrayed by Gwak Jin-yeong in 1990 MBC TV series 500 Years of Joseon: Daewongun
- Portrayed by Park Eun-bin, Kim So-yeong, and Lee Yu-ri in the 2001–2002 KBS2 TV series Empress Myeongseong
