= Order of the Plum Blossom =

1897–1910 order of the Korean Empire

Order of the Plum Blossom 대훈위 이화대수장 大勳位李花大綬章
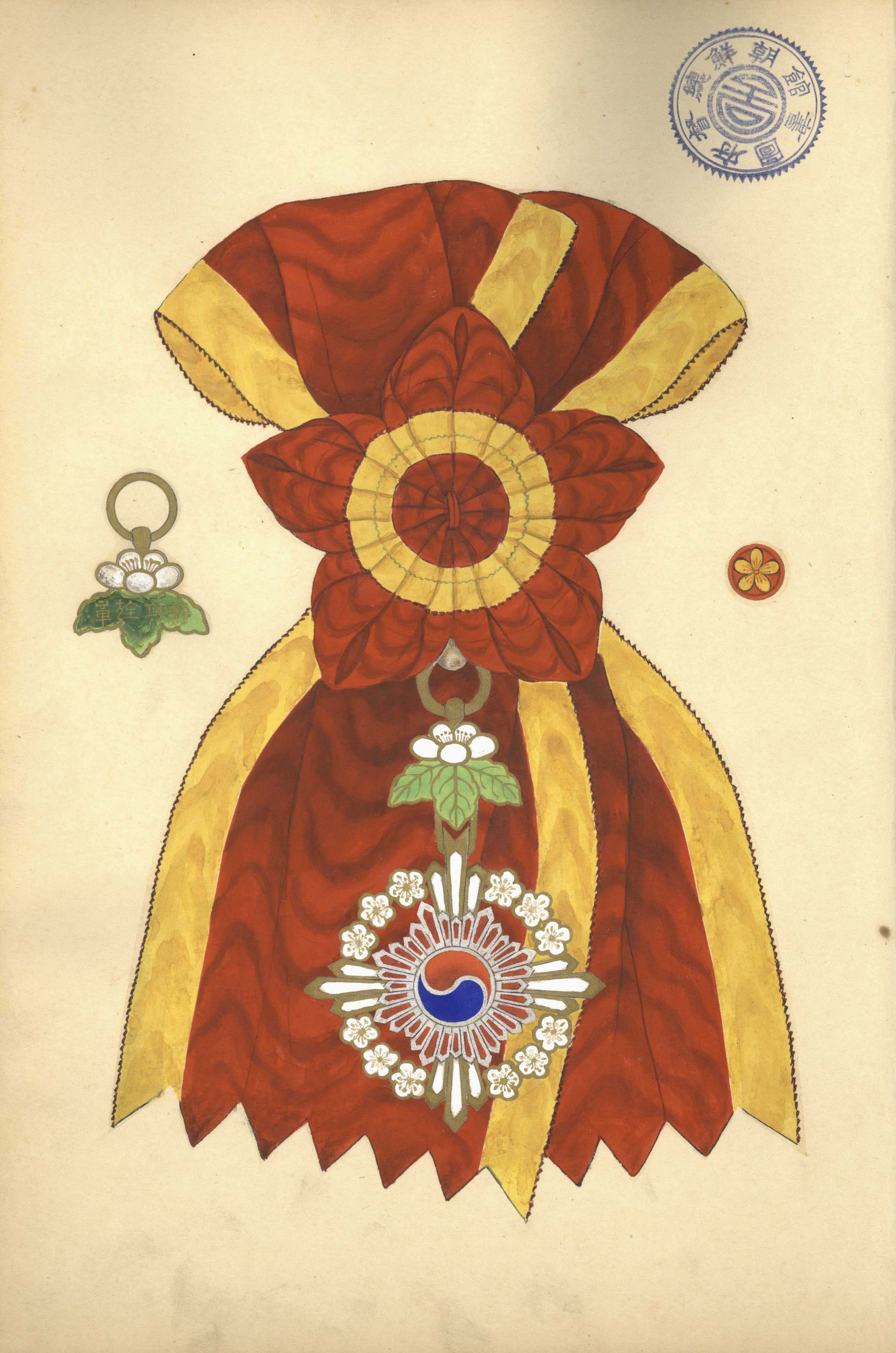
- Type: Dynastic order
- Awarded for: Merit
- Presented by: the Korean Empire
- Eligibility: Civilians and military, Korean and foreign, who got the first class of order of the Taegeuk and has special merit after receiving order of the Taegeuk
- Status: Obsolete
- Established: April 17, 1897 (in Korea)

Precedence
- Next (higher): Order of the Auspicious Stars
- Next (lower): Order of the Taegeuk

The Order of the Plum Blossom (also called as Order of the Ihwa) was an order of chivalry of the Korean Empire. It was the third highest order of Korean Empire.

== History ==
Order of the Plum Blossom was established in 1897 by Gojong of Korea. The order of the Plum Blossom was given to those who already got the first class Order of the Taegeuk with special merit. Only the Emperor could bestow Order of the Plum Blossom. There were 62 recipients of Order of the Plum Blossom.

== Form ==
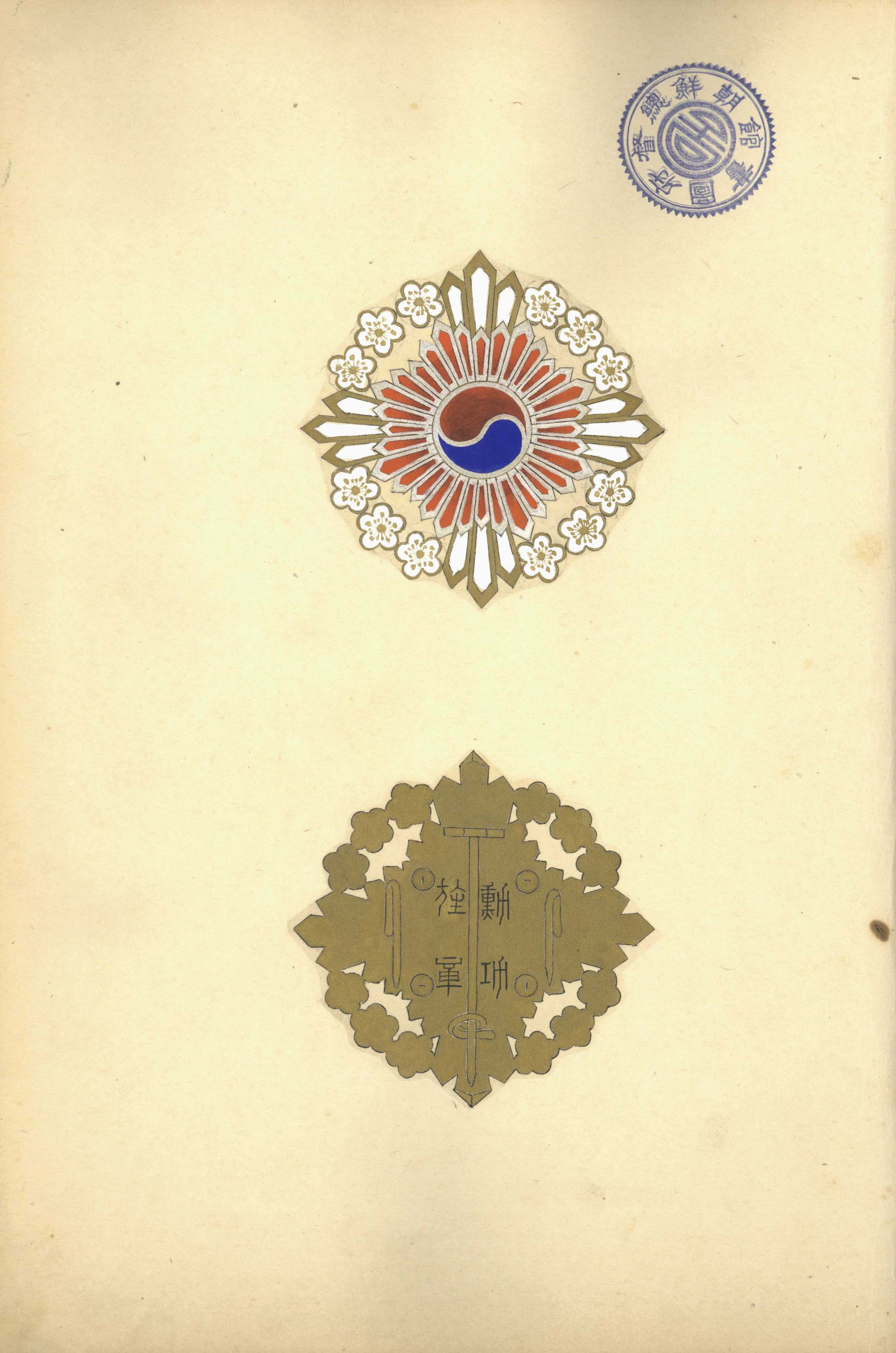
Medal of the Order of the Plum Blossom

The Order of the Plum Blossom was divided into Grand Cordon and Medal, with the only difference being that the perimeter of the Grand Cordon was 7.5 centimeters and the medal was 7 centimeters. They were made of silver and gold. '勳功旌章' (훈공정장) was engraved on the reverse.

The Grand Cordon was worn from the right shoulder to the left flank. it is crossed at the end, folded with a cloth, and a suit is attached, and the head is hung on the left chest.

== Notable recipients ==
- Shim Soon-taek on 16 March 1902
- Inoue Kaoru on 24 March 1902
- Yi Jae-wan on 16 September 1904
- Min Young-hwan on 16 September 1904
- Komura Jutarō on 19 September 1904
- Yikuang on 27 February 1905
- Kuwashi Okazawa on 7 March 1905
- Yi Jae-gak on 19 March 1905
- Ōura Kanetake on 28 May 1905
- Kuroki Tamemoto on 28 December 1906
- Terauchi Masatake on 28 December 1906
