= Order of the Golden Ruler =

Award of the Korean Empire

Order of the Golden Ruler 대훈위 금척대수장 大勳位金尺大綬章
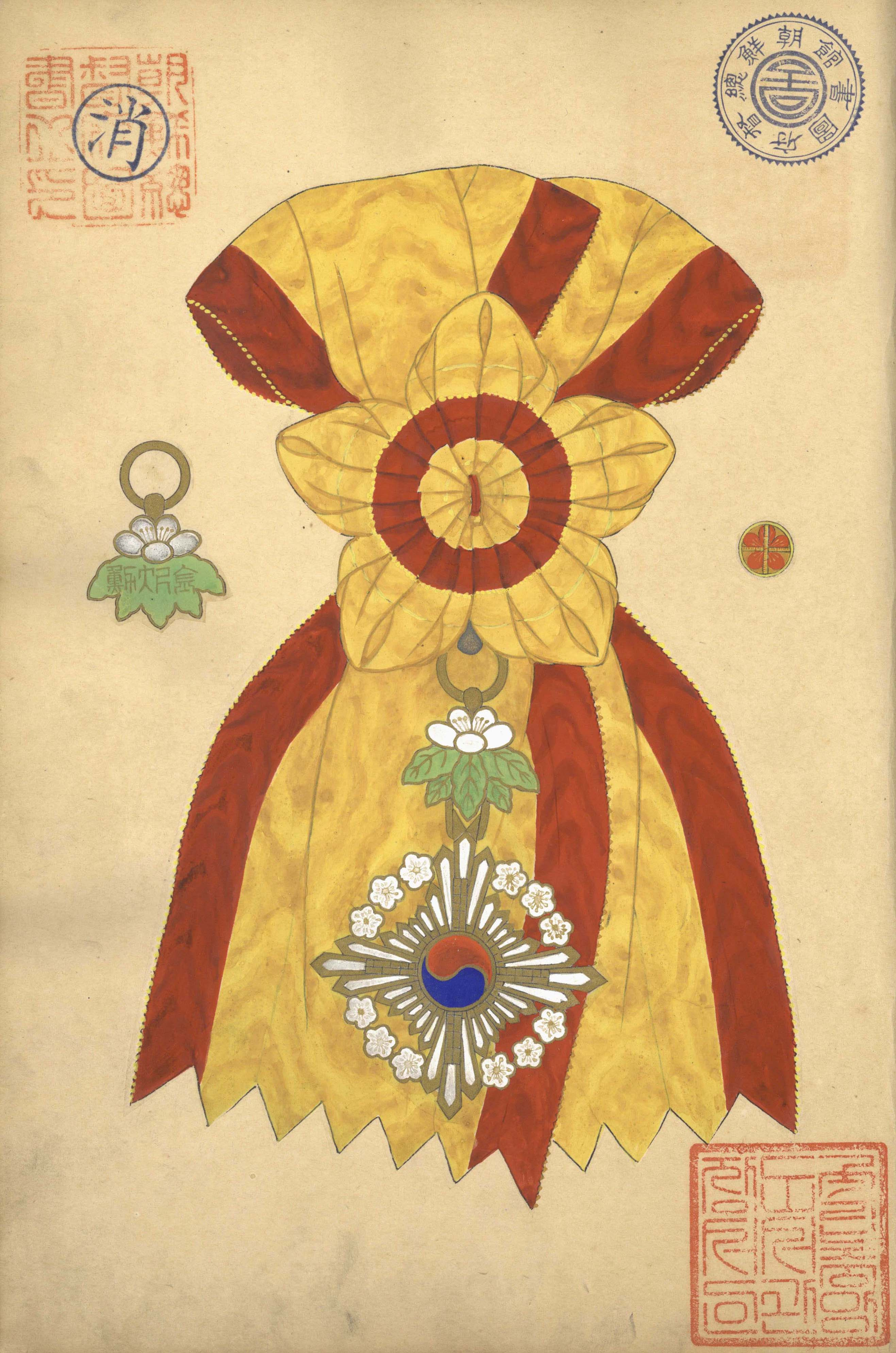
- Type: Dynastic order
- Awarded for: Merit
- Presented by: the Korean Empire
- Eligibility: Civilians and military, Korean and foreign, with rank/status determining which grade one received
- Status: Obsolete
- Established: April 17, 1897(in Korea)

Precedence
- Next (higher): None
- Next (lower): Order of the Auspicious Stars

The Order of the Golden Ruler or the Order of the Taejo was the highest Order of chivalry in the Korean Empire. It was established on 17 April 1897 by Gojong of Korea, four years after he established the Korean Empire.

== History ==
In the summer of 1897, Gojong of Korea began to consider creating orders for his newly-established empire. For inspiration, he had considered a European-style model. He formally established the order on 17 April 1897. The highest rank of the order, the Grand Cordon, was first awarded to Gojong of Korea, Sunjong of Korea, and Yi Un. Gojong named the order for a dream Taejo of Joseon claimed to have, which inspired him to establish Joseon. Gojong also stated that the award of the order was "happily" intended for those who served Korea.

The first foreigner to receive the order was Prince Henry of Prussia on 20 March 1904. He received it during his visit to the Korean Empire, an exchange typically observed for foreign heads of state. Over ten years, 27 foreigners were named to the Order.

Recipients received a pension of 600~1,000 Won annually or a one-time payment of 2,000 Won It is regarded that the order was awarded to too many recipients for its intended degree of honor.

== Form ==
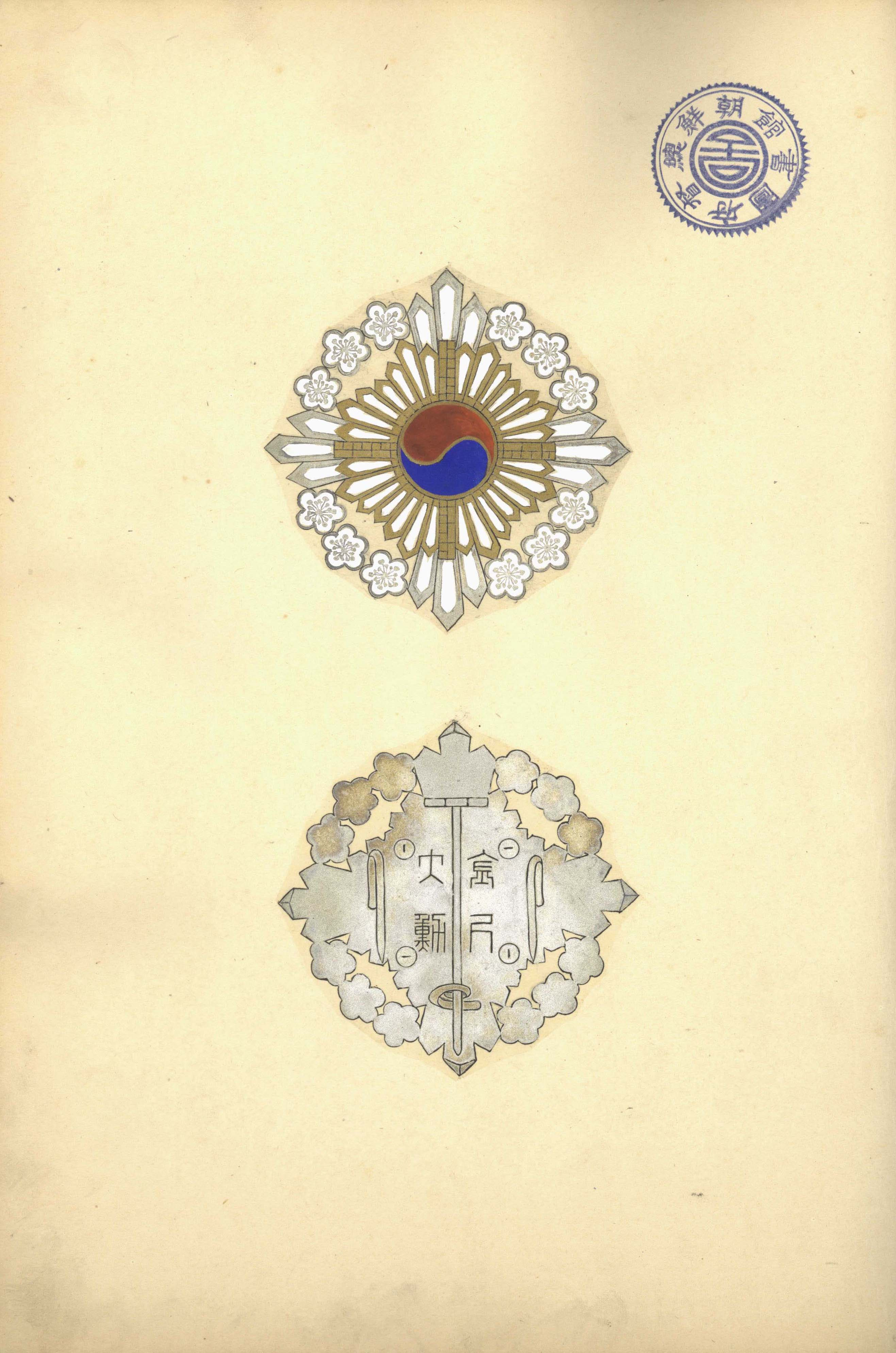
Badge of the Order of the Golden Ruler.

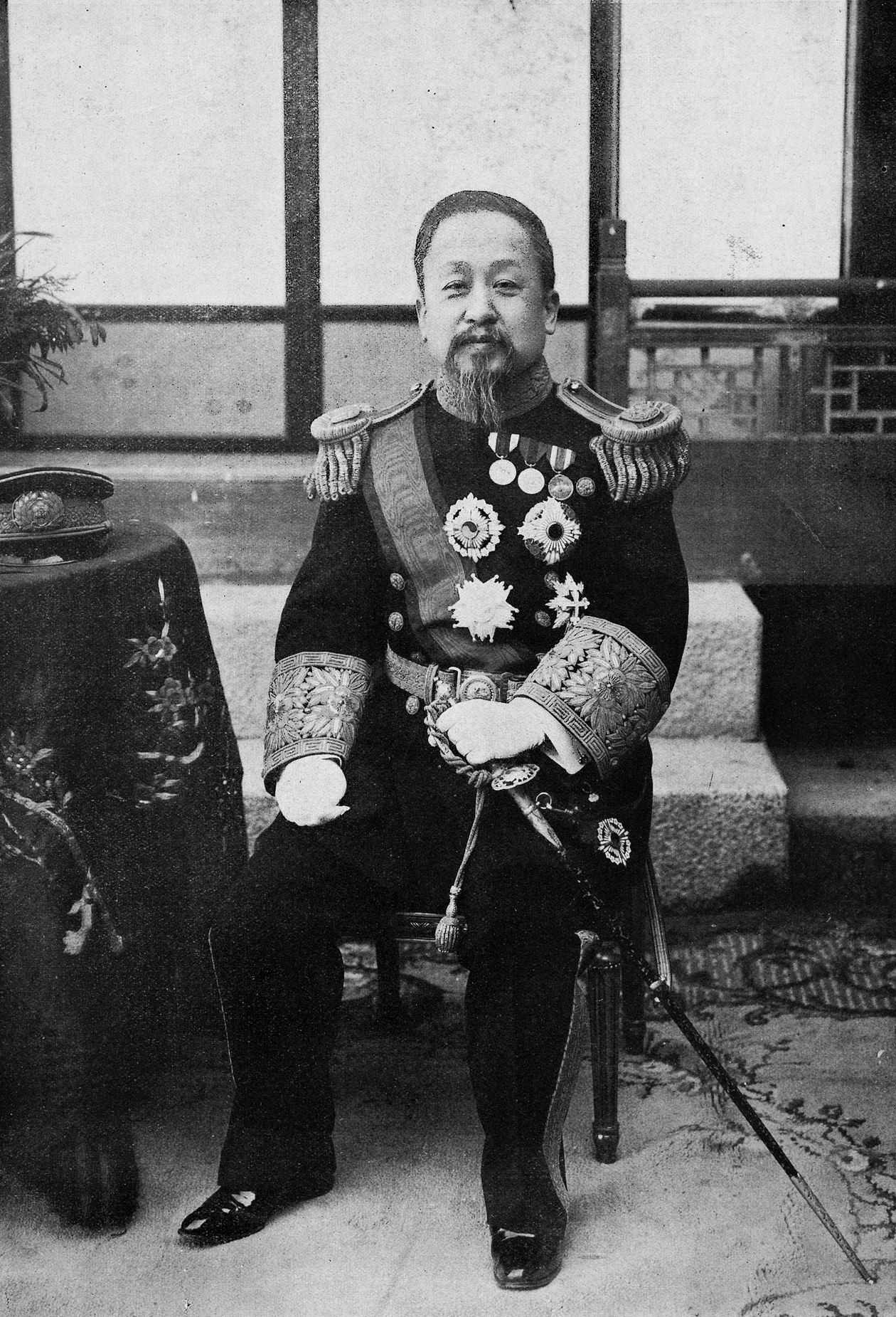
Gojong wearing the badge of order of the Golden Ruler

"The badge is composed of a Badge and a Medal. The material of the suit jacket (章) is gold, and the diameter is 2 chi (寸) and 5 pun (分), which is 7.5 cm. With the blue-and-red Taegeuk wrapped in gold line as the center, the golden rulers placed per cross and white rays extend from the golden ruler as the axis, and three white oyster flowers are arranged in each ray between the rays. Badge included Daesu, which is wore from right shoulder to left side. Medal is just the same as the badge but its perimeter is 6cm." The reverse of the badge have the inspection '金尺大勳' (금척대훈).

== See also ==
- Orders, decorations, and medals of the Korean Empire
- Korean Empire
- Grand Order of Mugunghwa
