= Order of the Auspicious Stars =

Order of the Auspicious Stars 대훈위 서성대수장 大勳位瑞星大綬章
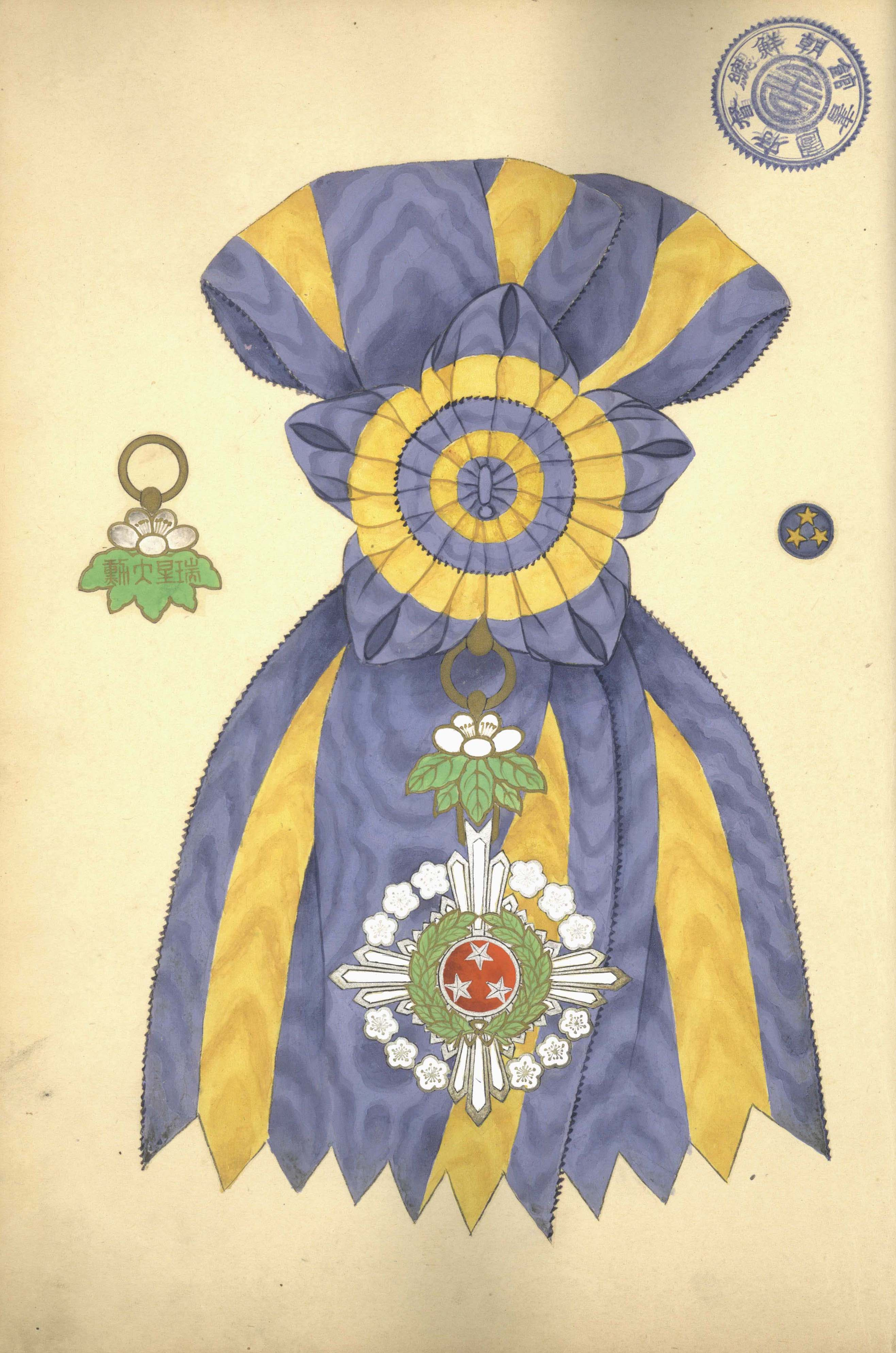

Awarded by the Korean Empire
- Type: State order of chivalry
- Established: 12 August 1897
- Eligibility: Civilians and military, Korean and foreign, with rank/status determining which grade one received
- Criteria: merit
- Status: Defunct

Precedence
- Next (higher): Order of the Golden Ruler
- Next (lower): Order of the Plum Blossom

The Order of the Auspicious Stars was the second highest order of chivalry of the Korean Empire. It was established in 1897 with other orders by Emperor Gojong, as part of reforms of the Korean Empire.

== History ==
In 1897, Gojong of Korea introduced the order of the auspicious stars as a lower-ranked than the Order of the Golden Ruler. It was not the part of the official honors established in 1897. The Order of the Auspicious Stars did not have any classes. There were 13 recipients of the Order of the Auspicious Stars from 1897 to 1910. (Note: Order of the Auspicious Stars was not awarded until 1898.)

== Form ==
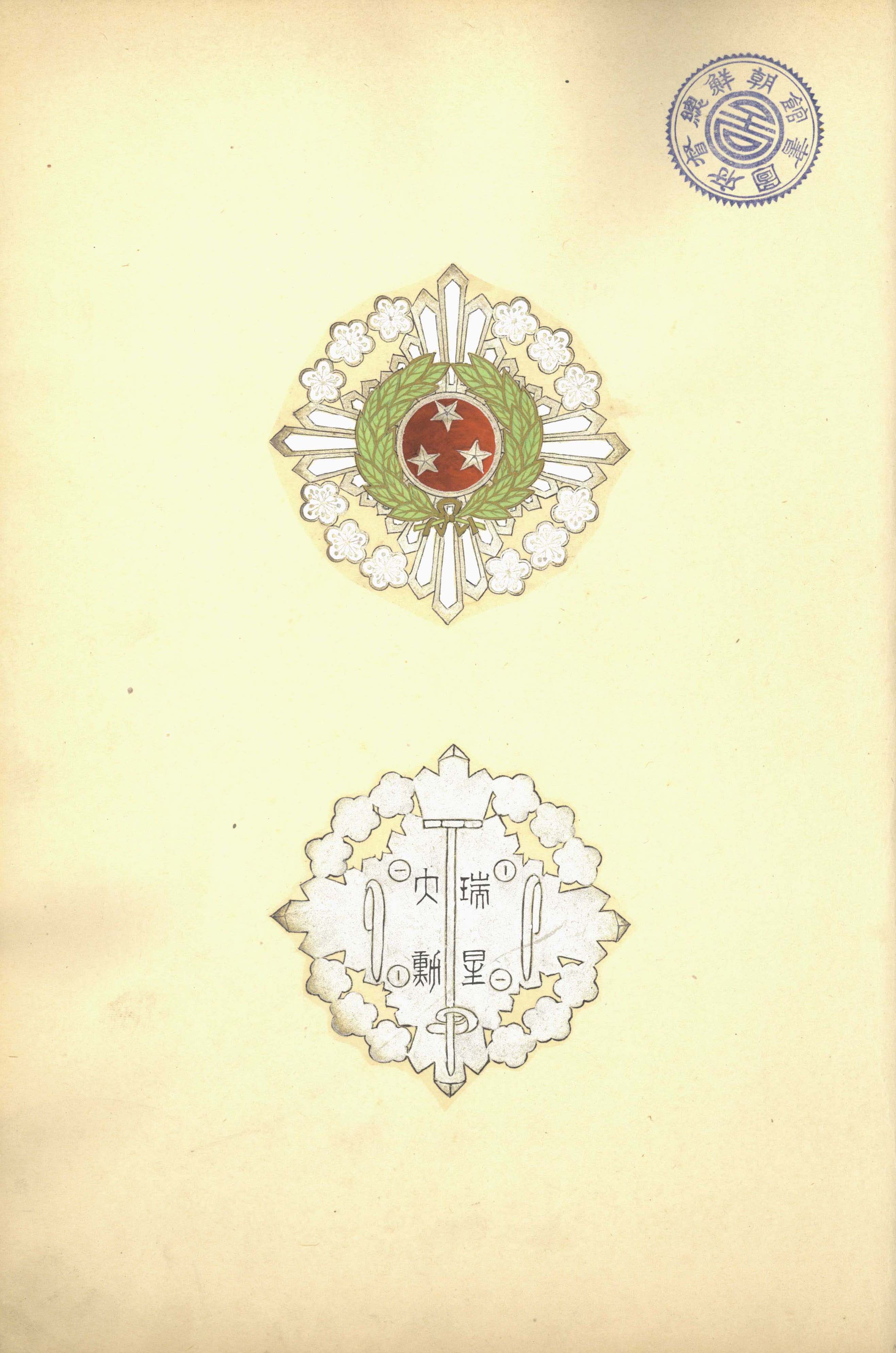
Medal of the Order of the Auspicious Stars

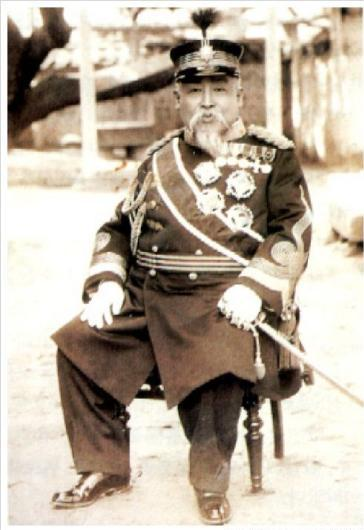
Prince Heungchin wearing his Grand Cordon of Auspicious stars

ThenOrder of the Auspicious Stars was divided into two types: the Grand Cordon and the medal. Perimeter of Grand Cordon was 7.5 centimeters. In the red central circle, surrounded by white lines, silver-white stars are arranged in three directions. Cucumber leaves encircle the central circle, followed by silver-white rays are arranged in a cross shape. Three white oyster flowers are placed in each space between the rays. On the reverse of medal, '瑞星大勳' (서성대훈) was engraved. The Medal was the same as the Grand Cordon, except its perimeter was 6 centimeters.

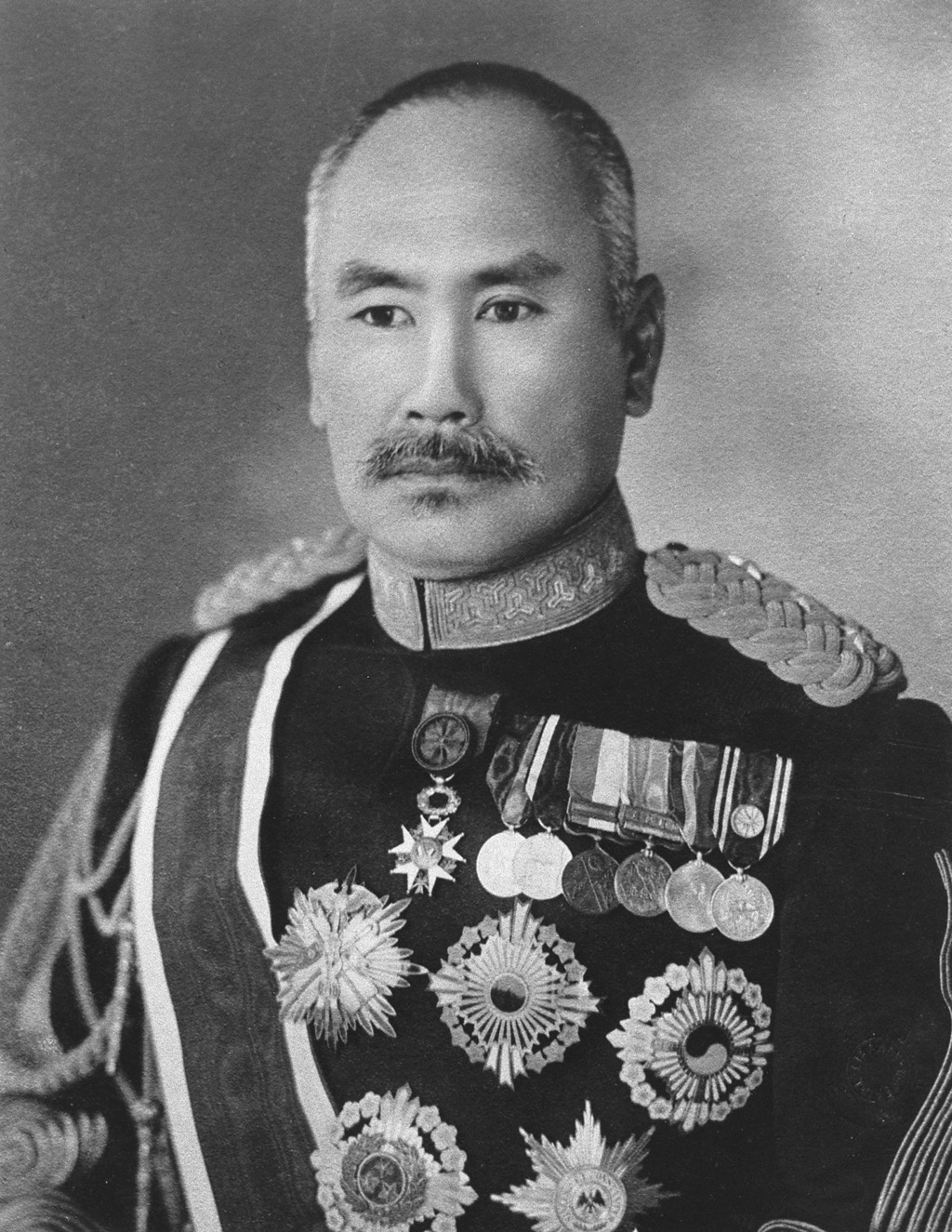
Hasegawa Yoshimichi wearing the Grand Cordon of Order of the Auspicious Stars

Grand Cordon included Daesu, which was worn from the left shoulder to the right, while the medal was worn on the left breast.

== Recipients ==
- Hasegawa Yoshimichi on 12 March 1907
- Terauchi Masatake on 29 June 1907
- Yi Jun-yong on 23 September 1908
- Iwakura Tomosada on 2 April 1910
