= Sunjong of Korea =

Emperor of Korea from 1907 to 1910

Sunjong
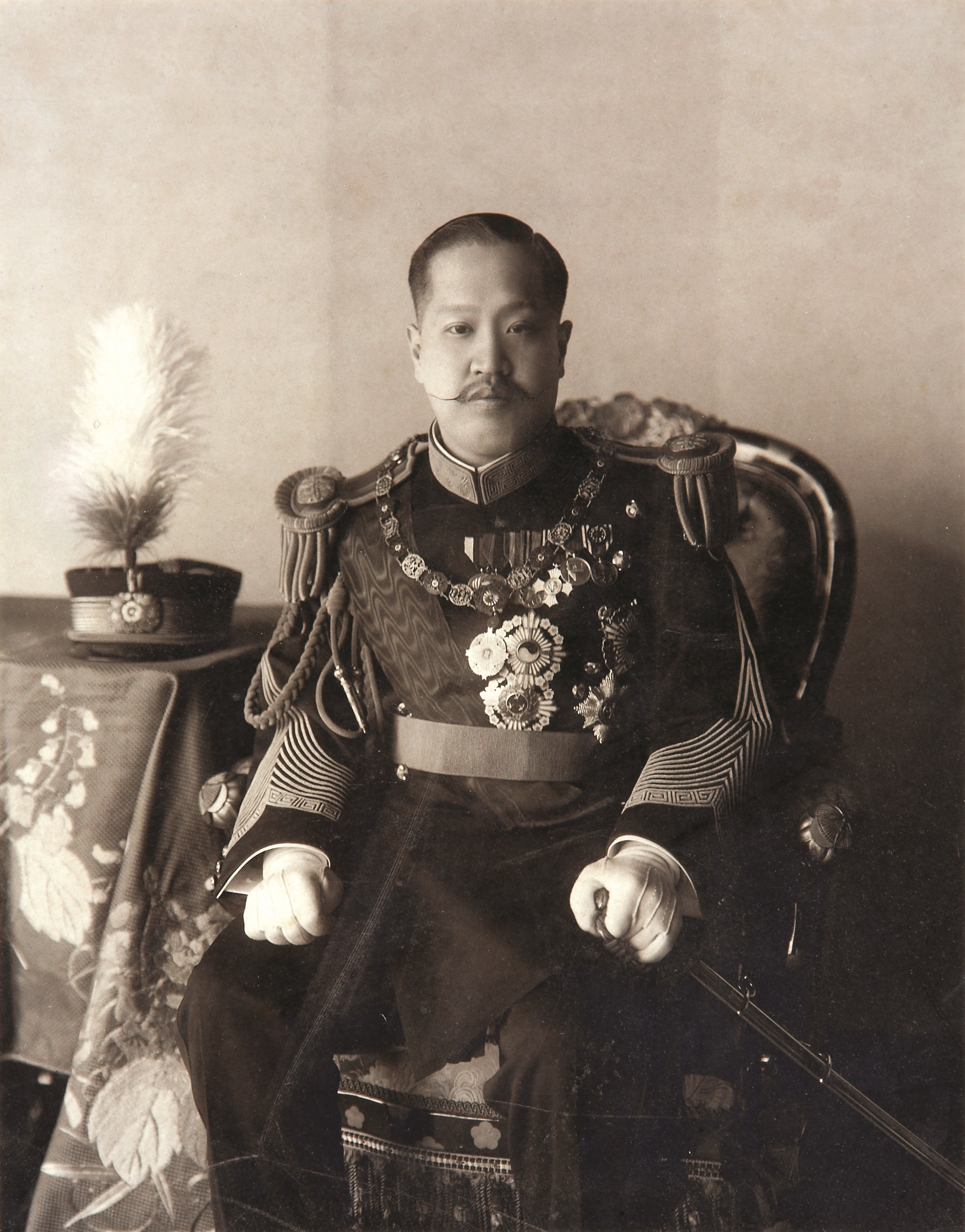
- Sunjong in c. 1910

King Yi of Changdeokgung (Empire of Japan)
- Tenure: 29 August 1910 – 25 April 1926
- Predecessor: None
- Successor: Yi Un

Emperor of Korea
- Reign: 19 July 1907 – 29 August 1910
- Enthronement: 22 July 1907; Dondeokjeon, Gyeongungung
- Predecessor: Gojong
- Successor: Monarchy abolished (Korea annexed by Japan)

Crown Prince of Korea
- Tenure: 12 October 1897 – 19 July 1907
- Successor: Crown Prince Un

Crown Prince of Joseon (Note: From 12 January 1895 to 12 October 1897, he was "Crown Prince of the Great Joseon State" (대조선국 왕태자; 大朝鮮國 王太子; lit. ''Royal Supreme Son of the Great Joseon State'').)
- Tenure: 25 March 1875 – 12 October 1897
- Investiture: Injeongjeon, Changdeokgung
- Predecessor: Crown Prince Yeong
- Successor: Establishment of the Korean Empire
- Born: 25 March 1874; Gwanmulheon, Changdeokgung, Hanseong, Joseon
- Died: 25 April 1926 (aged 52); Daejojeon, Changdeokgung, Keijō, Chōsen
- Burial: Yureung, Namyangju, South Korea
- Spouses: Empress Sunmyeonghyo (m. 1882; died 1904) Empress Sunjeonghyo (m. 1907)
Names
- Yi Cheok (이척; 李坧)
Era dates
- Yunghui (융희; 隆熙): 1907–1910
Posthumous name
- Emperor Munon Mulyeong Donin Seonggyeong Hyo (문온무령돈인성경효황제; 文溫武寧敦仁誠敬孝皇帝)
Temple name
- Sunjong (순종; 純宗)
- Clan: Jeonju Yi
- Dynasty: Yi
- Father: Emperor Gojong
- Mother: Empress Myeongseongtae
- Religion: Confucianism (Neo-Confucianism)

Korean name
- Hangul: 순종
- Hanja: 純宗
- Lit.: "Genuine Ancestor"
- RR: Sunjong
- MR: Sunjong

Monarch name
- Hangul: 융희제
- Hanja: 隆熙帝
- Lit.: "Prosperous and Splendid Emperor"
- RR: Yunghuije
- MR: Yunghŭije

Art name
- Hangul: 정헌
- Hanja: 正軒
- RR: Jeongheon
- MR: Chŏnghŏn

Courtesy name
- Hangul: 군방
- Hanja: 君邦
- RR: Gunbang
- MR: Kunbang

Sunjong (Korean: 순종; Hanja: 純宗; 25 March 1874 (Note: In the Korean calendar (lunisolar), he was born on the 8th day of the 2nd lunar month.) – 25 April 1926), personal name Yi Cheok, also known as the Yunghui Emperor, was the last Korean monarch. He acceded to the throne upon the forced abdication of his father, Emperor Gojong. Hence, Sunjong has been characterized by historians as being a powerless puppet ruler of the Japanese, reigning for just three years before Korea was officially annexed in 1910.

== Biography ==
=== Crown Prince of Korea ===
Sunjong was the second son of Emperor Gojong and Empress Myeongseong. When he turned two years old in 1876, Sunjong was proclaimed the Crown Prince of Joseon. In 1882, he married a woman of the Yeoheung Min clan (later Empress Sunmyeonghyo). She died at the age of 31 on 5 November 1904 due to a severe depression, after trying to protect her mother-in-law (Empress Myeongseong, also a member of the Yeoheung Min clan) from her assassination on 8 October 1895 by the Japanese military.

When his father proclaimed Korea as an Empire in 1897, Sunjong was appointed as the Crown Prince of Imperial Korea on 12 October 1897. On 29 June 1898, he was appointed as the Field Marshal of the Imperial Korean Army. Sunjong remarried again 3 years later to the daughter of Yoon Taek-young, Yun Jeung-sun of the Haepyeong Yun clan, who was 20 years younger than him, on 11 December 1906, and she became Crown Princess Consort Yun (later Empress Sunjeong).

=== Emperor of Korea ===
On 19 July 1907, Gojong was deposed as a result of Japanese coercion, and Sunjong was made the Emperor of Korea. His coronation proceeded in Don-doek-jeon. Prince Imperial Yeong, the younger half-brother of Sunjong, was proclaimed heir to the throne and moved from Deoksugung Palace to the imperial residence at Changdeokgung Palace.

Sunjong's reign was limited by the gradually increasing armed intervention of the Japanese government in Korea. In July 1907, he was proclaimed emperor of Korea but was immediately forced to enter into the Japan–Korea Treaty of 1907. This treaty allowed the Japanese government to supervise and intervene in the administration and governance of Korea, which also allowed for the appointment of Japanese ministers within the government.

While under Japanese supervision, the Korean army was dismissed on the pretext of a lack of public finance regulations. In 1909, Japan implemented the Japan–Korea Protocol, which effectively removed Korea's judicial power. Meanwhile, Japan dispatched Itō Hirobumi, Japanese Resident-General of Korea, to negotiate with Russia over problems involving Korea and Manchuria. However, Itō was assassinated by Ahn Jung-geun at Harbin, which led to the Japanese annexation of Korea in 1910. Pro-Japanese politicians, such as Song Byung-jun and Lee Wan-yong, defected, merging Korea with Japan by fabricating Korea's willingness and establishing the Japan–Korea Annexation Treaty on 29 August 1910.

Although still existent de jure, the intervention by the Japanese government effectively ended Sunjong's reign over the Korean Empire de facto and he became essentially powerless within three years of ruling. Japan, in effect, officially abolished the Korean Empire on 29 August 1910, ending 519 years of the Joseon dynasty.

=== Post-abdication ===
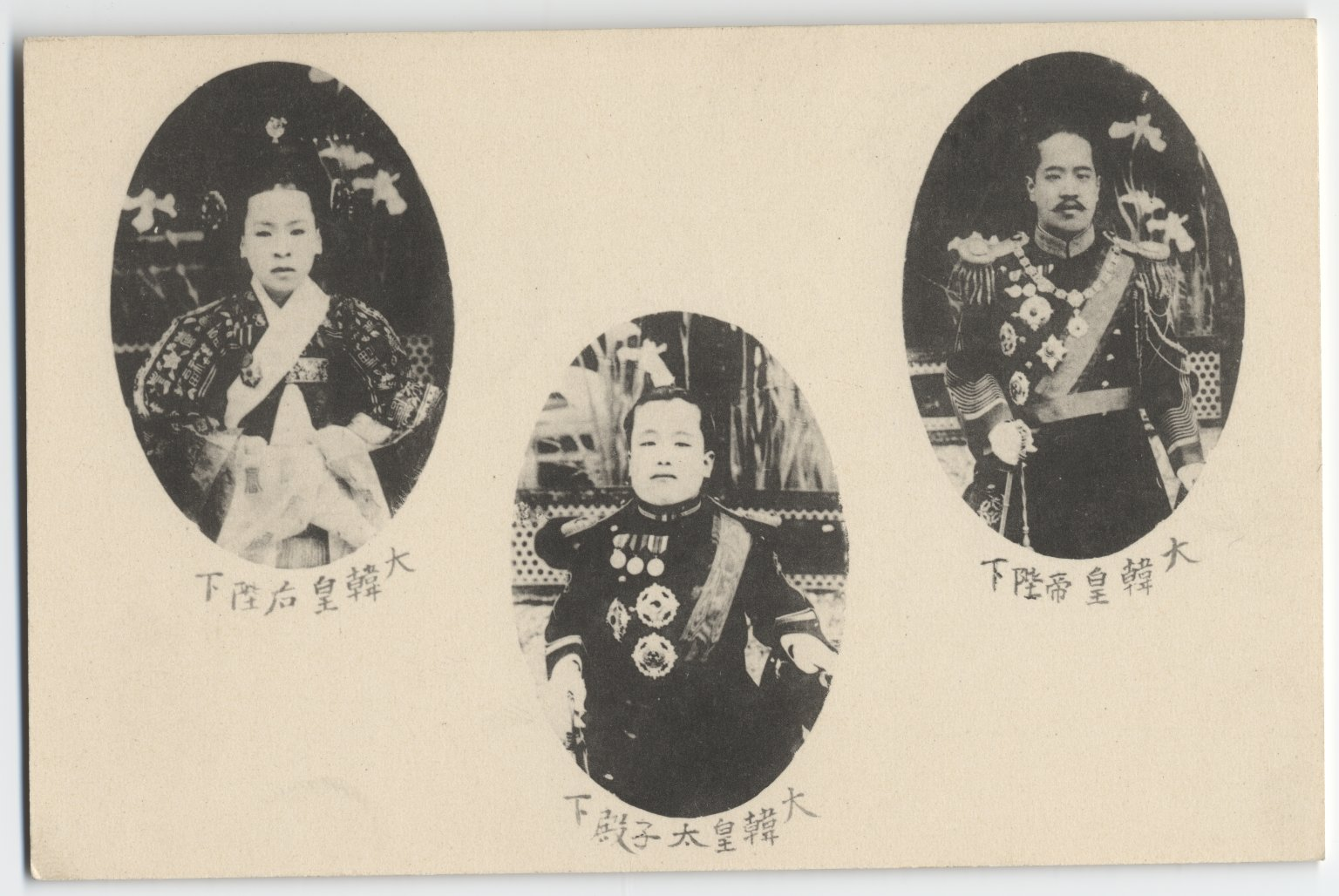
The Emperor, Queen, and Yi On, the Crown Prince, but not the child of the Emperor. The Emperor and his second wife. Image collected in the United States.

After the annexation treaty, the former Emperor Sunjong and his wife, Empress Sunjeong, lived the rest of their lives virtually imprisoned in Changdeokgung Palace (in present-day Seoul). Sunjong could not exercise any power as emperor because there were only pro-Japanese politicians in the government. After the Korean Empire collapsed, Sunjong was demoted from emperor to king. Japan allowed him the title of King Yi of Changdeok Palace (창덕궁 이왕; 昌德宮 李王) and allowed for the title to be inherited.

Sunjong died on 24 April 1926, in Changdeokgung and is buried with his two wives at the imperial tomb of Yureung (유릉; 裕陵) in the city of Namyangju. His state funeral on 10 June 1926, was a catalyst for the June 10th Movement against Japanese rule. He had no children.

== Family ==
- Father: Emperor Gojong (고종황제; 8 September 1852 – 21 January 1919)
  - Biological grandfather: Grand Internal Prince Heungseon (흥선대원군; 24 January 1821 – 22 February 1898)
  - Adoptive grandfather: King Munjo (문조대왕; 18 September 1809 – 25 June 1830)
  - Biological grandmother: Grand Internal Princess Consort Sunmok (순목부대부인), of the Yeoheung Min clan (여흥 민씨; 3 February 1818 – 8 January 1898)
  - Adoptive grandmother: Queen Sinjeong (신정왕후), of the Pungyang Jo clan (풍양 조씨; 9 January 1809 – 23 May 1890)
- Mother: Empress Myeongseongtae (명성태황후), of the Yeoheung Min clan (여흥 민씨; 17 November 1851 – 8 October 1895)
  - Grandfather: Min Chi-rok (민치록), Internal Prince Yeoseong (여성부원군; 1799–1858)
  - Grandmother: Internal Princess Consort Hanchang (한창부부인), of the Hansan Yi clan (한산 이씨; 1818–1874)

Consort(s)

- Empress Sunmyeonghyo (순명효황후), of the Yeoheung Min clan (여흥 민씨; 8 November 1872 – 5 November 1904)
- Empress Sunjeonghyo (순정효황후), of the Haepyeong Yun clan (해평 윤씨; 7 September 1894 – 3 February 1966), given name Jeung-sun (증순)

== Ancestry ==
Ancestors of Sunjong of Korea

Yi Byeong-won (이병원)
Prince Namyeon (남연군)
Lady, of the Yeonil Jeong clan (연일 정씨)
Grand Internal Prince Heungseon (흥선대원군)
Min Gyeong-hyeok (민경혁)
Princess Consort Yeoheung, of the Yeoheung Min clan (여흥군부인 여흥 민씨)
Lady, of the Cheongju Han clan (청주 한씨)
Emperor Gojong (고종황제)
Min Dan-hyeon (민단현)
Min Chi-gu (민치구)
Lady, of the Miryang Park clan (밀양 박씨)
Grand Internal Princess Consort Sunmok, of the Yeoheung Min clan (순목부대부인 여흥 민씨)
Yi Ok (이옥)
Lady, of the Jeonju Yi clan (전주 이씨)
Lady, of the Gyeongju Kim clan (경주 김씨)
Emperor Sunjong
Min Baek-bun (민백분)
Min Gi-hyeon (민기현)
Lady, of the Shim clan (심씨)
Min Chi-rok, Internal Prince Yeoseong (여성부원군 민치록)
Lady, of the Yeonil Jeong clan (연일 정씨)
Empress Myeongseongtae, of the Yeoheung Min clan (명성태황후 여흥 민씨)
Yi Gyu-nyeon (이규년)
Internal Princess Consort Hanchang, of the Hansan Yi clan (한창부부인 한산 이씨)
Lady, of the Andong Kim clan (안동 김씨)

== Honors ==
- Korea: Founder of the Order of the Auspicious Phoenix (서봉장; 瑞鳳章) (Note: The order was established by the emperor's orders in 1907.)
- Japan
  - Grand Cordon of the Order of the Chrysanthemum (16 January 1901); Collar (17 October 1907)
  - Korean Colonization Decoration (1 August 1912)
- Belgium: Grand Cordon of the Royal Order of Leopold

== Gallery ==
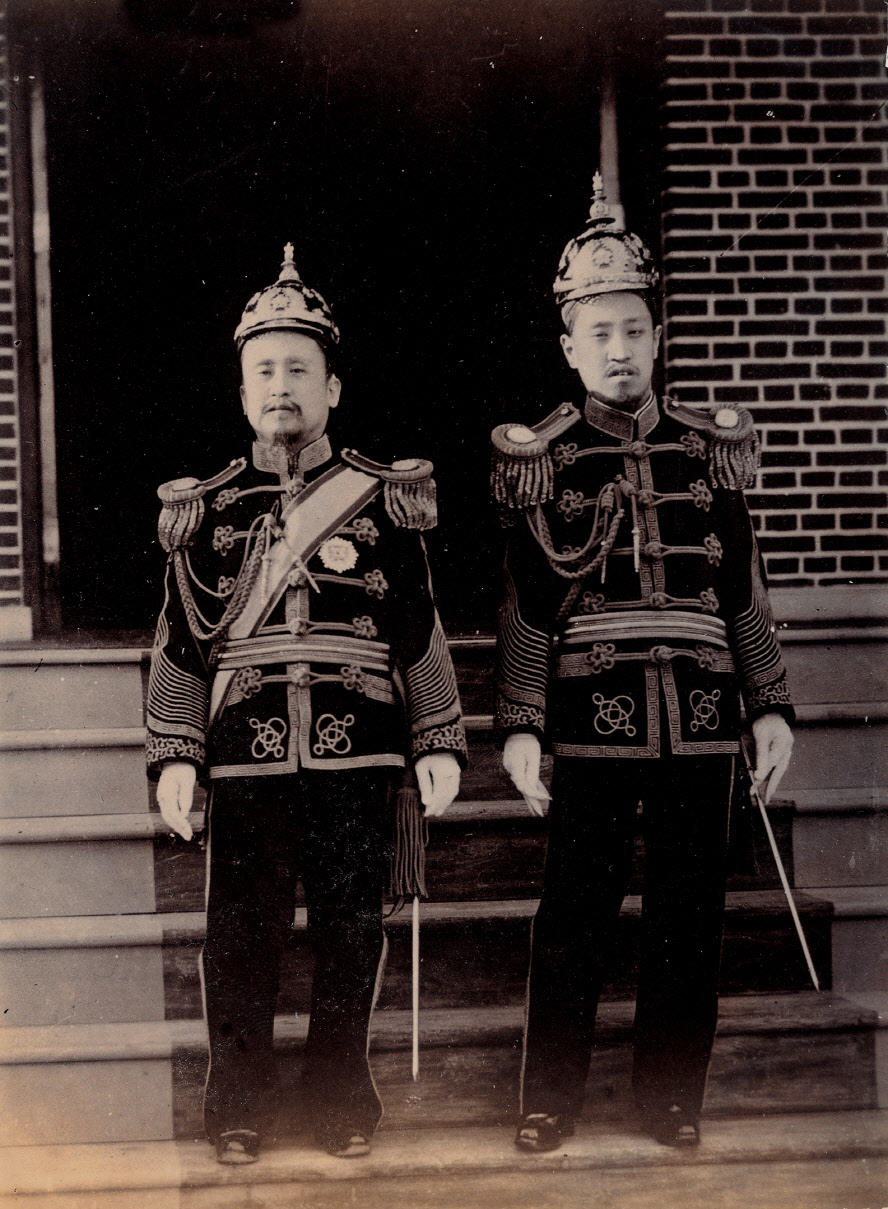
Emperor Gojong and then-Crown Prince Cheok

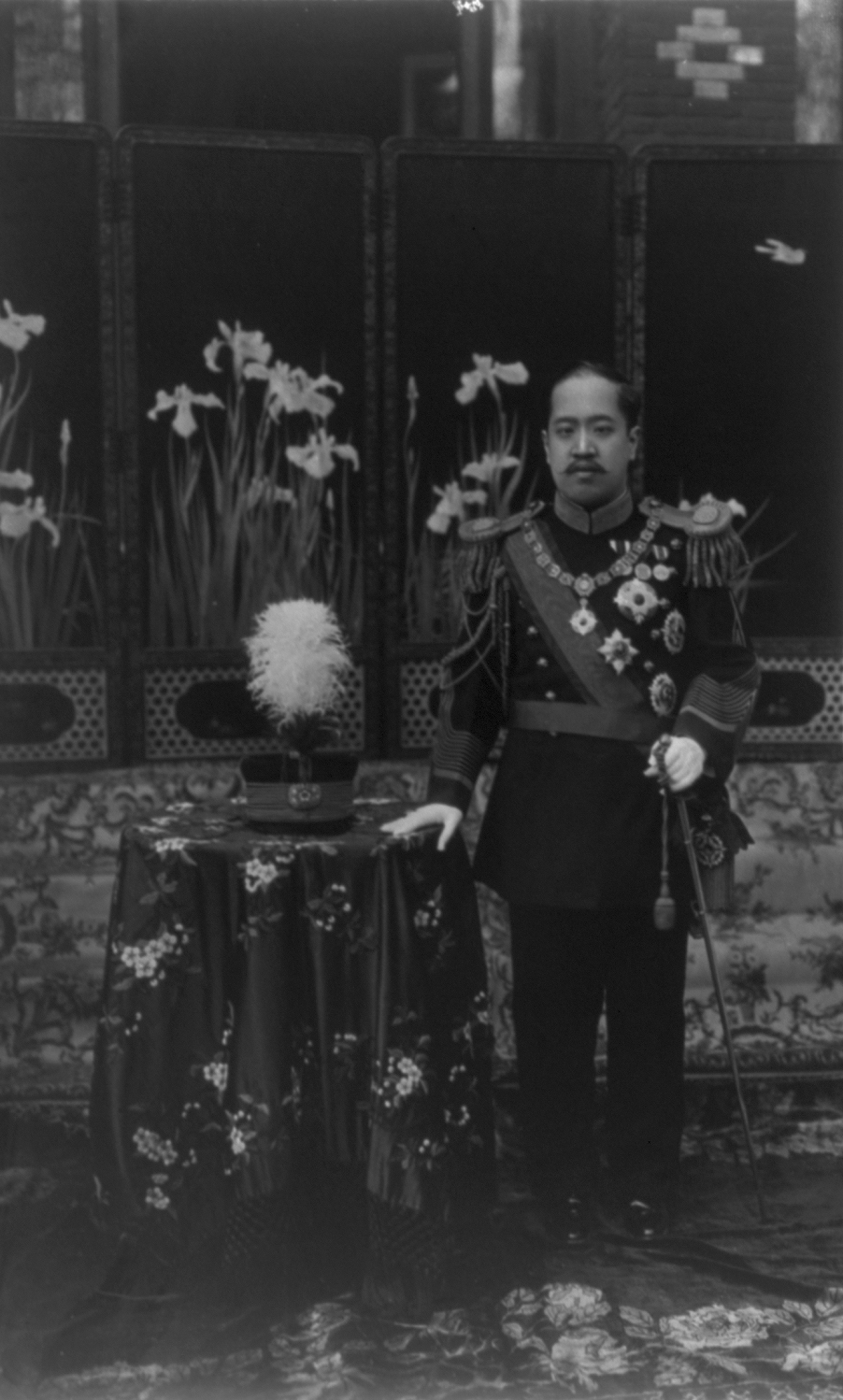
Sunjong wearing the court uniform of the Korean Empire and Japanese honors

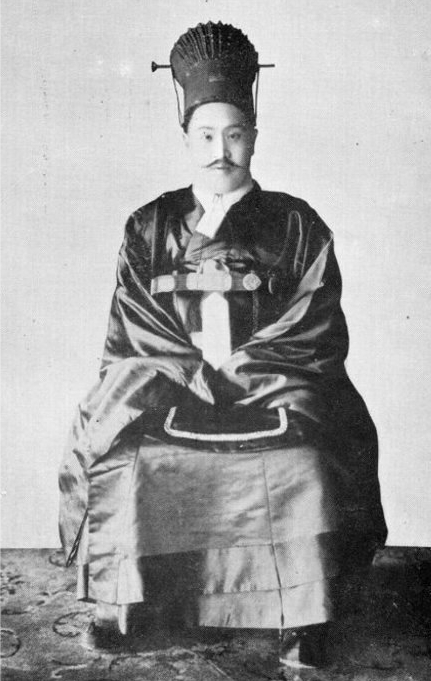
Sunjong in tongcheonggwan and gangsapo

== In popular culture ==
- Portrayed by Ahn Sang-woo in the 2016 film The Last Princess.

== See also ==
- History of Korea
- List of monarchs of Korea

== Notes ==
Sunjong of Korea House of Yi Born: 25 March 1874 Died: 25 April 1926
Royal titles
Preceded by Gojong	Emperor of Korea; 19 July 1907 – 29 August 1910	Monarchy abolished Annexed by Japan
