= Chungch'uwŏn =

1894–1907 legislature of the Korean Empire

Chungch'uwŏn 중추원
- Imperial Seal of the Korean Empire

Type
- Type: Unicameral house

History
- Established: 1894
- Disbanded: 1907
- Preceded by: Chungch'uwŏn
- Succeeded by: Chungch'uwŏn

Leadership
- Chairman
- Vice-chairman

Structure
- Political groups: Ch'ik'im Ŭigwan (Imperial Appointees)
- Political groups: Minsŏn Ŭigwan (Popularly Elected Members)

Constitution
- Constitution of the Korean Empire

The Chungch'uwŏn (Korean: 중추원; Hanja: 中樞院) was the legislature of Korea established during the Joseon and Korean Empire period, modeled after modern legislative bodies.

In 1894 (the 31st year of King Gojong's reign), its establishment was promoted as a modern administrative body intended to serve as an advisory council to the monarch. In 1896, due to demands from the Independence Club and the People's Joint Association for the participation of national representatives in politics, it was divided into ch'iksŏn members (imperial appointees) recommended by the Emperor and minsŏn members (popularly elected) chosen by the people. There were 25 k'wansŏn members appointed by the king/emperor and 75 minsŏn members elected by the populace from among distinguished individuals.

After the dissolution of the Independence Club and the Gwanmin Gongdonghoe in 1899, the Chungch'uwŏn was reduced to a merely formal advisory body to the Emperor.

It was entirely different in membership and character from the earlier Chungch'uwŏn (중추원; 中樞院) or Chungch'ubu (중추부; 中樞府) of the early Joseon period, which had managed the delivery of royal orders and the mobilisation of military forces, but in 1466 (the 12th year of King Sejo's reign) it was transformed into an honorary or concurrent post for current and former officials.

== Origins ==
The Chungch'uwŏn traces its origins to an early Joseon Dynasty institution of the same name (also known as Chungch'ubu), formally established in 1466 during King Sejo's reign. This early body operated primarily as a royal secretariat tasked with delivering royal orders and mobilizing military forces. Its membership included officials such as yŏngsa (chief councillor), p'ansa (vice councillor), chisa, tongjisa, ch'ŏmjisa, and kyŏngnyŏk.

After 1466, most of its duties were transferred to other institutions like the Sŭngjŏngwŏn (Royal Secretariat), the Ministry of War (Pyŏngjo), and various military commands and guards, leading to the Joseon Chungch'uwŏn to lose much of its functional authority.

== Modern establishment and background ==
In 1894, under the influence of the Kabo Reform and growing Japanese pressure, the modern Chungch'uwŏn was established by royal command as an advisory council to the monarch. The Gabo Reform aimed at administrative modernisation, including the separation of judicial and legislative functions.

Originally functioning as a consultative body to strengthen royal authority, the Chungch'uwŏn was reorganized into a quasi-legislative institution with decision-making powers following persistent demands from reformist groups such as the Independence Club and the People's Joint Association. These groups campaigned vigorously for a modern parliamentary system, popular elections, and greater political participation.

On June 28, 1894, the State Council (Ŭijŏngbu) released the “New Administrative System Proposal” (Sin'gwanjean), which included provisions regulating the Chungch'uwŏn's composition, stating that members were to be selected from persons holding the mun (civil), mu (military), or eum (hereditary) ranks of Jihyeon or higher, provided they held no official posts.

== Composition ==
The modern Chungch'uwŏn was fundamentally different in nature and membership from its Joseon predecessor. It consisted of:

- Ch'ikim Ŭigwan (Imperial Appointees): 25 members recommended directly by the Emperor.
- Minsŏn Ŭigwan (Popularly Elected Members): Between 50 and 75 representatives elected by the populace, mainly intellectuals from the jungin (middle class) or higher.

Although members were classified into first- and second-class ranks, the Chungch'uwŏn operated as a unicameral assembly rather than a bicameral legislature.

Its leadership structure included a chairman and two vice-chairmen (the number of vice-chairmen was increased to two in 1902 following a petition by Prime Minister Yun Yongsŏn).

== Dissolution ==
The Chungch'uwŏn persisted until 1910, when Korea lost its sovereignty following the Japan–Korea Annexation Treaty. With the establishment of the Japanese Government-General of Korea, the Korean Empire's institutions, including the Chungch'uwŏn, were abolished.

However, the Japanese colonial administration established its own advisory council also called the Chungch'uwŏn on October 1, 1910, under Imperial Ordinance No. 355. Unlike its predecessor, this colonial Chungch'uwŏn had no elections, no popularly nominated candidates, and no legislative authority, serving solely as a body to support Japanese colonial governance.

== See also ==
- Korean Empire
- Kabo Reform
- Japan–Korea Annexation Treaty
- People's Joint Association
- Gojong of Korea
