= 105-Man Incident =

1911 arrest of over 700 Koreans

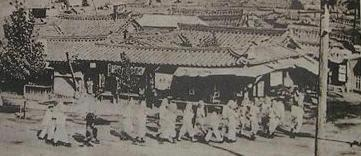
- Photo taken during the incident

Korean name
- Hangul: 105인 사건
- Hanja: 百五人事件
- RR: 105in sageon
- MR: 105in sakŏn

Alternate name
- Hangul: 선천 사건
- Hanja: 宣川事件
- RR: Seoncheon sageon
- MR: Sŏnch'ŏn sakŏn

The 105-Man Incident (Korean: 105인 사건; Hanja: 百五人事件) or Sŏnch'ŏn Incident (선천 사건; 宣川事件) was a 1911 incident in which 105 Koreans were sentenced to hard labor during the Japanese colonial period in Korea.

In 1911, after several alleged Korean attempts in 1910 to assassinate the Governor-General of Chōsen Terauchi Masatake, over 700 Koreans were arrested, many of whom were Christian. In 1912, the Governor-General sent 122 of those arrested to the Court of Justice, and 105 of them were sentenced to imprisonment with hard labor. In the end, only six Koreans had their sentences imposed, and even they were released in 1915 after being granted amnesty.

== Details ==
The incident began in Sonchon (Japanese reading "Sensen"), a coastal town in Heianhoku Province, Korea, Empire of Japan. On December 28, 1910, the American missionary George McCune met with Governor-General of Chōsen Terauchi. The Japanese claimed it was an assassination attempt and arrested over 700 Koreans starting in October 1911. Lead Christian members of Sinminhoe (a Korean independence movement) were specifically targeted in the arrests, and as a result, the organization was dissolved. In particular, notable activists Kim Ku, Cha Yi-seok, and Yang Jeon-baek were imprisoned. A trial of 123 defendants held on June 28, 1912, took place without evidence and confessions were extracted under torture. 105 were found to be guilty of treason and sentenced to forced labor.

=== Western View ===
Initially, westerners were accepting of the incident as they had a favorable view of the Japanese and thought it might be necessary in the time of change. However, when the missionaries began feeling victimized, they distanced themselves from the Japanese government and outside pressure finally forced them to grant amnesty to the prisoners in 1915. Missionaries in Korea and mission boards in New York believed the defendants innocent and lobbied diplomatically for a fair trial.

== See also ==
- An Chang-ho
- Yang Gi-tak
- Yun Chi-ho
- Lim Chi Jung
- Kim Ku
- Syngman Rhee
- Lee Donghui
- Masatake Terauchi
