= Min Yeong-chan =

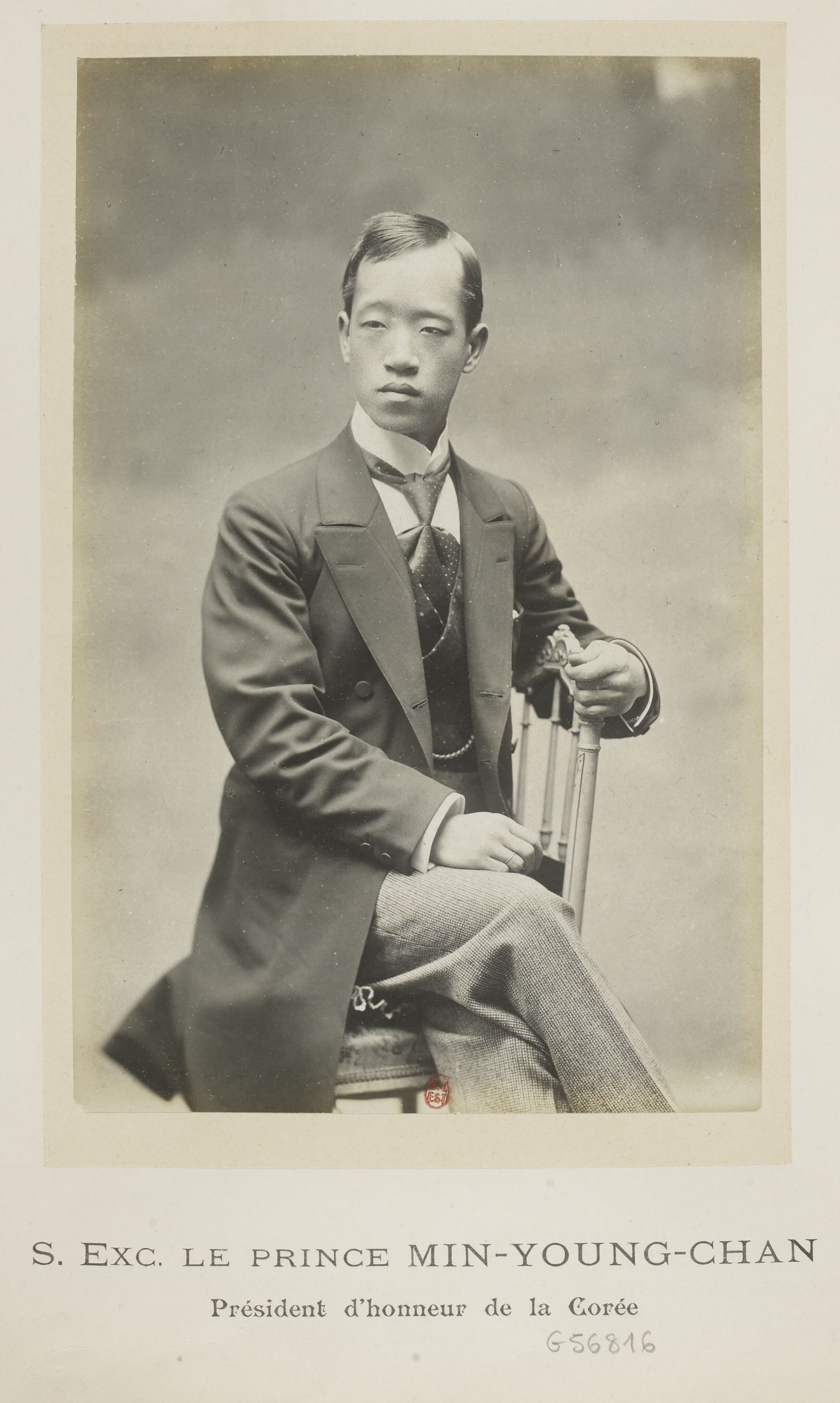
- Min Yeong-chan, ca. 1900

Korean name
- Hangul: 민영찬
- Hanja: 閔泳瓚
- RR: Min Yeongchan
- MR: Min Yŏngch'an

Courtesy name
- Hangul: 국보
- Hanja: 國寶
- RR: Gukbo
- MR: Kukpo

Min Yeong-chan (3 December 1873 – 16 November 1950), was scion of the powerful Min clan of the late Joseon period in Korea. Along with his elder brother Min Yeong-hwan, Yeong-chan served in a number of official positions towards the end of the Joseon dynasty. In 1900, he served as a Korean commissioner to the Paris Universal Exposition.

== Early life and education ==
Min Yeong-chan was born on 3 December 1873 into the Yeoheung Min clan to Min Gyeom-ho and Lady Seo. He was the younger brother of Min Yeong-hwan. The Min clan rose to great prominence and power with its royal alliance. As such, Min Yeong-chan received the best education studying alongside the future Emperor Sunjong.

For the Independence Club, Min was a favored politician. When he was appointed as the Vice Minister of Education, Philip Jaisohn assessed him as a helpful official with valuable experiences abroad.

== Career ==
In 1889, Min passed the national civil service exam and was then named to an official position in the Hongmungwan (홍문관, 弘文館), of Office of Special Advisors. In 1897, he was named vice-president of the Hanseong Bank Corporation. In 1900, Min served as royal commissioner to the Paris Universal Exposition.

He was promoted to Major General on 16 July 1904.

In April to May 1910, Min visited Japan for 20 days.

== Assessment ==
Min is characterized as one of the Korean collaborators with the Empire of Japan for his activity serving for Japanese during the colonial age.

== Family ==
- Father
  - Min Gyeom-ho (민겸호, 閔謙鎬; 1838 - 10 June 1882)
    - Aunt - Grand Internal Princess Consort Sunmok of the Yeoheung Min clan (순목대원비) (3 February 1818 - 8 January 1898)
      - Uncle - Grand Internal Prince Heungseon (흥선대원군) (24 January 1820 - 22 February 1898)
        - Cousin - Yi Jae-myeon, Prince Imperial Heung (흥친왕 이재면, 興親王 李載冕) (22 August 1845 - 9 September 1912)
        - Cousin - Emperor Gojong of Korea (대한제국 고종) (8 September 1852 - 21 January 1919)
- Mother
  - Lady Seo of the Dalseong Seo clan (정경부인 달성 서씨; 徐氏; 1837–1885)
- Sibling(s)
  - Older brother - Min Yeong-hwan (민영환, 閔泳煥; 7 August 1861 - 30 November 1905)
  - Younger sister - Lady Min (민씨; 1876 - ?)
- Wives and issue(s):
  - Lady Kang of the Geumcheon Kang clan (금천 강씨, 衿川 姜氏); from Korea
    - Son - Min Jun-sik (민준식; 1893–1933)
      - Daughter-in-law - Lady Yun (윤씨; 1892 - 1947)
        - Adoptive Grandson - Min Byeong-ik (민병익; 1917 - ?); son of Min Hong-sik
    - Son - Min Hong-sik (민홍식, 閔弘植; 1895–1956)
      - Daughter-in-law - Lady Hwang of the Changwon Hwang clan (창원 황씨, 昌原 黃氏; 5 December 1894 – 22 May 1914); Min Hong-sik's first wife
      - Daughter-in-law - Lady Yi (이씨) (1897 - ?)
        - Grandson - Min Byeong-ik (민병익) (1917 - ?)
        - Granddaughter - Lady Min (민씨) (1920 - ?)
    - Daughter - Lady Min (민씨; 1901 - ?)
      - Son-in-law - Seo Jeong-ik (서정식; 1901–?)
        - Granddaughter - Lady Seo (서씨)
  - Lady Meiri of the Hu clan (후메이리, 胡美梨); from China
