= Min Yŏnghwan =

Korean politician and general (1861–1905)

Min Yŏnghwan 민영환
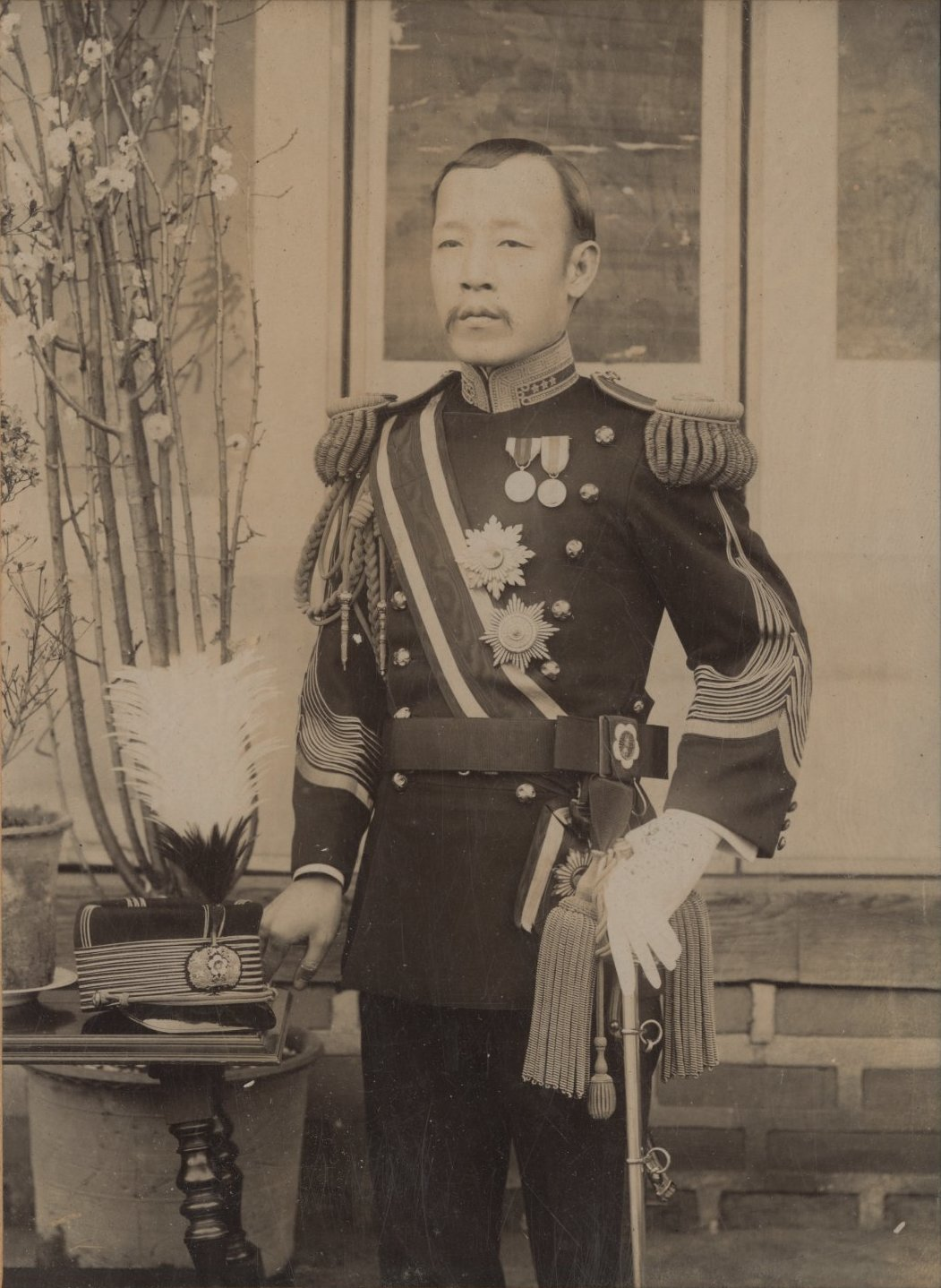
- Portrait of Min Young Hwan

Minister of Military
- In office 12 November 1896 – 19 January 1897
- Monarch: Gojong of Korea
- Preceded by: Yi Yun-yong
- Succeeded by: Shim Sang-hun (Acting)

Minister of Interior
- In office 1 March 1904 – 8 March 1904
- Monarch: Gojong of Korea
- Preceded by: Shim Sang-hun
- Succeeded by: Yi Geun-myeong

Minister of Education
- In office 8 March 1904 – 25 May 1904
- Monarch: Gojong of Korea
- Preceded by: Yi Yong-jik
- Succeeded by: Yi Jaek-guk

Personal details
- Born: 7 August 1861 Seoul, Joseon
- Died: 30 November 1905 (aged 44) Seoul, Korean Empire
- Relations: Younger Brother: Min Yeong-chan
- Occupation: Korean politician and general
- Awards: Order of the Golden Ruler (Posthumously)

Military service
- Years of service: 1896–1905
- Rank: Lieutenant General

Korean name
- Hangul: 민영환
- Hanja: 閔泳煥
- RR: Min Yeonghwan
- MR: Min Yŏnghwan

Art name
- Hangul: 계정
- Hanja: 桂庭
- RR: Gyejeong
- MR: Kyejŏng

Courtesy name
- Hangul: 문약
- Hanja: 文若
- RR: Munyak
- MR: Munyak

Posthumous name
- Hangul: 충정
- Hanja: 忠正
- RR: Chungjeong
- MR: Ch'ungjŏng

Min Yŏnghwan (Korean: 민영환; Hanja: 閔泳煥; 7 August 1861 – 30 November 1905) was a politician, diplomat, and general of the Korean Empire and known as a conservative proponent for reform. He was born in Seoul into the powerful Yeoheung Min clan which Heungseon Daewongun hated, and committed suicide as an act of resistance against the Eulsa Treaty imposed by Japan on Korea. He is remembered today for his efforts on behalf of Korean independence in the waning days of the Joseon period.

== Biography ==
=== Early life ===
On 7 August 1861, Min was born in to the Yeoheung Min clan. Min's father, Min Gyeom-ho (민겸호; 閔謙鎬) was the Minister of Finance (Hojo). Min Yŏnghwan passed the Gwageo literary examination in 1878 and thereupon entered into government service as a junior librarian in the Royal Library (Gyujanggak).

Min continued to rise through the ranks of Joseon officialdom, holding a succession of posts including a position in the Office of Special Advisors (Hongmungwan 弘文館) and tutor to the Crown Prince. Min was one of the favorite officials of the King, being posted to numerous important posts. However, during the Imo Incident, Min's father was killed by the followers of Daewongun, an event that led Min to resign to mourn for his loss. In fact, his aversion of the ancient military systems also contributed to the leaving of Min. In 1884, Min reentered public service and was appointed an official of the Board of Personnel (Ijo 吏曹).

In March 1886, Min was ordered to secure Korea's independence by borrowing Russia's influence to check Qing's increasing influence. With Gaehwa Party, Min attempted to sign Second Choseon-Russia Secrete Agreement to achieve the King's will; however, this conspiracy was spotted by Min Young-ik, and Yuan Shikai. Such efforts made Li Hongzhang to consider even the abdication of Korean king. Gojong's plan thus failed, and Gaewha politicians, such as Gim Ga-jin and Gim Hak-wu, were banished. Even still, he did not find himself being punished. Despite all, at a young age, Min rose into power as Minister of Yejo in 1887, and Minister of Military in 1888 and 1890 respectively for him enjoying the love of the king.

Over the course of his career, Min actively led the modernization of Joseon. In an attempt to build a modernized navy, Min established Choseon navy or Gi Yeon Hae Bang Young and employed an American navy instructor. In 1893, Min became the Justice Minister (刑曹判書), and in November of that year, Min was appointed as Mayor of Seoul (漢城府判尹).

During the Donghak Peasant Revolution, Min was appointed as Byeol Ip-jik on 14 September 1894 (Lunar Calendar). Min aimed to suppress the revolution by stabilising public, arresting revolutionists, providing enough supplies to the Government army, and protecting government offices. Due to his harsh reactions, Min was hated by the revolutionists. Jeon Bongjun, who was the leader of the Donghak, denounced Min as being one of the most corrupted officials in the government with Min Young-jun, (Note: Later Min Young-hwi) and Go Young-gun. After the Revolution, in 1895, Min was appointed as a minister to the United States. However, the murder of the Queen, by Japanese troops in October 1895, prevented him from taking the post.

=== Portrait by Henry Savage-Landor ===
In his Korean travel memoirs published in 1895, the artist A. Henry Savage-Landor records an interview and sketch portrait sitting by Min, known (in English) as Prince Min-Yŏnghwan. At that time the Prince was Commander-in-chief of the army, and extended courtesy and gifts to the artist.

=== Visits to Europe ===
On 3 April 1896, Min was appointed as special minister to Russia to participate in the coronation of Czar Nicholas II. Min received 20,000 Dollars from the Korean government for journey and embarked on ship named Empress on 11 April in Incheon. As a member of the Jeong-Deong Club, Min was familiarized with many foreigners in Korea, while being a moderate and loyal politician in the government; these traits made Min the perfect candidate to be sent to Russia for a diplomatic mission. Upon arriving Yokohama on 16 April, they visited Korean Legation and sailed to Canada, and on 29 April, they arrived at Vancouver. On 5 May, they arrived in Montreal. Afterwards, they visited New York City and embarked RMS Lucania. After 7 days of sailing, Min's delegation arrived in Liverpool. Next day, they arrived at the Berlin Friedrichstraße station; then by 8:00 AM on 18 May, they reached Warsaw. They were welcomed by military officers in there. On 19 May, they got on a train to Moscow, and finally arrived at Moscow on 20 May. Next day, Min visited the Palace of the Governor of Moscow. On 22 May, Min visited the Czar. Min gave the letter of Korean king to the Czar. The Czar answered to Min, "Whenever it shall please your Majesty to inquire into the affairs of Corea, the Envoy extraordinary, is prepared and authorized by his government to present to Your Majesty in full the condition and needs of Corea." To contact with Russian politicians, Min visited Saint Petersburg. There, he met Aleksey Lobanov-Rostovsky, the Minister of Foreign Affairs, and gave the five requests of the Korean government. The five requests were the following:

1. Guard for the protection of the King until the Corean army be drilled into a reliable force.
2. Military instructors
3. Advisors: One for the Royal Household to be near the King; one for the Ministry; one for mines, railroads, etc.
4. Telegraphic connections between Russia and Corea on terms beneficial to both―An expert in telegraphic matters.
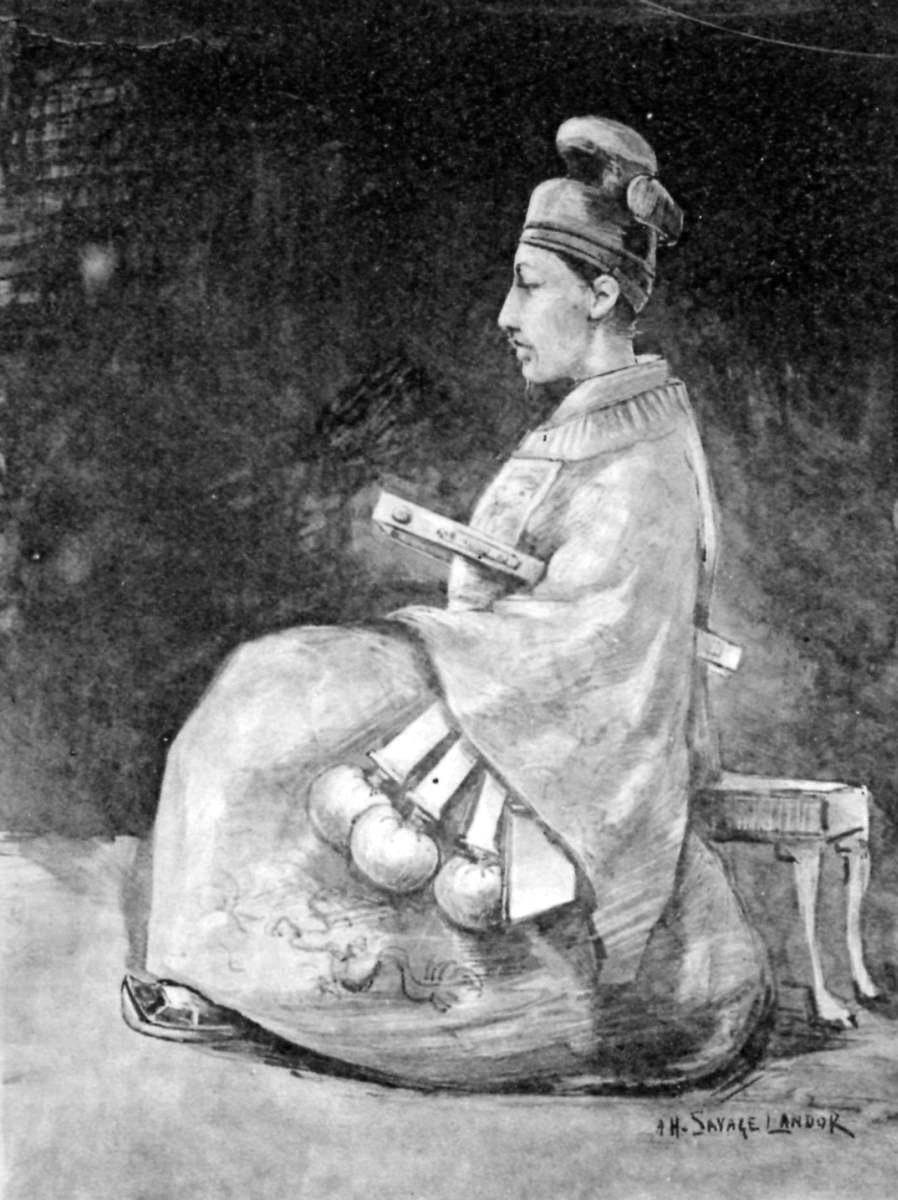
5. Portrait sketch by A. Henry Savage-Landor (published 1895). The Prince was in mourning and secretly, with the King's permission, laid aside the mandatory white so he could be portrayed in blue robes.
  A loan of 3 million Yen to cancel the Japanese debt.

On 13 June, Min received answers from Lobanov. Lobanov answered that providing guards for the Korean King will not be possible because of predictable conflicts with English or German, but agreed with sending an economy instructor for paying off debt, establishing telephone lines and sending military inspectors. Even though Russia showed a half-hearted answer to Korea, Min brought 13 Russian military instructors to Korea. These instructors were contract workers of the Joseon Government with three years of service. After receiving answer from Lobanov, Min's delegation stayed in Russia until August and inspected Russian facilities, including military bases, courts, prisons, schools, and military bases. Then, they returned to Korea through Novgorod, Irkutsk, Khabarovsk, and Vladivostok, finally returning on 21 October 1896 and gave the letter of Nicholas II to Gojong in Russian legation. Soon after his return, Min got interviewed by the Tongnip sinmun, in which he said that the trip to Europe made him a new man. He proclaimed his full devotion of doing anything for the reform of Korea. The newspaper noted that Min had three accomplishments: strengthening amicable relationship with Russia, advertising independence of Korea, and bringing Russian instructors. Despite all that, Min himself was regretting for not completely getting consent for the other three rejected request (advisors, telegraphic connections, and loans), according to Yun Chi-ho who accompanied through all the journey. Even still, Koreans were happy for the aforementioned accomplishments done by Min not frustrated by the failure of him.

Right after the journey, on 12 November 1896, Min was appointed as Lieutenant general and Minister of Military. Min successfully brought the Russian instructors to Korea on 26 October 1896. As such, Min was expected to be a great military leader to modernise the Korean army. These Russian instructors trained about 800 guards, which helped Gojong to return to the palace from the Russian legation.

Other than the military reform, Min was also active in commemoration of Korean Army. Min, as the minister, was active with commemorating the deceased personnels of Korea during various events. On 19 January 1897, Min arranged a traditional memorial ceremony in Cheon Nyeon Jong.

However, Min's term as the minister of military was ephemeral. He had conflicts with Colonel Dmitry Putyata (the leader of the Russian instructors): Putyata complained Min's incapacity for numerous times. Furthermore, Min's excessively radical reforms such as requiring short hairstyle made him unpopular among conservatives and the emperor himself. Min ended up resigning the post on 15 January 1897.

On 11 January 1897, Min was again sent to Europe as Korean minister plenipotentiary to the Diamond Jubilee of Queen Victoria and received 40,000 Dollars from the Government as the expense for his trip. Another order that Min received from the government was to sign a secrete treaty with France and Germany for the protection of Korean autonomy. Min traveled to Saint Petersburg to persuade Russian government prolonging the term of Karl Ivanovich Weber, repeal Weber's appointment as Russian envoy to Mexico, and organize a secrete treaty between Russia and Korea. However, the Minister of Foreign Affairs of Russia did not agree with Min's requests. Finally, on 5 June, Min arrived at London and joined Min Sang-ho next day. The two, however, were rejected from the British government. British secretary attached to Min, Cavendish, reported this fact to British financial instructor Brown and supposed that this failure was because of Min's younger brother Min Yeong-chan whom he assessed as the most unpleasant person. Even worse, Min failed to sign treaties with France and Germany, bringing no diplomatic success from the trip. Without finishing his duty, Min abruptly left Europe on 17 July 1897 and traveled to America, which delayed deployment of Russian instructors in Korea. The Korean government was furious about Min's failure that they halted their financial support to him and Min Sang-ho; Gojong, furthermore, removed him from his position on 30 July 1897.

=== Korean Empire and suicide ===
Upon his return to Korea, Min became a fervent supporter of the Independence Club and was interviewed by its newspaper The Independent (Dongnip Sinmun 獨立新聞). Two diplomatic trips to Europe made Min to be deeply engage in Gwangmu Reform. Despite his numerous request many reforms, only some (mostly about military) were actually executed. After Bak Jeongyang cabinet was formed, Min returned to the Korean politics as a Special official of Gungnaebu. Then, Min rose into the power as Minister of Military and Interior on 12 October 1898. Min initiated military reform, starting with ordering all officers and soldiers to wear military uniforms on 14 October 1898. On 5 November 1898, Min founded Heunghwa School arguing that people should import Western culture. On 4 December 1898, Min became Chamjung of State Council of Korean Empire, and Minister of Economy on 20 December 1898. Min averred the reason why tax was not collected was because local officials are corrupted, and tried to stop the corruption of the local officials. However, as the emperor started to oppress the liberal faction of Korea, Min, as a liberal politician, saw his positioned being threatened. Min lost his fell from the power and was replaced by conservative politicians. On 15 March 1899, Min was appointed as envoy reside in America. On 19 February 1900, Min became head of accounting of the Board of Marshals, and for his service as the head of accounting of the Board of Marshals, Min received 1st Class of the Order of the Taegeuk. He was posted as the military police commander from 2 August 1900, and on 9 August Min was appointed as President of the Pyeo-hun Won.

During that time, Min continued on to support the reform-favoring faction. For instance, in 1902, Min established Reform party with Yi Dong-hwi. The party succeeded the Independence Club as the reforming fraction of Imperial Korea.

Min became the Minister of Education on 8 March 1904. As the Minister of Education, Min criticized the neglected ministry. He started his efforts to revolutionize the Korean officialdom from education, suggesting the appointment of government officials among the graduates of public schools and graduates of private school should enter the officialdom with an exam. The reform that Min desired to bring was planned to be a gradual change in 3 or 4 years. Moreover, he advised every children to attend school. However, on May 25, Min resigned from his post of Minister of Education and was appointed as head of accounting of the Board of Marshals on 26 May 1904. His opposition against the Japan–Korea Treaty of February 1904 made Min to be posted as the chief of equerry, which was a comparably less-significant one. Opposing the pro-Japanese cabinet, Min continued to serve as leisurely posts; moreover, Min experienced conflict with the pro-Japanese organization Iljinhoe. On 26 March 1905, Min was appointed as the prime minister following the resignation of Cho Byeong-shik. As the prime minister, Min restrict the prevalent usage of illegal shamanism by implementing police forces to do so. However, he was removed from his post on 4 April 1905 and became chief of equerry on June 24. Despite being politically oppressed by the Pro-Japanese cabinet, Min reiterated the message of Korean independence. Min recommended Han Kyu-seol as the next prime minister in order to prevent Korea being Japanese protectorship. As a response, Min and Han sent Syngman Rhee to America to claim the independence of Korea.

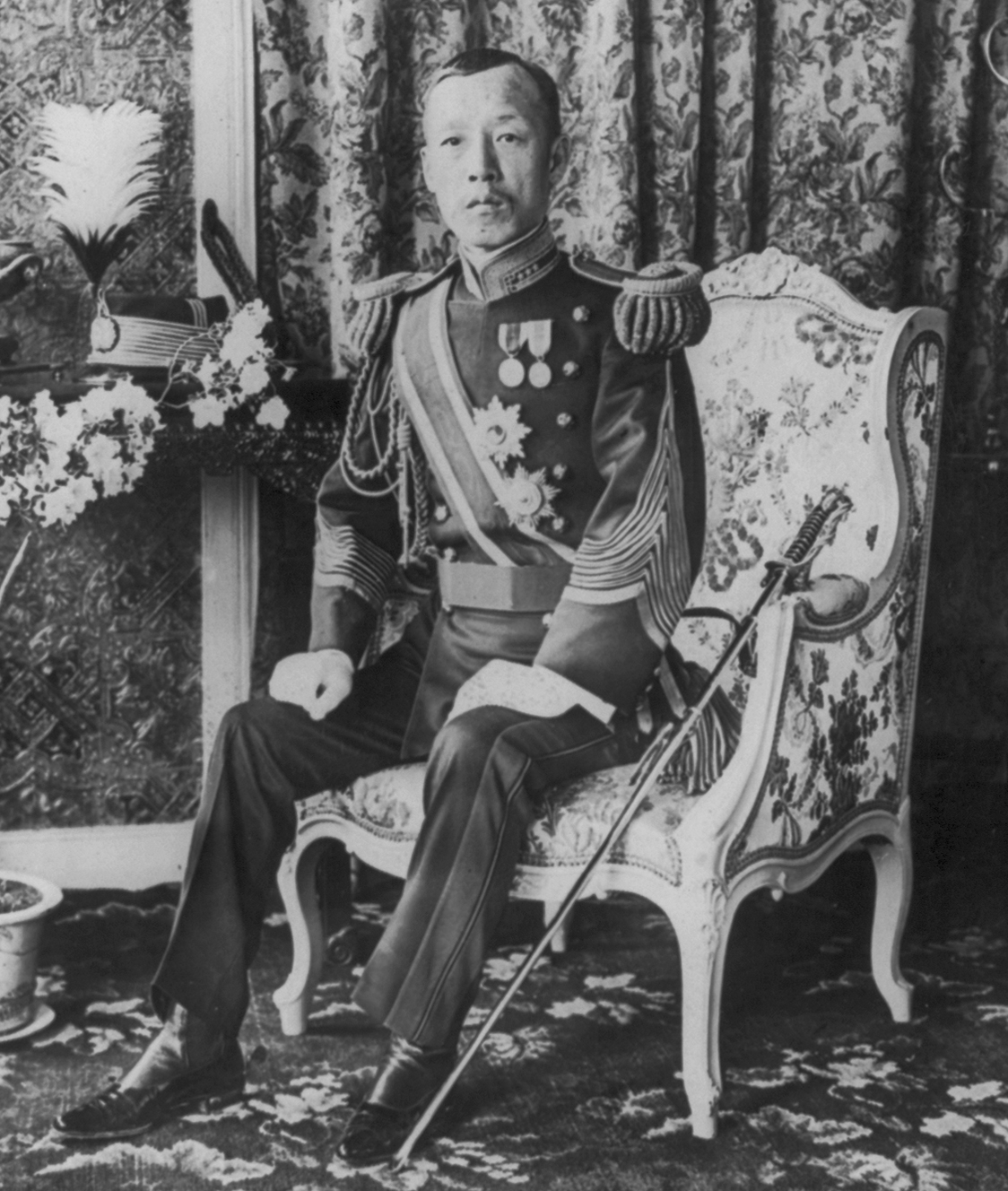
Min Yŏnghwan in his dress uniform

On November 17, 1905, Japan succeeded in foisting upon Korea the Eulsa Treaty making Korea a Japanese protectorship. It is said that upon hearing of the treaty three days after it had been concluded, Min "fainted several times and vomited blood". Min pleaded with Emperor Gojong to annul the treaty and execute the five Korean officials who had signed it, now widely referred to as the "Five Traitors of Eulsa" (Eulsa ojeok). Even though the emperor made the appealing the punishments for the five traitors illegal, Min did not follow the order and asked again on 29 November 1905. He and Jo Byeong-se, who asked the Emperor with Min, waited for the Emperor's answers in Dae Ahan gate of the Deoksugung. The Japanese military police imprisoned Min and Jo in Pyeong-li won, the supreme court of Imperial Korea. After being released, Min realised that he should commit suicide. He returned to house of Yi Won-sik, and committed suicide there with a small knife. That night, Min attempted twice to commit suicide: first trial, however, was unsuccessful because the knife was too short to kill him. It was his second trial that was actually successful. After this death, in his pockets were found five identical messages on the back of his calling cards to the representatives of China, Great Britain, the United States, France, and Germany in which he pleaded with those powers to recognize the true situation within Korea. He also left a final message directed towards the people of Korea (see below), in which he promised to help his fellow countrymen "from the nether world" if they would strengthen their collective will and spirit and exercise their learning in an all out effort to "restore our [Korean] freedom and independence." Min received a state funeral from the government, in which about 6,000 to 7,000 people attended his funeral, and thousands of people mourned for his death. Yun Chi-ho wrote the following about Min's death: "Min Yong Whan committed suicide. I wish he had died fighting, if he had decided to die. All honors to his calm courage. All honors to his patriotism. All honors to his heroic death. His death will do more good than his life."

== After death ==
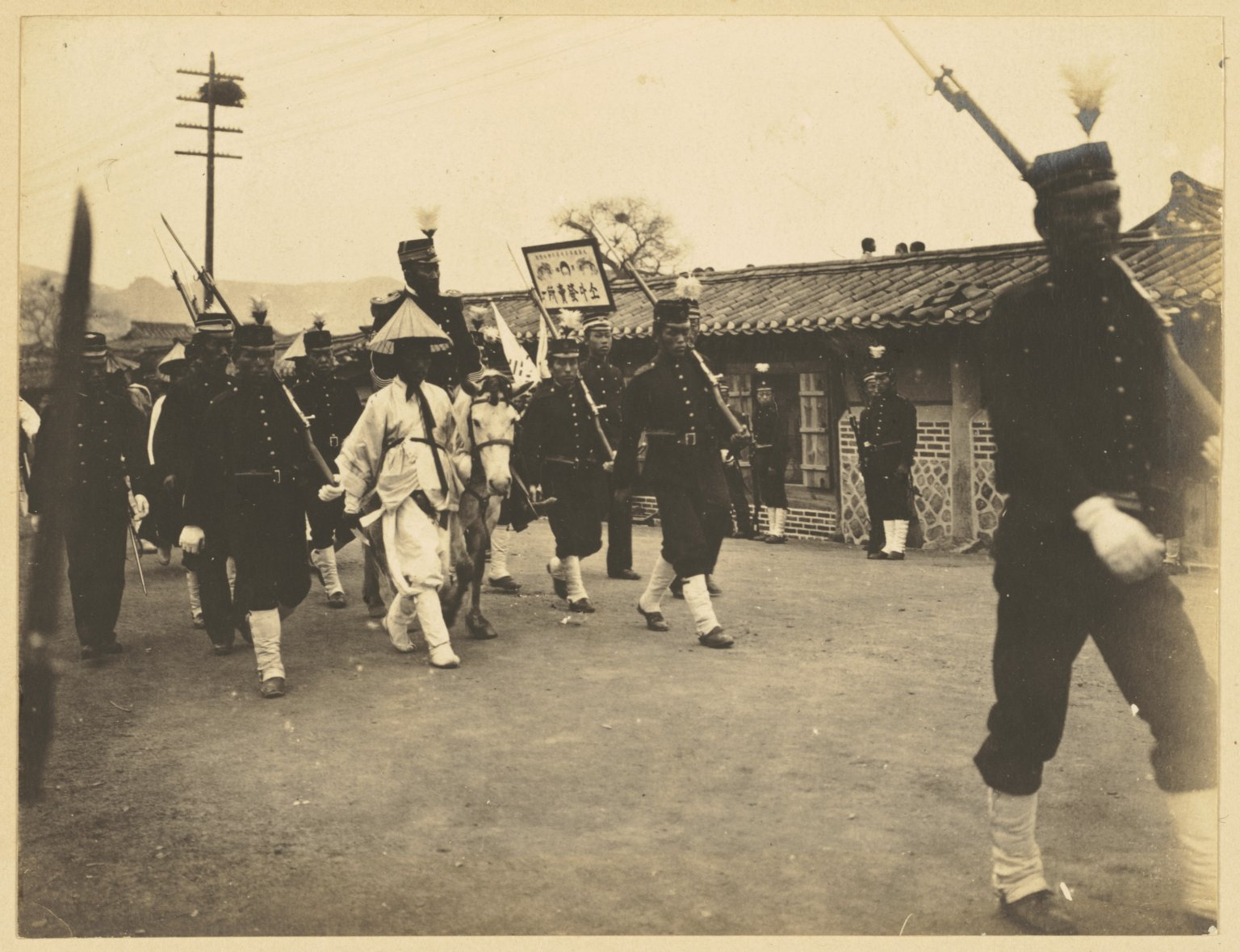
State funeral of Min Yŏnghwan

Some officials, including Jo Byeongse, and his rickshaw puller, committed suicide following Min's death.

Min was posthumously appointed as Dae-Gwang-Bo-Guk-Seung-Rok Dae-bu(大匡輔國崇祿大夫), the highest rank in the Korean officialdom. Gojong gave him posthumous name "Chung mun", and Order of the Golden Ruler for his honour to the country. His posthumous name was revised to "Chung jeong" on 3 December 1905. He was buried in Yongin. Min was enshrined in the Jongmyo on 16 February 1921.

After the independence of Korea, Min was commemorated as one of the zealot in December 1945. According to a survey done to Korean students in 1952, Min was one of the most respected historical figures along with Sejong the Great, and Yi Sun-sin. In 1962, Min posthumously awarded the Order of Merit for National Foundation by the South Korean government.

== Reforms ==
His journey to Europe made him to have a great desire of reforming his country. For this reason, Min was supported by Independence Club and acted as one of the key ministers of Gwangmu Reform.

=== Military reforms and political reforms ===
Since Min visited many European countries and witnessed their military system, he was considered as the best man to mobilise the Imperial Korean Army by Europeans. However, Min did not met the expectations after he was appointed as minister of military. He brought Russian military instructors to modernise the army in 1896 and was appointed as Minister of Military right after returning from russia. However, min was criticized by Russian officers that he did not met the expectation. Even not meeting the expectation, Min still knew that the military system of Joseon should be modernised, and tried to carry on military reforms. He engaged in the establishment of Military Academy of Korean Empire. He contributed to the augment of the Qinwidae, establishment of the Siwidae, the military band and the Board of Marshals. In 1904, Min was appointed as one of the Editors of Military system, even though it was a military reform led by Imperial Japan to check the growing of Imperial Korean Army.

Min wrote the lyrics for the national anthem of the Korean Empire. He also tried to increase the authority of the Emperor by making an ensign of Emperor, Crown Prince, and Princes. Simultaneously, Min supported Korean parliament, Jungchuwon, which weakened the authority of the Emperor. When government led by Bak Jeongyang and Min was formed on 13 October 1897, after days of protests of the Independence Club, the government started to actually establish a parliament. However, the emperor checked the reform advocating government officials, such as Min, by posting pro-Russian, conservative officials in important positions. As a result of these efforts of Min, Bak, and members of the Independence Club, a proper parliament, Jungchuwon was established.

=== Supporting Independence Club ===
Min was a great supporter of the Independence Club. He was part of the club from when it was Jeongdong Club, with Yun Chi-ho, Ye Wanyong, Yi Sang-jae, and Soh Jaipil. From many travels around the world, Min realised the need of the Joseon to reform its system. Because of this, Min had conflicts with the Hwangguk Club, a conservative club of Korea which hated Independence club, and members of Hwangguk Club even tried to murder Min. Min's support of Independence Club made him to fall from power when Independence Club was dissolved by false rumors of their political rivals.

=== Education ===
Min stressed the importance of education. He investigated some schools with his own property. He established a western school named Heunghwa school. Min was the first principal of the school. The school grew larger because it was the only school with night-time courses. However, the excessive influx of students also led to a financial hardship, which led the school's dissolvement in 1911.

== Blood Bamboo ==
One year after Min's death, it was widely reported that a bamboo plant appeared where his bloody clothes had been laid. Many people thought the bamboo grew nurtured by Min's blood so that the bamboo was called Hyeoljuk (血竹), or "Blood Bamboo". Mysteriously, the number of its leaves was 45, Min's age at the time of his death.

== Assessment ==
Horace Newton Allen wrote, "Min Yong Whan. Formerly known as the Good Min, latterly somewhat disappointing. Good intentions but feeble and vacillating. Ostensibly the present head of the Min clan," about Min.

Willard Dickerman Straight described Min as a righteous man who died for the cause of justice.

A statue to his memory now stands on a traffic island near Chungjeongno Intersection, his namesake, after having previously been located at Anguk Intersection in 1957, before being moved due to road widening to near Donhwa Gate of Changdeok Palace in 1970 where it was criticized for not matching the surroundings, and then near the General Post Office next to Jogye Temple in 2003, where it was reportedly neglected until 2022.

== Gallery ==
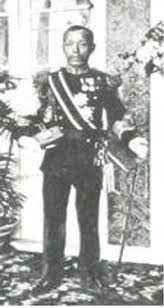
Min Yŏnghwan in his dress uniform

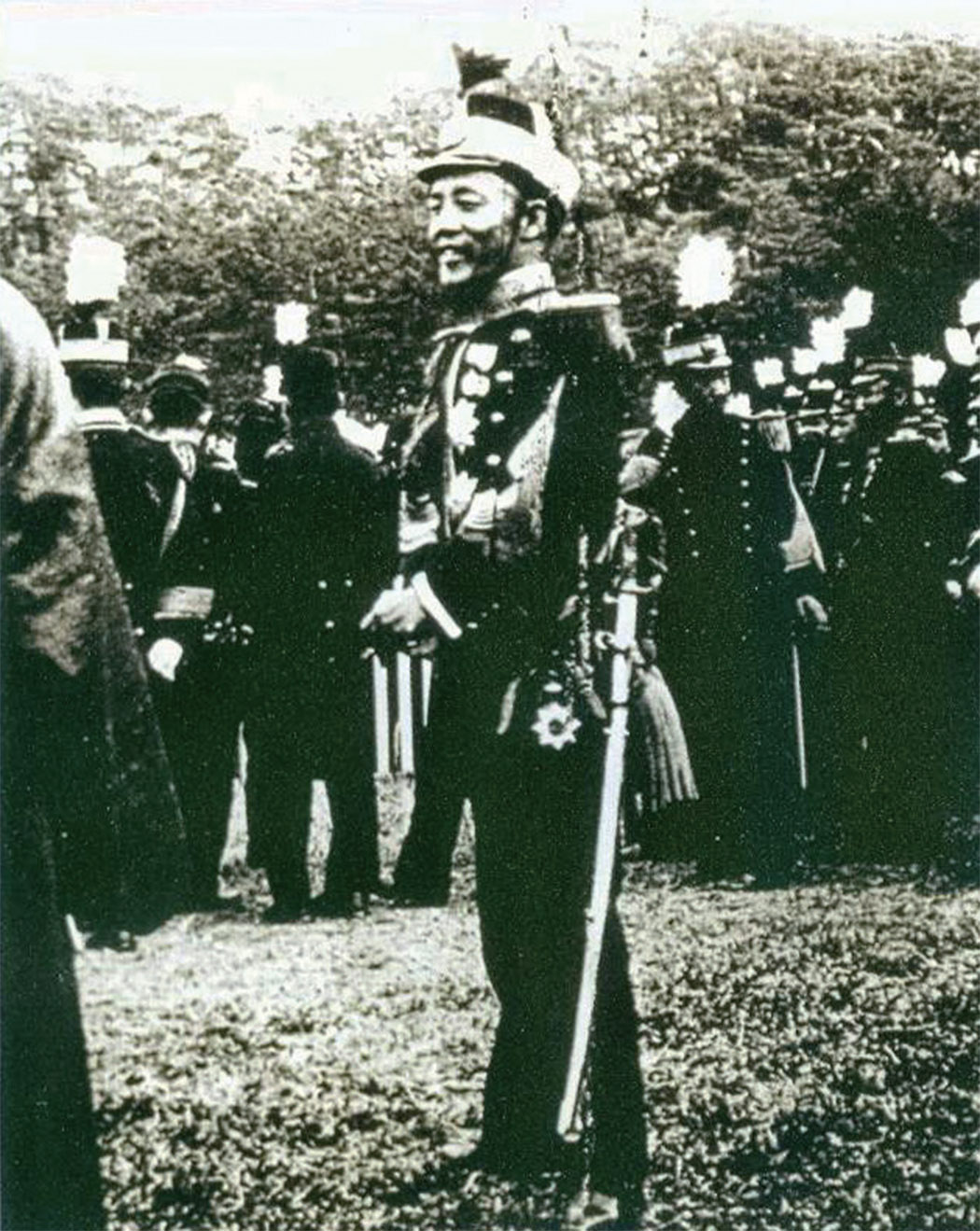
Min Yŏnghwan in his dress uniform and sabre

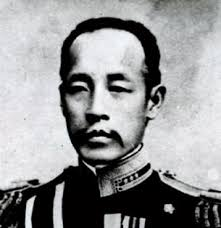
Min Yŏnghwan photo

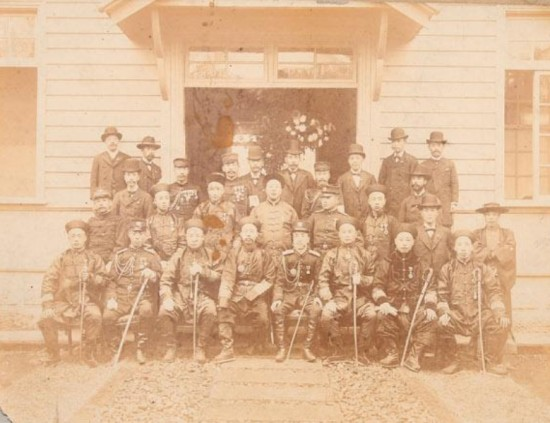
Min Yŏnghwan in 1902 at military conference in Kumamoto

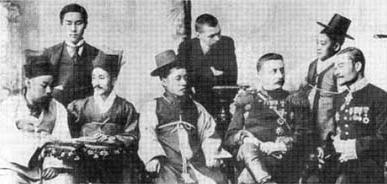
Min during his journey to Coronation of Nicholas II of Russia

== Family ==
- Father
  - Biological - Min Gyeom-ho (민겸호; 閔謙鎬; 1838 – 10 June 1882)
  - Adoptive - Min Tae-ho (민태호; 閔泰鎬; 1828–1868)
- Mother
  - Biological - Lady Seo of the Dalseong Seo clan (정경부인 달성 서씨; 徐氏; 1837–1885)
  - Adoptive - Lady Kim of the Yeonan Kim clan (증 정경부인 연안 김씨; 1827–1891)
- Sibling(s)
  - Adoptive older sister - Lady Min of the Yeoheung Min clan (여흥 민씨; 驪興 閔氏; 1859–1954)
  - Younger brother - Min Yeong-chan (민영찬; 閔泳瓚; 1873–1948)
- Wives and their children
  - Lady Kim of the Andong Kim clan (안동 김씨, 安東 金氏; 1861–1893); daughter of Kim Myeong-jin (김명진; 1840–1890)
  - Park Su-yeong, Lady Park of the Bannam Park clan (박수영 반남 박씨; 1875–1947); daughter of Park Yong-hun (박용훈)
    - Daughter - Lady Min of the Yeoheung Min clan (여흥 민씨; 1896–?)
    - Son - Min Beom-sik (민범식; 閔範植; 1899–1934)
    - Daughter - Min Gye-sik (민계식), Lady Min of the Yeoheung Min clan (여흥 민씨; 1902–3 August 1938)
    - Son - Min Jang-sik (민장식; 閔章植; 1904–1961)
    - Son - Min Gwang-sik (민광식; 閔光植; 1905–1961)
  - Yi Ja-seong (이자성; 李自成), Lady Yi of the Gwangju Yi clan (광주 이씨; 廣州 李氏; 1877–?); daughter of Yi Eun-hui (이은희; 1839–1913)

== Popular culture ==
- Played by Choe Jang-so in the 1984 North Korean film An Emissary of No Return.
- Portrayed by Jo Seung-yeon in the 2012 film Gabi.

== Honours ==
Korean Empire

- Order of the Golden Ruler (Posthumously) on 1 December 1905
- Order of the Plum Blossom on 16 September 1904
- Order of the Taeguk 1st Class on 22 April 1900

=== Foreign awards ===
Russian Empire

- Order of the White Eagle on 24 October 1896

Japanese Empire

- Order of the Rising Sun 1st Class on 30 March 1904

== Notes ==
Political offices
Preceded by Cho Pyeong-sik	Prime Minister of the Korean Empire; 26 March 1905–6 April 1905	Succeeded by Shim Sang-hun
