= People's Joint Association =

1897 Korean independence organization

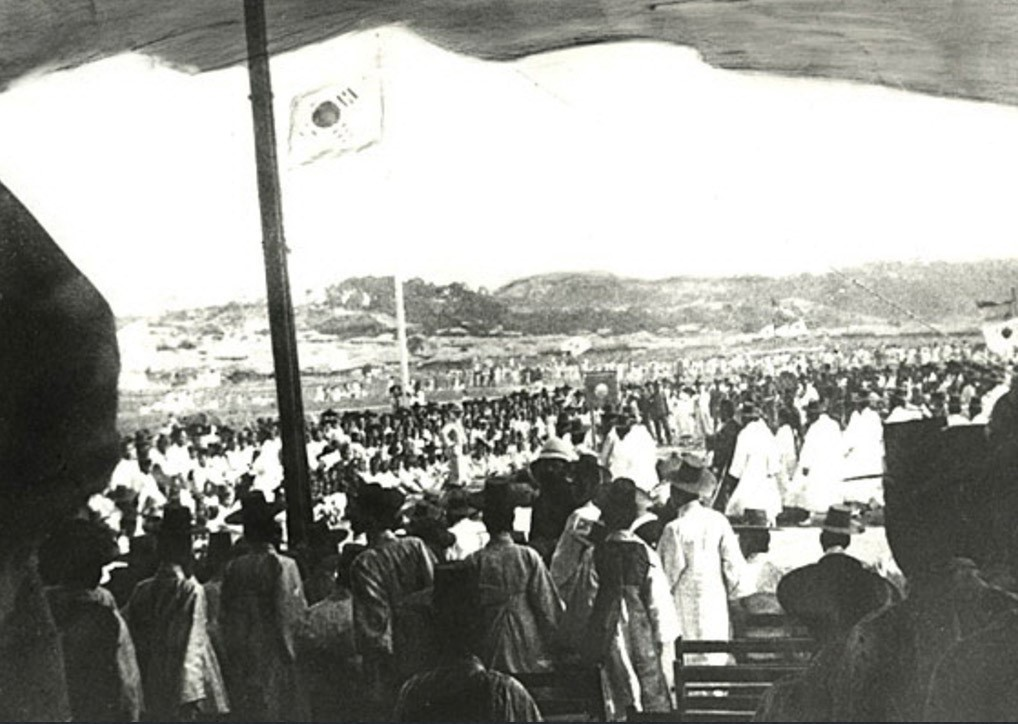
- Meeting of the People's Joint Association
- Formation: 1897
- Founded at: Jongno District, Seoul, Joseon
- Dissolved: 1899
- Parent organization: Independence Club

Korean name
- Hangul: 만민공동회, 관민공동회
- Hanja: 萬民共同會, 官民共同會
- RR: Manmin gongdonghoe, Gwanmin gongdonghoe
- MR: Manmin kongdonghoe, Kwanmin kongdonghoe

The People's Joint Association was a mass organization started in 1897 of Korean independence activists in the Korean Empire. It was done as part of Independence Club.

The first People's Joint Association was a congress was held by the Independence Club, and the later part of the congress was Korean peoples autonomy. Its founders were Philip Jaisohn, Yun Chi-ho, and Lee Sang-jae.

== Description ==
Manmingongdonghoi's vip members were Philip Jaisohn, Yu Gil-chun, Yun Chi-ho, Ahn Chang-ho, Lee Sang-jae, Syngman Rhee.

Manmingongdongheo was first held on 1896. On 10 March 1897, they criticised the Russian intervention. Ten thousand Seoul citizens attended the congress. Within ten days, the Korean Empire government agreed to the decisions of Manmingongdonghoe and Russia conceded to Korean order. The congress grew more and more, and insisted on various rights of people and protection of concessions from the great Powers.

Gojong ordered Lee Jong-gun, special officer of Gungnaebu to dissolve the joint but, Lee participated in it and became a member.

first congress was Independence Club also latter part congress was Korean peoples autonomy.

On 12 October, the congress succeed in founding a reform-minded government composed of innovative officials such as Mihn Yong-hwan and Park Jeong-yang. The new government agreed to establish a national assembly. However pro-Russians and conservatives who hated Manmingongdonghoe, spread a rumor that the congress will revolt and expel Emperor Gojong. Gojong surprised and ordered the troops to dissolve the congress.

== See also ==
- Independence Club
- Tongnip sinmun
- Independence Gate
- Philip Jaisohn
- Yun Chi-ho
- Ahn Chang-ho
- Syngman Rhee
- Kim Kyu-sik
- Lee Sang-jae
