= Constitution of Korea =

Constitution of Korea may refer to:

- Constitution of North Korea
- Constitution of South Korea
- Constitution of the Korean Empire – 1899 document
