= Seokjojeon =

Buildings in Seoul, South Korea

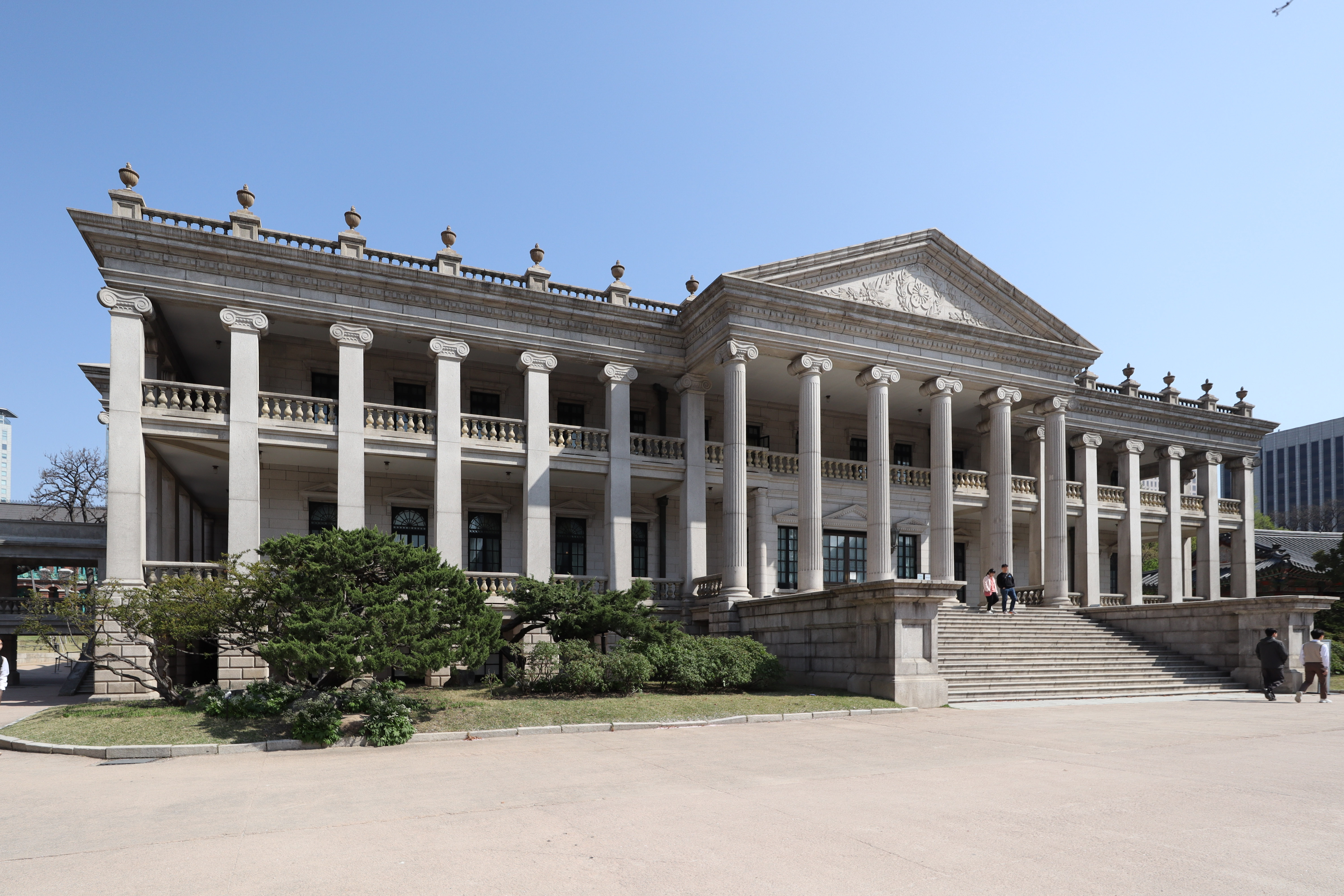
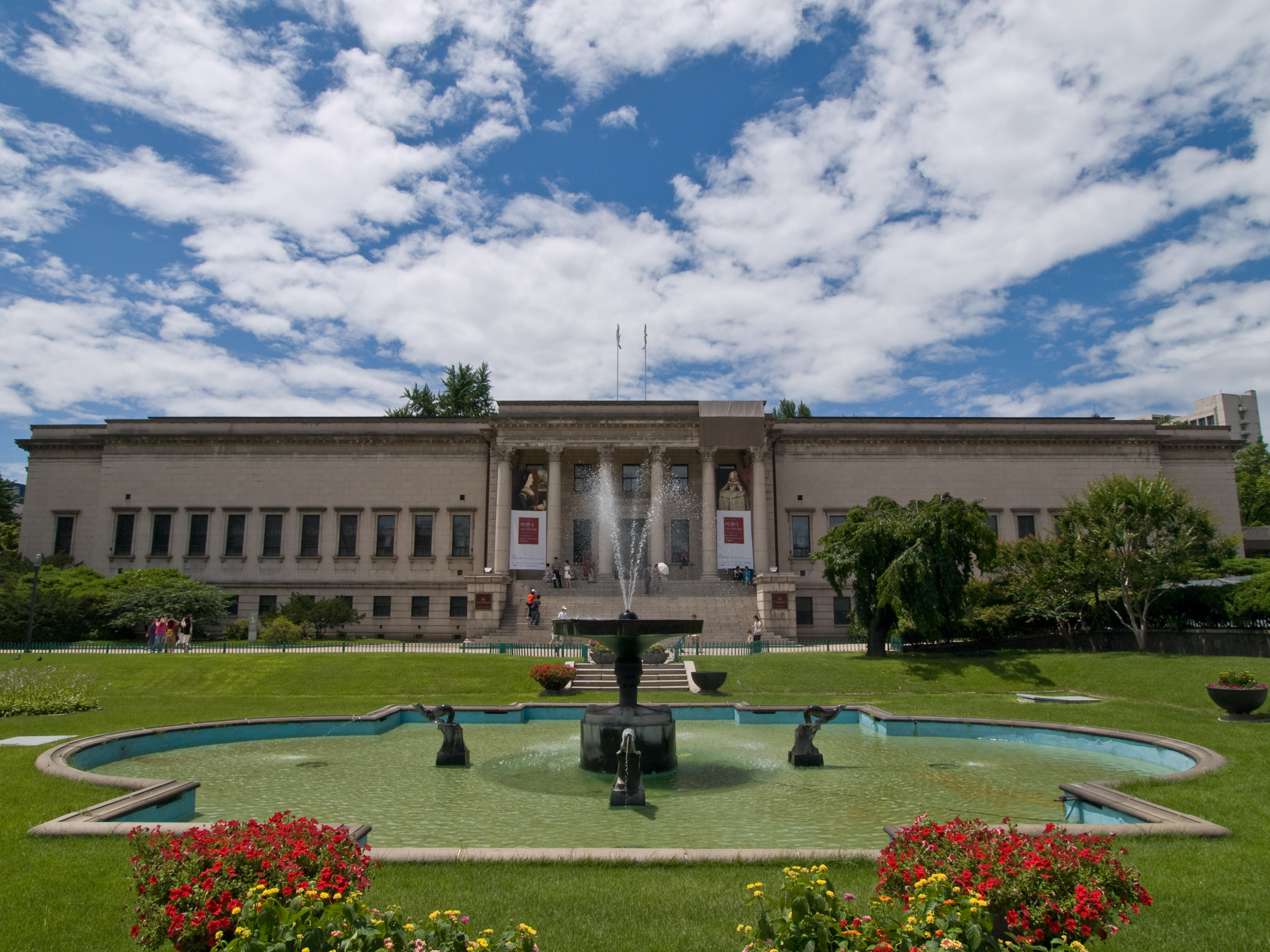
- Main building (top) and West Wing (bottom)
- Etymology: Hall made of stone

General information
- Location: Deoksugung, Seoul, South Korea
- Coordinates: 37.5664°N 126.9742°E
- Current tenants: Korean Empire History Museum
- Construction started: 1900
- Completed: April 1910
- Client: House of Yi

Technical details
- Floor count: 3 (2 above ground, 1 below)

Design and construction
- Architect: John Reginald Harding

Korean name
- Hangul: 석조전
- Hanja: 石造殿
- RR: Seokjojeon
- MR: Sŏkchojŏn

Seokjojeon (Korean: 석조전; Hanja: 石造殿; lit. 'Stone Hall') is a former imperial palace building of the Korean Empire located inside the palace Deoksugung in Seoul, South Korea. The main building is a Western-style neoclassical château made entirely of granite and bricks. It was completed in 1910 as a residence for the Korean royal family and now serves as the Daehan Empire History Museum. The building also has an adjacent West Wing that was completed in 1938 and now serves as the National Museum of Modern and Contemporary Art, Deoksugung branch.

The main building was originally meant to serve as a modern, Western seat of the Korean Empire. British people designed and furnished the building in Western style. Months after the building's completion, Korea was annexed by Japan. The Korean royal family continued to live in and use the building until the 1919 death of Gojong, the penultimate Korean monarch. Afterwards, it came to be used to entertain and house Japanese dignitaries. It was then made into the Seokjojeon Art Museum in 1933. Upon the completion of the West Wing building, both buildings were together considered the Yi Royal Family Art Museum.

After the 1945 liberation of Korea, the buildings served a number of purposes. The main building was heavily damaged during the 1950–1953 Korean War and then repaired. In 1998, the West Wing was made part of the National Museum of Modern and Contemporary Art. In the late 2000s, the main building began to be converted into the Daehan Empire History Museum, which opened in 2014.

== Description ==
=== Main building ===
The exterior of the building is neoclassical in style and has Ionic columns. It is made of granite and bricks, with stone pillars and steel beams for support. The foundation of the building is made of concrete and steel. The building was designed and constructed using imperial units. The interior of the building has significantly changed over time. It was renovated a number of times over the last century, and has had elements added or removed. It is unknown when some of the changes occurred.

As part of efforts to establish the Daehan Empire History Museum, historical materials were used to recreate as much of the interior as possible to match the original appearance of the building. Rooms for which there is no known surviving evidence have been turned into exhibits on the Korean Empire.

The interior is decorated in the Rococo style, which was popular in the 17th and 18th centuries. White and gold elements are used throughout the building. The original color scheme of much of the interior is reportedly unknown, as surviving photos are in black and white. In 2023, South Korean scholar Choi Ji-hye performed an analysis of the original interior decorator's other projects and determined that the main audience chamber was decorated with green curtains and carpet, in contrast to the current recreation's red.

All of the furniture was from Messrs Maple & Co. The company was popular with royal and luxury residences in a number of countries, including Thailand and Japan. Maple later described their work in the building as "a characteristically English interior". The building has a total of 41 original pieces of furniture that date to the Korean Empire period. Some of the furniture are reproductions or antiques that were purchased. A table in the central lobby is original and is considered the most luxurious original object in the palace. It was kept in the palace Changdeokgung until it was moved back to Seokjojeon. The building features Western-style heating elements and lighting made by the British Crittall & Company. It has a number of electrified chandeliers.

The main building has three floors: one below ground and two above. The building's main entrance on the second floor goes in to a central lobby (대광문; 大廣門), with an open ceiling to the third floor. Across the central lobby is the audience chamber (접견실; 接見室). That room's ceiling is in the Palladian style. The audience chamber had several columns that were removed in the 1930s at the latest, which later caused structural integrity issues. The ceiling is around a third lower than its original height due to support beams that were added after the Korean War. The room has large mirrors that were placed to reflect the lights and create a dazzling effect. It is decorated with plum blossoms, a symbol of the Korean Empire. The second floor originally had seven rooms (excluding the staircase rooms). The third floor originally had four rooms. One room was intended for use by Gojong; he never ended up using it and instead stayed in Hamnyeongjeon, elsewhere in Deoksugung. Instead, Yi Un used the room during his visits to Korea from Japan until 1922. The basement floor was used by servants. It is not known what the basement floor looked like; there are no surviving records on its appearance.

=== West Wing ===
The West Wing is also in a neoclassical style. Unlike the main building, it does not have a front gabled section; this is characteristic of neoclassical architecture in the 1930s. It does not have columns or verandas on its sides. It also does not have any windows on the second floor. The lack of windows is reportedly due to the building's role as an art museum; natural light is instead provided via skylights that shine from above, rather than horizontally at paintings. The main building has a central hall that is open to both the first and second floors. Exhibits branch out from the central hall.

== History ==
=== Background ===
The surrounding palace, Deoksugung, originally began as the residence of Grand Prince Wolsan and was only later made a palace in 1611 due to the surrounding palaces being burned down during the Imjin War. During much of the later Joseon dynasty, the palace was little used by the Korean royal family. After the 1895 assassination of the Korean Empress Myeongseong, the Korean monarch Gojong fled to the Russian Legation (which is near Deoksugung) in 1896 for safety. There, he experienced Western-style amenities (and Western cuisine from Antoinette Sontag). In 1897, Gojong proclaimed the Korean Empire and made Deoksugung his main palace. He then began work on significantly renovating the palace, Westernizing and modernizing its amenities.

=== Design and construction ===
The construction of Seokjojeon was proposed in 1893 by Sir John McLeavy Brown, the British advisor in Korea and an accountant. He surveyed the plot of land in March 1897. Brown provided initial construction funds of 3 million won. Seokjojeon was designed by a Shanghai-based Irish architect John Reginald Harding over a period of two years. The designs were completed in 1901 under the Japanese engineer Ogawa Youkichi (小川陽吉) and the Korean architect Sim Ŭisŏk. Sōga Ben (曽我 勉) constructed a 1/10 scale wooden model of the building.

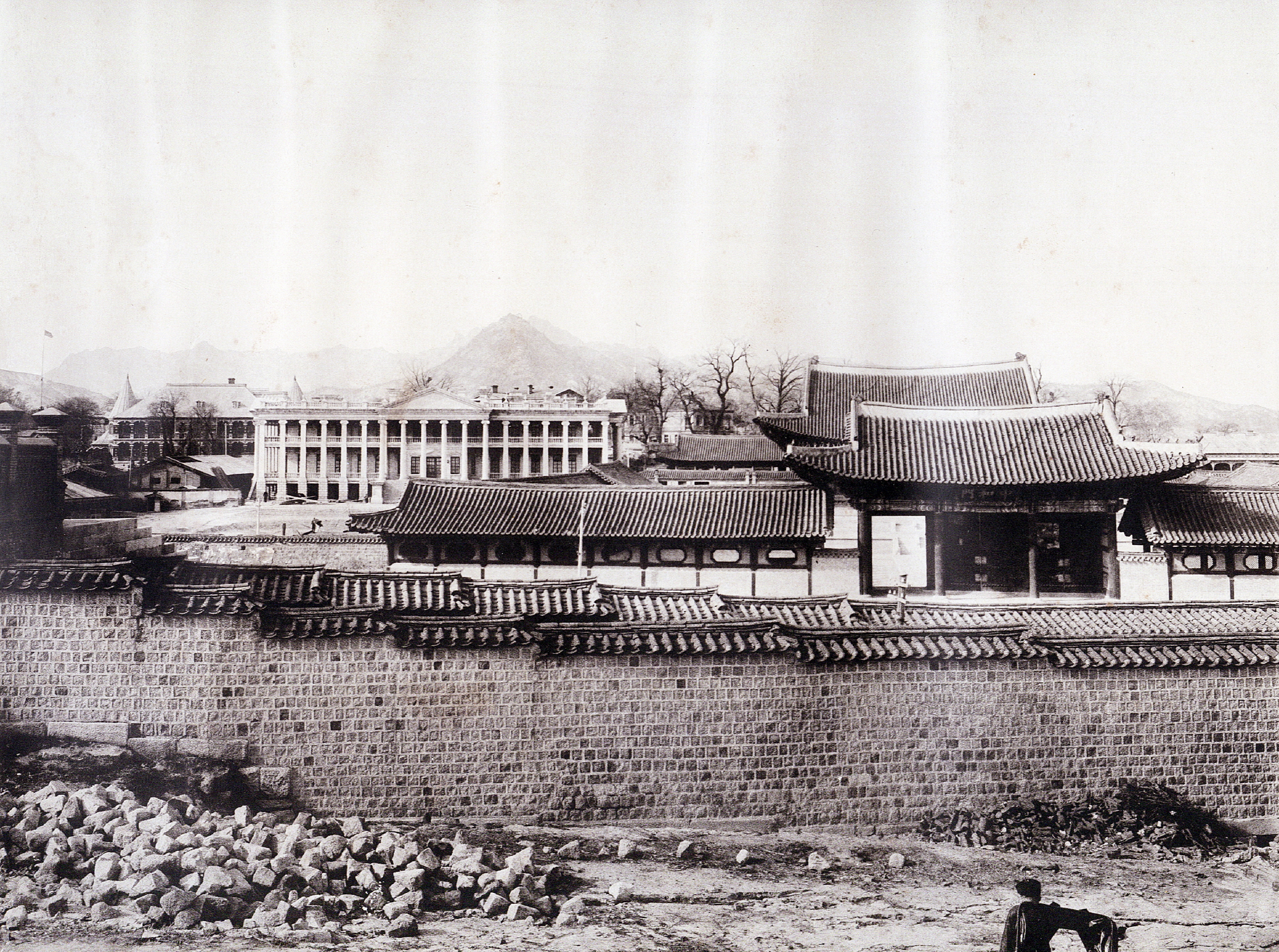
Deoksugung, viewed from outside the palace walls, in 1911. Seokjojeon is visible to the left.

Foundation construction began in 1900 and was completed in 1901. After a pause from August 1903 to November 1906 possibly caused by economic restrictions, the exterior and structure of the building was constructed by the Japanese company Ōkura Doboku Gumi. Harding was construction supervisor until 1905. Ishii Shūhei (石井周平) and Henry William Davidson served as construction supervisors. In summer 1907, Richard Goulburn Lovell began work on the interior of the building. Lovell worked on decorations from June 1909 to April 1910. At the request of Brown, Maple & Co. employees visited Korea in summer 1907 to plan the interior decorations. More visited in June 1909 and stayed until their work was completed in spring 1910. The building was probably completed around early April 1910. It cost a total of 1 million won, including 120,000 for decorations and 100,000 on the interior. All funding for the building was managed and provided by Brown, who was in charge of economic development projects in the Korean Empire that forwarded British-Korean relations.

After the completion of the building, work began on building the front garden. Davidson oversaw this task, which was eventually completed in March 1913 and cost 50,000 won. The garden included hundreds of trees donated by Yoshino Tazaemon (吉野太左衛門), the chief of the newspaper Keijō nippō, and a greenhouse with 1,200 bonzai trees. A pond with a turtle sculpture, symbolizing a wish for Gojong's long life, was installed.

=== Colonial period ===
Seokjojeon and other modern buildings Gojong had built in Deoksugung were meant to serve as symbols of the Korean Empire's authority. However, just months after the building's completion, Korea was formally annexed by Japan. For a time, the building continued to see significant usage by Gojong and the last Korean emperor Sunjong. After Gojong died in 1919, Deoksugung ceased to be used by the royal family. The building then became used as a hotel, theater, and banquet hall for Japanese dignitaries.

In spring 1933, the Office of the Yi Dynasty decided that the building for the Yi Royal Family Museum in Changgyeonggung was too small and wished to move their collection to Deoksugung. Work began to convert Seokjojeon to an art museum. The main hall and audience chamber were more or less kept in the same state; other rooms experienced varying degrees of modification. The Seokjojeon Art Museum opened on October 1. The second floor displayed Japanese and Western paintings, and the third crafts. There was reportedly resentment about the lack of Korean works of art being displayed in the museum. From August 21, 1936, to 1938, the three-story West Wing was constructed. This wing would hold the Office of the Yi Dynasty's collection. It was designed by the Japanese architect Nakamura Yoshihei (中村與志平). Together, these buildings became the Yi Royal Family Art Museum. Seokjojeon continued to display modern Japanese art, and was called the Modern Japanese Art Exhibition Hall (Japanese: 近代日本美術陳列館; Korean: 근대일본미술진열관). A writer for the Encyclopedia of Korean Culture evaluated the museum as being designed to juxtapose "old" Korean art with "modern" Japanese art in order to justify Japan's colonial rule.

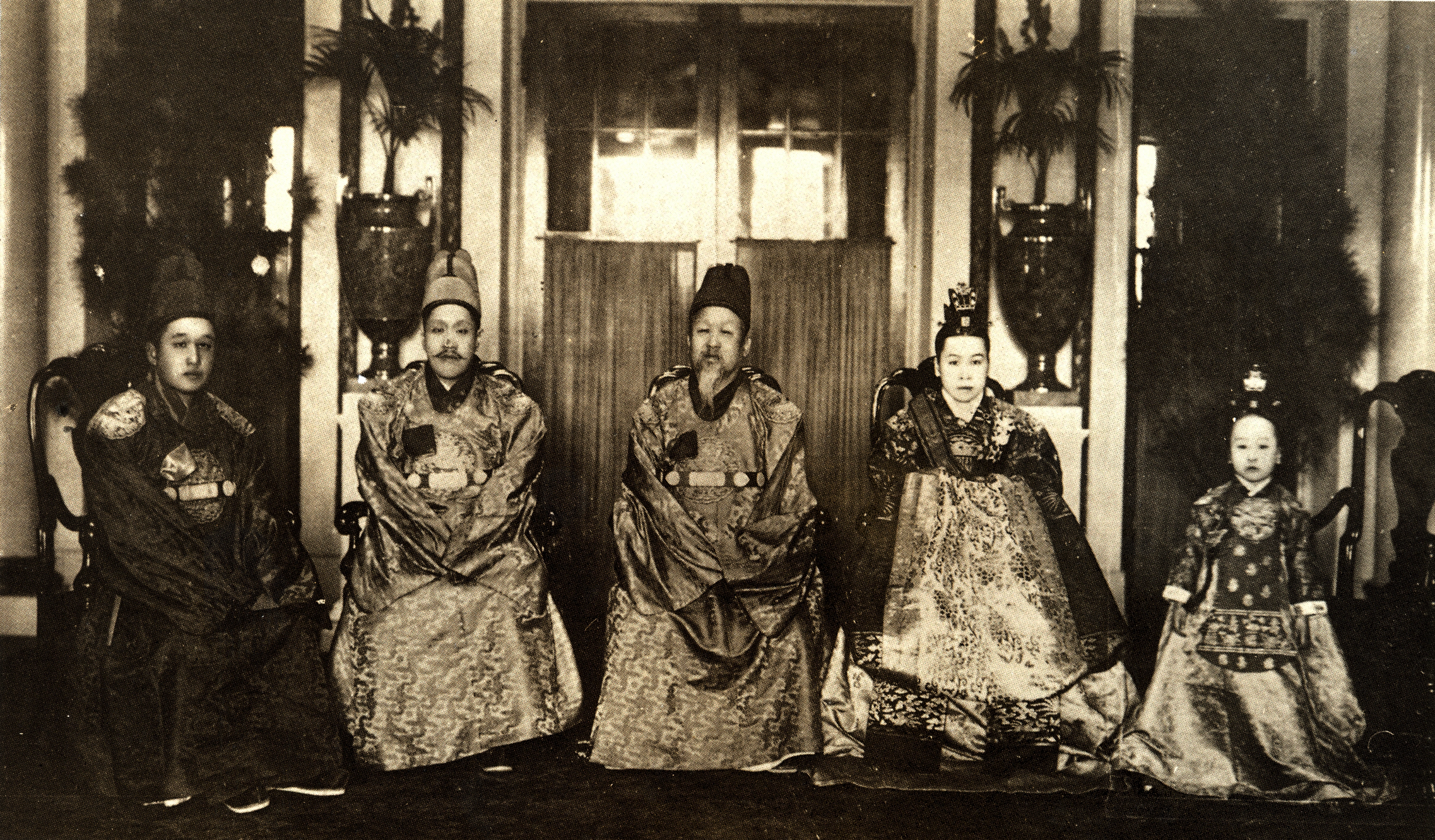
Gojong (center) and his family, photo taken in the central lobby of the main building (1918)

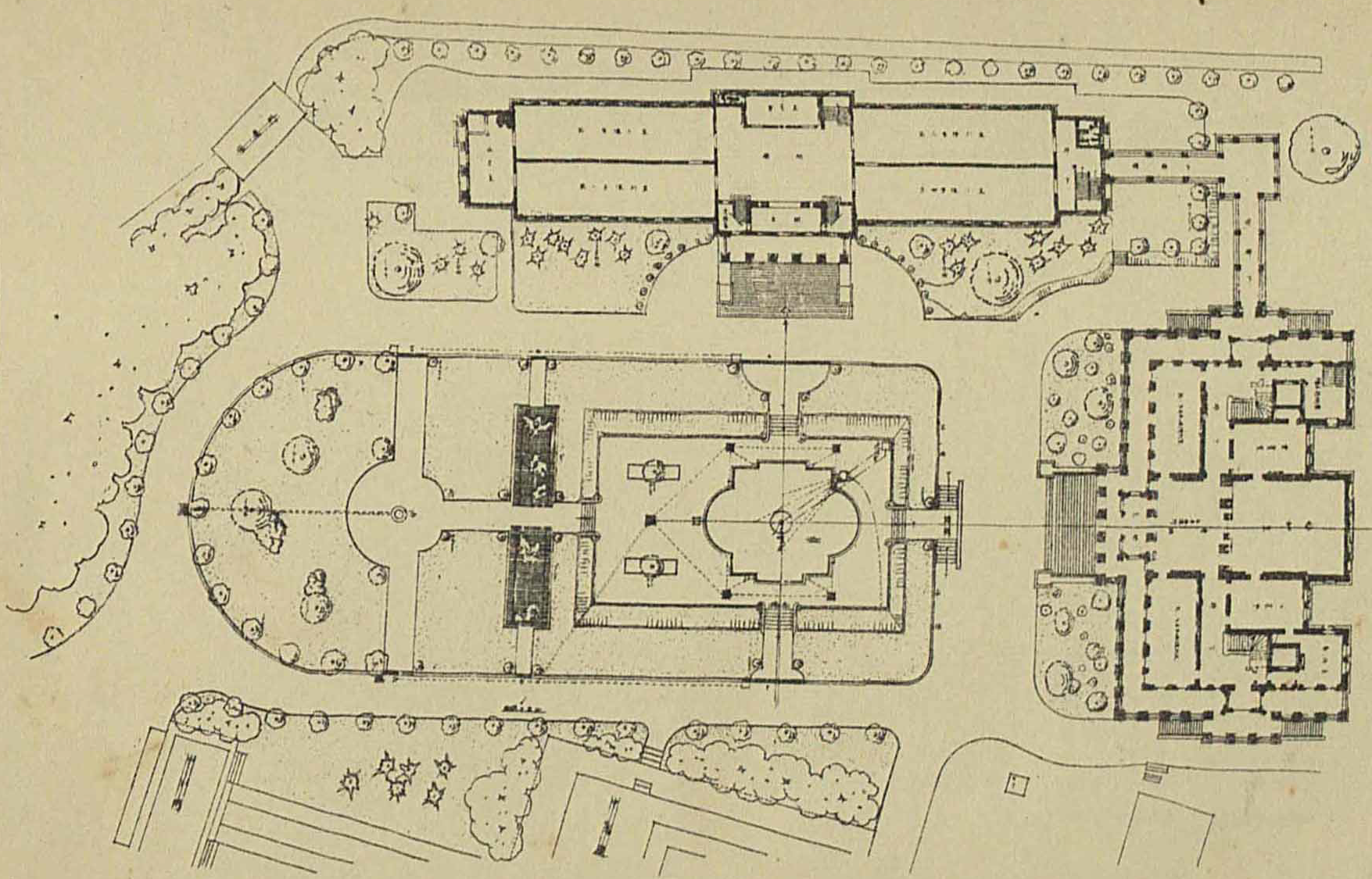
Plans for Seokjojeon. Main building to the right, West Wing on top, and fountain in center (1938)

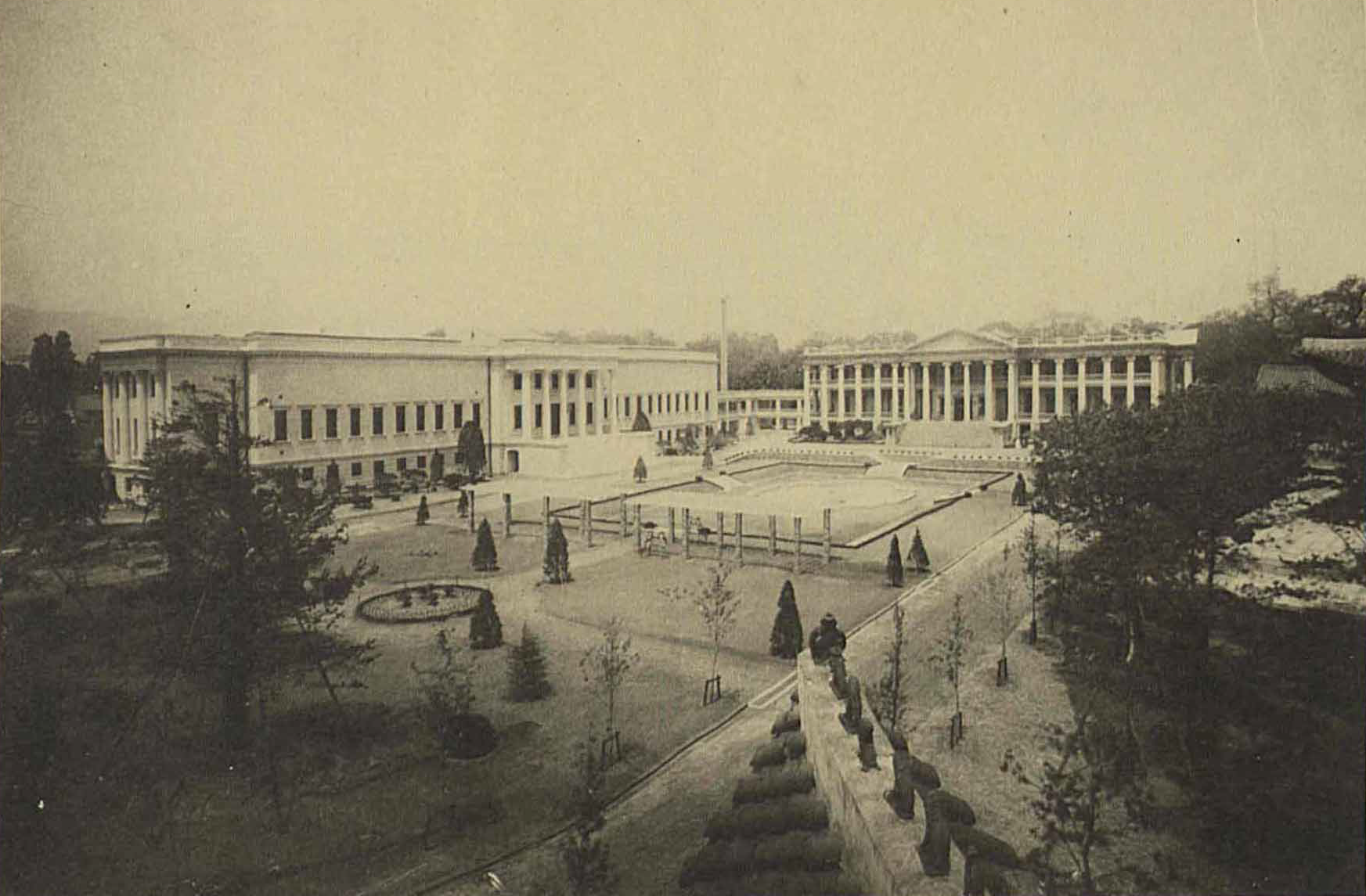
The Yi Royal Family Art Museum (1938)

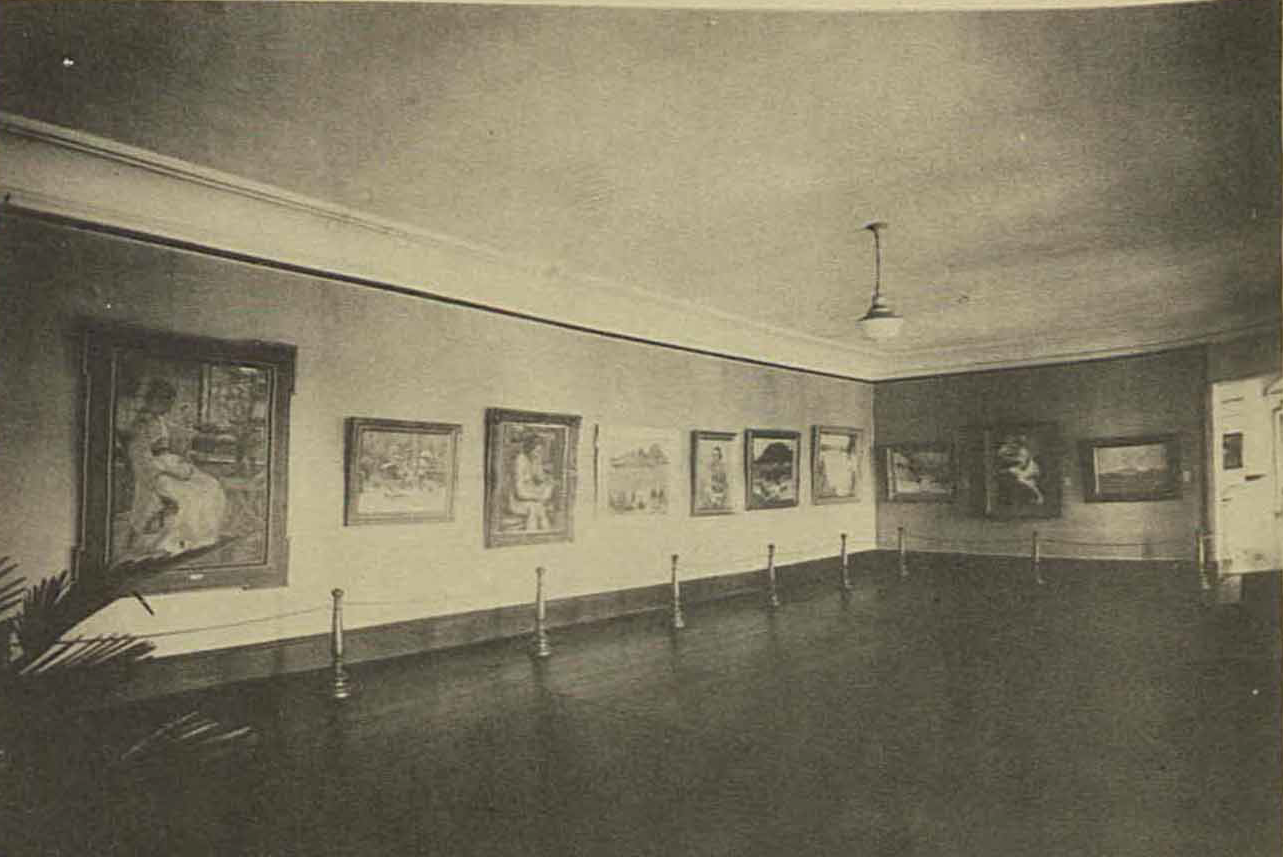
Art museum interior (1938)

=== Later history ===
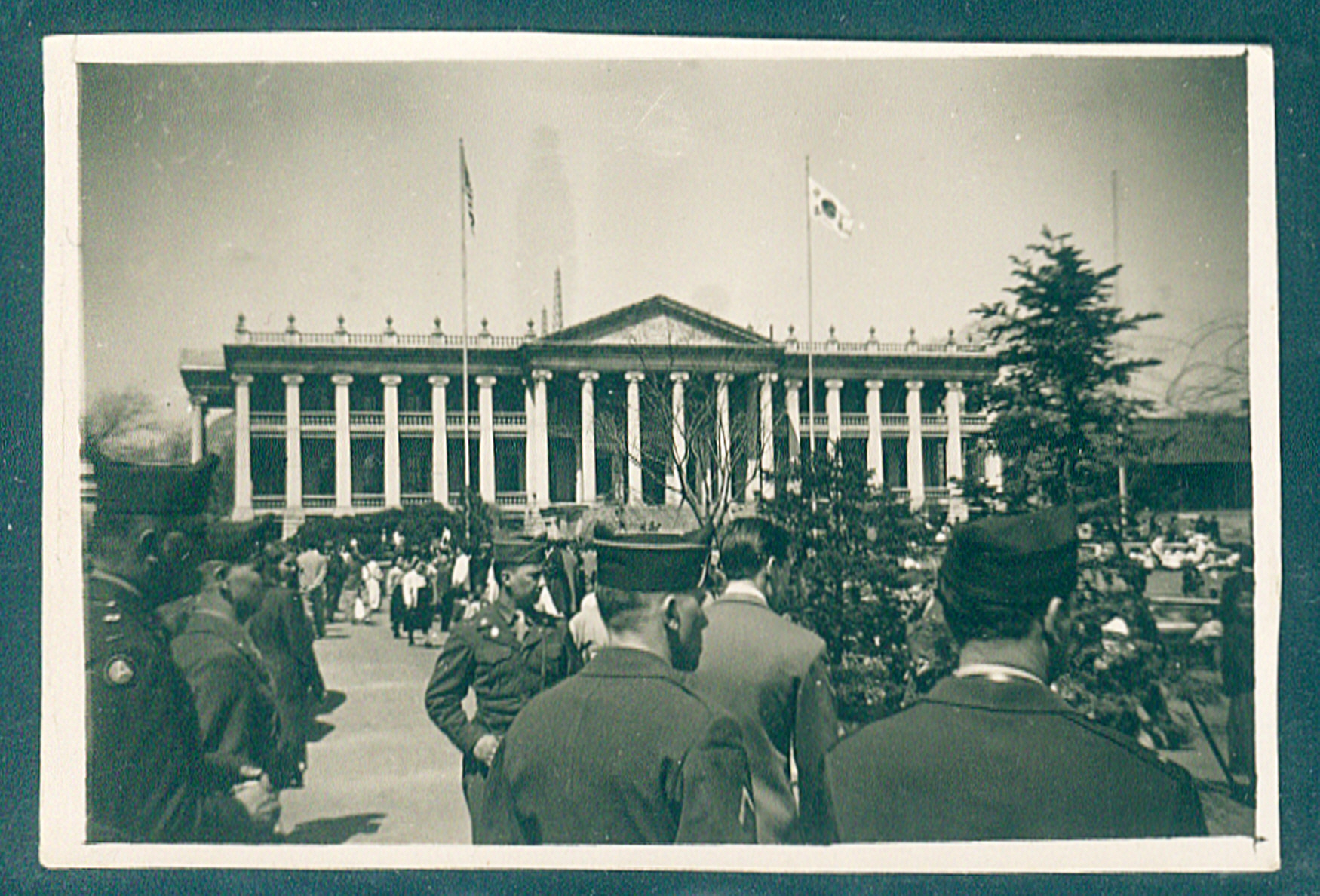
American soldiers at Seokjojeon (c. 1946 to 1948)

Soon after the 1945 liberation of Korea, the buildings were used for a variety of purposes. The art museum was renamed to the Deoksugung Art Museum and hosted an exhibit to honor the arrival of the United States Army Military Government in Korea. In March 1946, the U.S. designated Seokjojeon as the offices of the United States–Soviet Union Joint Commission. They held a major meeting in the building on the issue of Korean reunification on March 20, 1946. The returning Korean Provisional Government used the building for a number of its meetings. The joint commission was dissolved in October 1947.

In 1950, during the Korean War, the interior of the building was destroyed by fire. The building's original wooden roof trusses were severely damaged and were replaced with steel trusses. An October 30, 1950 article in Seoul Shinmun estimated the damages to the buildings as 8 million won. Restoration work on the buildings began in 1955 by the Army Corps of Engineers (육군 공병단). Afterwards, the buildings began to be used as museums again. The Yi Royal Family Art Museum was made the Deoksugung Art Museum and was managed by the South Korean government (under a predecessor to the Korea Heritage Service) without much involvement from the Jeonju Lee Royal Family Association (the successor organization to the Office of the Yi Dynasty). In 1969, the museum was incorporated into the national museum system. The buildings were used as part of the National Museum of Modern and Contemporary Art from July 1973 until 1986. The West Wing was then occupied by the National Institute of Korean Language until 1998.

In 1987, significant renovation work on the main Seokjojeon building began. The project was designed by Geumseong Construction (금성종합건축) and construction was performed by Hyundai Engineering & Construction. The floorplan of the building was altered, with several walls being removed or added. The building's support structure was modernized and reinforced.

Beginning in 2003, inspections revealed that the main Seokjojeon building had a number of safety issues. Cracks were found in the building, and it was determined that the roof was too heavy for the building's structure, and that the building had been suffering from weather conditions. Investigation work concluded in 2005, and repair work began in December 2006. Work was completed in August 2007.

=== Renovations and repurposings ===
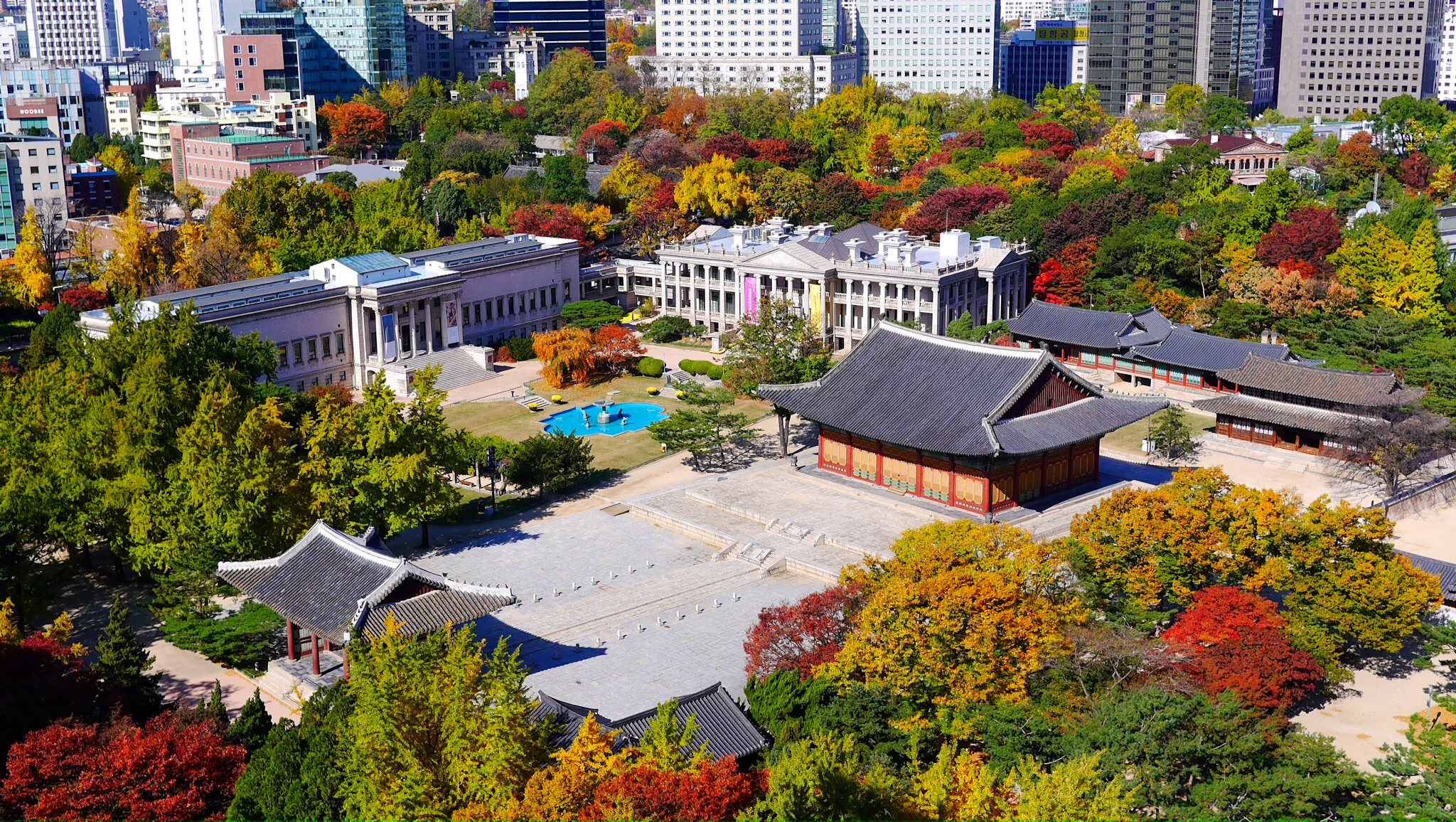
Overview of the buildings (2014)

In 1998, the West Wing was made into a branch of the National Museum of Modern and Contemporary Art. Beginning in 2009, the main building began to be converted into a history museum that covers the Korean Empire period. The project cost US$13.2 million. Both the structure and the interior of the building were renovated to resemble its original form as closely as possible. Furniture and other authentic items were acquired. The use of tax funds to recreate a foreign-looking building from a perceived dark period in Korean history received some criticism.

The museum opened on October 13, 2014. In 2020, amidst the building's closure due to the COVID-19 pandemic, the Cultural Heritage Administration began offering virtual tours of Seokjojeon. Various events and concerts have since been held in the building, including classical musical performances. Night at Seokjojeon is a biannual annual event held in the spring and fall at the building. Visitors purchase tickets in advance and receive refreshments, listen to live music, and see a performance at the building.
