= New People's Association =

1906–1911 Korean independence organization

- Hangul: 신민회
- Hanja: 新民會
- RR: Sinminhoe
- MR: Sinminhoe

The New People's Association (Korean: 신민회; Hanja: 新民會) was a Korean independence activist organization established in April 1906 in the Korean Empire. The organization was formed by social activists such as Ahn Changho, Sin Chaeho, Park Eun-sik, and Lim Chi-jung.

With their belief that the Enlightenment could strengthen the national power of Korea to achieve independence, they took action on military movement, education, publication, and industrialization. Even after the New People's Association had been dissolved by the Governor-General of Korea in 1911, they made a considerable contribution to the Korean Independence Movement.

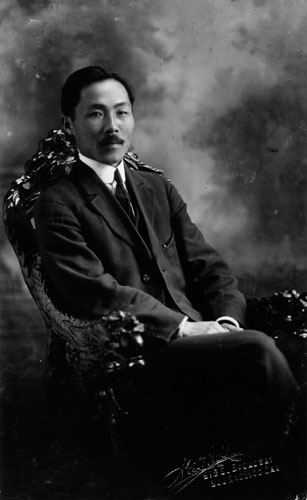
Ahn Chang-ho

== Background ==
After the Independence Club (독립협회, 獨立協會) was dissolved on December 25, 1898, as Emperor Gojong officially announced a prohibition on congresses held by people, the Empire of Japan made a treaty with the Korean Empire called the Eulsa Treaty which made the Korean Empire become a protectorate of the Empire of Japan. The treaty laid the foundation for the Japan-Korea Annexation Treaty of 1907 and the subsequent annexation of Korea in 1910. Even though Emperor Sunjong, a son of Emperor Gojong, sent a Hague Secret Emissary Affair to expose the unfairness of the treaty in the Hague Convention of 1907, they were ignored by the Great Powers.

== History ==
From the initiation by Ahn Changho in Los Angeles, California, the people who used to be the leaders of the Independence Club decided to organize the Korean New People's Association (대한신민회) from Pyeongyang and Seoul in late 1906. After the establishment, they established branches nationwide and started to support education, industrialization, and military actions for independence. However, in 1911, the New People's Association was dissolved. Even though they were dismissed, their ideology and main actions were later inherited by the Provisional Government of the Republic of Korea.

== Ideology ==
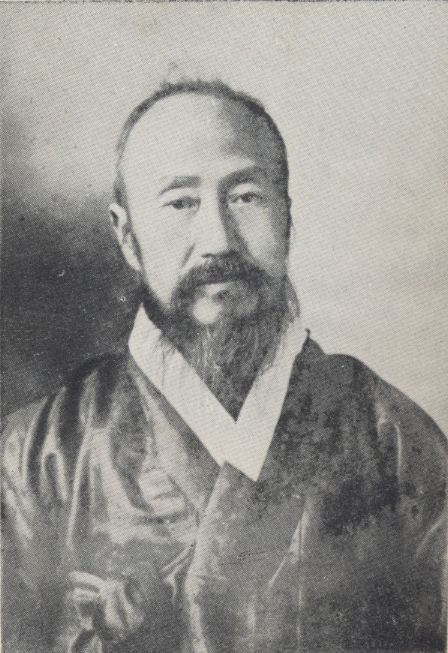
Yun Chi-ho

The main political ideology of the New People's Association was based on ideals of democracy and republicanism, which is far different from the constitutional monarchy the Independence Club espoused. Also, to strengthen national power, they asserted that citizens should be reformed to become new people (신민, 新民) first. In other words, they believed people should be 'prepared' first for the opportunity of Korean independence.

== Actions ==
=== Military School of the New Rising ===
The New People's Association supported the Righteous Army movement (militias in Korea) to restore the nation's power. They established the Military School of the New Rising, which made a considerable contribution to the foundation of the Korean Liberation Army (한국 광복군), Korean Independence Army (대한독립군), Korean Revolutionary Army (조선혁명군), and Heroic Corps (의열단) from 1911 to 1920.

=== Education ===
As they believed that the Enlightenment was one of the most crucial factors in strengthening national power, the New People's Association also made a massive investment in education in Korea. It is assumed that the New People's Association established hundreds of middle schools.

=== Publication ===
The New People's Association also published The Korea Daily News. At the same time, Sonyeon (Boys, 소년) was published as a monthly magazine for students, and all these publication activities provided a basis for Korea's modern culture.

== Leaders of Sinminhoe ==
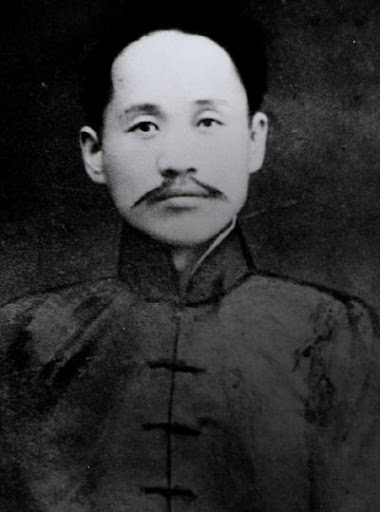
Shin Chaeho

- Shin Chaeho (신채호, 申采浩)
- Ahn Changho (안창호, 安昌浩)
- Yun Chiho (윤치호, 尹致昊)
- Park Eunsik (박은식, 朴殷植)
- Yi Dongnyeong (이동녕, 李東寧)
- Yang Gitak (양기탁, 梁起鐸)
- Jang Jiyeon (장지연, 張志淵)
- Yi Donghwi (이동휘, 李東煇)
- Lim Chi Jung (임치정, 林蚩正)
