= Constitution of the Korean Empire =

1899 document

The Constitution of the Korean Empire (Korean: 대한국 국제; Hanja: 大韓國國制; MR: Taehan'guk kukche; lit. 'National Constitution of the Korean Empire') was proclaimed on August 14, 1899 (Gwangmu 3) in the Korean Empire under the authority of the Emperor of Korea, Gojong. Some historians regard it as Korea's first modern constitution. It was materialized as a demand for modernization as a part of the Kwangmu Reform. Although it outwardly adopted the form of a constitutional monarchy, the document in practice enshrined the emperor's absolute authority, omitting any provisions guaranteeing the rights of the people.

The constitution was drafted by Yun Yongsŏn (尹容善), President of the Law Codification Office (法規校正所, Pŏpkyu Kyojŏngso), together with legislative officials Sŏ Chŏngsun (徐正淳), Yi Chaesun (李載純), and foreign advisers Charles Le Gendre (李善得, Yi Sŏndŏk), John McLeavy Brown (柏卓安, Paek T'agan), and Clarence Ridgley Greathouse (具禮, Ku Rye).

The draft consisted of nine articles and received imperial approval in 1899. It was promulgated on August 17, 1899, by imperial decree (choch'ŏk, 詔勅) and pongji (奉旨, “by imperial order”).

The constitution remained in force until the Japan–Korea Treaty of 1907, which significantly curtailed Korean sovereignty, and was effectively nullified with the Japan–Korea Annexation Treaty of 1910.

== Content ==
Formally, the constitution appeared to adopt the framework of a constitutional monarchy. However, its actual effect was to legitimize absolute monarchy under the guise of modern constitutional form. The name kukche (국제), itself implies that it was a constitutional document expressing absolute monarchy. The emperor was granted unlimited and inviolable sovereignty, encompassing legislative, executive, judicial, diplomatic, and military powers. It does not mention the existence or role of the state-level legislature, Chungch'uwŏn.

=== English translation of the Constitution of the Korean Empire ===
Article 1 – The Korean Empire is an independent and autonomous empire recognized by all nations of the world.

Article 2 – The politics of the Korean Empire follow the traditions of the past five hundred years, and shall hereafter remain unchanged for all eternity as an absolute monarchy.

Article 3 – The Emperor of Korea enjoys unlimited sovereign authority, a self-standing form of government recognized by public law.

Article 4 – Any subject of the Korean Empire who commits an act that infringes upon the sovereign authority of the emperor shall, regardless of whether the act is completed or attempted, be regarded as having abandoned the duties of a subject.

Article 5 – The Emperor commands the army and navy of the empire, determines their organization, and may declare or lift martial law.

Article 6 – The Emperor enacts laws, orders their promulgation and enforcement, revises domestic laws in reference to universally accepted international laws, and grants general amnesties, special pardons, commutations, and restorations of rights.

Article 7 – The Emperor establishes or revises the organization of government ministries and the salaries of civil and military officials, and issues necessary imperial ordinances for administration.

Article 8 – The Emperor appoints, promotes, demotes, and dismisses civil and military officials, and confers or revokes titles, decorations, and other honors.

Article 9 – The Emperor dispatches envoys to treaty nations, accredits them, and concludes declarations of war, peace treaties, and various agreements.
