= Tongnip sinmun =

1896–1899 Korean newspaper

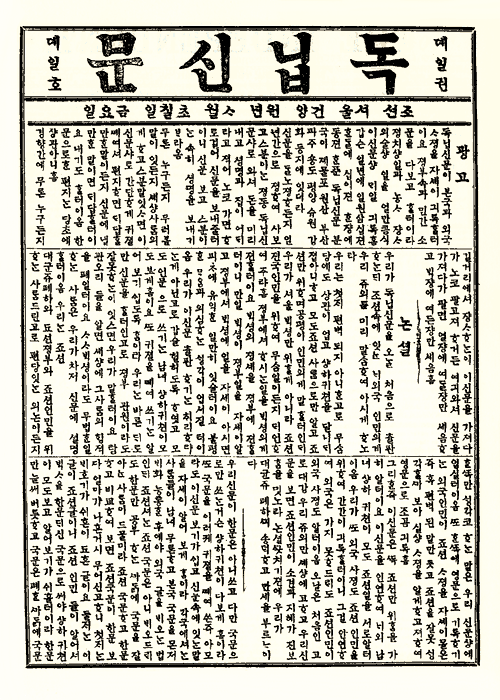
- April 7, 1897 edition
- Founder: Philip Jaisohn
- Founded: April 1896
- Ceased publication: December 4, 1899
- Political alignment: Liberalism
- Language: Korean (Hangul), English
- Circulation: 2,000–3,000

- Tongnip sinmun
- Hangul: 독립신문
- Hanja: 獨立新聞
- RR: Dongnip sinmun
- MR: Tongnip sinmun

Tongnip Sinmun (Korean: 독립신문; Hanja: 獨立新聞), also known by its translated title The Independent, was a historic newspaper published in Korean and English between 1896 and 1899. It was the first privately managed daily newspaper in Korea and the first to print editions written exclusively in Hangul, rather than being interspersed with Hanja, as was the common practice.

The newspaper was founded in July 1896 by the Korean intellectual Seo Jae-pil (later known as Philip Jaisohn).

Both language editions were initially published every other day, but the Korean edition later became a daily publication, while the English edition appeared weekly. The newspaper's average circulation per issue has been estimated at between 2,000 and 3,000 copies.

Tongnip Sinmun is registered as a National Registered Cultural Heritage of South Korea.

== Background ==
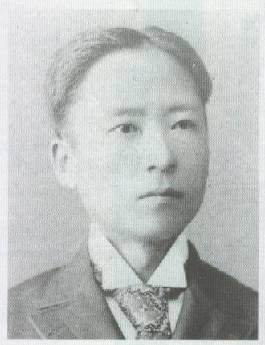
Seo Jae-pil (Philip Jaisohn) as a young man

After participating in the failed Gapsin Coup of 1884, which aimed to reform the Joseon bureaucracy, Seo Jae-pil sought refuge in the United States. While in exile, he learned from Pak Yŏnghyo that he had been pardoned of the charge of high treason in March 1895, and that his Gaehwapa (개화파, lit. "reformist") associates had come to power during his absence. As a result, he decided to return to Korea in December of that year.

Upon his return, Prime Minister Kim Hong-jip persuaded Seo to join the cabinet as Oemu hyeoppan (외무협판), a position roughly equivalent to the modern Minister of Foreign Affairs. Seo declined the offer, arguing that grassroots enlightenment was a more urgent priority than participation in the national cabinet. He viewed the lack of public support as a major factor in the failure of the Gapsin Coup and believed that the success of the Gabo Reform (1894) depended on gaining the backing of the general populace. To achieve this, he considered the establishment of a progressive newspaper to be essential as a means of public education.

In January 1896, Seo Jae-pil and Yu Gil-chun agreed to establish a non-governmental newspaper company and to publish Korean and English editions beginning March 1 of that year. The Kim Hong-jip cabinet strongly supported the plan, promising Seo a government subsidy of 300 won per month and appointing him as an adviser to the Jungchuwon (중추원; 中樞院), or Privy Council.

Although the collapse of the Kim Hong-jip cabinet resulted in the loss of support from several key figures, including Yu Gil-chun, Seo later received renewed approval for the project from the succeeding Pak Jung-yang cabinet. The Pak cabinet allocated 3,000 won for the newspaper's establishment and an additional 1,400 won for Seo's living expenses. Seo purchased printing equipment and type from Japan, rented a government-owned building in the Jung-dong district of Seoul, established the Tongnip Sinmun company, and published its first issue in April 1896. The newspaper was thus the product of cooperation between Seo Jae-pil and the government under both the Kim and Pak cabinets.

Seo Jae-pil served as the chief editor of the newly founded paper. Ju Si-gyeong worked as assistant editor for both the Korean and English editions. At the time of publication, the newspaper was produced in tabloid format (8.6 × 12.9 inches) and issued three times a week—on Tuesdays, Thursdays, and Saturdays—comprising four pages in total. The first three pages were printed in Korean, and the final page, titled "The Independent," was in English. Unlike existing government bulletins, Tongnip Sinmun included a wide range of content, such as editorials, local news, official announcements, summaries of domestic and international events, and miscellaneous information, including advertisements.

== Development and discontinuance ==
Front page of the English edition of The Independent (1896)

The Tongnip Sinmun underwent four distinct phases from its inception to its eventual discontinuance. The first phase extended from April 7 to July 2, 1896, the period between the newspaper's first issue and the establishment of the Tongnip Hyeophoe (lit. "Independence Club"). During this time, the paper primarily focused on national enlightenment. It maintained a cooperative stance toward the government and sought to inform readers about government policies. Its articles were politically moderate in tone, even as the publication began to influence public awareness and thought.

The second phase lasted from July 4, 1896, to May 11, 1898, covering the period between the founding of the Tongnip Hyeophoe and the transfer of the newspaper to Yun Ch'iho. During this time, the Tongnip Sinmun supported projects led by the Independence Club, including the construction of the Independence Gate, Tongnip Park, and the Tongnipgwan (Independence Hall), while continuing to promote grassroots enlightenment. The newspaper's format also changed: the English edition began to be published separately, and its content was expanded twofold.

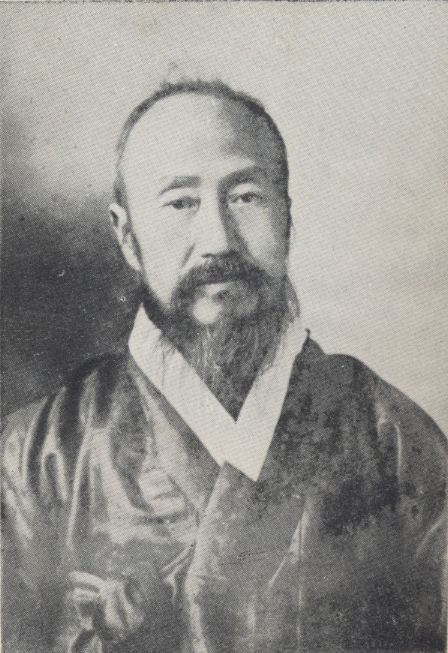
Yun Ch'iho

The paper established branch offices in Jemulpo and Shanghai and stationed correspondents there. Amid rising tensions between reformists and conservatives within the Korean cabinet, the Tongnip Hyeophoe came under increasing suppression by pro-Russian conservatives. In August 1897, the Russian government dispatched a military instructor and a financial adviser to Korea in a move widely viewed as interventionist. In response, the Tongnip Sinmun began publishing criticisms of the government, exposing corruption and denouncing foreign interference.

In December 1897, the newspaper faced the threat of closure due to its criticism of pro-Russian officials. Foreign diplomats also pressured King Gojong to impose censorship on the publication after it printed confidential documents revealing Russian and Japanese efforts to secure concessions from the Korean government. Some members of the foreign community feared that a politically active press might hinder "concession diplomacy" by mobilising public opposition to foreign privileges. Ultimately, the government expelled Seo Jae-pil from Korea and allowed the paper to continue under Yun Ch'iho's direction. Although Gojong drafted laws concerning press censorship, none was ever promulgated.

The third phase began when Yun Ch'iho assumed the role of chief editor and lasted until the dissolution of the Tongnip Hyeophoe in December 1898. During this period, the Tongnip Sinmun served as a mouthpiece for the increasingly embattled Independence Club while continuing to promote public education. From July 1898, the paper began daily publication in Korean, though the English edition did not appear daily.

The fourth and final phase began after the dissolution of the Tongnip Hyeophoe and continued until the paper's discontinuance. Following the breakup of the club, Yun Ch'iho—then both the paper's chief editor and president of the Tongnip Hyeophoe—was appointed to an official government post and left Seoul. As a result, leadership changes followed: missionary H.G. Appenzeller briefly assumed the position of chief editor, succeeded by H. Emberly in June 1899. Although the newspaper sought to maintain its founding principles, it moderated its criticism of the government and placed greater emphasis on education and public enlightenment.

Despite these efforts, the newspaper's tone softened, and government pressure increased. Authorities conducted searches of its offices and arrested journalists for reporting on official corruption. In July 1899, the government demanded the return of the newspaper's office building, further undermining its operations, which were already burdened by debt. In response, U.S. minister to Korea Horace Newton Allen mediated between the government and Seo Jae-pil, who still played an informal leadership role. On December 24, 1899, Seo agreed to sell the newspaper to the government for 4,000 won. The Tongnip Sinmun published its final issue on December 4, 1899, after which it was permanently discontinued.

== See also ==
- List of newspapers in South Korea
- List of newspapers in North Korea
