= Yun Ch'iho =

Korean politician (1864–1945)

- Yun with his family c. 1910. Yun Ch'iho is standing at the rear. His father, Yun Ung-nyeol is seated, wearing the western uniform of the Korean Empire.

Member of the House of Peers
- In office 3 April 1945 – 6 December 1945 Nominated by the Emperor

Personal details
- Born: 23 January 1864 Asan, Chungcheong, Joseon
- Died: 6 December 1945 (aged 80) Kaesong, Keiki, USAMGIK
- Parent: Yun Ungnyŏl (father)
- Education: Vanderbilt University; Emory University

Korean name
- Hangul: 윤치호
- Hanja: 尹致昊
- RR: Yun Chiho
- MR: Yun Ch'iho

Art name
- Hangul: 좌옹
- Hanja: 佐翁
- RR: Jwaong
- MR: Chwaong

Courtesy name
- Hangul: 성흠
- Hanja: 聖欽; 成欽
- RR: Seongheum
- MR: Sŏnghŭm

Yun Ch'iho (Korean: 윤치호; 23 January 1865 – 6 December 1945) was a Korean politician. His name is sometimes spelled Yun Tchi-Ho, his art name was Chwaong (좌옹), and his courtesy name was Sŏnghŭm (성흠).

Yun was born a member of a prominent aristocratic (yangban) family. He was the son of General Yun Ung-nyeol, who served as a minister in the Joseon government. Yun's connections earned him the rare opportunity to study abroad, and he did so in China, Japan and the United States. In the United States, he attended both Vanderbilt University and Emory University.

Yun was a prominent politician during the late Joseon and Korean Empire periods. He was a member of a number of reformist organizations, including the Independence Club, the People's Joint Association, and the New People's Association. He was a strong nationalist especially in his early years. He served in various government positions. He was also an ardent Methodist Christian, and an early leader of the Korean YMCA.

Although Yun was widely considered a nationalist for much of his early career, as Japan tightened its grip over Korea and eventually colonized it in 1910, Yun began to support the cause of the Japanese. He notably did not support many of the actions of the Korean independence movement, such as the March First Movement. As such, many recent Koreans remember him as a collaborator ("chinilpa").

== Early life ==
Yun Ch'iho was born on 26 December 1864, in a small village in Dunpo-myeon, Asan, Chungcheong Province. His father, Yun Ung-nyeol, was an official in the Joseon government and as a member of the yangban aristocracy saw that Ch'iho received a proper education. Yun Ch'iho excelled in his studies of the Confucian classics at the local seodang and even tried to apply to take the civil-service exams (gwageo) at age twelve.

From 1871 to 1878, Yun studied Confucianism at Chang's private village school.

=== Trip to Japan ===
Because of Yun Ung-yeol's position in the government, he was able to arrange for Yun Ch'iho's participation in a delegation of representatives from Korea to observe the process of modernization in Japan in 1881. Yun was only sixteen years old at the time, but this experience greatly influenced his thoughts on modernization and opened his eyes to world beyond the isolated "Hermit Kingdom" that Korea had become. He frequently compared the lack of progress in Joseon Korea to the rapid modernization of Japan and often lamented in his diaries that he wanted nothing more than for Korea to become the kind of advanced, modern nation that Japan had become.

=== Studying in China ===
Yun would later travel to Shanghai, China in 1885 where he would attend the Anglo-Chinese College studying English and mathematics, among other things. While in Shanghai he also converted to Christianity, something that would play a major role throughout the rest of his life. Yun Ch'iho viewed Christianity as a strong progressive philosophy that could help Korea catch up with the advancements of Japan and the West.

=== Time in America ===
He eventually even studied in America, starting in 1888 at Vanderbilt University and then Emory University. He strongly admired many aspects of American culture, but was also frustrated with the racial prejudices he experienced while living in the South. In particular, he would identify tensions and contradictions between Christian universalism, and the belief that any individual could earn respect and equality as long as they were pious, and the arbitrary demonstrations of white supremacy that he routinely witnessed and experienced. One such instance was his election to a month-long term as President of the Few Society at Emory, an honorary position. Yun tried to deny accepting this position, in part because of the dissatisfaction of his election by several classmates due to their white supremacist beliefs. While in America he studied English, theology and speech and he gained a great deal of proficiency in the English language; writing most of his diaries in English.

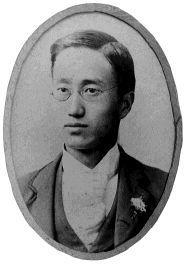
Yun Ch'iho as a student at Emory University (1892).

== Roles in government ==
=== Interpreter ===
Yun served in several important government positions throughout his life. He served as an interpreter for the first American Foreign Minister in Korea, Lucius Foote. Upon arriving in Korea Foote had inquired to the Japanese Foreign Minister Inoue Kaoru about finding someone to interpret for him while in Seoul, and Minister Inoue, who knew Yun Ch'iho from his days in Japan, recommended Yun to help serve Minister Foote. It was also Foote who helped Yun with arranging his studies in Shanghai.

=== Travel to Russia ===
Yun traveled to Russian Empire to participate in coronation of Nicholas II with some government officials including Min Young-hwan. They fled to Europe from the fort of Incheon.

=== Vice President of the Privy Council and banishment ===
Yun also served as the Vice President of the Privy Council of the Joseon Court from 1898 until he was banished in 1899 due to pressure from opposing factions in the government. While banished to the countryside, Yun served as magistrate for a town called Wonsan in Northern Korea. His banishment was not long lived and in 1903 he was called to serve as the Vice Foreign Minister.

== Reform organizations ==
=== The Independence Club ===
When Yun arrived back in Korea from his studies abroad, there were small groups of scholars who were beginning to call for social and political reform in Korea. One such group was the Independence club, which Yun began to participate in. Among other things, the club promoted educating the Korean people on their unique history, promoted the use of Hangeul, the Korean vernacular alphabet, and pushed for government reform. While in the Independence Club Yun called for the government to be more representative of its people and even supported the elevation of King Kojong to the title of Gwangmu Emperor. Eventually the group was met with pressure from opposing factions in the government that believed the club was gaining too much influence and so in 1899, the club disbanded.

=== The Enlightenment Movement ===
As Japanese influence on the Korean peninsula began to tighten, Yun also began to support groups that were part of the Enlightenment movement. These groups, such as the Korean Self-Strengthening Society and the New People's Society, were picking up the pieces where the independence club had left off, and Yun Ch'iho helped them out by giving speeches and writing pamphlets for them. During his time of Banishment, these groups gave Yun something to work for in the hopes of creating a stronger Korean society.

Yun signed the Japan–Korea Agreement as an acting Minister of Foreign Affair since Yi Ha-young was out of office that day. Yun was against the signing of Eulsa Treaty, which made Korea as a protectorate of Japan. He said to Durham Stevens who was in Korea that those who sign the treaty will be hated by Koreans like Benedict Arnold as a traitor. However when the treaty was actually signed, Yun was surprised. What baffled him the more was that Pak Chesoon signed the treaty. He praised Han Kyu-seol, who was the only one against the signing of treaty until the end. When Min Young-hwan committed suicide, Yun paid respects to his courage.

=== Japanese colonial period ===
From his early years, he was disappointed in the Joseon people for always having an emotional response and frustrated in their irrationality. In January 1910, he participated in the World Missionary Conference in America and that May, he attended the Edinburgh World Missionary Conference in England. In December 1910, he returned to his country.

When the Korean Empire was overrun by Japanese military forces in 1910 (see Japan-Korea Treaty of 1910), Yun Ch'iho joined with others in resisting Japanese occupation. He became an anti-Imperialist speaker and independence activist. In 1911, he was Judgment for alleged assassination of the Governor General of Korea. He suffered from malicious punishment and torture as a result of the 105-Man Incident.

In 1913, along with 104 others, he was charged with conspiracy against the Japanese Governor-General at the time, Count Terauchi. He was one of six who were convicted and sentenced to long prison terms. His experiences in prison tempered his willingness to express his nationalist ardor, but he was still considered active in the independence movement.

== Conspiracy, trial, and imprisonment ==
In 1911 Yun was implicated in assisting with an assassination attempt on Japanese Governor-General, Terauchi Masatake. Sources from within some of the Enlightenment Movement groups that Yun had taken part in had informed Japanese officials that he had a hand in planning this attempted assassination. He was put on trial and given the maximum sentence. However, after a series of retrials his sentence was shortened and he eventually gained amnesty after only six years in jail. During this time, he didn't write down anything in his diaries, but his experience in the Japanese prison system seemed to have a significant effect on his actions after his release. In fact, his release can be seen as a turning point for Yun Ch'iho where he began to make many pro-Japanese statements and gives much less support to Korean nationalistic movements.

== March First Movement ==
Inspired by Woodrow Wilson's idea of "self-determination" presented at the Paris Peace Conference the previous year, on 1 March 1919, many Koreans took to the streets in a peaceful protest to demonstrate that Korea was ready for independence from Japan. Yun knew that the European nations would not take this demonstration seriously. Yun said the following about the movement: "He who buys a field and keeps it from falling into irredeemable hands is a wiser patriot than he who sells his lands to finance the independent movement. He who sends a poor boy to school to become more intelligent than his fathers is doing a greater service than he who stirs up students for political agitations. He who leads an erring man into decent religious life is serving the Korean race better than he who sends ignorant folks to jail for yelling 'mansei'. Now is the time for Koreans to learn and wait."

== Collaboration with the Japanese ==
Yun's reversal in opinion took an even larger turn from his previous nationalistic rhetoric when he began supporting the Japanese war effort during World War II. He urged the young men of Korea to help the Japanese achieve victory by assisting in the war effort. He celebrated as the Japanese pushed Western imperialist powers out of Asia. According to Yun, the Korean people's part in the Japanese Empire offered them opportunity and access to education and resources they previously never had. Yun said, "The intellectuals of Korea today all realize that destiny of the Korean people can be promoted by becoming one with the Japanese people and that Manchuria and North China have opened up a field for the development of the Korean people never before dreamed of."

=== World War II ===
The Suyang Club Incident (수양동우회사건), an incident that arrested the members of the Suyang club (a Korean enlightenment movement organization) for propagating prints that were titled as "The role of christians to saving the nation that has fallen(to the japanese)", had occurred in 1936. Yun made a personal guarantee of the members that were related to the incident and all were released. At that time, he endeavored for Ahn Chang-ho's acquittal, and also filed a petition for Ahn Chang-ho. but was refused by the Japanese Government-General of Korea. In 1938, the Heungeup Club Incident (흥업구락부사건) occurred, and he similarly guaranteed the personality of all the members related to the incident with the promise of no future bad behavior and all of them are released. During the Japanese colonial era, he was strongly against Japanese rule of Korea, and he did not attend Japanese government and Governor-general related events. In 1940, he was brought to book for reason of being absent for the event from the Japanese Government-General of Korea.

In 1939, Japanese Government-General of Korea ordered the implementation of the Sōshi-kaimei policy, a policy that attempted to change Koreans' names into Japanese format. Yun was going to propose a postponement of the order, because of the national sentiment held by the Koreans. The proposal was considered acceptable by the Japanese Government-General of Korea, and the Japanese Government-General of Korea postponed the implementation of the policy to next year. In May 1940, his family was at the Japanese Government-General of Korea conference for the decision regarding his Sōshi-kaimei. His family name was changed Ito (이토; 伊東) and thus Sōshi-kaimei for him (that was done in a coercive fashion) was Ito Chikho.

After the Japan–Korea Treaty of 1910, he largely boycotted Japanese official events. In the 1940s, he was finally brought to book for Japanese Government-General of Korea. During this time he was under surveillance, and was internally investigated. In 1943, he was appointed to the position of advisor of Japanese Government-General of Koreas Privy Council (중추원; 中樞院), as the Japanese enforced their demands.

== Death ==
In 1945, he was elected to the Japanese House of Peers. However, Korea achieved independence from Japanese occupation later that year with the Surrender of Japan.

In October 1945, he sent two copies of a letter titled "An Old Man's Ruminations" (한 노인의 명상록), one to John R. Hodge and the other to Syngman Rhee and Kim Ku. He did not receive a response from either. In November 1945, he returned to Korea, and died in GoryeoJeong in Kaesong in December (some allege that he committed suicide, although there is no evidence to support this). He was 80 years old.

Yun Ch'iho was the uncle of Yun Bo-seon, who was President of South Korea in 1960 and Yun Il-seon, the first Korean pathologist and anatomist.

== See also ==
- Chang Myon
- Chinilpa
- Kim Kyu-sik
- Kim Okkyun
- Park Jung-yang
- Pak Yŏnghyo
- Yun Chi-Oh
- Yun Chi-Young
