= Im Ch'ijŏng =

Korean independence activist (1880–1932)

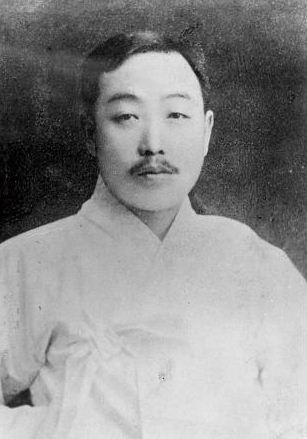

Korean name
- Hangul: 임치정
- Hanja: 林蚩正
- RR: Im Chijeong
- MR: Im Ch'ijŏng

Art name
- Hangul: 춘곡
- Hanja: 春谷
- RR: Chungok
- MR: Ch'un'gok

Im Ch'ijŏng (Korean: 임치정; Hanja: 林蚩正; September 26, 1880 – January 9, 1932) was a Korean independence activist.

== Biography ==
=== Early life ===
Im was born in 1880 in South Pyongan Province, Joseon. Im received 7–8 years of education before leaving school in 1900. Three years later, at the age of 23, Im traveled to Oahu, Hawaii to work as a labourer. In Hawaii he worked on a plantation and educated himself in his spare time. It was during this period that Im developed nationalistic sentiments.

By 1904, Im had moved to San Francisco where he began learning English formally. While a student, he met Ahn Chang-ho, a Korean independence activist and one of the early leaders of the Korean-American immigrant community in the United States.

=== Participation of the Korean Independence movement in the US ===
At the end of the Russo-Japanese War in 1905, Japan invaded and colonized Korea. Horrified that their country's sovereignty was under threat, Im, Ahn, and other like-minded Koreans formed a group which later became the New People's Association, a clandestine organization whose aim was to foster the independence and national strength of the Korean Empire, by promoting national feeling among Koreans and Korean-Americans living in America. The New People's Association also served as the unofficial Korean consulate in America while Korea was under Japanese rule.

In November 1905, Korea was pressured into signing the Eulsa Treaty, which handed full control of the Korean peninsula to Japan. Following this, Im and others formed a nationalist newspaper called Gong-lib Shinbo, of which Im was chief administrator, to campaign for their country and to promote national pride. Japan viewed the activities of Im's organisations with disfavour, but were unable to take any action on American soil.

Im was also a leader in Shinminhoe, a Korean-American immigrant community group, and served as secretary for The Korea Daily News.

== Korean Independence Movement ==
In 1906, Ahn Chang-ho returned to Korea, bringing the New People's Association with him. Im followed in 1907. They established bases in first in Pyongyang and Seoul, then nationwide. They supported education, industrialization, and military action for independence.

== 105-Man Incident ==
In 1910, Im was implicated after an attempt was made to assassinate Masatake Terauchi, the Governor-General of Korea (Chôsen Sôtoku). A young Korean man named An Myeong-Gun, was alleged to have attempted to shoot Terauchi at Suncheon Station. An was a cousin of An Jung-geun, a Korean independence activist who assassinated Itō Hirobumi (伊藤博文), the first Prime Minister of Japan and then-Japanese Resident-General of Korea in 1906. The event would later become known as the Suncheon Incident or the 105 Man Incidents.

After the failed attempt, the Governor-General arrested over 700 Koreans. In 1912, 122 were tried, and 105 sentenced to imprisonment with hard labor. In the end, only six Koreans had their sentences imposed, and even they were amnestied in 1915.

It has been claimed that the plot was fabricated by the Japanese authorities to weaken and discredit the Korean independence movement. Certainly, after the failed attempt to assassinate Terauchi, the New People's Association came under close scrutiny. After Im and other key members of the New People's Association were captured, the organization was disbanded.

== March 1st Movement ==
In February 1919, after two Korean independence fighters - Jung Shung Kyong and Lee Sung Hun – were jailed, Im and other members of the New People's Association set about planning a mass protest against Japanese occupation. The March First Movement was one of the earliest public displays of Korean resistance during the Japanese occupation of Korea. On March 1, 1919, Im's comrades began their four-week-long protest in Nampo, North Korea. The campaign was violent and many of the protesters were jailed, but there was a major shift in Japanese imperial policy towards Korea. Although Im was not directly involved in the protest, he was recognized as one of its architects.

== Death and legacy ==
In 1923, in order to continue the Korean Independence Movement, Im and his fellow activists established another nationalist newspaper Shi Dae Ilbo.

Im retired in 1928 and the newspaper stopped publishing due to internal conflicts and pressure from the Japanese. Im's dedication to the Korean Independence Movement had begun to take a toll on his health. He became distressed by Japan's stranglehold over his country, and the inability of the Korean Independence Movement to loosen it. He turned to alcohol as a way of coping with the pain and stress.

On January 10, 1932, Im died of a cerebral hemorrhage in Seodaemun District, Seoul, Korea.

In 1968, the Korean government officially recognized Im's efforts for the Korean Independence Movement by awarding him with the Order of Merit for National Foundation in the grade of Independence Medal.

In January 2007, Korea's Ministry of Patriots' and Veterans' Affairs, (South Korea) further recognized Im's achievement by presenting him as an Independence Movement Fighter of the Month.
