= John McLeavy Brown =

Irish civil servant (1835–1926)

Sir John McLeavy Brown, CMG (27 November 1835 – 6 April 1926) was an Irish civil servant in the British Colonial Service.

Brown was born in Magheragall, Lisburn, Ireland. After attending Queen's University Belfast and Trinity College Dublin, McLeavy Brown made his way to China, where at age 32 he became first secretary to the Burlingame Mission, the first Chinese diplomatic mission to the United States and Europe.

A lawyer by trade, he later joined the Customs Service in April 1873. In 1874, he was appointed Deputy Commissioner in Canton.

McLeavy Brown impressed his superior, Sir Robert Hart, to the extent that Hart offered him the position of manager of Korea's Customs Department. While serving in this capacity he was offered, by King (later Emperor) Kojong, a position as financial advisor and Chief Commissioner of Customs in 1893.

At the time of his appointment the Japanese legation was in the ascendency. Following the murder of Queen Min in 1895, the King fled, but not before signing a decree giving McLeavy Brown absolute control over the treasury.

Following Japan's victory in the Russo Japanese War Japan began to exert more control over Korea and in August 1905 McLeavy Brown left the Customs Department and Korea.

In 1913 he was appointed Counsellor to the Chinese Legation in London, a position he held until his death in 1926.
