= Independence Club =

1896–1898 political party in Korea

- Leader: Philip Jaisohn
- Founded: July 2, 1896
- Dissolved: December 25, 1898
- Succeeded by: Chinilpa (factions) (Note: Among Chinilpa people former Independent Club's were Yun Chi-ho, Lee Wan-yong, Gwon Jung-hyeon, etc.); Tongnip Undongga (factions) (Note: Tongnip Undongga means "independence activist [against Japanese colonial rule]" (독립운동가) in Korean. Among Tongnip Undongga people former Independent Club's were Philip Jaisohn, Kim Kyu-sik, Yi Dong-nyeong, Sin Chaeho, Syngman Rhee, etc.)
- Headquarters: Seoul (People's joint association)
- Newspaper: Tongnip sinmun
- Ideology: Liberalism; Radicalism; Korean nationalism Constitutional monarchy Anti-Qing dynasty Anti-Russian sentiment Factions: Republicanism
- Political position: Centre-left to left-wing
- National affiliation: People's Joint Association
- Jungchuwon (Note: in 1898): 169 / 300

Korean name
- Hangul: 독립협회
- Hanja: 獨立協會
- RR: Dongnip hyeophoe
- MR: Tongnip hyŏphoe

The Independence Club (Korean: 독립협회; Hanja: 獨立協會), alternate name Independence Association, was an organization that advocated for Korean independence. It operated between July 2, 1896, and December 25, 1898, and was founded and led by the prominent Korean independence activist Philip Jaisohn.

The group advocated for numerous reforms for both government and society, including democracy, public education, journalism, and language reform. The group also published a newspaper:Tongnip sinmun ("The Independent").

Its advocacy for reforming the government into a constitutional monarchy brought it into conflict with the Korean monarch Gojong as well as conservatives in the court. The club was eventually ordered to disband in December 1898.

== Background ==
A number of reform movements existed in the late Joseon and Korean Empire periods.

=== Seo Jaepil ===
Seo Jaepil, also known as "Philip Jaisohn", was an early prominent leader of the Korean independence movement. He was one of the leaders of the attempted Kapsin Coup of 1884. He then traveled to the United States, studied there, married an American woman, acquired United States citizenship, and earned a medical degree from the University of Washington.

Seo returned to Korea in early 1896 and soon afterward was offered a position as consultant to the Privy Council. Preferring to have greater freedom of action, he refused the position, but agreed to serve as an adviser to the throne, a position which broadened his contacts among prominent government leaders.

== Formation ==
A number of political organizations came into being in Korea during the 1890s, each formed with the hope of securing the nation's independence and the rights of the people. Each group tackled the problem of national independence from a different direction. The most energetic of these organizations was also the first to form. On July 2, 1896, Philip Jaisohn and Yi Sang-jae, Yun Chi-ho formally inaugurated the Independence Club (Doklip-hyuphoe). Minister of War An Kyong-su served as the club's first president and Foreign Minister Yi Wan-yong served as its chairman.

The Independence Club drew its early membership of about 30 men from other like-minded groups, from incumbent politicians and former government officials. Members came from the Chongdong Club, founded by Yun Chi-ho and Yi Sang-jae, both active in Korea's diplomatic affairs, and from the Konyang Club (a name that symbolized the end of Korea's vassal relationship with China), founded by Yu Kil-chun and other leaders of the reforms of 1894. As criticism of the government and its policies mounted, a number of the higher level officials associated with the Independence Club thought it wise to resign their positions for political reasons. In their place came representatives of the new intelligentsia, men influenced by Western culture whose ideology developed from the Confucian reformist idea of "Eastern ways, Western machines."

== Organization ==
The Independence Club was composed of young classical radicals and reformers. The mainstream of the Independence Club supported the constitutional monarchy, but it was suspected that some members were republicans.

The selection of officers and the conduct of club business was handled democratically. Matters of importance were decided by a simple majority of the members present. In time, the Independence Club expanded its network of members into the countryside. After sufficient branches had been established in provincial towns, one group in each province became the liaison group that maintained regular contact with the club's headquarters in Seoul.

== Activities ==
As it became more of a citizen's assembly, the Independence Club moved beyond symbolic activities and began to initiate direct social and political action programs.

=== Tongnip sinmun ===
The first priority was to launch a campaign of public education. To this end, it established Tongnip sinmun, the club's newspaper. One of the first projects undertaken by the paper was an attempt to establish some tangible symbol of Korean independence.

=== Reforms to Seoul ===
Seo proposed that Yeongeunmun ("Gate of Welcoming Grace"), long considered a symbol of Korean subservience to China, be torn down and replaced with a new gate.

Second, he proposed that the Mohwagwan (모화관; 慕華館), the guest quarters where Chinese embassies had been entertained, be renovated and that an Independence Hall (독립관; 獨立館) and Independence Park be created there.

In August 1896, within days after the proposals, the "Independence Association" was founded. The citizens responded with not only support, but sizable contributions as well. Even the royal family and many of the government's highest officials contributed to the Independence Club projects. Crown Prince Yi-Chak made a financial contribution to the group as a token of his cooperation. Within three months, membership in the association grew to nearly ten thousand. The groundbreaking and cornerstone laying ceremony was carried out in November.

=== Policy advocacy ===
The group urged Korea to adopt a foreign policy based on independence and neutrality, one that rejected Western foreign policy and would show no favor to any foreign power seeking to advance its parochial interests in the peninsula.

It also advocated for civil rights and democracy. It demanded full equality of all people, the rights of free speech and assembly, the right of the individual to the security of his person and property, and the doctrine of the sovereignty of the people.

It also sought to improve education by advocating for the establishment of schools in every village. It also advocated for improvements to commercial and industrial infrastructure in Korea. They also urged the development of a more modern national defense capability, including a navy.

== Clash with the government and disbanding the club ==
The Independence Club launched a movement to establish a national assembly in April 1898. In October 1898 the club held demonstrations in front of palace in response to the government's attempts to revise repressive pre-Gabo laws. Participants included yangban, students, monks, merchants, and other commoners, as well as outcastes. The club mobilized a thousand people a day, causing great public excitement, and appears to have come close to forcing Gojong to give into their demands for an appointed assembly.

In October 1898, the club announced six requirements to the Emperor Gojong. The 6 were following:

1. Neither officials nor people shall depend upon foreign aid, but shall do their best to strengthen and uphold the imperial power.
2. All documents pertaining to foreign loans, the hiring of foreign soldiers, the granting of concessions, etc., in fact every document drawn up between the Korean government and a foreign party or firm, shall be signed and sealed by all the Ministers of State and the President of the Privy Council.
3. Important offenders shall be punished only after they have been given a public trial and ample opportunity to defend themselves.
4. To his Majesty shall belong the power to appoint Ministers, but in case a majority of the Cabinet disapproves of the Emperor's nominee he shall not be appointed.
5. All sources of revenue and methods of raising taxes shall be placed under the control of the Finance Department, no other department, officer or corporation being allowed to interfere therewith; and the annual estimates and balances shall be made public.
6. The existing laws and regulations shall be enforced without fear or favour.

The Independence Club took "loyalty to the emperor and patriotism for the country" as its motto. The organization tried to criticize the government for corruption, while not directly insulting Emperor Gojong, distinguish him from his "wicked" officials. Gojong, however, seems to have seen the Independence Club as a threat to his power. When the club voted to recall Pak Yŏnghyo from Japan to sit in the assembly, conservatives in the court struck back. Conservatives charged that the club was plotting to overthrow the Emperor, and on November 5, 1898, seventeen club members were arrested. This resulted in bloody street battles in November that brought Seoul to a state of near anarchy. The Emperor condemned the club, saying it had "ignored government orders, rudely repudiated the court, and expelled the ministers." He resented that the club members did not heed his ordinances ordering them to curb their activities, and he ordered the organization be dissolved. After continued riots, in December 1898 Gojong enforced martial law and arrested 340 leaders of the Independence Club, sent troops to break up demonstrations, and forbade popular assemblies. Several of the leaders went into exile. Gojong preferred to uphold royal authority rather than risk opening the political system to public participation. The following years saw the Emperor work to consolidate monarchical power, and discourage public opposition.
