= November 1905 =

Month of 1905

<<	November 1905					>>
Su	Mo	Tu	We	Th	Fr	Sa
			1	2	3	4
5	6	7	8	9	10	11
12	13	14	15	16	17	18
19	20	21	22	23	24	25
26	27	28	29	30

The following events occurred in November 1905:

November 21, 1905: Albert Einstein publishes his paper of mass-energy equivalence, introducing E=mc²

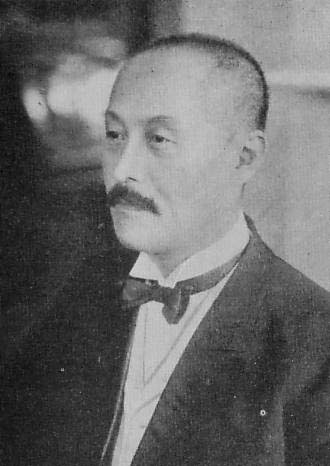
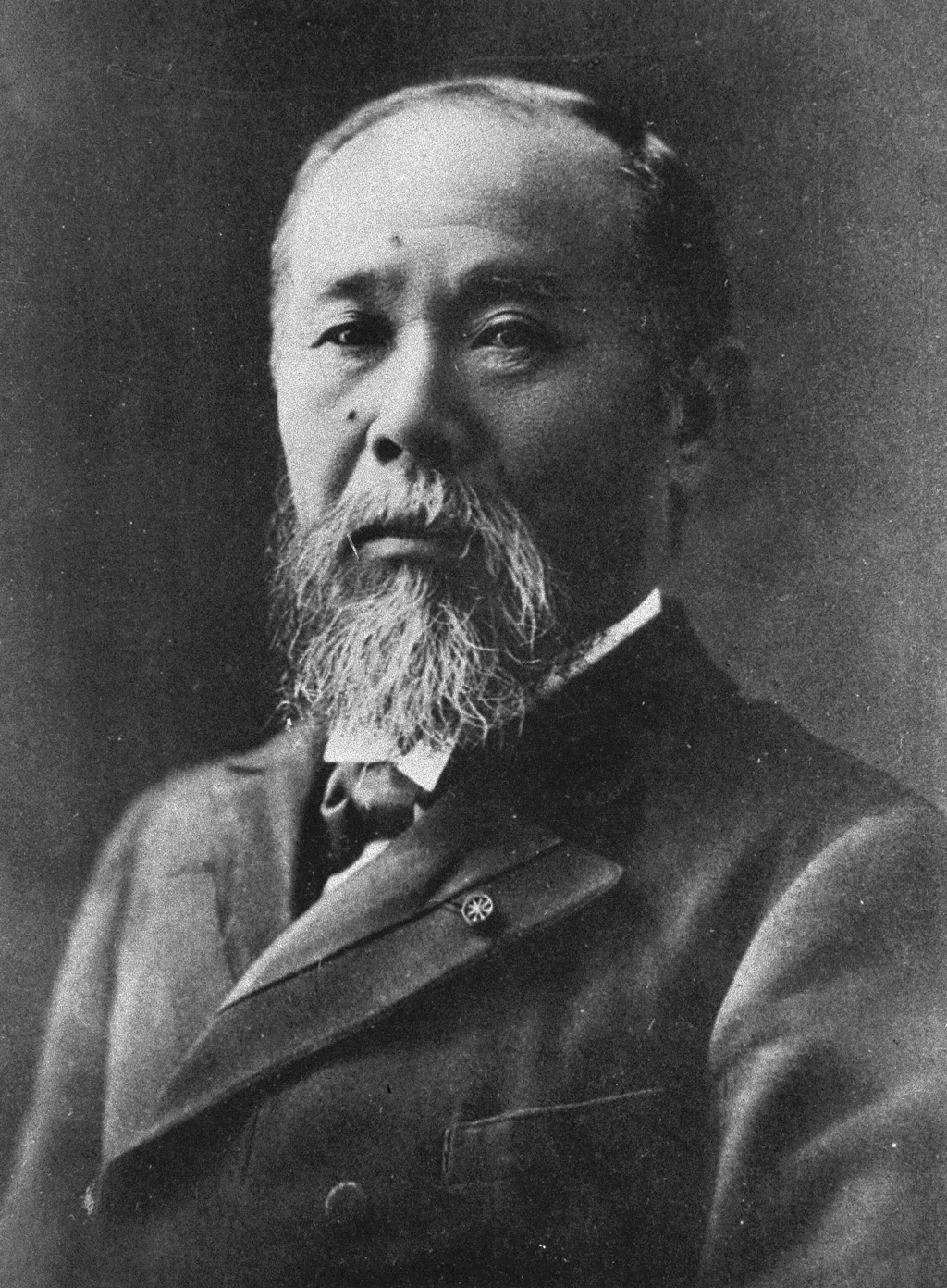
November 17, 1905: Agreement to make Korea a Japanese protectorate is signed by Foreign Minister Pak Chesoon and Japan Premier Ito Hirobumi

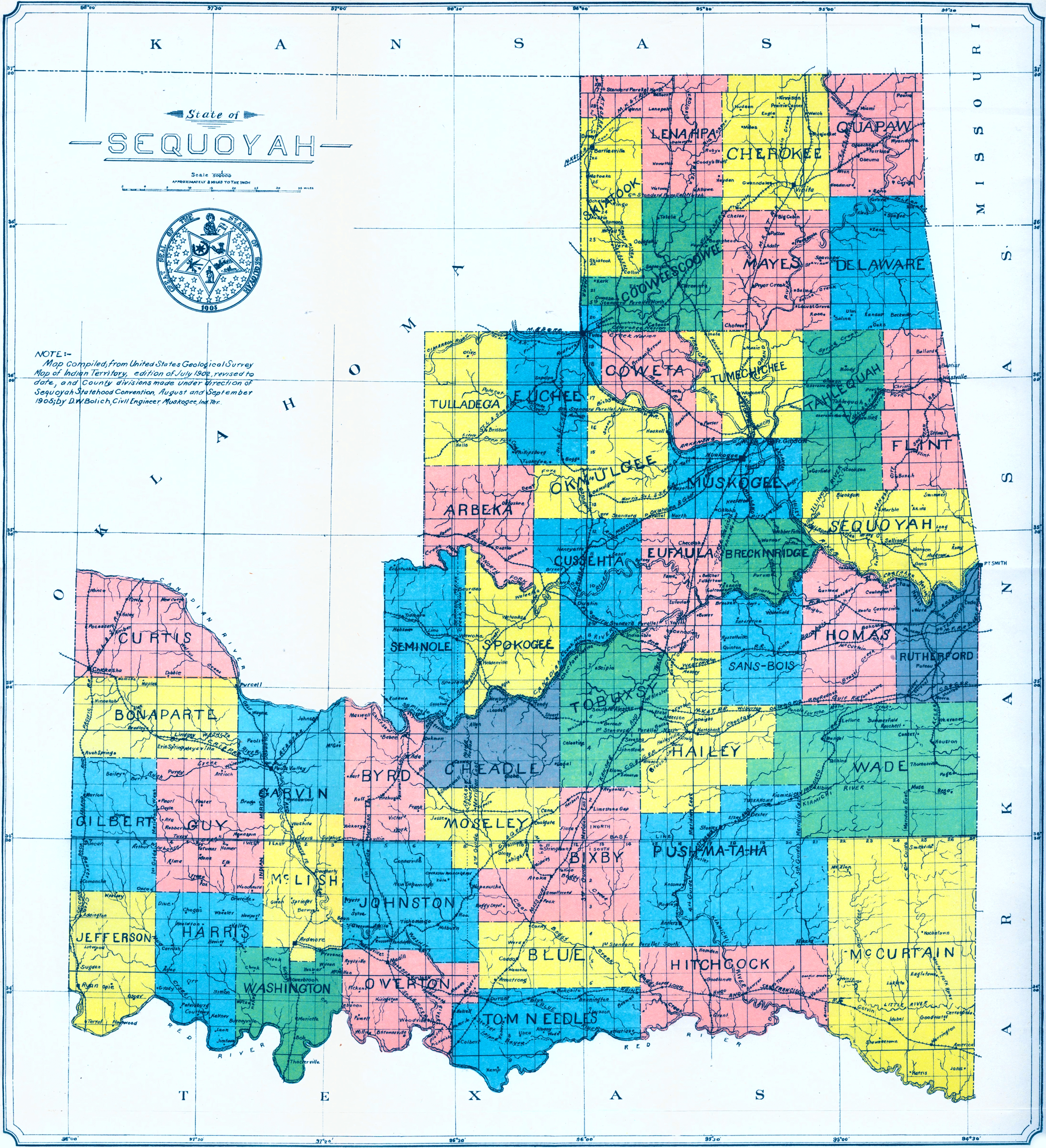
November 17, 1905: The proposed U.S. state of Sequoyah is endorsed by Native American voters in the U.S. Indian Territory

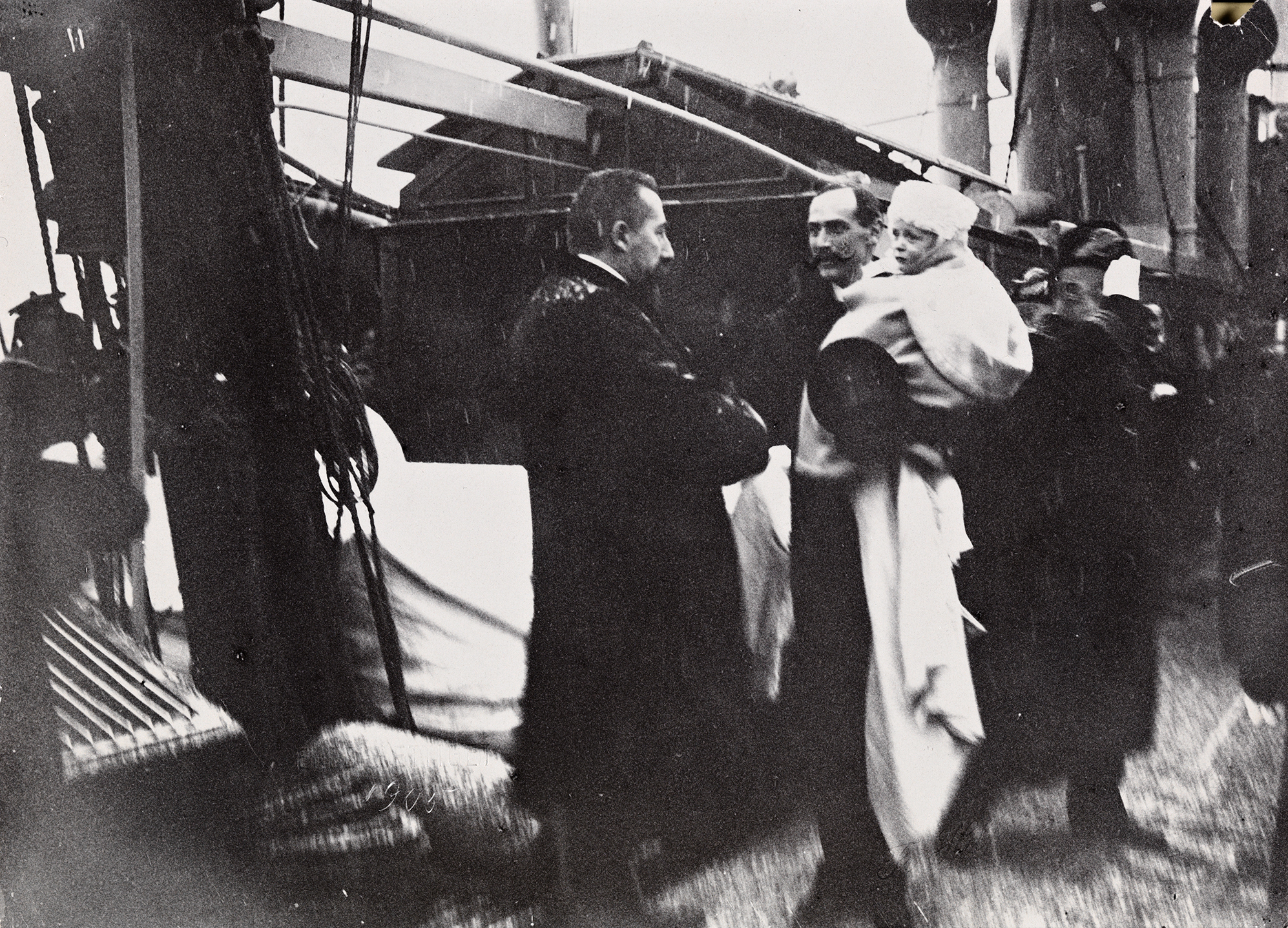
November 21, 1905: Prince Carl of Denmark arrives in Norway with his son Prince Alexander (later King Olav V), and prepares to become King Haakon VII.

== November 1, 1905 (Wednesday) ==
- The Committee of Ministers of the Russian Empire was created by a decree of Tsar Nicholas II (October 19 old style, November 1 new style), two days after the October Manifesto, as the first cabinet of advisers to jointly discuss national policy, and former finance minister Sergei Witte was appointed as the chairman of the committee, in effect becoming Russia's first prime minister.
- Lahti, a city in the Grand Duchy of Finland within Russia, was granted city rights by Tsar Nicholas II of Russia, in his capacity as Grand Duke of Finland.
- Died: Sergei Legat, 30, Russian ballet dancer who had been the first to portray the title character in Pyotr Tchaikovsky's The Nutcracker, committed suicide by slashing his throat.

== November 2, 1905 (Thursday) ==
- The death of the wife of U.S. parachutist Charles Broadwick became the tragic inspiration for his invention of the parachute pack. Maude Broadwick was present with her husband at a carnival in Anderson, South Carolina, and the two rode upward on a balloon. At the time, the practice was for the parachutist to be suspended beneath the balloon, and then to drop from high enough for the parachute to fill with air on the way down. Maude fell 200 feet (61 m) to her death from the balloon, with Charles unable to assist her. The following year, Charles Broadwick developed a chute that could be folded into a backpack, and opened by a static line attached to the balloon.
- Born:
  - Georges Schéhadé, Egyptian-born Lebanese playwright; in Alexandria, Egypt (d. 1989)
  - Isobel Andrews, Scottish-born New Zealand playwright; in Glasgow (d. 1990)
- Died: Albert von Kölliker, 88, Swiss zoologist

== November 3, 1905 (Friday) ==
- Tsar Nicholas II continued his reforms, ending Russian censorship of the press and of private dispatches, as well as granting amnesty to political prisoners.
- Born: Lois Mailou Jones, African-American painter; in Boston (d. 1998)
- Died: Eliza Thompson, 89, U.S. crusader against sales of liquor and activist within the temperance movement in the late 19th century, creator of the "Visitation Band" practice used in 23 states for peacefully putting bars and liquor stores out of business

== November 4, 1905 (Saturday) ==
- Tsar Nicholas II of Russia ordered the grant of self-government to the Grand Duchy of Finland, ordering the Russian-appointed Senate of Finland to put forward a proposal for parliamentary reform, with an elected, unicameral parliament and universal and equal suffrage. The "November Manifesto" was a reversal of the infamous February Manifesto that had removed the veto of the Diet over matters considered by the Emperor to concern Russian imperial interests.
- The Rolland-Pilain automobile company was formed in France by François Rolland and Émile Pilain at Tours. The company would cease manufacturing in 1927 because of financial troubles.
- Born:
  - Dragutin Tadijanović, Croatian poet; in Rastušje, Kingdom of Croatia-Slavonia, Austro-Hungarian Empire (d. 2007)
  - Nannie Doss, American serial killer who confessed to murdering 11 people between 1927 and her 1954 arrest; in Blue Mountain, Alabama (d. 1965)

== November 5, 1905 (Sunday) ==
- Orville Wright and Wilbur Wright dismantled their revolutionary Wright Flyer III airplane and put it in storage to prevent competitors from learning its technology.
- Paul Déroulède, founder of the nationalist League of Patriots, was welcomed back to Paris after a six-year exile. Déroulède was one of several French citizens who had taken advantage of a law of amnesty.
- Died: Lady Florence Dixie, 50, Scottish book author, feminist and war correspondent, died of diphtheria.

== November 6, 1905 (Monday) ==
- Swiss engineer Alfred Büchi received the first patent for his invention of the turbocharger for motors, as he was granted patent No. 204,630 from the German Patent and Trade Mark Office (Deutsches Patent- und Markenamt) for his invention, a "highly supercharged compound engine, using an axial compressor, radial piston engine and axial turbine on a common shaft."
- Lord Lansdowne, Foreign Secretary of the United Kingdom, declared to skeptics that the newly revealed alliance between the British Empire and the Japanese Empire was not intended as a threat to any other nation.
- Died:
  - Sir George Williams, 84, British philanthropist who founded (in 1844) the Young Men's Christian Association (YMCA)
  - William J. Le Moyne, 74, American stage actor

== November 7, 1905 (Tuesday) ==
- By a margin of 56,279 in favor and 9,073 against, voters in the Indian Territory of the United States voted overwhelmingly to approve a resolution petitioning for the territory to be admitted as the State of Sequoyah, and submitting a proposed state constitution. Congress refused to consider a statehood resolution for a mostly Native American state, and Sequoyah and the mostly white Oklahoma Territory to the west would be joined together as a single State of Oklahoma on November 16, 1907.
- Lawyer and liberal politician Karl Staaff became Prime Minister of Sweden, after a Riksdag election based mainly on voting rights reform, and replaced Christian Lundeberg.
- In elections in the U.S., newspaper publisher William Randolph Hearst narrowly lost the race for Mayor of New York City to incumbent Mayor George B. McClellan Jr., and Hearst contested the election on the basis of fraud in counting the votes.
- A proposed amendment to the Maryland state constitution, to disenfranchise African-American voters, was rejected by voters.
- Born: William Alwyn (pen name for William Alwyn Smith), English music composer; in Northampton, Northamptonshire (d. 1985)

== November 8, 1905 (Wednesday) ==
- At Gujarat in India, Swami Shastri Yagnapurushdas survived an attempted poisoning by several of the Swamis at the Vadtal temple. He survived a second attempt as well, and went on to create, on June 5, 1907, the Hindu denomination Bochasanwasi Akshar Purushottam Swaminarayan Sanstha (BAPS).

== November 9, 1905 (Thursday) ==
- Japan's Prime Minister Itō Hirobumi arrived in Korea with Imperial Japanese Army troops, traveled to Hanseong, and personally handed the Emperor Gojong a demand to submit to a treaty allowing Japan to regulate Korea's foreign affairs.
- The new Canadian province of Alberta held its first legislative election to select members of the provincial legislature. The candidates of the Alberta Liberal Party, led by Alexander Rutherford, captured 22 of the 25 seats.
- Rioting of Russian sailors at Kronstadt killed multiple people and destroyed property.
- General Dmitri Trepov was removed from office as Governor-General of Saint Petersburg by order of the Russia's Prime Minister, Count Sergei Witte.
- Born: Erika Mann, German actress, writer and anti-Nazi political activist; in Munich (d. 1969)

== November 10, 1905 (Friday) ==
- A federal grand jury in St. Louis returned an indictment against U.S. Senator Joseph R. Burton of Kansas on charges of complicity in attempted mail fraud.

== November 11, 1905 (Saturday) ==
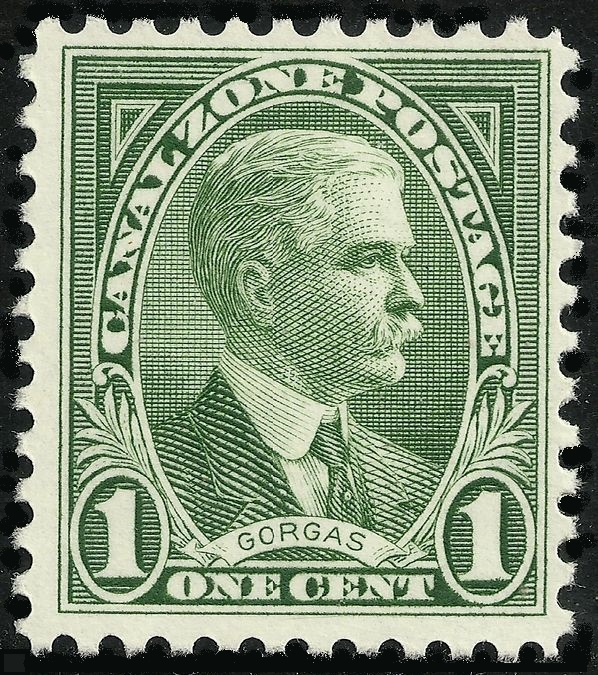
Dr. Gorgas

- The eradication of yellow fever among the workers constructing the Panama Canal was accomplished, as the last death from the disease was reported. Dr. William C. Gorgas had administered a campaign of sanitation and insect extermination campaign for several years and, upon administering the autopsy of the unidentified victim, "instructed his staff to take a good look at the man: he was, said Gorgas, the last yellow fever corpse they would see." Dr. Gorgas applied the discoveries of Cuban epidemiologist Carlos Finlay and the control strategies of Dr. Walter Reed of the U.S. Army to combat the yellow fever, which had killed thousands of workers during France's attempt to construct the Canal.

== November 12, 1905 (Sunday) ==
- The first ever Giro di Lombardia bicycle race was held, and won by Giovanni Gerbi. More than a century later, the race is one of the five monuments of one-day professional cycling (along with the Milano–Sanremo, the Tour of Flanders, the Paris–Roubaix and the Liège–Bastogne–Liège) and the last major race of the UCI World Tour.
- Cork GAA won the Ireland's national championship of hurling, defeating the England-based London GAA, 3-16 to 1-1 (equivalent to 25 to 4 based on 3-point goals and one-point scores).

== November 13, 1905 (Monday) ==
- A two-day referendum in Norway concluded, as almost 79% of the people casting ballots voted "yes" on the question "Do you agree with the Storting's authorization to the government to invite Prince Carl of Denmark to become King of Norway?" (Enig i Stortingets bemyndigelse til regjeringen om at opfordre prins Carl af Danmark til at lade sig vælge til Norges konge?). The measure passed 328,827 to 69,264.
- As the yellow fever epidemic continued in the U.S., a quarantine was declared against people entering or leaving the ports of the Deep South on the Atlantic Ocean and the Gulf of Mexico, as well as the port of Havana.
- Born: Raymond Oppenheimer, English businessman, golfer, and captain of Britain's team in the 1951 Walker Cup (d. 1984)

== November 14, 1905 (Tuesday) ==
- David Belasco's successful play The Girl of the Golden West, opened on Broadway for the first of 224 performances before going on a U.S. tour.
- Died: Robert Whitehead, 82, British engineer who invented the first self-propelled naval torpedo

== November 15, 1905 (Wednesday) ==
- After Emperor Gojong of Korea refused to sign a "protection" treaty with the Japanese Empire, Japan's Prime Minister Ito ordered Japanese troops to surround the imperial palace and threatened to have Gojong arrested.
- The six powers presented a 24-hour ultimatum to Turkey, demanding reforms of the Ottoman government, and stated that a refusal to answer would be followed by a demonstration of naval power.
- In Saint Petersburg, Social Revolutionists began a labor strike with the stated goal of ending the Russian monarchy.
- Born:
  - Annunzio Paolo Mantovani, Italian-born popular English composer, orchestra leader and recording artist, commonly referred to as Mantovani; in Venice (d. 1980)
  - Leopold Buczkowski, Polish writer and painter; in Nakwasza, Austro-Hungarian Empire (now Nakvasha, Ukraine) (d. 1989)

== November 16, 1905 (Thursday) ==
- Venezuela's President Cipriano Castro announced that the South American nation would not pay the second installment of an award to France.
- The city of Chita in Russian Siberia, Bolsheviks Viktor Kurnatovsky, Ivan Babushkin and Anton Kostiushko-Voliuzhanich proclaimed the short-lived Chita Republic and led 4,000 railway workers on a takeover of the city. The rebellion would be crushed on January 22 by Russian Army troops led by Paul von Rennenkampf and most of the leaders executed.
- Born: Nguyễn Văn Huyên, Minister of Education for North Vietnam from 1946 to 1975; in Hanoi (d. 1975)

== November 17, 1905 (Friday) ==
- The Japan–Korea Treaty of 1905, referred to as the "Eulsa Treaty", was signed at Jungmyeongjeon Hall in Hanseong by five ministers who would become known as the Five Eulsa Traitors. While the Emperor Gojong refused to sign, and Korean Prime Minister Han Kyu-seol refused to comply (and was then dismissed from office by the Emperor for impropriety), the treaty was signed by Foreign Affairs Minister Pak Chesoon, Army Minister Yi Geun-taek, Education Minister Yi Wan-yong, Agriculture and Industry Minister Gwon Jung-hyeon, and Interior Minister Lee Ji-yong. The document reduced Korea to a protectorate of the Japanese Empire.
- William IV became the new Grand Duke of Luxembourg upon the death of his father, Adolphe. He would reign for two years before suffering a debilitating stroke and die in 1912.
- Born:
  - Mischa Auer (stage name for Mikhail Unkovsky), Russian-born American comedian and film actor; in Saint Petersburg (d. 1967)
  - Princess Astrid, queen consort of Belgium as the wife of King Leopold III (killed in car accident, 1935)
- Died: Adolphe, Grand Duke of Luxembourg, 88, ruler of Luxembourg since 1890

== November 18, 1905 (Saturday) ==
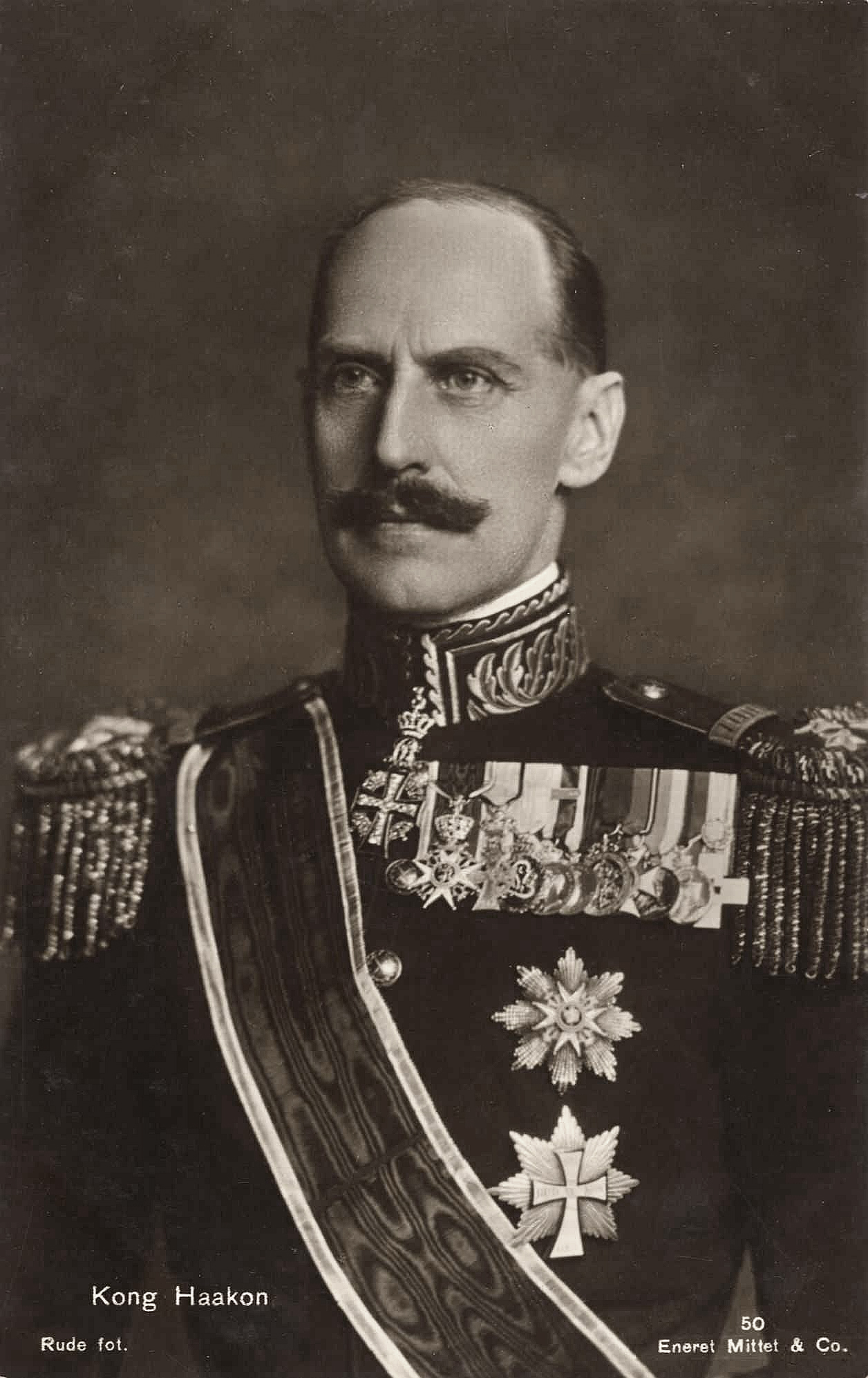
Prince Carl of Denmark elected to be King Haakon VII of Norway

- Prince Carl of Denmark, grandson of Denmark's King Christian IX was unanimously approved by the Norwegian parliament to be offered the position of King of Norway. In response, Prince Carl sent a telegram, read aloud to the Storting, that he would take the name Haakon VII and "that he would confer upon his son", Alexander, the name Olav. He would reign for 52 years.
- The sinking of British steamer SS Hilda killed 125 of the 131 people on board, after the ship struck rocks while attempting to enter Saint-Malo harbor in France. SS Hilda, operated by the London and South Western Railway Company for travel across the English Channel travel, had set off from Southampton at 10:00 pm the night before. Five passengers and one crew member survived by climbing the ship's rigging, which had remained above the water.
- Thirty-three of the crew of a German Navy torpedo boat S-128 were killed after the vessel sank near Kiel following a collision with the German cruiser Undine during naval maneuvers at Kiel.

== November 19, 1905 (Sunday) ==
- In Scotland, a fire at a lodging house killed 39 people in Glasgow and injured 24.
- Born: Tommy Dorsey, American swing music recording star and jazz trombonist with seventeen #1 hits in the 1930s and 1940s (d. 1956)

== November 20, 1905 (Monday) ==
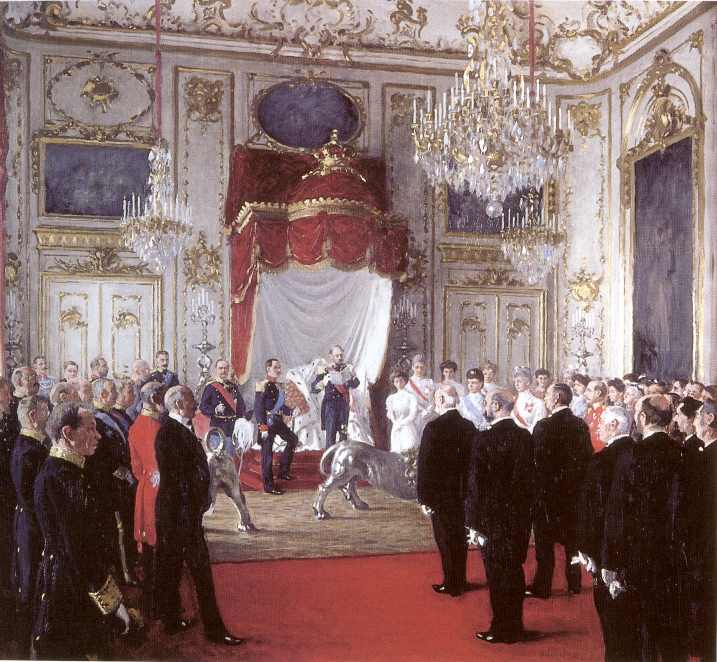
Norway's delegates meet with Denmark's king

- A group of delegates from the Storting, Norway's parliament, arrived at Amalienborg in Denmark to request approval by King Christian IX of the offer of the Norwegian throne to his grandson Prince Carl. The group was led by Storting president Carl Berner, and received the King's approval.
- The Minas Ragra mine, the world's largest source of vanadium, was discovered in Peru by an expedition of the United States Geological Survey.

== November 21, 1905 (Tuesday) ==
- Albert Einstein's groundbreaking paper on mass–energy equivalence (described in the equation E=mc²), "Ist die Trägheit eines Körpers von seinem Energieinhalt abhängig?" ("Does the Inertia of a Body Depend Upon its Energy-Content?"), was first published, appearing in the German journal Annalen der Physik.
- Austrian, Italian, French and British warships were dispatched to Piraeus in Greece to force Turkey to grant reforms in Macedonia. The allied fleet arrived on November 28 and took possession of Mitylene.

== November 22, 1905 (Wednesday) ==
- Lieutenant General Viktor Sakharov, the former Russian minister of war, was assassinated by Anastasia Bitsenko, a member of the terrorist SR Combat Organization, the Boyevaya Organzichiya. After the group had voted a death sentence on the Minister, Bitsenko infiltrated the residence of Piotr Stolypin, Governor of Saratov, in order to be allowed to meet Sakharov. When she arrived, she placed the text of the death sentence in front of him and then shot him at point-blank range. After the group had voted a death sentence on the Minister, Bitsenko infiltrated the residence of Piotr Stolypin, Governor of Saratov, in order to be allowed to meet Sakharov. When she arrived, she placed the text of the death sentence in front of him and then shot him at point-blank range.
- In Tulsa County, Oklahoma, wildcatters Robert Galbreath Jr. and Frank Chesley, were drilling for oil on farmland owned by Creek Indian Ida E. Glenn, when they had an oil gusher from what would soon be known as the Glenn Pool Oil Reserve". The discovery set off a boom of growth for the area. The population of Tulsa, Oklahoma (less than 1,400 in 1900) would increase to over 18,000 by 1910, over 72,000 by 1920 and more than 140,000 by 1930.
- Born: James Burnham, American political theorist who converted from Trotskyist socialism to conservatism at the age of 35, and became the author of numerous conservative books, beginning with The Managerial Revolution; in Chicago (d. 1987)

== November 23, 1905 (Thursday) ==
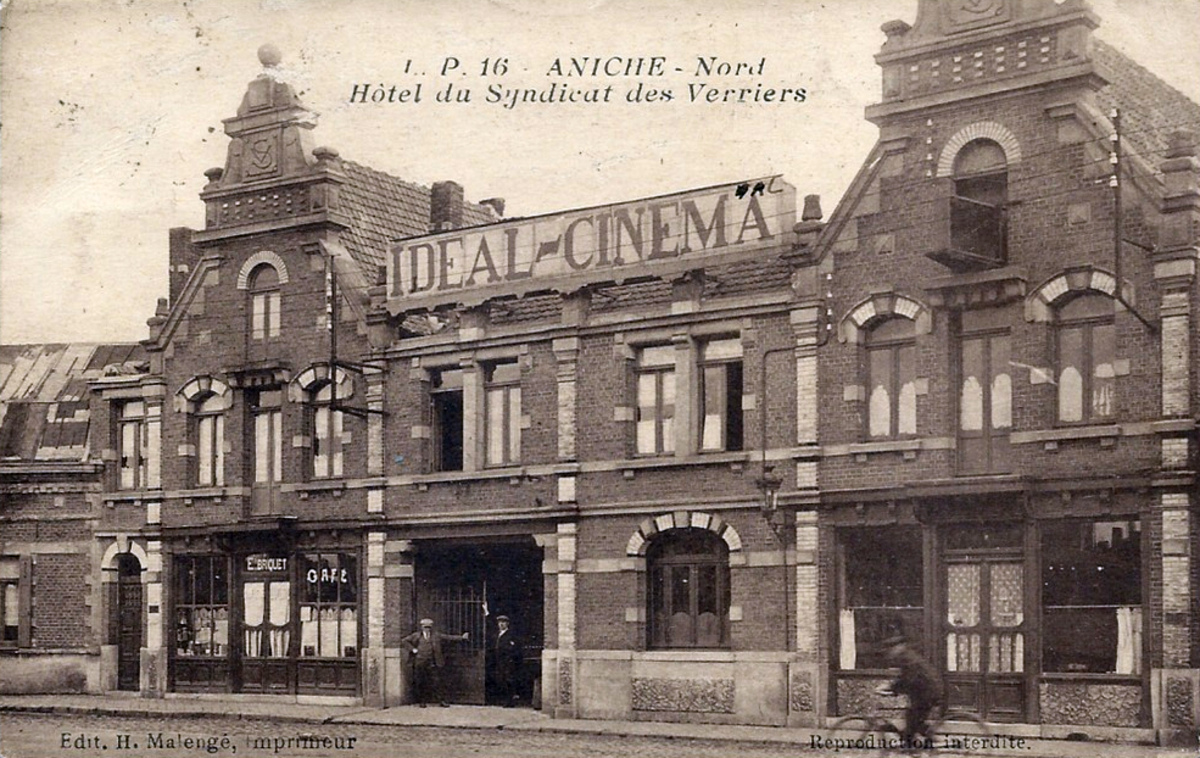
Idéal Cinéma in 1920

- L'Idéal Cinéma, the first business to brand itself as a "cinema" and to primarily show films, opened in France at Aniche in département of Nord.
- Prince Carl of Denmark, his wife Maud, and his two-year-old son Alexander departed their native country on the ship royal yacht HDMY Dannebrog in order to move to Norway, where they would become the new Norwegian royal family.
- Died:
  - Dr. John Burdon-Sanderson, 76, English physiologist known for his finding (in 1871) that the Penicillium fungus inhibited the growth of bacteria, though he did not develop its potential
  - Daniel E. Bandmann, 68, German-born American Shakespearean actor

== November 24, 1905 (Friday) ==
- The government of the Russian Empire ended press censorship, no longer requiring periodicals to have their content approved before publication. In place of pre-publication review, the Russian government introduced the "Temporary Press Regulations" which advised publishers of what content could be considered seditious or libelous, and subject to prosecution after publication.
- Admiral Fyodor Dubasov became the new Governor General of Moscow.
- The Russian zemstvo congress passed a resolution of no confidence in the government because of delays in granting universal suffrage to voters and planning for an elected constituent assembly.
- Born:
  - Harry Barris, American songwriter, singer and actor known for authoring "Mississippi Mud" (d. 1962)
  - George Herbert Walker Jr., American businessman, co-founder of the New York Mets baseball team, and namesake of U.S. President George H. W. Bush; in St. Louis (d. 1977)
  - J. C. Furnas, American author; in Indianapolis (d. 2001)
  - Leon Surmelian, Armenian-born American author; in Trabzon, Ottoman Empire (now Turkey) (d. 1995)

== November 25, 1905 (Saturday) ==
- Norway's new monarch, King Haakon VII, set foot in his new country for the first time, bringing with him his wife Maud and their son Prince Alexander, who was given the name Prince Olaf. Constituting the entire Norwegian royal family, the three arrived at Vippetangen on HDMY Dannebrog, and were welcomed by Norway's Prime Minister Christian Michelsen. The group then proceeded to the capital, Kristiania, which would be renamed Oslo in 1925.
- The unbeaten and untied Yale Bulldogs (9-0-0) faced the once-beaten and once-tied Harvard Crimson at Harvard University before a crowd in Boston of 43,000 people. Yale, which had defeated the Princeton Tigers a week before, defeated Harvard, 6 to 0.
- Died: Nahum Meir Schaikewitz, 55, Russian-born American novelist known for his popular novels (under the pen name "Shomer") in Yiddish and Hebrew, as well as a playwright

== November 26, 1905 (Sunday) ==
- A train collision killed 17 people and injured 33 in the U.S. at Lincoln, Massachusetts. The victims were stopped at the Baker Bridge station of the Boston and Maine Railroad when a faster train, the "Montreal Express" crashed from behind and telescoped the three rear cars. The engineer of the Express was charged with manslaughter, but not indicted or tried.
- A second mutiny within the Imperial Russian Navy's Black Sea Fleet began with an uprising on the cruiser Ochakov, followed by 11 other ships at Sevastopol. Lieutenant Commander Pyotr Schmidt, who had been forcibly retired on November 7, took command of the rebels.
- Joseph Stalin was selected by Bolsheviks with Gruzhia, at the time part of the Russian Empire and now the Republic of Georgia, as one of three delegates to the meeting of the Saint Petersburg Soviet.

== November 27, 1905 (Monday) ==
- The first elections in the history of the principality of Montenegro were held less than four weeks after Prince Nicholas I had announced that the nation's first constitution would be issued. Voters chose 76 members of an assembly to draft and approve a constitution.
- In Margraviate of Moravia, one of the Lands of the Bohemian Crown within the Austro-Hungarian Empire, the Moravian Compromise was agreed upon by representatives of the two major ethnic groups, speakers of the Czech language and speakers of the German language. Of the 151 deputies, 75 spoke German, and 75 spoke Czech. Moravia is now in the eastern portion of the Czech Republic.

== November 28, 1905 (Tuesday) ==
- The political party Sinn Féin was founded in Dublin by Irish nationalist Arthur Griffith, with a goal of achieving independence from Britain for all of Ireland.
- A cyclone killed at least 36 people on Lake Superior within the United States and destroyed or damaged 29 ships. All 19 crew of the freighter SS Ira H. Owen were drowned and nine of the 27 people on the SS Mataafa froze to death.
- Russia's Army and Navy, commanded by General Alexander Meller-Zakomelsky, crushed the Ochakov mutiny, bombarding the rebels' ships and barracks at Sevastopol, three hours after having delivered an ultimatum. The mutiny was defeated within 90 minutes.
- U.S. Secretary of State Frank Root determined that the Isle of Pines properly belonged to the Republic of Cuba, and urged Americans there to respect Cuba's sovereignty.
- Korea's Foreign Minister Pak Chesoon, infamous as one of the Five Eulsa Traitors who had signed the documents making Korea a protectorate of Japan, became the new Prime Minister of Korea.
- A national committee formed to propose a change in the U.S. presidential inauguration day, at the time on March 4 following November elections, voted to recommend that it be delayed to almost two months later, on the last Thursday in April. Had the constitution been amended to adapt the change, the U.S. president would have been sworn in on April 29, 1909.
- The student government of Columbia University became the first to recommend abolishing the game of football there unless rules could be changed to make the game safer.

== November 29, 1905 (Wednesday) ==
- In the largest protest against Austria's discriminatory electoral law, the Reichsratwahlordnung, a crowd of 250,000 workers demonstrated outside of the Parliament building in Vienna and rallied to demand universal suffrage in voting for the 85 seats of the Imperial Assembly (the Reichsrat). Voting was limited to a group of 4,931 men who owned large tracts of land. Lesser classes were limited to voting for the Chambers of Commerce. In all, only 17% of citizens of legal voting age were eligible to vote.
- Japan's privy council rescinded its wartime proclamation of martial law and press restrictions that had been imposed during the Russo-Japanese War.
- Telegraph service within Russia was suspended as telegraphers went on strike.
- Japan announced that its diplomatic legations to the U.S., the UK, France, Germany and Russia would all be raised to the status of embassies.
- Born: Marcel Lefebvre, French Roman Catholic archbishop who founded the Society of Saint Pius X in defiance of the Vatican, and who was excommunicated by Pope John Paul II in 1988; in Tourcoing, Nord département (d. 1991)

== November 30, 1905 (Thursday) ==
- In the most anticipated college football game of the season, the unbeaten, untied and unscored upon University of Michigan Wolverines (12-0-0) visited Chicago's Marshall Field to play against the unbeaten and untied University of Chicago Maroons (10-0-0), for what would later be recognized by the NCAA as the national championship. Michigan, coached by Fielding H. Yost, had shut out all of its opponents, 495 to 0 and rode a 56-game winning streak. The Maroons had yielded only a field goal in outscoring the teams it played against, 271 to 3. Late in the game, Michigan's Denny Clark had received a punt in the end zone and, rather than downing it behind the goal line for a touchback, attempted to run the ball back and was tackled by Chicago's Mark Catlin for a safety. The Wolverines were unable to score and the final result was Chicago 2, Michigan 0. The Yale University Bulldogs, who finished at 10-0-0 are recognized by the NCAA as the other national champions from the era.
- Spain's Prime Minister Eugenio Montero Ríos and his cabinet resigned.
- In New York City, observances were to mark the 250th anniversary of the first settlement (in 1655) by the area by European Jews.
- Died: South Korean Army General Min Young-hwan, 44, committed suicide after having failed to persuade the Emperor Gojong that the Eulsa Treaty should be annulled.
