= Yi Tojae =

Korean politician (1848–1909)

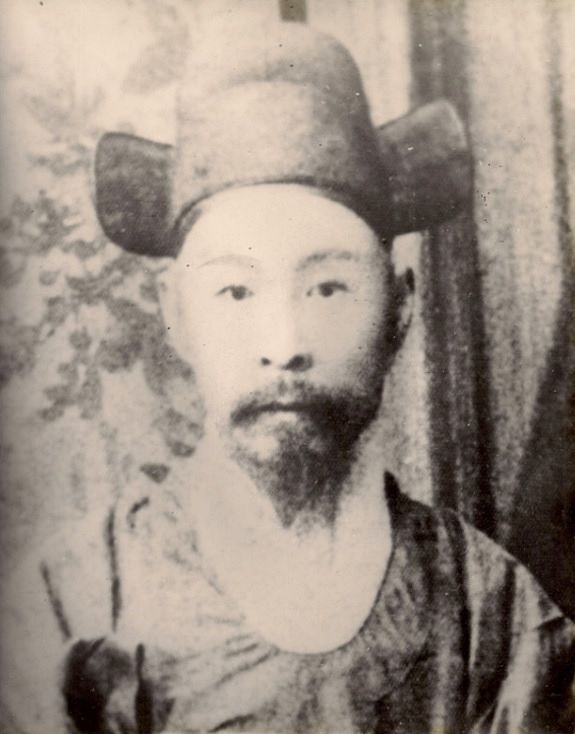
- Yi in traditional official uniform of Korea

Personal details
- Born: 1848 Hamgyong Province, Joseon Dynasty
- Died: 1909 (aged 60–61) Russian Empire
- Profession: Official

Military service
- Allegiance: Korean Empire
- Branch/service: Imperial Korean Army
- Years of service: 1895–1907
- Rank: Lieutenant General

Korean name
- Hangul: 이도재
- Hanja: 李道宰
- RR: I Dojae
- MR: I Tojae

Yi Tojae (Korean: 이도재; Hanja: 李道宰, 1848–1909) was a politician and career soldier of Imperial Korea.

== Bibliography ==
Yi passed the military examination in 1882, and was appointed as Vice administrator of the Hongmungwan. Yi was appointed as Secret royal inspector to the Gyeongsang Left Province, and reported that people in the Gyeongsang Left Province were being embezzled. On 25 June 1884 (Lunar Calendar), Yi was appointed as Mayor of the Uiju County. However, on 13 April 1886 (Lunar Calendar), Yi was sent to Gogumdo as a punishment, and returned to office on 22 June 1894 (Lunar Calendar). On 7 August 1894 (Lunar Calendar), Yi was appointed as the Vice Minister of the Ministry of Industry.

During the Donghak Peasant Revolution, Yi was ordered to reside in Jeolla Province. On 12 December 1894 (Lunar Calendar), Yi arrested Jeon Bongjun. On 29 May 1895 (Lunar Calendar), Yi was appointed as the observer of the Jeonju. Yi arrested Gim Gae nam, a Donghak leader, and executed him in 1895. On 10 October 1895 (Lunar Calendar), Yi was appointed as Lieutenant General, Chikiimgwan first class, and the Minister of Military. On 30 March 1896, Yi was appointed as First class member of the Jungchuwon. He was appointed as Minister of Education in the same year. However, resisting short cut order, he resigned his office of Minister of Education on 16 November 1896. On 27 February 1897, Yi was appointed as Special Official of the Gungnaebu.

On 1 February 1898, Yi was appointed as the Minister of the Foreign Affairs, but because of disease, Min Jong-mok served as the acting Minister from 17 February 1898. He returned on 27 February. On 25 March 1898, Yi became Minister of Agriculture and Industry. Yi and Minister of Interior Bak Jeongyang proposed the land ownership of people to the State Council of Korean Empire, and following the request, he was made one of the presidents of Land ownership section. In 1903, Yi was appointed as Minister of Foreign Affairs. During his term as the Minister of Foreign Affairs, Korea tried to become a neutral state. He firmly declared that troubles of Russia and Japan would cause a trample in Korea, which makes them to remain neutral.

Yi opposed the Japan–Korea Treaty of 1905, making him to ask the Emperor to punish the Five Eulsa Traitors. When Gojong was abdicated and Sunjong replaced him, Yi tried to invalidate the abdication with Park Yung-hyo. Yi was arrested with Bak. Yi was removed from post and Ye Wanyong succeeded his office on 22 July 1907.

Yi died in 1909. Sunjong gave of Munjeong (문정; 文貞) as the posthumous name on 5 October 1909.
