= List of prime ministers of the Korean Empire =

This is a list of prime ministers, including those of the Joseon and the Korean Empire, from when the first Korean prime minister (in the modern sense) took office in 1895, and during the early years of being under Japanese rule until 1910.

== List of prime ministers of Korea ==
No.	Portrait	Name (birth–death)	Term of office			Emperor (reign)	Ref.
No.	Portrait	Name (birth–death)	Took office	Left office	Time in office	Emperor (reign)	Ref.
1		Kim Hong-jip (1842–1896)	15 August 1894	28 May 1895	286 days	Gojong (1863–1907)	
2		Park Yung-hyo (1861–1939)	28 May 1895	31 May 1895	3 days	Gojong (1863–1907)	
3		Bak Jeongyang (1841–1904)	31 May 1895	24 August 1895	86 days	Gojong (1863–1907)	
(1)		Kim Hong-jip (1842–1896)	24 August 1895	11 February 1896	171 days	Gojong (1863–1907)	
4		Kim Byung-si (1832–1898)	11 February 1896	22 April 1896	71 days	Gojong (1863–1907)	
5		Yoon Yong-sun (1829–1904)	22 April 1896	24 September 1896	155 days	Gojong (1863–1907)	
(4)		Kim Byung-si (1832–1898)	24 September 1896	1 August 1897	311 days	Gojong (1863–1907)	
6		Shim Soon-taek (1824–1906)	1 August 1897	10 December 1897	131 days	Gojong (1863–1907)	
		?	?	?	?	Gojong (1863–1907)	
		Han Kyu-seol (1848–1930)	27 August 1905	17 November 1905	82 days	Gojong (1863–1907)	
		Pak Chesoon (1858–1916)	28 November 1905	14 June 1907	1 year, 198 days	Gojong (1863–1907)	
		Ye Wanyong (1858–1926)	14 June 1907	12 December 1909	2 years, 181 days	Sunjong (1907–1910)	
–		Pak Chesoon (1858–1916) acting	12 December 1909	11 August 1910	242 days	Sunjong (1907–1910)	
		Ye Wanyong (1858–1926)	11 August 1910	29 August 1910	18 days	Sunjong (1907–1910)	

== See also ==
- List of presidents of the Provisional Government of the Republic of Korea
- List of prime ministers of North Korea
- List of prime ministers of South Korea
