= Prime Minister of Korea =

Prime Minister of Korea may refer to:

- Prime Minister of the Korean Empire (1895–1948)
- Prime Minister of South Korea (1948–present)
- Premier of North Korea (1948–present)
