= Gwon Jung-hyeon (politician) =

Korean politician (1854–1934)

Viscount Gwon Jung-hyeon 권중현
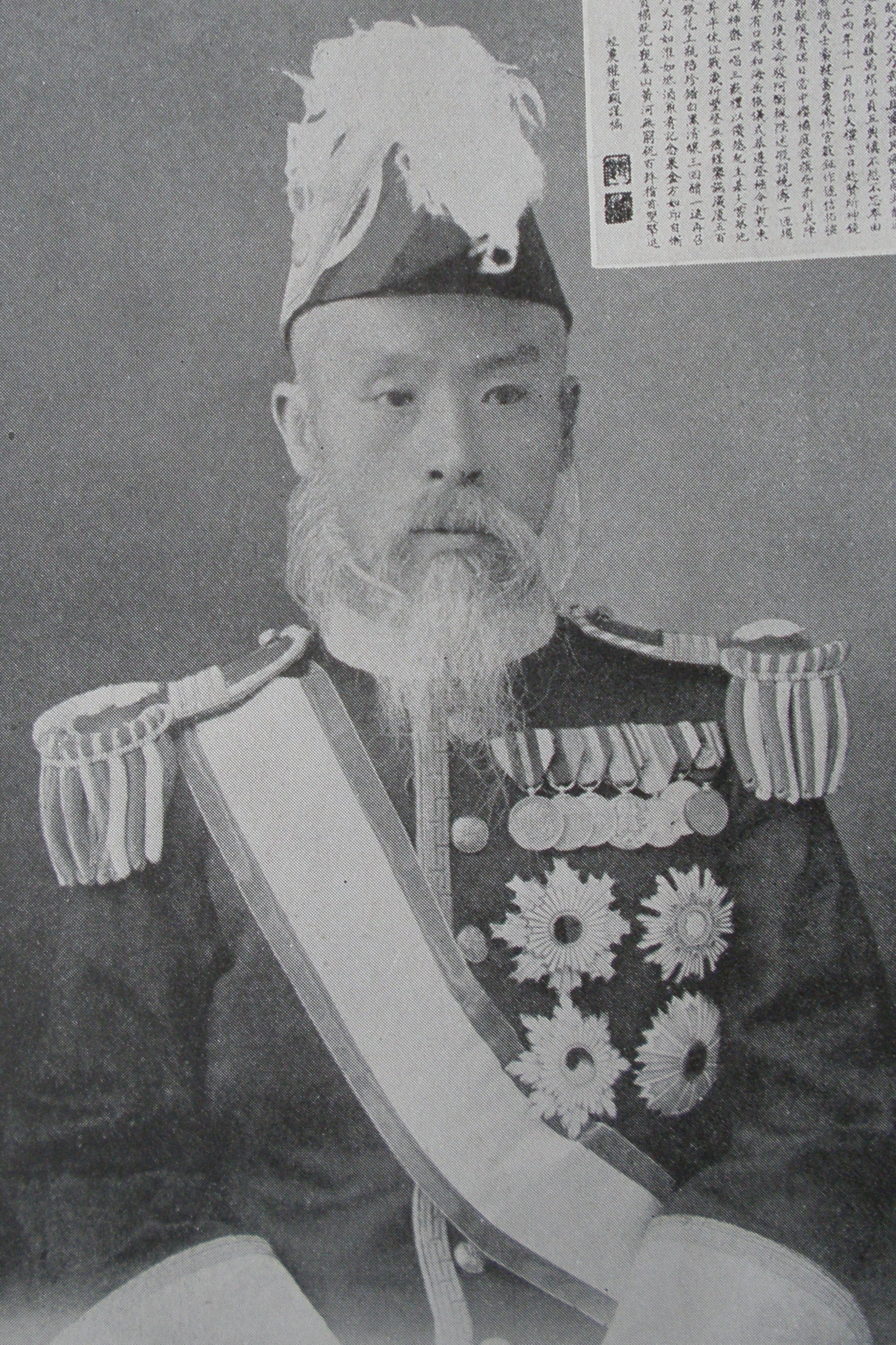
- Gwon in 1916

Minister of Justice of the Korean Empire
- In office 1899 – August 1910
- Monarch: Gojong
- Prime Minister: Pak Chesoon
- Preceded by: Office Established
- Succeeded by: Office Abolished

Minister of Agriculture, Commerce and Industry
- In office 26 September 1905 – August 1910
- Prime Minister: Han Kyu-seol
- Preceded by: Cho Tong-hui
- Succeeded by: Seong Gi-hun

Personal details
- Born: November 27, 1854 Yeongdong, Chungcheong, Joseon
- Died: March 19, 1934 (aged 79) Keijō, Korea, Empire of Japan
- Nickname: Jaehyung

Military service
- Allegiance: Joseon; Korea; Japan
- Branch: Imperial Korean Army; Imperial Japanese Army
- Years of service: 1883–1919; 1925–1934
- Rank: Lieutenant General
- Battles/wars: Russo-Japanese War

Gwon Jung-hyeon (Korean: 권중현 November 27, 1854 – March 19, 1934), also spelled Kwon Jung-hyun, was an Imperial Korean Lieutenant General and Politician. He was the Minister of Justice from 1899 to 1910 and the Minister of Agriculture, Commerce and Industry from 1905 to 1910. He is best known for being one of the Five Eulsa Traitors who signed the Eulsa Treaty of 1905 which made the Korean Empire a protectorate of the Empire of Japan. Because of his involvement in the Treaty, he was an unpopular figure in Korea and faced an assassination attempt in 1907 by an assassination group led by Na-Cheol.

== Biography ==
Gwon was born on November 27, 1854, at Yeongdong. Having learned Japanese from an early age, he joined the Gaehwa Party which was a pro-Japanese political party. In 1883, he became the secretary of the Toei Supervisory Office, and then the secretary in Japan. In 1891 he became the Customs Officer at Incheon and was involved in the signing of the Austria–Korea Treaty of 1892 with Austria-Hungary. After that, he successively held positions such as the Hanseongbu Panyun, State Council and Vice President of Pyohunwon, and in 1899 he was appointed Minister of Justice. As the Minister of Justice, Gwon led the execution of Gwon Hyeong-jin, and Ahn Gyeong-su.

From 1901, he continued to be active in the military field, such as serving as a minister of military affairs. In 1902, he became the headmaster of the Military Academy of Korean Empire and then the head of the army court. At the dawn of the Russo-Japanese War, he was appointed as a greeting agent to greet Itō Hirobumi. In 1904 he was promoted to Lieutenant General of the Imperial Korean Army. Around this time, he also served as director of the president of the Railway Agency. In July 1904, Gwon was sent to Liaoyang, and Lüshunkou District to console Japanese forces with Major Cho Seung-guen, and Captain No Baek-rin. In January 1905, Gwon was appointed as the Minister of Military.

On September 26, 1905, he was appointed as the Minister of Agriculture, Commerce and Industry as a member of Han Kyu-seol's cabinet. On November 17, 1905, Gwon signed the Eulsa Treaty with four other ministers. He had previously opposed the signing of treaty, but when Han Kyu-seol was taken away by the Japanese because he also opposed the treaty, Gwon changed his stance and assented the signing. The five bureaucrats, including Gwon Jung-hyeon were shunned as later generations retrospectively title them the Five Eulsa Traitors. In 1907, there was an assassination attempt made on him by the Eulsa Five Bandit Assassination Group led by Na-Cheol and Kang Won-sang and he was seriously injured in this attempt. He commanded his military units to put down these rebellions. In 1908, he was awarded the Grand Cordon of the Order of the Rising Sun.

When the Japan–Korea Treaty of 1910 was signed, Kwon Jung Hyun was conferred the rank of First Class Viscount on October 16 and was listed among the Korean nobility. During the period of Japanese rule, he served as an advisor to the Central House of the Governor-General of Korea and an advisor to the Korean History Compilation Committee. In 1912, he received the Korea Annexation Commemorative Medal and was promoted to Senior Fifth Rank .

In 1919, he submitted his resignation and resigned as an advisor to the Central House, but after that he requested the governor-general of Korea, Makoto Saitō, to return, and in 1925 he was appointed as an advisor to the Korean History Compilation Committee. He was reinstated as an advisor to the Central House during the period of Governor-General Hanzō Yamanashi.

== Legacy ==
Gwon's legacy remains heavily controversial among the Korean populace as he was known as a collaborator with the Japanese forces. He was listed in the Korean History Compilation Committee's List of 708 Pro-Japanese Collaborators along with the other four Five Eulsa Traitors in 2002. He was also listed in the List of Pro-Japanese Groups by the Institute for Ethnic Issues in 2008 and in the List of 106 Pro-Japanese National Acts by the Pro-Japanese and Anti-National Behavior Truth Correction Committee. In 2007, the Investigative Commission on Pro-Japanese Collaborators' Property seized his property along with the property of his adopted son, Gwon Tae-hwan. In a survey conducted on the lineage of nobility in 1960, his grandson was working at an Antique Art Association.
