= Pak Chŏngyang =

Joseon politician (1841–1905)

Pak Chŏngyang 박정양
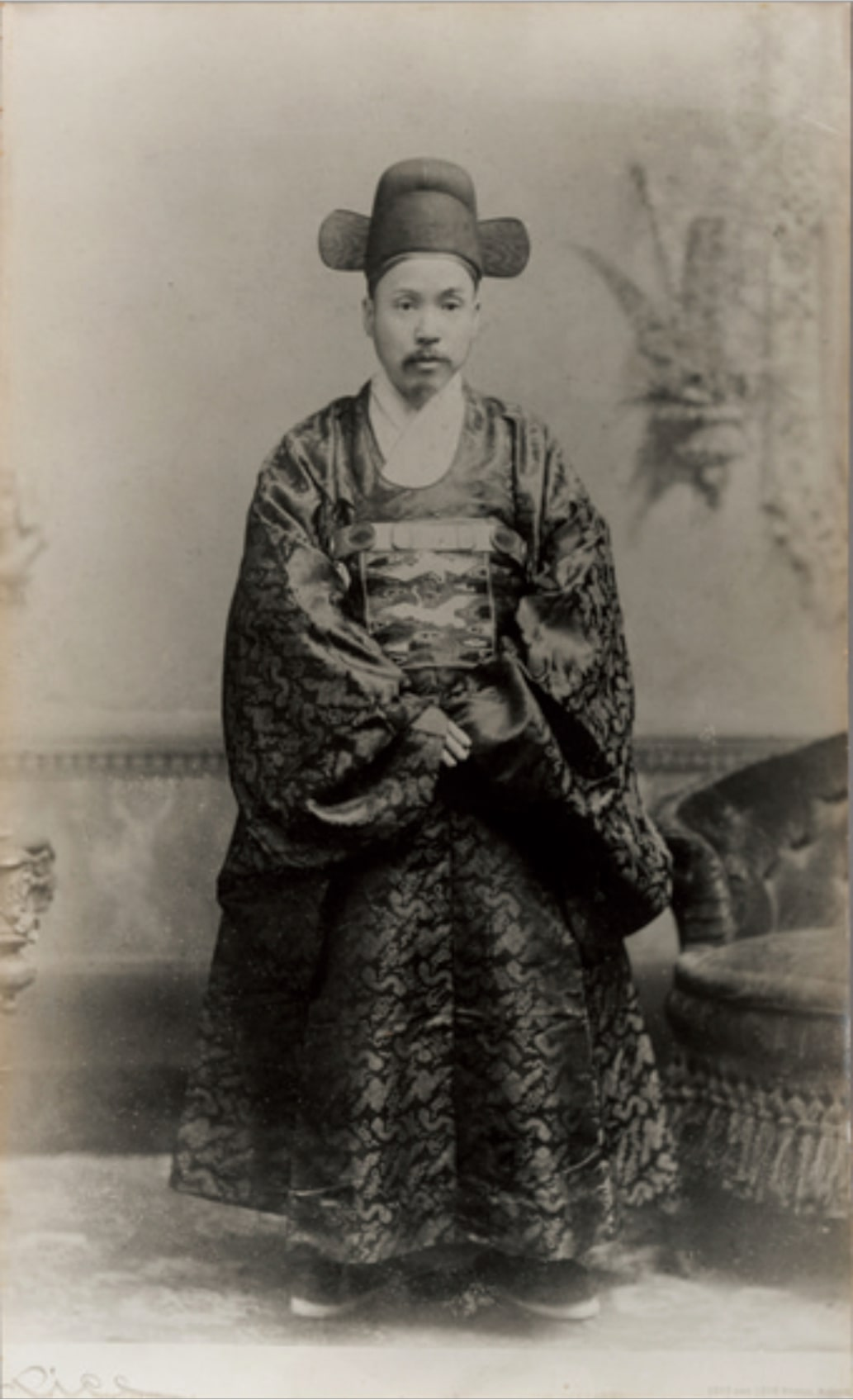
- Pak Jeongyang, around 1888's

Prime Minister of Joseon
- In office 31 May 1895 – 24 August 1895
- Monarch: Gojong
- Preceded by: Kim Hong-jip
- Succeeded by: Kim Hong-jip

Personal details
- Born: 4 February 1842 Joseon
- Died: 15 December 1905 (aged 63) Korean Empire
- Relations: Bannam Park clan

Korean name
- Hangul: 박정양
- Hanja: 朴定陽
- RR: Bak Jeongyang
- MR: Pak Chŏngyang

Art name
- Hangul: 죽천
- Hanja: 竹泉
- RR: Jukcheon
- MR: Chukch'ŏn

Courtesy name
- Hangul: 치중
- Hanja: 致中
- RR: Chijung
- MR: Ch'ijung

Posthumous name
- Hangul: 문익
- Hanja: 文翼
- RR: Munik
- MR: Munik

Pak Chŏngyang (Korean: 박정양; Hanja: 朴定陽; 4 February 1841 – 15 December 1905) was a Korean Joseon dynasty politician and edification activist, as well as a member of the Independence Club (독립협회; 獨立協會) and the People's Joint Association (만민공동회; 萬民共同會). He was a supporter of the slow modernization of Korea under the Joseon dynasty and himself belonged to the Bannam Park clan. He was also the father of famous Korean playwright Park Seung-hui. Pak Chŏngyang was appointed ambassador to the United States by the king in 1887. This diplomatic mission was strongly opposed by the Qing dynasty of China, which viewed Korea as a vassal state.Joseon was enjoying Westphalian sovereignty at the time of the diplomatic mission. After many years' conflict, Pak was punished and ostracized. The episode is considered representative of Korea's desire for complete independence colliding with the Qing desire to maintain traditional tributary ties, with Pak becoming a victim of this conflict. Pak was also the author of a few books.

== Family ==
- Father
  - Park Je-geun (박제근; 朴齊近; 1819–1885)
- Mother
  - Lady Yi
- Wives and their issue
  - Lady Jo of the Yangju Jo clan (양주 조씨; 楊州 趙氏; ? – January 1892); daughter of Jo Byeong-wi (조병위; 趙秉瑋)
    - Daughter - Lady Park of the Bannam Park clan (반남 박씨; 潘南 朴氏)
    - Daughter - Lady Park of the Bannam Park clan (반남 박씨; 潘南 朴氏)
    - Son - Park Seung-gil (박승길; 朴勝吉; 1871 – November 1891)
  - Lady Jang of the Indong Jang clan (인동 장씨; 仁同 張氏)
    - Son - Park Seung-cheol (박승철; 朴勝喆; 1897–?)
    - Son - Park Seung-hui (박승희; 朴勝喜; 17 August 1901 – 15 July 1964)

== See also ==
- Bak Yeonghyo
- Soh Jaipil
- Yun Chi-ho
- Syngman Rhee
