= Pak Chesun =

Korean politician (1858–1916)

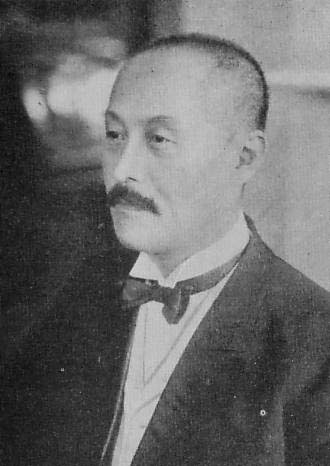
- Pak Chesun

Prime Minister of Korea
- In office 28 November 1905 – 1907
- Monarch: Gojong
- Preceded by: Han Kyu-seol
- Succeeded by: Lee Wan-yong
- In office 1909 – 11 August 1910
- Monarch: Sunjong
- Preceded by: Lee Wan-yong
- Succeeded by: Lee Wan-yong

Personal details
- Born: 7 December 1858 Yongin, Gyeonggi Province, Joseon
- Died: 20 June 1916 (aged 57) Keijō, Korea, Empire of Japan
- Occupation: Korean politician

Korean name
- Hangul: 박제순
- Hanja: 朴濟淳
- RR: Bak Jesun
- MR: Pak Chesun

Art name
- Hangul: 평재
- Hanja: 平齋
- RR: Pyeongjae
- MR: P'yŏngjae

Pak Chesun (Korean: 박제순; Hanja: 朴濟淳; 7 December 1858 – 20 June 1916) was a Korean politician and diplomat during the late Joseon period. His art name was P'yŏngjae (평재; 平齋). In modern South Korea, he is regarded as one of the Five Eulsa Traitors who betrayed the country into Japanese domination in 1905.

== Biography ==
Pak was born in Yongin, outside Seoul where his father was a minor government official and supporter of Kim Yunsik. His family's clan name is Bannam.

In 1883, after passing the Korean Imperial Examination, he was sent to Tianjin. On October 9, 1898, he was promoted to the post of Foreign Minister, and it was in this capacity that he signed the Japan–Korea Treaty of 1905 (also known as the "Eulsa Treaty"), which effectively deprived Korea of its diplomatic sovereignty and made it a protectorate of the Empire of Japan. On November 28, 1905 he became a Minister of State. Pak was the Prime Minister of the Korean Empire from 1905 to 1907 and again from 1909 to 1910.

From 1907 to 1910, Pak served as Minister of the Interior under Ye Wanyong. In this capacity, he signed the Japan–Korea Treaty of 1910, by which Korea was formally annexed by the Empire of Japan. Initially, all of the ministers were against signing the treaty. Pak even declared that he would rather commit suicide if Japan forced him to sign the treaty. However, under threat of execution, five of the ministers, including Pak, signed the treaty.

On October 16, 1910, Pak received the kazoku peerage title of Viscount (shishaku) from the Japanese government and a seat in the House of Peers of the Diet of Japan.

The treaty was very unpopular among the Korean public, leading to attacks on the ministers who signed it. The five ministers were named the "Five Eulsa Traitors". On December 6, 1910, one Korean Army soldier attempted to shoot Pak as he was entering the palace. Pak fled to the Japanese Legation, where he blamed Deputy Ambassador Hayashi Gonsuke for "making [him] a traitor to [his] own country". Pak then attempted to cut his own throat, but was stopped by Hayashi. Pak was subsequently sent to a hospital for treatment.

He later served on the Central Advisory Institute of the Government-General of Korea. Under the Special law to redeem pro-Japanese collaborators' property enacted in 2005, the property of the descendants of nine people who had collaborated when Korea was annexed by Japan was confiscated by the South Korean government.

== Honours ==
Korean Empire

- Order of the Taegeuk 3rd Class on 22 April 1900

Kingdom of Belgium

- Royal Order of the Lion 3rd Class on 26 October 1901

== See also ==
- Special law to redeem pro-Japanese collaborators' property
- List of prime ministers of Korea
- Lee Wan-yong
