= Han Kyusŏl =

Imperial Korean Prime Minister (1848–1930)

Han Gyu-seol
- 한규설
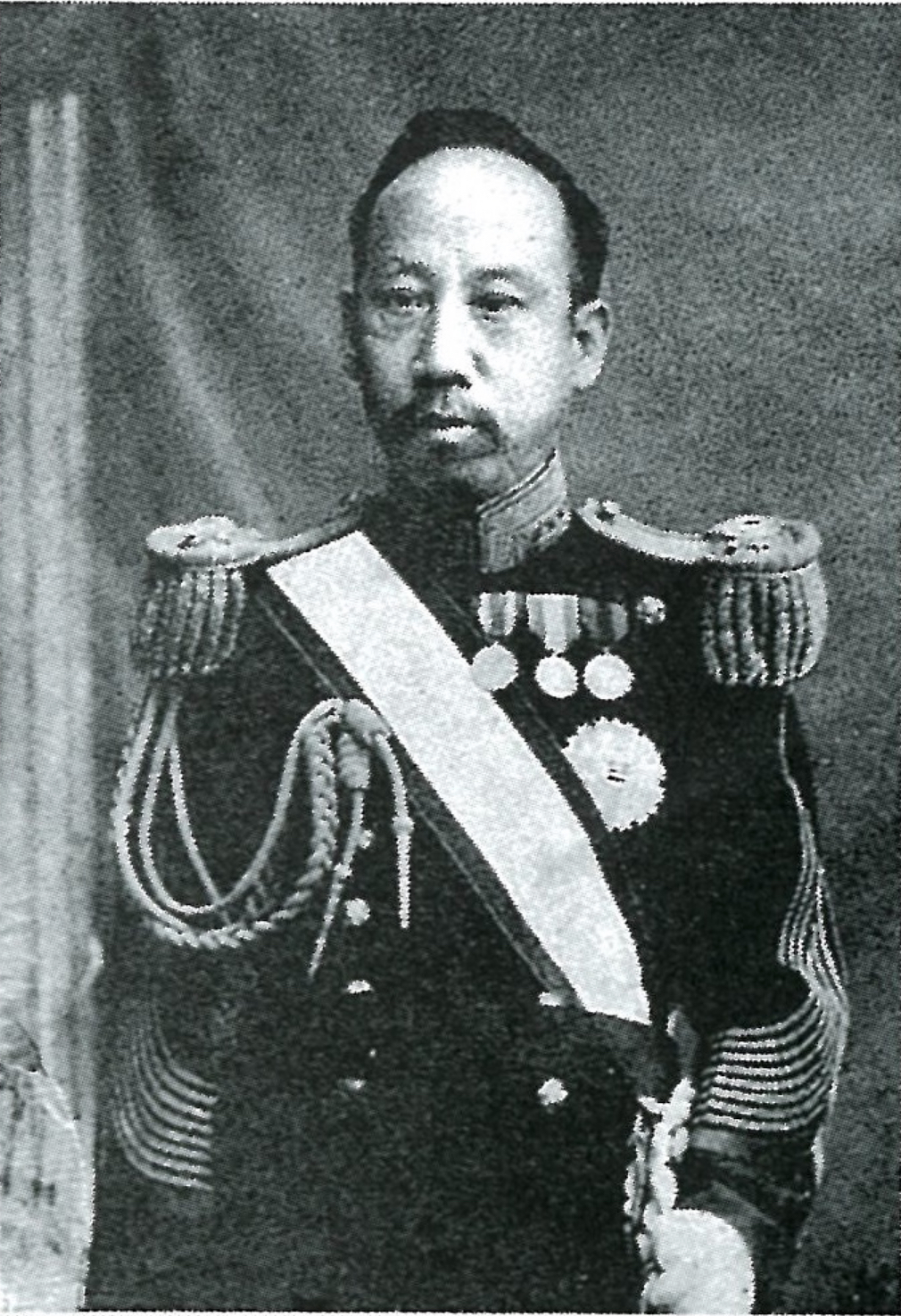

Prime Minister of Korean Empire
- In office 27 August 1905 – 17 November 1905
- Monarch: Gojong
- Preceded by: Cho Byeong-ho
- Succeeded by: Min Yeong-cheol

Personal details
- Born: 29 February 1848 Hanseong, Joseon
- Died: 22 September 1930 (aged 82) Cheongju, Chūseihoku-dō, Korea, Empire of Japan
- Resting place: Goyang, Gyeonggi Province
- Party: Independence Club
- Other political affiliations: Independent politician

Military service
- Years of service: 1905–1907
- Rank: Lieutenant General

Han Kyusŏl (Korean: 한규설; Hanja: 韓圭卨; 29 February 1848 – 22 September 1930) was a prime minister of Korean Empire when the Japan–Korea Treaty of 1905 was signed. Han opposed the treaty, but failed to prevent it from being signed.

== Biography ==
Han was born on 29 February 1848 in Seoul. In his youth, Han passed the Gwageo's military examination, and was appointed as the commander of army of the in Gyeongsang-right province. After serving at various posts, Han was appointed as Mayor of Seoul in 1887. Later in 1896, he was promoted to Minister of Law.

When the Independence Club was formed, Han demonstrated favor for the liberal political party; he was appointed as the Speaker of the National Assembly when the People's Joint Association was at its peak. To soothe the disgruntled public after arresting 17 leaders of the Independence club, Emperor Gojong appointed Han as the chief judge of the court. Han delivered the arrested leaders light punishments. However, as the Imperial government disbanded the Independence Club, Han was subsequently ousted from his position.

After the proclamation of the Korean Empire, Han served within various political posts. On 15 February 1902, Han was appointed as Minister of Law. On 27 August 1905, Han was appointed as the prime minister, and Lieutenant General of the army on 8 November 1905. As the prime minister of Korea, Han was firmly opposed the Eulsa Treaty. Initially all of the ministers were against signing the treaty. Pak Chesoon, who was the Minister of Foreign Affairs, declared that he would rather commit suicide if Japan forced him to sign the treaty. However, when Han was locked in a closet at Jungmyeongjeon by Japanese troops and under threat of execution, the remaining ministers fearing similar treatment, signed the treaty. Ye Wanyong, Yi Ji-yong, and Gwon Jung-hyeon were the first to change their stance. After the Eulsa treaty was signed, Han made several attempts to annul the treaty but lacked the political power to do so, as he was previously dismissed from the position as prime minister. After the treaty of 1905 was signed, Han, as well as Five Eulsa Traitors, were the target of public resentment. Choe Ik-hyeon wrote that Han was at great fault for the ratification of the treaty.

After the annexation of Korea, the Japanese Government awarded Han the title of Baron but he refused. In 1920, Han established the Joseon Education Organization with Yi Sang-jae, which was later transformed into the Millip Deahak Giseonghoe. He died on 22 September 1930 in Cheongju.

On 17 March 1977, Han's house became officially recognized a cultural property within Seoul.

== Family ==
- Father
  - Han Sŭngnyŏl (한승렬; 韓承烈)
- Sibling(s)
  - Older brother - Han Kyujik (한규직; 韓圭稷)
  - Younger brother - Han Jinho (한진호)
- Wife (name unknown)
- Issue
  - Son - Han Yangho (한양호; 韓亮鎬)
  - Daughter - Lady Han of the Cheongju Han clan (청주 한씨; 淸州 韓氏)
  - Daughter - Lady Han of the Cheongju Han clan (청주 한씨; 淸州 韓氏)
  - Daughter - Lady Han of the Cheongju Han clan (청주 한씨; 淸州 韓氏)

== Honours ==
Korean Empire

- Order of the Palgwae 1st Class

== Notes ==
Political offices
Preceded by Cho Byeong-ho	Prime Minister of the Korean Empire; 28 August 1905 – 17 November 1905	Succeeded by Min Young-cheol
