= Korean Empire =

Empire in East Asia (1897–1910)

Coordinates: 37°32′N 126°59′E

Empire of Korea 대한국 大韓國
- 1897–1910
- Flag Imperial emblem
- Motto: 광명천지 光明天地 "Illuminate Heaven and Earth"
- Anthem: 대한제국 애국가 大韓帝國愛國歌 "Patriotic Hymn of the Great Korean Empire" (1902–1910)
- National seal: 大韓國璽 Emblem

- Territory of the Korean Empire 1903–1905. The disputed Gando and Samjiyon regions are shaded in lighter green.
- Status: Sovereign state (1897–1905); Protectorate of Japan (1905–1910)
- Capital: Hanseong (present-day Seoul)
- Common languages: Korean
- Religion: Confucianism; Buddhism; Shamanism; Taoism; Christianity; Cheondoism (recognized in 1907)
- Demonym: Korean
- Government: Unitary absolute monarchy (de jure) Unitary constitutional monarchy (de facto)
- Emperor
  - 1897–1907: Gojong
  - 1907–1910: Sunjong
- Resident-General
  - 1905–1909: Itō Hirobumi
  - 1909–1910: Sone Arasuke
  - 1910: Terauchi Masatake
- Prime Minister (Note: Style: Naegak chongri daesin (1894–1896); Ui jeong (1896–1905); Ui jeong daesin (1905–1907); Chongri daesin (1907–1910))
  - 1894–1895 (first): Kim Hong-jip
  - 1907–1910 (last): Yi Wan-yong
- Legislature: Jungchuwon (until 1907); None (rule by decree) (from 1907)
- Historical era: New Imperialism
  - Empire proclaimed: 13 October 1897
  - Constitution adopted: 17 August 1899
  - Eulsa Treaty: 17 November 1905
  - Hague Secret Emissary Affair: 15 June 1907
  - Abdication of Emperor Gojong: 19 July 1907
  - Annexation by the Japanese Empire: 29 August 1910

Population
  - 1900: 17,082,000
- Currency: Yang (1897–1902); Won (1902–1910)
Preceded by	Succeeded by
Joseon	Chōsen
- Today part of: North Korea; South Korea; China (disputed); Russia (disputed)

Korean name
- Hangul: 대한국
- Hanja: 大韓國
- RR: Daehanguk
- MR: Taehan'guk
- IPA: [tɛ.ɦan.ɡuk̚]

Common name
- Hangul: 대한제국
- Hanja: 大韓帝國
- RR: Daehan jeguk
- MR: Taehan cheguk

Alternative North Korean name
- Hangul: 조선실락황조
- Hanja: 朝鮮失落皇朝
- RR: Joseon sillak hwangjo
- MR: Chosŏn sillak hwangjo

The Korean Empire (Korean: 대한국; Hanja: 大韓國; lit. 'Great Korean State'), officially the Empire of Korea and commonly called Daehan Jeguk (Korean: 대한제국; Hanja: 大韓帝國; lit. 'Empire of Great Korea') in Korean, was a Korean monarchical state proclaimed in October 1897 by King Gojong of the Joseon Dynasty. The empire lasted until the Japanese annexation of Korea in August 1910.

During this period, Emperor Gojong oversaw the Gwangmu Reform, a partial modernization and westernization of Korea's military, economy, land system, education system, and various industries. In 1905, the Korean Empire became a protectorate of the Empire of Japan. After the Japanese annexation in 1910, the Korean Empire ceased to exist.

== History ==
=== Formation ===
Resistance against Korea having a tributary relationship with China increased in the 17th century. As the Ming dynasty was replaced by Qing dynasty, Western ideas entering Korea had caused anti-tributary sentiments to rise in Korea. Moreover, after the opening of Korea, members of the Gaehwa Party often declared independence from China, but China increased its interference in Korean affairs after the Imo Incident and Kapsin Coup.

However, following the Japanese victory in the First Sino-Japanese War, Joseon won independence from the Qing dynasty. Proclaiming an empire was seen by many politicians as a good way to maintain independence. After Gojong of Korea returned from his exile in the Russian legation, many officials requested Gojong to proclaim an empire to strengthen the country, and build a firm framework as an independent state. Moreover, Gojong realized that Korea needed a new constitution to gain public support, and an opportunity to start drastic reforms. He established Gyo Junso (Korean: 교전소; Hanja: 校典所) to manage the reformed constitution. The Gyo Junso included all factions of Koreans, which impeded it from making notable achievements. The main conflict between the members was about the authority of the king. The Gyo Junso was dissolved in 1899, without having achieved success.

In October 1897, Gojong was crowned in Hwangudan. The coronation included both Western style coronation and a traditional Asian one. Gojong named the new empire Daehan and changed the regnal year to Gwangmu, with 1897 being the first year of Gwangmu. Gojong implemented the constitution of the country in 1898, which gave the whole authority to the emperor.

At first, most nations did not accept the proclamation of the empire. The negative foreign response to the new empire was due to the independence of Korea from foreign influence, which had dominated its political and economic landscape. Among foreign nations, Qing showed their opposition most explicitly. They regarded the formation of the Korean Empire as a more embarrassing event than the loss of the First Sino-Japanese War. Eventually foreign monarchs acknowledged Gojong as an emperor.

=== Reforms ===
==== Rise of civil rights and the Independence Club ====
Even though all authority resided with the emperor, popular influence in politics increased from the Joseon era. Many newspapers such as Tongnip sinmun were established, promoting political awareness. Many organizations were established, including the Independence Club. Moreover, protests were not banned and people protested for reforms in Seoul. The Independence Club tried to bring many reforms to the country to improve civil rights. The club established the Junchuwon, which was a westernized senate of the Korean Empire. In October 1898, the Independence Club made six requests to the emperor:

1. Neither officials nor people shall depend upon foreign aid, but shall do their best to strengthen and uphold the imperial power.
2. All documents pertaining to foreign loans, the hiring of foreign soldiers, the granting of concessions, etc., in fact every document drawn up between the Korean government and a foreign party or firm, shall be signed and sealed by all the Ministers of State and the President of the Privy Council.
3. Important offenders shall be punished only after they have been given a public trial and ample opportunity to defend themselves.
4. To his Majesty shall belong the power to appoint Ministers, but in case a majority of the Cabinet disapproves of the Emperor's nominee he shall not be appointed.
5. All sources of revenue and methods of raising taxes shall be placed under the control of the Finance Department, no other department, officer or corporation being allowed to interfere therewith; and the annual estimates and balances shall be made public.
6. The existing laws and regulations shall be enforced without fear or favour.

However, the Sugu Party, which was in opposition to the Independence Party, spread false rumors that the club was attempting to depose the Emperor, establish a republic, and make Bak Jeongyang President with Yun Chi-ho as Vice President. Upon hearing this rumor, Gojong ordered the immediate apprehension of members of the Independence Club. Among the 20 leaders of the club, 17 were arrested. Members of the Sugu Party wanted to execute these leaders, but the exile of President Yun Chi-ho led the party to focus on arresting Yun. On November 5, 1898, Gojong banned the club through an imperial decree. Moreover, he replaced ministers who had signed the six requests of the Independence Club. The new cabinet was formed with many politicians who were more conservative compared to the members of the Independence Club.

Another part of reform under Korean Empire was military reform. Both conservatives and the progressives agreed with strengthening military. However, they faced obstacles as the Kabo Reform seriously weakened Korean armed forces.

=== 1898–1904 ===
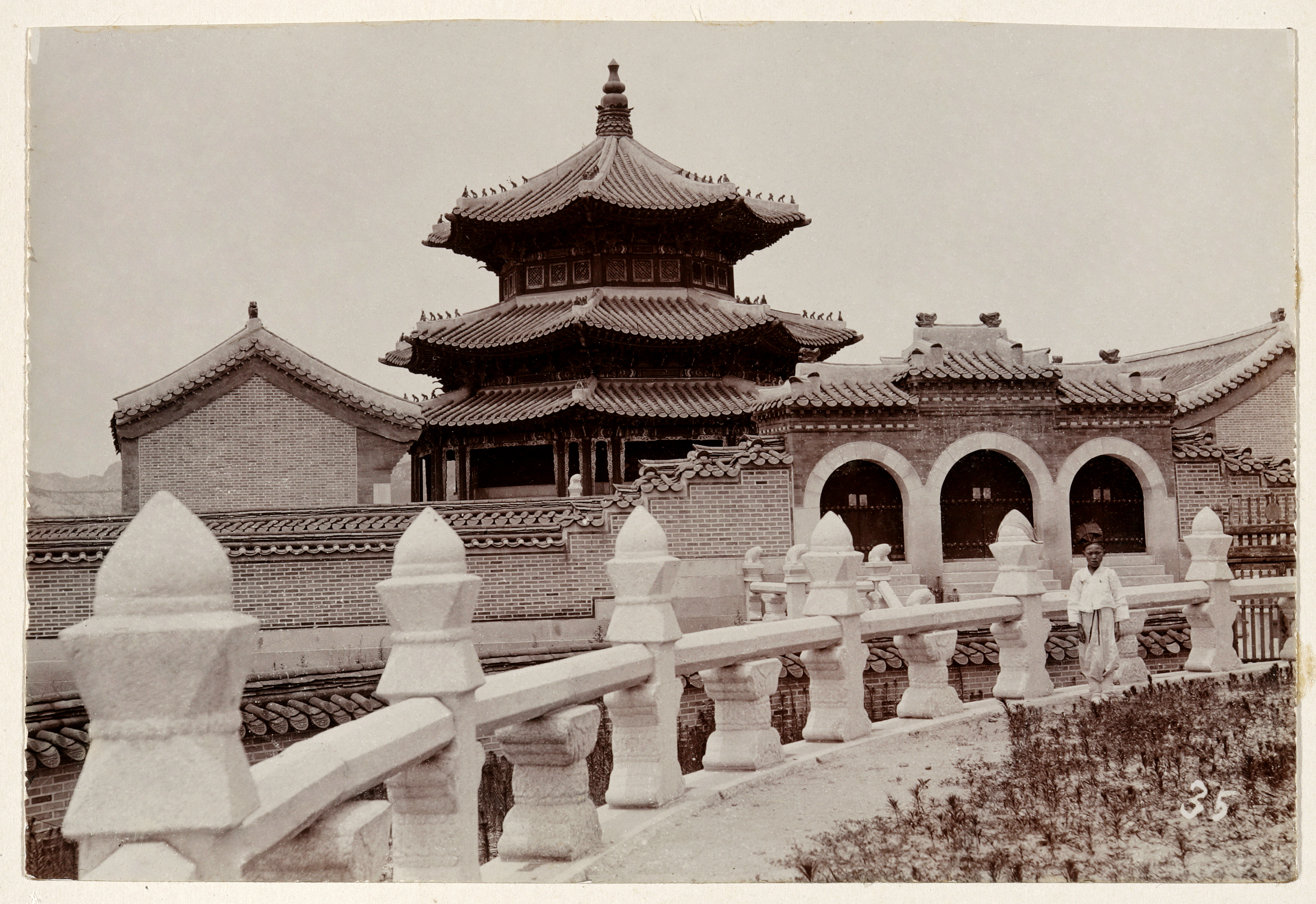
Hwangudan in 1906

Right after dissolving the Independence Club and People's Joint Association by force, Gojong sought to design his new cabinet with conservative politicians. Liberal officials, such as Min Young-hwan, Han Kyu-seol, Yi Hak-gyun, and Yi Jong-geon, received their dismissal, while conservative counterparts experienced rise to the power: Shim Sang-hun as the Uijeongbu Chanjung, Yu Gi-hwan as the Minister, Min Young-gi as the Minister of Economy, Shin Gi-sun as the Minister of Education, Min Byeong-seok as the Minister of Military, and Yi Gi-dong as the 1st Siwi Regiment 1st Battalion commander. Furthermore, many Bobusangs were integrated into the officialdom, that 46 Bobusangs received position in the officialdom; this rise of Bobusangs was a torment for commoners who suffered from their tyranny as local officials.

Even though the Independence Club was banned, reforms were not stopped and the Gwangmu Reform continued. Conservative or left of center Politicians such as Min Young-hwan, Han Kyu-seol, Yi Yong-ik, Shim Soon-taek, Yun Ung-nyeol, and Shim Sang-hun led the reforms. Among these ministers, Yun Ung-nyeol. Yi Yong-ik and Shim Sang-hun were hated by the former members of the Independence Club. These officials tried to reform the country conservatively. The new cabinet formed with conservative politicians wanted to strengthen the power of the emperor. This required more taxes from the citizens. As a result, many minor taxes that were abolished by Kabo Reform were revived. These increased taxes enabled the Imperial Government to be rich enough to perform reform.

The new cabinet also emphasized the independence of the country, leading to the enlargement of the Imperial Korean Army. Colonel Dmitry Putyata and some officers were sent from Russia to Korea. However, Putyata had conflicts with Min Young-hwan, who was the former ambassador to Russia. He returned to Russia on 26 November 1897 after assisting in the modernizing of the army. In 1898, 10 more battalions were formed. By sending troops, the empire tried to protect its people. Jinwidae forces were deployed in Jiandao, where many Koreans lived. The new cabinet also wanted to establish a modern navy by buying ships with KIS Yangmu being the first ship to be bought, for only 451,605 won.

The government tried to industrialize the country by sending many students abroad to learn modern skills. Many new technologies were brought in to Korea and many companies were established. Formalizing land ownership records also enabled better land tax collection. These reforms were able to bring changes to the Korean Empire that made the country richer and stronger.

Moreover, land system reforms were initiated to establish a proper land ownership. Under the leadership of Minister of Interior Bak Jeongyang, and Minister of Agriculture and Industry Yi Tojae, land system reforms were purposed in June 1898. The new system not only included the land or house itself but also the surroundings of the land. As only 4 out of 10 ministers agreed with the proposal, it did not pass. However, when Gojong reviewed this cabinet conference, he ordered the reform proposal to proceed regardless.

==== Foreign affairs ====
One of the key problems of the Korean Empire was its foreign affairs. Despite its official neutrality, the country had many policies that favored the Russian Empire. Russia frequently intervened in Korea and many of Korea's natural resources were sent to Russia.

Historians are still unsure what Russia's true intentions were towards Korea at the time. According to a dispatch sent from Shanghai, Russia tried to make the Korean Empire a protectorate of the Russian Empire. But Tsar Nicholas II himself did not desire colonizing Korea. In 1901, Nicholas told Prince Henry of Prussia, "I do not want to seize Korea but under no circumstances can I allow Japan to become firmly established there. That would be a casus belli."

=== Taft-Katsura Agreement and the Russo-Japanese War ===
Before the Russo-Japanese War, Korea tried to show its neutrality to different Western countries. On 27 January 1904, Russia, France, Germany, and the United Kingdom formally commended Korea's declaration of neutrality.

Later that year on August 22, the first treaty between Japan and Korea, known as the First Japan–Korea Convention, was signed. This allowed the creation of a Japanese garrison in Korea, the Japanese Korean Army. The Taft–Katsura Agreement (more appropriately known as the Taft–Katsura Memorandum) was issued on July 17, 1905. It was not actually a secret pact or agreement between the United States and Japan, but rather a set of notes regarding discussions on U.S.-Japanese relations between members of the governments of both countries, hence its more appropriate name memorandum. The Japanese Prime Minister Taro Katsura used the opportunity presented by Secretary of War William Howard Taft's stopover in Tokyo to extract a statement from Taft on the Korean question, in his capacity as a representative of the Roosevelt Administration. Taft expressed in the memorandum that a suzerain relationship with Japan guiding Korea would "contribute to permanent peace in the Far East."

In September 1905, Russia and Japan signed the Treaty of Portsmouth, ending the Russo-Japanese War and firmly establishing Japan's influence in Korea. Secret diplomatic contacts were sent by the Gwangmu Emperor in the fall of 1905 to entities outside of Korea presenting Korea's desperate case to preserve their sovereignty, as normal diplomatic channels were no longer an option, due to the constant surveillance by the Japanese.

=== Eulsa Treaty ===
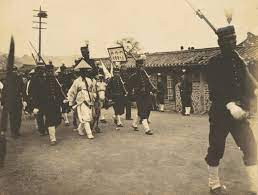
State funeral of Min Young-hwan who committed suicide in protest of the Eulsa Treaty

Until 1905, the Korean Empire was advancing due to reforms. However, things changed after the Eulsa Treaty. Through numerous treaties, Japan isolated Korea. Emperor Gojong was opposed to the Eulsa Treaty, but negotiations proceeded without him. There were eight ministers in the conference room. Prime Minister Han Kyu-seol, Minister of the Army Yi Geun-taek, Minister of the Interior Yi Ji-yong, Minister of Foreign Affairs Park Je-sun, Minister of Agriculture, Commerce, and Industry Gwon Jung-hyeon, Minister of Finance Min Yeong-gi, and Minister of Justice Yi Ha-yeong were the Korean ministers in the conference room. Except for Han Kyu-seol, Min Yeoung-gi, and Yi Ha-yeong, all the ministers agreed with the treaty, which established a Japanese protectorate over Korea. After the treaty was signed, the Waebu, which was the ministry of foreign affairs, was dissolved. All of Korea's foreign affairs were now handled by Tokyo. Many embassies were recalled from Korea due to the treaty. On February 1, 1906, Itō Hirobumi, who led the Japanese treaty negotiations, became the first Japanese Resident-General of Korea.

=== Korean resistance ===
In order to manifest the invalidity of the Eulsa Treaty, Gojong sent several secret embassies to plea for support. Korean secret diplomacy's first target was Russia. Koreans believed that Russia would help the Korean independence as several Koreans who fled to Shanghai after Japan–Korea Treaty of February 1904, such as Yi Hak-gyun, had sent letters from former Russian minister to Korea Pavlov, which said that Japan would be withdrawn by Russian forces, and Russia would ensure Korean independence.

Another response to Eulsa Treaty was committing suicide. Yi Han-eung and Min Young-hwan are examples for such resistance. Many joined the righteous armies and some even attempted to assassinate the five Korean ministers who consented to the treaty also known as the Five Eulsa Traitors.

Often the Gojong of Korea himself led the resistance. He sent many messages to European monarchs such as Wilhelm II, George V, or Nicholas II. He sent Homer Hulbert, an American missionary and journalist, to the United States as an emissary in order to repudiate the treaty. In June 1906, Nicholas II secretly sent Gojong an invitation for the Hague Convention of 1907. He sent emissaries to the Hague in order to repudiate the Eulsa Treaty. However, the emissaries were not accorded recognition. The houses of Ye Wanyong were burned by the people and the Japanese Korean Army intervened to suppress public discontent. These acts against the terms of the treaty led to the abdication of Gojong, who was succeeded by Sunjong on 19 July 1907.

=== Japanese protectorate and annexation ===
After Sunjong became emperor, the Japan–Korea Treaty of 1907 was signed. Under the treaty, more Japanese were employed in the Korean government and started to intervene closely in Korean affairs. Forces of General Hasegawa garrisoned the palace. Some regiments of the Imperial Korean Army were disarmed. The Pyongyang Jinwidae, which was the elite unit of the Imperial Korean Army, was disarmed. Starting this reduction of Jinwidae, many regiments of the Imperial Korean Army were dissolved starting from 31 July 1907. These Japanese interventions fueled the righteous armies and various local peasant militias to fight against the Japanese, but with little success. From 1909, the Japanese suppressed all of the righteous armies. Many of their members fled to Manchuria or other parts of China to join the Independence Army.

Japanese officials were implanted into the Korean officialdom. According to the Japan-Korea Treaty of 1907, Japanese who served as advisors for Korea were incorporated to the Korean central government. By 31 December 1908, 40.7 percent of all officials and 36.9 percent of high-ranking officials were Japanese, with the result of many Korean officials losing their jobs.

Under Terauchi Masatake, Japan prepared to annex Korea. After the Japan–Korea Treaty of 1910 was signed on 22 August 1910, the Korean Empire was annexed. The annexation was announced on 29 August 1910.

== Military ==
The Imperial Armed Forces (대한제국군; 大韓帝國軍) was the military of the Korean Empire.

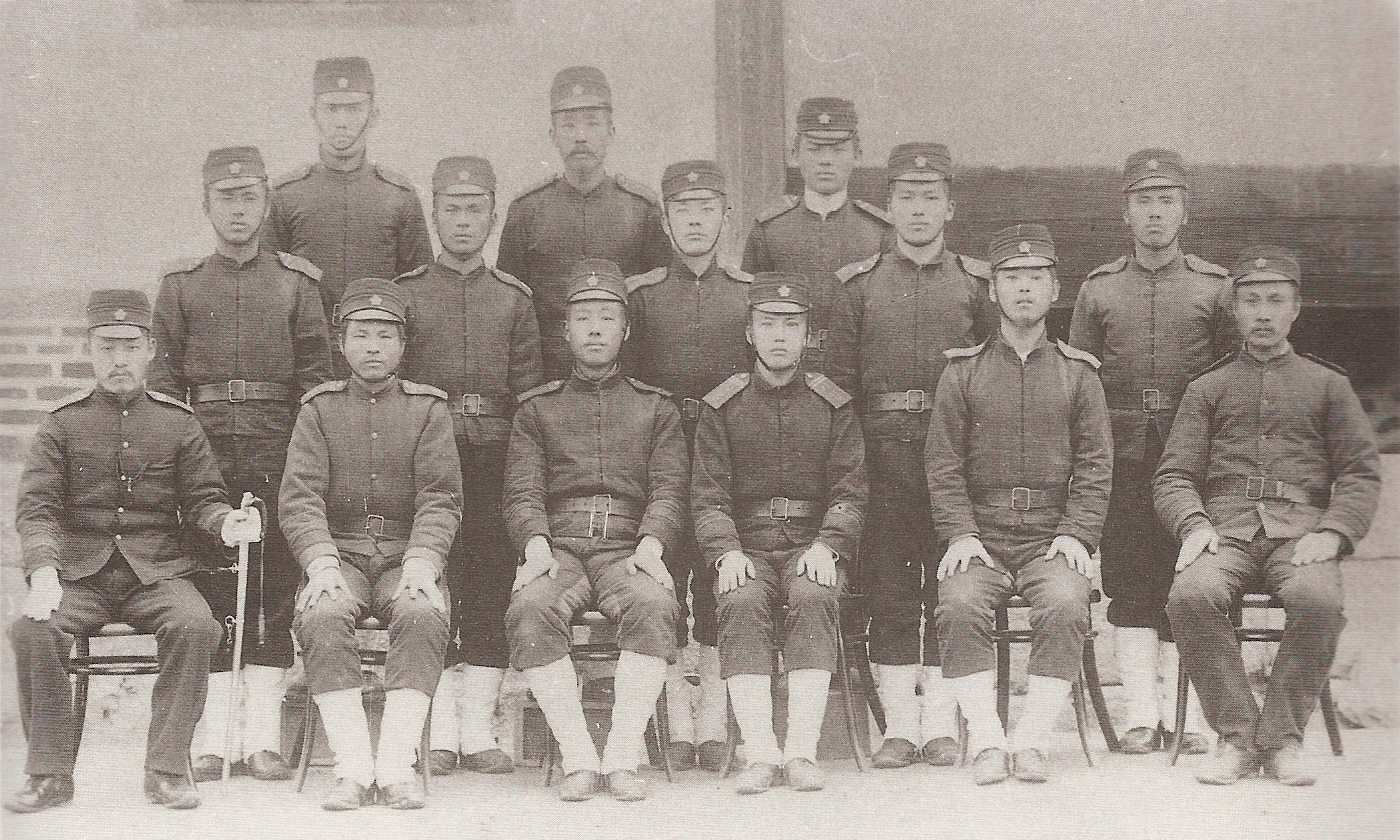
Soldiers of the Korean Imperial Army, 1898

=== Composition ===
The Imperial Armed Forces comprised the Imperial Korean Army and the Imperial Korean Navy. With the central and provincial armies, the Korean Imperial grew immensely to 28,000 before 1907.

=== Organization ===
Succeeding the former Joseon Army and Navy, the Gwangmu Reform reorganized the military into a modern, Western-style one. Unlike in the Joseon dynasty, service was voluntary. It had a size of about 30,000, including soldiers and cadets.

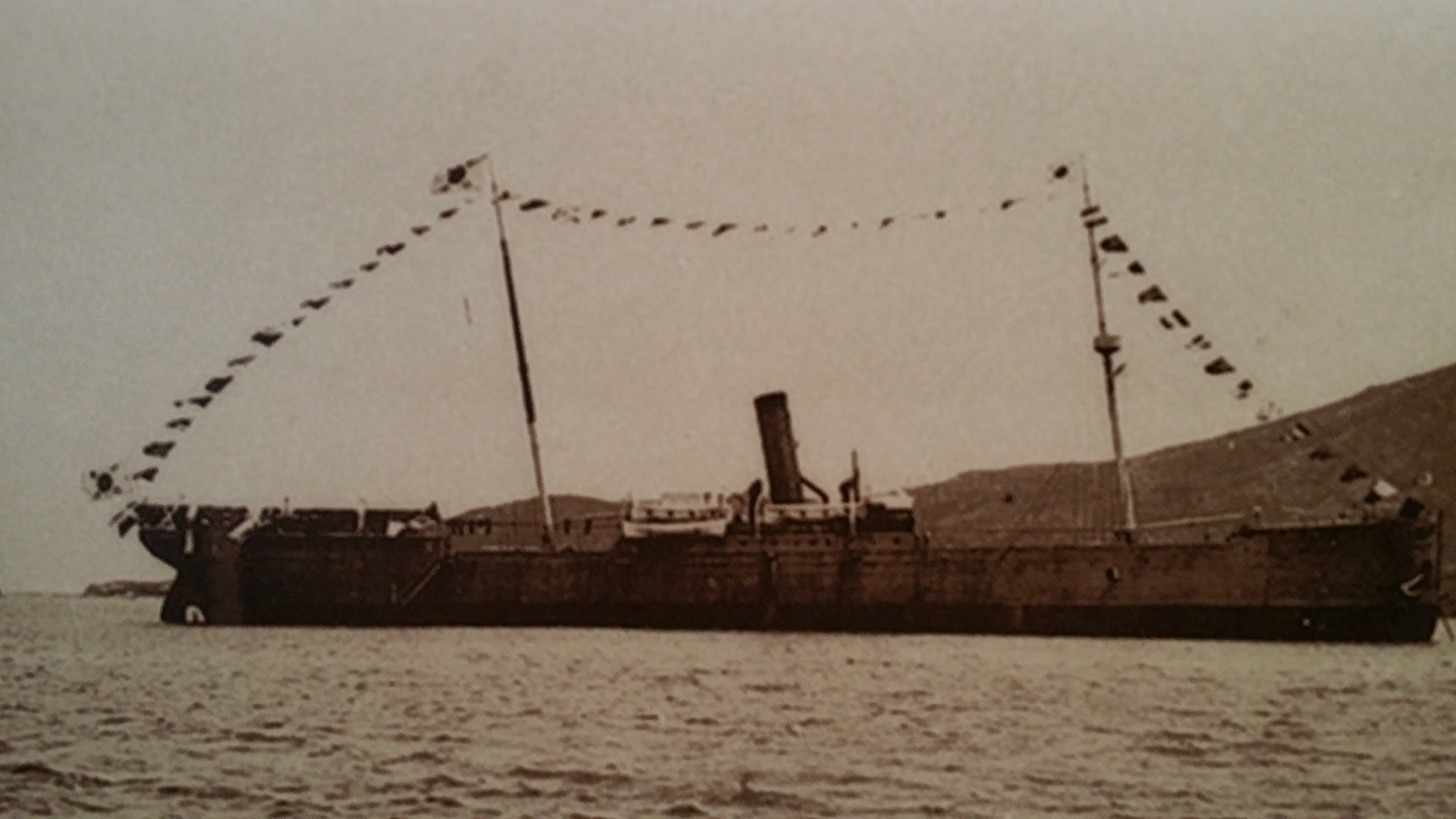
KIS Yangmu, the first naval ship of the Imperial Korean Navy

=== Dissolution ===
The military disbanded on August 1, 1907, due to the Japan-Korea Treaty of 1907. Major Park Seung-hwan protested by committing suicide, sparking a revolt led by former imperial soldiers leading to the battle at Namdaemun Gate. Emperor Sunjong incorporated the remaining soldiers into the Imperial Guards until 1910, while others formed the foundations of the Righteous armies.

== Economy ==
Some modern enterprises emerged in the Korean Empire, including some hand-operated machinery. These enterprises faced a crisis when Japanese products were imported into the country and the enterprises lacked capital intensity. Although limited banking infrastructure existed, it was not able to adequately support economic development. Large Korean (South Korean) companies existing to this day such as Doosan and Korea Electric Power Corporation originated during the Imperial period.

Nonetheless, the Korean Empire was able to have good economic growth. The GDP per capita of the Korean Empire was $850 in 1900, which was 26th highest in the world and 2nd highest in Asia.

The economic progress of the Korean Empire was reflected in a secret report that Hayashi Gonsuke sent to Aoki Shūzō, indicating that the Korean Empire was becoming an economic participant on the global stage.

Era of Korean Empire was a period when modern companies were established. At the dawn of the Korean Empire, officials from Gaehwa Party such as Ahn Gyeong-su, Yun Chi-ho, and Yi Chae-yeon led the establishments of companies. However, as the absolute government of Gojong was established, those who were close to the Emperor including Yi Yong-ik, Min Young-hwan, and Yi Yun-yong were highly interested in the establishments of companies.

Tax revenue of the Korean Empire during 1895–1905:

Year	1895	1896	1897	1898	1899	1900	1901	1902	1903	1904	1905
Amount of tax revenue in Won	4,557,587	4,809,410	4,191,192	4,527,476	6,473,222	6,162,796	9,079,456	7,586,530	10,766,115	14,214,573	14,960,574

Annual expenditure of the Korean Empire during 1895–1905:

Year	1895	1896	1897	1898	1899	1900	1901	1902	1903	1904	1905
Amount of annual expenditure in Won	3,244,910	5,144,531	3,967,647	4,419,432	6,128,229	5,558,972	8,020,151	6,932,037	9,697,371	12,370,795	12,947,624

== Diplomatic relationships ==
- Japan: 1876–1910
- United States: 1882–1905
- Germany: 1883–1905
- United Kingdom: 1883–1905
- Russia: 1884–1905
- Italy: 1884–1905
- France: 1886–1905
- Austria-Hungary: 1892–1905
- China: 1899–1905
- Belgium: 1901–1905
- Denmark: 1902–1905

== Gallery ==
Emblem

Coat of arms

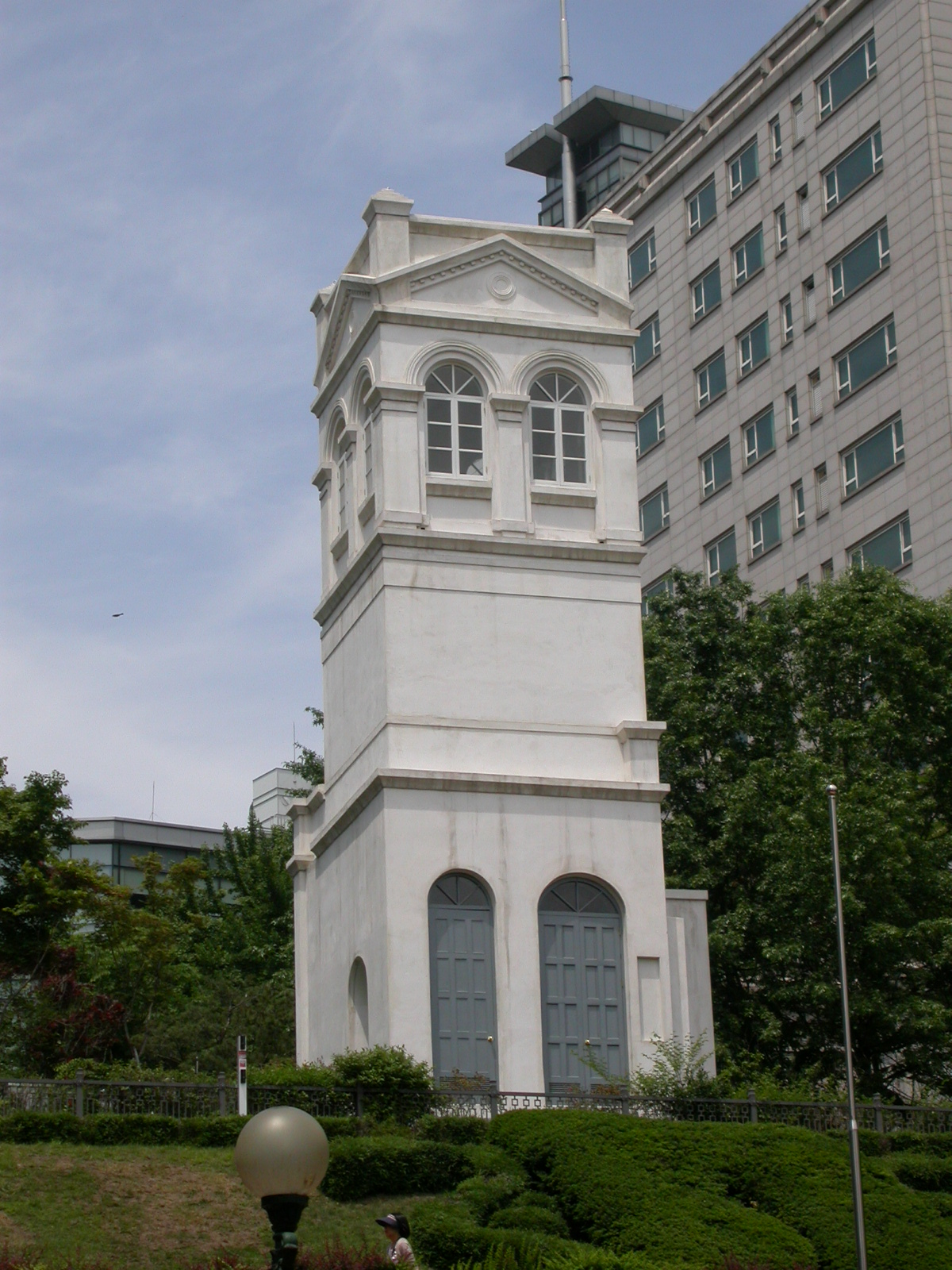
Part of the old Russian legation building in Seoul. In 1896, King Gojong and the crown prince fled from the Gyeongbok Palace to the Russian legation in Seoul.

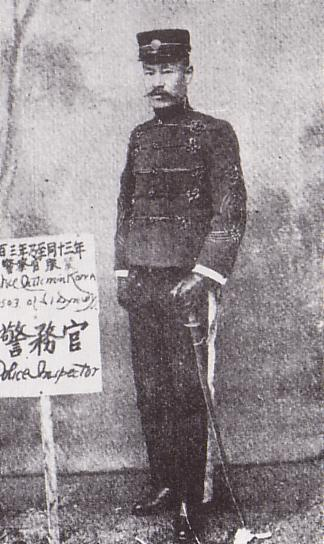
In 1900, Western attire became the official uniform for Korean civil officials. Several years later, all Korean policemen were ordered to wear modernized uniforms.

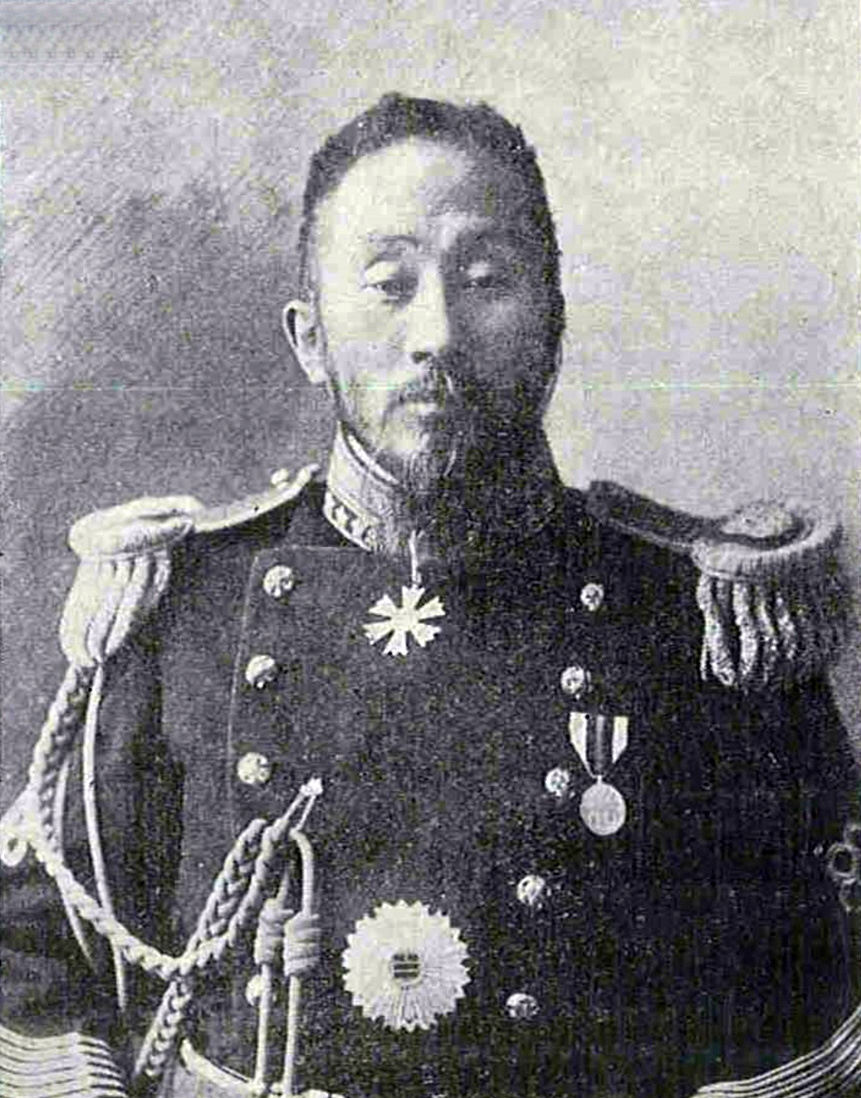
Yi Yong-ik, Chief of the Bureau of Currency during the Korean Empire

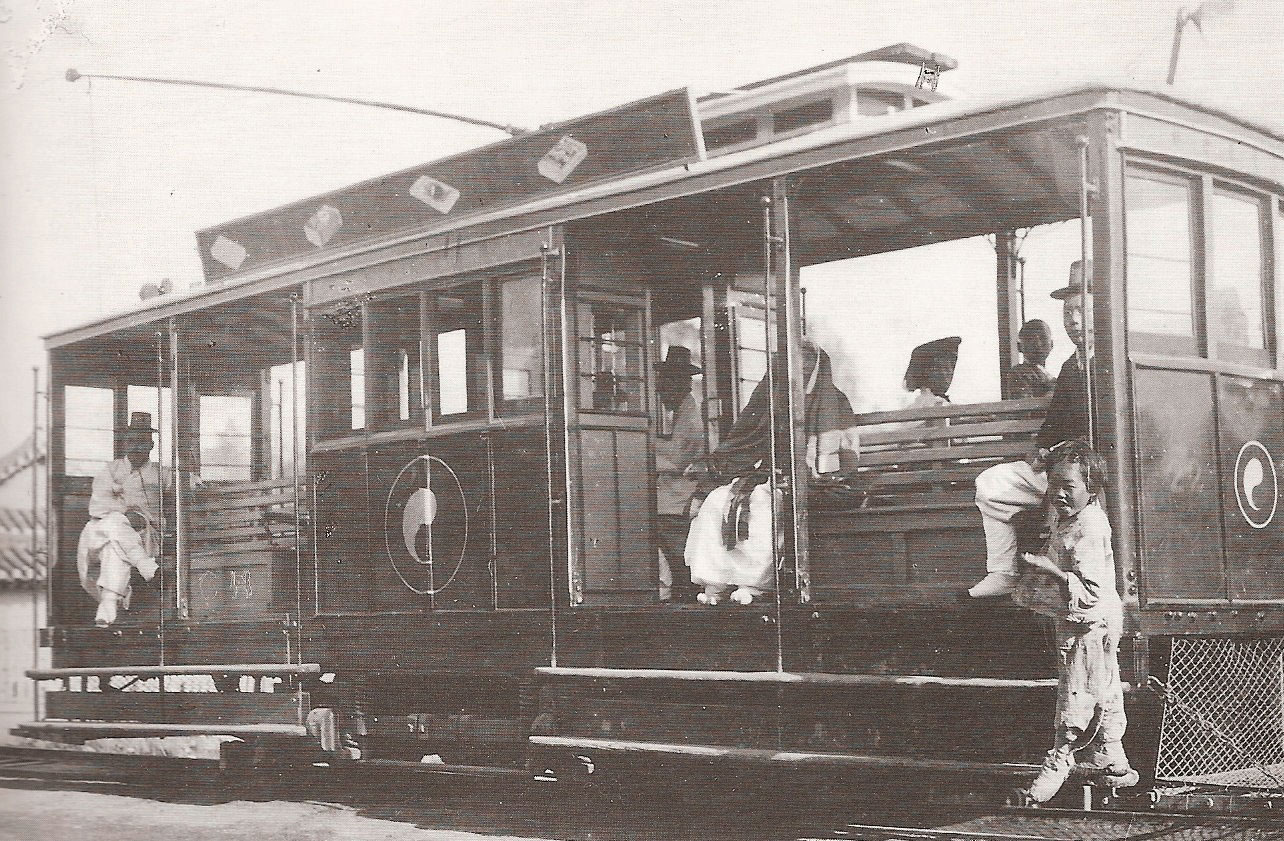
A streetcar in Seoul, 1903

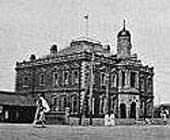
The headquarters of the Hanseong Electric Company

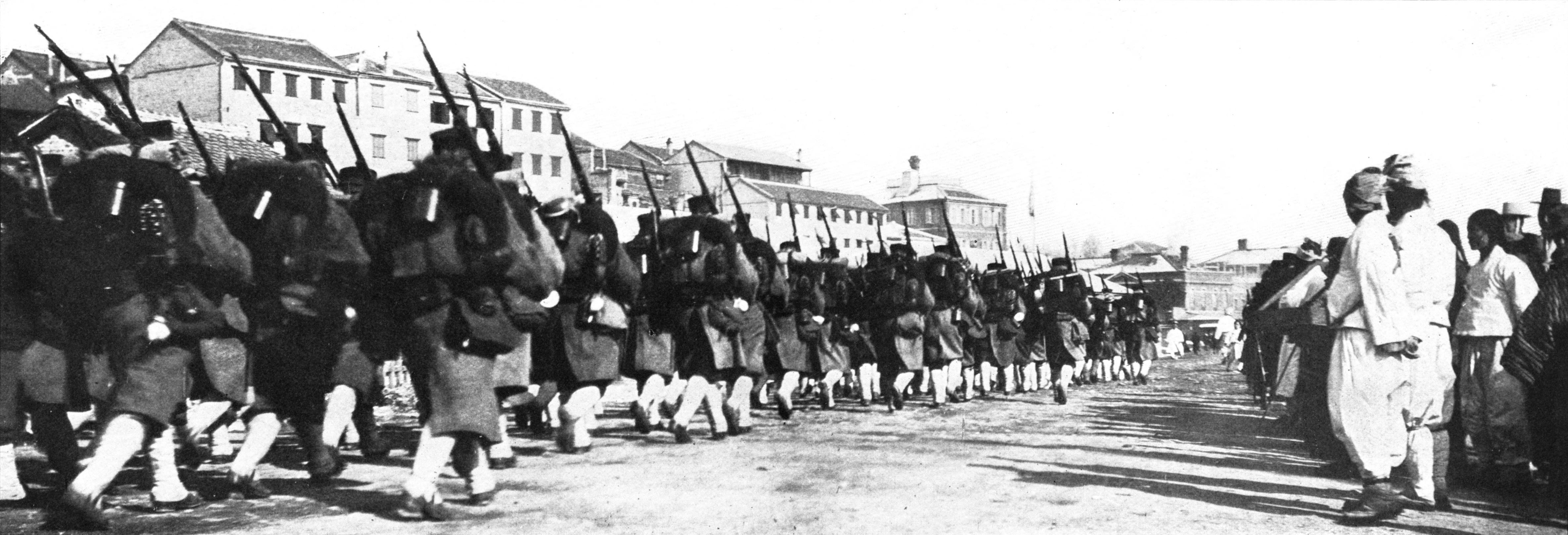
Japanese infantry marching through Seoul during the Russo-Japanese War in 1904

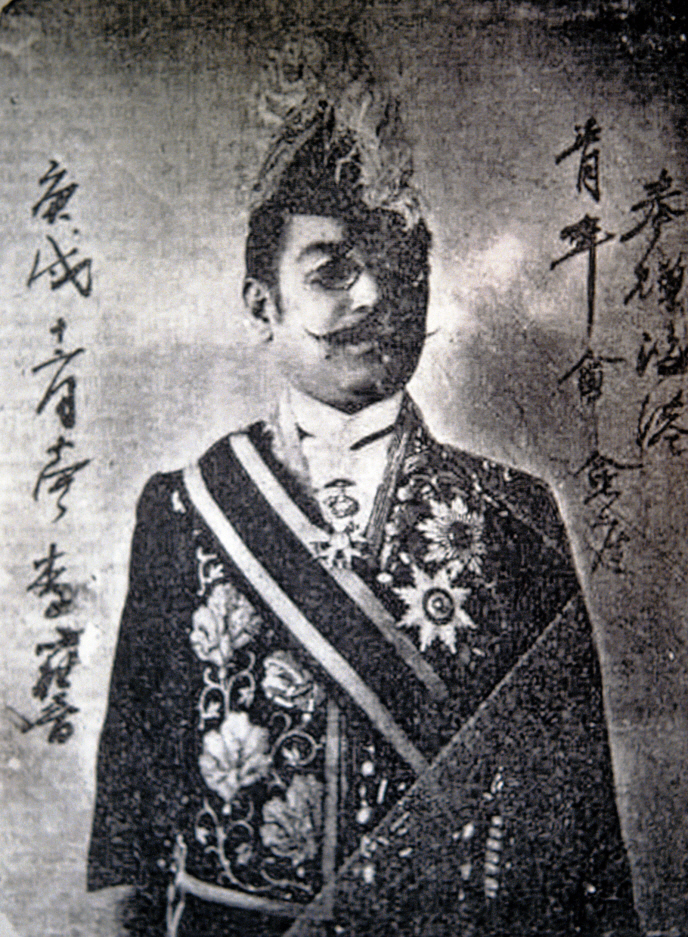
Yi Beom-jin, an official and later independence fighter against the Japanese. He supported secret emissaries sent by Gojong to The Hague in 1907.

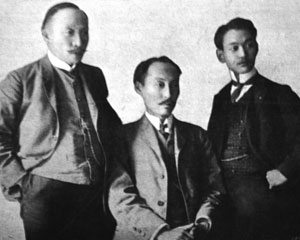
Three secret emissaries, Yi Tjoune, Yi Sang-seol, and Yi Wi-jong, who were sent to The Hague in 1907 by Emperor Gojong (for further reading, see Hague Secret Emissary Affair)

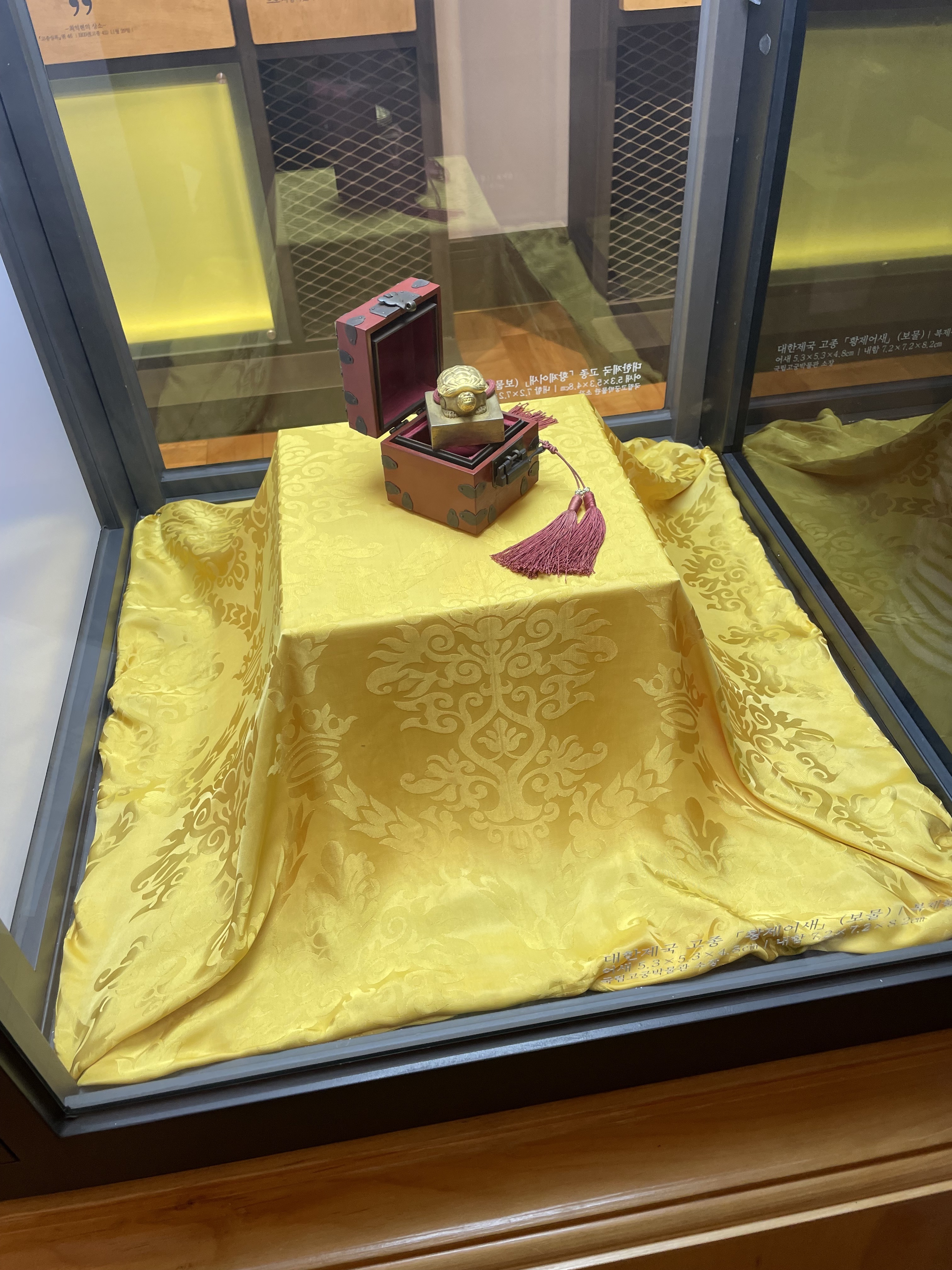
Replica of a stamp that Gojong used in his capacity as emperor

== In popular culture ==
- The 1904 American comedic opera, The Sho-Gun, written by George Ade and Gustav Luders, is set in the Korean Empire.
- The 2018 South Korean TV series, Mr. Sunshine, is set in the last days of the Korean Empire.
- The 2018 South Korean TV series, The Last Empress, depicts a modern-day Korean Empire in an alternate reality along with a dark secret of the imperial family leading to its demise.
- The 2020 South Korean TV series, The King: Eternal Monarch, takes place in an alternate reality where the Korean Empire continues to exist in the modern world.

== See also ==
- List of monarchs of Korea
- Korean Imperial Household
- Joseon
- Battle of Namdaemun
- National anthem of the Korean Empire
- Joseon Cybernation
