= Yi Wanyong =

Korean politician (1858–1926)

- 이완용
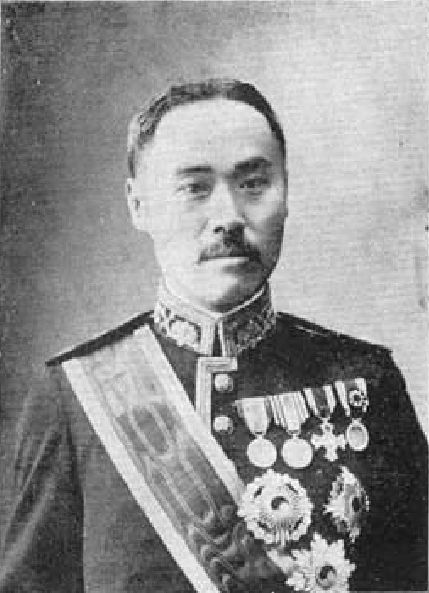
- Yi in 1910

7th Prime Minister of Korea
- In office 11 August 1910 – 29 August 1910
- Monarch: Sunjong
- Preceded by: Pak Che-soon
- Succeeded by: Office abolished

Personal details
- Born: 17 July 1858 Gwangju, Gyeonggi, Joseon
- Died: 12 February 1926 (aged 67) Keijō, Korea, Empire of Japan

Korean name
- Hangul: 이완용
- Hanja: 李完用
- RR: I Wanyong
- MR: I Wanyong

Art name
- Hangul: 일당
- Hanja: 一堂
- RR: Ildang
- MR: Iltang

Courtesy name
- Hangul: 경덕
- Hanja: 敬德
- RR: Gyeongdeok
- MR: Kyŏngdŏk

Yi Wanyong (Korean: 이완용; Hanja: 李完用; pronounced [iː wɐɲoŋ]; 17 July 1858 – 12 February 1926), also spelled Lee Wan-yong or Ye Wan-yong, was a Korean politician who served as the 7th Prime Minister of Korea. He is best remembered for signing the Eulsa Treaty and the Japan–Korea Annexation Treaty, which placed Korea under Japanese rule in 1910. Yi's name has since become a byword for Korean collaborators with the Empire of Japan.

== Early life and education ==
Yi Wanyong was born into the Ubong Yi clan (우봉 이씨; 牛峰李氏) to a poor aristocratic family in 1858, but grew up with a lot of support after he became the adoptive son of Yi Ho-jun, who was a friend of Heungseon Daewongun and an in-law. He learned English and theology at Yookyoung Park, went to the United States to live as a diplomat, and returned to Korea to serve as a pro-Russian politician until the 1896 Agwan Pacheon incident, where King Gojong and his crown prince took refuge at the Russian legation in Seoul. As Japan grew stronger, he became a pro-Japanese politician.

Yi was a founding member of the Independence Club established in 1896 and belonged to the "reform faction" which wanted to Westernize Korea and to open the country to foreign trade.

== Career ==
Yi was a prominent government minister at the time of Eulsa Treaty of 1905, and was the most outspoken supporter of the pact which made the Korean Empire a protectorate of the Empire of Japan, thus stripping it of its diplomatic sovereignty. Initially, all of the ministers were against signing the treaty. However, under threat of execution, five of the ministers signed the treaty. Yi was among the first to change his stance.

The treaty was signed in defiance of Korean Emperor Gojong, and Yi is thus accounted to be the chief of five ministers (including Pak Che-soon, Yi Chiyong, Yi Geun-taek, Gwon Jung-hyeon) who were later denounced as the "Five Eulsa Thieves" in Korea.

Under Japanese Resident-General Itō Hirobumi, Yi was promoted to the post of prime minister from 1906 to 1910. Yi was instrumental in forcing Emperor Gojong to abdicate in 1907, after Emperor Gojong tried to publicly denounce the Eulsa Treaty at the second international Hague Peace Convention. In 1907 Yi was also chief amongst the seven ministers who supported the Japan–Korea Treaty of 1907, which further placed the domestic affairs of Korea under Japan's control, thus completing the colonisation of Korea by Japan. Yi is therefore also listed in Korea amongst the Seven Jeongmi Traitors.

=== Assassination attempt ===
In 1909, he was seriously injured in an assassination attempt by the "Five Eulsa Traitors Assassination Group". The incident happened on 22 December 1909, when he and other targeted officials were attending a memorial service in Jong-hyeon Catholic Church (present-day Myeongdong Cathedral) for the recently deceased King Leopold II of Belgium. The assassin, Lee Jae-myeong (이재명; 李在明, 1887–1910) caught wind and disguised himself as a chestnut vendor outside the church. At around 11:30 a.m., Yi Wanyong appeared and was heading towards his rickshaw when Lee Jae-myeong sprung into action, stabbing him three times with a knife while shouting 'Long Live the Independence of Korea'. The assassin was quickly subdued by Japanese police and was arrested with serious injuries; he would be sentenced to death.

The assassination attempt left Yi Wanyong with a damaged left lung, causing him to suffer from pneumonia and lung diseases, which eventually became the cause of his death.

=== Japanese rule ===
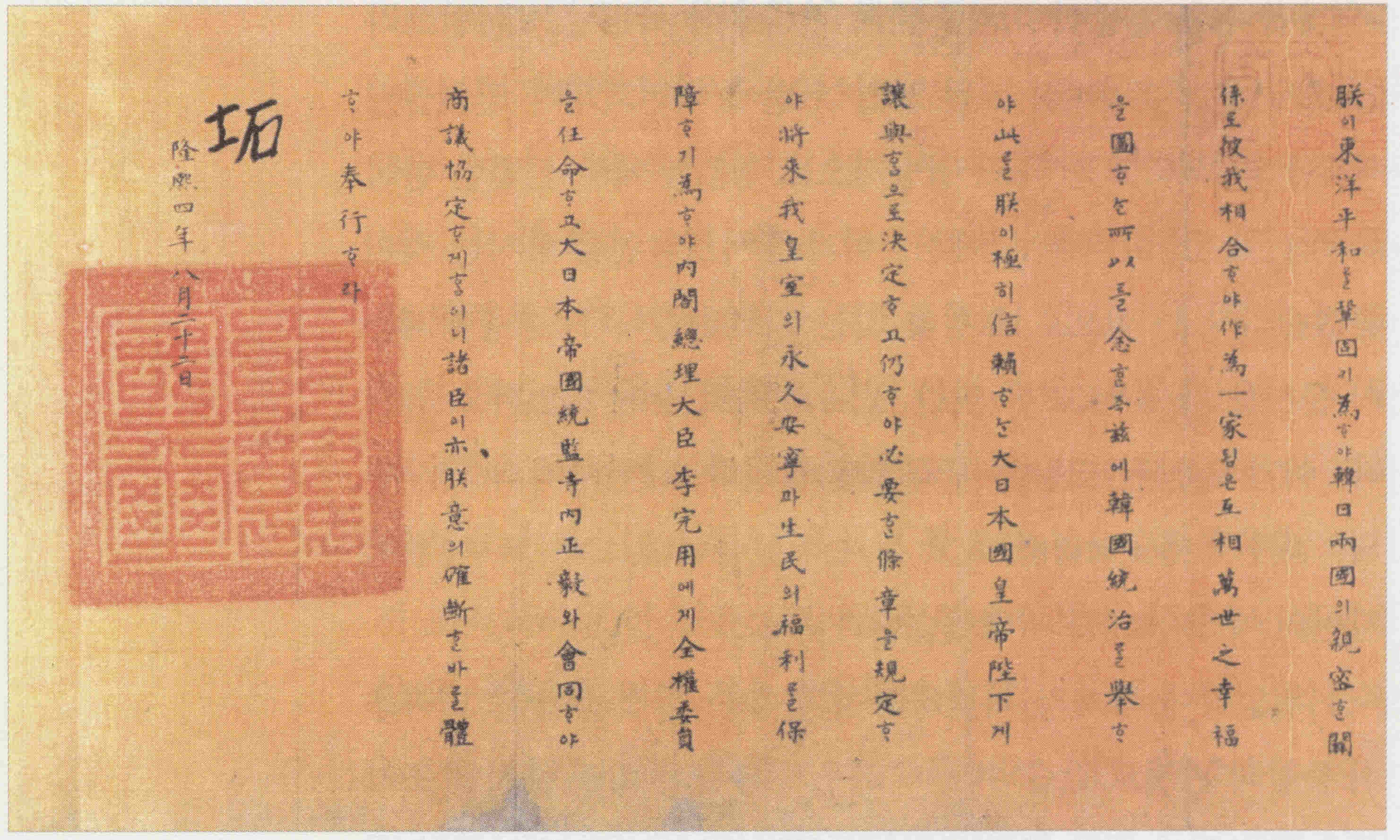
General power of attorney to Yi Wanyong signed and sealed by Sunjong.

In 1910, Yi signed the Japan-Korea Annexation Treaty by which Japan took full control over Korea, while Korean Emperor Sunjong refused to sign. For his cooperation with the Japanese, Yi is also listed in Korea amongst the eight Gyeongsul Traitors. He was rewarded with a peerage in the Japanese kazoku system, becoming a hakushaku (Count), in 1910, and was raised to the title of kōshaku (Marquis) in 1921. He died in February 1926, received a grand funeral with the Governor-General at that time, Saitō Makoto in attendance, and was posthumously awarded the Supreme Order of the Chrysanthemum.

Knowing that his grave would likely be vandalized because of his actions, Yi Wanyong chose a plot of forest land in Iksan, North Jeolla Province, as his final resting place because it would be difficult for people to find. He also made decoy graves in nearby mountains. However, his true grave was eventually found and was vandalized to the point that police officers were dispatched to guard the area during the Japanese colonial era. After liberation in 1945, his grave was trampled, and in April 1979 his great-grandchildren had his grave dug up, his body cremated and his ashes scattered in a nearby stream. The coffin lid was bought for ₩50000 and burnt.

== Legacy ==
Yi's name has become a byword for "traitor" in contemporary South Korea.

The South Korean Special law to redeem pro-Japanese collaborators' property was enacted in 2005 and the committee confiscated the property of the descendants of nine people that had collaborated with Japan when Korea was annexed by Japan in August 1910. Yi is one of those heading the list.

== Family ==
- Father
  - Ye Ho-seok (이호석; 李鎬奭) or Ye Seok-jun (이석준; 李奭俊)
    - Adoptive father - Ye Hyo-jun (이호준; 李鎬俊; 1821–1901)
- Mother
  - Lady Shin (신씨; 辛氏; ?–1893)
    - Adoptive mother - Lady Min of the Yeoheung Min clan; daughter of Min Yong-hyeon (민용현; 閔龍顯; 1786–?) (Note: He is the 4th great-grandson of Queen Inhyeon's father, Min Yu-jung)
- Wife and children
  - Lady Jo of the Yangju Jo clan (양주 조씨; 楊州 趙氏); daughter of Jo Byeong-ik (조병익; 趙秉翼)
    - Son - Ye Seung-gu (이승구; 李升九)
    - Son - Ye Hang-gu (이항구; 李恒九; 1881–1945)

== In popular culture ==
- Yi is portrayed by Woo Sang-jeon in the 2015 film Assassination.
- Yi is portrayed by Jung Seung-gil the 2018 South Korean television series Mr. Sunshine.
