= Five Eulsa Traitors =

Term for the 1905 Eulsa Treaty signers

- Hangul: 을사오적
- Hanja: 乙巳五賊
- Revised Romanization: Eulsa ojeok
- McCune–Reischauer: Ŭlsa ojŏk

The Five Eulsa Traitors (Korean: 을사오적) refers to the five officials serving under Emperor Gojong who signed the Japan–Korea Treaty of 1905, which is also referred to as the Eulsa Treaty. The treaty made Korea a protectorate of Japan. The five officials were Education Minister Lee Wan-yong, Army Minister Yi Geun-taek, Interior Minister Yi Ji-yong, Foreign Affairs Minister Pak Chesoon, and Agriculture, Commerce, and Industry Minister Gwon Jung-hyeon.

Initially, all of the ministers were against signing the treaty. Pak Chesoon even declared that he would rather commit suicide if Japan forced him to sign the treaty. However, under threat of execution, five of the ministers signed the treaty. Lee Wan-yong, Yi Ji-yong, and Gwon Jung-hyeon were the first to change their stance.

Prime Minister Han Kyu-seol, the ministers of finance and justice, and Emperor Gojong refused to sign the treaty. However, the treaty was deemed to have gone into effect with the five ministers' signatures, even though the Emperor refused to sign the treaty himself, an act required to bring the treaty to conclusion under Korean law. The Japanese government forced Prime Minister Han to step down and installed Pak in his place.

Widespread public dissatisfaction at the treaty was directed at the five ministers, and an "assassination group" was formed targeting the five. On December 6, 1905, one Korean Army soldier attempted to shoot Pak Chesoon as he was entering the palace. Yi Ji-yong's house was burned in the same year. Gwon Jung-hyeon was injured in an attack in 1907, and Yi Wan-yong was seriously injured in an assassination attempt in 1909.

In 2005, the Research Center for National Issues identified the names of the five officials responsible for the Eulsa Treaty, as part of its efforts to compile a directory of individual Koreans who had collaborated with the Japanese before and during its colonial rule.

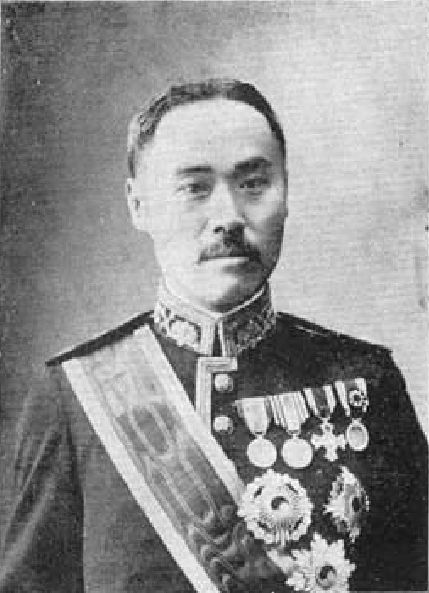
Yi Wan-yong
Education Minister

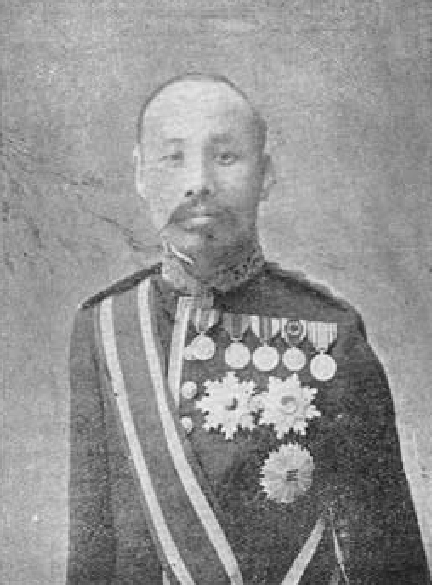
Yi Geun-taek
Army Minister

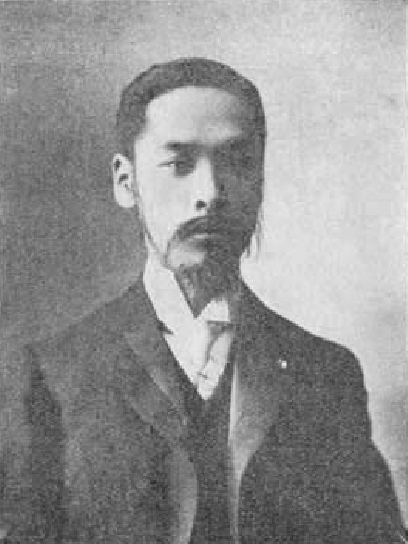
Yi Ji-yong
Interior Minister

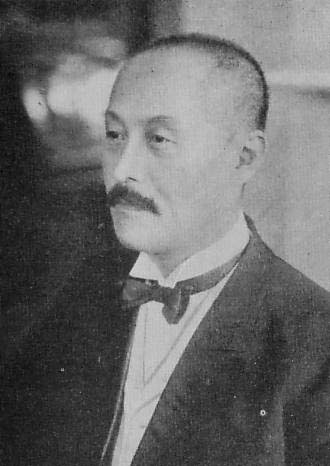
Pak Chesoon
Foreign Affairs Minister

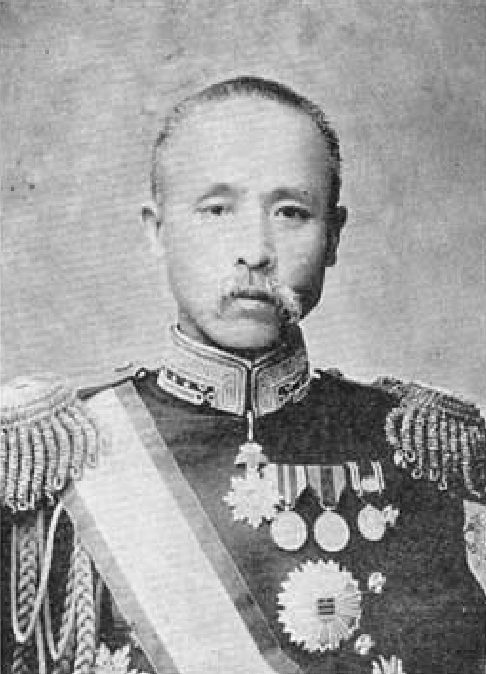
Gwon Jung-hyeon
Agriculture, Commerce, and Industry Minister

== See also ==
- Chinilpa - a word that described people who collaborated with the Japanese during its occupation of Korea
- Anti-Japanese sentiment in Korea
