= Prime Minister of the Korean Empire =

Non-executive head of government

Prime Minister of Korean Empire 대한제국의 내각총리대신
- Style: His Excellency
- Residence: Prime Minister's Official Residence (Korea)
- Appointer: HIM The Emperor
- Term length: Four years or less
- Inaugural holder: Kim Hong-jip
- Formation: 1895
- Abolished: 1910

The prime minister of Korean Empire (Korean: 대한제국의 내각총리대신; Hanja: 內閣總理大臣; RR: Naegak Chongri Daeshin) was the highest official in the Korean Empire under the emperor, who was the sole source of all authority. The prime minister was appointed by the emperor of Korea and had to enjoy the confidence of the parliament to remain in office. He was the head of the Cabinet, led the various administrative branches, and had supervision and appointment rights of other state ministers in the name of the monarch. The literal translation of the Korean name for the office is prime minister of the Cabinet of the Korean Empire.

== History ==
Prior to the adoption of its modern constitution, Korea had in practice no such document. Originally, a Chinese-inspired legal system was enacted. It described a government based on an elaborate and rational meritocratic bureaucracy, serving, in theory, under the ultimate authority of the monarch. Under this system, the yeonguijeong, or chief state councillor, was the head of the State Council, the highest organ of Korea's pre-modern royal government during the Joseon era and until briefly under the Korean Empire. The office was replaced with the appointment of Kim Hong-jip (previously the last Yeonguijeong) to the new position of Prime Minister in 1895 with the Gabo Reform.

With the annexation of Korea to the Empire of Japan, the office came to an end.

During the Provisional Government of the Republic of Korea in Exile in Shanghai, China, a prime minister position was recreated for a brief few days for Syngman Rhee to replace the chairman of the Provisional Legislative Assembly. The role was changed over to chief executive in 1919, changed again as premier from 1919-1926 and finally as president from 1926–1948.

The current divided Korea has two respective prime ministers on both sides, which are the prime minister of North Korea and the prime minister of South Korea.

== Lists of prime ministers of Korea ==
- List of prime ministers of the Korean Empire
- List of prime ministers of Korea
