= Seo Jae-chang =

Korean politician (1866–1884)

- Hangul: 서재창
- Hanja: 徐載昌
- RR: Seo Jaechang
- MR: Sŏ Chaech'ang

Seo Jae-chang (Korean: 서재창; Hanja: 徐載昌; 29 October 1866 – 13 December 1884) was a Korean politician, serviceperson, liberal ideologist during the Joseon period. He was a member of the reformist Party(개화당;開化黨). In 1884 he was a participant in the Kapsin Coup. The coup failed and he was arrested and executed. Seo was the younger brother of Philip Jaisohn.

== Biography ==
Jae-chang was born 1866 (Daegu Seo Clan) in Bosong in South Jeolla Province. He was the fourth son of Seo Gwang-ho, governor of Dongbok County and Lady Lee of Seongju. His elder brothers were Jae-chun, Jae-hyung and Jae-pil and his younger brother was Jae-wu. He had two sisters.

He studied in Japan, recommended by Yu Dae-chi and Lee Dong-in. Jae-chang studied sericulture and military science. Later he returned to his country.

In 1884 he adopted a distant relation Seo Sang-wu's adopted son. In January to July, 1884, he returned to Japan. He entered a Toyama military school with Jae-pil, but in July he went to Seoul to plan a revolt with Kim Ok-kyun, Pak Yŏnghyo and other members of Reformist Partys, Hong Yeong-sik, Park Yeong-kyo, Yun Chi-ho, Yun Ung-ryeol, Jae-pil and his father's fifth cousin Soh Kwang-pom.

In October, they undertook the Kapsin Coup in Seoul. Queen Min mobilized Qing dynasty forces, who killed Hong Young-sik and Park Yeong-kyo in battle. The coup failed.

In October 21, Jae-chang escaped, but was seized by the Chinese. He was sent to Seoul prison of Uikeumbu. On December 13, he was executed by firing squad, Gungigam in Seoul. His family was arrested and to imprisonment, with some committing suicide. Only Jae-pil escaped on a Japanese boat to exile in Tokyo.

== Family ==
- Father
  - Seo Gwang-hyo (서광효; 徐光孝; 22 August 1800 – 19 December 1884)
    - Adoptive Father - Seo Gwang-rae (서광래; 徐光萊)
- Mother
  - Lady Yi of the Seongju Yi clan (성주 이씨; 星州 李氏; 1830 – 19 December 1884)
- Siblings
  - Older sister - Lady Seo of the Daegu Seo clan (서씨)
  - Older half-brother - Seo Jae-hyeong (서재형; 徐載衡; 1851 – 13 December 1884)
  - Older brother - Seo Jae-chun (서재춘; 徐載春; 2 March 1854 – 5 September 1888)
  - Older brother - Seo Jae-pil (서재필; 徐載弼; 4 January 1864 – 5 January 1951); adopted by Seo Gyeong-ha
  - Younger brother - Seo Jae-woo (서재우, 徐載雨/載愚; 1868–1905)
  - Younger sister - Seo Gi-seok (서기석)
- Wife and children
  - Lady Kim of the Andong Kim clan (안동 김씨; 1865 – 3 March 1941)
    - Adoptive son - Seo Chan-seok (서찬석; 徐讚錫; 29 January 1893–?); son of his younger cousin Seo Jae-yeong
      - Adoptive Daughter-in-law - Lady Yun of the Haepyeong Yun clan (해평 윤씨; 1892–?)
        - Adoptive grandson - Seo Jeong-won (서정원; 徐程源; 1917–?)
        - Adoptive grandson - Seo Yeong-won (서영원; 徐泳源; 13 September 1913–?)
          - Adoptive granddaughter-in-law - Lady Shin of the Goryeong Shin clan (고령 신씨; 1920–?)
- Concubine and children
  - Lady Cho of the Pyongyang Cho clan (평양 조씨; 平壤 趙氏)
    - Unnamed son
      - Grandson - Seo Hui-won (서희원; 徐希源; 21 September 1924 – 7 April 2004)
