= Joseon Susinsa =

1876–1882 Korean mission to Japan

Joseon Susinsa (Korean: 조선 수신사; Hanja: 朝鮮修信使) is the term for diplomatic missions from Joseon to the Empire of Japan after Korea's forced opening in 1876. As the hegemony of East Asia was transferred from China to the Western powers, relations between Joseon and the Japanese empires were reversed, and Joseon's goodwill mission called "Tongsinsa" was changed to the term "Susinsa" meaning "receiver of advanced culture". They were dispatched on three occasions from 1876 to 1882.

== First Susinsa ==
After the Japan-Korea treaty of 1876, Kim Ki-soo was appointed as the first Susinsa and went to Japan. Kim Ki-soo and his party returned after seeing modernized Japan through various Western civilized cultures. He left a record in his book <Illdong kiyu>《일동기유》(日東記遊, 1877)(1-4 volumes)

== Second Susinsa ==
In 1880, in the 17th year of King Gojong's reign, Kim Hong-jip and his party were appointed as the second Susinsa, dispatched to Japan, and returned after seeing Japan's remarkable development, igniting interest in world situations.

At that time, Kim Hong-jip returned to Joseon with Hwang Joon-hun's book ≪조선책략≫(朝鮮策略), which summarized the contents of the meeting with Kim Hong-jip. This gave rise to the Enlightenment party(Gaehwapa) in Joseon and strengthened the claim of trade with the United States. Finally, in 1882, the United States-Korea Treaty of 1882 was concluded by the Qing dynasty's mediation seeking to check Russia and Japan. And as a result, a diplomatic mission(Bobingsa) was sent to United States in 1883. Second Susinsa and Enlightenment party insisted on reforming Joseon's system, modeled after Japan's, resulting in a conflict of opinion between a group of Yeongsunsa who returned from an inspection tour of the Qing China. Those who went to Japan as Susinsa usually insisted on radical reforms, while those who went to Qing China as Yeongsunsa generally insisted on gradual reforms.

Their records were kept by Kim Hong-jip's book ≪수신사일기≫(修信使日記)(1-2 volumes)

== Third Susinsa ==
In 1882, in the 19th year of King Gojong's reign, Pak Yung-hio and his party were dispatched as third Susinsa to offer an apology to Japan immediately after the August 8, 1882 Imo incident of Korea . Pak Yung-hio left the record in the 《사화기략》(使和記略).

It is known that Korean national flag 'Taegeukgi' was first used at that time, but there is a theory that it is not true.

== Susinsa Girok(Susinsa Records) ==
Kim Ki-soo, Kim Hong-jip, and Pak Yung-hio, who were sent as Susinsa, left the following records.

•<Illdong kiyu>《일동기유》(日東記遊, 1877)(1-4 volumes), <Susinsa ilgi>(修信使日記) - Kim Ki-soo

•<Susinsa ilgi> 《수신사일기》(修信使日記)(1-2 volumes)- Kim Hong-jip

•<Sahwa giryak>《사화기략》(使和記略, 1882)- Pak Yung-hio

In 1958, the National Institute of Korean History compiled this by tying it up with the "Susinsa Girok" record, and the first volume of <Susinsa ilgi> was written by Kim Ki-soo and the second volume was written by Kim Hong-jip. <Susinsa ilgi> means daily records of Susinsa.

== See also ==
- Annals of the Joseon Dynasty (Joseon Wangjo Sillok)
- Seungjeongwon ilgi
- History of Korea
- Joseon Tongsinsa
