= Kabo Reform =

Late 19th-century reforms in Korea

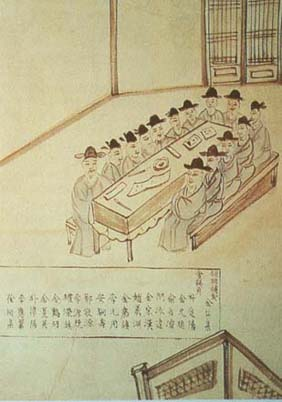
- Officials of Gungukgimucheo
- Date: 1894–1896

- Kabo Reform
- Hangul: 갑오개혁
- Hanja: 甲午改革
- RR: Gabogaehyeok
- MR: Kabogaehyŏk

The Kabo Reform (Korean: 갑오개혁; Hanja: 甲午改革) describes a series of sweeping reforms suggested to the government of Korea, beginning in 1894 and ending in 1896 during the reign of Gojong of Korea in response to the Donghak Peasant Revolution. Historians debate the degree of Japanese influence in this program, as well as its effect in encouraging modernization.

The term Kabo (갑오; 甲午) comes from the name of the year 1894 in the traditional sexagenary cycle.

== Background ==
The disarray and blatant corruption in the Korean government, particularly in the three main areas of revenues – land tax, military service, and the state granary system – weighed heavily on the Korean peasantry.

Of special note is the corruption of the local functionaries (Hyangi) who could purchase an appointment as administrators and cloak their predations on the farmers with an aura of officialdom. Yangban families, formerly well-respected for their status as a noble class, were increasingly seen as little more than commoners who were unwilling to meet their responsibilities to their communities.

Faced with increasing corruption in the government, brigandage of the disenfranchised (such as the mounted fire brigands, or Hwajok, and the boat-borne water brigands or Sujok) as well as abuse by the military, many poor villagers sought to pool their resources such as land, tools, and production skills in order to survive.

Despite the government abolishing slavery and burning the records in 1801, increasing numbers of peasants and farmers become involved in "mutual assistance associations". Institutions such as the Catholic and Protestant missions, with the egalitarian nature of their teachings garnered followings among the Yangban, though commonly in the more urban areas.

Arguably of greater influence were the religious teachings of Choe Je-u, (최제우, 崔濟愚, 1824–1864) called Donghak or "Eastern Learning" which became especially popular in rural areas. Themes of exclusionism (of foreign influences), nationalism, salvation, and social consciousness were promoted to allow illiterate farmers to understand the concepts and accept them more readily.

Choi, like many Koreans, was alarmed by the intrusion of Christianity and the Anglo-French occupation of Beijing during the Second Opium War. He believed that the best way to counter foreign influence in Korea was to introduce democratic and human rights reforms internally. Nationalism and social reform struck a chord among the peasant guerrillas, and Donghak spread all across Korea. Progressive revolutionaries organized the peasants into a cohesive structure. Arrested in 1863 following the Chinju Uprising led by Yu Kye-cheun, Choi was charged with "misleading the people and sowing discord in society". Choi was beheaded in 1864, sending many of his followers into hiding in the mountains and leaving the Korean populace to continue to suffer.

King Gojong (r. 1864–1907), enthroned at the age of twelve, succeeded King Cheolchong (r. 1849 – 1863). King Gojong's father, Heungseon Daewongun (Yi Ha-Ung; 1820–1898), ruled as the de facto regent and inaugurated far-ranging reform to strengthen the central administration. Among his targeted reforms was addressing the inherited rule by a few elite ruling families by the adoption of a merit system for official appointments.

In addition, Seowon (private academies), which threatened to develop a parallel system to the corrupt government and enjoyed special privileges and large land-holdings, were repressed through taxes despite bitter opposition from Confucian scholars. The decision to rebuild palace buildings and finance it through additional levies on the population caused Heungseon Daewongun's attempted reforms to antagonize the three largest constituencies supporting the government: the ruling elite, the Confucian scholars, and the general population. Heungseon Daewongun was impeached in 1873 and forced into retirement by the supporters of Empress Myeongseong.

On 27 February 1876, the Japan–Korea Treaty of 1876, also known in Japan as the Japanese-Korean Treaty of Amity (Nitchō-shūkōjōki (日朝修好条規), Korean: 강화도 조약; Hanja: 江華島條約; MR: Kanghwado choyak) was signed. It was designed to open up Korea to Japanese trade, and the rights granted to Japan under the treaty were similar to those granted to European powers in Japan following the visit of Commodore Matthew Perry in 1854. However, the treaty ended Korea's status as a protectorate of China, forced open three Korean ports to Japanese trade, granted extraterritorial rights to Japanese citizens, and was an unequal treaty signed under duress of the Unyo Incident of 1875 (gunboat diplomacy).

Daewongun remained opposed to any concessions to Japan or the Western Europeans, helped organize the mutiny of 1882 Imo Incident, an anti-Japanese outbreak against the Empress and her allies. Motivated by resentment of the preferential treatment given to newly trained troops, Daewongun's forces, or "old military", killed Japanese training cadre and attacked the Japanese legation. Japanese diplomats, policemen, students and some Min clan members were also killed during the incident.

Daewongun was restored to power briefly, only to be forcibly taken to China by Chinese troops dispatched to Seoul to prevent further disorder. In August 1882, the Treaty of Chemulpo (Japan–Korea Treaty of 1882) indemnified the families of the Japanese victims, paid reparation to the Japanese government in the amount of 500,000 yen and allowed a company of Japanese guards to be stationed at the Japanese legation in Seoul.

The struggle between Heungseon Daewongun's followers and those of Empress Myeongseong was further complicated by competition from a Korean independence faction known as the Progressive Party (Kaehwadang) as well as Conservative faction. While the former sought Japan's support, the latter sought China's support. On 4 December 1884, the Korean independence group, assisted by the Japanese, attempted a coup (Kapsin Chongbyon; Coup d'État of 1884) and established a pro-Japanese government under the reigning king, dedicated to the independence of Korea from Chinese suzerainty.

However, this proved to be short-lived as conservative Korean officials requested the help of Chinese forces stationed in Korea. The coup was put down by Chinese troops, and a Korean mob killed both Japanese officers and Japanese residents in retaliation. Some leaders of the independence faction, including Kim Okgyun, fled to Japan, while others were executed.

== Donghak revolution, and first Sino-Japanese war, 1894 ==
The outbreak of the Donghak Peasant Revolution in 1894 provided a seminal pretext for direct military intervention by Japan in the affairs of Korea. Seeking redressal of long-standing hardship and corruption, disparate factions among the Korean peasant population coalesced into a militant force and revolted against the Korean administration. In April 1894, the Korean government asked for Chinese assistance in ending the Donghak Peasant Revolt. In response, Japanese leaders, citing a violation of the Convention of Tientsin as a pretext, decided upon military intervention to challenge China. China requested Japan to withdraw her troops; Japan refused and proposed that the Qing and Japan co-ordinate to reform the Korean government. The Qing refused.

On 3 May 1894, 1,500 Qing dynasty forces appeared in Incheon. The same day, 6,000 Japanese forces also landed in Incheon leading to the Sino-Japanese War. Japan deposed the Korean government and installed a new government which demanded the Qing leave, and began a programme of reform. Japan won the First Sino-Japanese War, and China signed the Treaty of Shimonoseki in 1895. Among its many stipulations, the treaty recognized "the full and complete independence and autonomy of Korea," thus ending Korea's tributary relationship with the Chinese Qing Dynasty, leading to the proclamation of full independence of Joseon Korea in 1895.

At the same time, Japan suppressed the Donghak Revolution with Korean government forces. Though the revolt had ended, issues and complaints of the Korean peasant population remained un-addressed.

== Reforms ==
The reforms were largely accomplished in three stages, according to the changing members of the reform council and the involvement of Japan.

=== First reforms ===
The first reforms took place from July to October 1894, based on the original reform bill presented by the Japanese ambassador, Ōtori Keisuke (大鳥圭介). Previously, the reform bill had been refused by the Joseon court and Qing dynasty. As Japan was focused more on the Sino-Japanese War, many of the first reforms reflected the desired reforms of the progressive council members and some of the reforms demanded by the peasants of the Donghak Peasant Revolution did not go unheard. The deliberate Council passed 210 reform bills by Kim Hong-jip. At the first stage of reform, there was little interference from Japan.

Two-hundred and ten articles were established, most notable was the restructuring of central government by reducing the king's responsibilities and placing more power in the Uijeongbu. The gwageo system was abolished and replaced by a Japanese bureaucratic system. The administration of financial affairs were centralized, the taxation system redressed, a new monetary system allowed the use of Japanese currency, and the measurement system was changed to that of Japan.

Other social reforms were addressed as well; discrimination based on the class system, slavery, underage marriage were banned, and widows were granted the right to remarry. These reforms would legally change the traditional feudal system that had been followed for hundreds of years.

=== Second reforms ===
The second state of reform took place from December 1894 to July 1895. Japan closed down the Gunguk Gimucheo in December 1894 as the outcome of the Sino-Japanese War was leaning to their favor and set up a new coalition cabinet consisting of Kim Hong-jip and Park Yung-hio. The cabinet presented a new law, Hongbeom 14jo (홍범 14조, "Exemplary Rules" 14 articles), which proclaimed the severance of the subordinate relationship with China, abolition of nepotism in government, and restructuring of government offices and their duties.

With this law as the foundation, 213 new articles were created. The names of Uijeongbu and its subsidiaries were changed to the modern naegak (내각, cabinet) and bu (부, department). Administrative districts were reorganized to 23 bu(부, region) and 337 gun(군, district). New financial bureaus were installed throughout the nation to overlook tax affairs, military, and police systems were overhauled and modernized, judicial systems were changed with new courthouse and judiciary laws.

The second reform measures were halted when Park Yung-hio, who had been at the center of the reform efforts, fled to Japan after being accused of conspiracy to treason by those who were against the reformations that were taking place.

=== Assassination of Queen Min, 1895 ===
The Japanese minister to Korea, Miura Gorō, orchestrated a plot against 43-year-old Queen Min (later given the title Empress Myeongseong), and on 8 October 1895, she was assassinated by Japanese agents. In 2001, Russian reports on the assassination were found in the archives of the Foreign Ministry of the Russian Federation. The documents included the testimony of King Gojong, several witnesses of the assassination, and Karl Ivanovich Weber's report to Aleksey Lobanov-Rostovsky, the Foreign Minister of Russia. Weber was the chargé d'affaires at the Russian legation in Seoul at that time. According to a Russian eyewitness, Seredin-Sabatin (Середин-Cабатин), an employee of the Korean king, a group of Japanese agents entered Gyeongbokgung, killed Queen Min and desecrated her body in the north wing of the palace.

When he heard the news, Heungseon Daewongun returned to the royal palace the same day. On 11 February 1896, King Gojong and the crown prince moved from Gyeongbokgung to the Russian legation in Jeong-dong, Seoul, from where they governed for about one year, an event known as the Korea royal refuge at the Russian legation. After returning to the royal palace, the royal family was still guarded by Russian guards.

In the midst of disarray in Joseon politics at this time, a series of Seonbi scholars mobilized volunteers to fight against the external foreign influence on the government. This also led to the uprising of the Eulmi temporary armies aimed at avenging the assassination of Queen Min.

=== Third reforms ===
Spurred greatly by the assassination of the queen and subsequent unrest, the government, then led by a new progressive cabinet headed by Kim Hong-jip and Yu Kil-chun, carried out reforms from October 1895 to February 1896. A special reform body, Gunguk Gimucheo (군국기무처, Deliberative Council), was created to establish rules. Their policies resulted in the official discarding of the lunar calendar in favor of the modern Gregorian solar calendar, the official designation of regnal years independent of the Chinese tradition, the creation of a postal service, the introduction of primary schools and a new educational system and the renewal of the military system.

The most controversial reform at this time was the proclamation of the "Short Hair Act" (Korean: 단발령; Hanja: 斷髮令), i.e. cutting off the traditional Korean male sangtu and reformation of traditional attire. It triggered many protests among the people, most notably the conservative scholars, who were already disillusioned by the pro-Japanese cabinet. They had created the Righteous Army and had actively protested nationwide, escalating after the assassination of Queen Myeongseong in 1895. After King Gojong and the Crown Prince fled for refuge to the Russian legation in 1896, this opposition resulted in the murders of Kim Hong-jip and other cabinet members, and the reformations came to an end.

=== Main provisions of the Kabo Reform ===
The Kabo Reform was similar to the Meiji Restoration in Japan and produced the following sweeping changes and declarations:

1. Korea is a sovereign country (i.e., completely independent from China's external interference).
2. Hierarchical society (class system) is abolished. Social privileges of the Yangban classes are eliminated.
3. Those with talent are to be allowed to study and appointed to government posts based on merit alone, regardless of social class.
4. The army is to be established on the basis of conscription, regardless of background. A modern police force and military are established.
5. All official documents are to be written in Hangul, and not hanja (Chinese characters).
6. Leather working, acting, and so on are to no longer be regarded as degrading work, and the people who do them are no longer outcasts.
7. A sound system of fiscal management and to use the government's fiscal resources to create wealth for the country is developed.
8. Torture of suspects and witnesses was banned, guilt by association ended (punishment of family members of criminals).
9. End of merchant monopolies.
10. Ban of sale of slaves from 1886 confirmed, and all forms of legal slavery ended.
11. Marriage age raised to twenty for men and sixteen for women (outlawing child marriage).

=== Protests for democracy and the proclamation of Korean Empire, 1896–1898 ===
After the Royal Refuge, some Korean activists established the Independence Club (독립협회, 獨立協會) in 1896. They claimed that Korea should negotiate with Western powers, particularly Russia, to counterbalance the growing influence of Japan and Russia. This club had contributed to the construction of Independence Gate, and they held regular meetings at the Jongno streets, demanding democratic reforms as Korea became a constitutional monarchy, and an end to Japanese and Russian influence in Korean affairs. In October 1897, King Gojong decided to return to his other palace, Deoksugung, and proclaimed the founding of the Korean Empire. During this period, the Korean government conducted a westernization policy. It was not an enduring reform, however, and the Independence Club was dissolved on 25 December 1898 as Emperor Gojong officially announced a prohibition on unofficial congresses.

== See also ==
- Gapsin Coup
- Gwangmu Reform
- Timeline of the Gwangmu Reform
- History of Korea
- Korean independence movement
