= 1883 Korean special mission to the United States =

First Korean to US diplomatic mission

1883 Korean mission to the United States
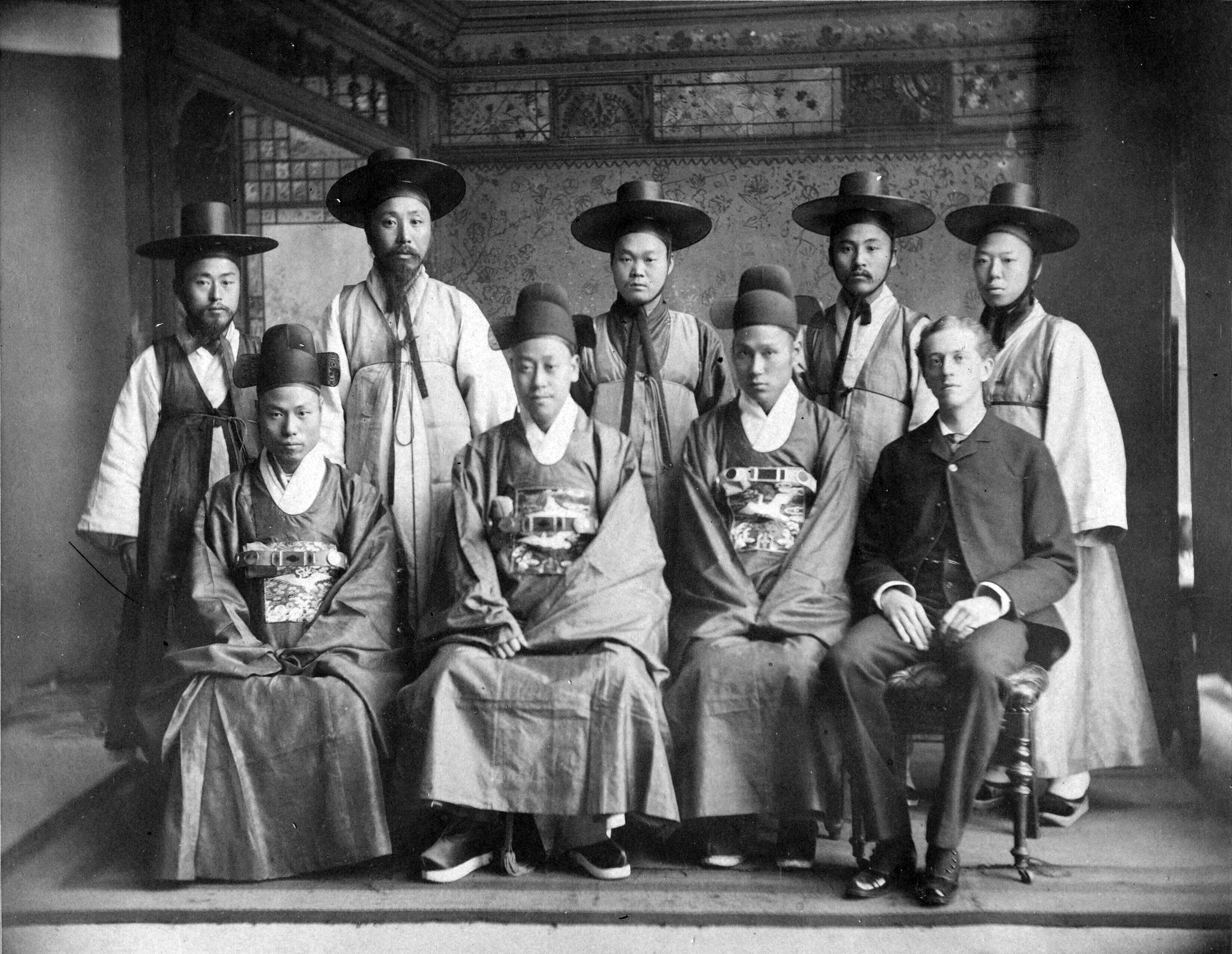
- Members of the mission before departure. (1883)
- Native name: 보빙사
- Date: July 16 – October 13, 1883
- Type: Special diplomatic mission
- Motive: Assert Joseon's independence from Qing; Request American advisors for Korea
- Outcome: Successful visit, but most plans either not carried out due to internal instability or American reneging

In 1883, Joseon sent the first ever special diplomatic mission from Korea to the United States. In Korean, the mission is known as Pobingsa (Korean: 보빙사; Hanja: 報聘使).

In 1876, Korea emerged from centuries of isolationism after it was forced open by Japan. In 1880, the Korean monarch Gojong became interested in establishing relations with the United States, in order to counterbalance the encroaching Russian Empire, which was occupying more and more territory north of the Korean border. Gojong also wanted to symbolically treat directly with the United States, in order to signal to the world that Korea was independent from Qing China, of which it was a tributary. In addition, he also wanted to receive American advisors to modernize the country.

The mission departed from Incheon on July 16, 1883, and arrived in San Francisco, United States on September 2. Its members traveled along the first transcontinental railroad to the East Coast, making various stops along the way. Everywhere they visited, they were enthusiastically hosted by American dignitaries. They met with U.S. president Chester A. Arthur twice, and received promises that America would make an effort to send advisors. After the mission's official conclusion on October 13, member Yu Kil-chun became the first known Korean to study abroad in the United States. Min Yongik, Soh Kwang-pom, and Pyŏn Su traveled back to Korea by way of Europe, North Africa, around the Arabian Peninsula, and the Indian Ocean, and became the first known Koreans to circumnavigate the Earth.

The mission resulted in the creation of Korea's first modern postal system, but is otherwise generally agreed to have had little immediate impact on Korea's reform. Shortly after the return of the mission, the Gapsin Coup resulted in the deaths, injuries, or exiles of many of the mission's former members. In addition, the U.S. delayed on sending advisors for years afterwards, and reneged on several of its tentative promises.

== Korean name ==
The diplomatic mission is referred to in Korean as Pobingsa, which was the general term for foreign missions, although it has since become largely associated with this specific mission.

== Background ==
Since the 17th century, Korea (Joseon) had been under a policy of isolationism due to a series of invasions (namely the 1592–1598 Japanese invasions, 1627 Later Jin invasion of Joseon, and 1636 Qing invasion). But by the early 19th century, this policy became strained by increasing foreign encroachments. European trading vessels were turned away on a number of occasions, which occasionally resulted in violent clashes. Joseon's neighbors were subjected to similar pressures. Joseon's suzerain, Qing (China), was forcefully opened by the British in the 1839–1842 First Opium War. The United States forced the also-isolationist Japan to open in 1854, with the Perry Expedition. Japan then sent its first diplomatic mission to the U.S. in 1860, 23 years before Korea's.

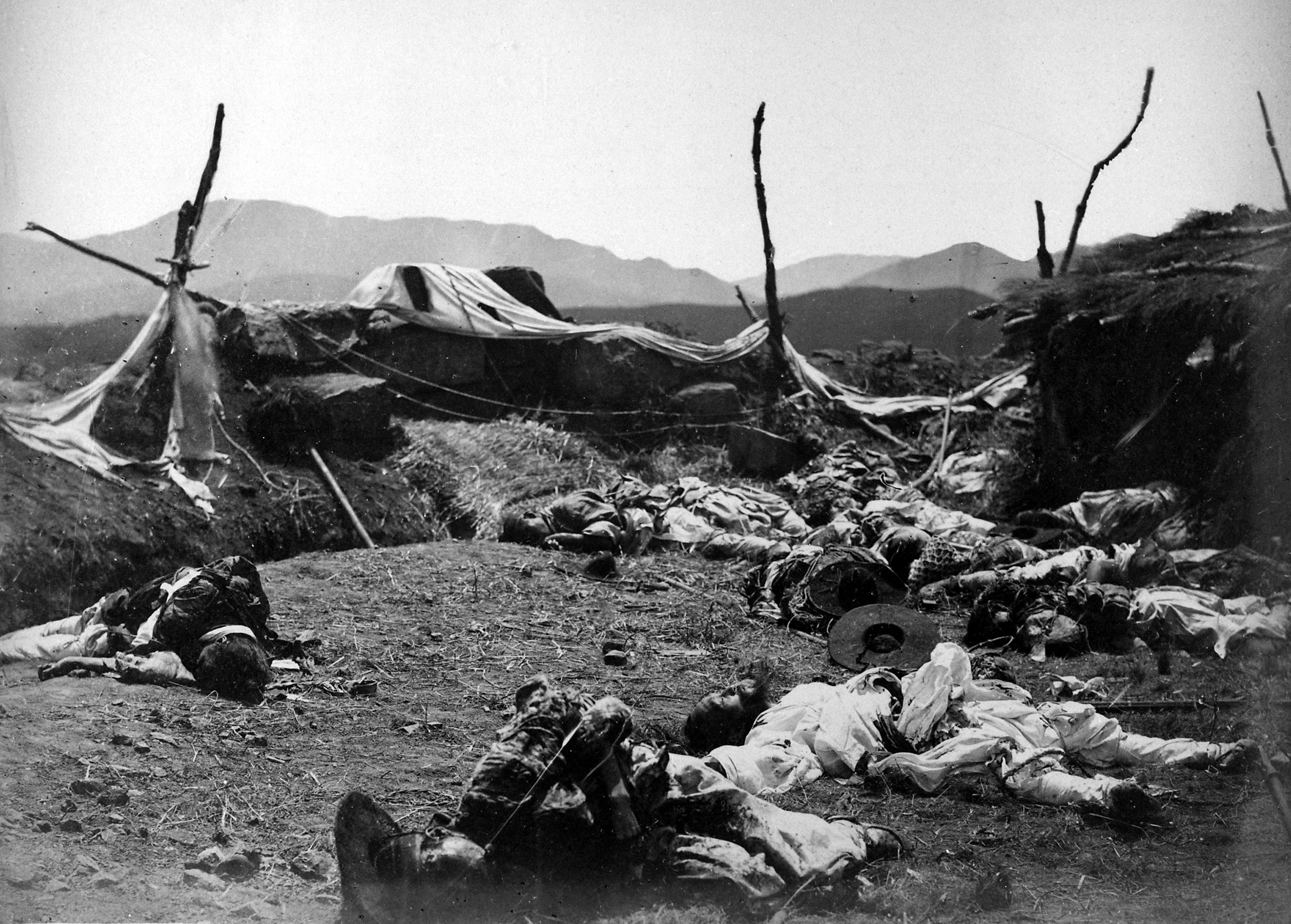
Korean casualties of the American punitive expedition (1871)

In August 1866, an armed American merchant ship named General Sherman illegally sailed up to Pyongyang, ignored orders to leave, and attacked local vessels and people. In response, the ship was burned and its crew killed. This resulted in an 1871 American punitive expedition, which also aimed to force a favorable trade relationship. Despite numerous Korean casualties and captives, the Korean government refused to negotiate, and the Americans left without concessions.

=== Opening of Korea ===
In 1876, Korea was finally opened by Japan in the Ganghwa Island incident, and forced to sign an unequal treaty. In 1880, Kim Hong-jip was sent as head of Korea's second diplomatic mission to Japan since the opening. He returned with a text written by Chinese diplomat Huang Zunxian called "A Strategy for Korea" (Chinese: 朝鮮策略; pinyin: Cháoxiǎn cèlüè; Korean: 조선책략). The text warned of the threat posed by the encroaching Russian Empire and suggested Korea create alliances with Japan and the West. Joseon King Gojong adopted this text as his foreign policy strategy, and began establishing diplomatic ties with the United States. The product of this was the Joseon–United States Treaty of 1882, which established ties between the two countries.

== Preparation ==
American Lucius Foote was appointed envoy extraordinary and minister plenipotentiary to Korea, and stationed in Seoul. Foote opened an American legation in Korea. Understanding that the Korean government would have then found opening a reciprocal Korean legation in the United States to be too expensive, he proposed in June 1883 that a special diplomatic mission be sent instead. After a discussion with his ministers the following day, Gojong agreed to the proposal. According to scholar Andrew C. Nahm, politician Kim Okkyun played a significant role in convincing Gojong to approve the mission. Kim was also friends with the people who would go on to lead the mission.

=== Purpose ===
Although Gojong did not officially state this, it is believed that a goal of the mission was to emphasize Korea's political independence from Qing. Since the 1882 Korea–U.S. treaty, Qing had been pushing to maintain its suzerainty over Joseon. This was exemplified in Qing's unusual direct intervention in the 1882 Imo Incident. Another goal was to have America send advisors directly to Korea, which was seen as circumventing Qing, as well as providing knowledge for reforming the country.

== Traveling to America ==
Foote arranged for American Rear Admiral Peirce Crosby to transport the mission from Chemulpo (now Incheon) to Nagasaki on board the USS Monocacy. (Note: The ship had actually been one of the ones involved in the 1871 American expedition to Korea.) After ceremonially seeking Gojong's leave (Note: Called sapye (사폐; 辭陛); done by envoys to the monarch before a long international journey.) on June 11, they boarded the ship and departed on July 16, 1883. They arrived in Nagasaki on July 21. Although arrangements existed for the next trip to Yokohama, the Koreans made their own way there.

=== Members of the mission ===
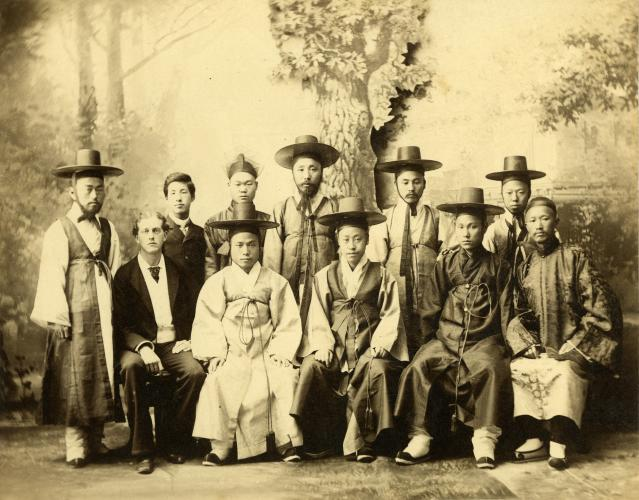
Members of the mission. From left, top row: Hyŏn, Miyaoka, Yu, Ch'oe, Ko, Pyŏn. Bottom row: Lowell, Hong, Min, Soh, Wu. (1883)

Member	Position on mission	Notes
Min Yongik	Plenipotentiary	Nephew of Gojong's primary consort Queen Min. As a young member of the prominent Yeoheung Min clan, it was hoped by the reformists in the Korean government that he would become a progressive reformer after the mission.
Hong Yŏngsik	Deputy minister	Vice president of the Foreign Office and previously secretary to Kim's 1880 mission to Japan.
Soh Kwang-pom	Secretary	Visited Japan in 1875.
Yu Kil-chun	Attaché	First Korean to study abroad, which he did in Japan in 1880.
Ch'oe Kyŏngsik (최경석; 崔景錫)	Military officer	Minor member of the mission.
Pyŏn Su	Attaché	Minor member of the mission.
Ko Yŏngch'ŏl (고영철; 高泳詰)	Attaché	Minor member of the mission.
Hyŏn Hŭngt'aek	Military officer	Minor member of the mission.
Wu Litang (吳禮堂)	Chinese interpreter	
Percival Lowell	Foreign secretary	While in Japan, the American legation in Tokyo arranged for Lowell to join the mission, which the Koreans accepted.
Miyaoka Tsunejiro (宮岡恒次郎)	Japanese interpreter	Lowell's assistant.

Two translators were present on the mission, one for Chinese and one for Japanese. Much of the translation on the mission was done from English to Japanese or Chinese to Korean, and vice versa, although some members of the mission reportedly learned rudimentary English during the journey.

They then boarded the SS Arabic on August 18. Throughout their travels, they were objects of much curiosity, as their dress and mannerisms immediately stuck out.

== Travels in America ==
=== San Francisco ===
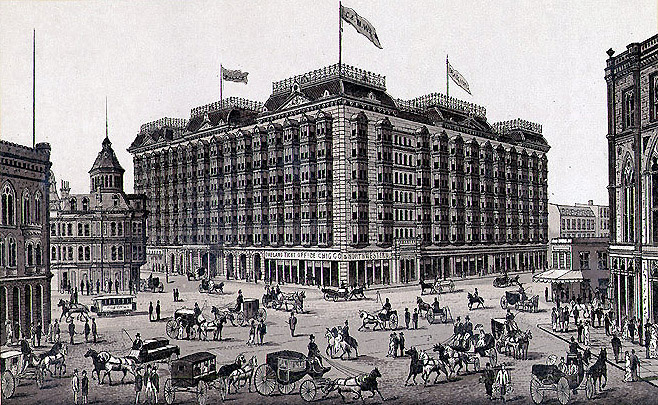
An 1887 engraving of the Palace Hotel

They arrived in San Francisco, California, on September 2, 1883, and were hosted by Major General John Schofield. They stayed at the Palace Hotel. (Note: They reportedly were terrified of riding the elevator in the hotel.) At 10 a.m. on the 4th, a reception was held by Mayor Washington Bartlett for the mission. There, they spoke with various trade officials and made verbal agreements to forward Korea–U.S. trade in the future. In the afternoon, they were given a tour of the Cliff House and Golden Gate Park. The following day, Schofield took them to the Presidio. (Note: Min was allowed to fire a cannon at the Presidio.)

=== Journey to Washington D.C. ===
After exchanging thanks and goodbyes, they left on the 7th via the transcontinental railroad. While on the train, they marveled at the passing landscape and spoke with other passengers. In one notable instance, they met with John Goucher, namesake of Goucher College, who developed an interest in Korea. Upon hearing that Christianity had not been adopted there, he suggested to Japan-based missionary Robert Samuel Maclay that Maclay go to Korea. Maclay would later do this in June 1884, making him the first Protestant missionary to visit.

They made their way to Sacramento that day, then through Ogden, Utah and Omaha, Nebraska. In Omaha, they were greeted by a Colonel Gregory, on behalf of Lieutenant General Philip Sheridan. Gregory joined the mission on their trip across the country. The mission arrived at Chicago on September 12, and stayed at The Palmer House. They departed Chicago on the 13th, and continued on their trip to Washington D.C., via Cleveland, Ohio and Pittsburgh, Pennsylvania.

They arrived in Washington D.C. on the 15th. They were greeted by Bancroft Davis, George Clayton Foulk, and Theodorus B. M. Mason, and put up in the Arlington Hotel. Foulk and Mason served as escorts for the mission there. (Note: Initially, Admiral Robert Shufeldt was considered for the position, but he declined it. Foulk was an ensign who volunteered for the assignment.) They met with various U.S. and foreign dignitaries and did some quick sightseeing. As President Chester A. Arthur and Secretary of State Frederick T. Frelinghuysen were in New York City, New York, they began making their way there. They boarded a train bound for Jersey City on the 17th. They took a boat there and crossed the Hudson River, then took a horse-drawn carriage to their destination.

=== New York City and Boston ===
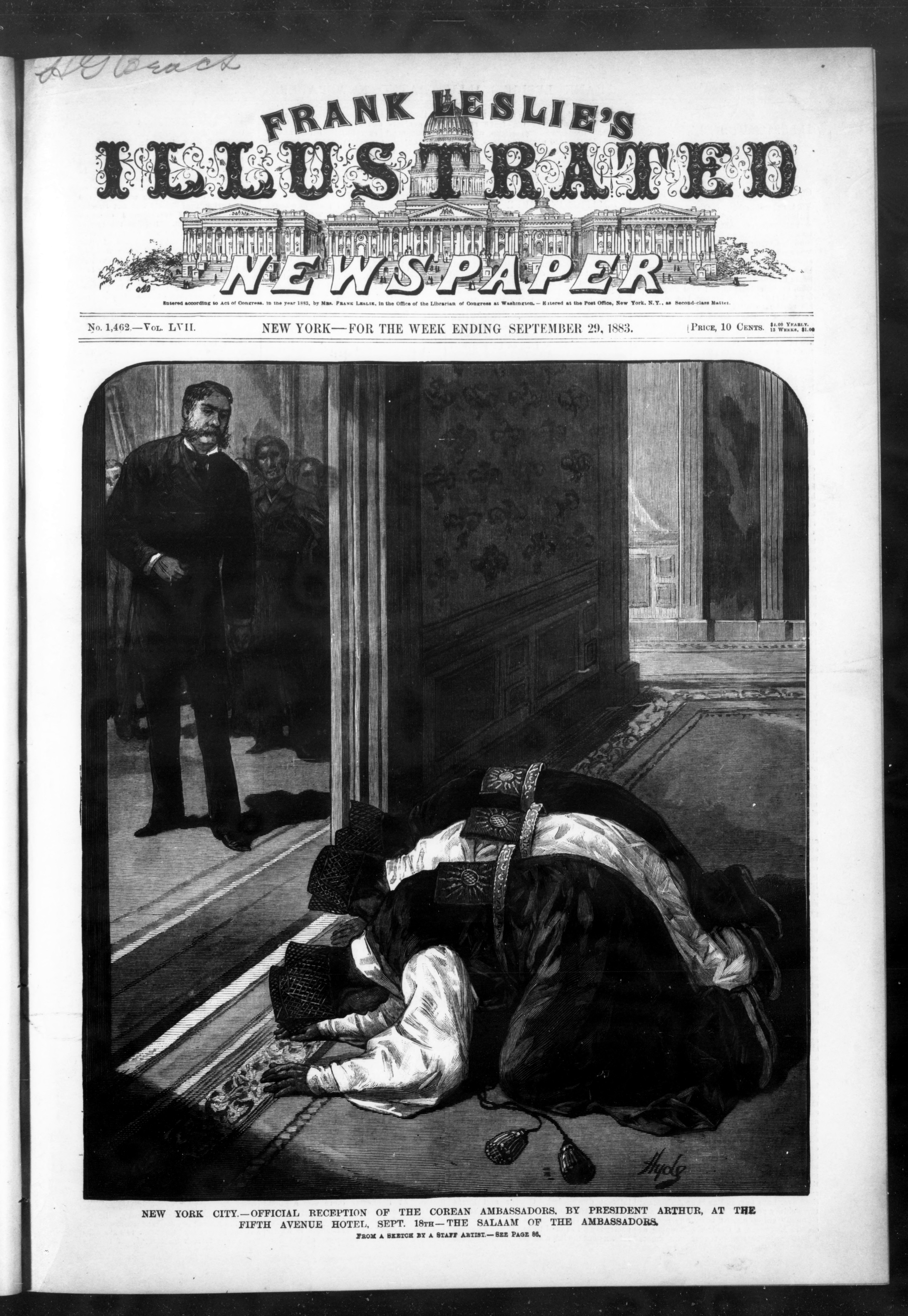
A sketch of the Korean mission kowtowing to President Arthur in the Fifth Avenue Hotel during their September 18 meeting, depicted in the September 29, 1883 issue of Frank Leslie's Illustrated Newspaper.

In New York City, the main members of the mission stayed the night at the Fifth Avenue Hotel, where the president and secretary of state were also staying. (Note: The other members stayed at the Hotel Vendome, some 20 blocks away.) They were presented to the president on the first floor of the hotel at 11 a.m. the following morning. (Note: They wore the traditional diplomatic formal attire samogwandae (사모관대; 紗帽冠帶), with red and blue sleeves for the meeting. The mission performed a kowtow to the president, which the president reciprocated by standing and bowing.) The meeting concluded within fifteen minutes. Shortly afterwards, they were given a tour around Central Park. Around 5:30 p.m., they departed for Boston, Massachusetts aboard the steamboat Bristol.

Around 6 a.m. on September 19, they arrived in Boston. They were hosted by Charles B. Norton and J. W. Wolcott, and stayed at Wolcott's Hotel Vendome. They visited the Foreign Exhibition, Manufacturers' Institute, and Corey Hill. They reportedly displayed some Korean handicrafts at the Foreign Exhibition (porcelain and clothing). On the 20th, Wolcott took the mission to his model farm, which particularly impressed them, leading them to later create the first model farm in Korea after their return. In the evening, they saw a production of Jalma at The Boston Theatre. On the 21st, they visited various factories in Lowell, Massachusetts. On the morning of the 22nd, they met the Governor of Massachusetts Benjamin Butler and a representative of the mayor. They rested at Percival Lowell's house for two days afterwards.

On September 24, they returned to New York City and again stayed at the Fifth Avenue Hotel. They were escorted by Mayor Franklin Edson on a grand tour of New York City. They first went to the Brooklyn Navy Yard, where they were given a fifteen gun salute from the USS Colorado (the ship that had led the 1871 American punitive expedition to Korea). In the afternoon, they were given a tour of industries in Brooklyn. On the 25th, they met with various business leaders. Notably, they met Everett Frazar, who would go on to have a role in setting up the first electric grid in Korea. They also visited New York Hospital, where they were impressed by the pediatric medicine. They visited the Western Union Telegraph Building, (Note: They were reportedly amazed and amused by the pneumatic tube mail system employed in the building. They were later shown the telegraph office but were reportedly less impressed.) post office, office of the New York Herald, and Tiffany & Co. jewelry store. On either this day or the previous, they watched a performance of Excelsior at Niblo's Theater.

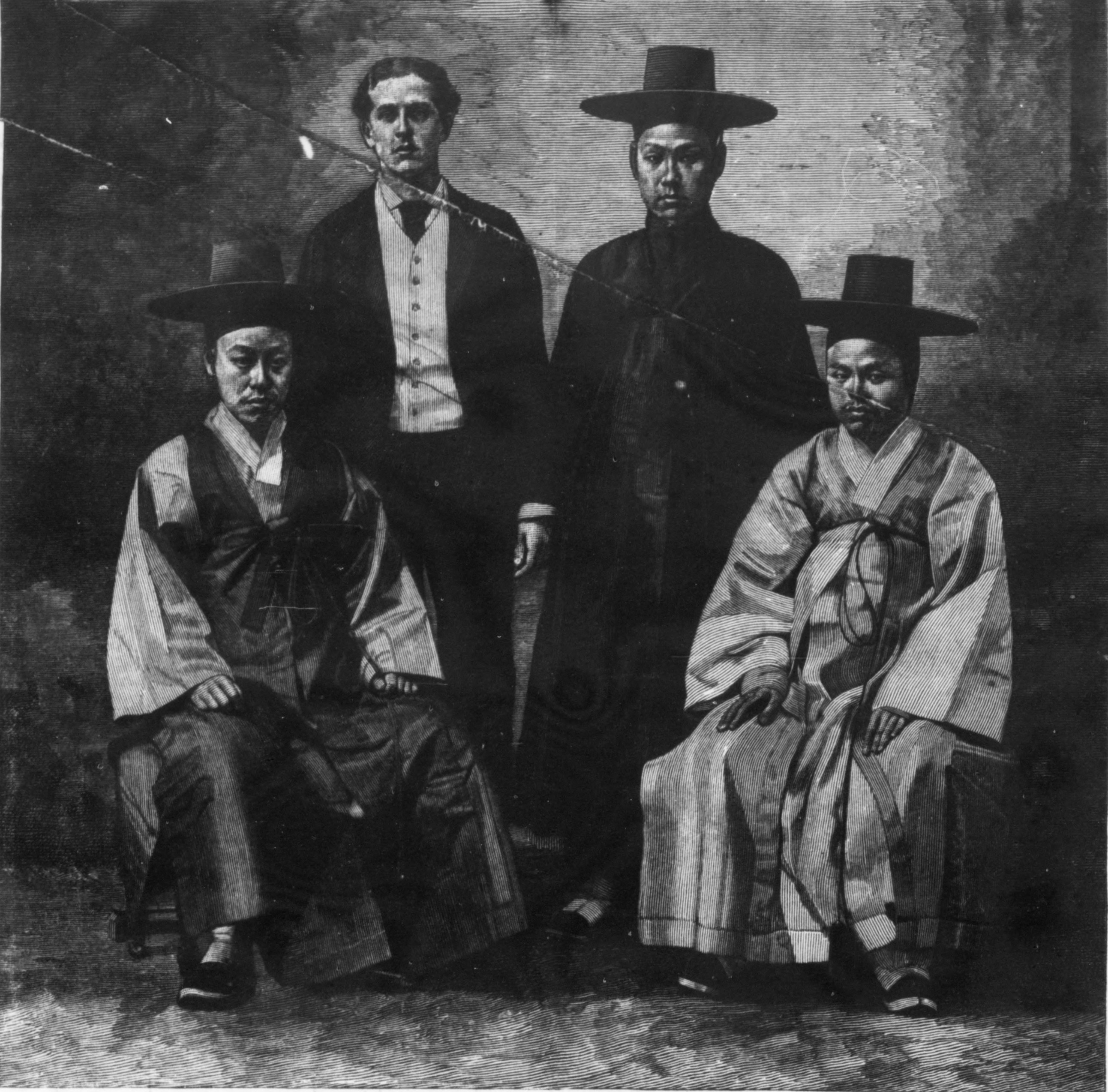
A sketch of a photo of part of the mission, from the September 29, 1883 Frank Leslie's Illustrated Newspaper

On September 26, they visited a photography studio and took a group picture. They then went to a reception at Governors Island. After visiting Fort Jay on the island, (Note: Here, Min was again allowed to fire a cannon.) they viewed grain elevators, and attended a performance of Prinz Methusalem along with the mayor. On the 27th, they visited various stores, the New York City Fire Department headquarters and several newspaper headquarters. In the evening, they boarded carriages bound for the United States Military Academy in West Point. They arrived the following day and were given a tour. Around noon, they boarded the USS Despatch and returned to Washington D.C. on the 29th.

=== Washington D.C. ===
In Washington D.C., they stayed again at the Arlington Hotel. From around this point, they made a point to take stock of their trip. For the first half of each day, they would be given tours, and in the evenings they gathered to discuss what reforms they wanted for Korea. Meanwhile, they asked for an American advisor to be stationed in Korea. They asked for Shufeldt, who tentatively accepted the position pending his retirement in February 1884. They also asked for military advisors, school teachers, and agricultural advisors. The Department of State agreed to make an effort to arrange for these (although Walter et al. note write that much of their requests did not bear fruit). They also visited the Office of Education to learn how America's education system worked, as well as the Department of the Treasury for information on paper money. They then visited the Department of Agriculture, and received a collection of seeds that were thought suitable for growing in Korea. The mission also successfully requested that Foulk join them on their return to Korea. (Note: This request was perhaps made at Foulk's behest, as Foulk had grown up in East Asia and wanted to eventually go back to Japan.)

On October 13, the Korean mission formally visited the president in the White House.

== End and return to Korea ==
The White House helped plan their return trip to Korea. An offer was made for three members to travel with the USS Trenton via the Suez Canal back to Korea, while the rest would go back to San Francisco and board a ship there. Min asked to go to Europe with Soh, Pyŏn, and Foulk. On October 16, the remaining members of the mission left with Lowell to San Francisco. There, they purchased horses and cattle as breeding stock for Korea. On October 24, they boarded the SS City of Rio de Janeiro and arrived in Seoul in December. Hong gave a report of his travels on December 21. (Note: Report called 『홍영식복명문답기』; 『洪英植復命問答記』)

Min and the others arrived in New York City on November 6, (Note: In New York, they announced a U.S.-backed plan to hold an exhibition of Korean goods in Seoul in Spring 1884, but this never came to pass.) and stayed at the Hotel Victoria. They passed the time in New York by visiting factories for electric lights and silk. They also reportedly spent much time for personal shopping. Instead of joining the rest of the mission bound for Europe, Yu elected to stay in the United States to study, for an intended period of five years. The first Korean student to study abroad and in Japan, he also became the first to study in the United States.

The Trenton departed from New York on November 16 or December 1, and they arrived on January 12, 1884, in Marseille, France. They made their way to Paris, then to London, United Kingdom. They were given a tour of London's palaces and museums. They then returned to Paris for a week, then boarded a ship on January 25 at Marseille, bound for Rome, where they spent two days. They were reportedly less-impressed by Europe than they were by the United States. They then spent four days in Cairo, Egypt, three in Aden, thirteen in India, five in Ceylon, five in Singapore, and nine in Hong Kong. They finally made their way to Nagasaki before returning to Incheon.

== Aftermath ==
After the group that returned via San Francisco arrived, they were given government resources to implement the ideas they had brought back. Hong was made an official of Pyongan Province and was eventually assigned to found a postal system in April 1884. Ch'oe was granted a plot of land to plant the seeds the mission had received. He did so, and distributed the next generation of seeds around the country, before his death from natural causes in 1886. Afterwards, little came of his agricultural reform efforts.

Min's group arrived in June 1884. Min reportedly told Foote of his trip, "I was born into darkness, entered the light, and have now returned to the darkness". (Note: 『나는 암흑세계에서 태어나서 광명세계로 들어갔다가 이제 또다시 암흑세계로 되돌아왔다』) They were given a variety of posts reflecting their experience. They waited for Shufeldt's arrival as Korea's advisor, but learned in November that Shufeldt had reneged on going.

Most of former mission members quickly became embroiled in the country's internal conflicts, with Hong and the others joining the reformist Gaehwa Party. Min ended up being relatively conservative, and pushed back against their efforts. In December, that party launched the Gapsin Coup. Min was badly injured in the fighting, while Hong, Soh, and Pyŏn were granted positions in the revolutionary government that took over. After the odds turned against the plotters, Hong was killed and the others fled to Japan. (Note: Soh and Pyŏn then went to the United States, where Pyŏn was killed in 1891 in a railroad accident while working for the United States Department of Agriculture. Soh briefly returned to Korea and was made Minister of Justice, but then absconded with legation funds to Washington D.C., where he eventually died in 1897.) Min's injury prevented him from doing significant work. He spent most of the rest of his remaining life in China until his death in 1914.

Yu cut his study-abroad trip short upon hearing of the coup, and returned to Korea in 1885, via Europe. He was suspected of being a pro-Japanese influence, and put under house arrest. He was eventually released in 1892 due to his faithful service while under arrest. He was appointed to various positions, until he became the Minister of the Interior in October 1895. After Gojong went into his internal exile in the Russian legation, Yu fled to Japan and stayed until 1907. He died in 1914.

== Analysis ==
A number of scholars argue that the mission did not immediately impact Korea's reform. Korea possibly improved its image, but the Americans either reneged or acted slowly on their promises. Advisors were only sent years later. Importantly, the events immediately after the mission, in particular the Gapsin Coup, likely hampered many of the benefits the mission might have yielded. As a result, the mission had little impact on the future of Korea.

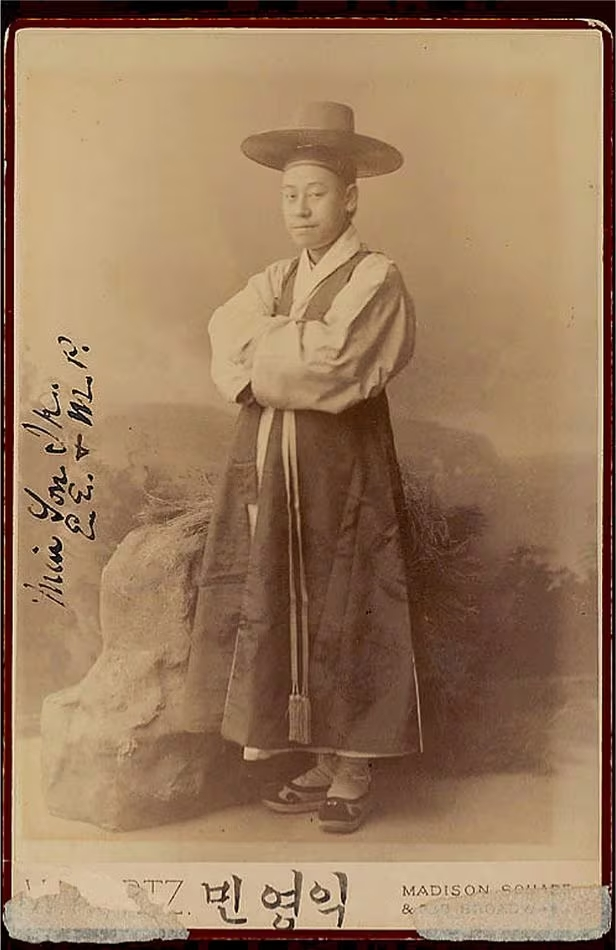
Min, photographed in New York City (1883)

Why Min's and Hong's groups went separately back to Korea has been analyzed. Hong advocated for independence from Qing, and Min opposed it. According to Yu's testimony, their disagreement on this issue was reportedly visible during their stay in Washington, which potentially led to their separate return home.

Min's conservative leaning after the trip has also been analyzed. While he initially verbally advocated for some reform, he reportedly carried and read mostly traditional Confucian texts throughout the journey. By contrast, Pyŏn and Soh reportedly enthusiastically took notes on everything they observed. While traveling up to Seoul upon their return, Soh reportedly told Foulk that he believed Min would turn back to conservatism.

== See also ==
- Joseon diplomacy
- Joseon missions to China
- Joseon missions to Japan
- South Korea–United States relations
