= Yu Kilchun =

Korean independence activist (1856–1914)

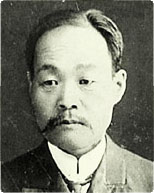
- Born: November 21, 1856; Gye-dong, Bokcheon, Hanseong, Joseon
- Died: September 30, 1914 (aged 57); Keijō, Korea, Empire of Japan
- Resting place: San 1-16, Changu-dong, Hanam, South Korea
- Awards: Order of the Taegeuk, 1st class

Korean name
- Hangul: 유길준
- Hanja: 兪吉濬
- RR: Yu Giljun
- MR: Yu Kilchun

Art name
- Hangul: 구당, 천민, 구일
- Hanja: 矩堂, 天民, 矩一
- RR: Gudang, Cheonmin, Guil
- MR: Kudang, Ch'ŏnmin, Kuil

Courtesy name
- Hangul: 성무
- Hanja: 聖武
- RR: Seongmu
- MR: Sŏngmu

Yu Kilchun (Korean: 유길준; November 21, 1856 – September 30, 1914) was a Korean politician. Yu lived during the last few decades of Joseon and the Korean Empire, before the occupation of the peninsula by Japan. As a young man, he studied the Chinese classics. Unusually for the time, he came to embrace foreign ideas and literature.

Yu achieved a number of notable firsts: in 1883, he was among the first Koreans to visit the United States. He was also the first Korean to study abroad in Japan and the first in the United States. He also wrote some of the earliest books and translations on Western topics in contemporary Korean, which significantly impacted the reform movement in the Korean Empire. He is also remembered for his contributions to Korean linguistics.

Yu was among the earliest Korean independence activists and reformers. He proposed numerous changes to modernize the Korean government, including the establishment of a constitutional monarchy and increased popular participation in government. This brought him into conflict with the Korean monarchy, who forced him to flee to Japan. There, he orchestrated a coup against the Korean monarchy that failed. By the time he was eventually pardoned and allowed to return to the peninsula, it was already firmly under Japanese influence. He fell into a depression and died several years after the formal beginning of the occupation of Korea.

Yu is now remembered as a chinilpa or collaborator with Japan. In the aftermath of the assassination of Empress Myeongseong, he was named one of the Eulmi Four Traitors that assisted in her death.

== Early life and education ==
Yu was born on November 21, 1856, in Seoul, Joseon. He is of the Gigye Yu clan. He was born the second son of Yu Jin-su and his second wife, Lady Yi of the Chungju Yi clan.

At an early age, he learned the Chinese classics from his father and his maternal grandfather, Yi Gyeong-jik. In 1870, at age fourteen, Yu joined the circle of Park Gyu-su who was also a trusted friend of the late Crown Prince Hyomyeong, a leading scholar of Bukhak (북학; 北學; lit. 'northern studies'), a school within the Silhak social reform movement. The movement advocated for learning from abroad in order to reform the country, which was an unconventional idea in Joseon at the time. He quickly adopted an interest in reading foreign books.

== Studying abroad in Japan and America ==
In 1881, he was sent to Japan as an attendant of a Joseon foreign mission. While there, he was allowed to remain in Japan and study abroad for a year at the Keiō School (later "Keiō University"). This made him the first Korean exchange student to Japan. When the Imo Incident occurred in 1882, Min Yeong-ik recommended that Yu return to Korea, which he did in January 1883.

Yu was among the first Koreans to ever set foot in North America. In July 1883, Yu traveled as an attendant to Min as part of the first-ever Korean special mission to the United States. While there, he again remained to study abroad. He stayed for around a year and a half thanks to the patronage of the American zoologist Edward S. Morse, whom he had previously met while in Japan. In Fall 1884, he enrolled in the Governor Dummer Academy (now known as The Governors Academy) in Byfield, Massachusetts. This also made him the first Korean to study abroad in the United States. However, his studies were once again halted due to another incident in his home country: the Gapsin Coup. He halted his studies in December 1884, and returned to Korea via Europe. He stopped by a number of major European countries along the way.

== Return to Korea ==
However, upon his return to Korea, he was viewed with suspicion due to his association with members of the pro-reform Gaehwa Party. Yu was then arrested. With the assistance of Han Kyu-seol, Yu was eventually able to escape a verdict of capital punishment, and was allowed to serve his sentence at Han's house until 1892.

While in detention, Yu wrote a book on his experiences entitled Observations on Travels in the West (서유견문; 西遊見聞; Seoyu Gyeonmun) and published it in 1895. The book is nearly 600 pages long, and is written in a mix of hangul and hanja, and introduces Western civilization to Korean audiences. It advocates for a number of reforms, including the establishment of a constitutional monarchy, military reforms, international trade, and a modern currency and tax system. It also discussed ideas such as the social contract. These ideas later became a significant inspiration for the Gabo Reform.

At the end of the Donghak Peasant Revolution and the First Sino-Japanese War that followed, Yu worked in the government as part of a pro-Japanese faction. From 1894 to 1895, Yu worked for the government under Prime Minister Kim Hong-jip, who intended to modernize Korea. In 1895, he became Vice Minister of State for the Home Office.

In 1895, he published the first Korean dictionary and grammar book. (Note: 조선문전; 朝鮮文典; Chosŏn munjŏn)

In October 1895, he was labeled by King Gojong as one of the 'Eulmi Four Traitors' for collaborating with Imperial Japan leading up to the assassination of Empress Myeongseong. Following the assassination, Yu contacted Inoue Kaoru, the Japanese Minister for Foreign Affairs, to discuss the incident. In February 1896, during Gojong's internal exile to the Russian legation, the pro-Japanese faction collapsed, and Yu fled to Japan. Yu and a group of young Korean graduates of the Imperial Japanese Army Academy attempted to execute a coup d'état against the Korean government, but the attempt failed. This sparked a diplomatic row between the two countries, and Yu was subsequently imprisoned on the Ogasawara Islands. Yu was eventually allowed to return to Korea in 1907, when Gojong was dethroned. Yu then served as the vice chair of the Young Korean Academy.

In 1909, Yu wrote and published a book on Korean grammar. (Note: 『대한문전』; 『大韓文典』)

== Later life and death ==
When Korea was annexed by Imperial Japan in 1910, Yu opposed the annexation. He declined the Danshaku title he was awarded by the Japanese government. (Note: The title was created by the government as part of its new Korean peerage system and designed after its own British-modeled Kazoku system.) He then fell into a depression.

On September 30, 1914, he died from complications of a kidney disease.

== Legacy and honors ==
In 1910, Yu received a Order of the Taegeuk, 1st class from the Korean Empire.

In 2003, the Peabody Essex Museum in Salem, Massachusetts, had an exhibit dedicated to Yu installed.

== Works ==
All five of Yu's books were republished in 1971.

- Seoyu gyeonmun (서유견문; 西遊見聞)

Yu also published a number of translations of foreign books, including histories of the Seven Years' War, the Crimean War, and the rise and fall of Poland.

== Family ==
- Father
  - Yu Chinsu (유진수; 兪鎭壽; 1825–1898)
- Mother
  - Lady Yi of the Hansan Yi clan (정부인 한산 이씨; 韓山 李氏; 1824–1900)
- Sibling(s)
  - Older brother – Yu Hoejun (유회준; 兪會濬; 1847 – ?)
  - Younger brother – Yu Sŏngjun (유성준; 兪星濬; 1859/1860 – 27 February 1934)
- Wives and their issues
  - Lady Kim of the Gyeongju Kim clan (경주 김씨; 慶州 金氏; ? – 1874) – No issue.
  - Lady Yi of the Chungju Yi clan (충주 이씨; 忠州 李氏); daughter of Yi Kyŏngjik (이경직; 李敬稙)
    - Son – Yu Man'gyŏm (유만겸; 兪萬兼; 13 July 1889 – 13 December 1944)
    - Son – Yu Ŏkkyŏm (유억겸; 兪億兼; 23 October 1896 – 8 November 1947)
