= Hong Jong-u =

Korean politician (1850–1913)

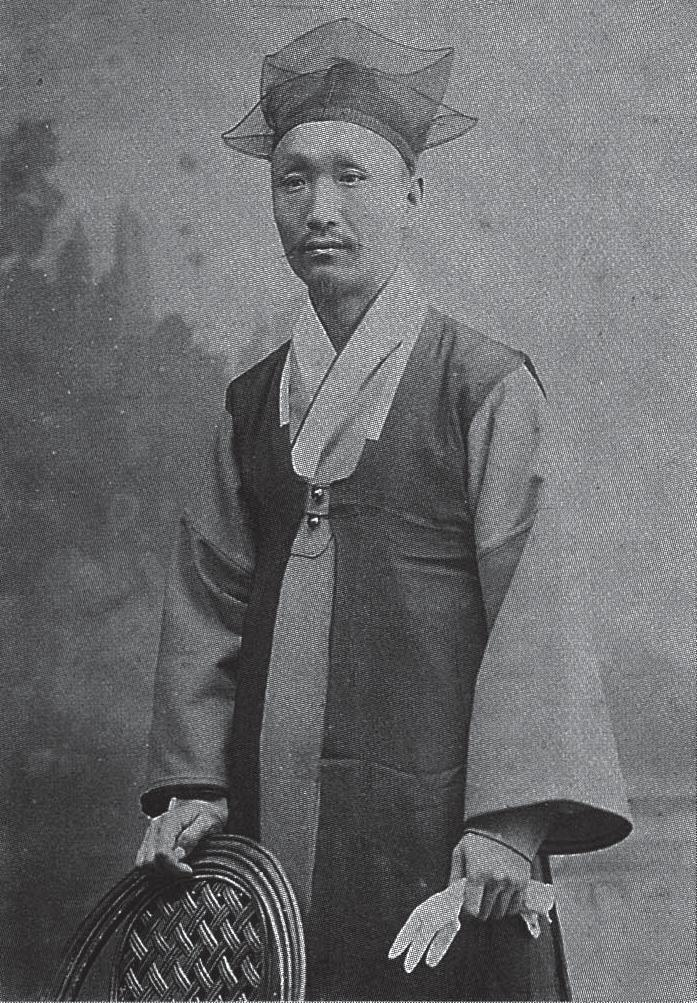
- Hong Tjyong-ou in Paris
- Born: November 17, 1851; Ansan, Joseon
- Died: January 2, 1913; Incheon or Mokpo, Korea, Empire of Japan
- Relatives: See Namyang Hong clan

- Hong Jong-u
- Hangul: 홍종우
- Hanja: 洪鍾宇
- RR: Hong Jongu
- MR: Hong Chongu

Hong Jong-u (Korean: 홍종우; Hanja: 洪鍾宇, 1850–1913) was a Korean assassin, reformer, activist and statesman during the Korean Empire. He assassinated Kim Okkyun in Shanghai in 1894.

== Biography ==
Hong Jong-u was born in Ansan circa 1850. His father died in 1886. Afterwards Hong decided to study in France as the first Korean exchange student in France. He arrived in Paris in December 1890. In Paris the 40-year-old student worked at the Guimet Museum, where he translated the Chunhyangjeon, The Tale of Sim Chong, and the Jikseong haengnyeong pyeonram (직성행녕편람; a Korean fortune-telling book) into French.

In 1893, Hong traveled to Japan where he decided to assassinate Kim Okkyun and Pak Yeong-hyo, two reform-minded Koreans. In 1894, he shot and killed Kim Okkyun aboard ship en route to Shanghai. He later returned to Korea where he was appointed to high office. With the growing influence of Japan over Korean affairs, the anti-Japan Hong Jong-u resigned his official position. He died in 1913.

== See also ==
- Kapsin Coup
- Yun Chi-ho
