= Ryu Hyeok-ro =

Korean official (1855–1940)

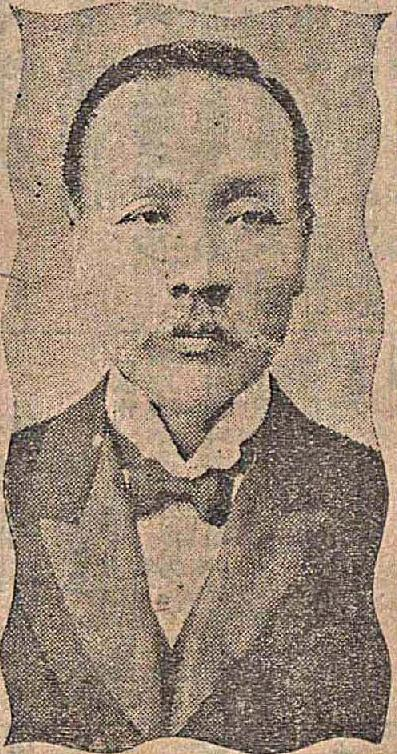

Director of Artillery Section
- Monarch: Gojong
- Preceded by: Established
- Succeeded by: Yi Byeong-wo

Personal details
- Born: March 9, 1851 Hongju, South Chungcheong Province, Joseon Dynasty
- Died: May 15, 1945 (aged 94) Korea under Japanese rule
- Profession: Official, and Officer

Military service
- Allegiance: Korean Empire
- Branch/service: Imperial Korean Army
- Years of service: 1894-1907
- Rank: Lieutenant Colonel

- Ryu Hyeok-ro
- Hangul: 유혁로
- Hanja: 柳赫魯
- RR: Yu Hyeokro
- MR: Yu Hyŏngno

Ryu Hyeok-ro (Korean: 유혁로; Hanja: 柳赫魯; March 9, 1851 – May 15, 1945) was a Korean officer during the age of Late Joseon Dynasty, and Korea under Japanese rule.

== Life ==
Being born as a child of a soldier of Joseon Dynasty, Ryu passed the military civil service examination in 1876. As a result of Kim Ok-gyun's actions, Ryu and his father started to assimilate to the Gaewha ideologies. In 1882, Ryu visited Japan as a Aide-de-camp to Park Yung-hyo with Bak Jungyang, Cho Byeong-jik, O Yun-jung, etc. Opposing the Qing intervention to Korea, Ryu participated in the Gapsin Coup. He played the role of reconnaissance, and communications between the members of the Coup. When the coup was suppressed by the Qing forces in Korea, Ryu fled to Japan with Kim Ok-gyun. During his years in Japan, Ryu used Japanese name, Yamada Yuichi (山田唯一). He returned to Korea in 1894 with Park Yung-hyo. In 1895, Ryu was promoted to Lieutenant Colonel and posted as the first Director of Artillery of Ministry of Military, with the support of Park Yung-hyo. He participated in the Independence Club, and People's joint association. However, as a Pro-Russian cabinet was established in Korea, Ryu again fled to Japan. In Japan, Ryu had a great interest in military, and military technologies.

In 1907, Ryu returned to Korea with some of the survivors of the Gapsin Coup in 1884, and was appointed as officer at West North Young-Rim-chang. In December, Ryu was appointed as the Governor of North Pyongan Province by recommendation of Resident General Itō Hirobumi. In 1908, he joined a Pro-Japanese organization, Daedong Hak-hui.

After the annexation of Korea, Ryu was appointed as Chamyeogwan of the Gyeonggi Province. From 1914 to March 1916, Ryu, as a colonial official for Japan, participated in the Land reform of Terauchi Masatake. Then, in March 1916, Ryu was appointed as the governor of the North Chungcheong Province. In June 1917, Ryu retired from his positions in the government. He started a new life as a businessman. In 1921, Ryu was elected as a member of Junchuwon, and remained his position until 1940. From 1926, Ryu became a member of Dong Min Hui, which tried to suppress the Socialist Independence movements.

After his death, the South Korean government defined Ryu as one of the Chinilpas.
