= Sŏ Kwangbŏm =

Korean politician (1859–1897)

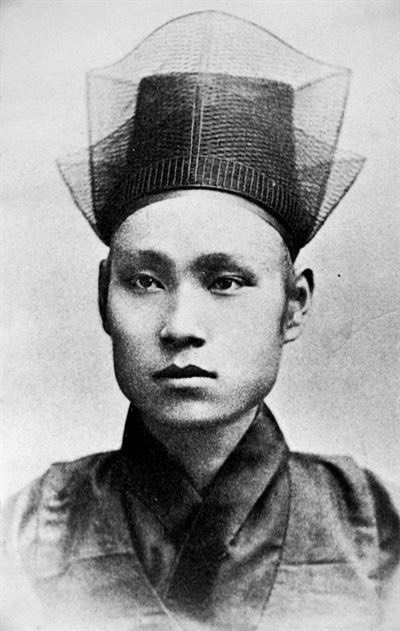

Korean name
- Hangul: 서광범
- Hanja: 徐光範
- RR: Seo Gwangbeom
- MR: Sŏ Kwangbŏm

Sŏ Kwangbŏm (Korean: 서광범; Hanja: 徐光範; 8 November 1859 – 17 July 1897) was a Korean reformist and politician of Korea's late Joseon.

== Biography ==
Sŏ Kwangbŏm or known by his English name: Kennedy (or Kenneth) Sŏ, was born into the Daegu Seo clan. Sŏ married Lady Kim of the Shin Andong Kim clan when he was a young boy, but Lady Kim had died at a young age to which led him to marry again and then a third time. He was close to his late first wife's relative, Kim Ok-gyun, who brought enlightenment and thoughts to him when he was young. Sŏ later became close with Park Yeong-hyo, Park Chan-ju's grandfather (the wife of Prince Yi U).

Sŏ Kwangbŏm was born into an aristocratic family of Korea and rose quickly through the political ranks. In 1883, he joined the first ever Korean mission to the United States. Upon his return, he participated in the failed Gapsin Coup. He was forced into exile, and spent 10 years in the United States, working for a time as a messenger in the Bureau of Education making a very modest salary. He was recalled to Korea where he was named Minister of Justice, where he led several important reforms. He was then sent to London as the Korean envoy to the Jubilee before returning to Korea to become a privy councilor to the King of Korea. He was sent back to Washington as an envoy where he served as Minister.

He was the Minister of Justice, a Korean minister to the United States, an envoy to the Queen's Jubilee and a one-time political refugee and exile.

He died on 17 July 1897 in Washington, DC after an illness of a few days following his collapse after a bicycle ride. His remains were cremated.

== Family ==
- Father
  - Sŏ Sangik (서상익; 徐相翊; 1835–1884)
- Mother
  - Lady Pak of the Bannam Park clan (반남 박씨; 潘南 朴氏; 1835–?); daughter of Pak Chewan (박제완; 1800–?)
- Wives
  - Lady Kim of the (new) Andong Kim clan (신 안동 김씨; 1859–1874); daughter of Kim Pyŏngji (판서 김병지; 金炳地; 1830–1881)
  - Lady Kim of the Gwangsan Kim clan (광산 김씨; 1862–?)
  - Lady Pak of the Miryang Park clan (밀양 박씨; 1865–?); daughter of Pak Sŭnghŏn (박승헌; 朴承憲; 1840–?)
- Issue
  - Adoptive son - Sŏ Chaedŏk (서재덕; 徐載德); son of the Sŏ Kwangjŏng (서광정; 徐光鼎)
