= Yi Kyuwan =

Korean politician (1862–1946)

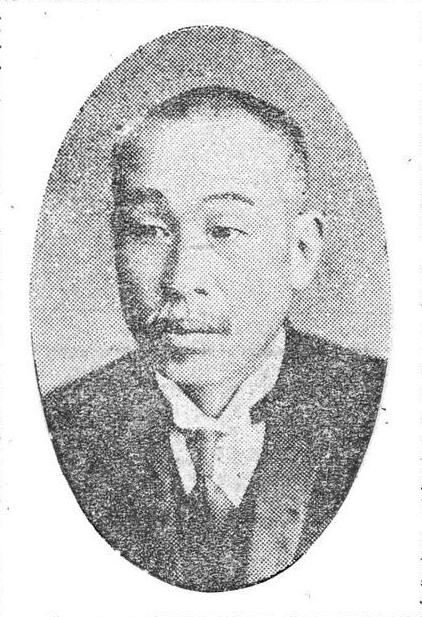
- Yi Kyuwan, 1930
- Born: November 15, 1862; Gwangju, Gyeonggi Province, Joseon
- Died: December 15, 1946 (aged 84)
- Other names: Japanese: Asada Ryo (아사다 료, 淺田良), Asada Ryoichi (아사다 료이치, 淺田良一)
- Occupations: politician, philosopher, revolutionist
- Known for: revolutionist during Korea's Joseon period
- Children: Lee Sun-kil (이선길;李鮮吉), judoka, Lee Young-il (이영일;李英一), painter and teacher

Yi Kyuwan (Korean: 이규완; Hanja: 李圭完; November 15, 1862 – December 15, 1946) was a politician, philosopher, and revolutionist during Korea's Joseon period. His Japanese names were Asada Ryo (Korean: 아사다 료; Hanja: 淺田良) and Asada Ryoichi (Korean: 아사다 료이치; Hanja: 淺田良一). In 1884, he was one of several military leaders in the brief Gapsin Coup, a Japanese-supported attempt to overthrow the royal palace in Seoul.

== Biography ==
Yi was born in Gwangju, Gyeonggi Province, Joseon. He had ancestry in the royal family of the Joseon dynasty, descending from Prince Limyoung, the fifth son of Sejong the Great. Yi had a somewhat distant relationship with his family; his father was in the process of moving to Seoul from Guangzhou, and worked as a woodcutter, while his mother died early on in his life, which led his father to remarry. In Yi's youth, he came under the influence of reformist politicians Park Young-hyo and Seo Jae-pil, who arranged for him study in Japan in 1883. In 1884 he returned to Korea and was appointed to a junior military post.

In December 1884, he was one military leader of the short-lived Gapsin coup. When the coup failed, Yi escaped to Yamaguchi, Japan. He spent a long time wandering throughout areas near the southeastern tip of Honshu, such as Yamaguchi, Shimonoseki, and Fukuoka. During most of his time in Japan, he was an employee of a silk factory and rice mill, owned by the Nakamura family. One member of the family, Nakamura Ichi, was a diplomat for the United States in Japan at that time. The owner of the silk factory eventually paired Yi and Nakamura Umeko (中村梅子), Nakamura's daughter, whom Yi married on July 15, 1896.

In 1894, he was pardoned and returned to Korea, but the next year he was identified as being involved in Park Young-hyo's coup d'état. Both escaped. On May 11, 1907, while staying in Japan, Kojong was appointed deputy director of the Northwestern forestry service office (서북영림창;西北營林廠). In July 1907, he was again pardoned and returned to Korea, at which time he was appointed Jungchuwon Buchanui. In 1908, he became the governor of Gangwon Province. In 1910 he was reappointed to the post under the Japanese General Government, In 1918, he became governor of South Hamgyong Province, but resigned seven years later. In his later years he was active in farming and wasteland reclamation, as well as charitable work. He placed importance upon diligence and thrift, expressing disdain for idleness and laziness. In particular, he extremely disliked unemployed, idle peoples.

== Family ==
Yi's first son, Lee Sun-kil (이선길;李鮮吉), was a judoka and educator in Korea. His other son, Lee Young-il (이영일;李英一) was a painter and middle school teacher.

== See also ==
- Gapsin coup
- Seo Jae-pil
- Park Young-hyo
- Yun Chi-ho
- Kim Ok-gyun
