= Susinsa girok =

19th-century Korean book

- Hangul: 수신사기록
- Hanja: 修信使記錄
- Revised Romanization: Susinsa girok
- McCune–Reischauer: Susinsa kirok

Susinsa girok (Korean: 수신사기록; Hanja: 修信使記錄), or sometimes simply Susinsa, is a collection of diaries and memoirs composed by members of the Korean goodwill delegations to Japan known as the Joseon Susinsa during the reign of King Gojong in the late 1870s and early 1880s, soon after Korea's opening to the outside world. The collection includes the Ildong kiyu (日東記游) and Susinsa ilgi (修信使日記) by Kim Gisu (金綺秀 1832-?), the Susinsa ilgi (修信使日記) by Kim Hong-jip (金弘集 1842-1896), and the Sahwa giryak (使和記略) by Bak Yeong-hyo (朴泳孝 1861-1939).

== See also ==
- Annals of the Joseon Dynasty (Joseon Wangjo Sillok)
- Seungjeongwon ilgi
- History of Korea
- Joseon Tongsinsa
