= Enlightenment Party =

19th-century political faction in Korea

The Enlightenment Party (Korean: 개화당; Hanja: 開化黨; RR: Gaehwadang), or the Enlightenment Faction (개화파; 開化派; Gaehwapa), was a liberal and progressive party in the Joseon dynastic state of Korea. It was also called the Independence Party, the Innovation Party, and the Reformist Faction.

== Description ==
The faction formed after the Imo Incident. Members wished to change Korea's submissive relationship to Qing China and were opposed to what they called the Sadae Party (사대당; 事大黨; Sadaedang), a group that supported Empress Myeongseong and the Qing dynasty. Leading scholars who visited Japan took inspiration from the Meiji Restoration in the Empire of Japan and reformed domestic affairs. The central figures of this party were Kim Ok-gyun, Hong Yeong-sik, Seo Jae-pil and Seo Gwang-bum. As the Conservative Party also participated in similar activities, the Enlightenment Party is also called the Radical Reformist Faction to distinguish between them.

The Enlightenment Party orchestrated the Gapsin Coup after the Sino–French War with the promise of advice and support of Takezoe Shinichiro, the Japanese minister to Korea. Ultimately, the coup d'état was crushed by the Qing army, so Enlightenment Party members, such as Kim Ok-gyun, Bak Yeonghyo, Seo Jae-pil, among others, sought asylum in Japan or the United States.

In 1894, the Japanese occupied Seoul restored King Gojong's father, Heungseon Daewongun, and established a pro-Japanese government under Kim Hong-jip and the Enlightenment Party's administration. They organized three cabinets; their politics were partially supported by the Japanese, indirectly resulting in them aiding and abetting Japan's influence. However, with the rise in popularity of the pro-Russian faction, the Enlightenment Party collapsed.

== See also ==
- Gapsin Coup
- Gabo Reform
- Kim Kyu-sik
- Syngman Rhee
- Yun Chi-ho
