= Kim Hong-jip =

Korean politician (1842–1896)

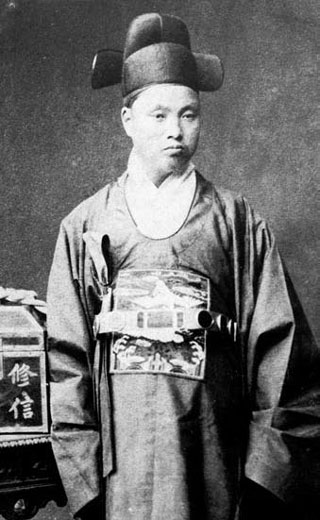

Prime Minister of Joseon
- In office August 24, 1895 – February 11, 1896
- Monarch: Gojong
- Preceded by: Park Jeong-yang
- Succeeded by: Kim Byeong-si
- In office August 15, 1894 – May 28, 1895
- Monarch: Gojong
- Preceded by: new position
- Succeeded by: Park Jeong-yang

Chief State Councillor
- In office June 25, 1894 – August 20, 1894
- Preceded by: Kim Byeong-si
- Succeeded by: position abolished

Left State Councillor
- In office December 13, 1887 – May 1, 1888
- Preceded by: Kim Byeong-si
- Succeeded by: Kim Byeong-si
- In office October 1886 – October 1886
- Preceded by: Kim Byeong-si
- Succeeded by: Kim Byeong-si
- In office October 21, 1884 – January 12, 1885
- Preceded by: Sim Sun-taek
- Succeeded by: Kim Byeong-deok

Right State Councillor
- In office December 7, 1884 – December 8, 1884
- Preceded by: Sim Sun-taek
- Succeeded by: Kim Byeong-deok

Personal details
- Born: 1842
- Died: February 11, 1896 (aged 53–54)

Korean name
- Hangul: 김홍집
- Hanja: 金弘集
- RR: Gim Hongjip
- MR: Kim Hongjip

Art name
- Hangul: 도원
- Hanja: 道園
- RR: Dowon
- MR: Towŏn

Courtesy name
- Hangul: 경능
- Hanja: 敬能
- RR: Gyeongneung
- MR: Kyŏngnŭng

Kim Hong-jip (Korean: 김홍집; Hanja: 金弘集; 1842 – February 11, 1896) was a Korean politician best known for his role as prime minister during the Kabo Reform period from 1895–1896. His name was originally Kim Goeng-jip (김굉집; 金宏集) which he later changed to Kim Hong-jip. His father, Kim Yeong-jak, served as mayor of Kaesŏng in the Joseon Dynasty.

In 1880, Kim undertook an official mission to Japan where he learned first-hand of the modernizing reforms taking place in that country and inspiring in him a desire to effect such changes in Korea. After the Kapsin Coup, he became the first vice-premier 'Jwauijeong' and entered into the Japan–Korea Treaty of 1885. Then, in 1896, Hong-jip was appointed as prime minister to suppress the Donghak Peasant Revolution. During this period, he abolished the caste system of the Joseon Dynasty and carried out an ordinance prohibiting topknots. After the assassination of Empress Myeongseong, "pro-Japan cabinet members like Kim and O Yun-jung were killed."

== Sightseeing and observation of Japan ==
In the summer of 1880, Kim went to Japan with Yun Ung-nyeol and Ji Seog-yeong. This party was called 'Susinsa'. Hong-jip's party took a Japanese ship, 'Chitose', and arrived at Tokyo in July 1880 where they observed and studied Japan's modernization carefully, their ideology becoming pro-Japanese. They agitated the Joseon to open Incheon's ports to trade, and claimed that the Japanese minister should reside in Joseon. They were also surprised at Japan's hygiene, railroad, and operation of steam trains and cars.

After returning to Joseon, Hong-jip introduced Huang Zunxian's stratagem of Joseon with the purpose of creating an enlightened Joseon. He was then promoted to the position of Minister of Culture and Education in the Joseon Dynasty. However, he resigned because of a movement against enlightenment by Confucian scholars. With Queen Min and Gojong's confidence, he resumed his seat as a Minister of 'Tongrigimuamun', which was a recently formed department that handled military secrets and general politics. He asserted that Joseon should join Japan, the Qing dynasty, and America in order to contribute to global development. However, he was often opposed and labeled as 'Pro-Japanese' by a Confucian scholar who opposed modernization.

== Return to Joseon and political activities ==
After returning to Joseon in 1882, Kim was re-appointed to the Joseon Dynasty because, at the time, the Joseon was confronted by many problems, including demanding trade from America and the aftermath of the Imo Incident. He finalized the Japan-Korea Treaty of 1882 with Japan and, using his diplomatic ability, was able to deny many of Japan's requirements, for which he was promoted to governor of Gyeonggi Province. He also made many agreements with Britain, Germany and America.

Hong-jip was then sent to Qing dynasty, Tianjin, for liberation of Heungseon Daewongun. For the purpose of liberation, he persuaded and negotiated with Li Hongzhang, who was a head of that incident. In 1883, he served in many positions and became a practical head of foreign policy. He thought it was important for Joseon to cooperate with other nations for their own development. He also thought that Joseon should developed gradually, not radically. But his thought caused a hostility from a Confucian scholar, and even Heungseon Daewongun had a cynical attitude toward him. In 1884, when the Kapsin Coup occurred, Kim was appointed "Jwauijeong" and became an ambassador plenipotentiary, but he resigned because of the Japan-Korea Treaty of 1885. He was then demoted to a less important post, and he insisted on opening a port. He was re-appointed to Jwauijeong in 1887, but resigned shortly after because local Confucian scholars denounced him as a traitor.

== Kim cabinet ==
During the Donghak Peasant Revolution, Queen Min first asked for auxiliary troops to Qing dynasty, but Japan infiltrated Joseon using the Convention of Tientsin. Kim formed cabinets on four occasions to enlist the help of Japan from 1894 until 1896.

=== The First Cabinet ===
July 23, 1894, Japanese troops attacked Gyeongbokgung Palace and took over the armory to help Hong-jip's forces. Hong-jip organized the First Cabinet and became the prime minister. He brought back Heungseon Daewongun from Qing, then proceeded with the Kabo Reform. He set up an organization for reform,'Gungukkimucheo', and became a governor of that organization. During the Kabo Reform, his cabinet abolished Gwageo, which was Joseon's imperial examination. Also, they reformed the monetary system, government system, and the weights and measures system.

=== The Second Cabinet ===
December 17, 1894, Japan deposed Heungseon Daewongun and broke up the Gunguk Gimucheo. Park Young-hyo, who was in exile, returned to form a cabinet with Kim and introduced the Exemplary Rules in Fourteen Articles (홍범 14조) which had the effect of modernising Joseon's government, territorial administration, tax, education and other affairs. (See Kabo Reform § Second reforms). However, Kim resigned from the cabinet a short time later because of feuds with Park.

=== The Third Cabinet ===
Kim's third cabinet was organized after the Qing–Japan War. As a result of Japanese victory, Japan occupied the peninsular Liaodung. Other imperialist nations like France, Russia, and Germany didn't support Japan's expansion, so they pressured Japan using the Triple Intervention. In this period, Joseon had a pro-Russian cabinet, headed by Kim. Because Japan felt threatened, they killed Queen Min, and the third cabinet collapsed.

=== The Fourth Cabinet ===
The Fourth Cabinet was Hong-jip's last cabinet. This cabinet was pro-Japanese. At first, Kim declined the position of minister, though the king Gojong pleaded to him. But, the King was afraid of Japan, and he carried out 'Korea royal refuge at the Russian legation'. Hong-jip was surprised at that decision and wanted to meet Gojong. Unfortunately, Gojong issued an order to arrest pro-Japanese officials. In the end, Hong-jip and his subordinates were killed by the public.

== Later life ==
=== Pro-Japanese suspicion ===
Kim tried to change the legislative systems and garments of Joseon, and adopt the government structure of Japan. Also, he implemented a solar calendar and the postal system to Joseon. Those changes were influenced by Japan. According to one report, there were some assertions that Hong-jip held the additional post of Gungukkimucheo's master. During this period, he attracted Japanese ministers to his cabinet and empowered them.

=== Attempted suicide ===
On October 8, 1895, Queen Min was assassinated by Japanese, and Kim attempted suicide. Just in time, Yu Kil-chun visited Hong-jip's house and stopped him from completing the act. He persuaded Hong-jip by saying, "Please calm down sir and listen to me. Your death cannot resolve anything. The queen already was killed and the situation has occurred. This state is that Japan stroke to us. However, it is a loyal work for king and nation to resolve a crisis. It is never too late to die after we do that. So please take it easy and deliberate on my opinion.″

Then, Hong-jip replied to Kil-chun, "I know what you say. We endure all humiliation to the end for reformation and preservation of Joseon. However I do not forgive Japan for killing our queen. As a major and loyal servant, how can I granted an audience with king and our subjects? My situation is different from yours. You have an important mission which resolve this crisis and save our nation, but in my case, there is only way that kill myself."

Persistently, Yu Kil-chun convinced Hong-jip and brought him to the royal court. At last, on October 9, 1895, the fourth cabinet was constructed.

== Death ==
Kim's cabinet was a pro-Japanese cabinet. They implemented "the ordinance prohibiting topknots" which was a radical policy, leading many rebellions in Joseon. In 1896, Russophilia became more powerful. This caused King Gojing to seek refuge at the Russian legation. As a result, Hong-jip's cabinet collapsed and he was killed by the public. Angry subjects trampled him to death. The Joseon government got his corpse and cut off his head, then exposed it in Gwanghwamun. His corpse was divided into 8 parts and one was sent to each region of Joseon. As Hong-jip's wife was afraid of the guilt-by-association system, she killed their sons and killed herself. Because Hong-jip's daughters were married before, they were able to avoid punishment.
