= Convention of Tientsin =

1885 treaty between China and Japan

The Tientsin Convention (天津条約, Tenshin Jōyaku), also known as the Tianjin Convention, was an agreement signed by the Qing Empire of China and the Empire of Japan in Tientsin, China on 18 April 1885. It was also called the "Li-Itō Convention".

Following the Gapsin Coup in Joseon in 1884, tensions had been escalating between China and Japan over external influence over the Joseon dynasty of Korea and its royal family. During this coup, the Japanese supported a coup attempt aimed at reforming and modernizing Joseon. The coup plotters sought to eliminate legal enforced social distinctions, eliminating the privileges of the yangban class. The coup failed when China dispatched 1500 soldiers under Yuan Shikai. The Japanese and the coup plotters fled to Japan.

The driving out of the Japanese soldiers by Chinese troops greatly increased tension between the two powers. Following extensive negotiations, Itō Hirobumi of Japan and Li Hongzhang of China attempted to defuse tensions by signing an agreement whereby:

1. Both nations would pull their expeditionary forces out of Joseon within four months.
2. Gojong of Joseon would be advised to hire military instructors from a third nation for the training of the Joseon army.
3. Neither nation would send troops to Joseon without prior notification to the other.

The Convention effectively eliminated China's claim to exclusive influence over the Joseon dynasty of Korea, and made Joseon a co-protectorate of both China and Japan. Despite negotiations, the convention was no deterrent to either party, and the next serious confrontation over Joseon quickly escalated into the First Sino-Japanese War. The immediate result was a rise in Chinese influence over Joseon, which appointed Yuan Shikai as a Resident, a director of Joseon affairs (1885–1894).
