= Kapsin Coup =

1884 failed coup d'état in Korea

Date	December 4, 1884 – December 6, 1884
Location	Hanyang, Joseon
Result	Coup failed

Belligerents
Radical Gaehwa Party; Supported by: Empire of Japan	Extreme conservatives: Joseon Government; Supported by: Qing

Commanders and leaders
Kim Okkyun; Pak Yŏnghyo; Philip Jaisohn; Takezoe Shinichiro	King Gojong; Queen Min; Min Yeong-ik; Yuan Shikai

- Kapsin Coup
- Hangul: 갑신정변; 갑신혁명
- Hanja: 甲申政變; 甲申革命
- RR: Gapsin jeongbyeon; Gapsin hyeongmyeong
- MR: Kapsin chŏngbyŏn; Kapsin hyŏngmyŏng

The Kapsin Coup, (Note: The Korean name for the events takes from the year in the traditional East Asian sexagenary cycle system of dating, Kapsin refers to the year 1884.) also known as the Kapsin Revolution, was a failed three-day coup d'état that occurred in Korea during 1884. Korean reformers in the Enlightenment Party sought to initiate rapid changes within the country, including eliminating social distinctions by abolishing the legal privileges of the yangban class. The coup d'état attempt, with Japanese support, began on December 4, 1884, with seizure of the royal palace Changdeokgung in Seoul and the killing of several members of the pro-Chinese conservative faction. However, the coup was eventually suppressed by a Chinese garrison stationed in the country. Thwarted by the Chinese actions, some of the pro-Japanese faction leaders found exile in Japan. The event led to informal Chinese domination of Korea from 1885 to 1894. Within the Joseon court, Chinese influence grew particularly under the Resident-General Yuan Shikai.

== Background ==
After the Imo Incident of 1882, early reform efforts in Korea suffered a major setback. The aftermath of the event also brought the Chinese into the country where they began to directly interfere in Korean internal affairs, undertaking several initiatives to gain significant influence over the Korean government. A Korean historian stated that "the Chinese government began to turn its former tributary state into a semi-colony and its policy towards Korea substantially changed to a new imperialistic one where the suzerain state demanded certain privileges in her vassal state".

On October 4, 1882, the Korean government signed a new set of trade regulations with the China–Korea Treaty of 1882 (Note: Also known as the "Regulations for Maritime and Overland Trade Between Chinese and Korean Subjects" (Choch'ŏng sangmin suryuk muyŏk changjŏng)) that permitted Chinese merchants to trade in Korea and gave them substantial advantages over the Japanese and Westerners, the regulations also granted the Chinese unilateral extraterritoriality privileges in civil and criminal cases. Although it allowed Koreans reciprocally to trade in Beijing the agreement was not a treaty but was in effect issued as a regulation for a vassal, it also reasserted Korea's dependency on China. In December, two high-level offices, the Oeamun (Foreign Office) and the Naeamun (Home Office) were established. The Oeamun dealt with foreign affairs and trade while the Naeamun was responsible for military matters and internal affairs. At the recommendation of the Chinese two advisors were appointed to the foreign office: the German Paul Georg von Möllendorff who had served in the Chinese Maritime Customs Service and the Chinese diplomat Ma Jianzhong.

A new Korean military formation, the Chingunyeong (Capital Guards Command), was also created and trained along Chinese lines by Yuan Shikai. The Chinese also supervised the creation of a Korean Maritime Customs Service in 1883 with von Möellendorff as its head. Korea was again reduced to a tributary state of China with King Gojong unable to appoint diplomats without Chinese approval and troops stationed in Seoul in order to protect Chinese interests in the country. China also obtained concessions in Korea, notably the Chinese concession of Incheon.

=== Emergence of the Enlightenment Party ===
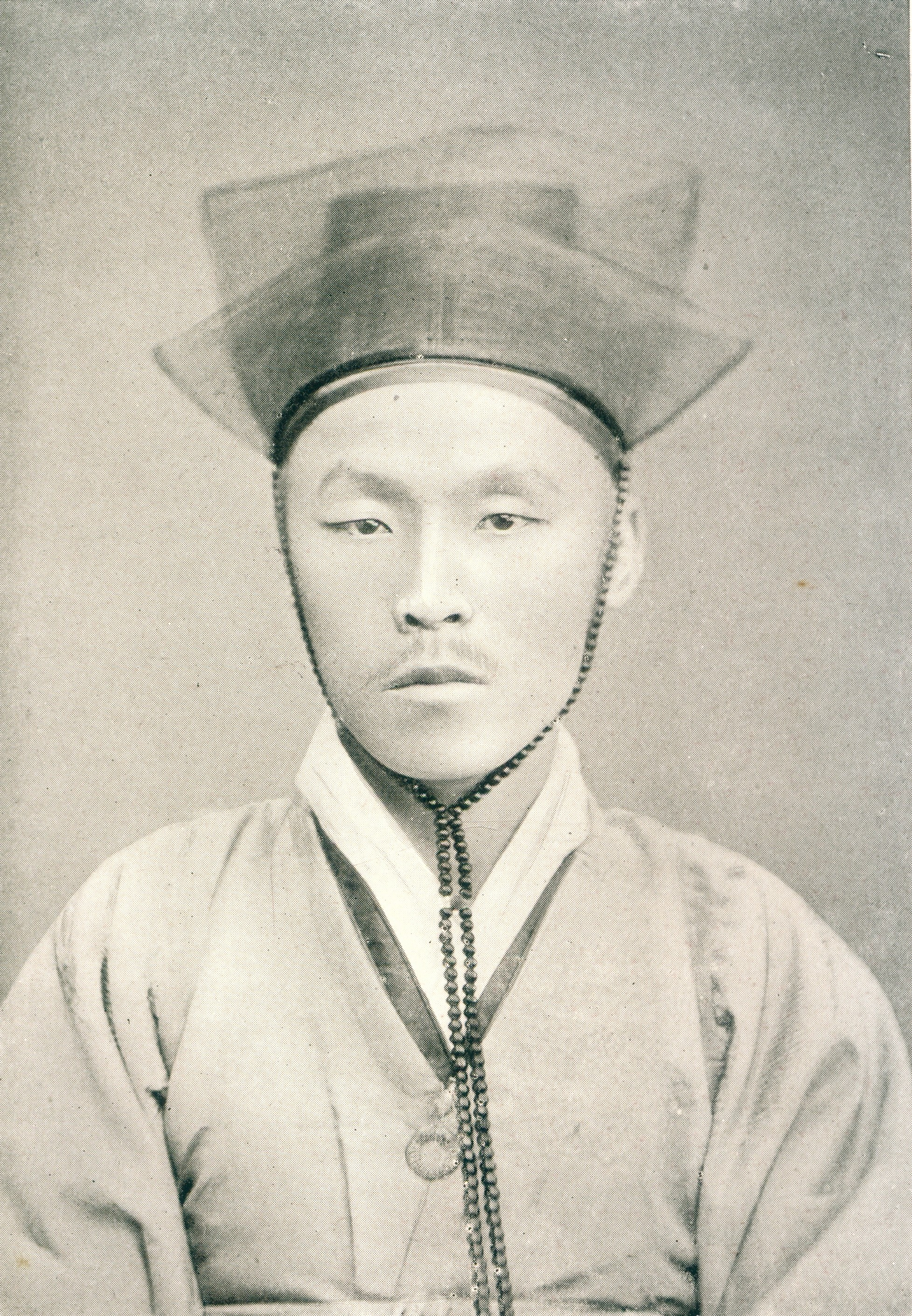
Kim Okkyun

A small group of reformers had emerged around the Enlightenment Party and had become frustrated at the limited scale and arbitrary pace of reforms. The members who constituted the Enlightenment Party were youthful, well-educated Koreans and most were from the yangban class. They were impressed by the developments in Meiji Japan and were eager to emulate them. Its members included Kim Okkyun, Pak Yŏnghyo, Hong Yeong-sik, Seo Gwang-beom, and Philip Jaisohn. The group were all relatively young; Pak Yung-hio came from a prestigious lineage related to the royal family, was 23, Hong was 29, Seo Gwang-beom was 25, and Philip Jaisohn was 20, with Kim Okkyun being the oldest, at 33.

All had spent some time in Japan. In 1882, Pak Yung-hio had been part of a mission sent to Japan to apologize for the Imo incident. He had been accompanied by Kim Okkyun, who later come under the influence of Japanese modernizers such as Fukuzawa Yukichi and also by Seo Gwang-beom. Kim Okkyun, while also studying in Japan, had cultivated friendships with influential Japanese figures and was the de facto leader of the group. They were also strongly nationalistic and desired to make their country truly independent by ending Chinese interference in Korea's internal affairs.

=== Ascendancy of the Min clan and conservatives ===
In Korean history, the king's in-laws enjoyed great power, and the regent Daewongun acknowledged that any future sons-in-law might threaten his authority. Therefore, he attempted to prevent any possible threat to his rule by selecting a new queen for his son, an orphaned girl from among the Yeoheung Min clan, a clan which lacked powerful political connections. With Queen Min as his daughter-in-law and the royal consort, the Daewongun felt secure in his power. However, after she had become queen, Min recruited all her relatives and had them appointed to influential positions in the name of the king. The Queen also allied herself with the Daewongun's political enemies, so that by late 1873 she had mobilized enough influence to oust the Daewongun from power. In October 1873, when the Confucian scholar Choe Ik-hyeon submitted a memorial to King Gojong urging him to rule in his own right, Queen Min seized the opportunity to force her father-in-law's retirement as regent. The Daewongun's departure led to Korea's abandonment of its isolationist policy.

Through the ascendancy of Queen to the throne, the Min clan had also been able to use the newly created institutions by the government as bases for political power, and with their growing monopoly of key positions they frustrated the ambitions of the Enlightenment Party. After the Imo incident in 1882, the Min clan pursued a pro-Chinese policy. This was partly a matter of opportunism as the intervention by Chinese troops led to subsequent exile of the rival Daewongun in Tianjin and the expansion of Chinese influence in Korea.

The Sadaedang was a group of conservatives, which included not only Min Yeong-ik from the Min family but also prominent political figures such as Kim Yun-sik and Eo Yun-jung that wanted to maintain power with China's help. Although the members of the Sadaedang supported the enlightenment policy they favored gradual changes based on the Chinese model. Consequently, the Min clan became advocates of the "dongdo seogi" (Adopting Western knowledge while keeping Eastern values) philosophy, which had originated from the ideas of moderate Chinese reformers who had emphasized the need to maintain the perceived superior cultural values and heritage of the Sino-centric world while recognizing the importance of acquiring and adopting Western technology, particularly military technology, in order to preserve autonomy. Hence, rather than the major institutional reforms such as the adaptation of new values such as legal equality or introducing modern education like in Meiji Japan, the advocates of this school of thought sought piecemeal adoptions of institutions that would strengthen the state while preserving the basic social, political, and cultural order.

== Events of the coup ==
The Gaehwapa members had failed to secure appointments to vital offices in the government and subsequently were unable to implement their reform plans. As a consequence, they were prepared to seize power by all means necessary. An opportunity presented itself to stage a coup d'état in August 1884. As hostilities between France and China erupted over Annam, half of the Chinese troops were withdrawn from Korea. On December 4, 1884, with the help of the Japanese minister Takezoe Shinichiro, who promised to mobilize Japanese legation guards to provide assistance, the members of the Gaehwapa staged their coup under the guise of a banquet hosted by Hong Yeong-sik, director of the General Postal Administration (Ujeong Chongguk) to celebrate the opening of the new national post office. King Gojong was expected to attend together with several foreign diplomats and high-ranking officials, most of whom were members of the pro-Chinese Sadaedang faction. Kim Okkyun and his comrades approached King Gojong, falsely stating that Chinese troops had created a disturbance and escorted him to a small palace, the Gyoengu Palace, where they placed him in the custody of Japanese legation guards. They then proceeded to kill and wound several senior officials of the Sadaedang faction.

After the coup, the Enlightenment Party members formed a new government and devised a program of reform. The radical 14-point reform proposal stated that the following conditions be met: an end to Korea's tributary relationship with China; the abolition of ruling-class privilege and the establishment of equal rights for all; the reorganization of the government as virtually a constitutional monarchy; the revision of land tax laws; cancellation of the grain loan system; the unification of all internal fiscal administrations under the jurisdiction of the Ho-jo; the suppression of privileged merchants and the development of free commerce and trade, the creation of a modern police system including police patrols and royal guards; and severe punishment of corrupt officials.

However the new government failed, lasting no longer than a few days, especially as the members of Gaehwapa were supported by no more than 140 Japanese troops facing at least 1,500 Chinese garrisoned in Seoul under the command of General Yuan Shikai. Facing this threat to her power, Queen Min secretly requested military intervention from the Chinese. Consequently, even before the reform measures were made public, within three days the coup was suppressed by the Chinese troops who attacked and defeated the Japanese forces and restored power to the pro-Chinese Sadaedang faction. During the ensuing melee Hong Yeong-sik was killed, the Japanese legation building was burned down and forty Japanese soldiers were killed. The surviving Korean coup leaders, including Kim Okkyun, Pak Yŏnghyo, Seo Gwang-beom, and Philip Jaisohn, escaped to the port of Chemulpo under escort of the Japanese minister Takezoe. From there they boarded a Japanese ship for exile in Japan. On 23 October, 9 participants including Kim Okkyun, Philip Jaisohn, Ryu Hyeok-ro, Byeon Su, Lee Kyu-wan, Jeong Nan-gyou, Shin Ung-hui succeeded in fleeing to Japan.

== Consequences ==
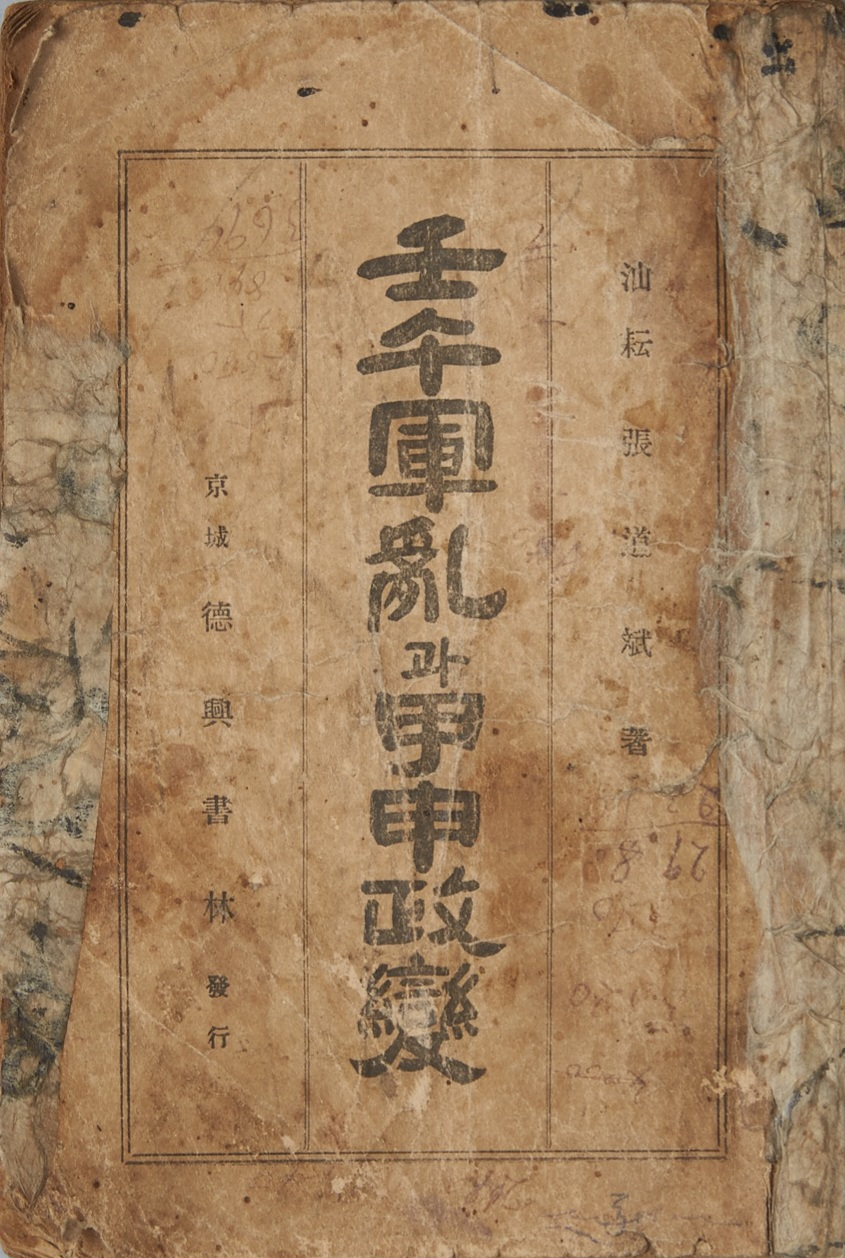
The book, Imo Incident and Kapsin Coup

After the abortive coup, King Gojong voided the reform measures proposed by the coup leaders and sent an envoy to Japan protesting its involvement in the coup and demanding repatriation of the conspirators. The Japanese government instead demanded an apology and reparations for damages from the Korean government over the incident. In January 1885, with a show of force, the Japanese dispatched two battalions and seven warships to Korea, which resulted in the Japan–Korea Treaty of 1885 (Treaty of Hanseong), signed on 9 January 1885 by the Korean government with the Japanese envoy, Foreign Minister Inoue Kaoru. The treaty restored diplomatic relations between the two nations, and the Korean government agreed to pay the Japanese ¥100,000 for damages to their legation and provide a site and buildings for a new legation.

Prime minister Ito Hirobumi, in order to overcome Japan's disadvantageous position in Korea followed by the abortive coup, visited China to discuss the matter with his Chinese counterpart, Li Hongzhang. The two parties succeeded in concluding the Convention of Tianjin on May 31, 1885. The two parties also pledged to withdraw their troops from Korea within four months, with prior notification to the other, if troops were to be sent to Korea in the future. After both countries withdrew their forces, they left behind a precarious balance of power on Korean peninsula between those two nations. Meanwhile, Yuan Shikai remained in Seoul appointed as the Chinese Resident and continued to interfere with Korean domestic politics.

The coup significantly disrupted reform efforts that arose from the 1883 Korean special mission to the United States. Some of the mission's members were part of the Gaehwa Party, and were either killed or forced into exile.

== See also ==
- History of Korea
- Kabo Reform

== Bibliography ==
- Duus, Peter (1998). The Abacus and the Sword: The Japanese Penetration of Korea. Berkeley: University of California Press. ISBN 0-52092-090-2.
- Keene, Donald (2002). Emperor of Japan: Meiji and His World, 1852–1912. New York: Columbia University Press. ISBN 0-231-12341-8.
- Kim, Jinwung (2012). A History of Korea: From "Land of the Morning Calm" to States in Conflict. New York: Indiana University Press. ISBN 978-0-253-00024-8.
- Kim, Djun Kil (2005). The History of Korea. Westport, Connecticut: Greenwood Press. ISBN 9780313332968; ISBN 9780313038532; OCLC 217866287
- Kleiner, Jergen (2001). Korea: A Century of Change. River Edge, New Jersey: World Scientific Publishing Company. ISBN 9810246579 ISBN 9789810246570; OCLC 48993770
- Seth, Michael J. (2011). A History of Korea: From Antiquity to the Present. Rowman & Littlefield. ISBN 978-0-742-56715-3.
