= Kim Okkyun =

Korean politician (1851–1894)

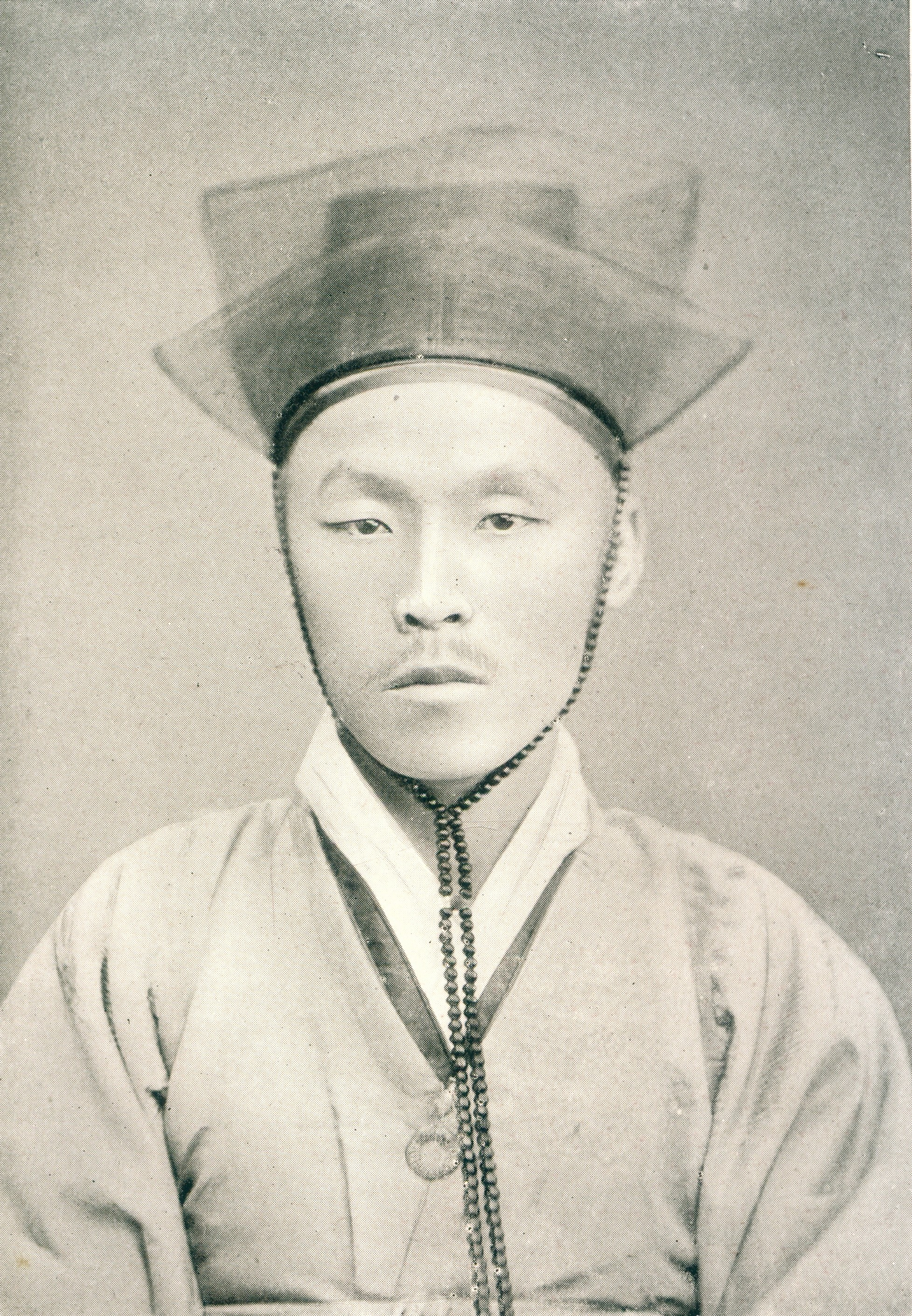
- Born: February 23, 1851; South Chungcheong Province, Joseon
- Died: March 28, 1894 (aged 43); Shanghai, Qing
- Parents: Kim Byeong-tae (father); Lady Song of the Eunjin Song clan (mother)
- Relatives: Kim Byeong-gi (adoptive father); Lady Jo of the Pungyang Jo clan (adoptive mother)
- Family: Shin Andong Kim clan

Korean name
- Hangul: 김옥균
- Hanja: 金玉均
- RR: Gim Okgyun
- MR: Kim Okkyun

Art name
- Hangul: 고균, 고우
- Hanja: 古筠, 古愚
- RR: Gogyun, Gou
- MR: Kogyun, Kou

Kim Okkyun (Korean: 김옥균; Hanja: 金玉均; February 23, 1851 – March 28, 1894) was a Korean scholar-bureaucrat of the late Joseon period. He was a member of the reformist Gaehwa Party. He served under King Gojong, and actively participated to advance Western European ideas and sciences in Korea. The goal of the reform movement was to develop Korea in government, technology, and military by using foreign resources to help Korea become stable enough to withstand anticipated increases in foreign encroachment. Kim was assassinated in Shanghai, and later was given the posthumous title "Chungdal".

== Early life ==
Kim was born into the Andong Kim clan to Kim Pyŏngt'ae and his wife, Lady Song of the Eunjin Song clan, on 23 February 1851 in South Chungcheong Province. Through his father, Kim is related to Kim Sangyong, the older brother of Queen Sunwon's 6th great-grandfather, Kim Sang-gwan. His family was poor, and, by the age of four, they moved to Cheonan. His father opened a Seodang, or Korean verbal school, at which Kim was educated. When he was six, he was adopted by Kim Pyŏnggi, a distant relative who had lost his son and was desperate to secure the continuation of his family lineage.

For four years, Kim stayed in what is today Seoul and, when Kim Pyŏnggi was named the governor in Gangneung state in spring of 1861, they moved once again. When Kim reached the age of fifteen, Kim Pyŏnggye was named "Beopmubu Chagwan" in the judicial office, and his family returned to Seoul. There, Kim learned and competed with the sons of other aristocratic families. He displayed his talents in playing the Kayakem, singing and dancing, poetry, calligraphy, and art. His fame and talents eventually reached the imperial palace, and Queen Dowager invited him.

At the age of 22, Kim took the national civil service exam, and was ranked "Changwon Kŭpchae" (level 6) (usually it took about ten years to achieve this status). To avoid the possible negative impacts of the internal political conflicts that could result on his adopted son, Kim Byung-gi retired from his holding.

== Revolutionary efforts ==
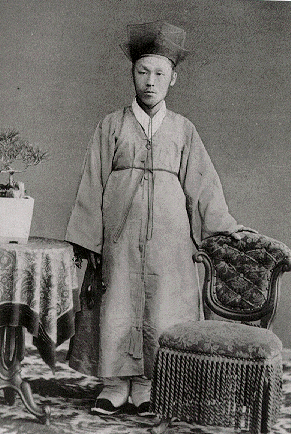
1882 photograph of Okkyun in Nagasaki

At the time, Heungseon Daewongun, who had implemented policies to avoid contact with the West for ten years, lost political power. Although trade with Europeans began and foreign policies were adopted, the situation worsened, and Kim meddled in the internal conflicts in the palace.

=== Dongnipdang ===
Kim advocated for more open policies to the West so that Korea might adopt Western European ideals, knowledge, and technology, thereby securing its existence in the rapidly modernizing world of the 19th century. During his national civil service, Kim found many others who agreed with him, and they formed the Dongnipdang, or "Independence Party."

Among their various contacts, the group met a Buddhist monk at Bongwonsa, who showed them a peculiar European device. It was a projector that displayed different photographs of West European, such as the streets of London and a Portuguese soldier. He also showed a Japanese book that contained scenes of foreign nations. The activists asked the monk to obtain more Western European artifacts for them. The monk then spent two months journeying to and from Japan bringing more Western European products. These had to be kept hidden due to the policies of the time which prohibited foreign contact.

=== First plan ===
After the conflict with the Imperial Japanese Navy and the implementation of the Treaty of Ganghwa, which Kim was against, Kim realized that Japan, regarded by the Korean government as a barbaric nation, had westernized and become a much stronger country. Therefore, Kim wished to visit Japan to learn how the Japanese had western Europeanized. In November 1881, Kim was granted permission to visit Japan under the mission of finding out whether Japan was planning to invade Korea. After arriving in Tokyo, he met with various influential Japanese politicians during his stay, and was sponsored by Fukuzawa Yukichi to study at Keio University from February to August 1882. Kim concluded that for now Japan would not invade Korea because its military strength was not comparable to Qing China. Kim felt that, in order to ensure survival when China was in decline, Korea would have to borrow Japanese help to modernize itself, and that the only solution to the situation was to introduce a new political force to wipe out the present dominant party.

During his stay in Japan, he sought assistance, and Japanese statesman Inoue Kaoru promised him 3,000,000 won (Korean currency) if Kim were to obtain permission from Korean Emperor Gojong for reforms. Unfortunately, conflicts with a German ambassador and a change in Japanese policy on Korea caused Inoue to break his promise. Kim returned home in March 1884 without having attained his goal.

=== Second plan: Kapsin Coup ===
The Gaehwapa activists continued to meet at Kim's private house and discuss the ongoing events concerning East Asia and the international politics. In a feast offered by Kim for the members of the Min Yeong-ik political faction, several Japanese government officials were present, including Inoue and several of the Gaehwapa activists. Under the uncomfortable atmosphere, the discussions soon led to the Sino-French War. The Min Yeong-ik faction fiercely supported Qing China (which they felt would ensure the survival of Korea), and Japan fiercely supported France (which they felt would allow Japan to overtake Korea). The meeting broke up as Kim and others tried to stop the heated exchanges of debate. From this meeting, Kim could clearly predict that Japan would try to take advantage of the Sino-French War by extending its influence on Korea.

Clandestinely, Kim visited the Japanese embassy after the feast. During a discussion with Shimamura, Kim questioned Japan's stance for the Gaehwapa and complained about the incident with Inoue. Shimamura explained that the Japanese still support the movement, and that the internal conflicts and misunderstandings contributed to the ill relationship for Kim with Inoue. He added that the Sino-French War was a great chance for spurring another movement, to which the Japanese government would definitely respond to.

In a meeting of the Gaehwapa activists and Japanese supporters, Kim outlined a plan for the revolution. It consisted of the assassinations of certain political figures, and creating a major chaos on the day of the reception for the founding of "Ujeongchongguk" (우정총국; 郵政總局), or Office for International Postal Service. They would select potential enemies as scapegoats to whom the blame would rest. The Japanese embassy strongly pledged their active military support to this plan. The young Philip Jaisohn and Soh Kwang-pom also supported Kim's efforts to overturn the old retrograde regime.

On the night of December 4, 1884, near the post office opening reception, a fire occurred. While the activists created chaos with explosives and gunshots, the assassins proceeded in their murders. Over the night, the Gaehwapa became the prevailing party in the government. This event is known as the Kapsin Coup.

=== Chinese interference ===
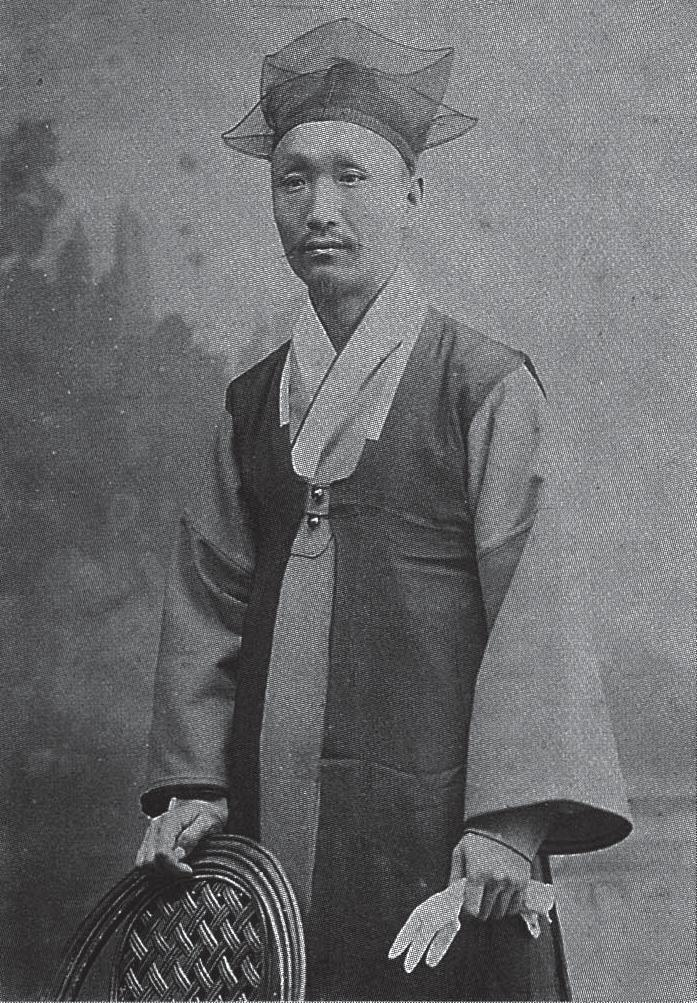
Hong Jong-u, the assassin of Kim Okkyun, ca. 1895

The truths behind the Kapsin Coup were leaked to Queen Min (posthumously known as Empress Myeongseong), and the plans of the Gaehwapa threatened her political rights. Therefore, the queen secretly requested the Chinese military for their presence. The Korean and Japanese soldiers fought outnumbered against the Chinese army, but were forced to retreat. With the predominance of the Chinese army, the Gaehwapa activists lost power to the Sadaedang, and their lives were threatened. The Gaehwapa activists headed toward the city port of Jemulpo (Incheon) under the escort of the Japanese ambassador Takejo, and boarded a Japanese ship, Sensei. When there was a request to the Japanese ambassador Takejo to hand over the activists, he yielded; the Japanese captain Sujikas scolded Takejo and prohibited their release. The activists fled, many to the United States, but Kim Okkyun to Japan. Because his Korean name would be unfit for living in Japan, the captain gave Kim a new name, Iwata Shusaku. He led a life under the protection of the Japanese government, staying in Tokyo, then in Sapporo, and also visiting the Ogasawara Islands.

Following the failure of the Kapsin Coup, Kim lived in fear of assassination. However, when invited to meet with Li Hongzhang (李鴻章) in Shanghai, he felt that he could not refuse. Before departing Kim gave his personal diaries to Koyama, one of his close Japanese friends, in case something should happen to him. Hong Jong-u, who had travelled to Japan in 1893 to assassinate Kim Okkyun and Pak Yŏnghyo, another reform-minded Korean, learned of the voyage and managed to obtain passage to China on the same vessel. While en route to Shanghai he killed Kim Okkyun with a pistol. Hong later returned to Korea where he was appointed to high office. Kim's body was turned over to a Chinese warship, where it was dismembered. Parts of the body were put on public display in several towns in Korea as a traditional humiliation and punishment for treason. In Japan, there was an official protest to the Chinese government over the treatment of Kim's remains. Fukuzawa Yukichi led a memorial service in Japan in Kim's honor, and erected a gravestone for him at the Aoyama Cemetery in Tokyo. The assassination of Kim Okkyun was cited by the Japanese as one of the events leading to the First Sino-Japanese War.

== After his death ==
Kim Okkyun's assassination served as a casus belli for the First Sino-Japanese War. The Japanese government predicted the assassination of Kim Okkyun, but they did not stop the assassination.

== Family ==
- Father
  - Kim Pyŏngt'ae (김병태; 金炳台)
    - Adoptive father - Kim Pyŏnggi (김병기; 金炳基; 1814–1891)
- Mother
  - Lady Song of the Eunjin Song clan (은진 송씨)
    - Adoptive mother - Lady Jo of the Pungyang Jo clan (풍양 조씨)
- Siblings
  - Older sister - Kim Kyuni (김균이), Lady Kim of the Andong Kim clan (?–1944)
  - Younger brother - Kim Kakkyun (김각균; 金珏均)
- Wives and their children
  - Lady Yu of the Gangreung Yu clan (강릉 유씨)/Lady Yu of the Gigye Yu clan (기계 유씨)
    - Daughter - Lady Kim of the Andong Kim clan
    - Son - Kim Yŏngjin (김영진; 金英鎭; 26 May 1876 – 16 January 1947)
      - Grandson - Kim Sŏnghan (김성한; 金聲漢; 1918–?)
  - Concubine - Lady Song (송씨)
  - Sukitani Otama (스기타니 오타마)
  - Masuno Naka (마쓰노 나카, 松野なか)
    - Daughter - Kim Sada (사다)
    - Son-in-law - Suzuki Ichigoro (스즈키 이치고로; 鈴木市五郎)
      - Granddaughter - Suzuki Hideko (히데코; 1910 – 6 June 1937)
  - Nami (나미)
    - Unnamed son
  - Unnamed concubine
    - Kim Hakjin (김학진; 金學鎭)

== Popular culture ==
- Portrayed by Yoo Tae-woong in the 2010 SBS TV series Jejungwon.
- Portrayed by Yoon Hee-seok in the 2014 KBS TV series Gunman in Joseon.

== Bibliography ==
- Woong-jin Wee-in-jun-gi #19 Kim Okgyun by Baek Suk-gi. (C) 1996 Woongjin Publishing Co., Ltd.
- Woong-jin Wee-in-jun-gi #19 Kim Okkyun by Baek Suk-gi. (C) 1996 Woongjin Publishing Co., Ltd.
