= Pak Yŏnghyo =

Korean politician (1861–1939)

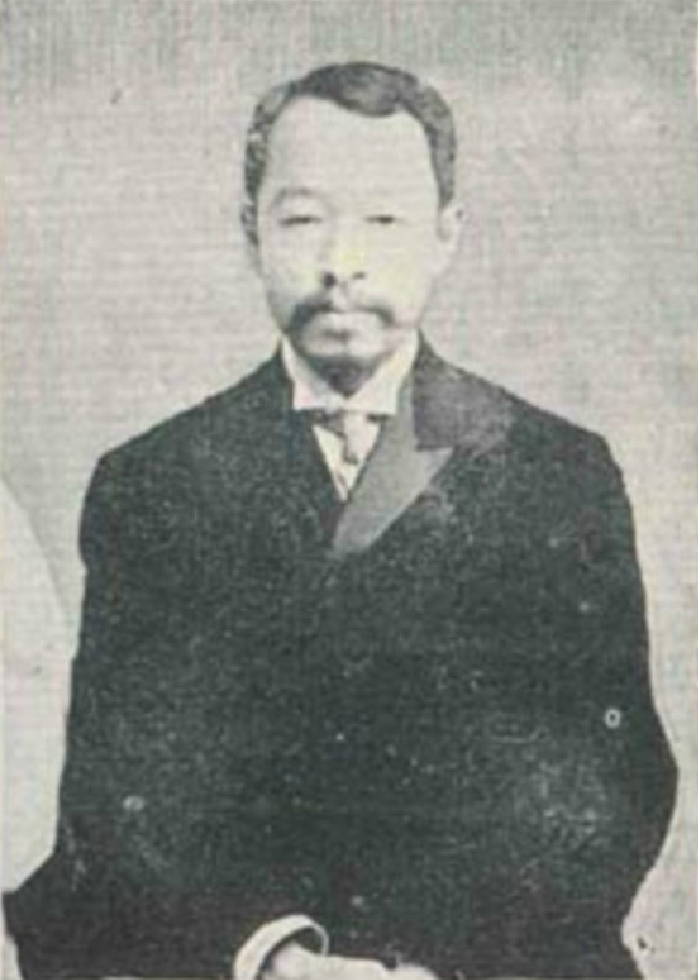
- Pak in 1910

Prime Minister of Joseon
- In office May 21, 1895 – May 31, 1895
- Monarch: Gojong
- Preceded by: Kim Hong-jip
- Succeeded by: Bak Jeongyang

Personal details
- Born: 12 June 1861 Suwon, Gyeonggi Province, Joseon
- Died: 21 September 1939 (aged 78) Jongno District, Keijō, Korea, Empire of Japan
- Domestic partner: Princess Yeonghye
- Relatives: Bannam Park clan

Korean name
- Hangul: 박영효
- Hanja: 朴泳孝
- RR: Bak Yeonghyo
- MR: Pak Yŏnghyo

Art name
- Hangul: 춘고; 현현거사
- Hanja: 春皐; 玄玄居士
- RR: Chungo; Hyeonhyeongeosa
- MR: Ch'un'go; Hyŏnhyŏn'gŏsa

Courtesy name
- Hangul: 자순
- Hanja: 子純
- RR: Jasun
- MR: Chasun

Pak Yŏnghyo (Korean: 박영효; Hanja: 朴泳孝; 12 June 1861 – 21 September 1939) was a Korean politician from the Joseon period, an enlightenment activist, diplomat, and pro-Japanese collaborator. He was one of the organizers of the 1884 Kapsin Coup, in which progressive political elements attempted to overthrow the conservative Korean government. He became Prince Consort Geumneung through his marriage to Princess Yeonghye, King Cheoljong's daughter.

== Early life and education ==
Pak Yŏnghyo was born in Suwon, south of Hanseong. He was the third son of Pak Won-yang and his mother was Lady Yi of the Jeonui Yi clan.

By birth, he also had a distant connection with the Royal Family: his 7th great-grandfather was Pak Se-gyo (박세교; 朴世橋; 1611–1663), the only son of King Seonjo's 5th daughter, Princess Jeongan (정안옹주; 1590–1660), and Pak Mi, Prince Consort Geumyang (박미 금양위; 朴瀰 錦陽尉; 1592–1645).

Pak Yŏnghyo was also an adoptive 16th great-grandson of Pak Eun (박은, 朴誾; 1370–1422) who was the great-great-grandfather of Queen Inseong, wife of King Injong, and the 4th great-grandfather of Queen Uiin, first wife of King Seonjo. Thus making him distant cousins with the queens.

On April 3, 1872, he was chosen to be the spouse of Princess Yeonghye, the only living daughter of King Cheoljong, the 25th King of Joseon. However, the princess died just three months after their wedding.

Together with Kim Okkyun, Pak was a strong supporter of the Dongnipdang, or "Enlightenment Party", which sought to reform the government, economy, and military by incorporating Western technology and methodology, so that Korea would become stable enough to withstand increasing foreign encroachment. He accompanied Kim on his visit to Tokyo, meeting with various influential Japanese politicians, including Fukuzawa Yukichi.

== Career ==
He is credited with creating the first Korean national flag, in 1882.

=== Kapsin Coup ===
Pak was one of the leaders of the 1884 Kapsin Coup that attempted to overthrow the government and institute Western-style reforms. The coup attempt lasted only three days before its suppression by Chinese troops. He was forced to flee to Japan, where he initially stayed with Fukuzawa Yukichi, before moving on to Kobe.

=== Subsequent career ===
Following the Japanese Occupation of Gyeongbokgung Palace, Pak returned to Korea with some of his entourage, such as Lee Kyu-wan and Ryu Hyeok-ro. Arriving Seoul on 23 August 1894, Pak requested a discursive authority to reform the country to Gojong. But because public ideas about reforms remained so negative due to the Kapsin Coup, Pak was not able to gain great political power, and instead fled to Incheon. Following the Japanese victory of Battle of Pyongyang, the Korean public started to regard Japan as the new leading power in Asia. Finally on 9 December, Pak and his allies gained political independence. Furthermore, Pak successfully managed the coup of Heungseon Daewongun, who was trying to make Yi Jun-yong the king. Pak gained the trust of Gojong and the Japanese minister. The Second Kim Hong-jip cabinet was established, and Pak was appointed as Minister of Interior. Even though Pak was not the prime minister, he gained great authority to equal that position. Pak did not enjoy being a puppet of Japan; he started to build his own political basements by appointing Lee Kyu-wan as the commander of police and Ryu Hyeok-ro as the Director of Artillery. However, Pak once asked Gojong to replace his bodyguards with Hunryeondae, which was a Japanese-influenced organization. This proposal made the king furious; the Min regime identified Pak as an enemy, forcing Pak to flee to Japan again. After the removal of Pak, the new cabinet became pro-American, Russian, and English, consisting of Bak Jeongyang, Ye Wanyong, Yi Bum-jin, and Min Young-hwan.

Following the Japan-Korea Treaty of 1910, in which Korea was annexed to the Empire of Japan, Pak was awarded with the kazoku title of marquess (koshaku) in the Japanese peerage, and a seat in the House of Peers in the Diet of Japan. He served as Director of the Bank of Chōsen in 1918, Chairman of the Korean Economic Association in 1919, first president of The Dong-A Ilbo newspaper in 1920, president of the Kyungbang Corporation, chairman of the Korea Industrialization Bank in 1921, and advisor to the Government-General of Korea's Central Institute.

== Family ==
Pak didn't remarry due to the connections he gained through his marriage to Princess Yeonghye.

Thus having him to take in 3 concubines which produced 3 illegitimate children; 1 daughter, Pak Myook, and 2 sons, Pak Chinsŏ and Pak Ilsŏ. Among Pak's granddaughters was Park Chan-ju, who was married to Prince Yi U, and was the mother of Yi Cheong.

Pak Chanju's younger brother, Pak Chanbŏm (박찬범, 朴贊汎; 17 August 1917 – 23 November 1986) eventually married, and later divorced, Yi Kang's third illegitimate daughter, Yi Haech'un (이해춘; 1921–2009), and had one son Pak Hyŏngu (박형우, 朴亨雨; 1937–2012).

- Father – Pak Wŏnyang (박원양; 朴元陽; 1804–1884)
- Mother
  - Biological – Lady Yi of the Jeonju Yi clan (전의 이씨; 全義 李氏; 1817–1884), Pak Won-yang's third wife
  - Step – Lady Yi (이씨; 1802–?)
  - Step – Lady Song (송씨; 1803–1822)
- Siblings
  - Older sister – Lady Pak of the Bannam Park clan (반남 박씨; 1847–?)
  - Older brother – Pak Yŏnggyo (박영교; 朴泳敎; 1849–1884)
  - Older brother – Pak Yŏngho (박영호; 朴泳好; 1852–1897)
  - Older sister – Lady Pak of the Bannam Park clan (반남 박씨; 1858–?)
- Spouse
  - Princess Yeonghye (1859 – 4 July 1872) – No issue.
- Concubines and their issue
  - Sun Kiltang (순길당; 順吉堂; 1861–?) – No issue.
  - Lady Pŏm (범씨; 1865–?)
    - Daughter – Pak Myook (박묘옥), Lady Pak of the Bannam Park clan (반남 박씨; 1884–?)
    - Son – Pak Hŭngwŏn (박흥원; 朴興元; 1895–?)
  - Pak Kyŏnghŭi (박경희; 朴景熙; 1870–?)
    - Son – Pak Chinsŏ (박진서; 朴振緖; 1893–?)
    - Son – Pak Ilsŏ (박일서; 朴日緖; 1897–1931) (Note: Was the father of Park Chan-ju)
  - Unnamed concubine (1890–?) – No issue.

== Writings ==
- Sahwa giryak (사화기략; 使和記略)

== See also ==
- Ye Wanyong
- Bak Jesun
- Yun Chi-ho
