= No Paengnin =

Korean army officer (1875–1926)

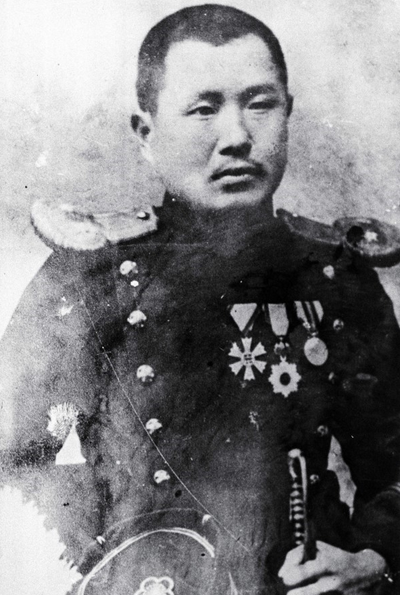

Director of Education Section of Ministry of Military
- Monarch: Gojong
- Preceded by: Yi Byeong-mu
- Succeeded by: Abolished

Personal details
- Born: 15 February 1875 Songhwa County, Hwanghae Province, Joseon Dynasty
- Died: 22 January 1926 (aged 50) Shanghai, Republic of China
- Profession: Army Officer, and Independence Activist

Military service
- Allegiance: Korean Empire
- Branch/service: Imperial Korean Army
- Years of service: 1900–1909
- Rank: Colonel

Korean name
- Hangul: 노백린
- Hanja: 盧伯麟
- RR: No Baekrin
- MR: No Paengnin

No Paengnin (Korean: 노백린; Hanja: 盧伯麟) was an Imperial Korean army officer and independence activist.

== Life ==
No was born on 15 February 1875 in Hwanghae Province. He studied traditional Korean studies. His father believed that his traits as soldier, showing up from his young age, would make him a great general in adulthood. In 1895, No was selected as one of the state sponsored students and was sent abroad to Japan, sponsored by Ministry of Interior Park Yung-hyo. He enrolled in Keio University, and after graduating, he subsequently enrolled in the Imperial Japanese Army Academy in 1898. After his graduation of the academy, he was deployed to the 1st Brigade, and 3rd Brigade as an apprentice officer.

In June 1900, No returned to Korea after completing his education in Japan. Upon his return to Korea, No was commissioned as Junior Lieutenant. In April 1901, No was employed as an instructor of the Military Academy of Korean Empire, educating aspiring young officers, with support from Min Young-hwan. On 4 December 1905, No was appointed as an instructor in the Army College of Korean Empire.

As a proud nationalist, he despised Koreans collaborating with Japan in their plans to annex Korea. In March 1906, No was invited to a party by Resident-General Itō Hirobumi. Hirobumi also invited many Korean prominent officials, including pro-Japanese politicians such as Song Byeong-jun and Ye Wanyong. During the party, he insulted Ye Wanyong by calling him like a dog. General Hasegawa Yoshimichi, furious, pulled out his sword; No, in turn, pulled his sword out. Ito eventually mediated the two.

No was also actively participating in the Nationalist Enlightenment movement. He supported the "Daehan Gurakbu," and "Daehan Heung Hak Hui." He participated in the establishment of New People's Association too.

After the dissolution of the Imperial Korean army in 1907, No was commissioned as the Director of Education Section of Ministry of Military, as the Imperial Korean Army college was also dissolved. On May 20, 1908, he retired from the army with the rank of Colonel. After his retirement, No joined the Daehan Industry Association with other former army officers. When Korea was annexed by Japan, No became increasingly reclusive.

The Imperial Japanese government attempted to appease No, but he subsequently refused any offered position. In 1914, No was actively participating in the Korean independence movement alongside his family. In 1916, No went into exiled in Shanghai and eventually settled in Hawaii.

After the March First Movement, No was appointed as minister of the military within the Provisional Government of the Republic of Korea. Before joining the government in Shanghai, No established an aviation academy in America. In February 1921, No arrived at Shanghai to join the resistance movement. The following year, No was appointed the position of prime minister of the Provisional Government, but resigned the position in April 1924. Under the Yi Dong-nyeong cabinet, No was appointed as Minister of Military. No died on January 22, 1926 from kidney disease. Before his death, he enjoyed wearing his Imperial Korean Army uniform, and dreamed of entering Namdaemun atop his horse.

The Korean government posthumously awarded No the Order of Merit for National Foundation 1st class in 1962.

== Award ==
Korean Empire

- Order of the Palgwae 6th Class on 29 May 1904

Empire of Japan

- Order of the Rising Sun 6th Class
