= Yun Chi-sung =

Korean general (1875–1936)

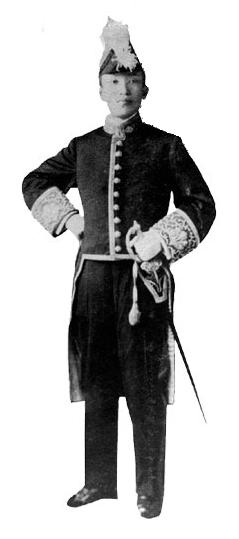
- Born: 2 March 1875; Asan, Kingdom of Joseon
- Died: 11 August 1936 (aged 61)
- Relatives: Father:Yun Yeong-ryeol; Older Brother: Yun Chi-oh; Older Brother: Yun Chi-so; Younger Brother:Yun Chi-Byeong; Younger Brother: Yun Chi-Myeong; Younger Brother: Yun Chi-young; Cousin: Yun Chi-ho
- Military career
- Allegiance: Korean Empire
- Branch: Imperial Korean Army; Imperial Japanese Army (shortly)
- Service years: 1900–1908
- Rank: Lieutenant Colonel
- Unit: 8th Cavalry Regiment (Japanese)
- Conflicts: Russo-Japanese War
- Awards: Order of the Palgwae 3rd Class; Order of the Rising Sun 6th Class; Order of the Sacred Treasure 4th Class
- Other work: Businessman

- Yun Chi-sung
- Hangul: 윤치성
- Hanja: 尹致晟
- RR: Yun Chiseong
- MR: Yun Ch'isŏng

Art name
- Hangul: 악연
- Hanja: 岳淵
- RR: Akyeon
- MR: Agyŏn

Yun Chi-sung (Korean: 윤치성; March 2, 1875 – August 11, 1936) was an Imperial Korean military personnel, politician and independence activist. His nickname was Agyeon (Korean: 악연; Hanja: 岳淵). He was the uncle of Yun Posun, and the cousin of Yun Chi-ho and Yun Chi-Wang.

== Biography ==
Yun was born on March 2, 1875, in Asan. He was the third son of Yun Yeong-ryeol. He was one of the students sent to Japan. He entered the Keio University on 5 November 1885 and graduated in 1886 November. He later returned his country after being commissioned to shavetail of Imperial Korea. He entered the course of becoming an officer. On 25 November 1899, Yun graduated the military academy. On 25 June 1900, Yun was appointed as cavalry Second lieutenant. In 1905, he was veterans to the Russo-Japanese War. Returnees since worked at the Department of Defense of the Korean Empire, also appointed to department of Defense Education supervisor. In 1905, he was joined to anti movement against of Japan–Korea Treaty of 1905 also he was identity of the soldiers. On 10 October 1905, Yun became part of the Ministry of Military. In December 1905, Yun was removed from the Ministry of Military.

On 10 January 1906, he was one of the Attaché sent to Empire of Japan as a Cavalry Captain. While he was in Japan, Yun became a Cavalry major and received 4th Class of Order of the Sacred Treasure from Japanese Government. On 10 February 1906, Yun returned to Korea. After returning Korea, Yun became part of the Ministry of Military. On 18 October 1906, Yun was promoted to Lieutenant Colonel. On 7 June 1907, Yun became Emperor Gojong's equerry. On 6 September, Yun got a horse from Sunjong of Korea for his merits. On 2 October 1907, Yun became the chairman of education of military education. But he retired and became reserve on 31 July 1909. Empire of Japan considered Yun as a person needed caution. When Yun visited Japan in 1909, Yun was watched by the Japanese Resident-General of Korea. In 1908, he retired from the army and became a businessman. From 1906 to 1923, Yun participated in establishments of companies in Seoul. Yun was part of the Korea Liberation Corps in 1916. During the colonial period, Yun was required to cooperate with Japanese, which he refused.

== Honours ==
Korean Empire

- Order of the Taegeuk 4th class on 9 September 1907
- Order of the Palgwae 3rd class on 28 October 1909

Empire of Japan

- Order of the Rising Sun 6th class on 31 March 1905
- Order of the Sacred Treasure 4th class on 28 January 1906

== Site web ==
- Haepyung Yun's family home (in Korean)
