= Yi Hak-gyun =

Korean general (fl. 19th and 20th centuries)

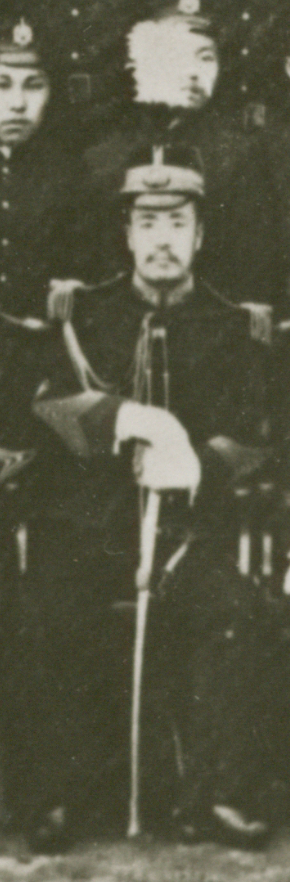
- Yi Hak-gyun as the headmaster of Military Academy of Korean Empire
- Native name: 이학균
- Born: Unknown
- Died: April 1909 Shanghai, Qing Dynasty
- Allegiance: Joseon; Korean Empire
- Branch: Imperial Korean Army
- Service years: 1895–1907
- Rank: Major General (참장)
- Commands: 1st Battalion of Joseon Army

Yi Hak-gyun (Korean: 이학균; Hanja: 李學均; ? – April 1909) was a general and an official of Korean Empire. He was one of the Pro-Russian and American politicians of the Korean Empire like Yi Yong-ik.

== Biography ==
In 1888, Yi was appointed as Aide-de-camp to William McEntyre Dye, the headmaster of the Yunmu Military Academy.

In May 1895, Yi was appointed as the commander of the 1st battalion, and in July of the same year Yi became Jong 2 Poom. The night that Empress Myeongseong was assassinated by the Japanese ronins and soldiers, Yi reported the conspicuous circumstance of Gyeongbokgung to William McEntyre Dye, and Afanasy Seredin-Sabatin. By 4 A.M., Yi ascertained something abnormal was going on the palace; therefore, he woke General Dye and an English Diplomat. As the conspicuous sounds of bullets came closer to him, Yi wore a civilian garment and fled. As the Japanese gained much more control over Korea, with Yi Bum-jin, he refuged to Russian Legation in Korea. In 1896, Minister of Gungnaebu Yi Jae-soon appointed him as a translator of Gungnaebu. In July 1897, Yi was appointed as a chief of ambassador (영선사 장) to Qing dynasty. In July 1897, Yi was again appointed as translator of Gungnaebu. He became a first class member of Jungchuwon. In November 1897, Yi became the commander of 2nd Siwidae battalion.

On 7 October 1898, Yi was appointed as the headmaster of Military Academy of Korean Empire. As a nationalist headmaster, Yi influenced many students, including Park Seung-hwan, to become a nationalist soldiers opposing Japanese attempts to colonize Korea. On 30 December 1898, Yi was promoted to Lieutenant Colonel. When Prince Henry of Prussia visited Korea, Yi was ordered to guard the prince. On 25 July 1899, Yi was appointed as Director of Prosecute Section of the Board of Marshals. On 21 August 1899, Yi was appointed as major general. On 19 February 1900, Yi became Director of Recording Section of the Board of Marshals. On 19 March 1901, Yi was appointed as the headmaster of Military Academy of Korean Empire. On 11 October 1901, Yi was appointed as the chief of the Military court. In October 1902, Yi visited Japan to watch Fall training of the Imperial Japanese Army. Before the Russo-Japanese War, Yi with Yi Yong-ik and other Pro-Russian and American politicians persuaded who Gojong to claim the neutrality of the war. It was supposed to keep the secrets from other countries.

After the Japan–Korea Treaty of February 1904 was signed, the Japanese government attempted to minimize the influence of Yi and his faction in the Korean politics, by imprisoning Yi, Hyeon Sang-geon, and Gil Young-su. Even though Japan was able to minimize his political power, they were not able to neither imprison nor kidnap him. On 9 March 1904, Yi was removed from the position of judge of military court. When he thought that the Empire of Japan was trying to kidnap him, Yi hided in the French legation then refuged to Shanghai. Japanese discerned that Yi was refuging to Shanghai, but failed to apprehend Yi. After the signing of Japan–Korea Agreement of August 1904, Yi went to Russia and brought secrete message of Pavlov, Russian ambassador to Korea, that Russia will assure Korea's independence and stop Japan from interrupting Korea to Emperor Gojong. On 3 September 1907, Yi was removed from the army. He died in Shanghai in April 1909.

== Assessment ==
Horace Newton Allen wrote, 'Ye Hak Kiun. A bright military man. Did well and always kept out of trouble until he got scared and took refuge at Sontag's with Hyen Sang Kun, and was suspected and had to flee to China where he was injured by a fall from his horse and became an opium fiend. He might have been a useful man.'

William Franklin Sands wrote, 'Another member of the circle was Ye Hak Kiun, General Dye's assistant and now head of the military academy. He too was a good friend.'

== Award ==
Empire of Japan

- Order of the Sacred Treasure 2nd Class
