= Ministry of Military (Korean Empire) =

1895–1909 Korean government ministry

Ministry of Military of Korean Empire
- 군부

Agency overview
- Formed: 1 April 1895
- Dissolved: 1909
- Jurisdiction: Government of Korean Empire
- Annual budget: 3,594,911 Won (1903); 4,852,175 Won (1905)

Korean name
- Hangul: 군부
- Hanja: 軍部
- RR: Gunbu
- MR: Kunbu

The Ministry of Military (Korean: 군부) was a department of the governments of Joseon and its successor the Korean Empire that oversaw military affairs.

== History ==
The Ministry of Military was formed during the Gabo Reform, when the ministries of the governments were re-organized. Ministry of Military supervised the army in general. As the Board of Marshals was established and installed in Palace, the Ministry of Military diminished in the authority. The ministry was left with the general administration. After the Japan–Korea Treaty of 1907, Gunbu became Qinwibu and was disestablished in July 1909.

== Organizations ==
The ministry of military included 26 people. Most of the members had military ranks. There was 1 Minister who was a Lieutenant General, Hyeopan who was a Major General. Directors of each sections were either Colonel or Major General.

In 1895, there were 5 affiliated organizations of the Ministry of Military. There was Dae-shin Gwan-bang (Hangul: 대신관방, Hanja: 大臣官房), which was the office of Minister, where the Minister took office. The 5 affiliated organizations were, the Military Affair section, Artillery section (Hangul: 포공국), the Accounting section, the Military law section, and the Military Medic section. Director of each sections were Major General or Colonel and Vice Minister simultaneously work as the Director of the Military Affair section. And the Director of the Military law section was Director of the Military Affair section. All sections except the Military medic section was First Class section while the Military medic section was Third Class section. In 1896, Military school was established and was affiliated to Military of Military. The school educated young officers. Following the establishment of the Board of Marshals, the Military Affair section was excluded from the ministry. In 1900, Military court was established and on 8 July 1904, Military factory, though in a small size, was established. One Major General or a colonel was attached to the factory as the director, and one Major or Lieutenant Colonel was attached as an adjutant. After the Japanese victory of the Russo-Japanese War, Japan started to minimize the Board of Marshals and the Ministry of Military. Under Japanese instructions, the Ministry of Military was changed by 12 military editors. In August 1904, the Artillery section was disestablished. After the disestablishment, Navy section (Hangul: 해방국, Hanja:海防局) was established on 27 September 1904. The Military Medic Section became 1st Class Section at the same day. Also, the Military Affair section was afflicted to the Ministry of Military. Lastly, the staff ministry and the Education Section was established. These reforms were under the supervision of Japanese influence, and 12 editors military system of the Imperial Korean Army, who were Gwon Jung-hyeon, Min Young-gi, Min Young-hwan, Yi Yun-yong, Yi Ji-yong, Gu Young-jo, Pak Chesoon, Um Jun-won, Hyeong Young-wun, Yi Byeong-mu, and Yi Hui-du.

In August 1907, Ministry of Military was minimized in size. There were only two subordinating sections which were, the Military Affair section, and the Accounting Section was the only sections.

=== Office of Minister ===
The Office of Minister supervised the Personnel affairs. The office administrated the appointment of officers, and awarding officers.

=== Military Affair Section ===
The Military Affair Section subordinated the Military Affair Discipline (軍事課), Cavalry Discipline (馬政課), and Foreign Affair Discipline (外國課). The Military Affair Discipline supervised the organization, tactics, deployment of units, education, and deployment of officers. Cavalry Discipline supervised the cavalry of the Army. Foreign Affair Discipline supervised the sending boarding students, translation of documents, and administrating documents.

=== Artillery Section ===
The Artillery Section administrated the artillery. The section subordinated Artillery Discipline, and Military Engineer Discipline. Artillery Discipline supervised artillery, and Military Engineer Discipline supervised military engineer. The section was disestablished in 1904.

==== Directors ====
Directors of the Artillery Section
Name	Rank	Start date	End date
Ryu Hyeok-ro	Lieutenant Colonel	1 April 1895 (Lunar Calendar)	3 November 1895 (Lunar Calendar)
Yi Byeong-wo	Major	4 January 1896	31 March 1896
Yi Min-geung	Major	22 April 1896	20 July 1900
Yi Gang-ha	Lieutenant Colonel	29 September 1900	4 February 1901
Yi Geon-young	Lieutenant Colonel	4 February 1901	15 March 1901
Yi Gi-dong	Lieutenant Colonel	16 March 1901	?
Kwon Chongsuck	Major	30 July 1901	?

=== Education Section ===
The Education Section administrated the military education. It had the Army College of Korean Empire as subordinating organization. The Ministry became Education Discipline on 28 August 1907, and became part of Military Affair section.

==== Directors ====
Directors of the Education Section
Name	Rank	Start date	End date
Baek Seong-gi	Major General	1 March 1905	17 June 1905
Gim Young-jin	Major General	22 June 1905	27 July 1905
Yi Byeong-mu	Major General	29 July 1905	?
No Baek-rin	Colonel	7 June 1907	19 June 1907

=== Staff Ministry ===
The staff ministry supervised all the affairs of military after its establishment in September 1904. The chief was Colonel General or Lieutenant General. There were two sections under the ministry. 1st Section supervised the tactics, location of bases, organizing units, and laws of war. The 2nd Section supervised foreign affairs, and intelligence. Also, the staff ministry subordinated Adjutant ministry, which supervised personnel affairs, and reporting of the staff ministry. Two adjutants were included in the ministry.

==== Ministers ====
Ministers of Staff Ministry
Name	Rank	Start date	End date
Yi Yun-yong	Lieutenant General	28 September 1904	
Yun Ung-nyeol	Lieutenant General	30 September 1904	1 January 1905

=== Military Medic Section ===
The Military Medic Section subordinated 1st Discipline and 2nd Discipline. 1st Discipline supervised the medic of army, and the second discipline was in charge of personnel affair of medics.

== Ministers ==
Minister of Military
Name	Rank	Start date	End date
Cho Hui-yeon	Lieutenant General	1 April 1895 (Lunar Calendar)	23 April 1895 (Lunar Calendar)
Shin Gi-seon	Lieutenant General		
Ahn Gyeong-su	Lieutenant General		
Cho Hui-yeon	Lieutenant General		
Yi Do-jae	Lieutenant General		
Cho Hui-yeon	Lieutenant General		
Yi Yun-yong	Lieutenant General		
Min Young-hwan	Lieutenant General		
Yi Jong-geon	Lieutenant General		
Min Young-gi	Lieutenant General		
Shim Sang-hun	Lieutenant General		
Min Young-hwan	Lieutenant General		
Shim Sang-hun	Lieutenant General		
Min Byeong-seok	Lieutenant General		
Yun Ung-nyeol	Lieutenant General		
Min Byeong-seok	Lieutenant General		
Min Young-cheol	Lieutenant General		
Shin Gi-seon	Lieutenant General		
Yi Geun-taek	Lieutenant General		
Yi Bong-ui	Lieutenant General		
Yun Ung-nyeol	Lieutenant General		
Min Young-cheol	Lieutenant General		
Yi Yong-ik	Lieutenant General		
Yun Ung-nyeol	Lieutenant General		
Min Young-gi	Lieutenant General		
Yi Yun-yong	Lieutenant General		
Yi Jong-geon	Lieutenant General		
Gwon Jung-hyeon	Lieutenant General		
Yi Yong-ik	Lieutenant General		
Shim Sang-hun	Lieutenant General		
Gwon Jung-hyeon	Lieutenant General		
Yi Geun-taek	Lieutenant General		
Gwon Jung-hyeon	Lieutenant General	25 November 1906	
Yi Byeong-mu	Lieutenant General	22 May 1907	Annexation of Korea
