= Yi Geun-ho =

Imperial Korean Army officer (1861–1923)

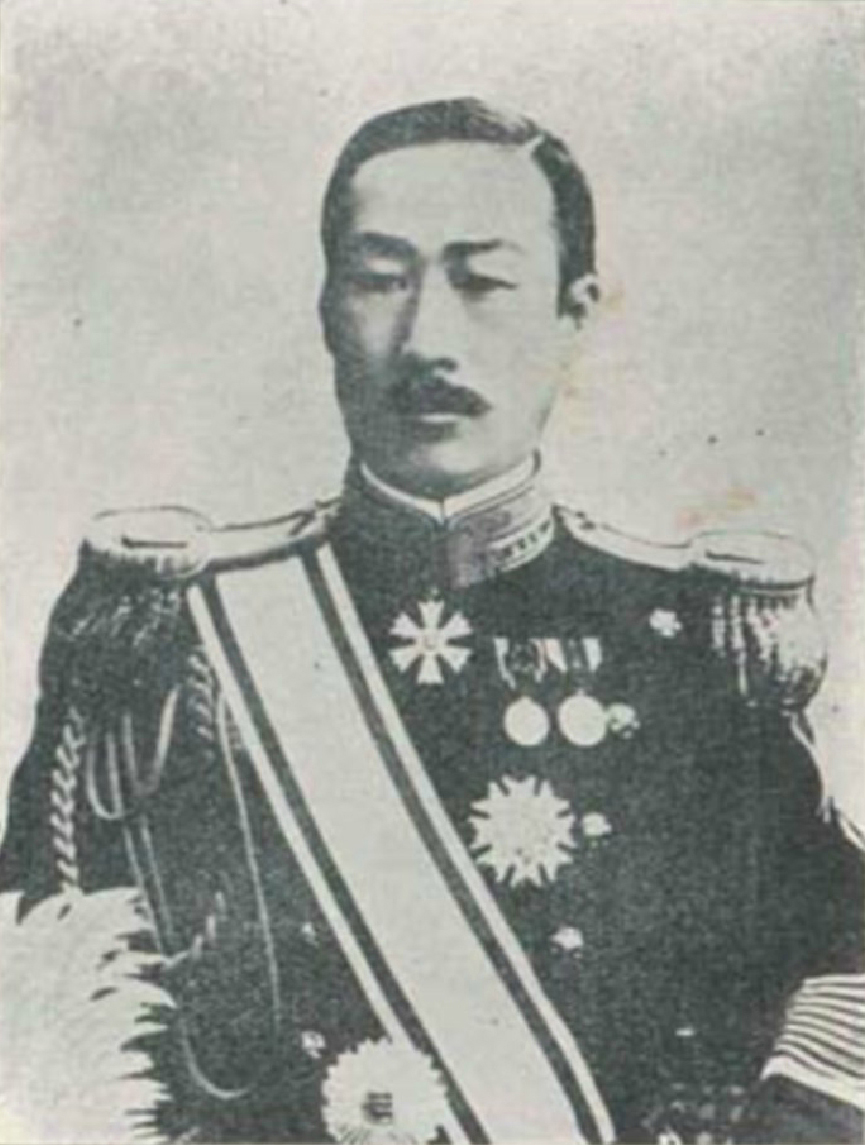
- Yi in military uniform

Gouverner of Gyeonggi Province
- In office 4 April 1905 – 20 May 1905
- Monarch: Gojong
- Preceded by: Choe Ik-hyeon
- Succeeded by: Yi Do-jae

Minister of Law
- Monarch: Gojong
- Preceded by: Yi Ji-yong
- Succeeded by: Pak Chesoon

Personal details
- Born: 1861 Hamgyong Province, Joseon Dynasty
- Died: 1 March 1923 (aged 62) Russian Empire
- Profession: Official

Military service
- Allegiance: Korean Empire
- Branch/service: Imperial Korean Army
- Years of service: 1901–1907
- Rank: Lieutenant General

Yi Geun-ho (Korean: 이근호; Hanja: 李根澔; 1861 – 1 March 1923) was an Imperial Korean Army officer, official and a Joseon Kazoku. He was one of the pro-Japanese politicians of the Korean Empire before its decline.

== Bibliography ==
Yi was born in 1861. His had two younger brothers: Yi Geun-taek, and Yi Geun-sang. He passed the civil service exam in March 1878. In 1887, Yi served as Seungji of Seungjeongwon, and Jasan Busa. In 1896, Yi was posted to the Ministry of Interior as the Director of Infectious diseases. As a politician, Yi agreed with the ideas of Gaewha party and participated the Independence Club as a committee member. After Gojong of Korea dissolved the People's joint association in 1898, Gojong needed to soothe the furious public. Gojong, in turn, appointed Yi as the head of police.

Other than being a politician, Yi was a businessman who actively participated in establishments of numerous companies. In 1899, Yi participated in the establishment of Daehan Chunil Bank as a promoter. Moreover, in 1900, Yi and Min Byeong-seok founded Jongro Manufacturing Factory. Yi participated in establishments of modern companies and banks. In 1902, Yi served in key positions of Korean officialdom. Holding important posts, he reformed the ancient economic system of Korea. In 1903, Yi was appointed as the director of Jigae, and made a plea about the problems of nickel coins. In 1906, Yi was appointed as Lieutenant General, and was appointed as head of Baejong Mugwanbu. The same year, he was posted as the director of Cheoldo section of Gungnaebu, which managed the royal estate of Korean Empire. Yi controlled Korean royal estate according to the request of Japanese empire.

When the Japanese Crown prince visited Korea, Yi participated in the Shinsahui, a Pro Japanese organization that welcomed the Crown prince. At the same year, furious public (mainly because of the Japan–Korea Treaty of 1907) burned Yi's house in Seongbuk-dong as he was one of the pro-Japanese officials.

After the annexation of Korea, Yi received title of Baron from the Japanese government. On 13 January 1911, he received 25,000 Won from the Japanese government. Yi died in March 1923, and his title was inherited to his son, Yi Dong-hun.

== Honours ==
Korean Empire

- Order of the Palgwae 2nd Class on 10 April 1906
- Order of the Palgwae 1st Class on 4 September 1906
