= Yi Geun-taek =

Korean official (1865–1919)

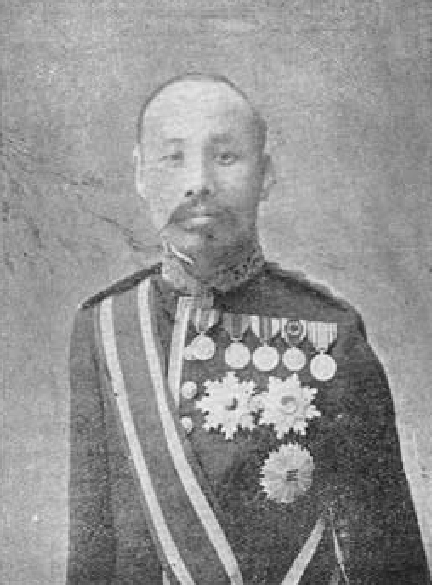
- Yi Geun-taek in 1910
- Born: September 30, 1865; Chungju, Joseon
- Died: December 17, 1919 (aged 54)
- Occupations: Politician, soldier
- Honours: Order of the Palgwae 1st &2nd Class; Order of the Rising Sun 1st Class

Yi Geun-taek (Korean: 이근택; Hanja: 李根澤; 30 September 1865 – 16 December 1919) was an official of Korean Empire who signed the Japan-Korea Treaty of 1905 as Minister of Military and became one of the Five Eulsa Traitors. He later became viscount after annexation of Korea.

== Biography ==
Yi was born on 30 September 1865. He had two older brothers, Yi Geun-ho and Yi Geun-taek. From 1872, Yi was home schooled. When Empress Myeongseong refuged to Cheongju because of Imo Incident, Yi was known and after the incident he went to Seoul and passed military examination of Gwageo. After the Gojong's internal exile to the Russian legation, Yi was appointed as battalion leader of 3rd Qinwi battalion. For merit of dismissal of the Independence Club in October 1898, Yi was appointed as mayor of Seoul, Chief of Police. Later, Yi was Observer of North Hamgyong Province, member of Jungchuwon, and staff of Gyeongbu. In October 1901, Yi was appointed as Major General and commander of military police. In March 1902, Yi was the acting chief of Pyeongriwon. On 25 August 1902, Yi became the acting commander of the Mixed Brigade. In September 1902, Yi became the director of persecutive of Board of Marshals. On 28 October 1902, Yi was the acting minister of military. Yi was against Yi Yong-ik, who did not do his duty as an official. He tried to remove Yi Yong-ik from the office. On 29 November 1902, Yi was removed from his office. On 3 May 1903, Yi became Lieutenant General. He tried to strengthen the army by buying naval ships. He had many doubts about having a secrete agreement with Russia. On 6 February 1904, Yi became director of finance of Board of Marshals. For the Japan–Korea Treaty of February 1904, Yi was sent as the representative of Korea. On 12 April 1905, Yi became the chief of equerry. He later became Minister of Nongsanggongbu and Minister of law later. On 26 September 1905, Yi was appointed as Minister of Military.

As Minister of Military and Law, Yi signed the Eulsa Treaty. With Yi Wan-yong, Yi was one of the ministers who agreed with the treaty. After the treaty he got 1st class of Order of the Rising Sun. Many officials tried to punish Yi with four other ministers who signed the treaty but it failed. Yi tried to censor the regiments of Jinwidae by appointing Yi Byeong-mu as the official for censoring. On 17 November 1906, Yi became the speaker of Junchuwon. In 1906, he was attacked with knife by an assassin when he was sleeping in his second wife's house. He was sent to hospital after being attacked. He recovered after months being in hospital. After his recovery, he was appointed as Baejongmuguanjang on 25 May 1907. He was removed from the army on 3 September 1907. After the annexation, Yi was ennobled as viscount and was part of the Jungchuwon of Korea under Japanese rule. He died on 17 December 1919. Eight days after his death, Sunjong of Korea gave him 250 won. He was one of the Chinilpa for signing the Eulsa Treaty. His properties was forfeited to the Korean government. However, Yi's older brother's grandson tried to get back Yi's property.

== Honours ==
Korean Empire

- Order of the Palgwae 2nd Class on 22 February 1905
- Order of the Palgwae 1st Class on 21 May 1905

Japanese Empire

- Order of the Rising Sun 1st Class
