= Yi Yong-ik =

Korean military officer (1854–1907)

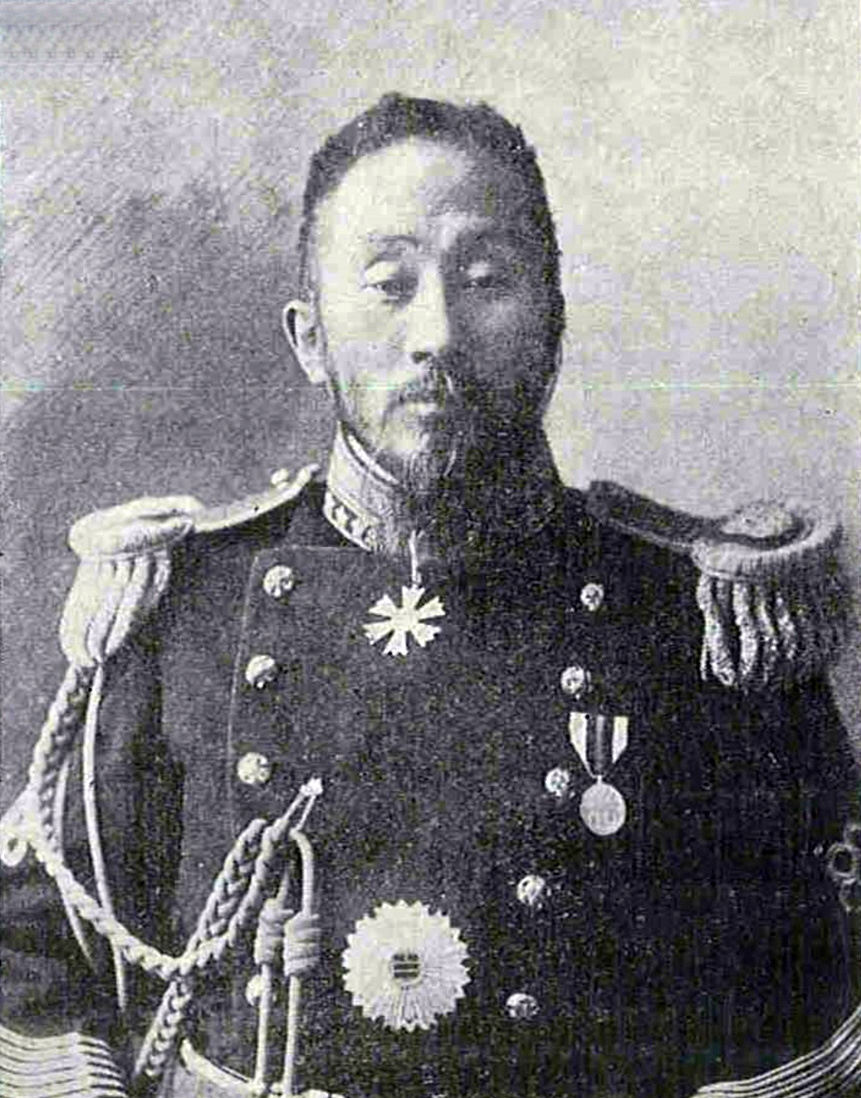
- Portrait of Yi, 1905

Korean Minister of Military (23rd)
- Monarch: Gojong
- Preceded by: Min Young-Cheol
- Succeeded by: Yun Ung-nyeol

Minister of Currency
- Monarch: Gojong
- Preceded by: Shim Sang-hun
- Succeeded by: Bak Jeongyang

Personal details
- Born: January 6, 1854 Myongchon County, Hamgyong Province, Joseon
- Died: February, 1907 (aged 52-53) Vladivostok, Russian Empire
- Profession: Official

Military service
- Allegiance: Korean Empire
- Branch/service: Imperial Korean Army
- Years of service: 1901–1907
- Rank: Lieutenant General

Yi Yong-ik (Korean: 이용익; Hanja: 李容翊; 6 January 1854 – February 1907), also known as Lee Yong-ik, was an official, and politician of the Korean Empire. As an official, Yi was very interested in education. He established Bosung College, which later became Korea University. As an officer he was also a lieutenant general of the Imperial Korean Army.

== Biography ==
On 6 January 1854, Yi was born in Myongchon County, Hamgyong Province, Joseon. His father, Yi Hak-shin, was an official who passed the civil service exam in 1837. His family was a poor, but Yi learned Chinese characters from Seodang. Before becoming an official, Yi was a peddler. During the Gapsin Coup, Yi took Min Young-ik, who was attacked by the Gaewha factions, to Horace Newton Allen. From this incident, Yi became close with Min Young-ik. In 1882, during Imo Incident he helped Min Young-ik to contact with Empress Myeongseong. After the Imo Incident, Gojong appointed him as Busa of Tanchon. In Tanchon, Yi discovered tremendous amount of golds, which aided the government financially.

For these accomplishments, Yi became a high ranked financial officer of the royal family. But in 1888, Yi was indict for the rebellion in Bukcheong. Yi enforced peasants to pay inordinate tax, provoking a rebellion. Because of the rebellion, Yi was banished to South Jeolla Province. On 28 April 1896, Yi was ordered to supervise mining of South Western area. After Gojong's internal exile to the Russian legation, Yi rapidly rose to power with Gojong's favor. However, such rapid rise led Yi to face challenges from the original officials.

From the Korean Empire period, Yi became the most important politicians of the Korean Empire. W.F. Sands described him as the manager of Korean royal estate, and keeper of the Korean Imperial stamp. Yi attempted to increase the royal estate through the Jeon-hwan Section. The Independence Club criticized his policy of increasing royal asset, addressing it as a method to prevent the progress of the country. During the 1900s, Yi was posted as important posts, such as manager of royal estate, Vice Minister of Ministry of Economy, Commander of Military Police, and Minister of Military. Yi prepared the economic reform based on loans. Gojong of Korea relied on Yi for loan, and under Gojong's support, Yi led the conference about loans with leading powers. In 1899, Yi asked to Hayashi Gonsuke for 1 million won loan. However the contract with the Japanese government was expired. Yi asked American Leigh S. J. Hunt for 5 million Yen loan for mines in Korea. Hunt provided 2 million Yen loan for five mines that were run by Yi, and 3 million Yen loan for twenty mines under Gungnaebu. In January 1900, Yi started conferences about loan with the Russian minister in Korea. However, Russia did not provide any loan considering Korea's unstable status. When he realized getting loan from Russia was impossible, he met French minister in Korea, Victor Collin de Plancy for loan. The Russian foreign minister Vladimir Lamsdorf agreed with the French loan, claiming that it would restrain the British, and Japanese influence in Korea. In May 1901, Yi received 3 million Won loan from the Mitsui & Co. for Ginseng as guarantee. In 1902, Yi was appointed as the Minister of Economy, and started economic reform. These reforms included minting nickel coins which worthed 5 Jeon. Initiating these reforms, Yi was able to bring great revenue to the government; however, this also led to a serious inflation. Another method that Yi used was giving out rights of mining and logging. At the dawn of the Russo-Japanese War, Yi persuaded King Gojong to aver the neutrality of Korea.

Before the Russo-Japanese War, Yi was appointed as many major military positions, such as the Minister of Military and Departmental Leader of Board of Marshals. He was importing weapons to prepare for the imminent war. Japanese recognized Yi as an impediment to their plot; they snatched Yi on 22 February 1904, which was two weeks after the start of the war. Right after Yi was snatched, Japan–Korea Treaty of February 1904 was signed. The Japanese government also tried to kidnap other anti-Japanese politicians such as Gil Young-su, Yi Hak-gyun, and Hyeon Sang-geon, but failed. Even being banished, Yi learned about new technology and experienced them. He bought a printer, which later helped the establishments of many schools. Upon his arrival, Yi started the educational enlightenment movement; he established the Bosung College (which would later become Korea University) by being supported from the government. In May 1905, Yi was appointed as the minister of Military. Through this appointment, Yi attempted to return to the politics. But, growing Japanese power in Korea was a threat to him. After Japan–Korea Treaty of 1905 was signed, Yi was sent to France by orders of Gojong. However, he was found in China by Japanese. Han Kyu-seol indicted him of being not present when he was the Minister of Military. He lost his position of the minister, and his Order of Taegeuk was confiscated. Yi exiled to Shanghai in May 1905, and traveled to Russia and met Russian foreign minister Vladimir Lamsdorf for protection of Korean autonomy with Korean minister in Russia Yi Bum-jin in return of giving some rights to Russia. However, Russia already agreed with the Japanese colonization of Korea and was in the midst of turmoil because of the Russian Revolution of 1905; therefore, Yi was not able to make a remarkable success. Soon, Yi returned to Shanghai and emigrated to Vladivostok, where he suddenly died in February 1907. Yi's final words to Gojong was an advice about concentration to education, and recovering the national sovereignty. Gojong pardoned every punishment done to Yi. Gojong gave Yi posthumous name of Ch'ungsuk (충숙; 忠肅).

== Trivia ==
Yi had about 1,000,000 Won of deposit in his bank account but, what he gave to his son, Yi Jong-ho, was only 330,000 Won. Japanese interrupted his son to get 1,000,000 Won from his account. As a result, his son sued the Japanese bank. But, Yi died in 1932. This money is not returned to Yi's descendants until now.
