= Yi Jong-geon =

Korean general (1843–1930)

Lee Jong-geon
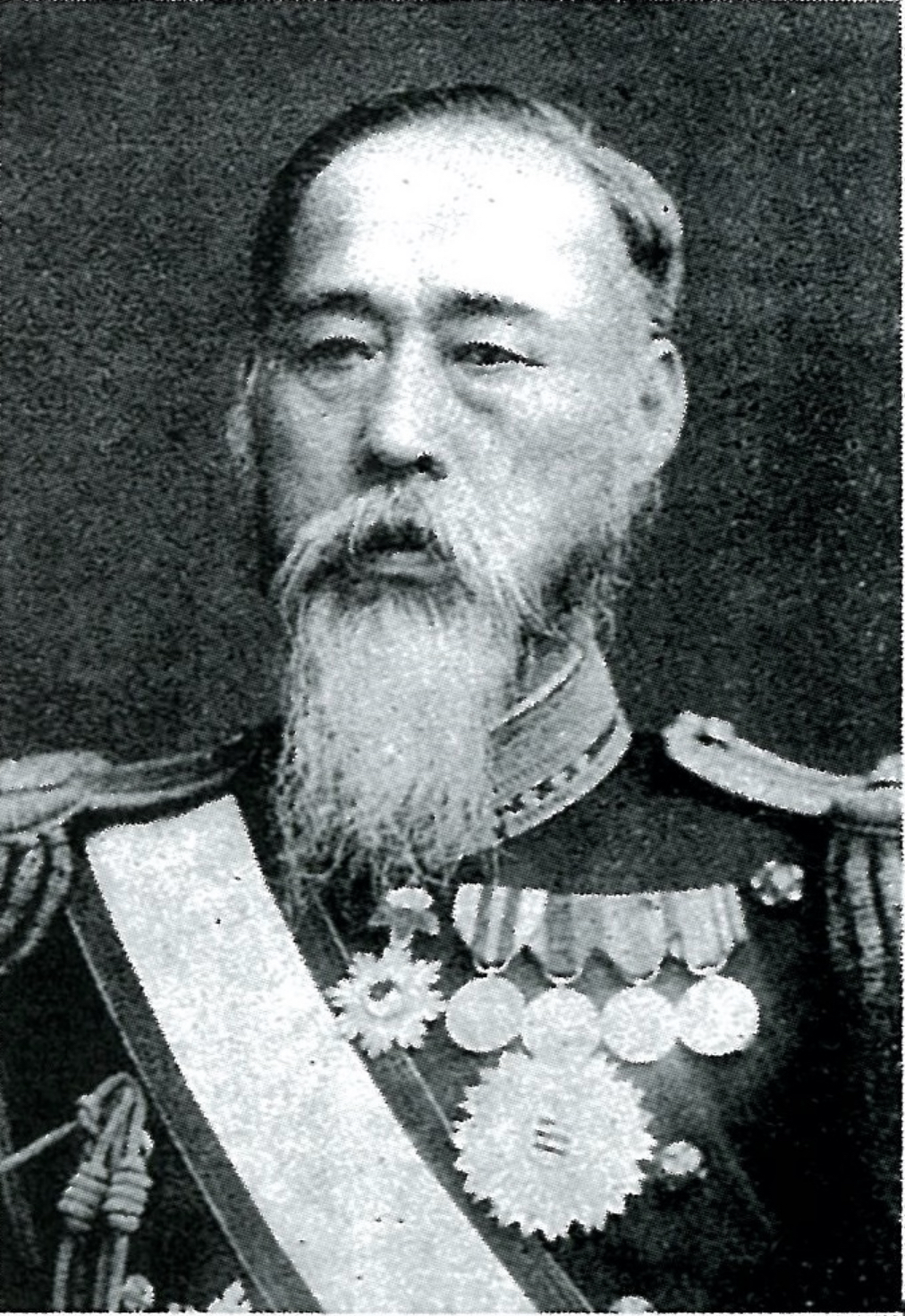
- Born: 1843; Joseon
- Died: 1930 (aged 86–87) Korea, Empire of Japan
- Allegiance: Joseon; Korean Empire; Japanese Empire
- Branch: Army
- Service years: 1897–1907
- Rank: Lieutenant general
- Commands: Special Officer of Gungnaebu; Minister of Military (9th); Special Officer of Gungnaebu; Minister of Military (27th)

Yi Jong-geon (Korean: 이종건; Hanja: 李鍾健; 1843–1930) was a lieutenant-general of the Imperial Korean Army. He was ennobled as Baron of Japan during the Korea under Japanese rule. After March First Movement, Yi tried to return his title but he failed.

== Biography ==
He was born in 1843 as the son of Yi Gue-jeong and was adopted to Yi Gue-cheol. In 1859, Yi passed the military examination Gwageo. During the Imo Incident, Yi executed some culprits related to the coup. For this merit, Yi rose his rank under the reign of Yeoheung Min clan during 1880s. As a member of Gaewha clique, Yi cooperated with Bak Jeongyang and Kim Hong-jip but ended up having struggles.

Upon Gojong's return from the Russian legation, Yi rose into power as commander of police, and Mayor of Seoul. On 1 October 1897, Yi was promoted to Lieutenant general, and appointed as minister of military of Shim Soon-taek cabinet. In 1901, Yi was commissioned as the director of Military affair section of Board of Marshals, and wrote a guide about Army Ceremony. About the Korean invasion of Manchuria, Yi justified the deployment Korean forces in Manchuria is for being a solution for continuous Chinese banditry.

In 1903, Yi was appointed as special officer of Gungnaebu. He was also appointed as minister of military in 1905. On 29 July 1906, Yi was appointed as Vice Speaker of Junchuwon. On 31 May 1907, Yi was appointed as chief of equerry replacing Cho Tong-yun. On 13 September 1907, Yi retired from the army.

In 1910, Yi received the title of baron from the Empire of Japan. After March First Movement, Yi felt guilty about owning a title, and attempted to return it. However, his attempt failed; he lived until 1930 and died in Korea under Japanese rule.

For his attempt to return the title, Yi is not considered as Korean collaborators to Imperial Japanese rule, despite receiving a title after annexation.

== Honours ==
Korean Empire

- Order of the Palgwae 3rd Class in 1901

Military offices
Preceded by Min Young-hwan	Military Minister of Korean Empire (9th)	Succeeded by Min Young-gi
Preceded by Yi Yun-yong	Military Minister of Korean Empire (27th)	Succeeded by Gwon Jung-hyeon
