= Military Academy of the Korean Empire =

1896–1909 military academy in Seoul

Military Academy of the Korean Empire was a military academy of the Korean Empire established in 1896. However, as a result of shrink in military force of Imperial Korea by Japanese influence, the academy was disbanded in 1909.

== Establishment ==
After the establishment of Hunryeondae as part of the Gabo Reform, Hunryeondae Military Academy was established to educate officers. However, after the assassination of Queen Min, Hunryeondae and the military academy was dissolved too in September 1895. The need for a military academy led to the establishment of Military Academy of Korean Empire. On 11 January 1896, Gojong established the academy with his imperial decree.

== Korean Empire ==
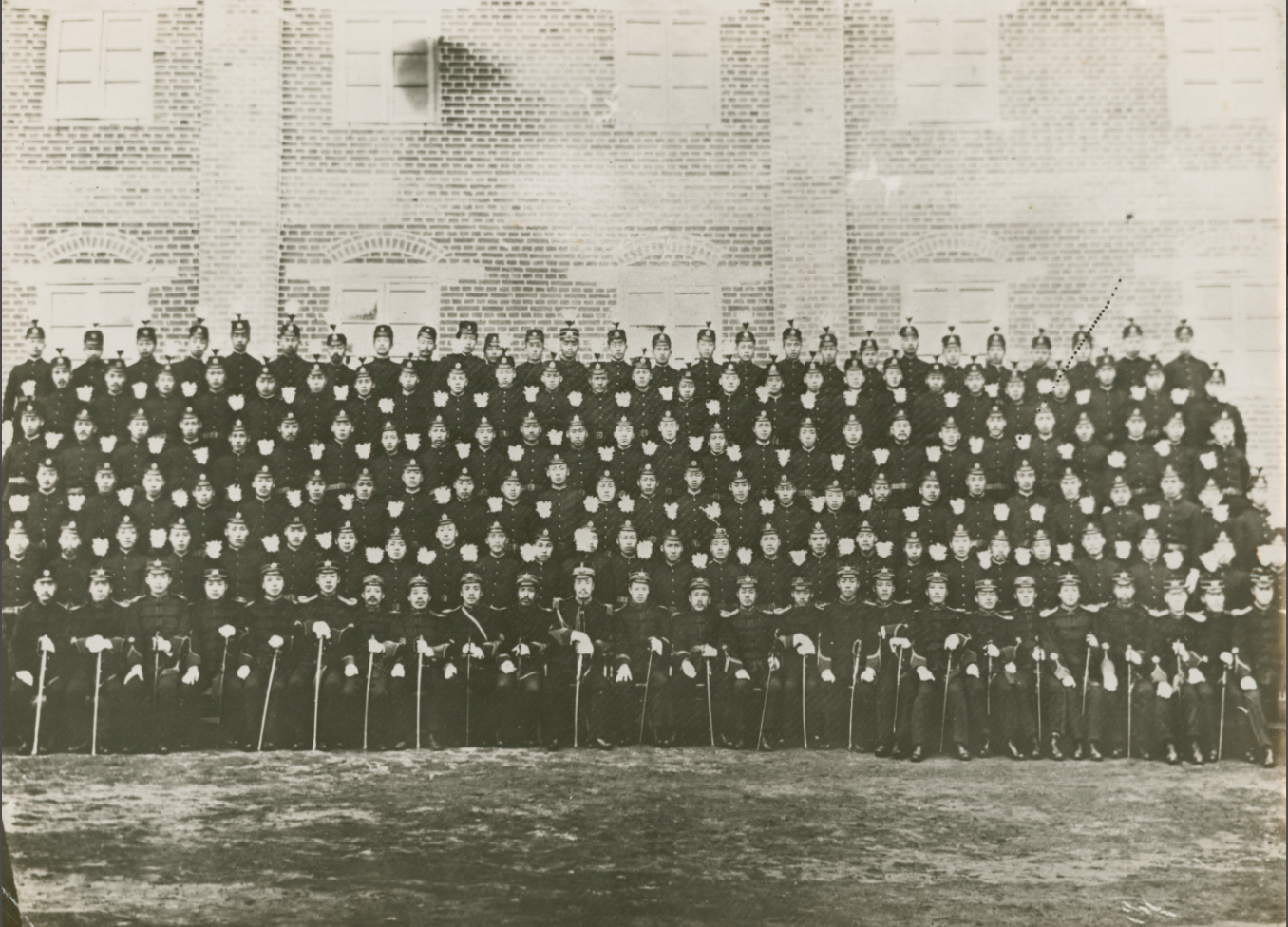
Cadets and officers of the Military Academy before 1900

However, after the Gojong's exile to the Russian legation, the military academy was not able to operate properly as an academy. After Gojong's return to the palace, Minister of Military Yi Jong-geon asked for the establishment of the military academy in March 1898. By the imperial decree, old academy, that was established in 1896 was disbanded in May 1898. On 1 July 1898, the Military Academy was properly established and was subordinated to the Ministry of Military. 200 cadets were selected, and education of cadets started. On 22 June 1899, the academy became subordinated to the Board of Marshals as an effort of Gojong solidifying the military of Korea. In January 1900, first exam for graduation. First 128 graduates were commissioned as Second lieutenant after the exam.

However, as the Japanese influence increased in Korea following the Japan–Korea Treaty of February 1904, the Board of Marshals was dissolved and the academy became an affiliated organization of Education section of the Ministry of Military. From 1904, cadets were limited to the graduates of Yuneon Military Academy, and the academy included a 3-year curriculum. Following the dissolution of the Imperial Korean Army in August 1907, the Military Academy was minimized in size that number of new cadets became 15. The academy was finally disbanded in September 1909. Remaining cadets were sent to Imperial Japanese Army Academy.

== Organization and graduates ==
The staff of the academy consisted of 1 major as the principal, 1 adjutant, 1 surgeon, 1 head instructor, 3 instructors, and 8 assistants. Mostly, principal was selected from military officers, who were educated abroad. Cadets were healthy and wise 20–30 years old, who got a recommendation from an officer. 495 cadets were commissioned as officer after their graduation. 291 out of 495 commissioned cadets were deployed in Jinwidae or Siwidae. Even though the academy was an academy for education of nationalist officers, not all of the graduates were Nationalists. This was because some sons of Yangbans saw entering the academy as a way for an assured career. Despite not every cadet was motivated by their nationalist sentiment, many graduates of the academy joined the Righteous army, and opposed Japanese colonization. Leaders of independence movements such as Yi Dong-hwi, Park Seung-hwan, Kim Chwa-chin, Shin Pal-gyun, Ryu Dong-ryeol, and Ji Cheong-cheon were all graduates of the academy. Some of the graduates became instructors of the Shinhung Military Academy.
