= Min Sang-ho =

Korean politician (1870–1933)

Min Sang-ho 민상호
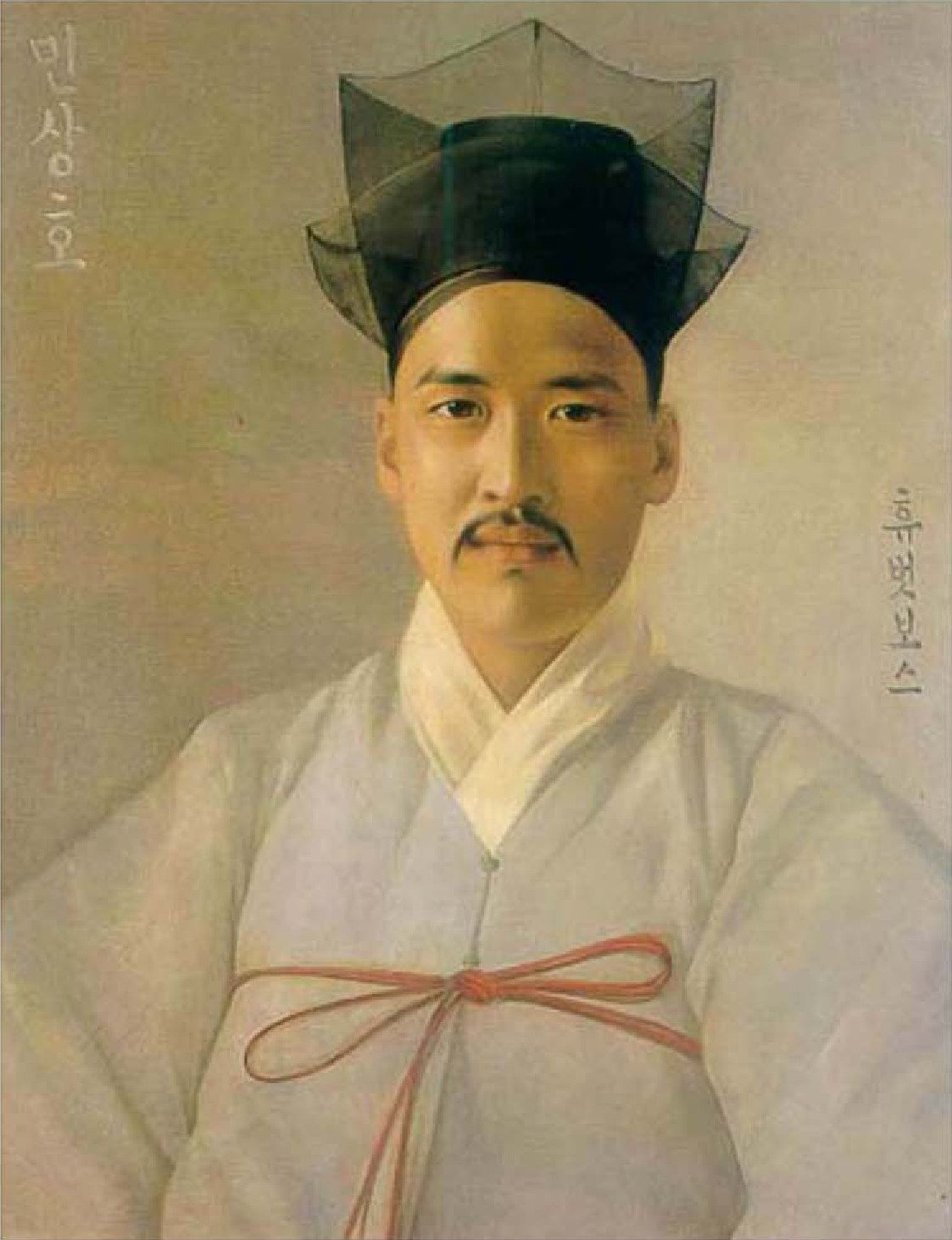
- Portrait drawn by Hubert Vos
- Born: 1870; Seoul, Joseon
- Died: 1933 (aged 62–63); Korea, Empire of Japan
- Occupation: Politician

Min Sang-ho (Korean: 민상호; Hanja: 閔商鎬, 1870–1933) was a Korean official and soldier of the Korean Empire. He was part of the Chinilpa because he was ennobled as baron after annexation.

== Life ==
Min Sang-ho was born in 1870 as the son of Min Chi-uk as a member of Yeoheung Min clan in Seoul. He was educated in his home then, Dongmun-hak. In 1885, he went to Shanghai for studying and received education at the Maryland University. By recommendation of Bak Jeongyang, Min returned to Korea and was posted in Naemubu. After passing the Gwageo literary exam, Min entered the officialdom as Suchan (修撰). In 1894, Min became Waemu Cham-ui. During the Donghak Peasant Revolution, Min was sent to stop the Japanese army, under the command of Ōtori Keisuke, from entering Seoul. However, the Japanese army left Incheon even before Min arrived. Form 1897 for 19 months, Min was sent to United Kingdom of Great Britain, Germany, Russia, Italy, France, and Austria-Hungary as an ambassador. Along with Min Young-hwan, Yun Chi-ho, and Yi Sang-jae, Min was recognized as one of the Pro-American politicians.

In October 1898, Min was appointed as Vice minister of Ministry of Foreign Affairs. When Prince Henry of Prussia visited Incheon, Min was one of the Korean officials who greeted him in Incheon and, he was the translator for banquet. On 21 March 1900, Min became Vice Minister of Nongsanggongbu. And on 26 March 1900, Min was appointed as Chongpan of Imperial Department of Communications. On 16 September 1902, Min was appointed as Major General. On 9 March 1904, Min replaced Lee Hak-gyun as the chief of military court. He served as Observer of Gangwon Province, then President of Jaedoguk, then Observer of Gyeonggi Province, then special official of Gungnaebu in the year of 1906. In 1907, Min was Jihugak of Gyujanggak and Principle of Suhakwon.

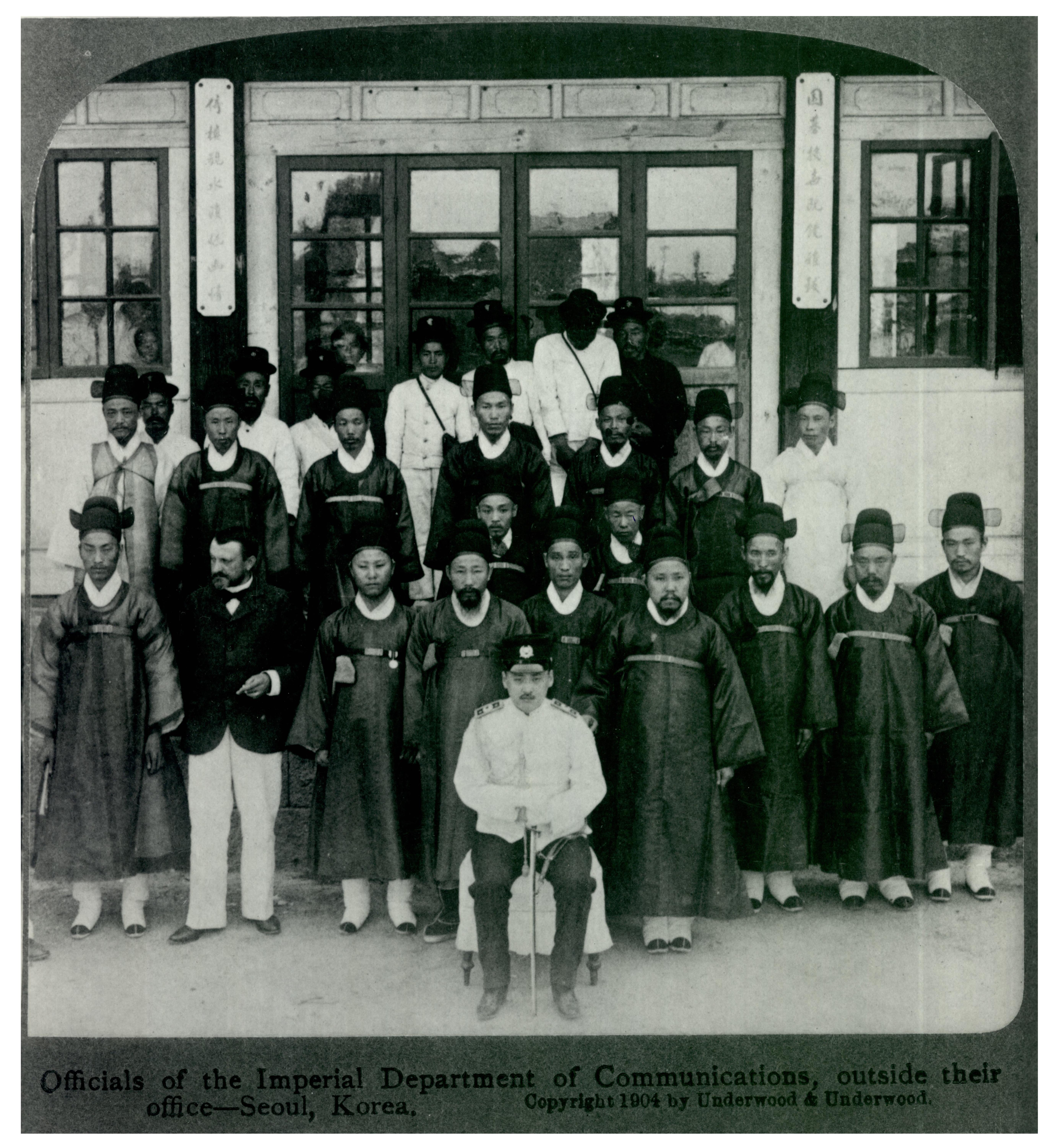
Min Sang-ho with officers of the Imperial Department of Communication

From 1908, Min became a pro Japanese official, that he joined Dongyang organization which supported the colonization of Taiwan and Korea, and donated 50 Won to the organization. When Ernest Bethell died, Min donated 100 Won to build his statue. On 1 October 1910, Min was appointed as a member of Junchuwon. He was entitled as Baron on 10 October 1910, and received 25,000 Won in January 1911 for his merit of colonization. In 1912 he received Decoration for Colonization of Korea. He died in 1933 in Korea.

Min was recorded as one of the Korean collaborators to the Imperial Japanese colonization in 2004 according to the presidential decree no. 18571.

== Honours ==
Korean Empire

- Order of the Taegeuk 3rd Class in 1901
- Order of the Taegeuk 2nd Class in 1904

Japanese Empire

- Decoration for Colonization of Korea in 1912
- Order of the Rising Sun 2nd Class in June 1927
