= Yun Yŏngnyŏl =

Korean politician (1854–1939)

Yun Yŏngnyŏl 윤영렬
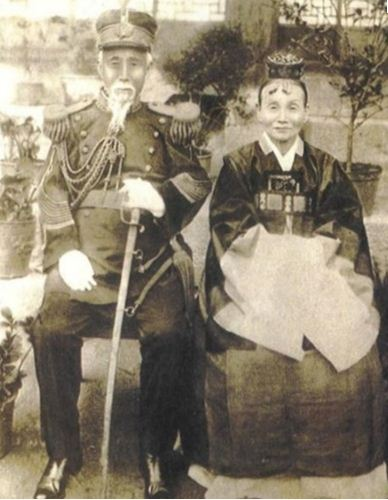
- Yun with his Wife

Personal details
- Born: 15 April 1854 Joseon
- Died: 4 November 1939 (aged 85) Korea under Japanese rule
- Profession: General officer and politician

Military service
- Allegiance: Korean Empire
- Branch/service: Imperial Korean Army
- Years of service: 1898–1907
- Rank: Major General

Korean name
- Hangul: 윤영렬
- Hanja: 尹英烈
- RR: Yun Yeongryeol
- MR: Yun Yŏngnyŏl

Art name
- Hangul: 연구, 경재
- Hanja: 蓮龜, 敬齎
- RR: Yeongu, Gyeongjae
- MR: Yŏn'gu, Kyŏngjae

Courtesy name
- Hangul: 백웅
- Hanja: 白熊
- RR: Baekung
- MR: Paegung

Yun Yŏngnyŏl (Korean: 윤영렬; 1854–1939) was a Korean politician and soldier of the Joseon and Korean Empire periods. He was the uncle of Yun Ch'iho, the father of Yun Chi-young, and the grandfather of Yun Po-sun, the second President of South Korea. His art name was either Yŏn'gu (연구; 蓮龜) or Kyŏngjae (경재; 敬齎).

== Biography ==
Yun was born in 1854 as a member of Haepyeong Yun clan. He passed the military examination of Gwageo in 1878. When the Donghak Peasant Revolution started, Yun was deployed in Jeolla Province. He participated in suppressing the revolution.

On 30 May 1897, Yun was appointed as keeper of Ansung. He started his military career as being appointed as First lieutenant on 21 January 1898. Yun was assessed as a good keeper who helped people by preventing crimes. On 26 February 1904, Yun was promoted to Captain and was appointed as Keeper of Nampo. On 4 April 1904, Yun became Yangho Jippogwan. As Yangho Jippogwan, Yun was ordered to arrest the bandits in Jeolla Province. On 13 April 1905, Yun was promoted to Major and as Lieutenant Colonel in November. He got a prize from government for his merit in May 1906. On 20 July 1906, Yun became a colonel. By the request of Minister of Military, Yi Geun-taek, Yun was awarded for his merits again in 1906. Yun was promoted to Major General on 2 September 1906. In 1907, Yun was removed from service since he did not have any placement. After Japan–Korea Treaty of 1910 was signed, Yun came back to his home. He did not work as an official. He refused a title from the Japanese Government. On 2 September 1910, Yun with his older brother, Yun Ung-nyeol, they burned all the documents about slave trades from their family. He died on 4 November 1939 in Asan, his hometown.
