= Yi Yun-yong (general) =

Imperial Korean general (1855–1938)

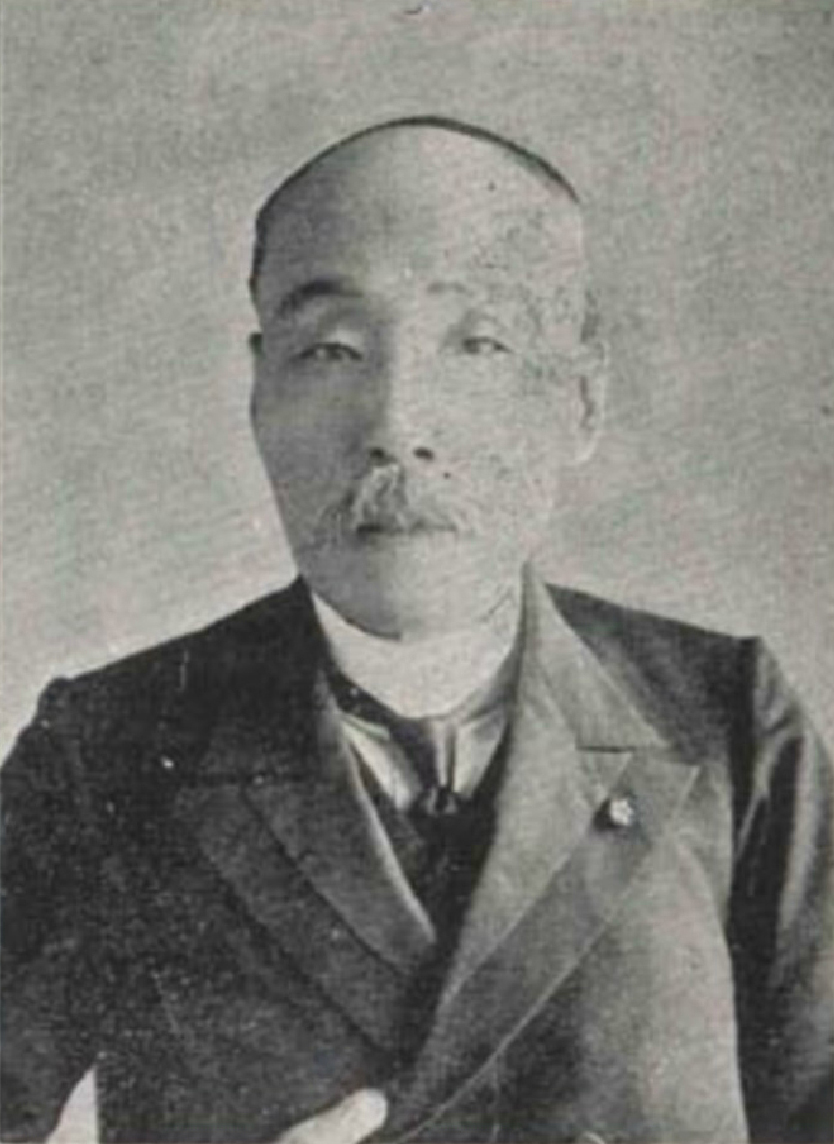

Minister of Military
- Monarch: Gojong
- Preceded by: Cho Hui-yeon
- Succeeded by: Min Young-hwan

Personal details
- Born: September 5, 1855 Pyongyang, Pyongan Province, Joseon
- Died: September 8, 1938 (aged 83) Korea, Empire of Japan
- Profession: Official, and Officer

Military service
- Allegiance: Korean Empire
- Branch/service: Imperial Korean Army
- Years of service: 1896–1907
- Rank: Lieutenant General

Yi Yun-yong (Korean: 이윤용; Hanja: 李允用; 5 September 1855 – 8 September 1938) was an Imperial Korean official and general. He is considered as a collaborator to Imperial Japan or Chinilpa.

== Biography ==
Yi was born on in Pyongyang. He was posted to Yijo as a member of Don-Nyeong Bu in 1868. A year after, Yi appointed as Byeolgunjik, then Minister of Economy in 1894. Same year, he was appointed as the chief of police. During his term, he oppressed Yi Jun-yong's coup, making Heungseon Daewongun to despise him. Yi was one of those who rose to high position despite being a seoeol. After the assassination of Empress Myeongseong, Yi was considered as an anti-Japanese politician and lost his position with Ye Wanyong, Yi Bum-jin, and Min Sang-ho. Furthermore, his participation in the Chunsaeng Gate incident made him to exile to the American legation with other pro-American politicians. Later, he transformed into a pro-Russian politician and led Gojong's internal exile to the Russian legation. Like his younger brother, he was a supporter of the Independence Club, that he sponsored building Independence Gate. In October 1896, Yi received Dmitry Putyata as Russian instructors. He requested them to train 2,200 Korean personnels. Soon, Min Young-hwan, who actually brought these instructors, replaced him as the next Minister of Military. Other than being an official, Yi was also a businessman. In order to protect the rights of navigation in Incheon, Yi established a shipping firm. This enterprise was the first Korean shipping company had total of 5 ships that interconnected many Korean ports. During the Russo-Japanese War, however, four of the ships of the firm were exploited by Japanese for transporting their forces or their supplies.

However, by late 1900s, Yi became a pro Japanese collaborator. In 1909, Yi negotiated with growing righteous army and lobbied them with 200,000 Won. He joined numerous pro Japanese organizations such as the GukCi Yushidan. After the annexation, Yi received title of Baron from the Japanese government. He continued his life as a pro-Japanese collaborator. He joined many pro-Japanese organization; Yi became an instructor of Buddhism Ongho Organization in 1917, and Daejeong Chinmok Hui in 1921. On 2 November 1928, Yi was appointed as a member of Jungchuwon of Japanese colonial government, and received 3,000 Won each year. He died in 1938, and his grandson received his title as baron.
