= Kim Kajin =

Korean politician (1846–1922)

Kim Kajin 김가진 金嘉鎭
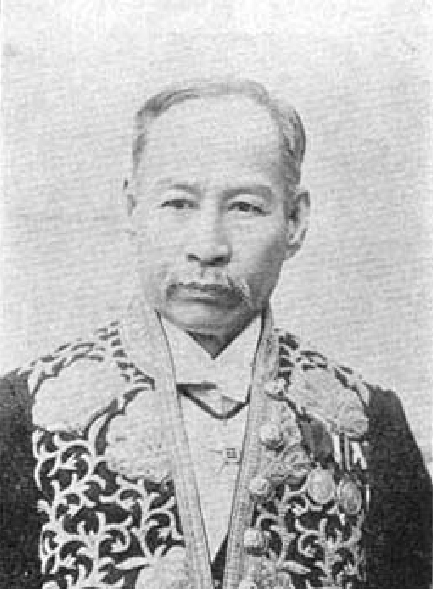
- Portrait of Kim Kajin

Minister of Agriculture, Industry and Commerce
- In office 1st day, 4th month of 1895 – 17th day, 8th month of 1895
- Monarch: Gojong of Korea
- Preceded by: Formation
- Succeeded by: Yi Bum-jin

Minister of Agriculture, Industry and Commerce
- In office 8 March 1904 – 8 March 1904
- Monarch: Gojong of Korea
- Preceded by: Shim Sang-hun
- Succeeded by: Yi Geun-myeong

Minister of Justice
- In office 15 September 1904 – ?
- Monarch: Gojong of Korea
- Preceded by: Pak Chesoon
- Succeeded by: Gwon Jung-hyeon

Personal details
- Born: 1846 Joseon
- Died: 4 July 1923 (aged 76–77) Shanghai, Republic of China

Korean name
- Hangul: 김가진
- Hanja: 金嘉鎭
- RR: Gim Gajin
- MR: Kim Kajin

Courtesy name
- Hangul: 동농
- Hanja: 東農
- RR: Dongnong
- MR: Tongnong

Kim Kajin (Korean: 김가진; Hanja: 金嘉鎭; 1846 – 4 July 1923) was an Imperial Korean politician, diplomat and an independence activist during Korea under Japanese rule.

== Biography ==
Kim was born in 1846. His father was Kim Ŭnggyun (김응균; 金應均) a member of Andong Kim clan that served as the Yejo Minister.

Despite being born into a prestigious family, he was an illegitimate child borne from a kisaeng. Despite his background, he started his career as Chamseogwan of Royal library. In 1886, Kim passed Gwageo literary examination. On the 16th day, 5th month of 1887 (Korean calendar), Kim was appointed as minister sent to Tokyo and returned to Korea on the 21st, 9th month of 1891.

Kim was an ardent supporter of reform. When the Japanese forces stationed in Seoul, Gim was part of the plot of bringing back Heungseon Daewongun into power as a prime minister, embarking the age without Yeoheung Min clan. Daewongun also wanted to use Kim in the new government as a member of progressive fraction.

Later, Kim found his way towards prominency. Kim was appointed as Minister of agriculture, Industry and Commerce on the 1st day, 4th month of 1895. Kim resigned his position on the 17th day, 8th month of 1895. In August 1895, Kim was appointed as 1st Class member of Junchuwon. On 27 August 1895, Kim was appointed as the Korean envoy sent to Japan. Kim resigned from his office on 1 February 1896. He was appointed as 1st class member of the Junchuwon. In July 1896, Kim registered in the newly formed Independence Club.

Kim served the Korean Empire in various posts such as Speaker of the Jungchuwon, and Special Official of Gungnaebu. After the Japan–Korea Treaty of 1905 was signed, Kim showed his disapproval. In response, on 8 May 1906, Kim was demoted to the Observer of the South Chungcheong Province. To fend off the Japanese colonization, Kim became the president of Daehan Organizations. In 1907, he was appointed as Gyujanggak Jaehak and retired from the officialdom same year.

After the annexation of Korea, Kim was ennobled as Baron, starting his age as a Korean collaborators with the Empire of Japan. Yet his pro-Japanese collaboration did not last long. During the March 1st Movement, Kim participated as one of the representatives of Korea. After the March 1st Movement, Kim became the president of Taedongdan. On 19 October 1919, Kim fled to Shanghai with Yi Jong-uk, an agent from the Korean Provisional Government to Seoul. These two secretly arrived at Shanghai with Kim disguising himself as a man living in countryside. Kim's refuge was successful, helped the Taedongdan to act in Shanghai. After Taedongdan was dissolved, Kim joined the Korean Provisional Government. He died in Shanghai on 4 July 1922.

== Honors ==
Korean Empire

- Order of the Palgwae 2nd Class on 11 April 1905
