= Yi Byeong-mu =

Korean politician (1864–1926)

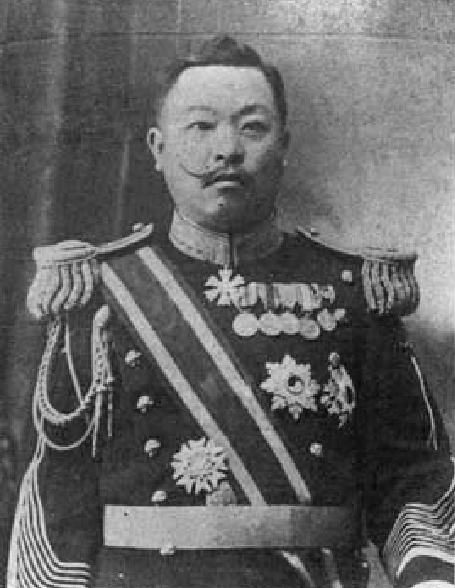
- Born: 8 February 1864; Seoul, Joseon
- Died: 6 December 1926 (aged 62); Korea, Empire of Japan
- Military career
- Allegiance: Joseon; Korean Empire
- Branch: Imperial Korean Army
- Service years: 1896–1910
- Rank: Lieutenant General
- Awards: Order of the Taegeuk 2nd Class; Order of the Plum Blossom

Yi Byeong-mu (Korean: 이병무; Hanja: 李秉武; 8 February 1864 – 6 December 1926) was a politician of the Korean Empire who agreed with Japan–Korea Treaty of 1907, and Japan–Korea Treaty of 1910. He was one of the most notable Chinilpa.

== Biography ==
On 8 February 1864, Yi was born as a member of Jeonju Yi clan. In 1886, Yi passed the military examination of Gwageo. As an aide-de-camp of Prince Yi Kang, Yi visited the Empire of Japan. Yi got educated in the Japanese Non-commissioned officer school and Imperial Japanese Army Academy. After the graduation, Yi returned to Korea and was appointed as Captain. He was one of the teachers of the Military Academy of Korean Empire. On 19 June 1897, Yi was promoted to the rank of Major. In 1899, Yi became a company leader of Jibangdae. Then in 1900, Yi became a company leader of Jinwidae. On 28 July 1900, Yi became company leader of Jinwi 5th Brigade 2 Company. But he was removed on 15 October 1900 when he told secrets of the country to a Japanese. From 1902, Yi was exiled. But on 7 June 1904, during the Russo-Japanese War, Yi returned to office.

After return to office, he became a teacher of military academy. On 29 September 1904, Yi was promoted to lieutenant colonel. At the same time, Yi became the headmaster of Military Academy of Korean Empire. On 13 April 1905, Yi was promoted to colonel, and major general on 13 December 1905. As a major general, Yi became the chairman of military education, which was part of the Ministry of Military. On 15 February 1906, Lee awarded 3rd class of Order of the Palgwae. With Yi Jaewan, Yi visited Empire of Japan as an ambassador. On 1 March 1906, Yi got 2nd class of Order of the Sacred Treasure. On 4 March, Yi returned to Korea. On 22 May 1907, Yi became Minister of Military and a Lieutenant General. He participated in the abdication of Gojong of Korea. On July 24, 1907, Yi signed the Japan–Korea Treaty of 1907. On 3 September 1907, Yi removed all the personnels of Imperial Korean Army who does not have any position. On 9 September 1907, Yi awarded Order of the Taegeuk 2nd class. He ordered suppression of Righteous army of Korea. On 5 October 1908, Yi visited Tokyo to meet Yi Un in order to celebrate his birthday. He also signed the Japan–Korea Treaty of 1910.

After the annexation of Korea, Yi got 50,000 won from the Japanese Government for the annexation. He was part of the Red cross of Empire of Japan.

== Honours ==
Korean Empire

- Order of the Palgwae 3rd Class in January 1906
- Order of the Taegeuk 2nd Class in 1907
- Order of the Taegeuk 1st Class in 1907
- Order of the Plum Blossom in 1910

Empire of Japan

- Order of the Sacred Treasure 2nd Class in March 1906
- Order of the Rising Sun 1st Class in 1907
