= Order of the Taegeuk =

Order of the Taegeuk 태극장 太極章
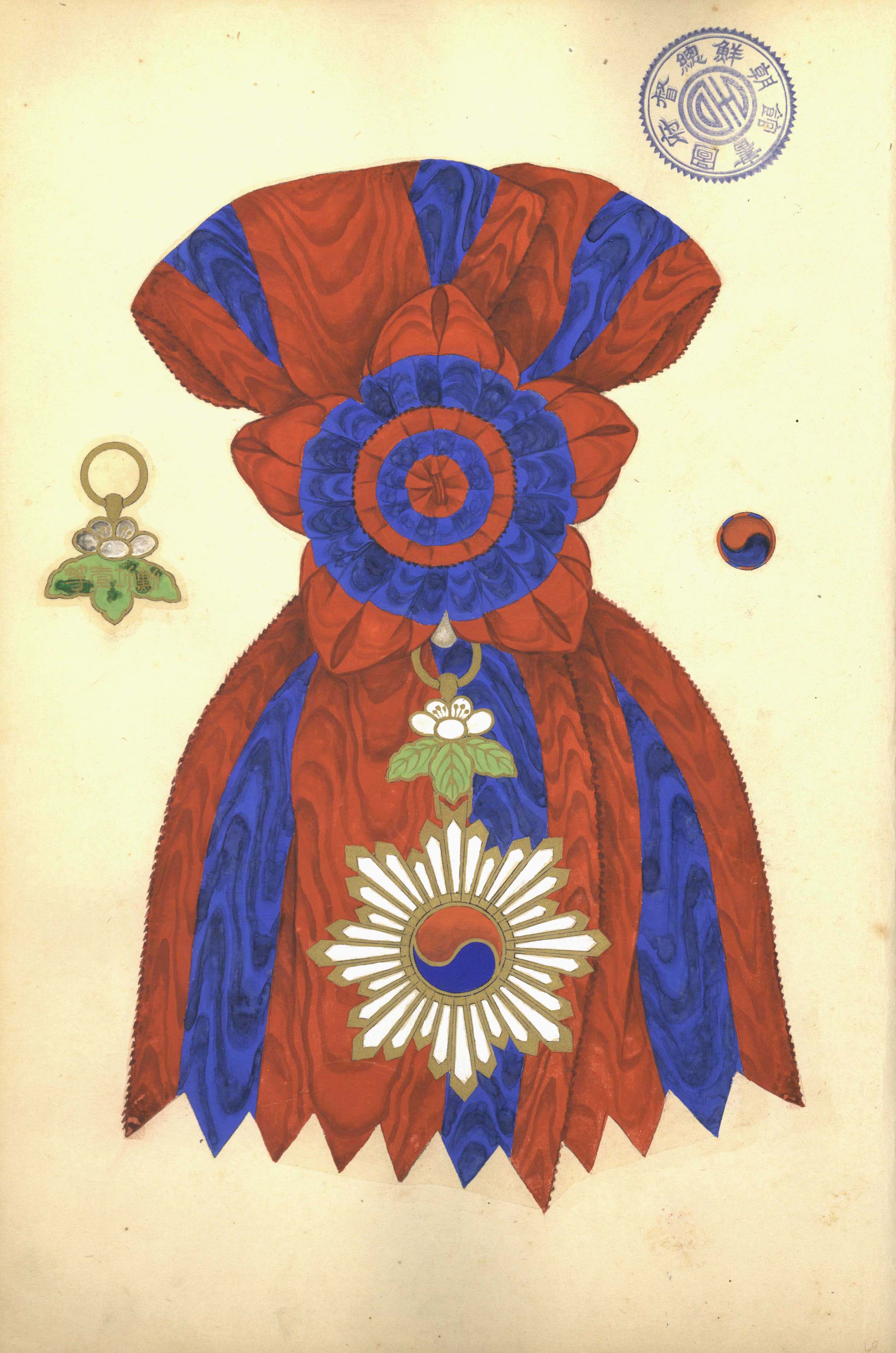
- 1st Class of the Order
- Type: Dynastic order
- Awarded for: Merit
- Presented by: the Korean Empire
- Eligibility: Military or civil officials, Korean and foreign, with rank/status determining which grade one received
- Status: Obsolete
- Established: April 17, 1897 (in Korea)

Precedence
- Next (higher): Order of the Plum Blossom
- Next (lower): Order of the Palgwae

Order of the Taegeuk was an order of chivalry of the Korean Empire that was given to military or civil officials. It was divided into eight classes. It was part of the establishments of orders on 17 April 1897. From 22 April 1897, order of the taegeuk started to be awarded.

== Classes ==
Following were the classes and who were the recipients of it:

- 1st Class: Ministers who already got 2nd Class and worked well for 5 or more years after getting 2nd Class. After getting 1st class, officials are able to receive Order of the Plum Blossom.
- 2nd Class: Officials who already got 3rd Class and worked well for 4 or more years after getting 3rd Class.
- 3rd Class: Officials who already got 4th Class and worked well for 4 or more years after getting 4th Class.
- 4th Class: Officials who already got 5th Class and worked well for 4 or more years after getting 5th Class.
- 5th Class: Officials who already got 6th Class and worked well for 4 or more years after getting 6th Class.
- 6th Class: Officials who already got 7th Class and worked well for 3 or more years after getting 7th Class.
- 7th Class: Officials who already got 8th Class and worked well for 3 or more years after getting 8th Class.
- 8th Class: Officials who worked well for 3 or more years.

Foreigners were able to get these orders but recipients and classes were decided by the government.

Following were how the medals were worn:

1st Class of the order is either Badge (with Daesu) or Medal. Daesu was worn from the right shoulder to the left flank and medal was worn in left breast.

2nd Class of the order is either Badge (with Daesu) or Necklet. Daesu was worn from the right shoulder to the left flank and necklet was worn on neck.

3rd Class was necklet and worn on neck.

4th to 8th class were decorations and was worn in left breast.

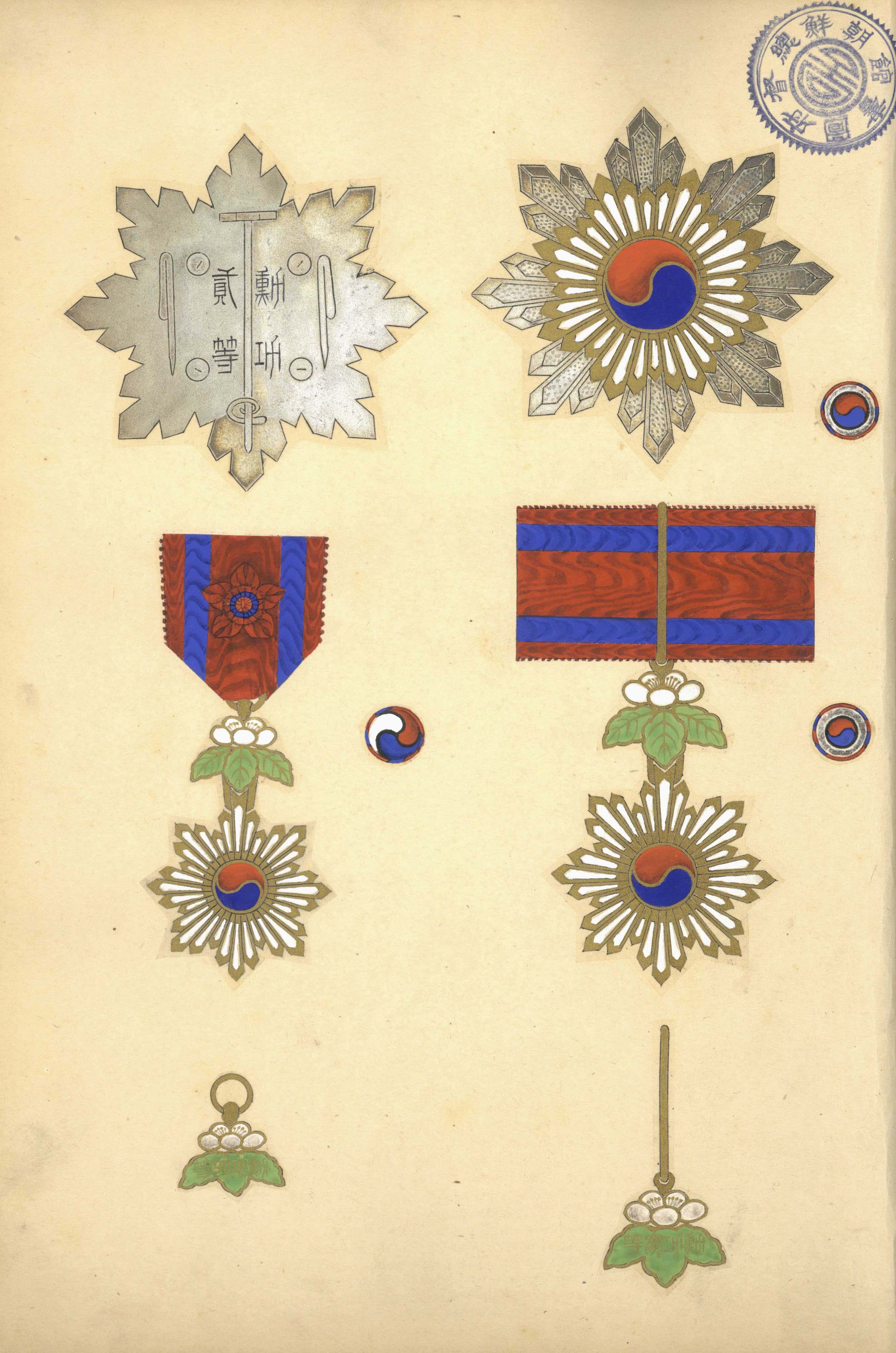
Top: 2nd Class
Bottom right: 3rd Class
Bottom left: 4th Class

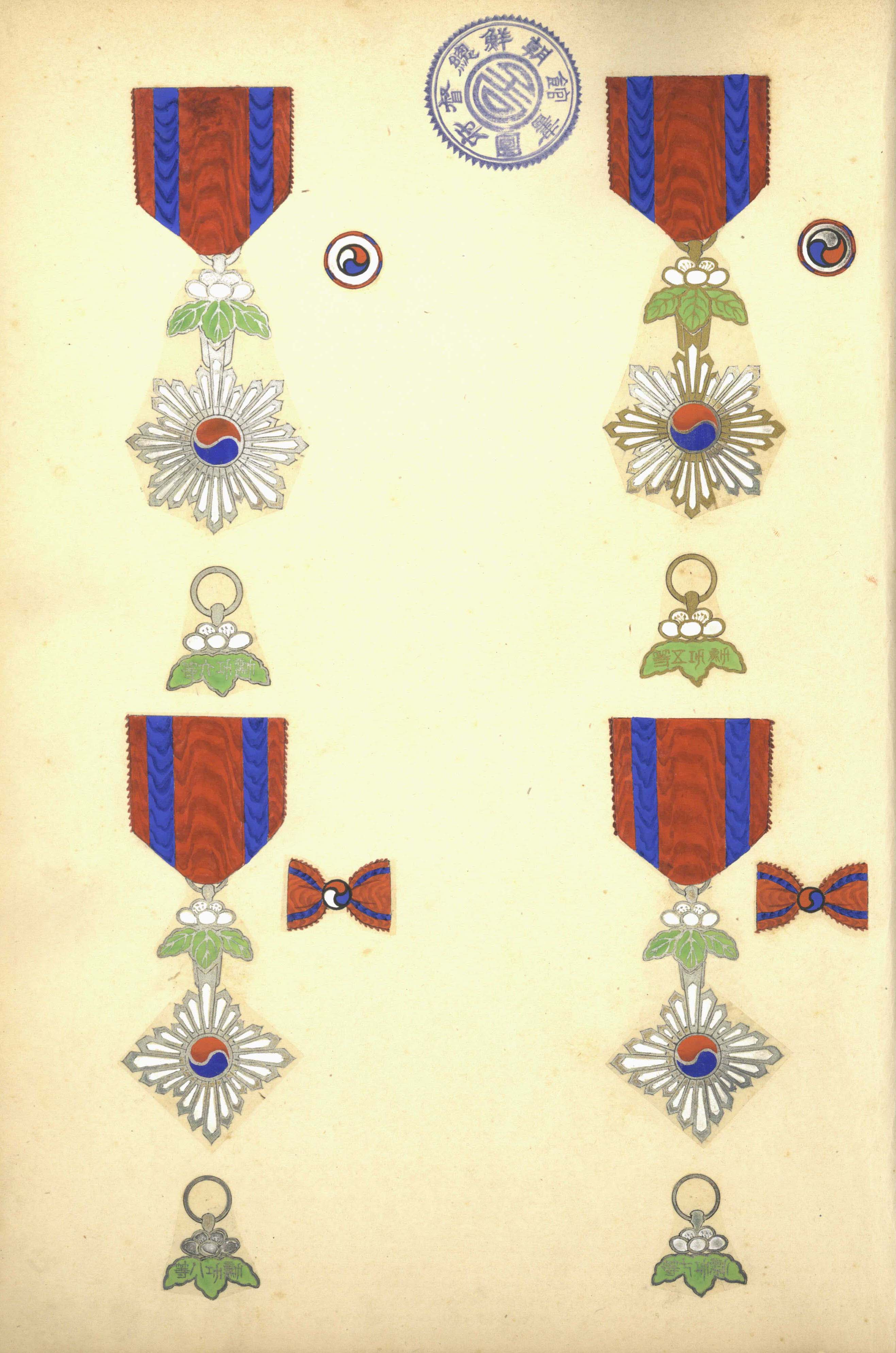
Top right: 5th Class
Top left: 6th Class
Bottom right: 7th Class
Bottom left: 8th Class

== Form ==
In the middle of the medal, there was a taegeuk, symbol of the Korean Empire, in the middle. The size of the medal varied by classes. Higher classes were bigger. Perimeter of 4th class to 6th class was about 5 cm. Perimeter of 7th to 8th class was about 3 cm. 3rd class to 5th class were made of gold and 6th classes to 8th classes were made of silver.

== Trivial ==
1st class of Order of the Taegeuk that was presented to Horace Newton Allen became historical property of Korea.

== Notable Recipients ==
=== 1st Class ===
- Min Young-hwan on 22 April 1900
- Shim Soon-taek on 4 January 1901

=== 2nd Class ===
- Yi Ha-young on 22 April 1900
- Gwon Jae-Hyeong on 22 April 1900
- Min Ung-shik on 22 February 1901
- Shim Sang-hun on 22 February 1901
- Yi Bum-jin on 22 February 1901
- Min Young-chan on 22 February 1901
- Bak Jeongyang on 22 February 1901
- Victor Collin de Plancy on 21 February 1902
- Min Sang-ho on 23 September 1904

=== 3rd Class ===
- Jo Byeong-shik on 22 April 1900
- Pak Chesoon on 22 April 1900
- Yi Yun-yong on 22 April 1900
- Min Sang-ho on 22 February 1901
- Yi Jae-wan on 22 February 1901
