= Yi Bum-jin =

Korean official and diplomat (1852–1911)

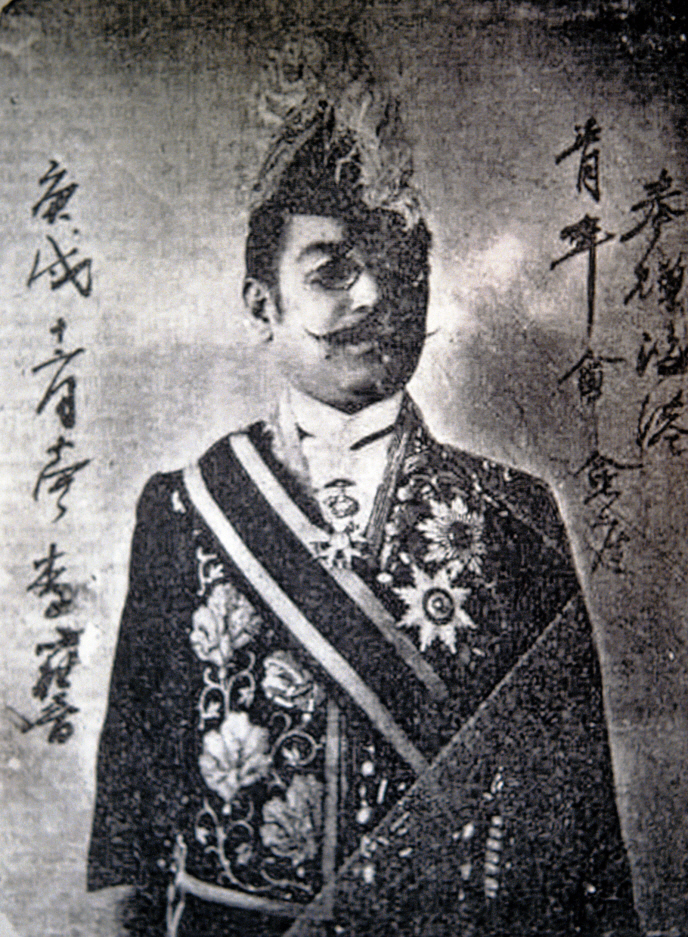

Minister of Law
- Monarch: Gojong
- Preceded by: Cho Byeong-jik
- Succeeded by: Han Kyu-seol

Personal details
- Born: 3 September 1852 (Lunar Calendar) Seoul, Joseon Dynasty
- Died: 13 January 1911 (aged 58) Saint Petersburg, Russian Empire
- Profession: Official, diplomat

Yi Bum-jin (Korean: 이범진; Hanja: 李範晉; 3 September 1852 – 13 January 1911) was a Korean diplomat, official, and politician during the reign of Gojong. He committed suicide after Korea was annexed by Japan in 1911.

== Biography ==
Yi was born in 1852 as the son of Yi Gyeung-ha, a prominent politician during the regency of Heungseon Daewongun. Yi's mother was a concubine; his family line goes back to Grand Prince Gwang-pyeong, who was 5th son of Sejong the Great. Yi's family was one of the yangban families that became military-based as the literary civil service exam (gwageo) became harder to pass.

In 1879, Yi Bum-jin passed the literary examination. Despite his low status as an illegitimate son, he climbed ranks in the government relatively quickly. After being appointed as Sixth Rank in July 1880, Yi was appointed as Tongryewonjuatongrye (Third Rank) in August 1881. This was much faster than Kim Ga-jin, who was also an illegitimate son and entered the officialdom at a similar time with Yi. This fast rise was based on Yi's family, which gave him a connection to the Yeoheung Min clan. After the Imo Incident, Yi developed anti-Qing sentiments; his father was punished by the Qing intervention after the incident. Furthermore, Yi personally had conflicts with Chinese people in Korea, which deepened his resentment.

Yi joined in the Pro-Russian party when Queen Min (later "Empress Myeongseong") initiated a pro-Russian policy to check Japanese influence. He was appointed as the Vice Minister of Agriculture and Industry but resigned after the Queen's assassination. In November 1895, he participated in the Chunsang Gate Incident, but as the conspiracy failed, was exiled to Russia.

Two years later, he returned to Korea, and led Gojong's internal exile to the Russian legation with other pro-Russian politicians. After the exile, Yi joined the pro-Russian cabinet as Minister of Law on 22 February 1896. In June 1896, Yi was appointed as the Envoy to America. Upon his arrival, he met the president Grover Cleveland and announced the replacement of Korean envoy on 11 September. While in America, Yi wrote a diary, which later became known as the Misi Diary.

As a Korean ambassador in Russia, Yi endeavored to preserve the autonomy and rights of the Korean Empire. When Russian envoy to Korea Nikolai G. Matiunine attempted to prolong logging rights, Yi showed his opposition to the contract. Furthermore, when Russian forces seized Yong-am Po, Yi opposed the seizure to protect Korean sovereignty. Upon the Japanese occupation of Korea by military force, Yi was ordered to return to Korea. However, he disobeyed the order of Minister of Foreign Affairs, and maintained his position as a minister to Russia until the end of Russo-Japanese War. He rather obeyed the order of the Emperor, which decreed him to ignore Japanese pressure to return to Korea and stay at Russia. The Russian government gave Yi 7,325 Ruble every three months as a message of opposing Japanese tyranny in Korea. This financial aid was given from February 1904 to December 1905. Although as an unofficial envoy, Yi served the emperor by delivering his diplomatic letters to Nicholas II. However, as the Japan-Korea Treaty of 1905 was signed, his authority as a Korean minister in Russia forfeited, thus starting a grey-wave political refuge. While in Russia, he received Order of Saint Alexander Nevsky 1st Class. After noticing that Korea is a participant of the convention, Yi assisted Korean delegates to the Hague Conventions of 1907. He exhorted for the support of the Russian government; however, the Russian government refused to help the Koreans as Japan–Russia Secret Agreements were being signed. Even though his efforts to receive Russian support failed, Yi wholeheartedly supported these delegates by writing their declaration in French.

After the failure of the Hague Secret Emissary Affair, Yi shifted his attention to the Korean society in Primorsky Krai. Yi attempted to foster anti-Japanese sentiment by supporting the establishments of Korean presses; he also sponsored and organized Korean righteous armies. By 1908, the righteous armies in the region estimated about 3,000 to 4,000 men. When Choi Jae-hyeon and Yi Bum-yun were organizing the Dongin hui, Yi sent his son Yi Ouitjyong and 10,000 rubles as funds. Ouitjyong's father-in-law Karl Joseph Stainslaw Freiherr von Nolcken, who was a Russian governor of Tomsk, accompanied him, encouraging even greater resistance of the Korean society in Russia.

Despite his dogged effort, the bleak destiny of Korea remained unchanged. As Korea was annexed by Japanese, Yi felt great agony for that fact and committed suicide. After his death, Yi bequeathed his legacy to the Korean society in Vladivostok and San Francisco. Recognizing short term resistance would become vain, Yi underscored beneficiaries to use his legacy for educating the younger generation.

Posthumously, Yi received Presidential Commendation in 1963 and Order of Merit for National Foundation in 1991.

== Family ==
Yi had two sons, Yi Gi-jong and Yi Ouitjyong. Both of his sons were officials of the Korean Empire and resisted against the Japanese rule of Korea. His first son, Yi Gi-jong returned to Korea in 1902 and started to serve as an official of Korean Empire as Artillery Department Leader of the Ministry of Military and Beop Mu Guk Jang of the Ministry of Law. After the Japanese victory of the Russo-Japanese War became evident, Yi Gi-jong resigned his office. He was under the surveillance of Japanese because of the dogged resistance of his father and younger brother. After Ito Hirobumi was shot in 1909, he was arrested.

== Honours ==
Korean Empire

- Order of the Taegeuk 2nd class on 22 February 1901

Russian Empire

- Order of Saint Alexander Nevsky 1st Class
