= Order of the Palgwae =

Order of the Palgwae 팔괘장 八卦章
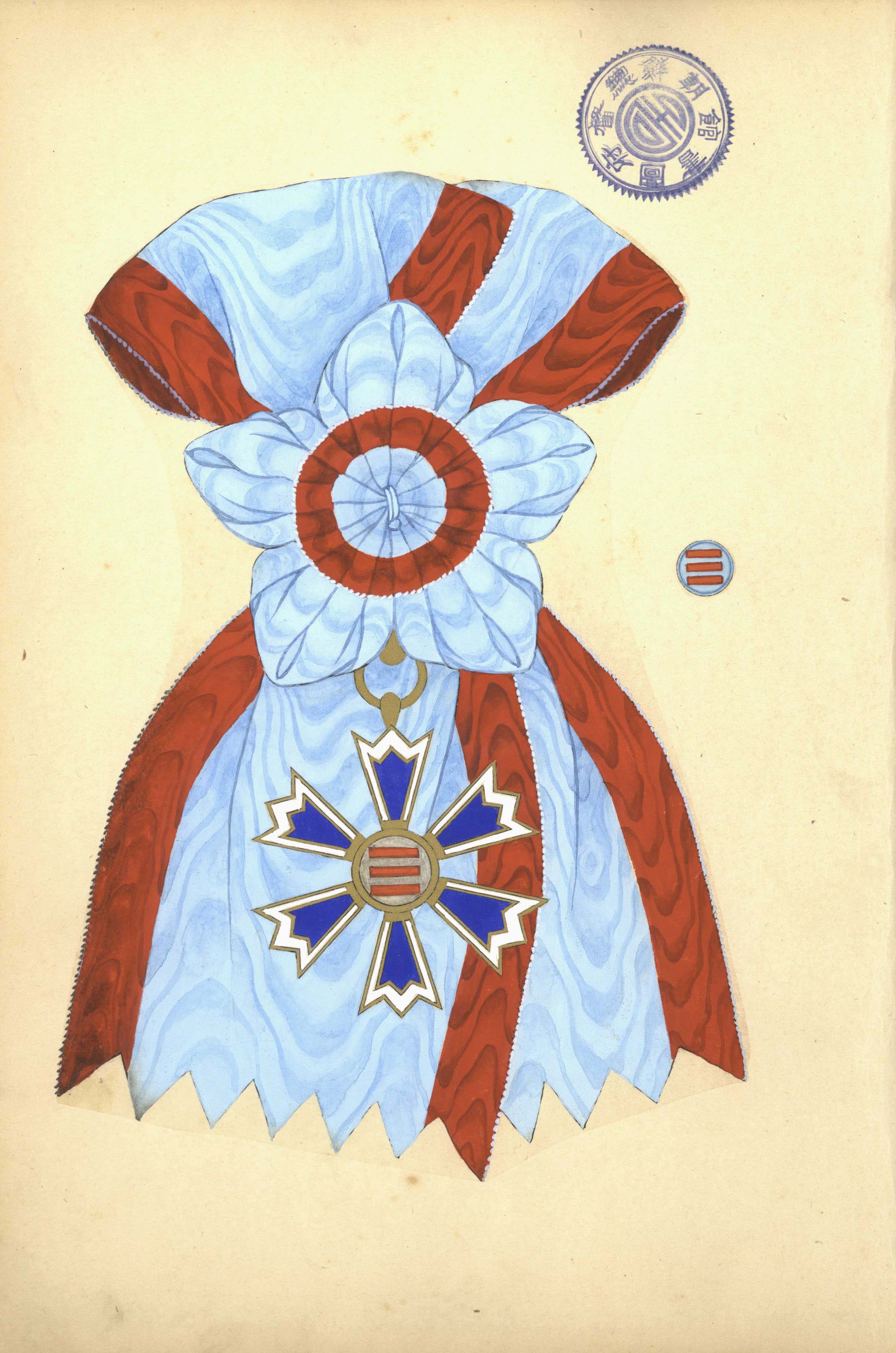
- 1st Class of the order
- Type: Dynastic order
- Awarded for: Merit
- Presented by: the Korean Empire
- Eligibility: Military or civil officials, Korean and foreign, with rank/status determining which grade one received
- Status: Obsolete
- Established: April, 1898 (in Korea)

Precedence
- Next (higher): Order of the Taegeuk
- Next (lower): Order of the Purple Hawk

The Order of the Palgwae was an order of chivalry of the Korean Empire that was given to military personnel and officials. Established on 16 April 1898, the order was divided into eight classes.

== Form ==
The Order of the Palgwae had the trigram in the middle. For the 1st class, it had daesu, with a width of about 11.4 cm. For the 2nd class, it had a medal with the daesu, with the medal's perimeter about 9 cm. The perimeter for the 3rd class was about 5.4cm. The 3rd and 4th classes were the same but the shapes of the rings were different. The 5th class was the same as the 4th, but the perimeter was 4.5cm. The 6th to 8th class was the same as the 5th but they were made of silver.

Like Order of the Taegeuk, the 1st Class of the order was either a badge (with Daesu) or a medal. Daesu was worn from the right shoulder to the left flank and the medal was worn on the left breast. The 2nd Class of the order was either a badge (with Daesu) or a necklet, and Daesu was worn from the right shoulder to the left flank and the necklet on the neck. The 3rd Class was a necklet. Lastly, the 4th to 8th class were decorations and was worn on the left breast.

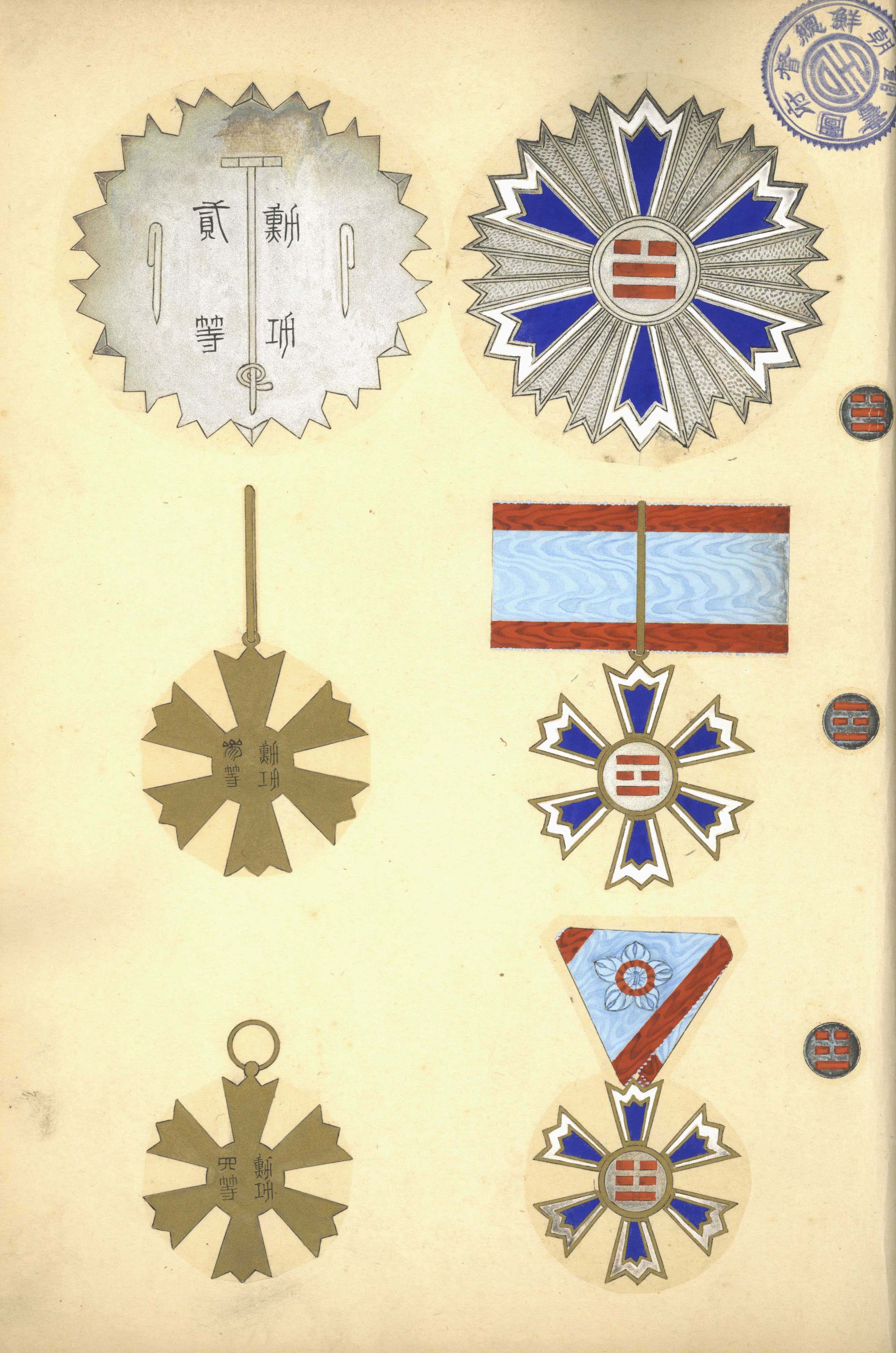
Top: 2nd Class
Middle: 3rd Class
Bottom: 4th Class

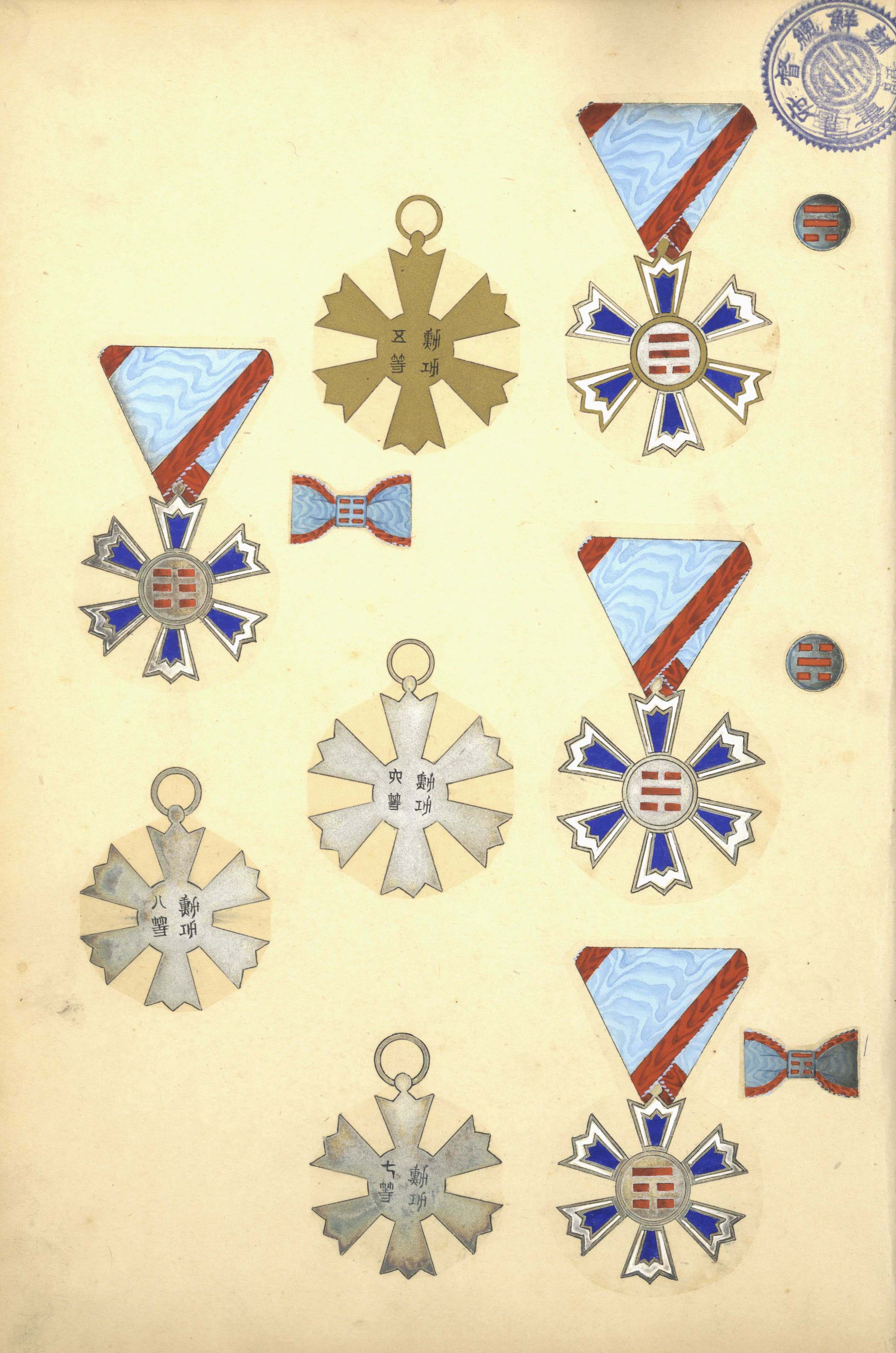
Top right: 5th Class
Middle right: 6th Class
Bottom right: 7th Class
Left: 8th Class

== Notable recipients ==
=== 1st Class ===
- Kototada Fujinami on 24 September 1904
- Gwon Jung-Hyeon on 25 October 1904
- Toyosaburo Ochiai on 18 January 1905
- Yi Geun-taek on 21 May 1905

=== 2nd Class ===
- Yi Yong-ik on 14 November 1902
- Yi Geun-taek on 22 February 1905

=== 3rd Class ===
- Yi Byeong-mu on 15 January 1906
- Kim Yung-Han on 30 October 1907
- Yun Chi-sung on 28 October 1909
