= Yun Ungnyŏl =

Korean general (1840–1911)

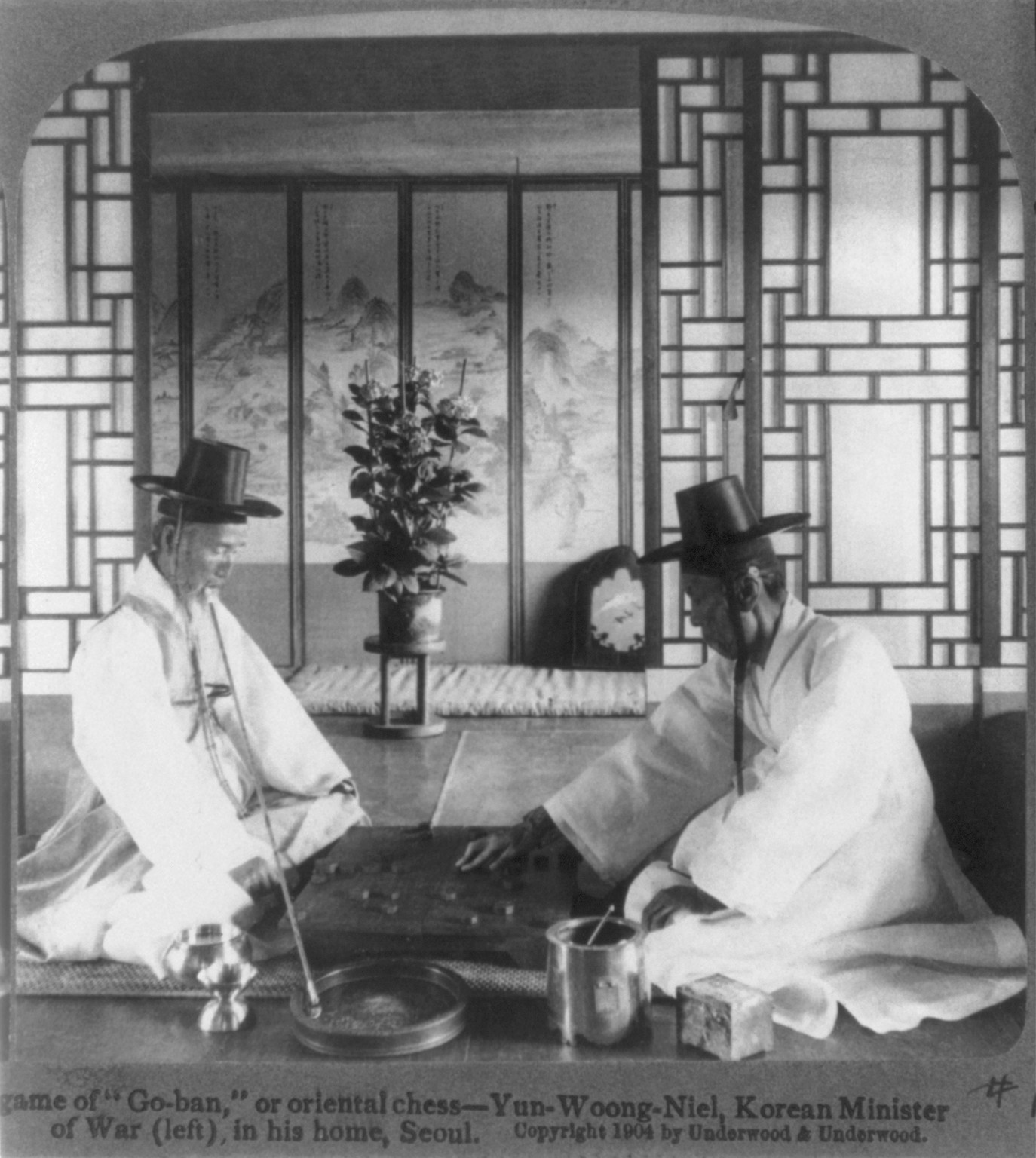
- Yun Ungnyŏl (left) and a friend attired in traditional Korean clothing. The two are engaged in a game of "Go-ban" (oriental chess) in one of the rooms of Yun's home in Seoul c. 1903.

Korean name
- Hangul: 윤웅렬
- Hanja: 尹雄烈
- RR: Yun Ungryeol
- MR: Yun Ungnyŏl

Art name
- Hangul: 반계
- Hanja: 磻溪
- RR: Bangye
- MR: Pan'gye

Courtesy name
- Hangul: 영중
- Hanja: 英仲
- RR: Yeongjung
- MR: Yŏngjung

Yun Ungnyŏl (Korean: 윤웅렬; Hanja: 尹雄烈; 18 May 1840 (Note: In the Korean calendar (lunisolar), Yun was born on 17 April 1840) – 22 September 1911) was a Korean general and politician during the Joseon and Korean Empire periods. He was a member of the Enlightenment Party and a pro-Japanese scholar-official. He is also known as Yun Woong Niel or Yun Ung-nyeol. His art name was Pan'gye (반계; 磻溪).

== Biography ==
Yun Ungnyŏl was a member of one of the prominent yangban families of Korea, the Haepyeong Yun clan. His family was considered wealthy, which his father had paved the way to prominence by himself. From his early age, Yun and his younger brother were famous for their great physical abilities.

At the age of 17, Yun went to Seoul by himself and took the mugwa (military civil service examination), and passed the exam, making him an official.

From 1881, Yun was in charge of the new army of joseon, also known as the Pyŏlgigun. As a member of the Enlightenment Party, Yun participated in the Kapsin Coup. After the short-lived new government was formed, Yun was appointed as Minister of Justice, and Vice Mayor of Seoul.

In 1904, Yun Ungnyŏl was appointed as the Korea's Minister of War. On 30 September 1904, Yun was appointed as the Chief of Staff of Korean Empire but he resigned on 30 January 1905 making him the last incumbent. He died in 1911, aged 71.

In modern Korean historiography, Yun is considered a Korean collaborator with Imperial Japan.
