= Kungnaebu =

Joseon royal household organization

- Hangul: 궁내부
- Hanja: 宮內府
- RR: Gungnaebu
- MR: Kungnaebu

Kungnaebu (Korean: 궁내부; Hanja: 宮內府; lit. Department of the Royal Household) was a government office of Joseon and the Korean Empire in charge of affairs related to the royal House of Yi. In the government organization during the Joseon Dynasty, the division between the state of affairs and royal affairs was not distinctive. It had several subdivisions such as Jonchinbu, and Uibinbu, Donnyeongbu and others, some of which were independently operated or belonged to Yukjo (Six Ministries of Joseon).

The current Cultural Heritage Administration of the Republic of Korea claims descent from the Kungnaebu.

Jongchinbu preserved the genealogy and portraits of the line of kings, managed costume of the king and queen, and dealt with relatives of the kings. Uibinbu took care of dealing with affairs regarding a son-in-law of the king, while Donnyeongbu managed affairs for cultivating mutual friendship among relatives of the king and queen.

== Organization ==
The Kungnaebu supervised the affairs of the King's family. Under Kungnaebu, there were many subordinating organizations. There was one minister, one vice minister, three Juimgwans, two translators, ten Jusas, and 15 special officials.

== List of ministers ==
1. Prince Imperial Heung (15 July 1894 in Lunar Calendar - 15 May 1895 in Lunar Calendar)
2. Yun Yong-gu (20 May 1895 in Lunar Calendar - 29 June 1895 in Lunar Calendar)
3. Yi Gyung-jik (? -?)
4. Prince Imperial Heung (20 August 1895 in Lunar Calendar - 11 February 1896)
5. Yi Jae-sun (11 February 1896 - ?)
6. Min Young-gyu (1 October 1897 - ?)
7. Yi Jae-sun (11 July 1898 - ?)
8. Yun Yong-gu (11 October 1898 - 19 October 1898)
9. Min Byeong-suk (20 October 1898 - 24 November 1898
10. Min Young-gu (24 November 1898 - ?)
11. Yi Jae-sun (21 December 1898 - ?)
12. Yi Jae-wan (25 June 1899 - ?)
13. Min Young-so (27 December 1902 - ?)
14. Yi Jae-wan (? - ?)
15. Min Byeong-suk
16. Min Young-cheol
17. Yi Jae-guk
18. Yi Geun-sang
19. Yun Yong-gu
20. Shim Sang-hun
21. Yi Jae-guk
22. Park Yung-hyo
23. Yi Yun-yong
24. Min Byeong-suk

== See also ==
- History of Korea
- Yukjo
- Office of the Yi Dynasty
- Jeonju Lee Royal Family Association
