= Gojong's internal exile to the Russian legation =

1896 flight of the Korean monarch

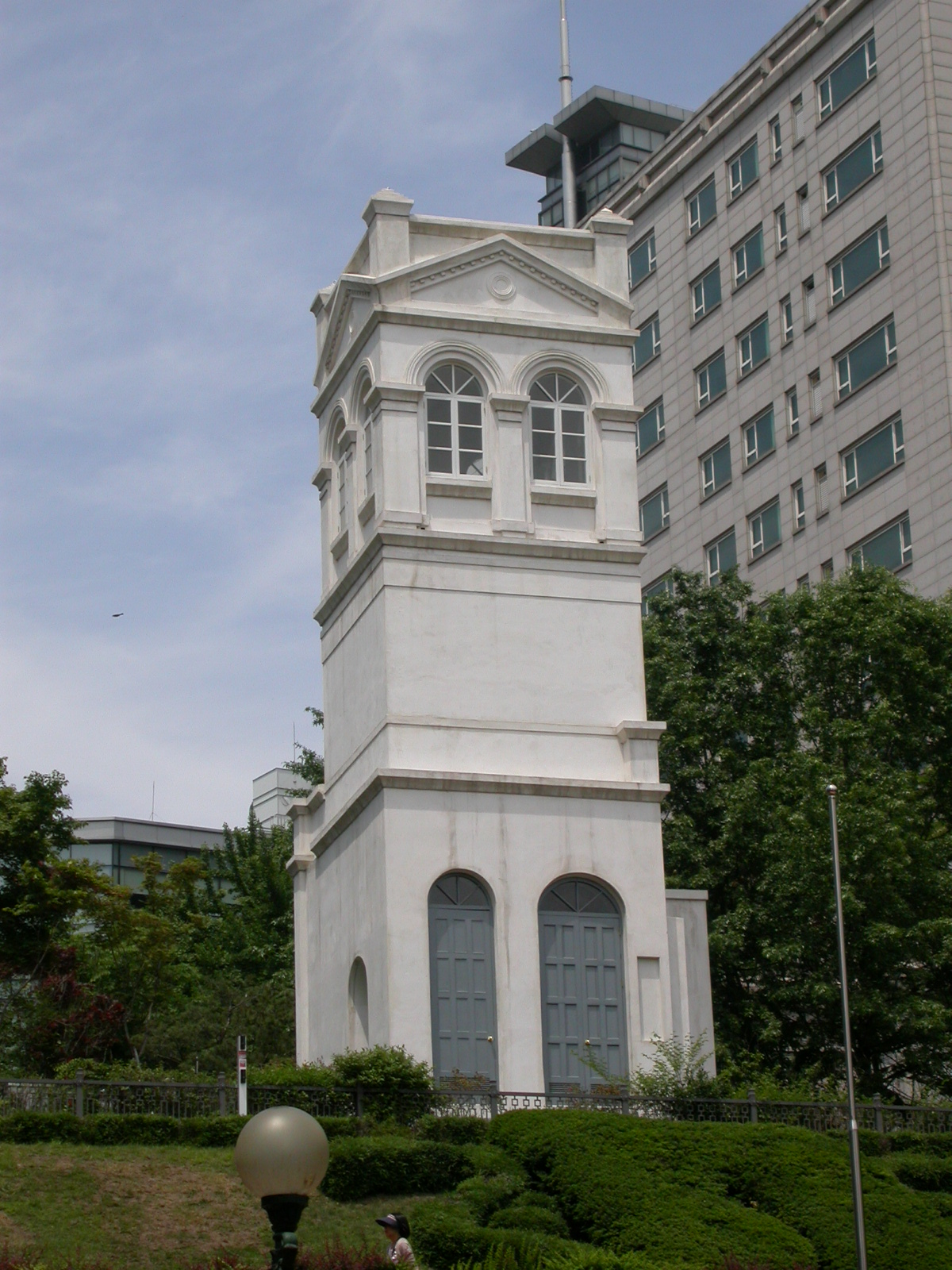
- The part of the old Russian legation building in Seoul

Korean name
- Hangul: 아관파천
- Hanja: 俄館播遷
- RR: Agwan pacheon
- MR: Agwan p'ach'ŏn

King Gojong's internal exile to the Russian legation, also called the Agwan Pacheon incident (Korean: 아관파천), occurred in 1896 in Korea when King Gojong and his crown prince left the Gyeongbokgung palace to take refuge at the Russian legation in Hanseong (Seoul). The incident resulted in a temporary decline of Japan's influence in Korea and corresponding rise in Russia's influence.

== Context ==
The incident occurred after the First Sino-Japanese War during a period of factional confrontation within the Korean royal court. King Gojong of the Joseon dynasty and his crown prince took refuge from the Gyeongbok Palace at the Russian legation in Seoul, from which they controlled the Korean government for about one year from February 11, 1896, to February 20, 1897. Their escape took place in secrecy; it was arranged by the pro-Russian official Yi Bum-jin, the Russian consul Karl Ivanovich Weber, and others.

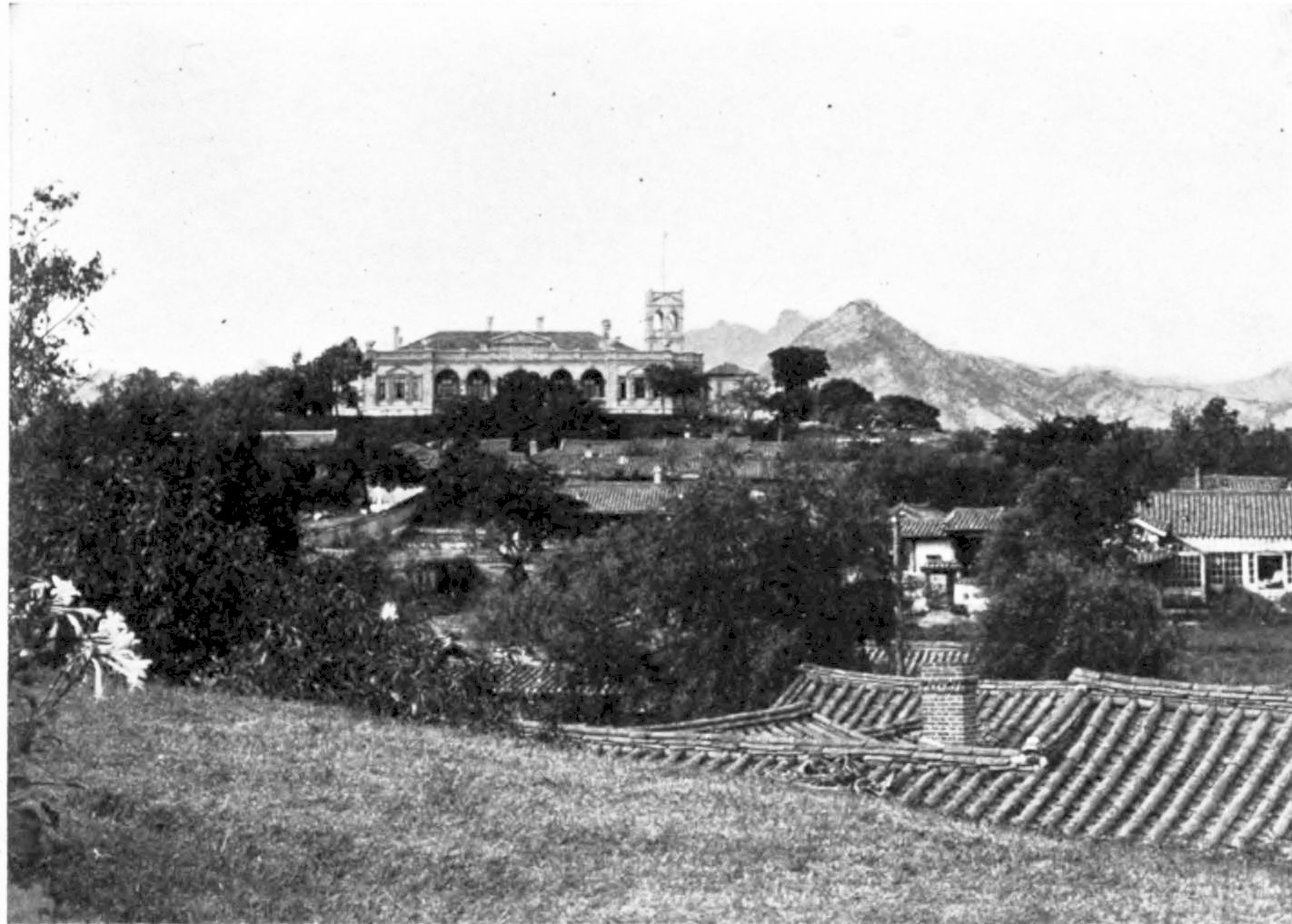
The Russian Legation photographed around 1900. It was placed on a hill and lay next-door to the Gyeongbokgung (Northern) Palace where the king was effectively being held prisoner immediately after his wife's assassination.

The event, which was triggered in part by the king's fear of a coup d'état and his reaction to the murder of his wife Empress Myeongseong by the Japanese, marked a shift in Joseon politics away from the pro-Japanese reform faction and toward to the conservative faction which had been aligned with Queen Min (later given the title Empress Myeongseong). This led to the general repeal of the Gabo Reforms.

Members of the old cabinet were killed or forced to flee, including Kim Hong-jip, Eo Yun-jung, and Yu Gil-jun. Pro-Russian and pro-U.S. figures came to power, with Yi Beom-jin and Lee Wan-yong named to the new cabinet. Trade and resource concessions were granted to Russia, and to a lesser degree to other Western powers including the United States. Japan remained Korea's most important trading partner.

The move and associated concessions were greeted with widespread outrage within Korea, led by the Independence Club. This reaction eventually spurred the king to return to Deoksugung after slightly more than a year at the Russian embassy. Russian guards continued to guard the king upon his return to the palace. This may have contributed to the declaration of the Korean Empire later in 1897, affirming Korea's independence. Ironically, this increase in Russian influence led to the end of Korean independence. After the Russo-Japanese War, Japan, determined to secure more control, signed a coercive treaty in 1905 that made Korea a protectorate. Five years later, Japan annexed Korea, marking the start of Japanese mainland colonialism.

== See also ==
- Russia–South Korea relations
