= Board of Marshals =

1897–1904 military agency of the Korean Empire

- Korean: 원수부; Hanja: 元帥府
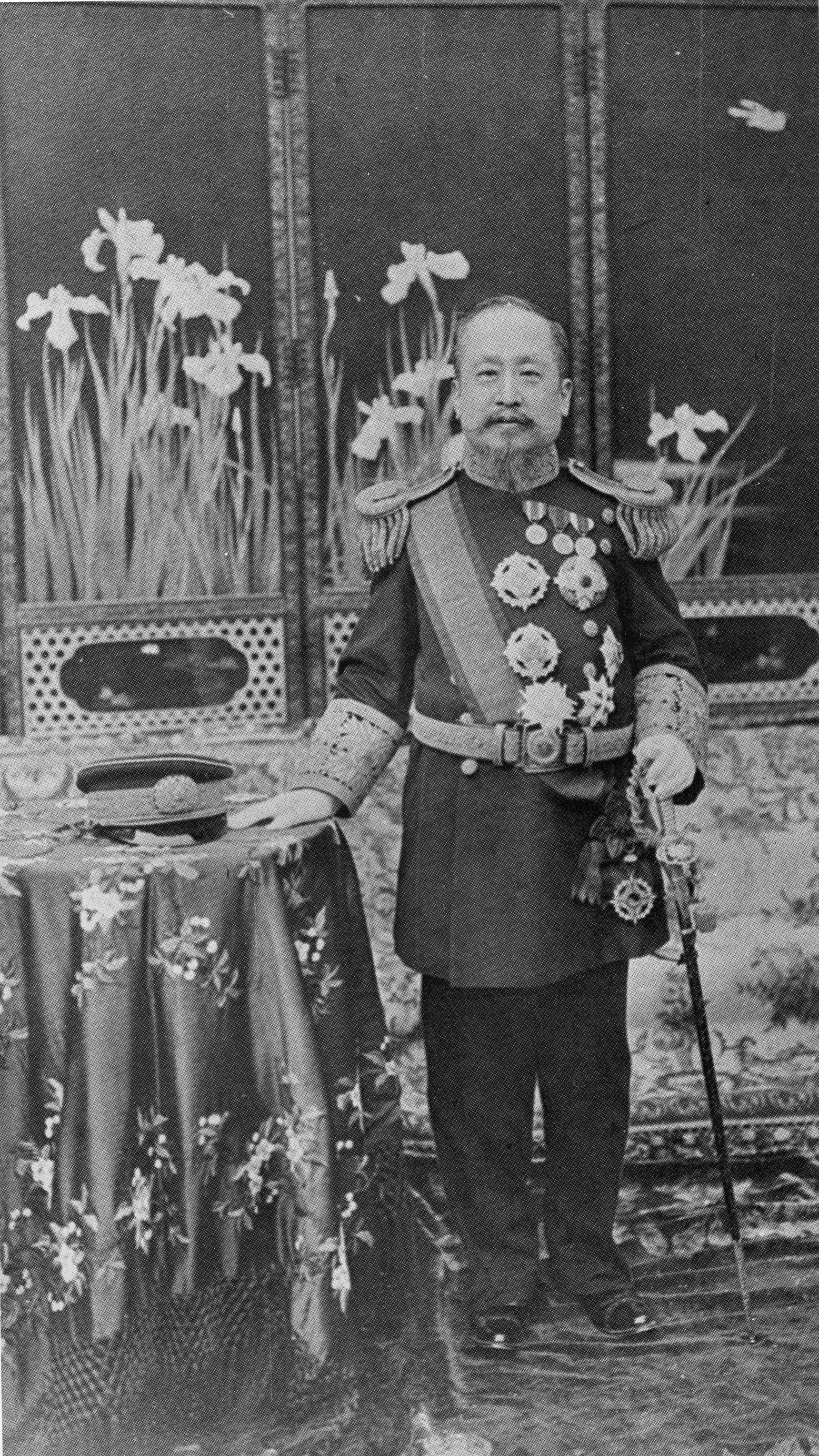
- Emperor Gojong, head of the Board of Marshals

Agency overview
- Formed: February 1897
- Dissolved: September 1904
- Jurisdiction: Korean Empire
- Headquarters: Seoul

The Board of Marshals (Korean: 원수부; Hanja: 元帥府) was the ministry which managed overall the military of the Korean Empire. This was for centralizing power towards the then-emperor, Gojong of the Korean Empire. Gojong established it to have the supreme command of the army. After the establishment of the board, the power of the military authorities was handed to the Emperor. Two regiments of both the Imperial Guards and the City Guards were organized to guard the capital city, Seoul. The Board then commissioned Military Police, Military Engineers, and a Military Band. The total number of the modernized army grew to a significant number of 28,000 just before the Russo-Japanese War. After the Japanese won, the Japanese disbanded the ministry to reduce and later remove all military power from the Emperor.

== Organization ==
The Board of Marshals was consists of four organizations. Followings are the organizations and their roles:

1. Military Affairs Section: Responsible for preparing battles
2. Prosecuting Section: Responsible for punishing the personnels
3. Recording Section: Responsible for recording
4. Accounting Section: Responsible for managing budget
