= March First Movement =

1919 anti-colonial protests in Korea

- Part of the Korean independence movement
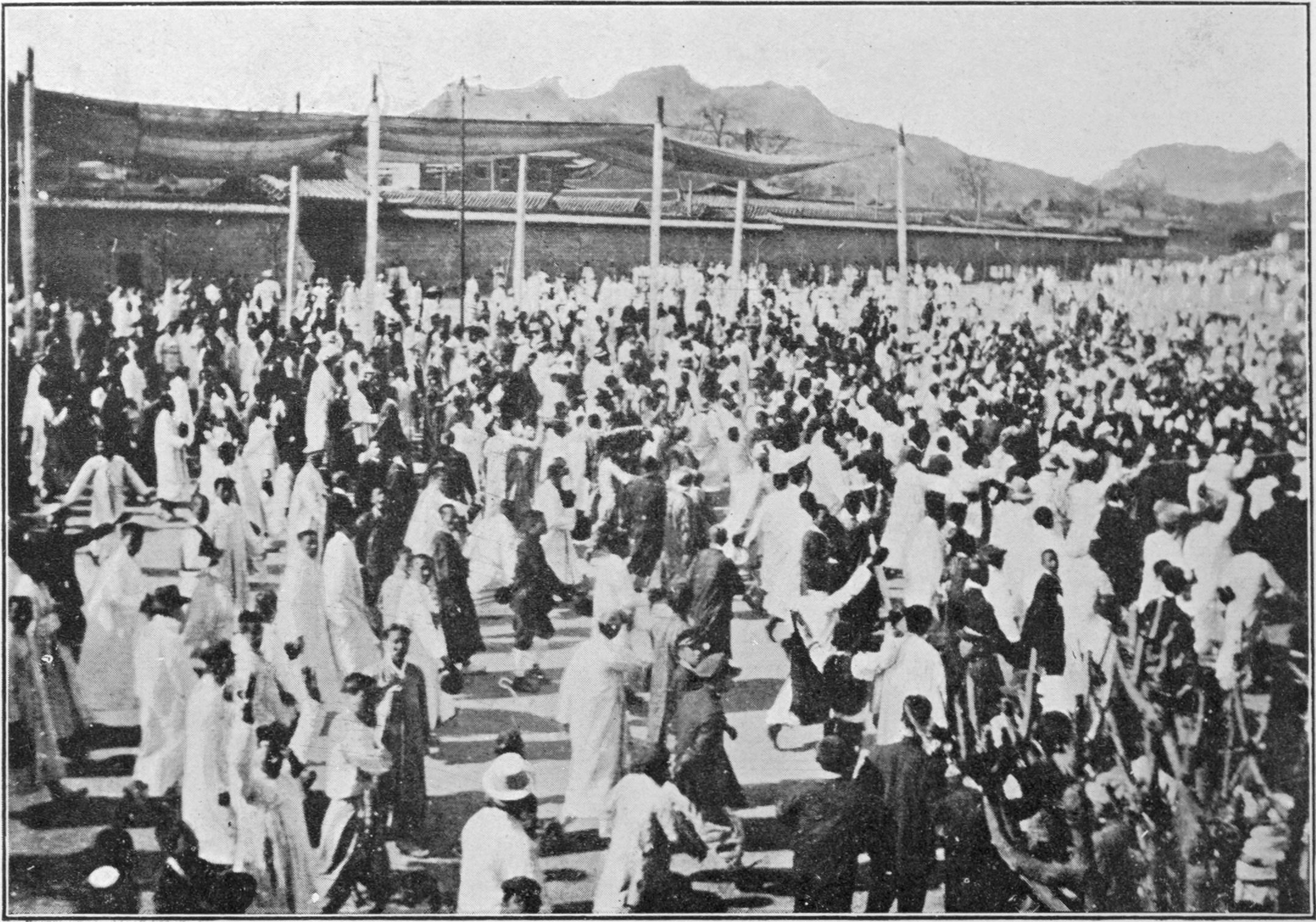
- A march during one of the protests in Seoul (1919)
- Date: March 1 – April 1919, related protests until 1921
- Location: Korea under Japanese rule; China; Russian Empire; United States; Mexico; Japan
- Caused by: Ideals of self-determination, discontent with colonial rule, and theories that former Emperor Gojong had been poisoned by Japan
- Goals: Secure Korea's independence; Gain international support
- Methods: Nonviolent resistance
- Result: Violent suppression; No official support from foreign governments; Damaged Japan's international image; Invigorated independence activism; Creation of the Korean Provisional Government in exile; Inspiration for other protest movements abroad
- Concessions: Colonial government granted limited cultural freedoms as part of its cultural rule policies

Parties
Korean independence activists	Government-General of Chōsen

Number
Around 0.8 to 2 million	

Casualties
- Deaths: Around 798 to 7,509
- Arrested: 46,948 (1920 Korean estimate)

The March First Movement (Note: North Korean name: 삼일인민봉기; 三一人民蜂起; lit. 'March First People's Rebellion'; South Korean name: 3·1 운동; lit. 'March First Movement'. The South Korean name is sometimes transliterated as the Sam-il Movement (lit. 'three-one movement'). Alternate names Manse Movement (만세운동; 萬歲運動; lit. 'Ten-thousand Year Movement'), Gimi Independence Movement (기미독립운동; 己未獨立運動; named for the year the movement occurred in the sexagenary cycle), and March First Revolution (3.1 혁명; 三一革命).) was a series of protests against Japanese colonial rule that was held throughout Korea and internationally by the Korean diaspora beginning on March 1, 1919. Protests were largely concentrated in March and April of that year, although related protests continued until 1921. In South Korea, the movement is remembered as a landmark event of not only the Korean independence movement, but of all of Korean history.

The protests began in Seoul, with public readings of the Korean Declaration of Independence in the restaurant T'aehwagwan and in Tapgol Park. The movement grew and spread rapidly. Statistics on the protest are uncertain; there were around 1,500 to 1,800 protests with a total of around 0.8 to 2 million participants. The total population of Korea at the time was around 16 to 17 million.

Despite the largely peaceful nature of the protests, they were frequently violently suppressed. One Korean estimate in 1920 claimed 7,509 deaths and 46,948 arrests. Japanese authorities reported much lower numbers, although there were instances where authorities were observed destroying evidence, such as during the Jeamni massacre.

Japanese authorities then conducted a global disinformation campaign on the protests. They promoted a wide range of narratives, including outright denial of any protests occurring, portraying them as violent Bolshevik uprisings, and claiming that Koreans were in need of the benevolent rule of Japan. These narratives were publicly challenged by sympathetic foreigners and by the Korean diaspora.

The movement did not result in Korea's prompt liberation, but had a number of significant effects. It invigorated the Korean independence movement and resulted in the creation of the Korean Provisional Government. It also caused some damage to Japan's international reputation and caused the Japanese colonial government to grant some limited cultural freedoms to Koreans under a series of policies that have since been dubbed "cultural rule". Furthermore, the movement went on to inspire other movements abroad, including the Chinese May Fourth Movement and Indian satyagraha protests.

The anniversary of the movement's start has been celebrated since, although this was largely done in secret in Korea until its liberation in 1945. In South Korea, it is a national holiday. The North Korean government initially celebrated it as a national holiday, but eventually demoted it and now does not evaluate the movement's significance similarly. It now promotes writings about the event that seek to emphasize the role of the ruling Kim family in the protests.

== Background ==
In 1910, Japan formally annexed Korea. Japanese rule was initially especially tight. Japan took control over Korea's economy, and began a process of Japanization: forced cultural assimilation. Land was confiscated from Koreans and given to Japanese people, and economic and administrative systems were created that were systemically discriminatory. Resistance was violently suppressed, and freedom of speech and press were tightly controlled.

Japanese colonial policies mandated that Koreans send increasingly significant portions of their economic output to Japan, for what was seen as inadequate compensation. This caused a significant decline in the quality of life for many farmers and laborers, who began publicly protesting their treatment. In 1916, there were 6 strikes with 362 participants. In 1917, there were 8 strikes with 1,128, and by 1918 there were 50 strikes with 4,442. Historians of the National Institute of Korean History argue that this reflected increasing discontent in Korea around the time of the movement.

=== Fourteen Points and philosophical developments ===
Japan had been successfully rapidly industrializing since the late 19th century. Around this time, Western theories surrounding social Darwinism and colonial civilizing missions gained significant traction in Japan. These theories were often used to justify and promote Japanese colonialism. The devastation during the 1914–1918 First World War was a shock to many, and motivated intellectuals in Korea and around the world to discuss liberal reforms, especially anti-colonialism, and ideals that would serve to discourage future such conflicts.

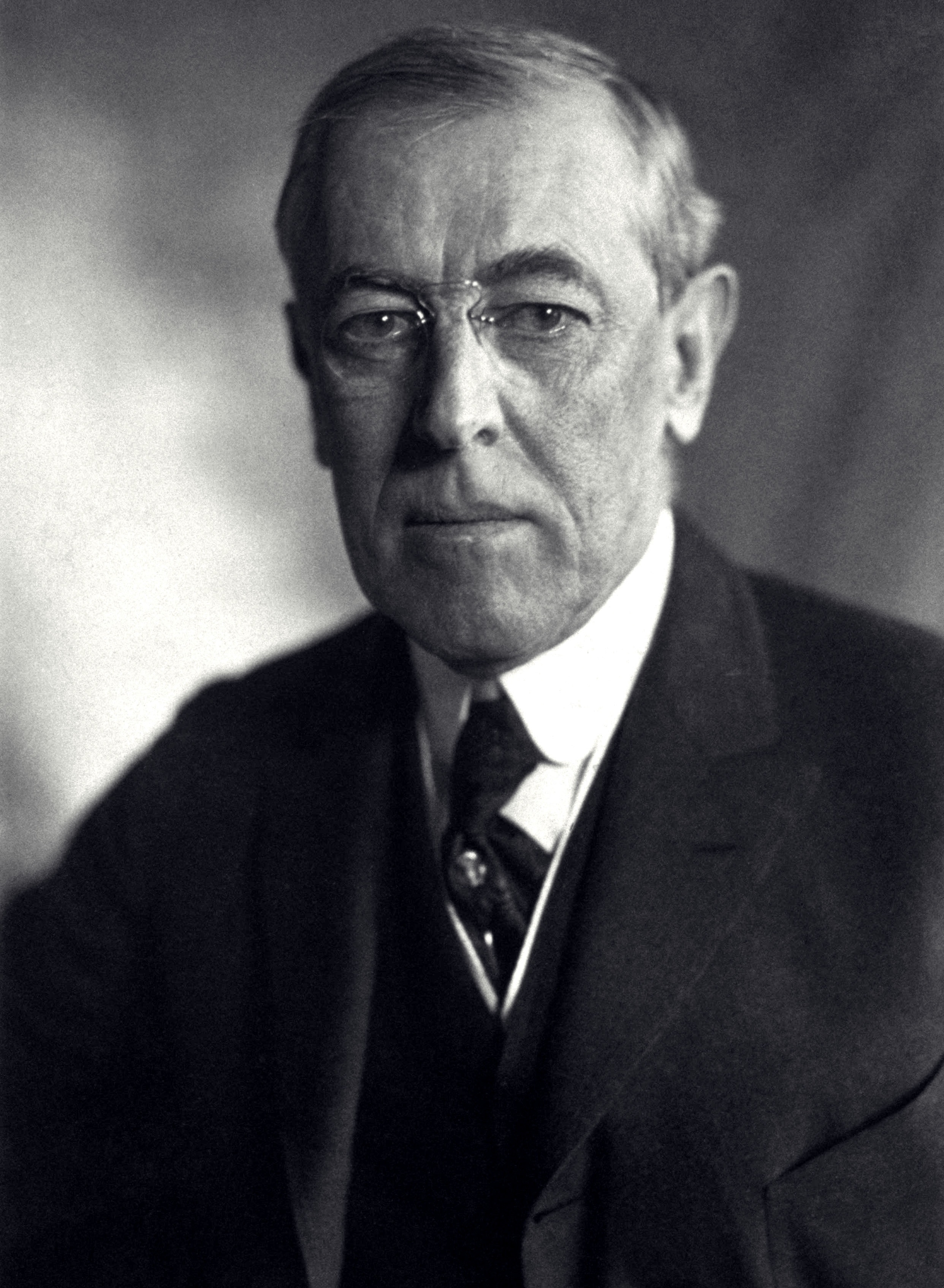
U.S. President Woodrow Wilson (1919)

After the end of the war in 1918, United States President Woodrow Wilson announced his vision for establishing peace and the new world order. This vision was dubbed the Fourteen Points, and included the right of national self-determination. Koreans who learned of Wilson's vision were inspired, and interpreted it as signaling support for their independence movement. Their sympathy to the U.S. and the Allies reportedly greatly increased.

The sincerity behind Wilson's advocacy for self-determination is debated. Some scholars argue his advocacy was limited to the former colonies of the defeated Central Powers, which Japan was not a part of. Historian Ku Daeyeol argues Wilson's efforts were sincere, but frustrated by geopolitical realities. The U.S. would not begin openly advocating for Korean independence until decades later, after it joined World War II against Japan. The Japanese colonial government suppressed discussion of the Fourteen Points; for example, around this time it reportedly banned a foreign film from being screened in Korea because the film had images of President Wilson.

=== Paris Peace Conference and the death of Gojong ===
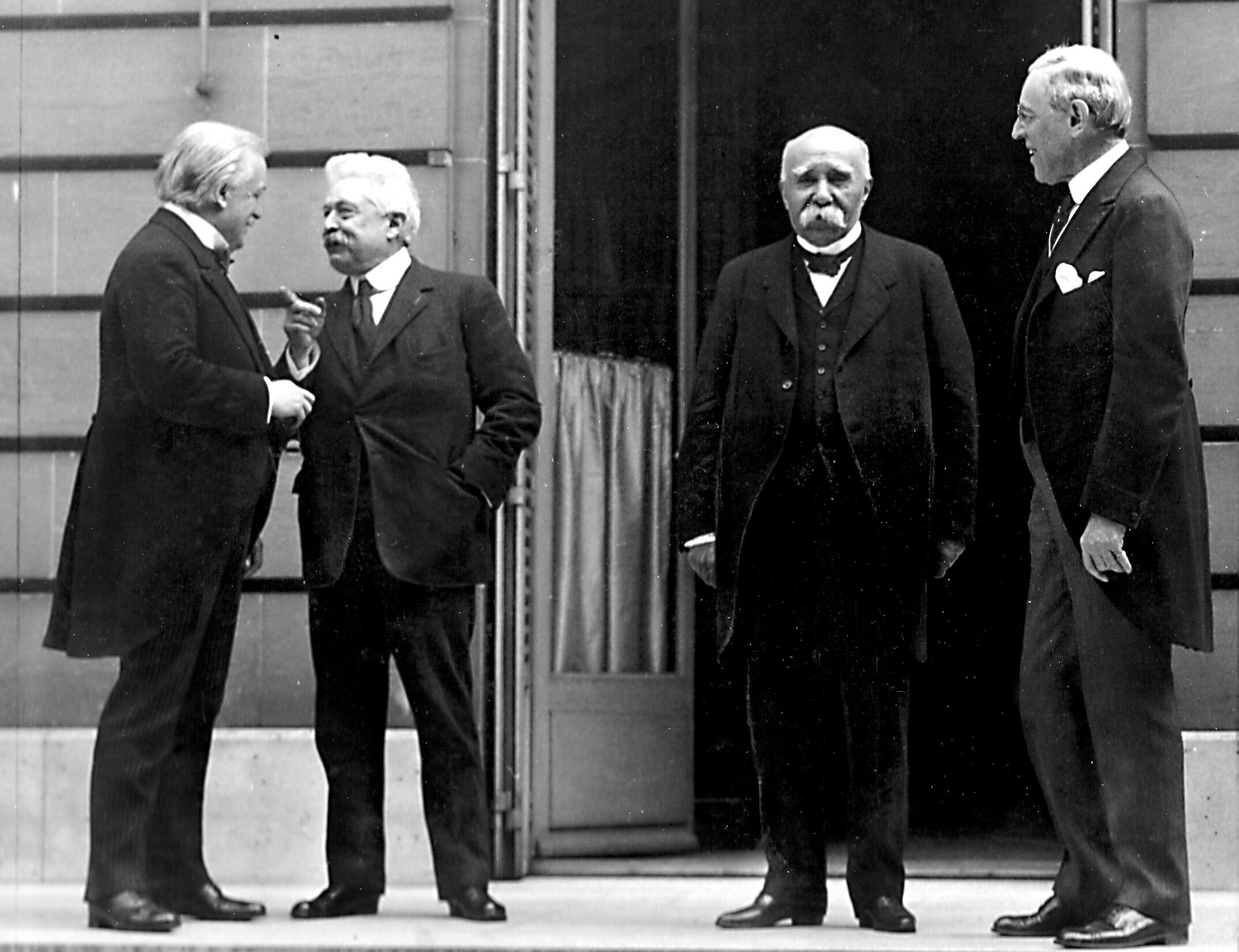
Western leaders at the Paris Peace Conference (May 27, 1919)

After the conclusion of the war, various nations participated in the 1919–1920 Paris Peace Conference, during which the sovereignty of a number of nations was discussed.

Koreans made a number of unsuccessful attempts to be represented at the conference. The Korean-American Korean National Association attempted to send Syngman Rhee and Henry Chung to the conference, but the U.S. government denied them permission to go. A group of Koreans in China, the New Korean Youth Party, managed to send Kim Kyu-sik with the Chinese delegation. Chinese leaders, hoping to embarrass Japan, attempted to put a discussion of Korea's sovereignty on the agenda, but did not succeed.

Koreans in China also created a plan to secretly extract former Korean emperor Gojong from his house arrest in Korea, and eventually bring him to the conference. Before that could happen, on January 21, 1919, Gojong suddenly died. Japan reported that Gojong had died from natural causes, but he had reportedly been healthy just until his death. Koreans widely suspected that Japan had poisoned him; these theories were in part motivated by knowledge of previous attempts on Gojong's life.

Public outrage at the possibility that Gojong had been murdered has since been evaluated as having a critical impact on the timing of, and even the altogether occurrence of, the March First Movement.

=== February 8 Declaration of Independence ===
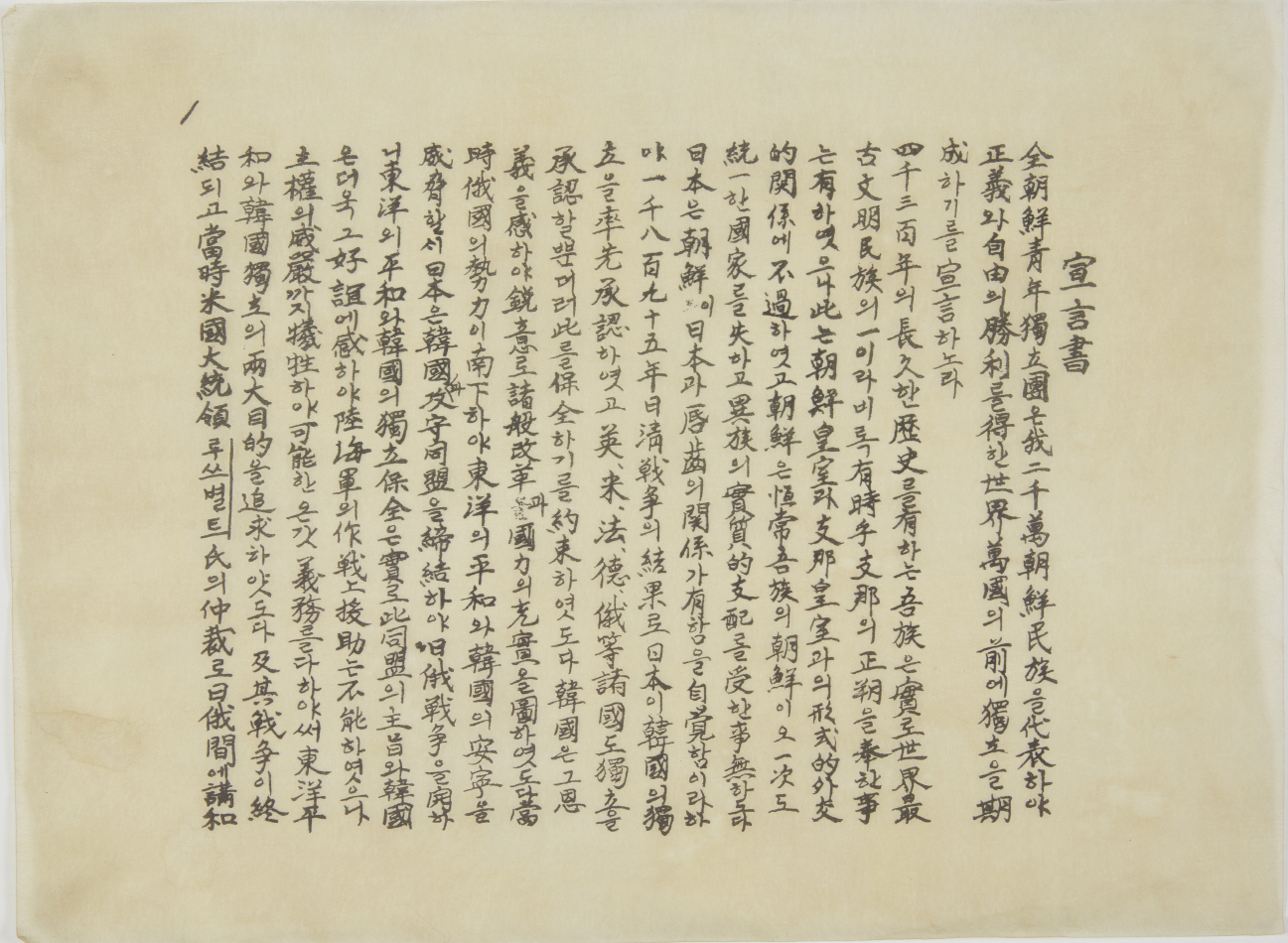
A copy of the first page of the February 8 Declaration of Independence

By the mid-1910s, several hundred Korean students were studying in Japan as part of Japan's cultural assimilation efforts. While there, they were exposed to and developed a variety of ideas, which they discussed and debated. Of particular interest to them were ideas from the West, particularly liberal democracy, which they received in part via the Japanese Taishō Democracy movement and Wilson's Fourteen Points.

By early 1919, their ideas coalesced, and they also became angered by the rebuffing of the Korean representatives to the Paris Peace Conference, by the brutality of Japanese rule, and by the possibility that Gojong had been poisoned. In February, 8,600 students of the Korean Young People's Independence Organization (조선청년독립단; 朝鮮靑年獨立團) proclaimed and publicly distributed a declaration of independence, which they sent to the Japanese government, attendees of the Paris Peace Conference, and to representatives of various countries. The students were arrested en masse by Japanese authorities, although news of their act reached Korea.

== Organization ==
In late 1918, leaders of the native Korean religion Cheondoism, including Kwŏn Tongjin, O Se-chang, and Son Byong-hi, reached a consensus that nonviolent resistance and turning international public opinion against Japan would be effective in advocating for Korea's independence. They also agreed that they needed assistance from other major groups in Korea.

They dispatched representatives to negotiate and secure the cooperation of major politicians and groups in Korea. Some negotiations were strained and took months; they became so disheartened by these setbacks that they reportedly even considered abandoning their plan. However, the events of January and February 1919 caused a spike in pro-independence activism; around this time, they were able to quickly secure a number of significant alliances. They found that some groups had already been independently planning protests. For example, Presbyterian leaders in Pyongyang reportedly had a plan to protest in the last week of January; these efforts were merged into the Cheondoist ones. They secured alliances from major Christian and Buddhist groups, as well as from several student organizations. They gained the support of several former government officials from the Korean Empire, although they were rebuffed by Joseon-era politicians Park Yung-hyo and Han Kyu-sŏl.

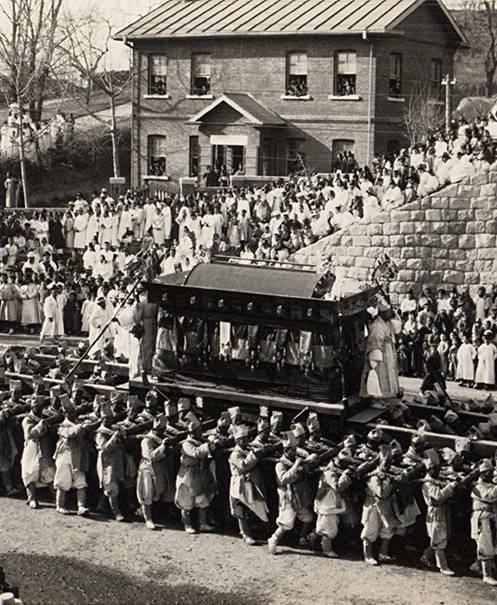
Gojong's funeral procession (March 1, 1919)

They decided to schedule their protest for March 1, the day of Gojong's public funeral, in order to capitalize on the significant number of people congregating in Seoul.

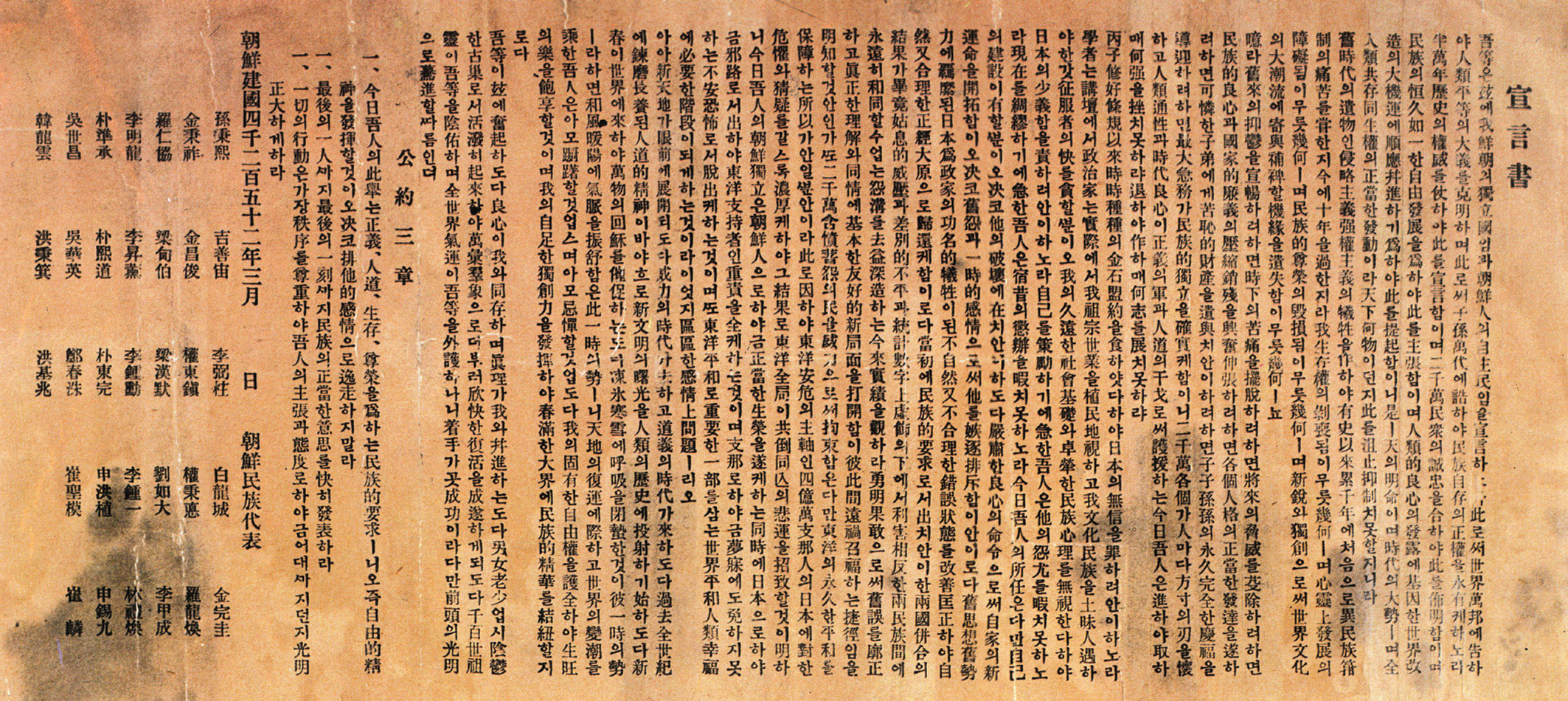
A copy of the Korean Declaration of Independence

From February 25 to 27, thirty-three representatives from these various groups held a series of secret meetings in Seoul, during which they signed the Korean Declaration of Independence. From 6 p.m. to 10 p.m. on February 27, they printed 21,000 copies of the declaration at the printing facilities of Posŏngsa, a publisher affiliated with Cheondoism. On the morning of the 28th, they distributed these copies around the peninsula. They also coordinated the distribution of copies to members of the Korean diaspora, to U.S. President Wilson, and to participants in the Paris Peace Conference. That day, they held a final meeting at Son Byong-hi's house and reviewed their plans for the protests.

They initially planned to start the protest by inviting thousands of observers to Tapgol Park in Seoul. However, they worried that if they were prominently arrested, angered Korean observers could possibly violently retaliate against authorities. In the interest of maintaining the non-violence of the protests, they decided to change the starting location to the less-visible restaurant T'aehwagwan in Insa-dong.

=== Role of foreigners in planning the protests ===
Foreigners also played a role in the planning of the protests. In mid-February, Robert Grierson allowed secret meetings about the protests to be conducted in his house in Sŏngjin. Protests in Sŏngjin went on to become the first in North Hamgyong Province. On February 28th, Canadian missionary Frank Schofield was asked to document the protests. Schofield's publicization of the protests proved so significant in influencing global public opinion, that he has since been described as the "Thirty-fourth Representative" (민족대표 34인), effectively equating his significance to that of the signers of the declaration.

== Beginning ==
Around noon on March 1, 1919, 29 of the 33 signers (Note: The remaining signers were reportedly in the countryside during this time.) of the declaration gathered in T'aehwagwan to start the protest. The signers conducted a prominent reading of the declaration in the restaurant. The Korean restaurant owner An Sunhwan (안순환; 安淳煥) rushed over and reported the event to the Japanese Government-General of Chōsen, which caused the signers to be arrested by around 80 Japanese military police officers.

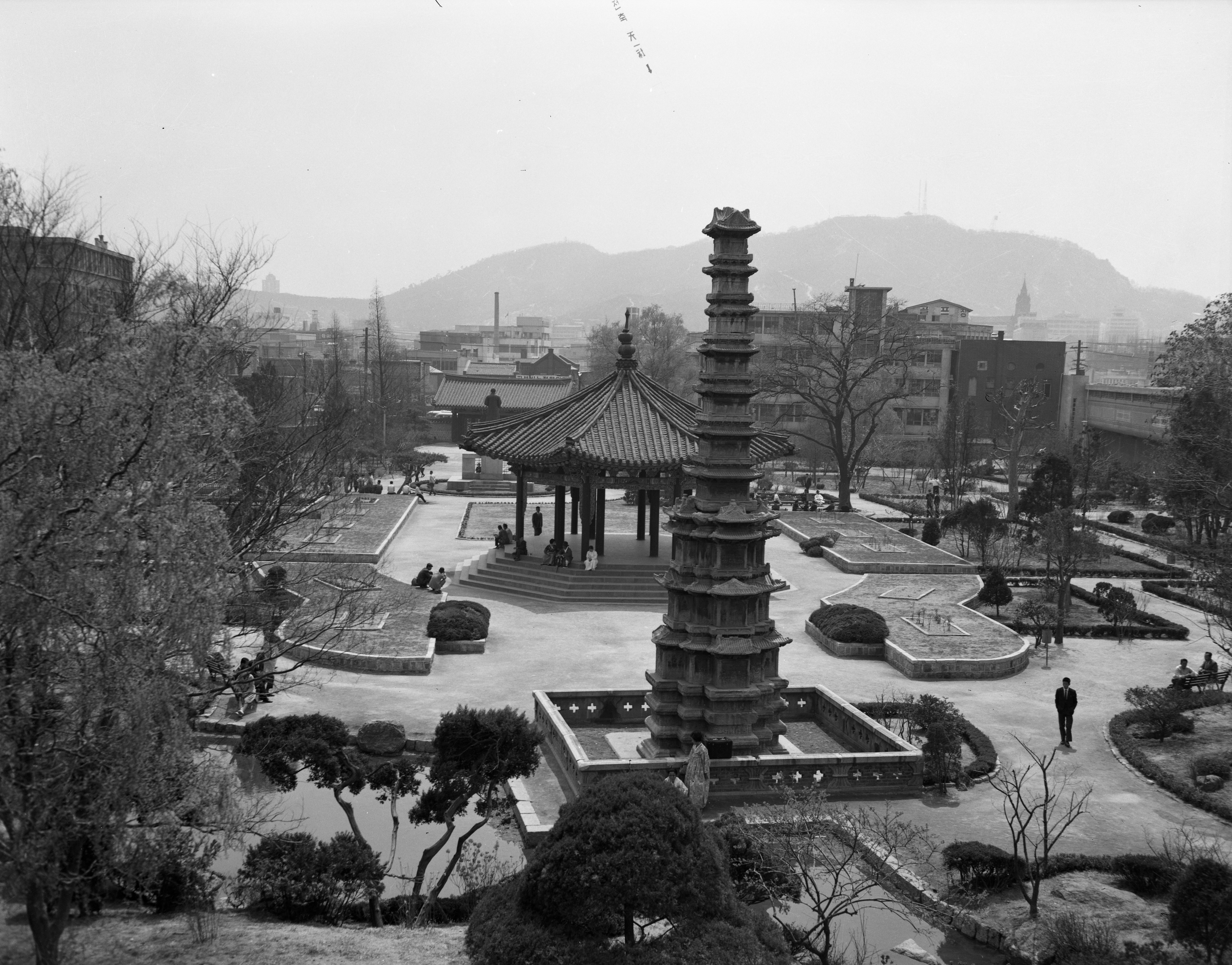
Tapgol Park (1968)

Meanwhile, around 4,000 to 5,000 people assembled at Tapgol Park after hearing there was going to be an announcement made there. Around 2 p.m., an unidentified young man rose up before the crowd and began reading the Korean Declaration of Independence aloud. Near the end of the document's reading, cheers of "long live Korean independence" (대한독립 만세) erupted continually from the crowd, and they filed out onto the main street Jongno for a public march.

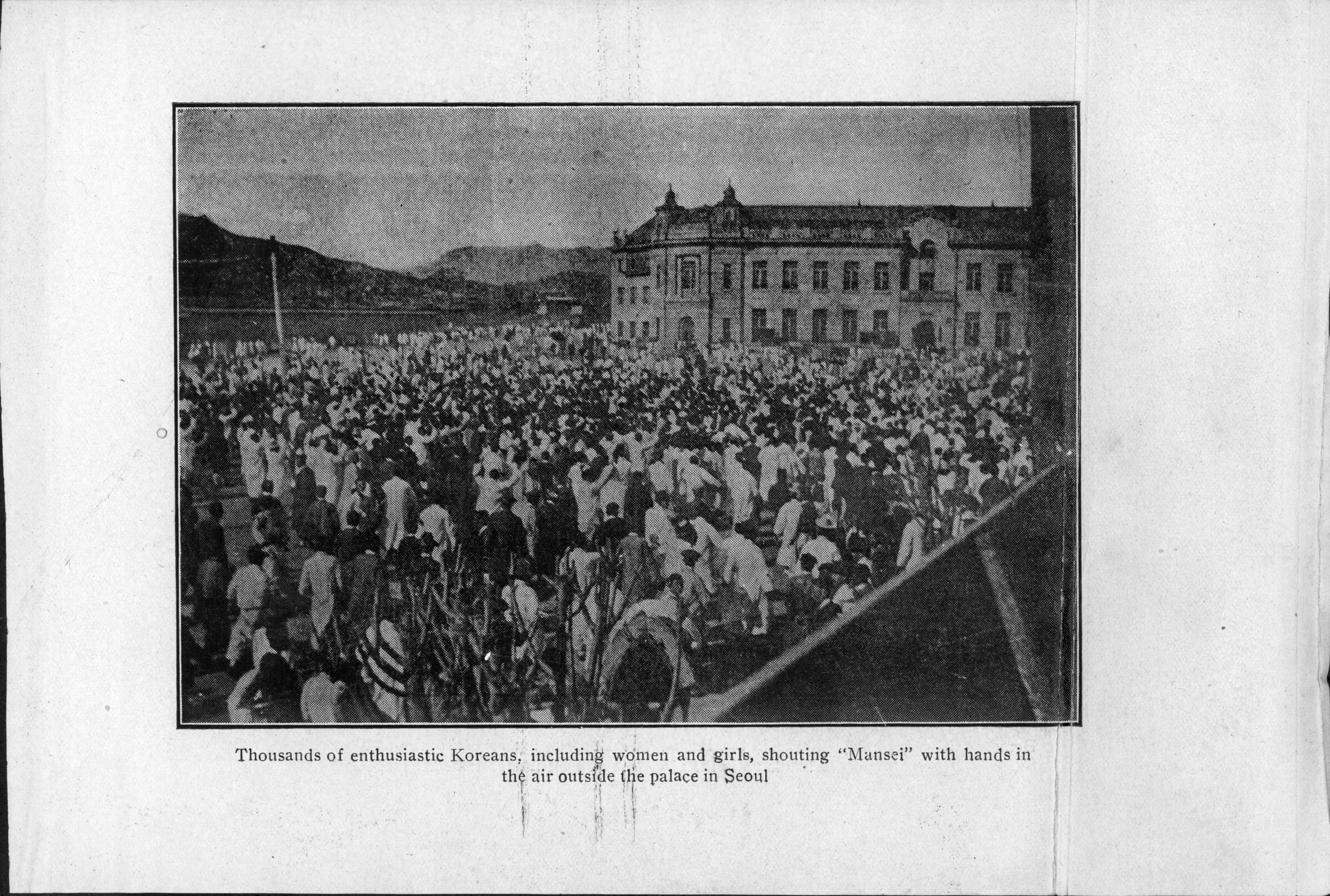
Crowds at Seoul City Hall (March 1919)

By the time the marchers reached the gate Daehanmun of the former royal palace Deoksugung, their numbers had swelled to the tens of thousands. From there, a number of splinter groups marched in different directions throughout the city. News of the protests spread rapidly in Seoul, and marching and public demonstrations continued for many hours afterwards. That day, around 3,000 copies of the declaration were distributed around Seoul.

These protestors were reportedly consistently peaceful. The declaration contains the text "We entertain no spirit of vengeance towards Japan... [L]et there be no violence". The protestors were often met with violent repression by Japanese authorities, which resulted in deaths and arrests.

== Spread ==
That same day, similar protests were held in other cities in Korea, including in Pyongyang, Chinnamp'o, Anju, and Wonsan. Despite Japanese repression of information, news of the protest in Seoul reached these cities quickly, as they were connected to Seoul via the Gyeongui and Gyeongwon railway lines. On March 2, more protests were held in Kaesong and Keiki-dō (Gyeonggi Province). On March 3, more were held in Yesan and Chūseinan-dō (South Chungcheong Province). Protests continued to spread in this fashion, until by March 19, all thirteen provinces of Korea had hosted protests. On March 21, Jeju Island held their first protest. All but seven of the 218 administrative districts in Korea hosted protests.

Various locations often hosted multiple protests for weeks afterwards. Numerous small villages hosted three or four protests. For example, Hoengseong County held a series of protests from March 27 to mid-April. Protests often coincided with market days, and were often held at government offices. The protests were broadly supported across economic and religious spectrums, including groups such as merchants, noblemen, literati, kisaeng, laborers, monks, Christians, Cheondoists, Buddhists, students, and farmers.

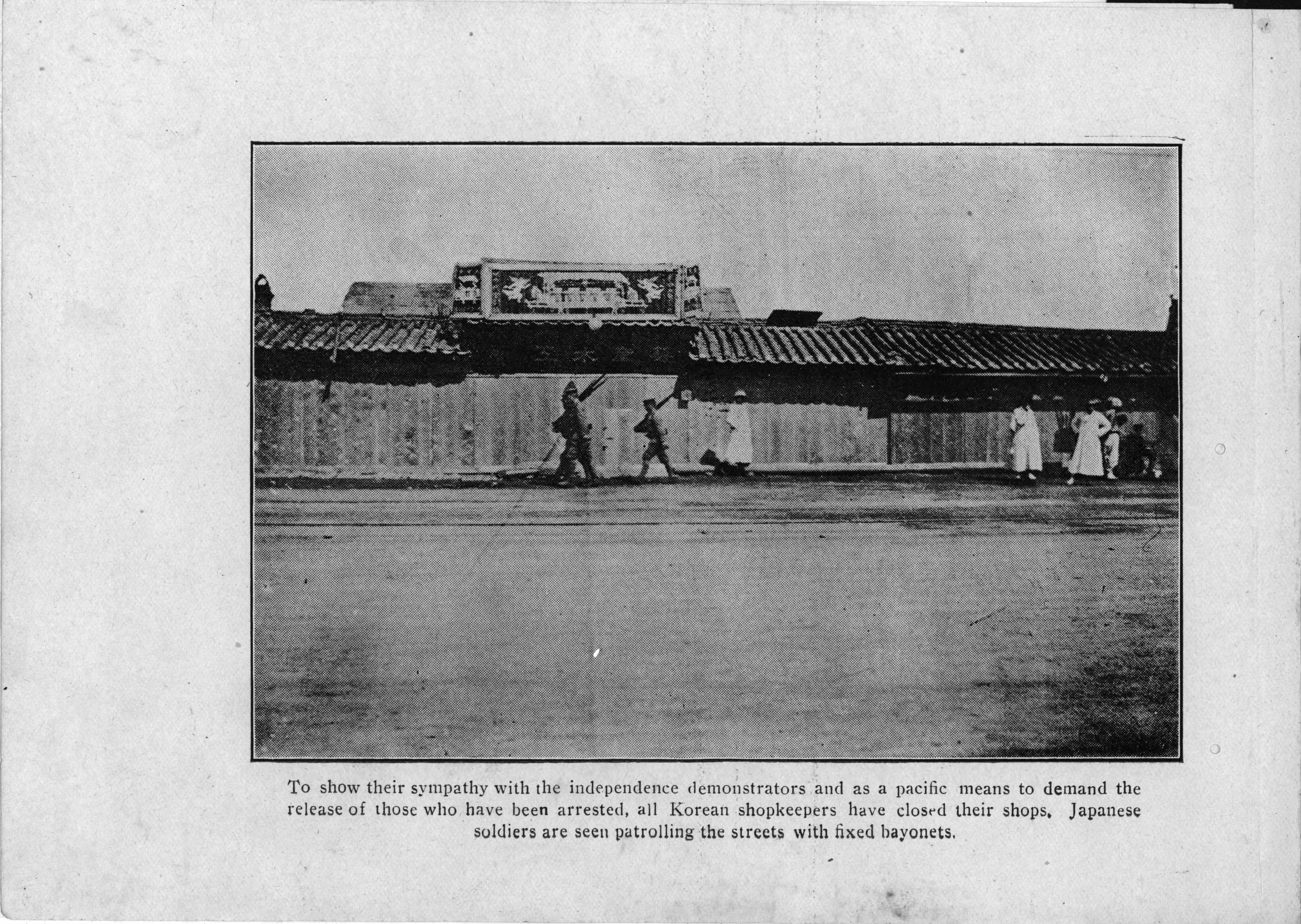
Korean shops closing in solidarity with the protest (1919)

Korean shop owners reportedly closed their doors in solidarity with the protests, with some reportedly refusing to reopen even after Japanese soldiers attempted to force them to. Some shop owners demanded the release of imprisoned protestors.

=== Character of the protests ===
The protests were decentralized and diverse. The diversity in the protests was influenced by local culture and religion. In some regions, Christians played a more significant role in organizing protests, and in others Cheondoists were more significant. The scholar Kim Jin-bong argued that Christians played a larger role in regions with more developed transportation, and Cheondoists in regions with less developed transportation. According to one estimate, 17% of arrests made during the protests were of Christians, when they composed less than 1% of the population. 58.4% of arrests were of peasants, and 3.9% were of laborers.

The Pyongan region played what historian Michael Shin argued was an outsized role in the protests. Many of the movement's earliest protests were in the region, and a plurality of the signers were from there (11 of the 33). This region contained the second-largest city in Korea Pyongyang, was a center of Christianity, and produced a large number of intellectuals. North Hamgyong Province was the last province to join the protests; they began on March 10. Its protests have been characterized as less intense than others, possibly due to transportation being less developed there, as well as security being tighter due to it being on the border with both Russia and China. In addition, the ratio of Japanese security forces to civilians was lower in the area. In Chūseihoku-dō (North Chungcheong Province) and Chūseinan-dō, some radical groups attacked and destroyed Japanese government offices and police stations. Zenrahoku-dō (North Jeolla Province) had protests that have been characterized as less intense than others. This has been attributed to the region being relatively depleted after having previously heavily participated in the 1894–1895 Donghak Peasant Revolution and subsequent righteous army conflicts. In this province and in Zenranan-dō (South Jeolla Province), students often played a significant role in protests.

Women both led and participated in many of the protests. A group of female students wrote a public letter entitled "From Korean School Girls" to world leaders that was reprinted in international newspapers. The role of women in the protests was hailed by international feminist observers, and described as a milestone in their changing social status, especially in contrast to their status during the conservative Joseon period.

=== Korean diaspora protests ===
==== Manchuria ====
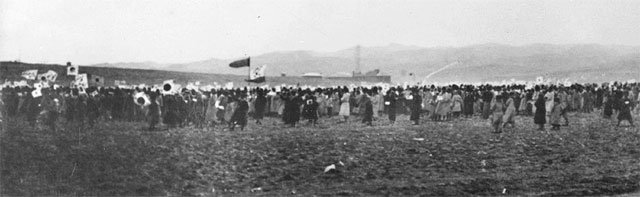
The Longjing Manse Movement (March 13, 1919)

On March 7, Koreans in Manchuria learned of the movement. They held a large protest in Longjing on March 13. Estimates of the number of protestors vary, although some put the number of protestors at around 20,000 to 30,000. This was around 10% of the total Korean population of the region at the time. One person, who had sent her son to the protest, later recalled what she had heard of it: (Note: 저녁 때 들으니 사방에서 인사들이 소식을 듣고 모여 인산인해를 이루었다고 한다. 정오 종소리에 맞춰 용정 부근 서전대야에 큰 조선독립 깃발을 세우고 사람마다 태극기를 들고 조선독립만세를 부르며 독립을 선언했다. 깃발은 해를 가리고 함성은 우레와 같았다. 이를 본 왜인의 얼굴색이 잿빛으로 변했다.)

I heard that a large crowd of people gathered from all over to hear the news. After the noon bell finished ringing, a large flag celebrating Korea's independence was unfurled. Everyone raised their own flags and shouted "long live Korean independence". The flag blocked the sun, and the shouting echoed like thunder. When the Japanese authorities saw this, their faces turned ashen.

Japanese authorities pressured the Chinese warlord Zhang Zuolin into suppressing the protest. This resulted in around 17 to 19 deaths. Like in Korea, the Koreans continued to hold protests for weeks afterwards; by mid-May they would host at least 50 more.

==== Russia ====
Koreans in Russia also learned of the protests, and began organizing their own. In Ussuriysk, a protest was held and suppressed on March 17. The Russian Empire and the Empire of Japan had been part of the Allies of World War I, and had signed agreements to suppress the Korean independence movement. Inspired by the Ussuriysk protest, the Koreans of the enclave Sinhanch'on in Vladivostok launched their own that same day, which was also suppressed. They launched another the following day.

In Moscow on August 12, a public rally in support of the March First Movement was held, and was reportedly attended by around 200 people, including at least one Soviet politician. The rally was left-leaning; its speakers, including an ethnic Korean Red Army officer (likely Yi Ouitjyong), interpreted the movement in a socialist framework and advocated for Koreans to ally with the Soviet Union and fight Japan.

==== United States ====
Koreans in Hawaii organized an impromptu meeting upon hearing of the protests that was attended by around 600. A followup meeting dubbed the First Korean Congress was symbolically held in Philadelphia, which they viewed as "the cradle of liberty" in the U.S. They sent statements to President Wilson, but were ignored.

== Suppression ==
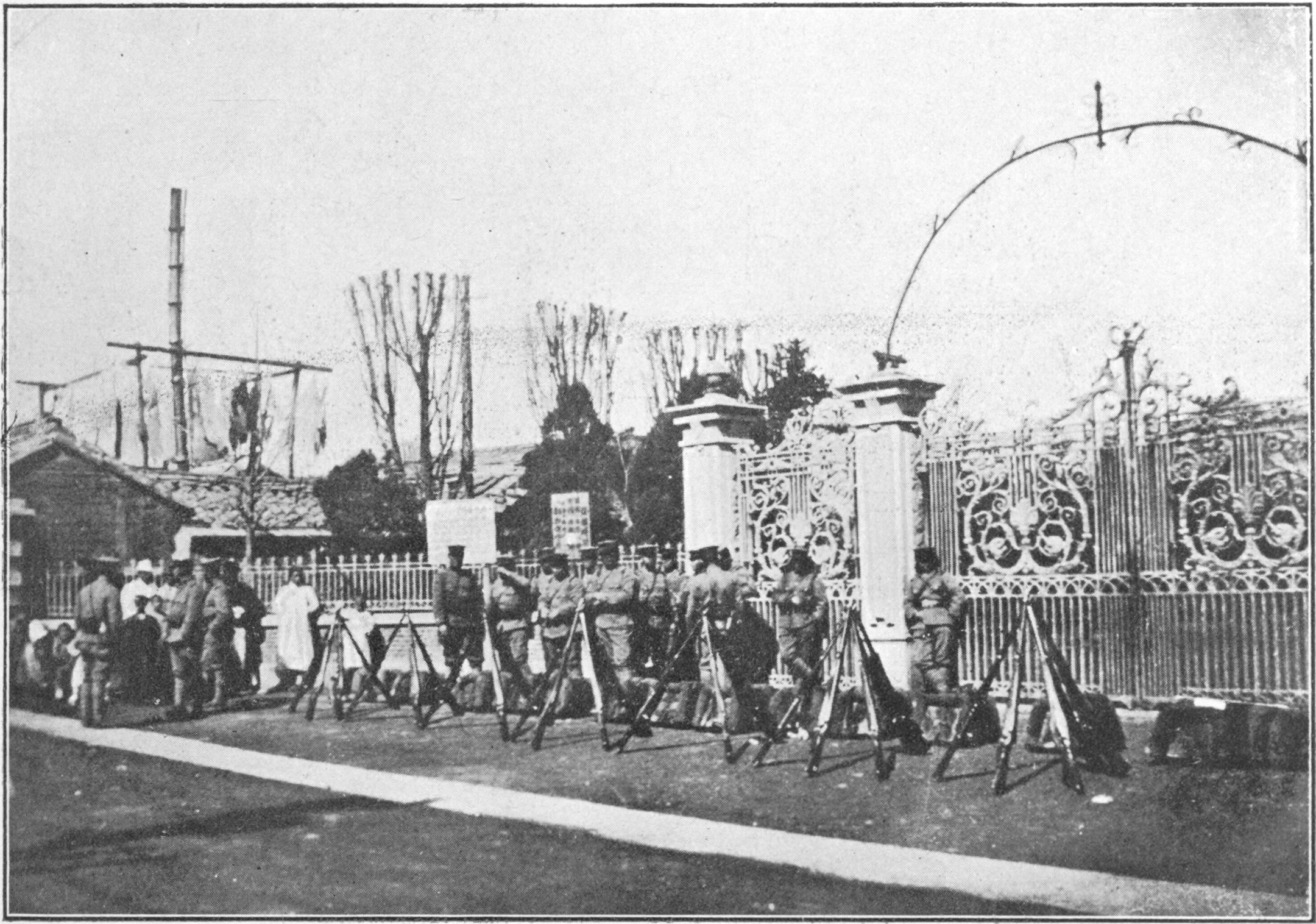
Japanese authorities blockading Tapgol Park (1919)

The Japanese Government-General of Chōsen was reportedly unaware that the protests would occur until they began, and was surprised by the scale and intensity of them. It rushed to recruit people from various backgrounds, including firemen and security guards at railroads, to stop the protests. The government-general received more military police and police officers from Japan, as well as more army divisions. They equipped these groups with lethal weapons and distributed them around Korea.

A significant number of mass murders of Korean civilians occurred. There are numerous reports of Japanese authorities around the peninsula opening fire or conducting organized bayonet charges on unarmed protestors.

During an intense raid on Suwon and Anseong, Japanese authorities reportedly burnt 276 private homes down, killed 29, and arrested around 2,000 people. Many Koreans were tortured and executed. On April 6, the Sucheon-ri massacre occurred, during which Japanese authorities entered a village at night, set it on fire, and killed people who attempted to put the fires out. On April 15, during the now infamous Jeamni massacre, Japanese authorities lured 20 to 30 Korean civilians into a church, opened fire on them, then burned the church down to hide evidence of the killings.

Photographs of the protests' suppression

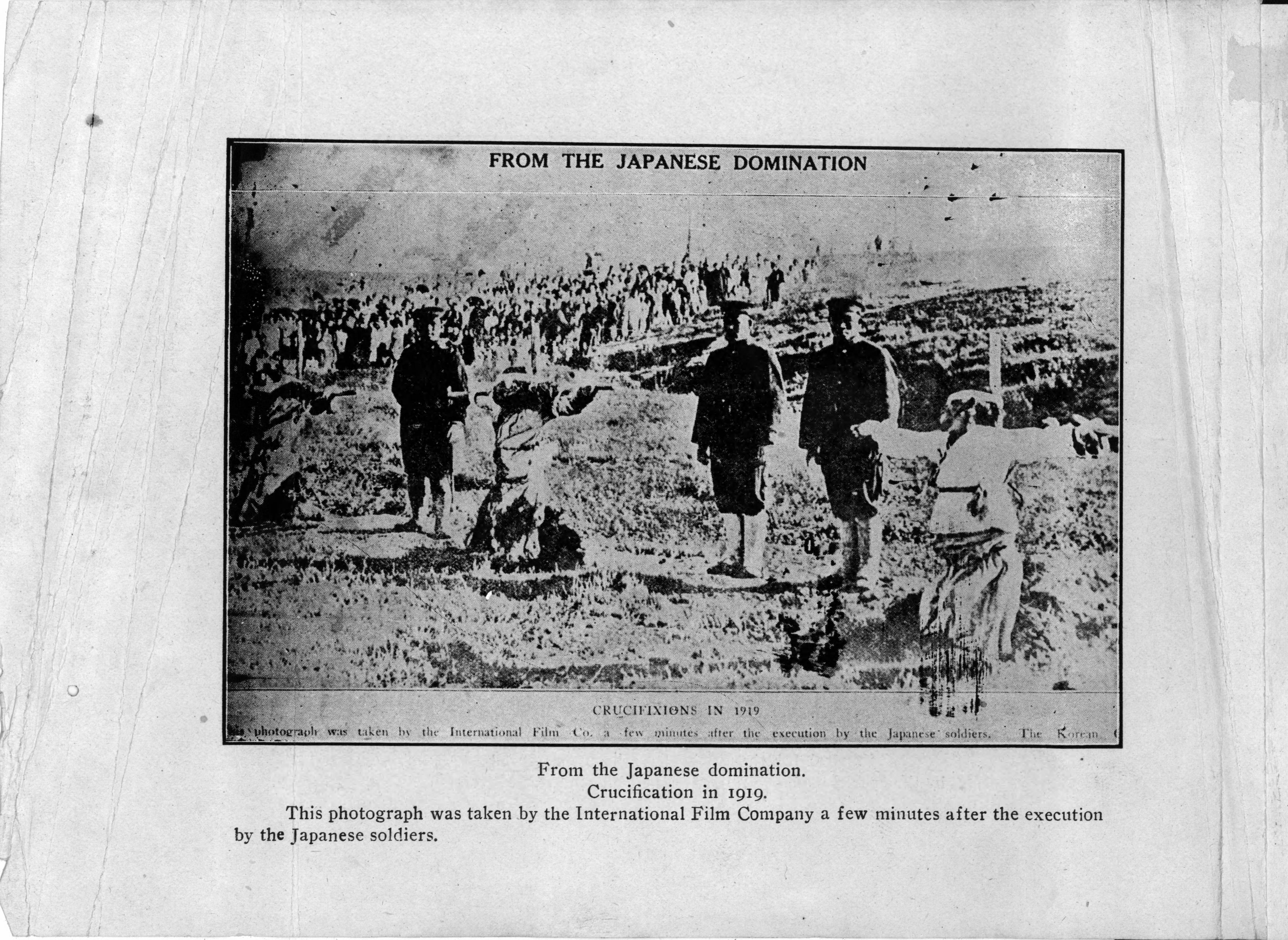

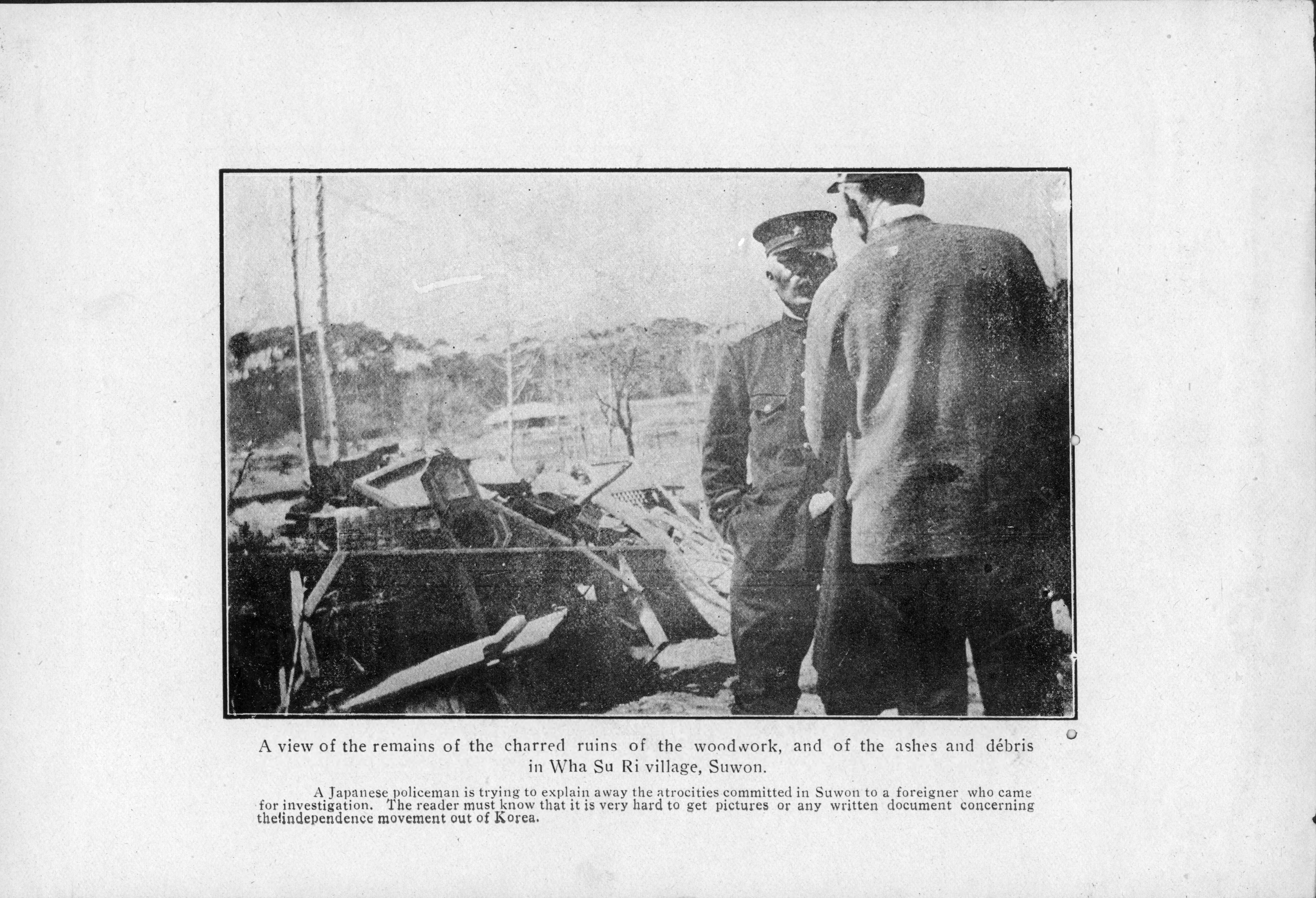

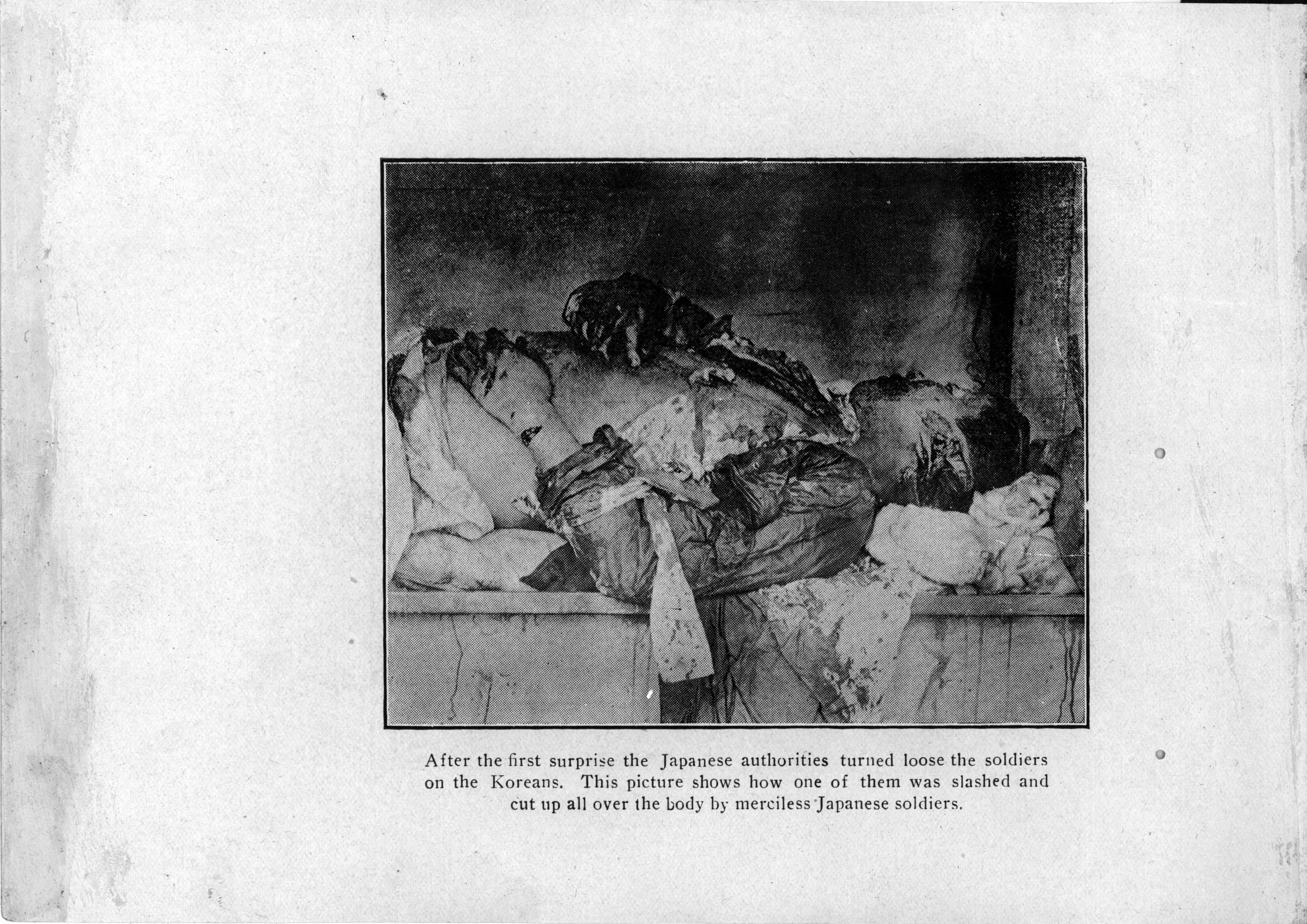

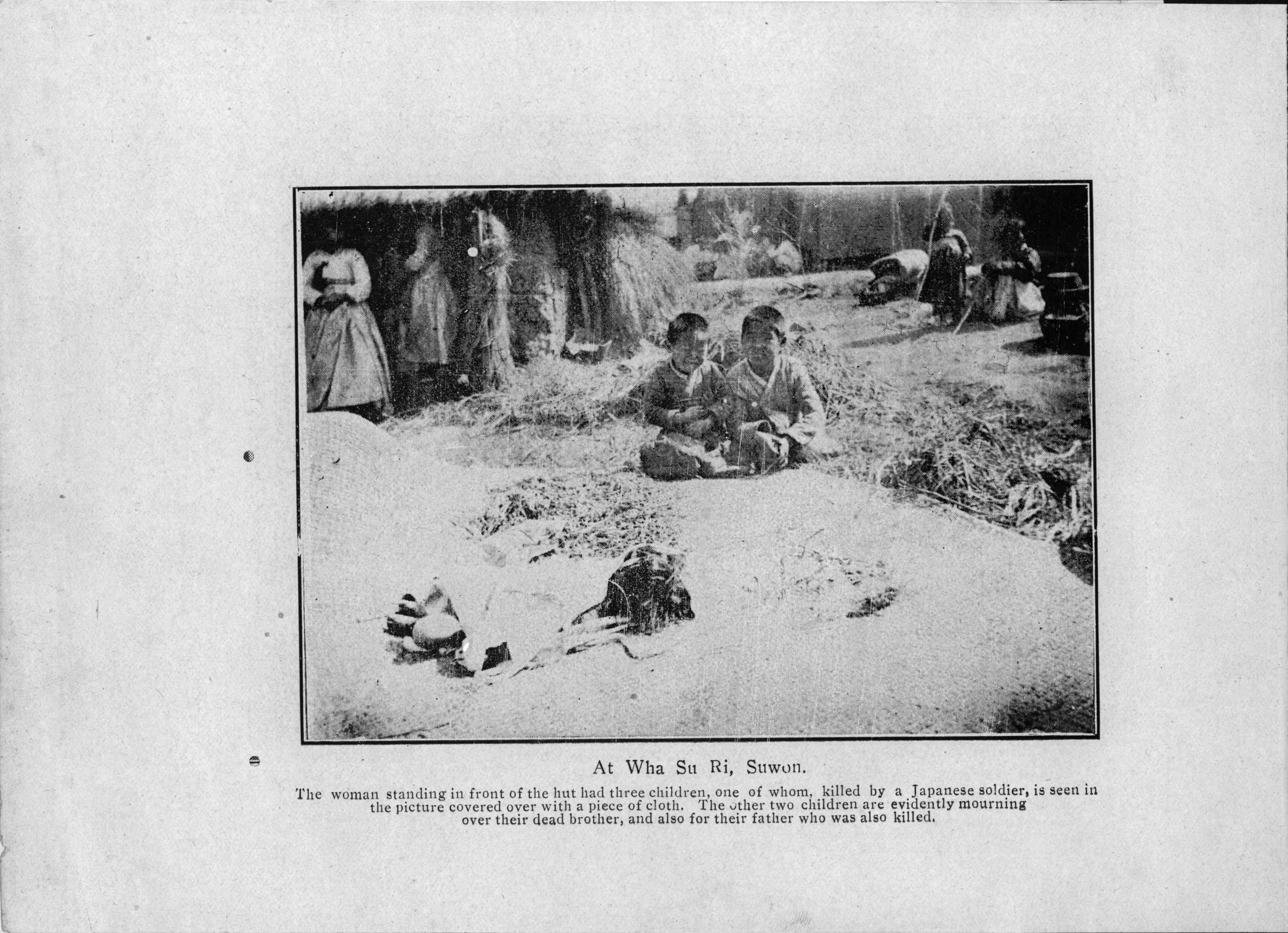

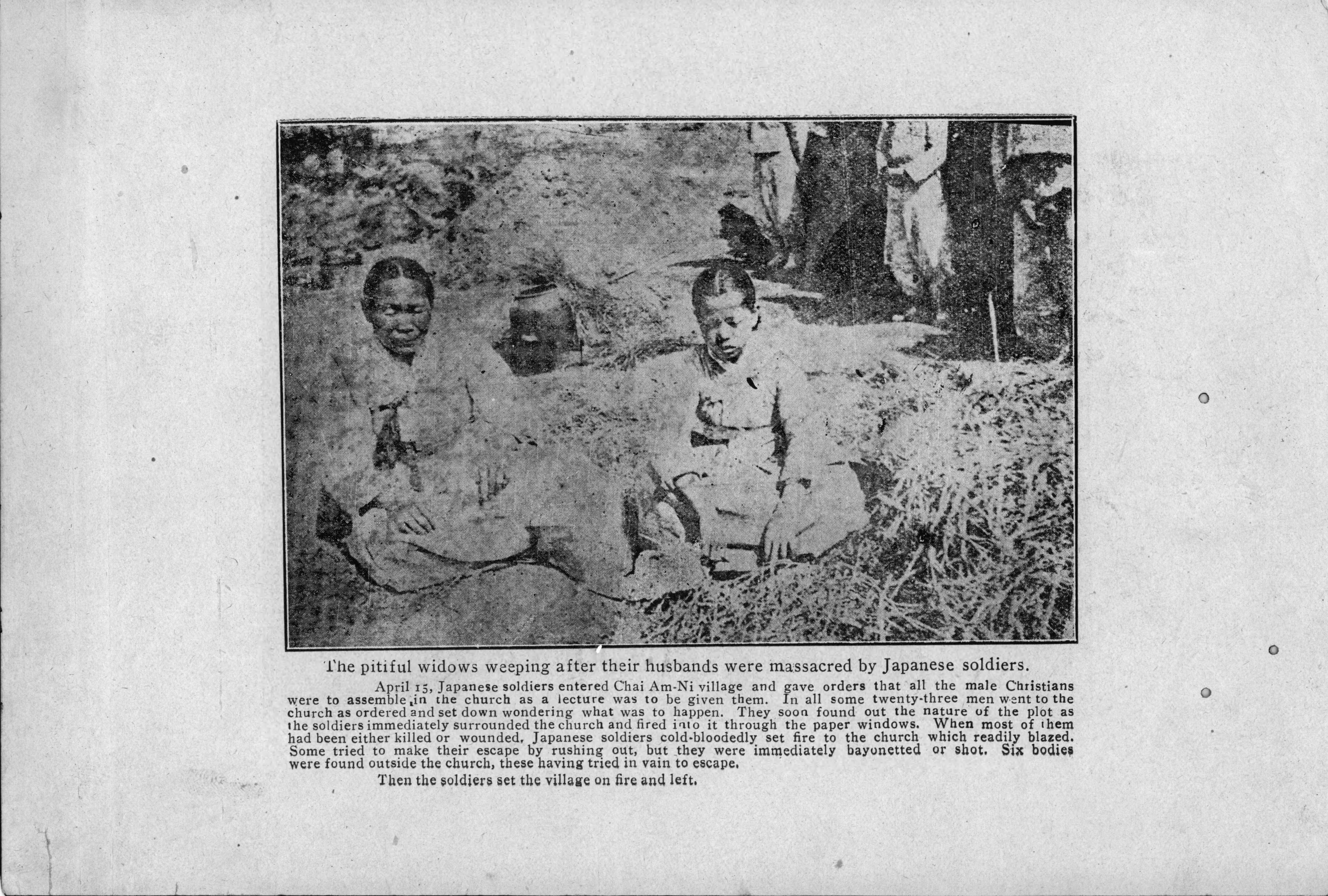

There are reports of crucifixions being performed on Korean Christians; this is attested to in one photograph, which was reprinted in American newspapers and paired with expressions of outrage. Korean schoolgirls are attested to being stripped and publicly flogged. An anecdote attested to claims a girl had her hand cut off by a Japanese soldier because she was holding a copy of the declaration. She then reportedly switched to holding the item in her other hand, and continued to protest.

One female student of Ewha Haktang gave a testimony that was later submitted into the American Congressional Record:

It was on the 5th of March that I [joined a] procession at the South Gate. As we neared the Palace, a Japanese policeman seized me by the hair, and I was thrown violently to the ground. He kicked me mercilessly, and I was rendered almost unconscious. He rushed me along by my hair, and I was led to the Chongno Police Station. At the entrance of the police office twenty or more Japanese policemen, who stood in line, kicked me and struck me [...] in the face so many times... I was made to kneel down with my legs bound together, and each question and answer was accompanied alternately by blows to the face...

An April 12 cablegram, sent from Shanghai to the Korean National Association in San Francisco, read:

Japan began massacring in Korea. Over [one] thousand unarmed people killed in Seoul during three hours' demonstration on the twenty-eighth. Japanese troops, fire brigades, and civilians are ordered [to shoot, beat, and hook [sic]] people mercilessly throughout Korea. Killed several thousand since twenty-seventh. Churches, schools, homes of leaders destroyed. Women made naked and beaten before crowds, especially leaders' family. The imprisoned being severely tortured. Doctors are forbidden caring wounded. Foreign Red Cross urgently needed.

Foreigners were also reportedly persecuted by Japanese authorities. American missionary Eli M. Mowry was sentenced to hard labor for allegedly harboring demonstrators. An American woman was reportedly attacked in Pyongyang. According to the League of Friends of Korea, two American women "were beaten by the Japanese soldiers for no other reason than they were sympathetic with the Koreans". Japanese authorities searched the residences of foreigners, reportedly without warrant.

According to an August 15 article in the Soviet newspaper Izvestia, gatherings became treated with suspicion by Japanese authorities. In one instance, after a Korean attendee of a wedding was found to have documents linking him to the independence movement, Japanese authorities raided the wedding and conducted mass beatings and arrests.

=== Prison conditions ===
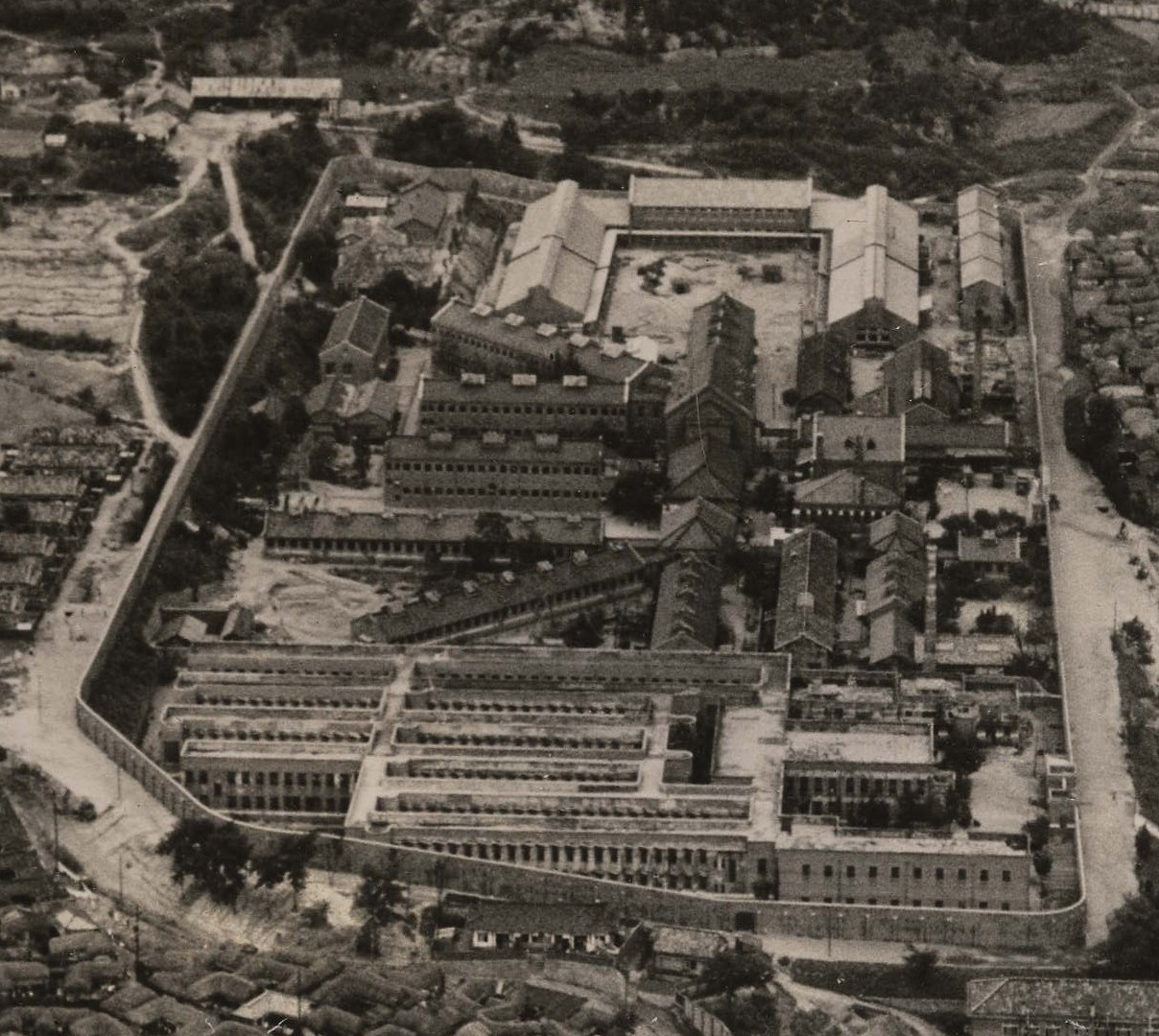
Seodaemun Prison, where many arrestees were kept. (1945)

There are numerous reports of prison conditions being extremely poor. Seoul's Seodaemun Prison became infamous for the mistreatment and extrajudicial killings of prisoners. There, women were stripped naked in front of male guards. An April 22, 1919 pamphlet by the Presbyterian Church in America read:

[When] they put Korean women in the question box—this, mind you, is before they are condemned at all—they are stripped absolutely naked... From here they have to walk across an open court where they can be seen by any one who pleases... Some women, who tried to cover themselves, had their hands tied behind them.

There are reports that conditions were extremely cramped and dirty, and that some rooms were so cramped that people were unable to sit or lie down. William R. Giles, a reporter for the Chicago Daily News, reportedly witnessed 30 prisoners being kept in a single 10 ft × 6 ft (3.0 m × 1.8 m) room in a Pyongyang prison. Koreans were reportedly kept separate from Japanese prisoners, and given worse facilities. Another issue was heating; physician Jessie Hirst, head of Severance Hospital, reported that four nurses from his hospital were arrested for protesting in the winter of 1919. They were kept in conditions so cold that their hands, feet, and one of their faces froze. There are reports that prisoners were made to strip down in one building and run to another in the cold. One woman reportedly was made to walk from one prison barefoot through the snow to another in order to be processed for her release.

After experiencing poor treatment during her prison intake, one girl was reportedly let go the following day without ever being formally charged of any crimes, nor ever going to trial.

=== Yu Gwan-sun ===
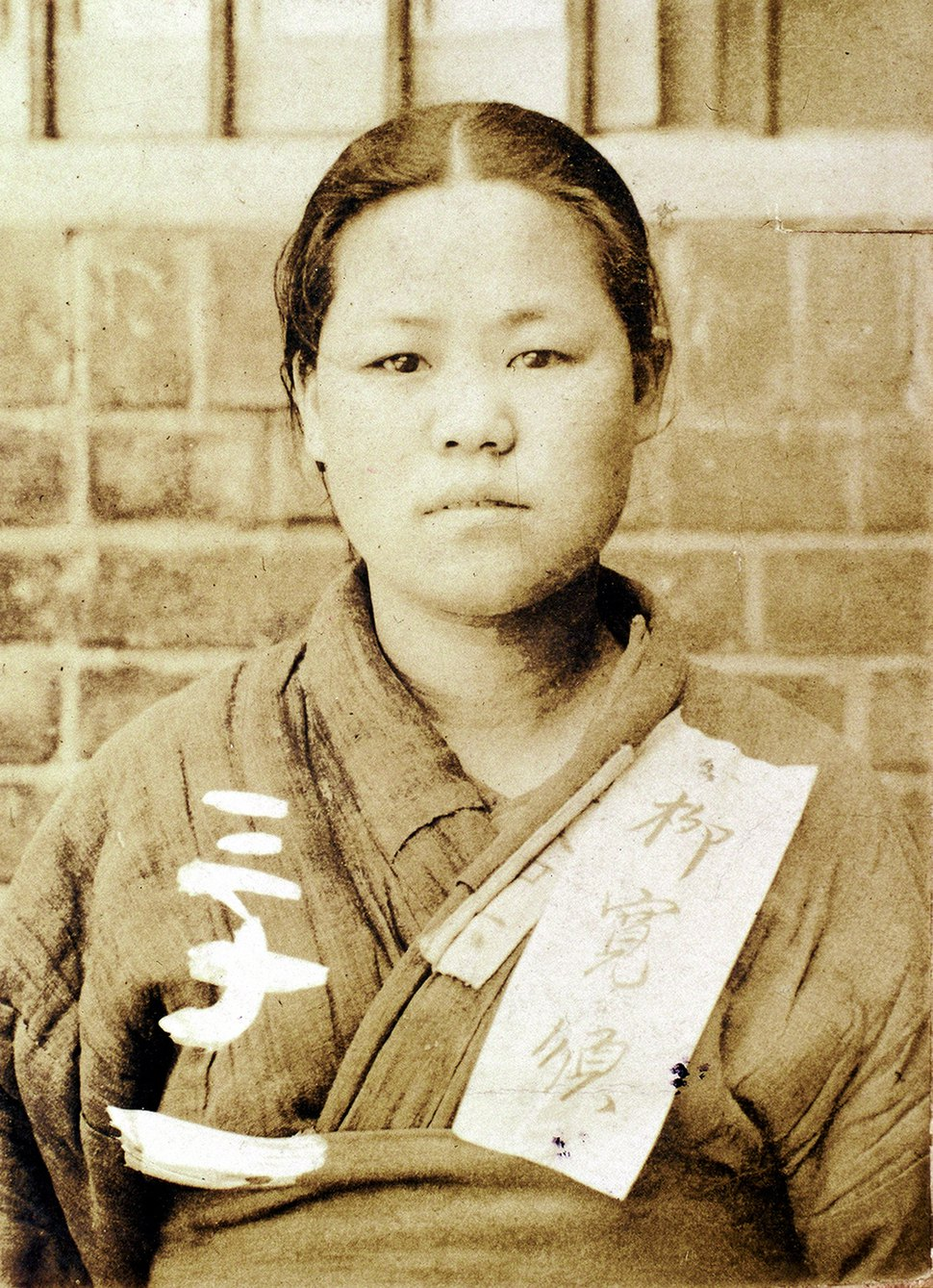
A mug shot of Yu (1919)

Yu Gwan-sun, a 16-year-old participant in the protests, has since become a symbol of March First Movement, and is now remembered in South Korea as a martyr. On the first day of the protests, Yu, then a student at Ewha Haktang, participated in the protest in Seoul. On March 5, she participated in another protest at Namdaemun in Seoul and was arrested. Missionaries from her school negotiated her release. She then returned to her hometown of Cheonan, albeit with a smuggled copy of the Declaration of Independence. From there, she went from village to village, spreading the news of the protests and encouraging people to organize their own. On April 1, 3,000 protestors gathered in Cheonan. The Japanese military police opened fire on the protestors and killed 19; among the dead were Yu's parents.

Yu was arrested and detained at Seodaemun Prison. She was reportedly unrepentant despite repeated beatings and torture. She eventually died of her injuries on September 28, 1920.

== Statistics ==
Statistics on the March First Movement are uncertain, and are a subject of controversy.

=== March First Movement Database ===
In 2019, the National Institute of Korean History (NIKH) of South Korea published an online March First Movement Database (삼일운동 데이터베이스) to commemorate the 100th anniversary of the movement. The compilation of the database began in 2016, and was reportedly the largest ever data gathering on the movement. It also represented the first time that the South Korean government promoted a single set of statistics on the movement. The database aggregates evidence and numbers from over 27,729 sources; these have been digitized and are available on the website. The database has been updated on at least one occasion to reflect the NIKH's ongoing research on the movement.

The database intentionally provides conservative estimates on the protests; the database's curators suspect that actual numbers are much higher. Events and numbers are reportedly only included if there is known surviving evidence for them that is deemed sufficiently reliable. A significant portion of evidence used for the database comes from Japanese sources; the colonial government was known to alter its records for political reasons. The instability during and extrajudicial actions taken during the movement's suppression also reduced the amount of surviving evidence.

March First Movement Database summary statistics (March 1 – May 31, 1919)
Region	# protests (Note: A number of protest actions in some places occurred in quick succession; some of these are counted as single events.)	# participants (lower bound) (Note: Each event has lower and upper bound estimates for its various statistics. Upper bounds still reflect the conservative methodology reportedly employed.)	# participants (upper bound)	# deaths (lower bound)	# deaths (upper bound)
Gyeonggi	415	217,009	297,380	121	151
Hwanghae	180	46,943	57,179	42	42
Pyongan	276	166,430	213,863	285	426
Hamgyong	144	51,667	60,453	45	52
Gangwon	81	20,376	25,629	33	35
Chungcheong	225	103,355	133,431	84	109
Jeolla	89	13,693	21,626	12	12
Gyeongsang	273	129,695	174,467	153	317
Jiandao (China)	86	46,715	52,875	23	26
Japan	1	0 (Note: Protest in Osaka's Tennōji Park on March 19.)	0	0	0
Russian State	13	25,500	26,050	0	0
United States (Note: Includes the U.S. Territory of Hawaii, as well as events hosted in the U.S. with representatives from elsewhere in North America.)	13	2,550	2,550	0	0
Mexico	2	69	69	0	0
Total	1,798	823,702 (Note: This sum reflects the overall total, and does not equal the sum of the above cells in the column. A small number of reported events took place across regions; for these, the counts are not separated by region. Summing the rows would result in participants in these events being counted multiple times.)	1,065,172	798	1,170
Notes:

# protests by month (1919)
March	April	May	June	July	August	September	October	November	December
1,067	695	11	2	4	2	0	6	10	3

=== Park Eun-sik's statistics ===
Many sources cite the statistics provided in the 1920 history book The Bloody History of the Korean Independence Movement by Korean scholar Park Eun-sik.

1920 statistics from Park Eun-sik
Region	# protests	# participants	# deaths	# injuries	# arrests
Gyeonggi	297	665,900	1,472	3,124	4,680
Hwanghae	115	92,670	238	414	4,218
Pyongan	315	514,670	2,042	3,665	11,610
Hamgyong	101	59,850	135	667	6,215
Gangwon	57	99,510	144	645	1,360
Chungcheong	156	120,850	590	1,116	5,233
Jeolla	222	294,800	384	767	2,900
Gyeongsang	223	154,498	2,470	5,295	1,085
Overseas	51	48,700	34	157	5
Total	1,542	2,023,098	7,509	15,961	46,948

An article in the Encyclopedia of Korean Culture argues it is possible that the numbers are even higher, as Japanese authorities continued pursuing and arresting protestors for years afterwards.

=== Japanese statistics ===
One Japanese police report claimed that there were 1,214 protests with 1.1 million participants; South Korean historian Kwon Tae-eok argued that Japanese sources were incentivized to artificially lower these numbers, and evaluated Park's estimate as plausible.

From March 1 to April 11, Japanese officials reported 553 people killed, and more than 12,000 arrested. They said that 8 policemen and military were killed, and 158 wounded. Japanese soldiers were harmed during the protests, with a number of deaths and over a hundred wounded.

== Japanese disinformation campaign ==
Japan attempted to stop information about the event from leaving the peninsula. Major Japanese newspapers made some initial reports on the event; they almost uniformly downplayed its scale and did not cover it as the main story. Eventually, the Japanese government issued restrictions on what could be published of the protests, (Note: Scholar Penny Bailey argues that while the extent of regulations on Japanese coverage of the movement is unclear, such regulation was typical at the time. Bailey also argues that self-regulation was possibly practiced because of how the Home Ministry's Police Bureau had previously censored and punished critical reporting.) and coverage on them significantly slowed. The English-language newspapers The Japan Chronicle and The Japan Advertiser published a number of articles that were about the violent suppression of the movement, with the latter covering the events of the Jeamni massacre.

=== Information leak ===
Foreign witnesses in Korea played a significant role in documenting and photographing the movement, as well as sharing information on it abroad. The first communication on it to leave the Japanese empire was in English and went to Shanghai. This led to the first international article on the movement being published there on March 4. News of the protests first reached the United States on March 10, via a cablegram sent by Korean independence activists in Shanghai to San Francisco. By the following day, the story appeared in American papers. Some articles questioned the veracity of the story; in the March 11 issue of the Honolulu Star-Bulletin, judge John Albert Matthewman, who had previously volunteered for the Red Cross in Korea, stated that he felt that Koreans in Shanghai had fabricated the story. He argued that Japan had been so repressive that such a large-scale protest was nearly impossible.

=== Japanese statements ===
Japan had been conducting a public relations campaign in the U.S. for at least a decade prior to the movement. Information on Korea had previously largely reached the U.S. through well-funded Japanese media channels. These narratives deliberately portrayed Korea as in need of civilizing, and Japan as a positive influence on the peninsula.

In response to the increasing numbers of foreign inquiries, various Japanese entities released public statements that promoted a range of narratives. Some denied that protests had occurred in Korea at all, some downplayed the scale of them, and some claimed that they had been fully suppressed much earlier than in reality. There are records of the Japanese Ministry of Foreign Affairs requesting that the United States and Germany stop their newspapers from publishing claims about the protests that it deemed to be rumors.

A number of Japanese statements described the protests as the violent riots of extremist upstarts, highlighted Japanese casualties of the protests, and claimed any violence while suppressing the protests was done in self defense. Some statements, such as one published in the Great Falls Daily Tribune on April 15, 1919, portrayed the protests as left-wing Bolshevik uprisings, and portrayed Japan as attempting to halt the spread of communism. Many statements blamed Christian missionaries for inciting the unrest.

In April 1919, Japanese politician Gotō Shinpei gave a speech at a luncheon attended by U.S. Treasurer John Burke. Gotō argued that Japan was on a civilizing mission in Korea and that its intentions were noble. He blamed reported abuses on low-level colonial authorities. He argued that Korea's annexation was legal, and likened the legal arguments for the annexation to those used to justify the American occupations of Puerto Rico and of the Philippines.

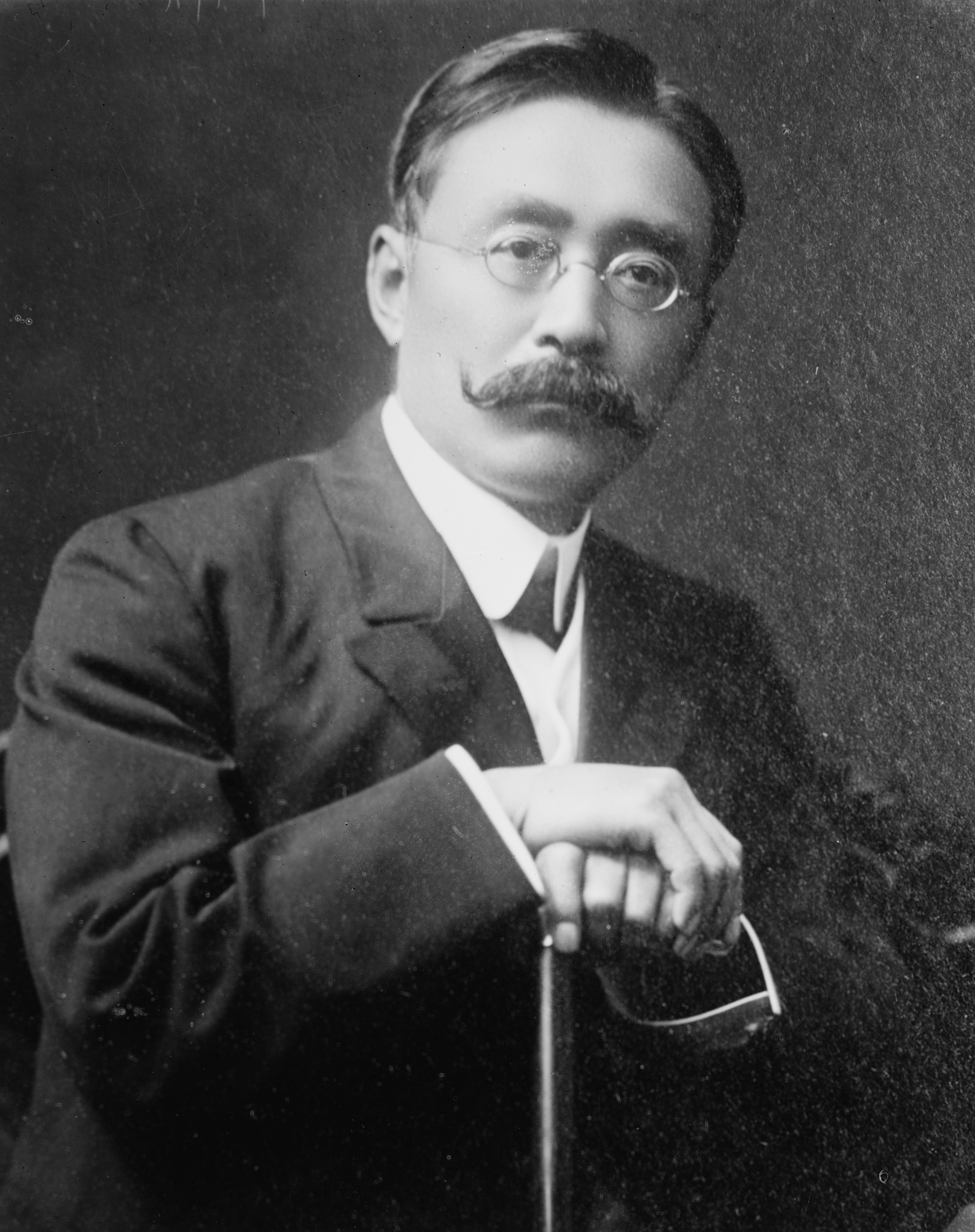
Nitobe Inazō argued that Koreans were uncivilized and incapable of self-governance.

Japanese diplomats published statements in which they claimed Koreans were uncivilized and incapable of self-governance. Japanese academic Nitobe Inazō toured the U.S. and gave speeches and wrote articles promoting these narratives. In a June 24 article, he argued that Koreans were so incapable of self-governance, that if Japan granted them independence for a six-month trial period, they would request to be colonized again.

Articles in the colonial government–backed newspaper Keijō Nippō echoed these narratives. One such article read:

Koreans believe that after the President of the United States [Woodrow Wilson] established the League of Nations, even small and weak countries would avoid the domination of Great Powers, and be able to maintain their national independence. How foolish they are! Ah, [you] pitiful Koreans! You are governed by evil thoughts... Awake! Awake! ...If you do not have an understanding of the situation of the world, you will be doomed to perish.

In January 1920, Governor-General Saitō published a four-page statement in the magazine The Independent, in which he argued that Koreans had been exaggerating or completely lying about the protests. He argued that Japan had "no other desire than to improve the condition of the Korean people". He claimed that he would create a government so good that Koreans would choose to abandon their identity in order to become Japanese. His administration published a number of texts in English about Korea, such as Pictorial Korea and Educational Korea, that promoted these messages.

=== Statements from foreign supporters of Japan ===
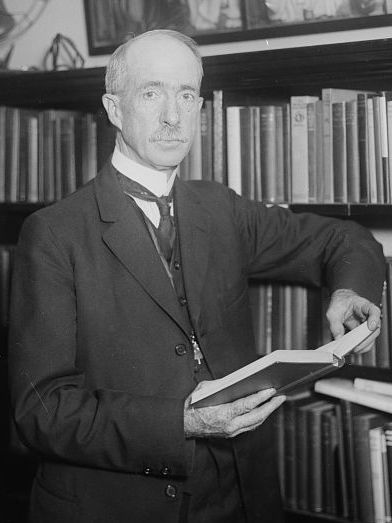
Westerners such as Sidney Gulick advocated for Japan's continued rule over Korea. (1919)

Foreigners sympathetic to Japan repeated claims that Koreans were uncivilized and incapable of self-governance; their statements were published in various newspapers internationally. Examples include Prof. Edmund Davison of Drew University (who was born in Japan), Sidney Gulick, and former diplomatic advisor to Japan George Trumbull Ladd.

The English Church Mission (ECM) in Korea, unlike a significant majority of other missionaries in Korea, often expressed views more sympathetic to Japan. Their reports expressed doubt that Japanese authorities were intentionally killing Korean protestors.

=== Rebuttals from foreigners ===
In March, thirty foreign missionaries in Korea met and planned how they could draw international attention to Japan's acts in Korea; they reportedly adopted the slogan "No Neutrality for Brutality". Schofield and other foreign missionaries documented the protests and shared information with the international press. In August, Schofield traveled to Japan on behalf of the missionaries in Korea. He conducted a range of activities to publicize what he had seen. He met with Prime Minister Hara Takashi and other prominent Japanese politicians and asked them to take action to stop the violent suppression of the protests. He gave a public lecture to hundreds of foreign missionaries in Japan, in which he strongly criticized colonial policies. The missionaries published a number of articles and rebuttals in Korea, Japan, and abroad about the protest. For example, a report in the colonial government–backed English-language The Seoul Press claimed prison conditions were like those of a health resort; Schofield published a rebuttal that ridiculed the claim and described in detail the methods of torture employed by the Japanese. In retaliation for his acts, Japan pressured him into leaving Korea in 1920.

American journalist Valentine S. McClatchy, publisher of The Sacramento Bee, was in Seoul and witnessed Gojong's funeral and much of the early protests. He described Japanese investigators following him and searching his house in an apparent effort to stop him from leaking information about the protests. McClatchy would eventually leave Korea on March 17, but made a point of traveling around the peninsula and documenting what he saw before his departure. Upon his return, he dedicated the front page of the Bee's April 6 issue to the protests, and criticized Japan for manipulating information on the event.

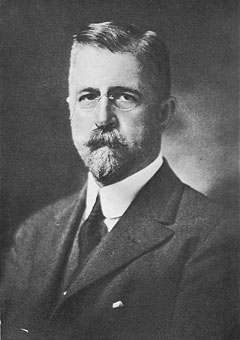
American Korean independence activist Homer Hulbert.

American missionary Homer Hulbert, who had previously served as a personal envoy of the Korean monarch Gojong, published articles and gave speeches on the Korean situation to large audiences in the U.S. On one occasion, he gave a speech to 1,200 people in Ohio. On March 1, 1921, he gave a speech to 1,300 people in New York City. (Note: Palmer argues that much of this audience was likely non-Korean, as there were around 100 Koreans in New York at the time.)

A number of churches argued that Japan should alter its policies in Korea, although they did not openly advocate for Korea's independence. The Commission on Relations with the Orient of the Federal Council of the Churches of Christ conducted a three-month investigation of the protests and published a 125-page report that concured with Korean reporting. The Presbyterian Church in Canada compiled and published a report with its evidence of the protests' suppression. One of its foreign mission board secretaries wrote, "Mails and cables are censored and the World is kept in ignorance whilst Japan is posing as a civilized nation".

=== Rebuttals from the Korean diaspora ===
Korean-American independence activists attempted to sway U.S. public opinion on the protests through writings and speeches. They established the League of Friends of Korea in April, which was dedicated to publicizing the independence movement. The organization would eventually have branches in 19 cities and upwards of 10,000 members. In 1921, Henry Chung published The Case of Korea, a book that criticized Japanese colonialism and advocated for Korean independence. Japan attempted to halt the book's publication. In spite of this, The New York Times published an abridged version of the book, and the entire book was submitted into the American Congressional Record. Chung gave dozens of talks on his book and, according to scholar Brandon Palmer, became a noted figure in American intellectual circles, with significant audiences at his talks. Some of their writings strategically focused on the disproportionate persecution of Korean Christians, which they knew would evoke sympathy from American audiences. They also placed Korea's situation in the context of increasing Japanese colonialism and aggression, particularly that in China.

In Russia, Korean journalists published writings in newspapers such as the Hanin Sinbo about the protests that were quoted by Russian journalists.

According to the analysis of one South Korean journalist, international publications became increasingly skeptical of Japan's narratives as time progressed. According to the analysis of Palmer, Korean public relations efforts continued into the early 1920s. They attempted to push for recognition at the 1921–1922 Washington Naval Conference, but were rebuffed. At the conference, Japan relinquished its holdings in Shandong and agreed to a number of demilitarization and openness policies. Palmer theorizes that these concessions quelled American criticisms of Japan. Palmer argued that the pro-Korea media campaign had some lasting success in influencing American opinion of Japan and Korea. However, the overall American public remained apathetic about Korea, and no significant policy changes occurred as a result of it.

== Japanese reactions and policy changes ==
In Japan and abroad, the movement was widely seen as an embarrassment to the colonial government. Scholar Penny Bailey argues that the majority of Japanese opinions in publications supported the colonial government and Japanese colonialism. Others publicly debated what was dubbed "the Japan–Korea problem" (Japanese: 日鮮問題, romanized: Nissen mondai), and presented a range of opinions on what caused the protests, how serious they were, and how to prevent future unrest.

Public intellectual Sakuzō Yoshino published articles in Japanese and at least one in English, in which he described Japan's colonialism as a noble venture, but condemned the assimilation of and discrimination towards Koreans as causing humanitarian concerns. His writings reportedly attracted criticism from nationalists. Right-wing expansionist group Kokuryūkai, while not advocating for granting Koreans independence, reportedly promoted granting Korea some degree of "domestic self-governance".

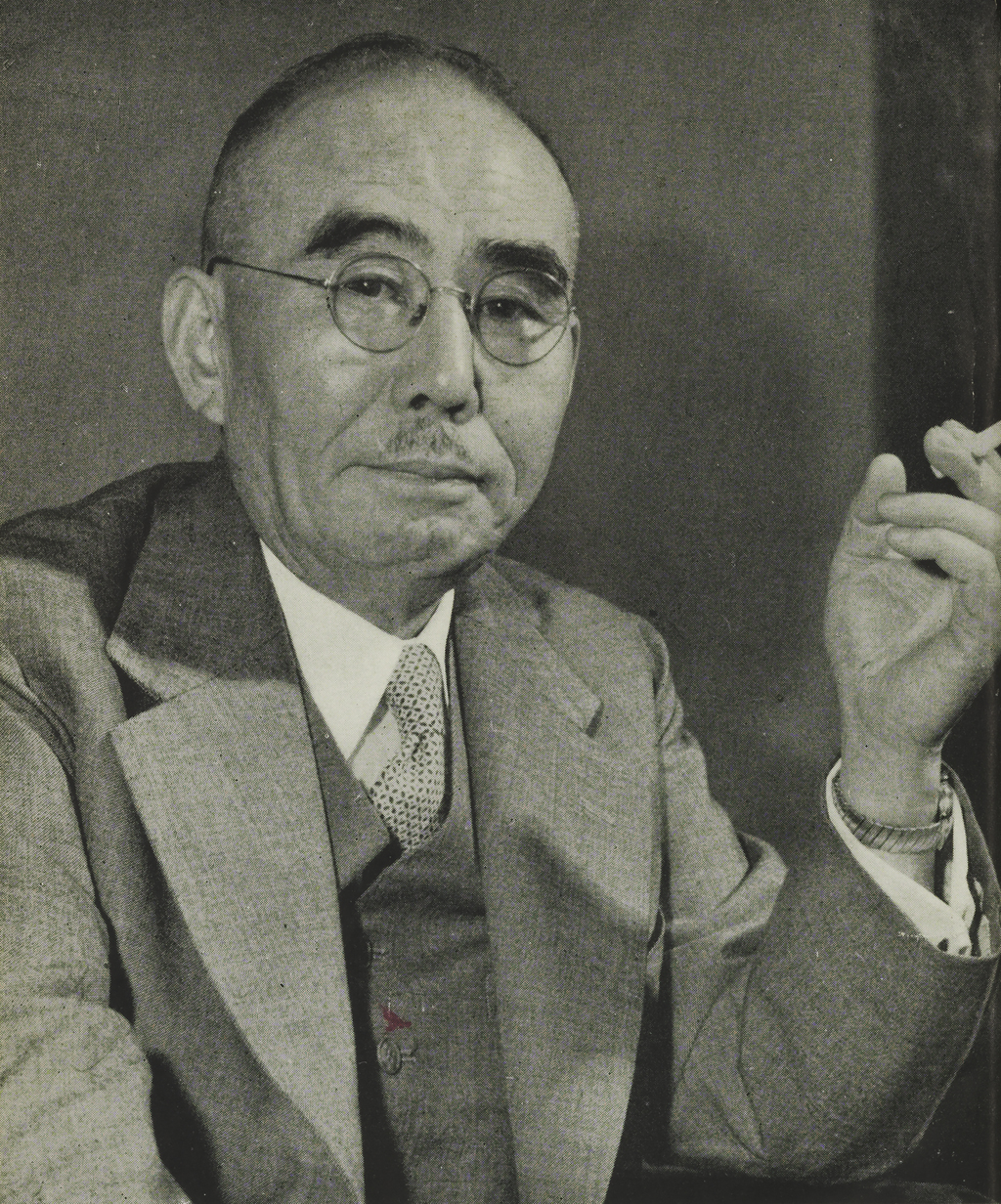
Japanese journalist Tanzan Ishibashi reportedly welcomed the March First Movement.

Some, especially those in the Japanese left wing, criticized the colonial government and argued that the movement began because colonial policies had been too repressive. Journalist Tanzan Ishibashi, as part of his "Small Japan" ideology (小日本主義), reportedly welcomed the movement and saw it as signaling the end of colonial rule in Korea. He reportedly saw it as a part of the global trend of liberalization, and argued that Japan had previously treated Koreans extremely poorly. Japanese Koreanist and art historian Yanagi Sōetsu's sympathy towards Korea reportedly increased after the protests. He became a significant voice in advocating for the protection of Korean art and architecture, although modern Korean nationalists have reportedly criticized his participation in what they view as the colonial government's subsequent superficial cultural appeasement efforts. Yanagi publicly condemned assimilation efforts and was eventually met with censorship.

=== Cultural rule ===
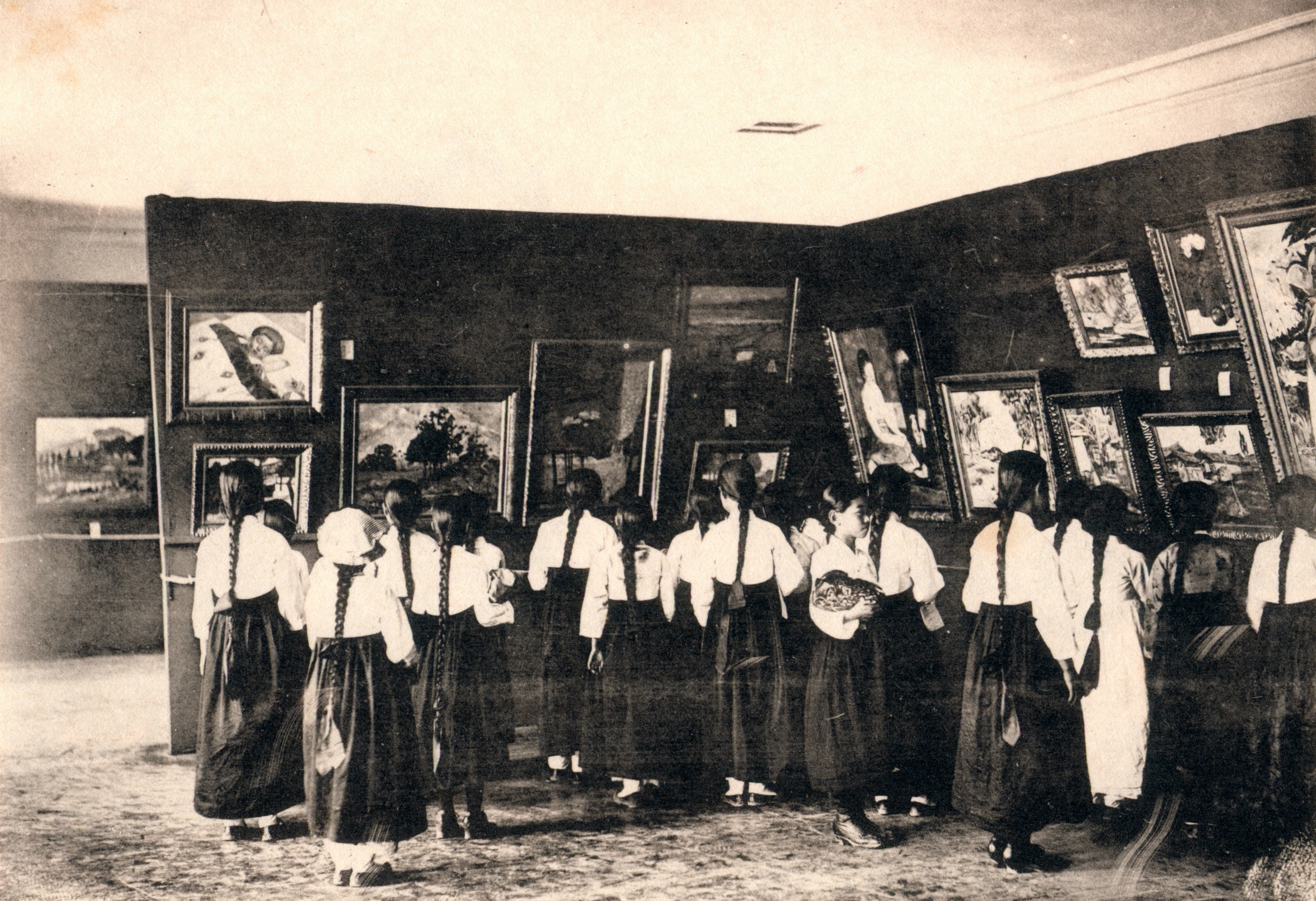
The inaugural Chōsen Art Exhibition, created as a part of the cultural rule policies. (1922)

The colonial government enacted a number of concessions after the protests. Many of these efforts have been grouped under the name "cultural rule" (文化政治, bunka seiji); this was in contrast to the previous era, which has been dubbed "military rule" (武断政治, budan seiji). These policies allowed several limited cultural freedoms and programs for Koreans. This included permission for several Korean newspapers to be founded, which resulted in the creation of the now newspapers of record The Dong-A Ilbo and The Chosun Ilbo, (Note: Previously, from 1915 to early 1920, the only Korean newspaper allowed for publication in Korea was the Maeil Sinbo, which was de facto operated by the colonial government. Previous papers were pressured to close or were banned.) as well as the establishment of institutions like the Chōsen Art Exhibition and the Government-General of Chōsen Library. Access to print materials and the arts significantly expanded. In addition, while the colonial government had previously been more consistently dismissive towards Korean culture, it began conceding that Korea had some unique traditions worthy of protection and development.

A number of commentators have evaluated these policy changes as being largely cosmetic and intended to appease Koreans and international observers. An August 22, 1919 article in American newspaper The Evening Star described one such concession as "merely one of those face-saving diplomatic schemes of Japan".

Historian Michael Shin argues that colonial authority actually expanded during this period. Colonial expenditures doubled from 1919 to 1921, policies encouraged active management of Korean culture instead of passive punishment, and the police presence and intervention in Korea's economy increased. Koreans saw little improvement to their socioeconomic conditions and civil rights as a result of these policies. Throughout the period of cultural rule, Japan continued violently suppressing the Korean independence movement. By the late 1930s, many of these concessions were retracted, and assimilation was enforced with greater intensity.

== International reactions ==
Many governments and media outlets learned of the movement within several weeks of its beginning. No major foreign governments challenged Japan's rule over Korea. This was largely because each government determined that forwarding their policy goals with Japan outweighed offering support to Korea. Journalists and some individual politicians voiced criticism towards Japan's suppression of the protests.

=== United States ===
The U.S. did not take any significant action in favor of Korea as a result of the protests. The scholar Brandon Palmer argued that even if the U.S. did publicly support Korean independence, circumstances still made it unlikely that Korea would be liberated as a result of this. Furthermore, he noted that the U.S. had been engaging in its own colonialism and violently suppressing its own subjects, and that expressing support for Korean independence would have appeared hypocritical.

In April 1919, the U.S. State Department told their ambassador to Japan that "the consulate [in Seoul] should be extremely careful not to encourage any belief that the United States will assist the Korean nationalists in carrying out their plans and that it should not do anything which may cause Japanese authorities to suspect [the] American Government sympathizes with the Korean nationalist movement". Leo A. Bergholz, American consul-general in Seoul, reportedly expressed some sympathy towards the Korean protestors and advocated for colonial reforms, but otherwise adopted a passive stance.

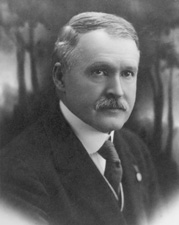
American Senator and Korean independence activist Selden P. Spencer

A small number of individual American politicians expressed sympathy for Korea and the protests. Missouri Senator Selden P. Spencer wrote the foreword for Henry Chung's The Case of Korea. On July 15 and in August, in the context of opposing the ratification of the articles of the League of Nations, Republican senators Miles Poindexter and George W. Norris submitted into the Congressional Record dissents that cited Korea as an example of a nation the organization had failed to aid. Norris also served as vice-president of the League of Friends of Korea. A tabled resolution in support of Korean independence was rejected by the Senate on March 18, 1920. In 1921, Congress condemned the violent suppression of the movement, but affirmed Japan's authority over Korea. The statement claimed that Korea was "as fixedly a part of [Japan] as California, Arizona, and New Mexico are a part of the United States".

Palmer argues that "the overwhelming response of the American public to the plight of Korea was apathy". The movement had occurred in the aftermath of World War I, and American attention was often focused on affairs in Europe. A number of non-politician Americans joined the League of Friends of Korea and expressed support for the Korean independence movement.

The movement did receive coverage in the American press, although often sporadically and not as the main story. A South Korean journalist claims that The New York Times had published an article critical of the Korean independence movement just a month prior to the protest, but shifted to expressing sympathy soon afterwards. On June 15, the paper dedicated the entirety of one of its six pages to coverage of modern Korean history and the protests, with a full reprint of the text of the Korean Declaration of Independence.

=== China ===
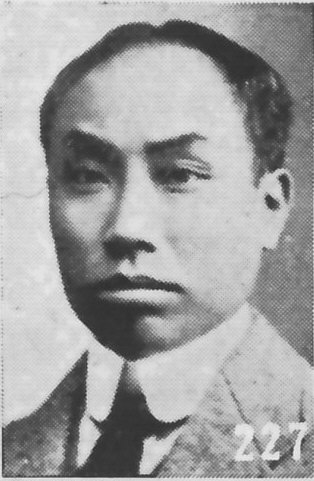
Chen Duxiu praised the March First Movement.

The Chinese government did not openly advocate for Korea's independence, but Chinese politicians and press frequently voiced sympathy and praise for the movement. The prominent newspaper Republic Daily News covered the protests on a daily basis for some time. One of its articles contained the line, "If the [protestor] in front falls, the one behind continues marching forward. [The Koreans] truly do not fear death". Chinese politician Chen Duxiu, in his magazine The Weekly Review (每週評論), praised the protests and advocated for Chinese people to follow the Korean example. Other prominent figures in modern China, including Mao Zedong and Fu Ssu-nien, also voiced their support. Student journalists of Peking University similarly wrote favorably of the protests. These sentiments were echoed by English-language newspapers in China, including the Peking Daily News and Peking and Tientsin Times.

One Yonhap News Agency reporter argued that a letter from an anonymous Korean student to U.S. President Wilson was possibly significant in influencing Chinese public opinion on the protests. Although it is unknown if the U.S. ever received the letter, it was widely republished in Chinese papers and was followed by a shift towards more sympathetic reporting towards Korea.

=== Russia ===
At the time of the movement, Russia was engaged in the Russian Civil War and Russian Revolution. The foreign ministry of the anti-Bolshevik Russian State consulted with Japan in March, then officially took a neutral stance on the protest.

The Bolsheviks frequently expressed solidarity with the Koreans. Several South Korean and American scholars and journalists have since argued that the protesting Koreans were from across the political spectrum, and that Lenin and the Bolsheviks actively sought to link movements such as these with their cause, as they stood to benefit from doing so. After the Soviet Union assumed control over territories with significant Korean populations in the Russian Far East, it allowed and sometimes encouraged Koreans to openly express support for the Korean independence movement.

Due to the civil war, overall awareness of the movement was likely low amongst the general Russian public, although it was still covered in major papers. Reporting on it was also possibly relatively delayed compared to in other countries; a 2019 study on global coverage of the protests claimed that a May 3 article in the leftist newspaper Pravda is the earliest known Russian article on the protests. The article criticized Japan's violent suppression of the protests, as well as the subsequent disinformation campaign.

=== United Kingdom ===
The British media displayed a general lack of interest in the protests, publishing articles on them only weeks after they first began and which were merely reprints of reports sent to Europe by Reuters correspondents in China and Japan. (Note: These reports from Reuters also initially influenced coverage of the movement in the French media, with several French newspaper articles citing them as they described the protests as violent riots.) These articles generally repeated the Japanese government line, describing the protests as violent riots incited by Bolshevik Koreans based out of Shanghai, though The Guardian also reported eyewitness testimonies from Christian missionaries in Korea who claimed that Japanese forces committed atrocities against unarmed protestors. This mostly pro-Japanese coverage of the protests stood in contrast to reporting in China, the United States, Australia and Southeast Asia, which tended to be much more balanced; the Yonhap News Agency speculated that this was due to the Anglo-Japanese Alliance leading the British media to assume an unusually pro-Japanese stance. The Anglican Church of Korea reportedly attempted to maintain a middle ground position between what it viewed as Korean terrorism after the protests and the oppression of the Japanese colonial government. Anglican bishop Mark Trollope advocated for Japan's continued rule in Korea and praised the cultural rule reforms. The church's positions on these issues reportedly alienated potential Korean converts.

In line with their media counterparts, the British government assumed a muted response to the protests, with no member of the Lloyd George ministry advocating for Korean independence. However, parts of the British public became more sympathetic towards Korean independence after the Jeamni massacre on 15 April, with the pro-Korean organisation The Friends of Korea (French: Les Amis de la Corée) being formed in Britain and France. Several senior British officials, including William Royds, William Max Muller and George Curzon, expressed support for the Koreans. Curzon and Beilby Alston pressured the Japanese government to end the violence, with Alston reportedly informing the Japanese authorities that they were "outhunning the Huns" and "outrivalling Germans in war". These officials advocated for Japan to grant Korea varying degrees of self-governance, which came to naught in the face of strong Japanese opposition. During the early 1920s, Labour Party MPs Arthur Hayday and Thomas Walter Grundy repeatedly mentioned Korean opposition to Japanese rule in the House of Commons, requesting the British government to bring it up with their Japanese counterparts. However, none of these efforts resulted in significant changes in Japan's policy towards Korea.

==== British Empire ====
Papers in British Malaya, while still generally in line with reporting in the U.K., shared information about Japan's violent response. One article of The Malaya Tribune argued that Japan would not be able to stop the unrest through violence. A response to a reader question in the April 2 issue of The Straits Times attempted to justify why Korea's sovereignty was not approved for discussion at the Paris Peace Conference. For British India, a 2019 South Korean examination did not find many newspapers articles about the movement. A Yonhap reporter theorized that this was possibly due to India being a British colony at the time. One article entitled "Korean Unrest" was published in The Hindu on March 27, and included synthesized information from Reuters reports. This and another report on April 16 described the movement as a violent armed rebellion. Later coverage of Korean issues in the paper is reportedly infrequent and brief.

=== Other countries ===
The French government, which was then hosting the Paris Peace Conference that Koreans were still petitioning to be represented at, reportedly cautiously monitored the movement's progression. A Yonhap reporter argued that the government was concerned that the movement would inspire similar anti-colonial protests in its own territories. The movement received wide coverage in French newspapers. Left-leaning and anti-colonialist newspapers such as L'Humanité praised the movement. A number of French newspapers published an anecdote about female Korean students in Kaesong singing the French song La Marseillaise, which is often associated with the French Revolution, during the protests.

A Yonhap reporter argued that sentiment in Australia did not match that of the U.K., and claimed that articles often expressed skeptical criticism of Japan's handling of the movement.

Mexican newspapers began publishing on the movement on March 13, and reportedly widely condemned Japan's actions. The Korean community in Mexico launched a fundraising campaign in response to the movement, and sent the raised funds to Korean independence activists in Shanghai. Despite the community living in significant poverty, one estimate claims the Koreans there donated an average of 20% of their income to the independence movement.

Germany reportedly had little coverage of the movement, possibly due to instability after its loss in World War I. The first known mention of the protest appeared in Deutsche Allgemeine Zeitung on March 22, 1919, and consisted of two sentences: "The unrest in Korea has been suppressed. There is peace again". Subsequent coverage was reportedly often short, as much reporting was devoted to domestic issues.

Italy reportedly had limited coverage of the movement, with the first known article being in the Corriere della Sera on August 23. The article described the colonial government's reform efforts, and did not explicitly mention the protests. Several South Korean scholars argued that, as a colonial power itself, Italy was incentivized to not incite anti-colonialist sentiment. In addition, Italy and Japan had signed a number of friendly treaties and agreements around this time.

== Legacy and interpretations ==
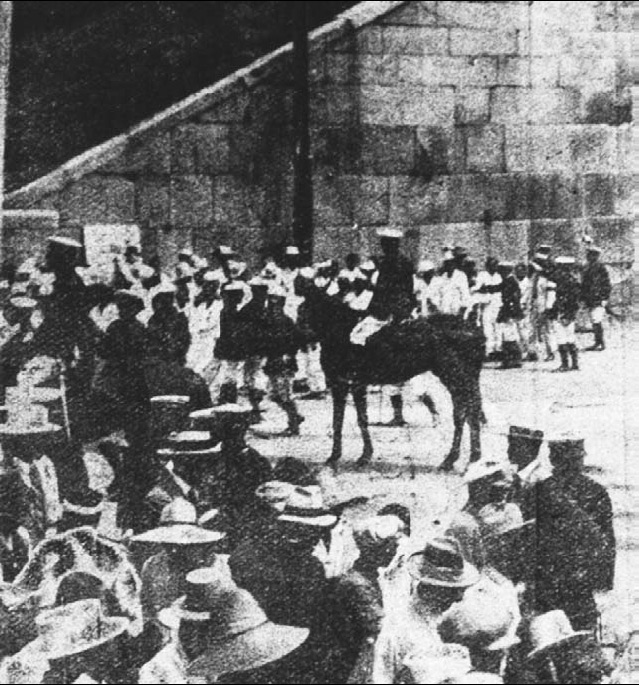
The June Tenth Movement (1926)

The legacy of the March First Movement is still actively debated by scholars. While the movement did not secure Korea's liberation, it had a number of significant effects for Korea and a number of other countries. Independence activist sentiment amongst global Koreans flared. The 1926 June Tenth Movement, which was sparked by the death of Gojong's son Sunjong, had many similar protest actions take place. Amidst the violent repression of the protests and the hunt for its participants and leaders, numerous Koreans fled the peninsula. A number of them congregated in Shanghai, and in April 1919, they founded the Korean Provisional Government (KPG). This government is now considered a predecessor to the modern government of South Korea, and holds an important place in the independence movement and in South Korean identity.

Since the occurrence of the movement, varying groups have interpreted its character and significance in a number of ways. Some left-leaning interpretations analyze the event using Marxist and socialist frameworks, with some reportedly interpreting the movement as a failed proletariat revolution, and something only to be remembered but not celebrated. Since the division of Korea, both the North and South Korean governments have promoted differing analyses of Korean history. The scholar Dennis Hart argues that all nations participate in the curation of national histories in order to influence politics, and that the division and creation of rival states has created the need for two historical narratives from a single past.

Historian Michael Shin views the movement as a turning point for Korean nationalism, from being spearheaded by the elite to popular action. The resulting cultural rule period also led to the proliferation of Korean print media, which in turn further bolstered nationalist sentiment.

=== South Korea ===
In South Korea, the movement is widely considered to be a landmark moment in the formation of the modern Korean national identity.

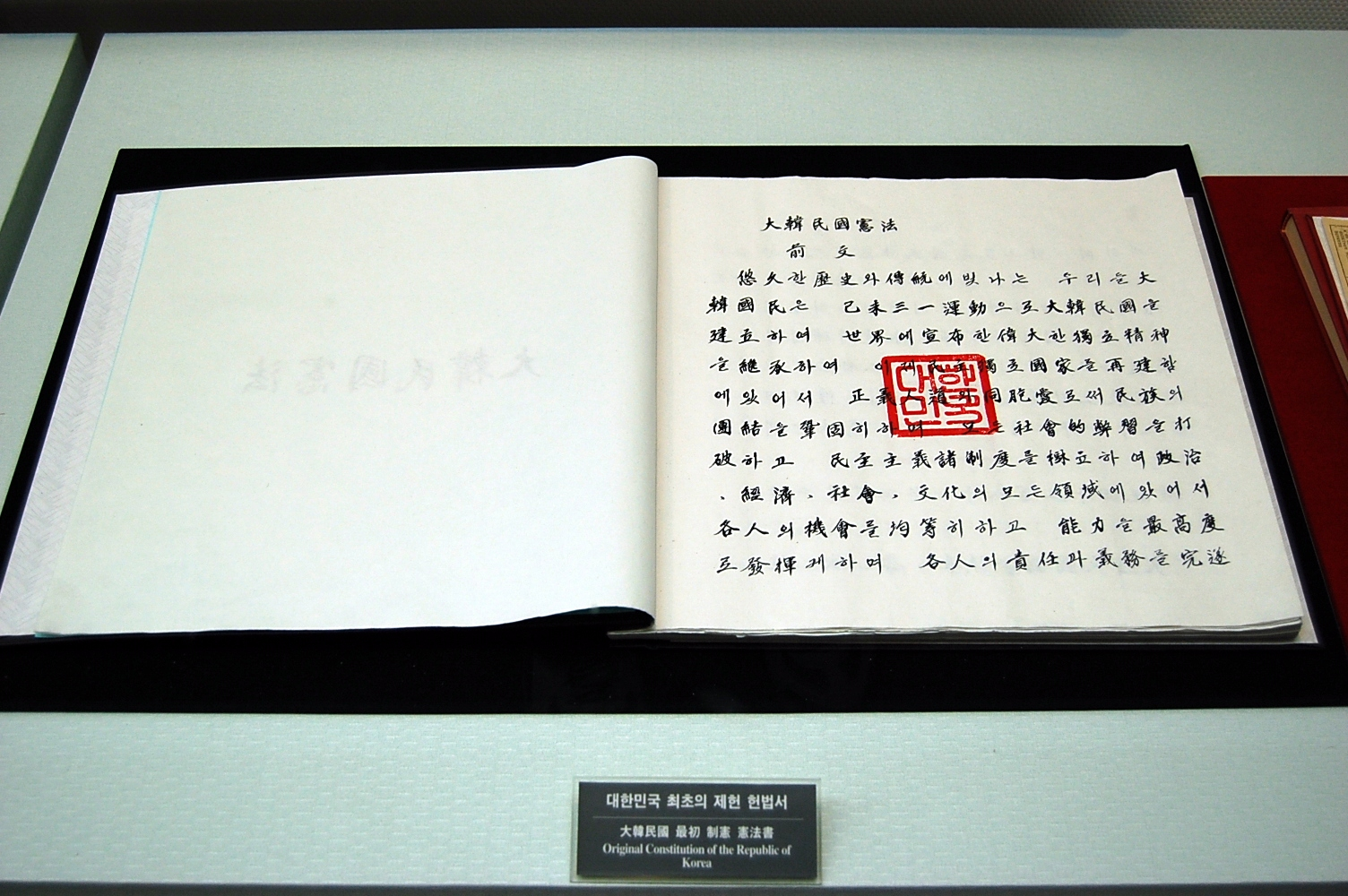
The first page of the constitution of South Korea, with mention of the March First Movement visible.

The constitution of South Korea mentions the movement in its first sentence: "We, the people of Korea, proud of a resplendent history and traditions dating from time immemorial, upholding the cause of the Provisional Republic of Korea Government born of the March First Independence Movement of 1919..."

In South Korea, the event's link to the establishment of the Korean Provisional Government is promoted, so as to bolster that government's legitimacy.

=== North Korea ===
In North Korea, the event is taught as a turning point where the family of eight-year-old Kim Il Sung's took the lead of the independence movement. The epicenter of the movement is taught as being Pyongyang instead of Seoul, and the contributions of figures who became influential in the later South Korean government are downplayed. The thirty-three national representatives are described as having surrendered immediately after reading their declaration. Hart printed this translated excerpt from Chosŏn Ryŏksa, a North Korean history textbook used from 1984 to 1990:

Under the leadership of the great and passionate anti-Japanese revolutionary Kang Jin Sok [the older brother of Kim II Sung's mother], the shout of "Long live Korean independence" spread like a wave throughout the country. From the outset the struggle had the characteristics of a riot and spread. At this time, our great and beloved leader Kim II Sung, who was eight years old, participated in the anti-Japanese demonstration and traveled to Bongťongdae Gate, which was about 30 li away.

While scholars in both the South and North are in relative consensus that the movement was unlikely to result in Korea's prompt liberation, North Korean textbooks reportedly argue that the movement failed because it lacked Kim's central leadership.

=== Other independence movements ===
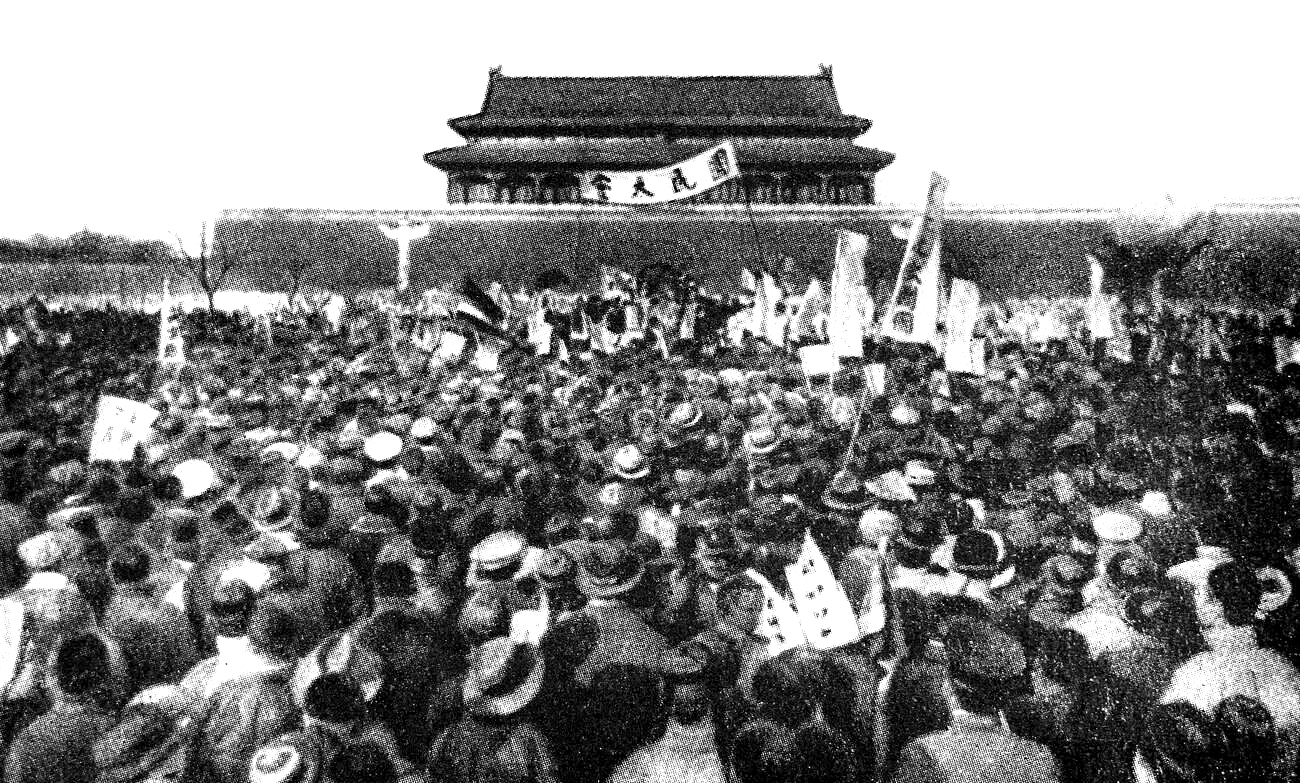
Chinese protestors of the May 4 Movement. The protest's organizers reportedly were in part inspired by the March First Movement. (1919)

The March First Movement had some impact on other protest movements around this time, although the extent of the impact is actively debated. A number of historians have argued that the various protests occurred in differing political circumstances and with different causes, and are thus difficult to directly attribute to the March First Movement.

Several weeks after the March First Movement, organizers of the May Fourth Movement in China such as Fu Ssu-nien cited the March First Movement as one of their inspirations. That protest has since been evaluated as a critical moment in modern Chinese history.

Indian independence activist Mahatma Gandhi read of the peaceful protests while in South Africa. He reportedly decided to return to India soon afterwards and launch the non-cooperation movement.

In the U.S.-occupied Philippines, university students in Manila held a pro-independence protest in June 1919, and cited the March First Movement as inspiration.

In British-occupied Egypt, students of Cairo University held a pro-independence protest amidst the 1919 Egyptian revolution, and cited the March First Movement as an inspiration.

=== The movement as a revolution ===
There is debate over where the movement can be considered a revolution. Historian Youngseo Baik argues that it can be, as the movement advocated for significant political change and has had lasting impact on Korean political thought.

=== Apology ===
In August 2015, Yukio Hatoyama, who had previously served as Prime Minister of Japan for nine months, visited Seodaemun Prison and apologized for how the prisoners had been treated.

== Commemorations ==
=== History and description ===
The March First Movement has been commemorated for each year since its occurrence, in both Korea and amongst the Korean diaspora. Historically, both left- and right-leaning Korean groups have celebrated the occasion. For example, in China in the 1920s, the rivaling right-leaning Korean National Party and left-leaning KNRP made a point of hosting a joint ceremony to bridge their political divide and demonstrate unity to observers.

During the colonial period, independence activists scheduled speeches, rallies, and protests for the day. In Korea and amongst Koreans in Japan and in Manchuria, these events were often hosted in secret. The newspaper The Dong-A Ilbo openly commemorated the day in Korea on a number of occasions and was punished for doing so.

Commemorations typically involve readings of the declaration, speeches, nationalist music, and the displaying of nationalist symbols, particularly the taegeukgi (flag). A number of songs have been written and performed for these meetings, with several attested to in Shanghai and Manchuria in the 1920s. Scholar Choe Seon-ung (최선웅) wrote that for the left-leaning Korean National Revolutionary Party in the 1930s, efforts were made to reduce the number of nationalist symbols in ceremonies, so as to promote proletarian internationalism. Social events, especially dinners (or if funds were insufficient, refreshments), and events such as sports festivals, also accompanied many ceremonies. Koreans are also attested to boarding cars decorated with nationalist symbols and driving around whilst distributing leaflets about the independence movement.

Commemorations have historically been funded by private donations, organization membership fees, and government grants. There are records of Koreans across the economic and social spectrum in Russia, China, the United States, and Cuba donating money for commemoration events.

Choe argues that after the division of Korea, ceremonies reflected the increasing political polarization. In the southern United States Army Military Government in Korea (USAMGIK), right- and left-leaning groups held separate commemorations. Right-leaning groups continued to prominently display nationalist symbols. Ceremonies also came to involve Korean reunification sentiment.

=== South Korea ===
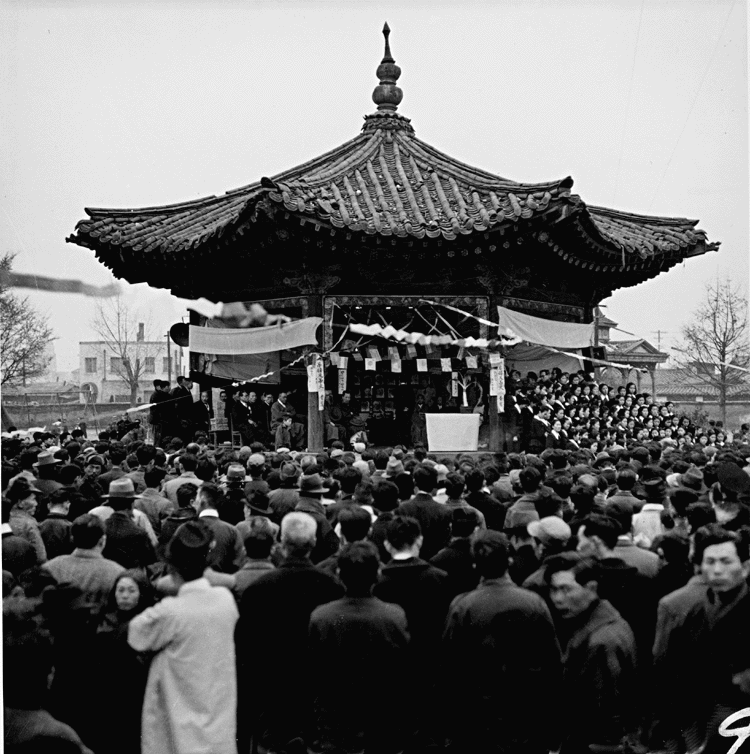
Celebration of the movement held in Tapgol Park in 1954.

In the USAMGIK, March 1 was made a holiday in February 1946. Various events were held in Seoul on that year's anniversary. Early on that day, a left-leaning group held a ceremony at the mountain Namsan. A major celebration was held at the Bosingak pavilion. Present at the event were Syngman Rhee, Kim Ku, and O Se-chang. Absent at the ceremony was Choe Nam-seon, the author of the declaration; in the years succeeding the movement, he had collaborated with the Japanese.

On Jeju Island on March 1, 1947, a rally with 30,000 people in attendance was held in which anti-trusteeship sentiment (opposition of the Allied occupation of Korea) was linked to the spirit of the March First Movement.

On October 1, 1949, South Korea designated March 1 as the national holiday Samiljeol (삼일절), and ceremonies were designated to be organized by the federal and local governments. Each year, a reenactment of the reading of the declaration is held in Tapgol Park. In 1950, South Korea recognized a song about the movement by Jeong In-bo (정인보), one of several written and performed about the movement, as the official song for its commemorations.

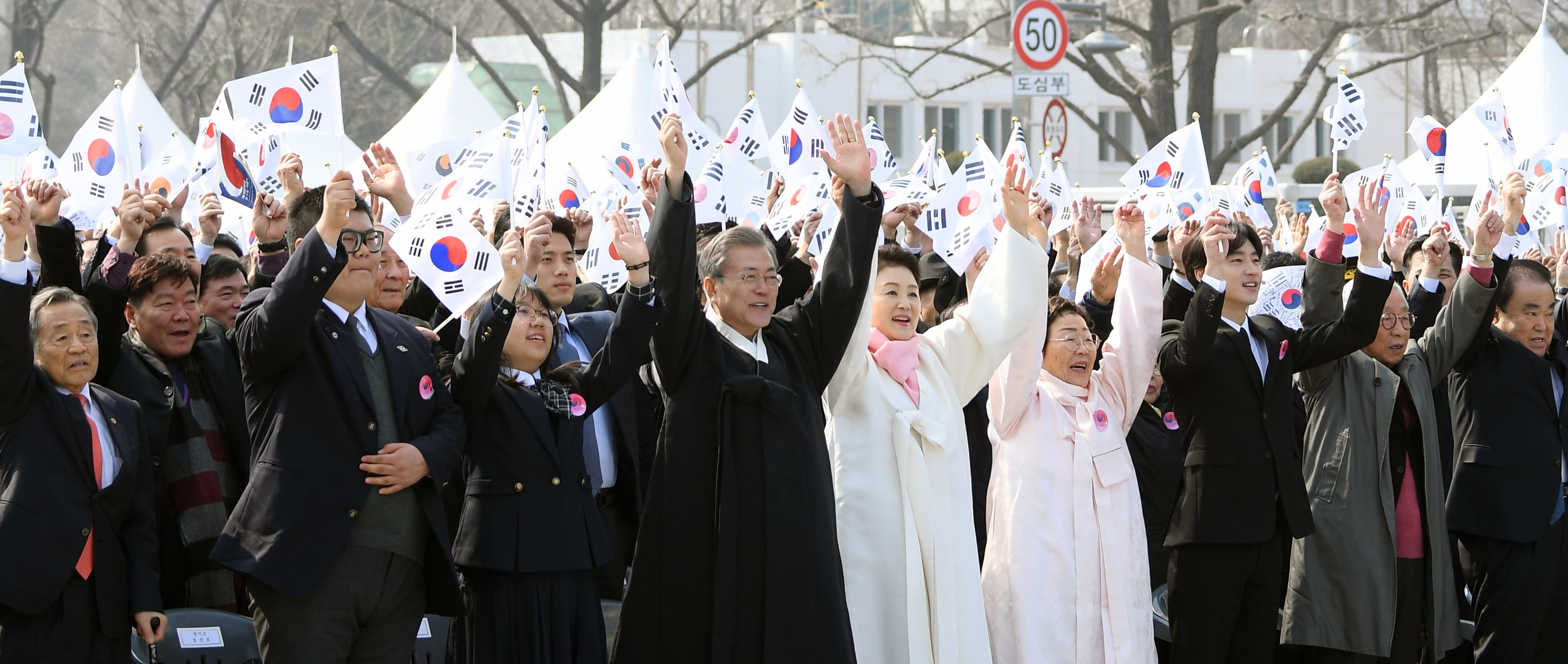
Centennial celebration of the movement, with President Moon in center (2019)

In 2018, President Moon Jae-in's administration established the Commission on the Centennial Anniversary of March 1st Independence Movement and the Korean Provisional Government (KPG) to celebrate these occasions. The KPG was the government-in-exile of Korea during the Japanese occupation, and a predecessor of the current government. North Korea refused to participate in the joint project of the anniversary due to "scheduling issues". The commission ceased its operation in June 2020.

=== North Korea ===
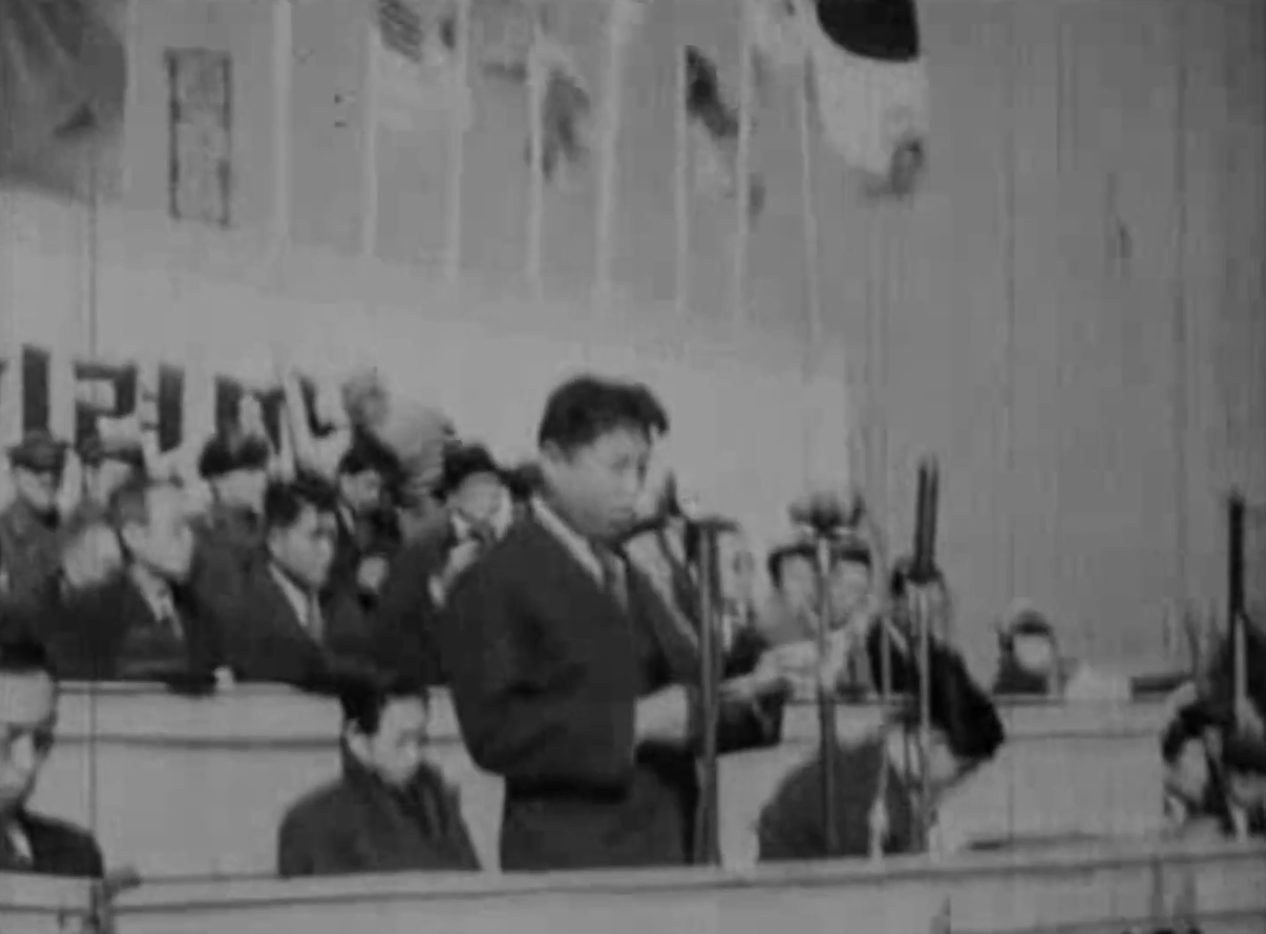
Kim Il Sung speaking at the first public celebration of the March First Movement in northern Korea in 1946. A taegeukgi flag is flying above Kim; both the north and south used the design from 1945 to 1948.

In 1946, the Provisional People's Committee of North Korea made the occasion a national holiday. This later changed; the holiday was renamed to "The People's Anti-Japanese Uprising Memorial Day" (반일인민봉기기념일) and demoted from the status of national holiday. Commemorations are reportedly mostly central, with few local celebrations. The events are geared towards inciting anti-American and anti-Japanese sentiment.

Before the division of Korea, the taegeukgi flag and Aegukga anthem were widely associated with commemorations of the movement, but over time, these disappeared in both North Korean commemorations and historical writings on the movement. Choe theorizes that this is the result of these symbols becoming more associated with right-leaning Koreans over time.

=== Japan ===
Koreans who arrived in Japan before 1945 (called "Zainichi Koreans") and their descendents have commemorated the movement annually. Commemorations were more possible in the countryside than in the cities, as pressure from Japanese authorities was lower there. On a number of occasions, Koreans used unrelated events, such as school concerts and union meetings, as covers for commemoration ceremonies and rallies. Police officers arrived to break up some rallies. On a number of occasions, Koreans held surprise mass demonstrations in the open. In 1921, Korean students held a rally in Hibiya Park in Tokyo. The police were reportedly surprised by its occurrence, and rushed to gather officers in order to disperse it. In 1923, around 300 Korean students approached Ueno Park in order to conduct another rally, but found that Japanese police had already been stationed there in high concentrations. The Koreans reportedly conducted the protest regardless. In 1925, a rally at Tokyo Imperial University led to violent clashes with police, the involvement of the military to suppress the unrest, and ten arrests.

=== Soviet Union ===
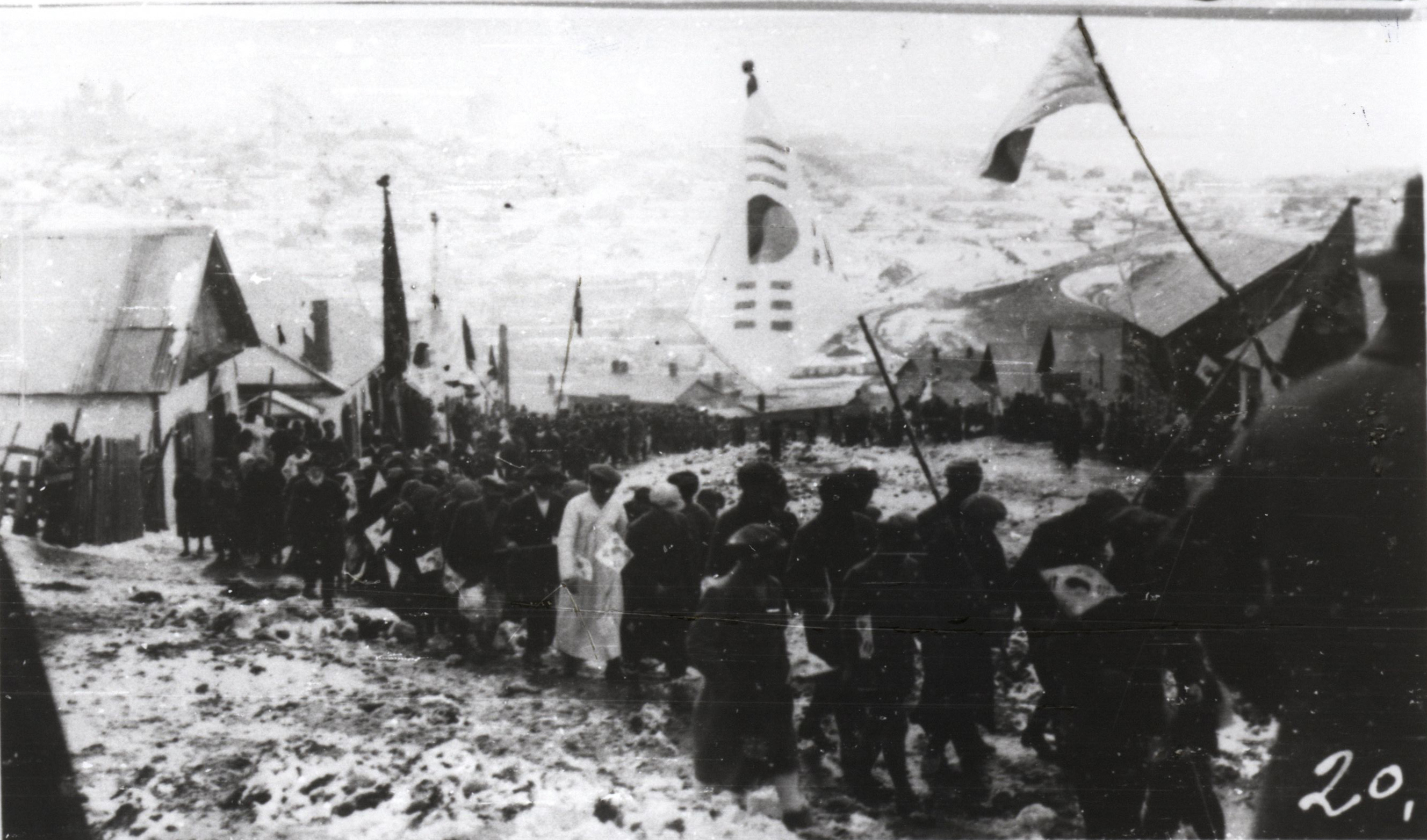
Anniversary marches in Vladivostok (1920)

Commemorations of the movement in the Soviet Union were allowed relative freedom. Koreans marched on streets and gave speeches in public venues. Buildings were also booked for ceremonies and rallies, and plays were performed by Korean theater companies. The Korean enclave Sinhanch'on in Vladivostok commemorated the anniversary of the movement each year from 1920 until its dissolution in 1937.

=== China ===
In Manchuria, as Japanese influence over the region increased, open commemoration of the movement became increasingly met with repression. There, in 1932, an anti-Japanese insurgency arose that was dedicated to the March First Movement. Elsewhere in China, such as in Tianjin, Nanjing, and Hankou, Koreans met and held rallies. Some of these meetings were documented in Japanese intelligence reports. In 1925, Koreans in Tianjin distributed thousands of fliers about the independence movement around the city. In Shanghai, ceremonies were hosted by the Korean Residents Association (교민단) and not necessarily by the Korean Provisional Government, and various Korean organizations in the city were invited. Koreans have been attested to commemorating the day in the streets and in the open in the Shanghai French Concession. Amidst the Second Sino-Japanese War in 1938, Korean members of the Korean National Revolutionary Party are attested to celebrating the day by singing the national anthem.

=== Other regions ===
Korean ethnic enclaves, especially Koreatowns, have hosted annual March First Movement commemorations. In 2024, events were hosted in a range of countries, including Brazil, Mongolia, Kuwait, Taiwan, and the United States.

Korean Mexicans in Mérida have celebrated the anniversary of the movement with public events in recent years. Some celebrations have included reenactments of the reading of the declaration and public marches.

Koreans in Cuba are also attested to holding celebrations.

In the United States, New York state designated March 1 as Yu Gwan-sun Day on February 27, 2024.

== See also ==
- Big suppression operation against South Korea
- Dancheon Forestry Association massacre
- Gando massacre
- Hailan River massacre
- Hainan mass grave
- History of Korea
  - Korean nationalism
  - June 10th Movement
  - Anti-Japanese sentiment in Korea
- Imperial Japanese massacre against Donghak Peasant Movement
- Japanese war crimes
- National Liberation Day of Korea
- Shinhanchon massacre
