= List of newspapers in Korea =

Newspapers before the 1945 division

This list primarily covers newspapers published in Korea before the late August 1945 division of Korea. For the post-division newspapers, see List of newspapers in South Korea or List of newspapers in North Korea. For a prose history, see History of newspapers in Korea. Note that this excludes newspapers published abroad by or for the Korean diaspora. It also excludes other types of publications like magazines and academic journals.

Many of these newspapers are scanned, searchable, and available for free on the Korean Newspaper Archive website.

== List ==
Image	Names (Note: Only put most notable names and spellings in this column. Alternate spellings or previous names can go in notes. English first, then if the paper is primarily Japanese, put Chinese text (Kanji) next, then Hangul. Put Hangul before Chinese (Hanja) if Korean.)	Languages (Note: Ordered by main languages of publishers and prominence in the paper. "Chinese" refers to Classical Chinese (Literary Chinese).)	Year range	Notes	Refs
	Chōsen shinpō 朝鮮新報 조선신보	Japanese; Chinese; Korean	1881–?	Japanese newspaper, first newspaper in Korea.	
	Hansŏng sunbo 한성순보 漢城旬報	Chinese	1883–1884	First Korean newspaper, published by Korean government. Succeeded by Hansŏng chubo.	
	Hansŏng chubo 한성주보 漢城周報	Korean; Chinese	1886–1888	Successor to Hansŏng sunbo. First newspaper primarily in Korean (mixed script).	
	Chōsen shinpō 朝鮮新報 조선신보	Japanese	1890–1908	Unrelated to the 1881 paper. The second-ever Japanese newspaper in Korea, and first in Incheon. Founded as Jinsen Keijō kakushū shōhō, renamed to Chōsen shunpō, then to Chōsen shinpō. Merged with the Chōsen Times and succeeded by the Chōsen shinbun.	
	Chōsen jihō 朝鮮時報 조선시보	Japanese; Korean	1892–1941	Founded as Fuzan shōkyō, renamed to Tokua bōeki shinbun. Merged into Fuzan nippō.	
	Shin chōsenpō 新朝鮮報 신조선보	Japanese	1894–1895	Founded during a hiatus in Incheon's only Japanese newspaper at the time, Chōsen shinpō. Not to be confused with a 1945 Korean newspaper of the same name.	
	Kanjō shinpō 漢城新報 한성신보	Japanese; Korean	1895–1906	Involved in the 1895 assassination of Empress Myeongseong. Merged into Keijō nippō.	
	Tongnip sinmun The Independent 독립신문 獨立新聞	Korean; English	1896–1899	First to print exclusively in Hangul, and first private Korean newspaper.	
	Genzan jiji 元山時事 원산시사	Japanese	1897–? 1903–1906		
	The Korean Christian Advocate 대한그리스도인회보	Korean	1897–1900; 1910–1915	First Christian newspaper in Korea, founded by Methodist missionaries. Founded with a different Korean name (죠선크리스도인회보), changed in 1897. Joined The Christian News in 1905, split back off in 1910 with different Korean title (그리스도회보). Merged back again into the successor paper Kidok sinbo.	
	The Christian News 예수교회보	Korean	1897–1915	Presbyterian publication. Founded with different Korean name (그리스도신문), became nondenominational when The Korean Christian Advocate was merged into it in 1905, Korean name changed (예수교신보) in 1907. Split again (예수교회보) from The Korean Christian Advocate. Merged back again into the successor paper Kidok sinbo.	
	Hyŏpsŏnghoe hoebo 협성회회보 協成會會報	Korean	1898–1898	Succeeded by Maeil sinmun.	
	Kyŏngsŏng sinmun 경성신문 京城新聞	Korean	1898–1898	First Korean commerce newspaper. Merged into the Hwangsŏng sinmun. Not to be confused with the 1907 Japanese newspaper of the same name.	
	Cheguk sinmun 제국신문 帝國新聞	Korean	1898–1910		
	Hwangsŏng sinmun 황성신문 皇城新聞	Korean	1898–1910	Briefly went by Hansŏng sinmun before its closure.	
	Maeil sinmun 매일신문 每日新聞	Korean	1898–1899	Successor to Hyŏpsŏnghoe hoebo. First daily newspaper in Korea.	
	The Korean Repository	English	1899–1899	Normally a monthly journal, published as a weekly newspaper for around four months.	
	Sisa ch'ongbo 시사총보 時事叢報	Korean	1899–1899	Reorganized into the publishing company Kwangmunsa.	
	Sangmuch'ongbo 상무총보 商務總報	Korean	1899–?	Commerce newspaper, published after Maeil sinmun closed and used its facilities. Closure date unknown.	
	Moppo shinpō 목포신보 木浦新報	Japanese	1899–1941	Merged into the Zennan shinpō (全南新報).	
	Tassei jūhō 達成週報 달성주보	Japanese	1901–1901	Closed after four issues.	
	Genzan nippō 群山日報 군산일보	Japanese?	c. 1902–1941	First weekly paper in North Jeolla Province. Founded as Genzan shinpō, changed name and to daily paper in 1908. Merged into the Zenhoku shinpō.	
	Kannan shinpō 韓南新報 한남신보	Japanese	1903–1908	Merged into the Genzan nippō.	
	Taehan ilbo 대한일보 大韓日報	Korean	1904–?	Pro-Japanese Korean-language arm of the Incheon-based Chōsen shinpō.	
	Daitō shinpō 大東新報 대동신보	Japanese; Korean	1904–1906	Merged into Keijō nippō.	
	The Korea Daily News; Taehan maeil sinbo 대한매일신보 大韓每日申報	English; Korean	1904–1910	Two concurrent Korean versions: mixed script and Hangul. Succeeded by Maeil sinbo, then by Seoul Shinmun.	
	Chōsen mainichi shinbun 朝鮮每日新聞 조선매일신문	Japanese	1904?		
	Chōsen nichi nichi shinbun 朝鮮日日新聞 조선일일신문	Japanese	1904–?	Previously the Jinsen shōbō (仁川商報; 인천상보).	
	Zenhoku shinpō 全北新報 전북신보	Japanese; Korean	1904–1912	Distinct from a 1941 publication of the same name.	
	Zenhoku nippō 全北日報 전북일보	Japanese	1904–1941	First newspaper in Jeonju. Founded as Zenshū shinpō, changed name to Zenhoku nichi nichi shinbun. Merged into Zenhoku shinpō.	
	Chōsen 朝鮮 조선	Japanese	1905–?		
	Masan jihō 馬山時報 마산시보	Japanese	1905–1906	First newspaper in Masan.	
	Fuzan nippō 釜山日報 부산일보	Japanese	1905–1945	Previous names Chōsen nippō and Chōsen jiji shinpō. Seized upon the arrival of the United States occupation force and reorganized into Busan Ilbo.	
	The Seoul Press	English	1905–1937	Purchased by Japanese resident-general and converted into de facto Japanese colonial government publication. Sole daily English-language publication in Korea during colonial period.	
	Heijō shinpō 平壌新報 평양신보	Japanese; Korean	1905–1908	Acquired by Heijō jitsugyō shinpō and renamed to Heijō nippō.	
	Chungang sinbo 중앙신보 中央新報	Korean	1906–1906	Pro-Japanese Korean-language newspaper owned by a Japanese person.	
	Nanpo shinbun 南浦新聞 남포신문	Japanese	1906–1907	Founded as Shinbun chinnanpo (新聞鎭南浦). Merged into Chinnanpo shinpō (鎮南浦新報).	
	Taikyū nichi nichi shinbun 大邱日日新聞 대구일일신문	Japanese	1906–1908	Not to be confused with c. 1940 paper of the same name. Initially founded as the Taikyū jitsugyō shinpō. Changed names to Taikyū shinpō, then Taikyū nichi nichi shinbun. After a conflict, a separate newspaper called Taikyū shinpō was founded, and then they merged into Taikyū jihō (later Chōsen minpō).	
	Kungmin sinbo 국민신보 國民新報	Korean	1906–1910	Pro-Japanese paper published by Iljinhoe.	
	Mansebo 만세보 萬歲報	Korean	1906–1907	Affiliated with Cheondoism.	
	Nanpo nippō 南浦日報 남포일보	Japanese	1906–1907	Merged into Chinnanpo shinpō (鎮南浦新報).	
	Keijō nippō 京城日報 경성일보	Japanese	1906–1945	Merged from around seven newspapers. De facto Japanese colonial government publication, the most significant newspaper in colonial Korea.	
	Kitakan jitsugyō shinpō 北韓実業新報 북한실업신보	Japanese	1906–1907	Merged into the Genzan nippō.	
	Kyŏnghyang sinmun 경향신문 京鄕新聞	Korean	1906–1910	Catholic. Restarted in 1946 as Kyunghyang Shinmun.	
	Heijō jitsugyō shinpō 平壌実業新報 북한실업신보	Japanese	1906–?		
	Mankan shinpō 滿韓新報 만한신보	Japanese	1906–?	Changed names to Shingishū jihō in 1908, then to Ōkō nippō (鴨江日報) in 1910.	
	Taikyū nippō 大邱日報 대구일보	Japanese	1906–?	Forced to close after it published a critical piece about Itō Hirobumi.	
	Masan shinpō 馬山新報 마산신보	Japanese	1906–?	Closed in 1908, reestablished, but closed again. Sold to the Keijō nippō. Paper reopened in 1911 as Nansen nippō.	
	Chōsen times 朝鮮タイムス 조선타임즈	Japanese	1907–1908	Merged into Chōsen shinbun.	
	Heian nippō 平安日報 평안일보	Japanese	1907–1908	Based in Sinuiju.	
	Keijō shinpō 京城新報 경성신보	Japanese	1907–1912	Briefly went by Keijō shinbun in 1908 before returning to original name.	
	Fuzan nichi nichi shinbun 釜山日日新聞 부산일일신문	Japanese	1907–?	Closed shortly after founding.	
	Genzan jiji shinpō 元山時事新報 원산시사신보	Japanese	1907–1907	Merged into the Genzan nippō.	
	Kitakan shin nippon 北關新日本 북관신일본	Japanese	1907–?	Closed shortly after founding.	
	Taehan sinmun 대한신문 大韓新聞	Korean	1907–1910	Pro-Japanese newspaper. Briefly renamed Hanyang sinmun before being merged into Maeil sinbo.	
	Chōsen minpō 朝鮮民報 조선민보	Japanese	1908–c. 1940	Merged from Taikyū nichi nichi shinbun and Taikyū shinpō. Earlier names Taikyū jihō and Taikyū shinbun. Merged with other local papers into the Taikyū nichi nichi shinbun.	
	Kankō shinpō 咸興新報 함흥신보	Japanese	1908–?	Closed shortly after founding.	
	Minyū shinbun 民友新聞 민우신문	Japanese	1908–?		
	Chōsen shinbun 朝鮮新聞 조선신문	Japanese	1908–1942	Merged from the Incheon-based Chōsen shinpō and Chōsen Times. Merged into the Keijō nippō.	
	Taehan minbo 대한민보 大韓民報	Korean	1909–1910		
	Taedong ilbo 대동일보 大同日報	Korean	1909–1910	Pro-Japanese publication.	
	Heijō shinbun 平壌新聞 평양신문	Japanese; Korean	1909–?		
	Hansŏng sinbo 한성신보 漢城新報	Korean	1909–1909	Pro-Japanese Korean-language publication owned by a Japanese person. Unrelated to the 1895 Japanese publication of the same name.	
	Chūsen nippō 中鮮日報 중선일보	Japanese	1909–1945	First newspaper in Daejeon. First named Ōta shinbun, then Sannan shinpō in 1910, acquired by Keijō nippō in 1912 and renamed to Konan nippō. Became independent in 1918. Renamed to Chōsen chuō shinbun in 1932, then renamed to Chūsen nippō in 1936. Seized upon the liberation of Korea.	
	Gyeongnam Ilbo 경남일보 慶南日報	Korean	1909–1915; 1946–1980; 1989–	First regional Korean-language newspaper, and first in Jinju. Restarted twice, and still publishes today.	
	Shisa sinmun 시사신문 時事新聞	Korean	1910–1910; 1919–1921	Pro-Japanese publication.	
	Keijō shinbun 京城新聞 경성신문	Japanese; Korean	1910–?	Distinct from the 1907 Keijō shinpō, which briefly went by the same name	
	Taehan ilil sinmun 대한일일신문 大韓日日新聞	Korean	1910–1910?	Pro-Japanese Korean-language publication owned by a Japanese person. Same owner as Hansŏng sinbo. Closed after the annexation of Korea.	
	Maeil sinbo 매일신보 每日申報, later 每日新報	Korean	1910–1945	Pro-Japanese successor to The Korea Daily News, subordinated to the Keijō nippō until 1937. Succeeded by the modern Seoul Shinmun.	
	Nansen nippō 南鮮日報 남선일보	Japanese	1911–1941	Successor to Masan shinpō. Merged into the Fuzan nippō.	
	Chōsen jitsugyō shinpō 朝鮮実業新報 조선실업신보	Japanese	1911?–		
	Kidok sinbo The Christian Messenger 기독신보 基督新報	Korean	1915–1937	Successor to The Christian News and The Korean Christian Advocate.	
	Sungdae sibo 숭대시보 崇大時報	Korean	1919–1938	First college newspaper in Korea. Affiliated with Soongsil University. Restarted in 1956.	
	Chosŏn tongnip sinmun 조선독립신문 朝鮮獨立新聞	Korean	1919–1920?		
	The Chosun Ilbo 조선일보 朝鮮日報	Korean	1920–		
	The Dong-A Ilbo 동아일보 東亞日報	Korean	1920–		
	Sidae ilbo 시대일보 時代日報	Korean	1924–1926		
	Chungoe ilbo 중외일보 中外日報	Korean	1926–1931		
	Chosŏn chungang ilbo 조선중앙일보 朝鮮中央日報	Korean	1931–1937	Previously named Jungang Ilbo.	
	Koryŏ sibo 고려시보 高麗時報	Korean	1933–1941		
	Pulgyo sibo 불교시보 佛敎時報	Korean	1935–1944		
	Keinichi shōkokumin shinbun 경일소국민신문 京日少國民新聞	Japanese	1938–1945	Children's newspaper published by the Keijō nippō. Founded as Keinichi shōgakkōsei Shinbun, renamed in 1942.	
	Kidok sinmun 기독신문 基督新聞	Korean; Japanese?	1938–1942	Founded by Korean Christians. Discontinued by order of the Japanese colonial government.	
	Kokumin shinpō 國民新報 국민신보	Japanese	1939–1942	Japanese-language youth newspaper published by the Maeil sinbo.	
	Zenhoku shinpō 全北新報 전북신보	Japanese; Korean?	1941–1945	Merged from around three newspapers. After liberation, succeeded by a series of newspapers, ending with the contemporary Jeon Buk Il Bo.	
	Kōmin nippō 皇民日報 황민일보	Japanese	1942–1942		
