= Chōsen shinpō (Incheon) =

1890–1908 Japanese newspaper in Korea

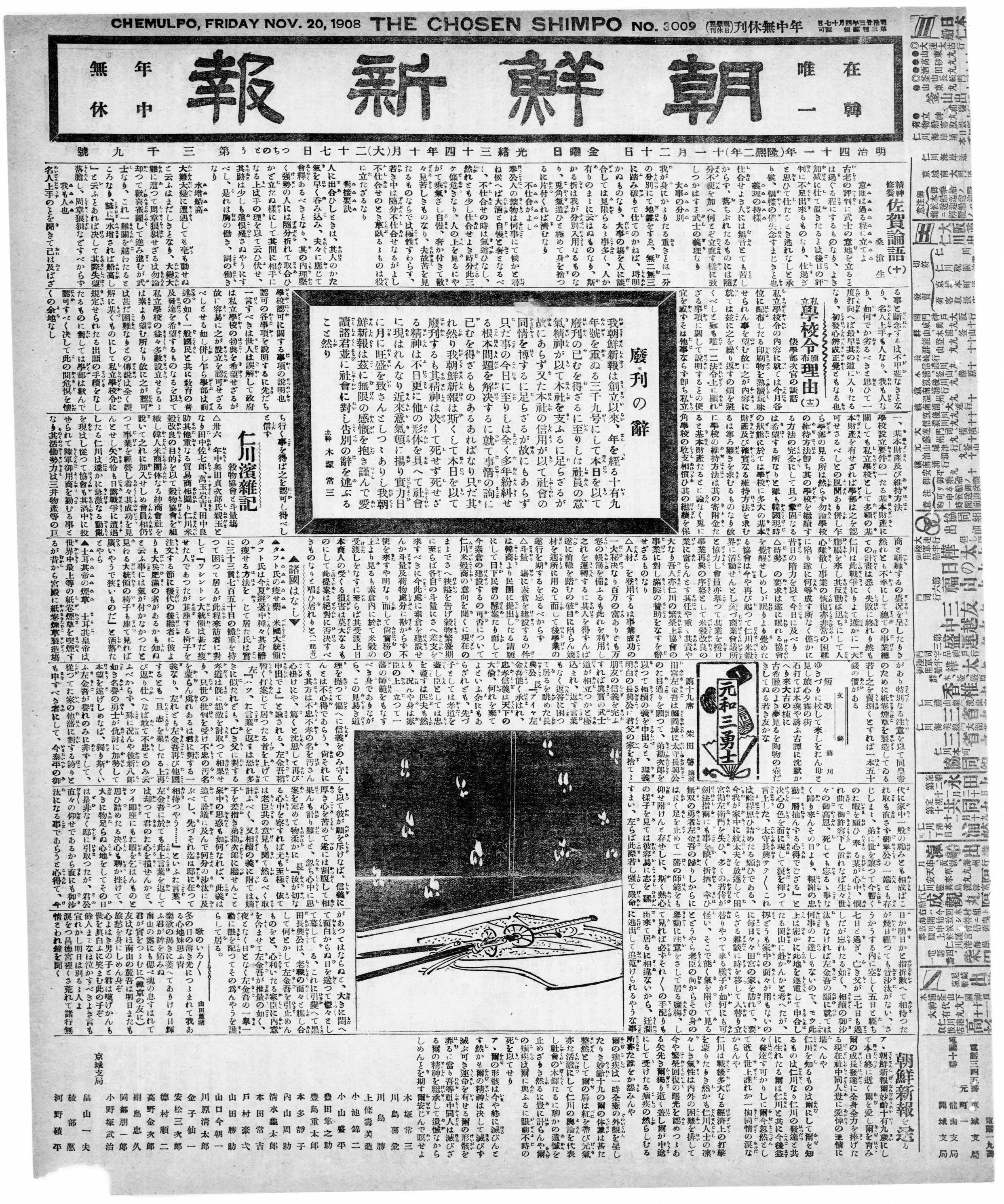
- Founded: 1890
- Language: Japanese
- Ceased publication: November 1908
- City: Incheon (Jinsen)
- Country: Joseon, Korean Empire

The Chōsen shinpō (朝鮮新報; Korean: 조선신보; lit. Korea Newspaper) was a Japanese-language newspaper published in Korea from 1890 to 1908. It was first published as Jinsen Keijō kakushū shōhō (仁川京城隔週商報; 인천경성격주상보), then changed its name to Chōsen shunpō (朝鮮旬報; 조선주보) in 1891. It received its final name in 1892. In 1908, it was merged with the Chōsen Times into the Chōsen shinbun.

It was the second Japanese newspaper to be published in Korea, after the unrelated 1881 Chōsen shinpō.

== Background ==
Joseon's policy of isolationism was forcefully ended by Japan in 1876, with the Ganghwa Island incident and subsequent unequal Japan–Korea Treaty of 1876. While the treaty initially only gave Japan access to Busan, over time Japanese settlers began arriving in greater numbers throughout the peninsula. While there were no Japanese people in the Korean port Incheon in 1880, the population increased to around 1,554 by 1890, and 4,418 by 1895.

== History ==
The Jinsen Keijō kakushū shōhō was founded in 1890 for the growing Japanese population in Incheon. It was published by an offshoot of the company Sumono Shōbōsha (濟物商報社), and primarily focused on economic news.

The exact date of the newspaper's founding is uncertain, with various third-party sources citing years ranging between 1888 and 1890. However, scholars assume the year 1890 based on the testimony of Aoyama Yoshie (靑山互惠), who ran the paper at latest by 1894 and was prominent in Incheon around this time.

The paper stopped publishing after its 48th issue in August 1891, and went on hiatus. The following month, the newspaper restarted as Chōsen shunpō. However, it closed again after its 22nd issue in April 1892, and reorganized as Chōsen shinpō. It again went under hiatus in 1894 due to the rise of the 1894–1895 First Sino-Japanese War, along with several other Japanese newspapers like the Chōsen jihō, possibly due to Japanese restrictions on Japanese-language press publishing about the war. For example, its July 23, 1894 issue was prohibited from being published by Japan.

After the war, Aoyama restarted the newspaper on October 25, 1895. He increased the paper's publication frequency from around three times per month to once every other day. Aoyama died, and from March 1897 Nakamura Tadayoshi (中村忠吉) took over.

The newspaper's finances were tight initially, but it became more stable after the Japanese consulate began providing a stipend of 50 won per month beginning in April 1897. Its total stipend for 1898 was 600 won, and it had a surplus of funds of 306 won.

With its financial stability, the paper began making plans to expand. In 1897, it began work on creating a Korean-language edition in order to attract Korean subscribers. In 1901, it increased the size of its sheets and worked on trying to establish Korean- and English-language editions. In 1902, it became a daily paper, and established a Seoul office. On March 10, 1904, it established a Korean-language edition in Incheon, entitled Taehan ilbo (대한일보; 大韩日報; Daikan Nippō). In December, that edition was moved to Seoul, and countered narratives promoted in native Korean newspapers.

In November 1908, it merged with the Chōsen Times into the Chōsen shinbun.

== See also ==
- List of newspapers in Korea – list of pre-1945 newspapers, including Japanese
- History of newspapers in Korea – prose history of newspapers in Korea
