= Fuzan nippō =

1905–1945 Japanese newspaper in Korea

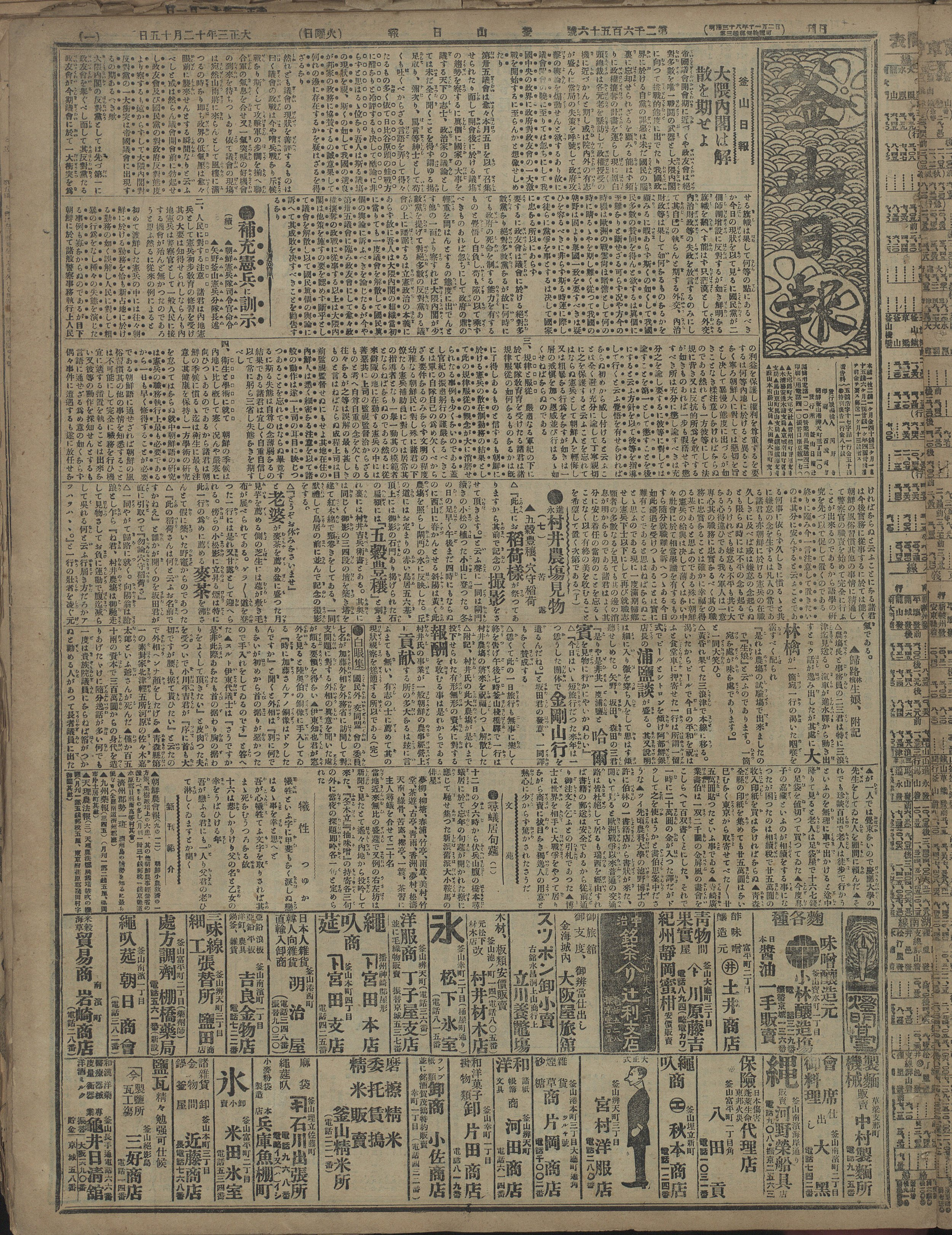
- The cover of the December 15, 1914 edition
- Founder(s): Kuzuu Shusuke
- Founded: February 1905
- Language: Japanese
- Ceased publication: September 1945
- City: Busan
- Country: Korea, Empire of Japan

Fuzan nippō (釜山日報; Korean: 부산일보; RR: Busan Ilbo; MR: Pusan Ilbo) was a Japanese-language newspaper published in Busan, Korea from 1905 to 1945. It previously went by the names Chōsen nippō (朝鮮日報; 조선일보; different from the modern Chosun Ilbo) and Chōsen jiji shinpō (朝鮮時事新報; 조선시사신보).

It was one of the most prominent Japanese newspapers in Korea during the Japanese colonial period, alongside the Keijō nippō and Chōsen shinbun. Upon the 1945 liberation of Korea, the newspaper's assets were seized by the United States and repurposed into the modern Busan Ilbo.

Digital copies are available, scanned and searchable, on the Korean Newspaper Archive. Many original copies of the newspaper from 1914 to 1944 are now stored in the Busan Simin Municipal Library, although some show signs of fire damage.

== History ==
The newspaper was founded by Kuzuu Shusuke (葛生修吉) in February 1905, in what is now Gwangbok-dong, Busan. It was first published under the name Chōsen nippō. In November 1905, it changed its name to Chōsen jiji shinpō, and then finally to Fuzan nippō in October 1907.

It was first published with four pages, and increased this to eight in 1917. It began publishing both in the morning and evenings on January 15, 1923, with four pages in each issue. Notably, it adopted this twice-daily printing system before other private Korean newspapers of the time, and possibly influenced their later adoption of it. In 1929, they increased this to six pages in the morning and four in the evening. In November 1934, this increased to twelve pages total per day.

By the time the newspaper received its final name, its president was Akutagawa Tadashi (芥川正). The paper was then owned by the Akutagawa family, and run as a family business. In 1915, it had 40,000 yen in capital. On November 26, 1915, a fire broke out in a company building, which necessitated the rebuilding of its printing and office facilities. It acquired a rotary printing press in July 1916. By February 1917, it was back to printing eight pages a day, and charged subscribers 50 sen per month.

In 1919, the company was made into a public stock company. It had capital of 250,000 yen, and in April 1920 completed a new office building at what is now Jungang-dong. Around this time, Akutagawa's elder son Tadashi became president, although he died early on January 6, 1928, from disease. Afterwards, Kashii Kentaro (香椎源太郎) became president until his resignation in February 1932, and replacement by Tadashi's son Hiroshi. On January 27, 1931, a fire destroyed their building. They moved into a temporary building and continued publishing two-page issues at a time. Meanwhile, they reorganized the company and hired a new editor in chief.

=== Success ===
The paper performed significantly well, and for years was considered to be second in Korea only to the government-backed Keijō nippō. It earned the second-highest advertising revenues (after the Maeil sinbo) in Korea, and significantly outperformed its Korean-owned rivals: The Dong-A Ilbo and The Chosun Ilbo.

In its early years, the newspaper underperformed its longtime rival Chōsen jihō, which was also based in Busan and predated it by around a decade. However, the Fuzan Nippō began to outperform its rival. While it published more and more pages over time, the Chōsen jihō reduced the number of pages it published from six to four in 1933. On May 27, 1941, after experiencing two fires and by an order of the Japanese colonial governor for there to only be one paper per province, the Chōsen jihō was absorbed into the Fuzan nippō. The Nansen nippō was also merged into the paper in this year. Afterwards, they reduced the number of pages to four in the evenings and two in the mornings.

From 1941 until its end, it had a monopoly on publishing in Busan. However, as a result of the industry consolidation in the 1940s, the Maeil sinbo took significant market share in Korea. Still, the paper was consistently in the top 20 newspapers in both Korea and Japan until its end.

After the 1945 liberation of Korea, the newspaper was seized by the United States Army Military Government in Korea. It was then converted into the modern Busan Ilbo. The newspaper's Korean employees created a separate paper, Minju Jungbo, which continued to operate until 1949.

== Content ==
The paper devoted much of its space to information about business and economics. This was particularly salient, as Busan was a significant port and trading city. Data about fishing, agriculture, shipping were published. It published analyses on technology and the impact of policy on business.

Like the Chōsen jihō, it split its editorial team into "hard" (硬派) and "soft" (軟派) reporters. The former would work on important stories, while the latter would work on supplementary stories.

Its editorials were nationalistic, and faithful to Japanese Governor-General of Chōsen lines. According to a writer for the Korean Newspaper Archive (KNA), in some instances the paper faced backlash from Koreans who disagreed with the content of the editorials. One of the paper's presidents, Akutagawa, was a devout Buddhist, and had around 300 articles about the religion published in the paper. The writer for the KNA claimed that the articles about Buddhism sometimes targeted people who didn't align with their perception of Buddhist religious values. The articles also advocated for the further assimilation of Koreans into the Empire of Japan.

The paper also published Japanese literature. The writer for the KNA claimed that while popular literature was also covered, the majority of stories were about heroism, for example the exploits of samurai. Stories from rakugo, kabuki, and other mediums were adapted for publication.

== See also ==
- List of newspapers in Korea
- History of newspapers in Korea
- Category:Japanese-language newspapers published in Korea
