= Hansŏng chubo =

1886–1888 Korean-language newspaper

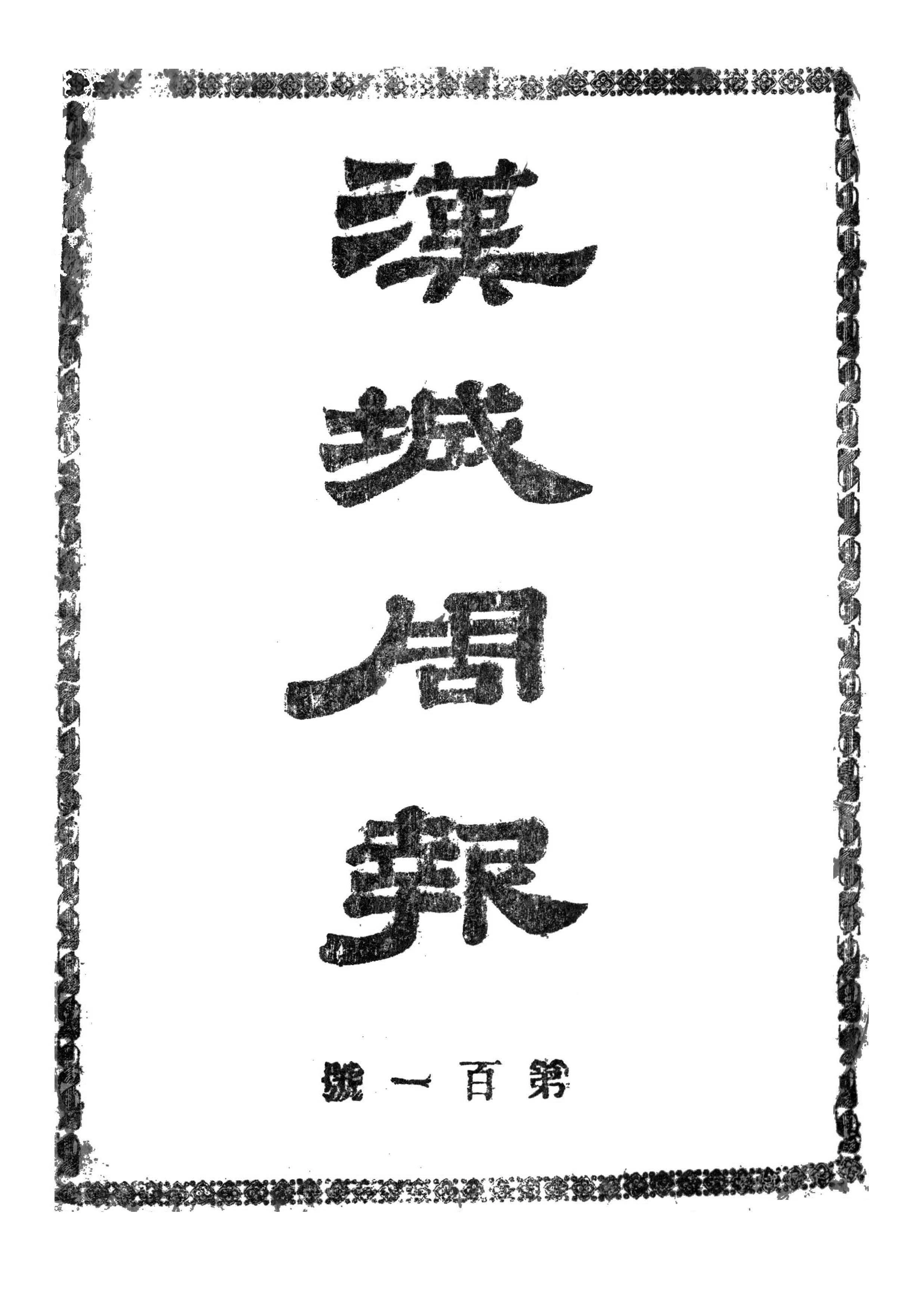
- Cover of the 100th issue (February 6, 1888)
- Founder(s): Kim Yunsik
- Founded: January 25, 1886
- Ceased publication: July 7, 1888
- Country: Joseon

Hansŏng chubo (Korean: 한성주보; Hanja: 漢城周報) was a weekly Korean-language newspaper published from 1886 to 1888. It was the successor paper to the first native Korean newspaper Hansŏng sunbo, and like its predecessor was published by the Korean government. It was the first weekly newspaper to be published in Korea, and the first to publish mostly in Korean script (mostly mixed script).

== History ==
The newspaper was the successor to the 1883–1884 Hansŏng sunbo, whose facilities were burnt down during the failed Gapsin Coup in December 1884. After the chaos in the wake of the coup settled, many in the government agreed that another newspaper was needed. Accordingly, on May 12, 1885, the Korean monarch Gojong assigned politician Kim Yunsik to oversee its creation. Initially, the private printing company Gwanginsa, which had been founded in March, was assigned to create the newspaper. However, on June 12, it was decided that the company wouldn't be able to handle the publication, and that the government should acquire its own printing presses instead. Printing presses and type were acquired from Japan. Japanese journalist and consultant Inoue Kakugorō, who had previously worked on the Hansŏng sunbo and fled to Japan during the Gapsin Coup, returned to Korea to assist in the paper's restarting. They rehired their former staff, and hired 6 more people, and later 3 more after the paper began publication.

The newspaper began publication on January 25, 1886.

The newspaper was printed on Korean paper (hanji). It had 16 lines on each page, with 40 characters per line. Each issue contained 16 or 18 pages. It was 16.5 cm × 22.5 cm (6.5 in × 8.9 in). Unlike its predecessor, which published only in Classical Chinese, the Hansŏng chubo published primarily in Korean mixed script. This was perhaps done to increase its general appeal and adoption by the public. Further along these lines, they made more effort to attract private subscribers from a variety of industries, including agriculture, industry, and commerce.

The Korean government ran into financial difficultes by 1888, and could no longer support the publication of the paper. On July 7, 1888, the newspaper's publication was stopped.

== See also ==
- List of the oldest newspapers
- List of newspapers in Korea
- History of newspapers in Korea
