= Chōsen shinbun =

1908–1942 Japanese newspaper in Korea

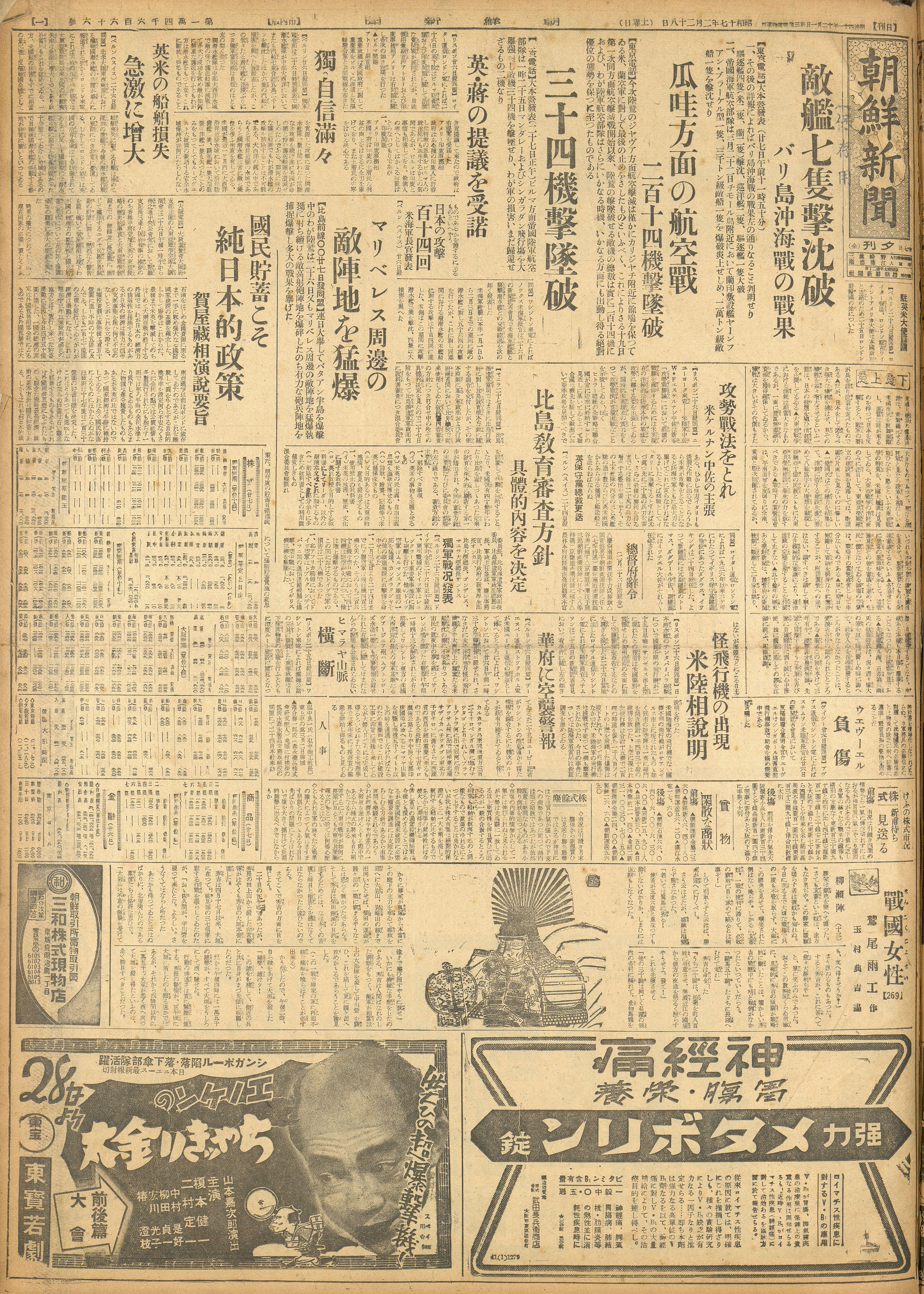
- Front page of the February 28, 1942 edition
- Founder: Kazuo Hagitani
- Founded: December 1, 1908
- Ceased publication: February 1942
- Language: Japanese
- City: Incheon (1908–1919); Seoul (1919–1942)
- Country: Korea, Empire of Japan

Chōsen shinbun (朝鮮新聞; Korean: 조선신문; MR: Chosŏn Sinmun) was a Japanese-language daily newspaper published in Korea from 1908 to 1942. It was merged from the Chōsen shinpō and the Chōsen Times, and later merged into the Keijō nippō by order of the Japanese colonial government.

The newspaper was seen as among the three top Japanese-language newspapers in Korea during the Japanese colonial period, along with Keijō nippō and Fuzan nippō.

Digital copies of most issues are now available across several different services in South Korea and Japan. The Korean Newspaper Archive has copies of the newspaper from January 1924 to February 1942, and the National Institute of Korean History has copies between December 1908 to March 1921. The Japanese National Diet Library also holds copies of the paper.

== History ==
The newspaper formed via a merger between two Incheon-based Japanese newspapers: the Chōsen shinpō and the Chōsen Times. Its founding leader was Kazuo Hagitani. It was approved for publication on November 20, 1908, and published its first issue on December 1. At the time, Incheon was a hub for Japanese settlers in Korea. The newspaper primarily published information about commerce for the settlers, and also ran help wanted ads. It was a prominent paper in Incheon, and was a source of regional news.

In 1910, its circulation was 8,529 copies. This was less than the Keijō nippō's 19,494, but more than the Fuzan Nippō's 2,400.

On December 18, 1919, the paper moved its headquarters from Incheon to Keijō (Seoul). Makiyama Kōzō, a Japanese politician, businessman, and former reporter for the Keijō nippō, took over leadership of Chōsen shinbun around this time. It published twice daily around this period, and expanded from being an economic newspaper to being more of a general newspaper that also covered current events. The newspaper saw a rise in sales around this period; it had a circulation of 25,428 in 1926, which was higher than the Governor-General of Chōsen–backed Keijō nippō's number of 24,919, as well as the Fuzan Nippō's 14,352. However, it still sold fewer copies than the native Korean The Dong-A Ilbo's 29,901. It maintained offices throughout Korea and even had a few in China.

The newspaper became suspended several times after it engaged in heated public debates with the Keijō nippō and after it criticized some of the governor-general's policies. Gojō stayed in his executive position until November 1937, when Korean entrepreneur Mun Myŏnggi (문명기; 文明琦) took over. Mun held the position until May 1938, and was succeeded by Kim Kapsun (김갑순; 金甲淳).

In February 1942, the paper became affected by an order of the Japanese Governor-General to consolidate newspapers to one per region. It then became merged into the Keijō nippō.

== See also ==
- List of newspapers in Korea
- History of newspapers in Korea
- Korea under Japanese rule
- Category:Japanese-language newspapers published in Korea
