= Nansen nippō =

1911–1941 Japanese newspaper in Korea

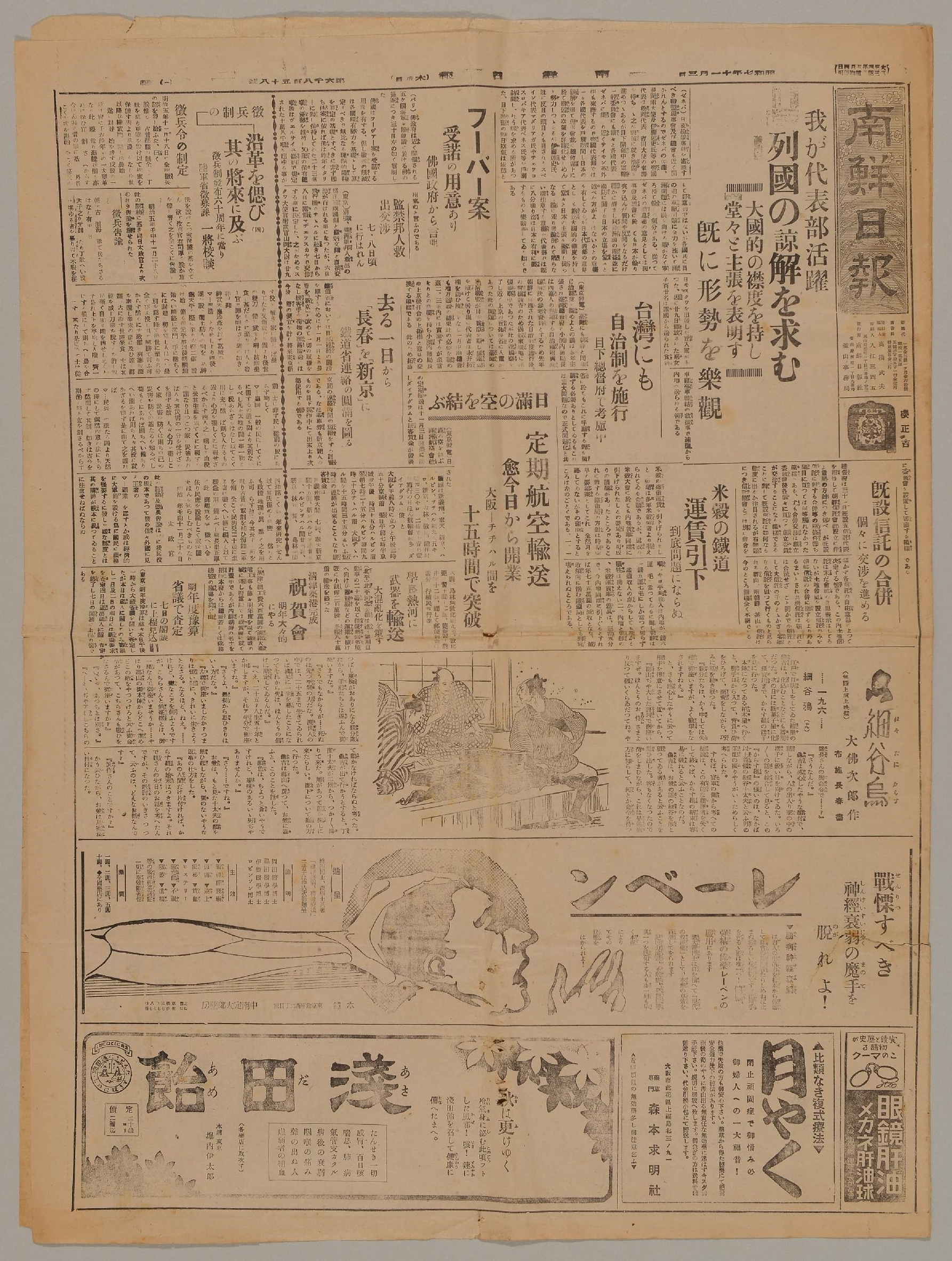
- Cover of the November 3, 1932 edition
- Founded: March 1911
- Ceased publication: June 1941
- Language: Japanese
- City: Masan
- Country: Korea, Empire of Japan

Nansen Nippō (南鮮日報; Korean: 남선일보; RR: Namseon Ilbo; MR: Namsŏn Ilbo; lit. 'The Southern Korea Daily') was a Japanese-language newspaper published in Masan, Korea under Japanese rule from 1911 to 1941. The paper was the successor to the 1906 Masan Shinpō. The paper was eventually merged into the Fuzan Nippō in 1941.

== History ==
The newspaper's predecessor was the Masan Shinpō, which had been founded in 1906 for the Japanese settler community in Masan. However, it struggled to stay open, and closed in 1908. It was reopened on October 1, 1908, but again struggled to stay open. Afterwards, it was sold to the Keijō Nippō for 2,000 yen. The newspaper was renamed Nansen Nippō, and began publication in March 1911.

In 1915, the Keijō Nippō turned over control of the paper to Oka Yoichi (岡庸一), free of charge, for an initial period of ten years. After that period, the paper was sold to Kawatani Shizuo (河谷靜夫) for 3,000 yen. Kawatani moved the headquarters and printing facility near the stream Jangguncheon in 1928.

The newspaper was affected by colonial government orders for consolidation upon the beginning of the Pacific War. It and the other Masan-based newspaper Nansen Jihō were integrated into the Busan-based Fuzan Nippō in June 1941.

== See also ==
- List of newspapers in Korea
- History of newspapers in Korea
- Category:Japanese-language newspapers published in Korea
