= Hansŏng sunbo =

1883–1884 first Korean-language newspaper

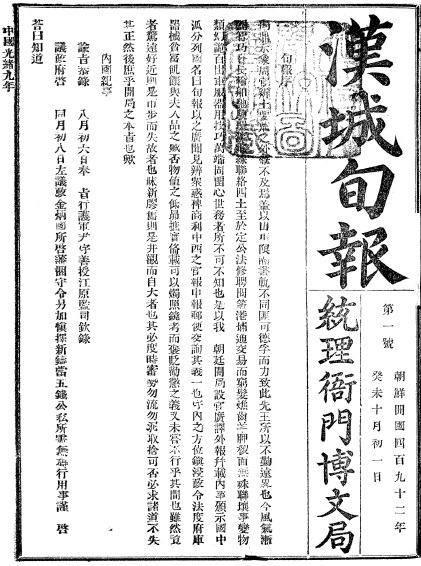
- The inaugural issue (October 31, 1883)
- Founder(s): Park Yung-hyo
- Founded: October 31, 1883
- Language: Classical Chinese
- Ceased publication: December 1884
- Headquarters: Jeo-dong, Seoul
- Country: Joseon
- Readership: Public and private

- Hansŏng sunbo
- Hangul: 한성순보
- Hanja: 漢城旬報
- Revised Romanization: Hanseong sunbo
- McCune–Reischauer: Hansŏng sunbo

Hansŏng sunbo (Korean: 한성순보; Hanja: 漢城旬報) was the first modern native Korean newspaper. It was published in Seoul (then called Hanseong), Joseon from 1883 to 1884. It was written in Classical Chinese (한문; 漢文). It is not the first newspaper to be published in Korea; that was the 1881 Chōsen Shinpō, which was primarily written in both Japanese and Classical Chinese.

The newspaper ceased publication because its facilities were destroyed in a fire during the failed Gapsin Coup. It was succeeded by a weekly newspaper Hansŏng jubo, in 1886.

The newspaper is thought to have produced 40 issues before its closure, but the only known extant copies are of issues No. 1 to No. 36. They are stored in the Seoul National University Library and National Library of Korea.

== History ==
Prior to the newspaper's publication, the Korean government already had a publication entitled Jobo (조보; 朝報). However, the publication was mostly just for government officials and was limited to mostly domestic issues. Korea had then just emerged from centuries of isolationism around this point, and ambassadors who visited foreign countries observed that general-interest modern newspapers that published on international issues were useful.

In 1882, Park Yung-hyo and other members of the Joseon Susinsa (Joseon's ambassadors to Japan) were inspired by the rise of the modern press in Japan. They wanted to develop a native press in Korea. To this end, they brought several Japanese reporters and printing experts as consultants and returned to Korea. Park met with the Korean monarch Gojong several times, and advocated for the creation of a publication. Around February 1883, Gojong approved the paper's creation.

Park and Yu Kil-chun, who were both considered by the mainstream government to be radical reformists around that time, initially took the lead in preparing for the publication of the paper. However, around April 1883, Park was suddenly demoted, and Yu became ill. Park's demotion was possibly due to the influence of the powerful Yeoheung Min clan, which saw Park's views as anti-monarchy. Afterwards, the paper was led by politicians who were considered more moderate monarchists of the foreign affairs department; cousins Kim Man-sik and Kim In-sik (김인식; 金寅植) were put in charge of the paper. Most Japanese consultants were sent back to Japan, with only Inoue Kakugorō staying behind to supervise operations. They worked out of an office in Jeo-dong.

Hansŏng sunbo began publication on October 31, 1883. It was published by the Banmunguk, the government printing office and first Korean modern printing operation. The paper was published three times per month, beginning on the first of each month (Korean calendar). Both public officials and private citizens could subscribe to the paper. Copies of the paper were delivered quickly after printing to each government office. The government paid the publishing office 50 mun per copy printed. Each issue had 18 pages, and was around 25 cm × 9 cm (9.8 in × 3.5 in) in size.

Until its end, the newspaper published without interruption. However, it closed around December 1884, when the headquarters and printing equipment were destroyed by fire during the failed Gapsin Coup. After a hiatus, the paper reemerged in 1886 as a weekly paper entitled Hansŏng jubo.

== Contents ==
The paper divided its publications into two topics: domestic and foreign affairs. Domestic issues consisted of central and local government announcements, as well as private reporting on current happenings. Foreign affairs covered global geopolitics, military technology, and modern defense. The paper overall published with the intent to modernize Korea. A sparse number of articles introduced the ideas of parliamentary democracy and civil rights.

The newspaper also published translated articles from foreign newspapers. This includes articles from the Chinese newspapers Shen Bao, Zi Lin Hu Bao, Chinese and Foreign Gazette, and the Universal Circulating Herald. Japanese newspapers included the Jiji Shinpō, Tokyo Nichi Nichi Shimbun, and Hochi Shimbun.

== See also ==
- List of the oldest newspapers
- List of newspapers in Korea
- History of newspapers in Korea
- Tongnip sinmun
