= Heijō shinpō =

1905–1908 Japanese newspaper in Korea

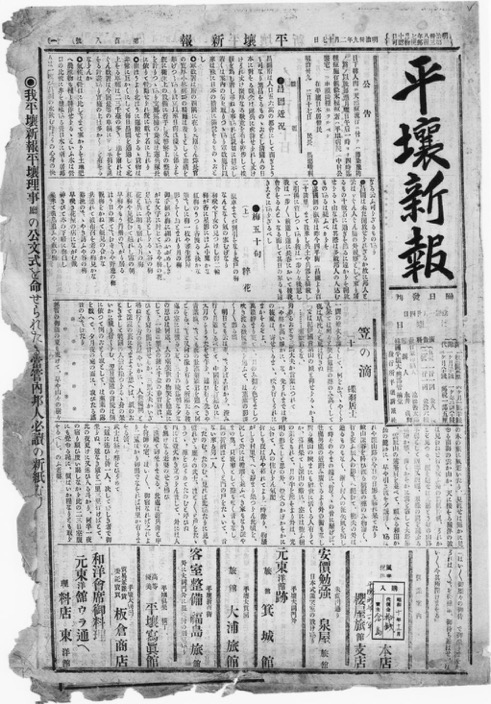
- Cover of the February 17, 1906 issue
- Founded: July 1905
- Language: Japanese, Korean
- Ceased publication: 1908
- City: Pyongyang
- Country: Korean Empire

Heijō Shinpō (平壌新報; Korean: 평양신보; RR: Pyeongyang Sinbo; MR: P'yŏngyang Sinbo) was a Japanese-language and Korean-language newspaper published in Pyongyang, Korean Empire from 1905 to 1908.

The newspaper was founded in either July 1905 or in 1906 by teacher Shindō Yoshio (真藤義雄), who was teaching the Japanese language there around that time. Adachi Kenzō, who had previously founded the newspapers in Korea Kanjō Shinpō and Chōsen Jihō and assassinated the Korean queen, advocated for Shindō to receive financial support from the Japanese government for starting the paper. The newspaper did not last long, however, and was acquired by its local rival Heijō Jitsugyō Shinpō in 1908, and renamed to Heijō Nippō. In 1912, it was consolidated with Heijō Shinbun and renamed to Heijō Nichinichi Shinbun. However, this newspaper closed in 1914 due to financial difficulties.
