= Daitō shinpō =

1904–1906 Japanese newspaper in Korea

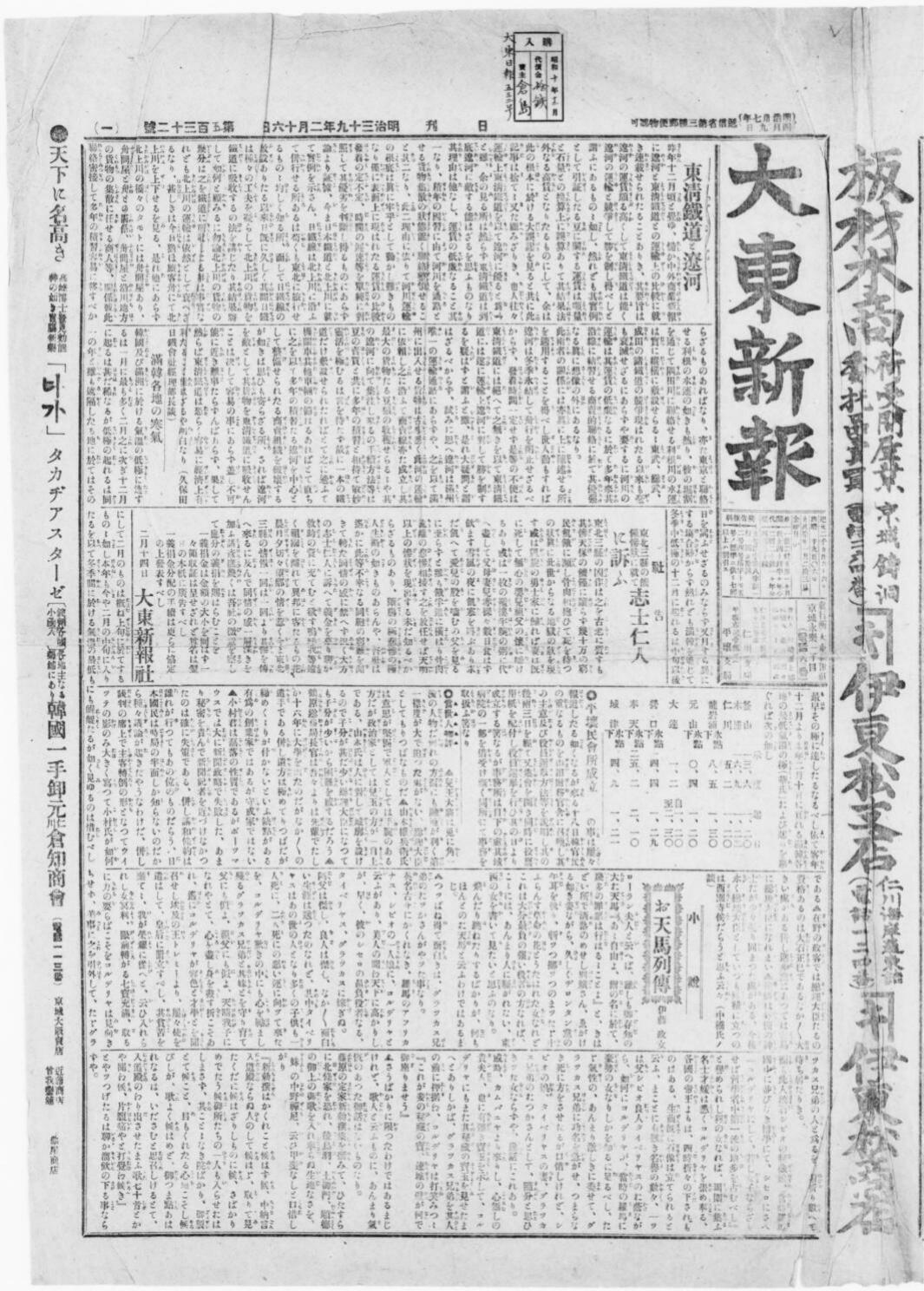
- Front page of the February 16, 1906 edition
- Founder: Kikuchi Kenjō
- Founded: April 18, 1904
- Ceased publication: August 1906

The Daitō shinpō (大東新報; Korean: 대동신보; MR: Taedong sinbo) was a Japanese newspaper published in the Korean Empire between 1904 and 1906.

The paper was founded by Kikuchi Kenjō, who had just been dismissed from his presidency of another Japanese newspaper in Korea, the Kanjō shinpō. The Daitō shinpō generally promoted Japanese activities in Korea, although it may have criticized them on occasion. In 1906, the newspaper was purchased by the Japanese Resident-General of Korea, Itō Hirobumi, and merged with around six other newspapers into the Keijō Nippō.

== Background ==
The newspaper's founder was notable Japanese journalist and politician in Korea, Kikuchi Kenjō (菊池謙讓). Kikuchi was previously a journalist for the newspaper in Japan Kokumin Shimbun, and had previously participated in the highly controversial 1895 assassination of the Korean queen, alongside the staff of other Japanese newspaper in Korea Kanjō shinpō. After the murder, Kikuchi and the other assassins were recalled to Japan and put on trial on charges of murder and conspiracy to commit murder. Controversially, they were acquitted of all charges, despite the court conceding that they had at least conspired to commit murder.

Kikuchi returned to Korea in 1898 as the editor-in-chief of the Kanjō shinpō. When the Kanjō shinpō was originally founded around 1895, it was the only newspaper, Japanese or Korean, that was published in Korea's capital Seoul. However, following the Kanjō shinpō's example, a number of native Korean newspapers began being published by the time Kikuchi returned. They published nationalist narratives that combatted the pro-Japanese narratives in the Kanjō shinpō. In response, the Japanese government began investing significant funds in Japanese newspapers and pushed for them to counter the Korean narratives.

== History ==
After expressing dissatisfaction with Kikuchi's performance, the Japanese legation relieved him of his position as president of the Kanjō shinpō in 1903. He then founded the Daitō shinpō in 1904. The paper more firmly pushed Japanese narratives than the Kanjō shinpō had done. Its publisher was Murasaki Jutaro (村崎重太郎) and editor Etō Doshihiko (衛藤俊彦).

The newspaper was ordered to cease publication from August 13 to 18, 1904, for some reason that South Korean scholar Ha Ji-yeon (하지연) could not ascertain. Ha guessed that Kikuchi possibly published a narrative that the Japanese legation disagreed with. An article in the Encyclopedia of Korean Culture discusses the censorship in the context of Japanese military secrets being leaked during the 1904–1905 Russo-Japanese War, although it does not directly name it as the cause.

In June 1906, the newspaper was granted permission to move its headquarters into the Korean monarch Gojong's personal villa in Jeo-dong. Ha theorized that the Japanese Resident-General of Korea, which had recently assumed indirect control over Korea, was responsible for this.

In July 1906, the newspaper was purchased by the Japanese Resident-General of Korea for a price of 3,000 won. It was merged with the Kanjō shinpō and five other newspapers into the Keijō Nippō. The Keijō Nippō persisted until Korea was liberated from Japanese colonial rule in 1945.

== See also ==
- List of newspapers in Korea
- History of newspapers in Korea
- Korea under Japanese rule
- Category:Japanese-language newspapers published in Korea
