= Chōsen shinpō =

1881 first newspaper in Korea

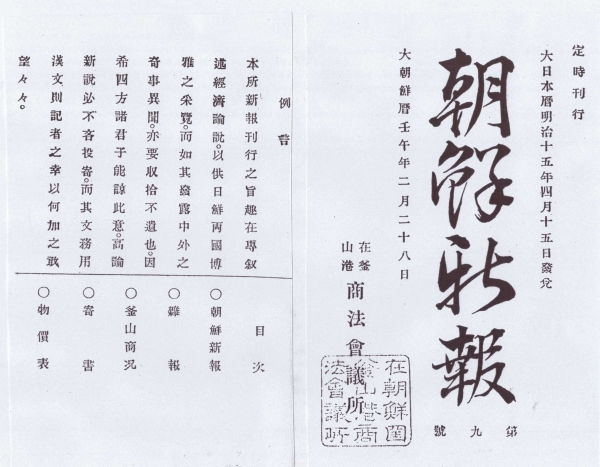
- The fifth issue (April 15, 1882)
- Publisher: Chamber of Commerce
- Founded: December 10, 1881
- Ceased publication: Unknown
- Language: Japanese, Classical Chinese, Korean
- City: Busan
- Country: Joseon

Chōsen shinpō (朝鮮新報; Korean: 조선신보; lit. 'Korea Newspaper'), was a newspaper written in Japanese and Classical Chinese, with at least one article known to have been written in Korean in the Hangul script. It was the first newspaper to be published in Korea, with its first issue released in Busan primarily for Japanese readers on December 10, 1881. It is not known with certainty when the paper ceased publication, although it had at least twelve issues and the assumption of a thirteenth issue written on the twelfth.

Well-educated Koreans would have been able to read the Classical Chinese and Hangul parts of the newspaper. The first full Korean-language newspaper to be published was Hanseong sunbo, which was published in 1883. Japan's own first newspaper was not in the Japanese language; it was the 1861 Nagasaki Shipping List and Advertiser, which was published by an Englishman.

Albert Altman wrote in 1984 that the only known extant copies of the paper are held in the Meiji Newspaper and Magazine Library of the University of Tokyo. Only issues between five and twelve were available. The date of the first two issues are known from a different newspaper that wrote about the Chōsen, the Tokyo Nichi Nichi Shimbun.

== History ==
The Korea–Japan Treaty of 1876 saw the Korean state Joseon cede significant access rights to the port city of Busan to Japan. The Japanese population of Busan had been fewer than 100 in 1875, but by 1882, it reached 1,800.

Chōsen shinpō was published by the Chamber of Commerce (商法会議所, Shōhō kaigishō) in Busan beginning on December 10, 1881. The first issue was printed on a single sheet of paper. The second issue followed two months later on February 5, 1882, and was printed as a newsbook (a format that had, by then, already gone out of style in Japan and the West).

The publication had the characteristics of a modern newspaper: it was published periodically (on the 5th, 15th, and 25th of each month), meant for public consumption, and varied in content.

=== Content ===
The content of the paper differed by language. The scholar Albert Altman wrote of this:

In the Chinese language, the paper assumed the role of mentor, knowledgable and wise in the new ways essential for the survival in the contemporary world, instructing a stripling Korean pupil. The tone was respectful, the manner correct. In the Japanese language, the Chōsen shinpō did not speak to Koreans; it spoke about them. Talking to each other in this manner, the Japanese voiced attitudes unuttered in the Chinese language; to have expressed them would have subverted the teacher's role the Japanese had given themselves in that language. In Japanese, the Chōsen shinpō was condescending towards Koreans and contemptuous of their culture.

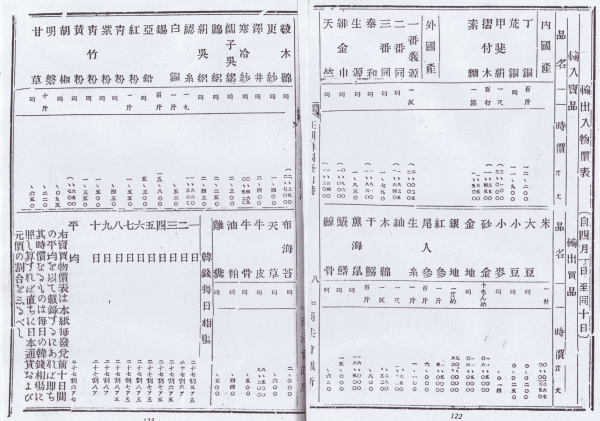
Import and export price list (1882)

Japanese-language articles discussed doing business in Korea, which it sometimes described as irritating due to the Koreans. Each issue had information on various transactions that had occurred in Korea. Some of the writing reflected Japanese views on Koreans, including the stereotype that Koreans were stubborn. One quote read:

Unexpectedly, there are those who have haircuts, wear Japanese clothes and understand Japanese superbly... Even among the Koreans there are some who are civilized.

The Japanese articles commented on Korean politics and government policies. It chastised conservative, anti-foreign officials such as the Heungseon Daewongun:

The chief of the 'Stubborn Party', the Daewongun, is really stubborn... Although he is sixty-two, he has the spirit of a twenty-year-old and does only stubborn things. It is said he pulls out his gray hair. It would be better if he extracted his stubborn spirit. He is certainly a bothersome old man.

However, some articles are critical of the behavior of Japanese people in Korea. In one article, a story was told of how Japanese merchants helped refloat a Korean vessel that had run aground. Afterwards, the Japanese merchants leveraged the favor they were owed to pressure the Korean owner of the vessel into selling their grain at a lower price. The paper criticized this behavior as causing ill-will in Korea towards Japanese trade. Another article read:

However barbarous a people may be, they are not sticks and stones, nor are they wild beasts... If they repay us with virtue and morality, we will be shamed.

Only one article in the paper was known to have been written in Hangul, and it was a direct translation of a Japanese article. The script would not have been popular among Korean intellectuals, who around that time looked down on the script as one for the less educated.

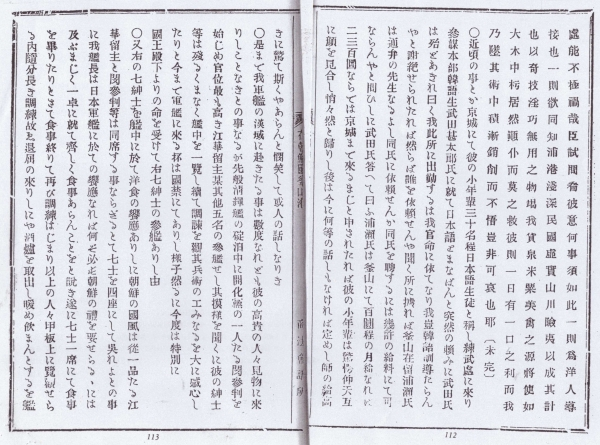
From the right (read vertically), Classical Chinese writing for five lines, then Japanese writing (1882)

The Classical Chinese portions targeted reform-minded Korean intellectuals with persuasive essays on how Korea should be reformed in order to avoid being dominated by Japan. Some reforms were general, such as recommendations on improved agricultural and manufacturing practices. Others promoted changes that aligned with Japanese trade and policy interests. For example, letters from Ōkura Kihachirō and Takahashi Keihaku were published in Classical Chinese in some of the papers. These letters persuaded Korean readers to pursue a number of industries that facilitated trade with Japan or used Japanese technology. In several issues, the issue of tariffs was discussed at length, which roughly aligned with the timing of negotiations on the issue held between Joseon, Japan, the United States, and Qing China.

However, some of the articles published in Chinese contained writings from Song Pyŏngsŏn that was critical of both Japan and foreign influence in Korea.

The paper also advocated for changes to Korean currency (at the time, the Korean mun), which the Japanese government had also unsuccessfully pushed for on a number of occasions. The sole coin in circulation at the time was the Sangpyeong Tongbo, which was of a small denomination, heavy, and particularly susceptible to exchange rate fluctuations. For even minor transactions, Korean merchants needed to have a number of servants carry numerous strings that each bore a thousand coins.

== See also ==
- History of newspapers in Korea
- List of newspapers in Korea
- Korea under Japanese rule
- Category:Japanese-language newspapers published in Korea

== Additional reading ==
- 권, 정원; 김, 소영 (2022-08-30). 국역 조선신보 (in Korean and Japanese). ISBN 9791165873431. – Transcriptions of the known articles and translations into modern Korean
