= Chōsen jihō =

1894–1941 Japanese newspaper in Korea

Chōsen Jihō
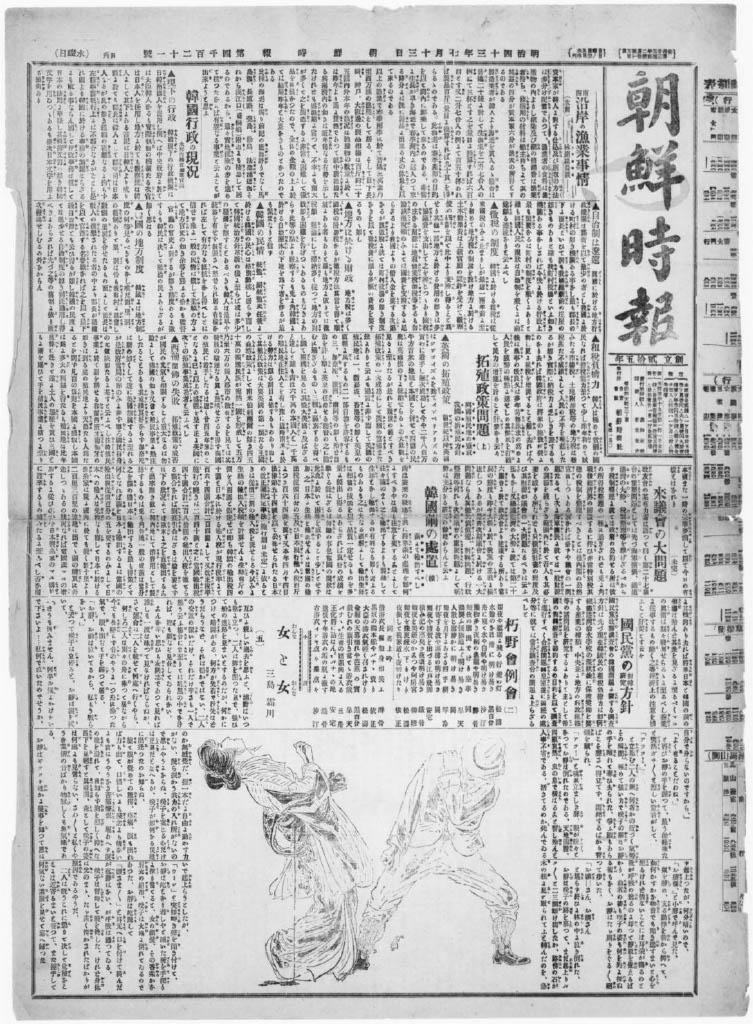
- Cover of the July 13, 1910 edition
- Founder: Adachi Kenzō
- Publisher: Chōsen Jihōsha
- Founded: November 21, 1894
- Ceased publication: May 27, 1941
- Language: Japanese; Korean

Chōsen Jihō (Japanese: 朝鮮時報; Korean: 조선시보; MR: Chosŏn Sibo) was a Japanese-language and Korean-language daily newspaper published in Korea from 1894 to 1941.

The paper had a predecessor under a different founder that went by Fuzan Shōkyō (釜山商況; 부산상황; Pusan Sanghwang). It was founded in Busan on December 5, 1892. It changed its name to Tokua Bōeki Shinbun (東亞貿易新聞; 동아무역신문; Tonga Muyŏk Sinmun) at some point afterwards.

It consistently rivaled the Fuzan Nippō paper, also based in Busan, and began to underperform it. After several fires and a 1940 order by the Japanese colonial government for there to be one paper per province, it was absorbed into the Fuzan Nippō. The Fuzan Nippō was then seized by the United States after the 1945 liberation of Korea, and was converted into the modern South Korean Busan Ilbo.

== History ==
The newspaper's predecessor catered to a demographic of rōnin who had settled in Korea. It was headquartered in what is today Gwangbok-dong. It relocated to Daecheong-dong later. Beginning with the publication of the Tokua, it began publishing in Korean alongside the Japanese. However, it went under a hiatus, possibly due to management difficulties or Japanese press restrictions during the First Sino-Japanese War.

Japanese consul in Murota Yoshiaya paid 400 won for the acquisition of the paper, and assigned journalist Adachi Kenzō to take over its operations. The paper restarted on November 21, 1894, again in today's Gwangbok-dong area. The paper published in both Japanese and Korean. For its early history, it was closely related to a publication in Japan called the Kyushu Nichi Nichi Shinbun (九州日日新報), which was based in Kumamoto Prefecture. Many of the paper's employees also hailed from that region, and they even put a restriction on non-Kumamoto employees from having executive positions.

Adachi was an ardent nationalist and expansionist, and previously had little experience in journalism. Adachi moved to work in Seoul, and was again provided support to found his own newspaper, Kanjō Shinpō. He and the staff of that newspaper became a primary group involved in the assassination of the Korean queen. The South Korean scholar Park Yong-gu (박용구) argued that the Japanese government wanted to forward its expansion into Korea around this time with Adachi's papers.

After Adachi's departure to Seoul, a man surnamed Tataki took over as president. The newspaper reportedly struggled to keep running. It had a circulation of 2,412 in 1910. By 1915, it was still run by Tataki, and was published under the joint-stock company Chōsen Jihōsha (朝鮮時報社). Around that time, it published six pages per issue and charged subscribers 40 sen per month. On April 10, 1919, the company became publicly traded and had capital of 250,000 yen. Around then, it had four employees, including Tataki, and expanded their headquarters. However, the company closed in December 1919 and Tataki went on a hiatus.

The company's former employees reopened the company at the end of July 1920. Its president was Amakawa Hirokichi. Amakawa invested money in the company, and renovated the headquarters. The newspaper began distributing to Masan, Daegu, and other cities in southern Korea.

The paper was a consistent rival with the Fuzan Nippō, another Japanese paper based in Busan. While the paper initially outperformed the Fuzan, it later began to struggle to compete. By 1933, it reported having 100,000 yen in capital, and reduced the number of pages per issue to four. In the early hours of January 10, 1938, a fire broke out at their factory, and caused 9,000 yen of damages. Unable to purchase new equipment, they printed the papers at another facility in Busan. They again suffered from another fire on February 15, 1940, which caused 3,000 yen of damages. Around that time, the Governor-General of Chōsen mandated that regional newspapers consolidate, so the company was merged into the Fuzan Nippō on May 27, 1941.

== Contents ==
Its editorial team was divided into two groups, one that published on "harder" stories and one for "softer" stories. The paper primarily published on business and economic issues. It regularly published data about trade, agriculture, and fishing. At the time, Busan was a hub for business in Korea. Over time, it followed a typical pattern (according to a writer for the Korean Newspaper Archive) of publications beginning specialized in business, then transitioning to general reporting on current events. The number of advertisements on each issue has been described as high, with many of the advertisements being written in Korean as well.

== See also ==
- List of newspapers in Korea
- History of newspapers in Korea
- Category:Japanese-language newspapers published in Korea
