= Chūsen nippō =

1909–1945 Japanese newspaper in Korea

Chūsen Nippō
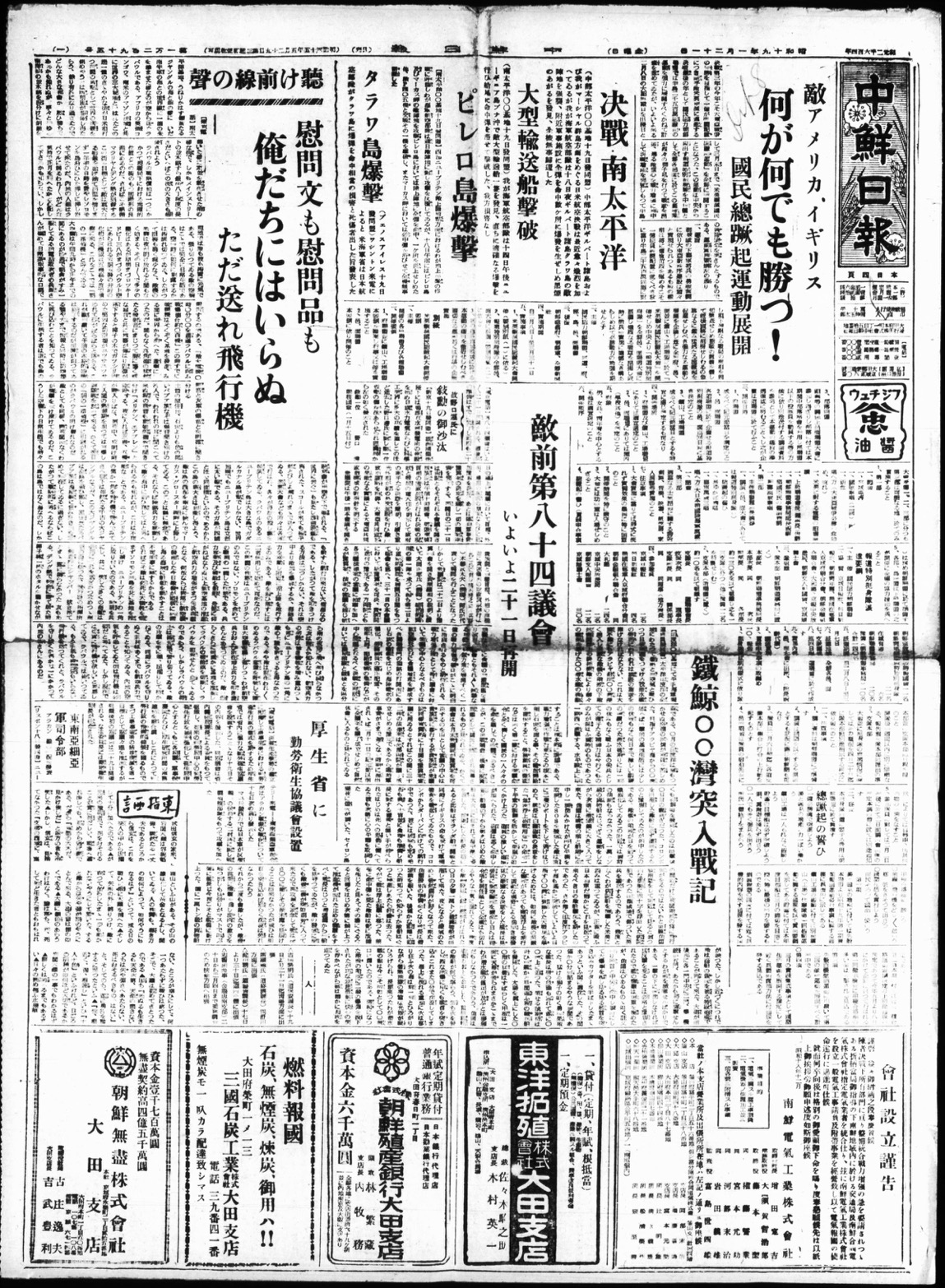
- Cover of the January 21, 1944 issue
- Founded: 1909 (as Ōta Shinbun)
- Ceased publication: August 17, 1945
- City: Daejeon
- Country: Korea, Empire of Japan

Chūsen Nippō (中鮮日報; Korean: 중선일보) was a Japanese-language newspaper published in Daejeon, Korea from 1909 to 1945.

The newspaper went by a number of names over time. It was founded as Ōta shinbun (大田新聞; 대전신문), changed names to Sannan shinpō (三南新報; 삼남신보) in 1910, was acquired by the Keijō Nippōsha in June 1912 and renamed to Konan nippō (湖南日報; 호남일보), then to Chōsen chuō shinbun (朝鮮中央新聞; 조선중앙신문), then received its final name in either April 1935 or in 1936.

The paper was requisitioned on August 17, 1945, shortly after the liberation of Korea. The newspaper reportedly wrote of the liberation day, August 15, in the Korean language, with use of a Korean dictionary that was given to them. Afterwards, the newspaper's assets were seized and used by the Korean newspaper Dongbang sinmun, which was the only newspaper publishing in Daejeon around that time. The newspaper continued publication until the 1950–1953 Korean War; during the war, the facilities were completely destroyed.

== See also ==
- List of newspapers in Korea
- History of newspapers in Korea
- Category:Japanese-language newspapers published in Korea
