= The Seoul Press =

1905–1937 English-language newspaper in Korea

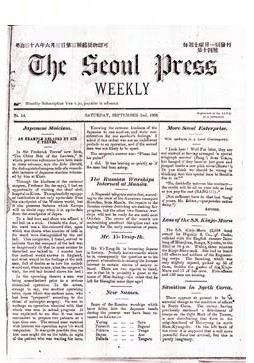
- Front page of an issue
- Founded: 3 June 1905
- Ceased publication: 30 May 1937
- Political alignment: Pro-Empire of Japan
- Country: Empire of Japan

The Seoul Press was an English-language newspaper published in the Korean Empire and Korea under Japanese rule from 1905 to 1937. It is considered to have been the de facto official English-language publication of the Japanese colonial government in Korea, and was the sole daily English-language paper published in Korea during that time. It was subordinated to the Japanese-language newspaper in Korea Keijō Nippō in 1930, and closed under a colonial government order in 1937.

== History ==
=== Founding and purchase by Japan ===
The paper was founded in Seoul, Korean Empire by the British journalist John Weekley Hodge on 3 June 1905, as a weekly newspaper.

At the time, other English-language publications published in Korea, such as Ernest Bethell's The Korea Daily News and Homer Hulbert's Korea Review, criticized Japan's actions in Korea. After Korea was placed under the indirect rule of Japan in 1905, the Japanese Resident-General of Korea Itō Hirobumi began efforts to control the press in Korea. In August 1905, Hodge and a Japanese emissary to Seoul negotiated a deal in which Hodge would publish more positively about Japan's takeover to counter Bethell. Hodge received a payment of 350 yen per month.

By January 1906, Itō's press secretary Zumoto Motosada negotiated the outright purchase of Hodge's paper and Zumoto became its manager. Zumoto had previously founded The Japan Times and reportedly spoke excellent English. He turned it into a daily paper and published the first issue on 5 December 1906. On 10 December 1906, an article in The Japan Times wrote of the takeover: "Seoul now has a newspaper based on facts and truth; this newspaper will strive for order and peace". (Note: 『이제 서울은 사실과 진실에 입각한 신문을 가졌으며 이 신문은 질서와 평화를 위해 분투할 것』) The paper was closely linked to The Japan Times throughout its history, with The Seoul Press reportedly even being seen as a branch office of the former. The Seoul Press offered subscriptions to The Japan Times to people in Korea, and The Japan Times offered The Seoul Press in Japan.

=== Later history ===
Zumoto departed from the paper in early April 1909 in order to move to New York City, United States. He founded the Oriental Information Bureau (東洋通報社) there, which promoted Japan and its interests.

The Resident-General applied pressure to the critical newspapers and the British government. Bethell was subjected to a lengthy legal battle and died in 1909. After the 1910 Japanese annexation of Korea, The Seoul Press and Japan Times purchased The Korea Daily News and turned it into the Korean-language Maeil Sinbo. That newspaper was then subordinated under the Keijō Nippō, the de facto official newspaper of the Japanese colonial government. The Seoul Press remained independent, but it consistently struggled with its finances, as there weren't many English-speakers in Korea. It was eventually subordinated to the Keijō Nippō in February 1930.

Until its end, it operated as the sole English daily newspaper published in Korea. It voluntarily closed under the colonial government's Directive No. 1089 on 30 May 1937. Its final issue was No. 9089. South Korean historian Jeong Jin-seok (정진석) reasoned that, by this point, foreigners in Korea generally had enough proficiency in either Japanese or Korean for reading other newspapers.

== Contents ==
An editorial on 8 March 1907 wrote critically of the National Debt Repayment Movement, which was a grassroots fundraising movement to pay off Korea's debts to Japan in order to protect Korea's sovereignty. The following day, The Seoul Press published another editorial entitled "Korea's Friends" that singled out and criticized Bethell and Hulbert for their support of the movement. The Korea Daily News published a reply to the editorial on 12 March. The Japan Times wrote in support of The Seoul Press, and claimed "The world knows the real truth, that these anti-Japanese crusaders in Korea are actually Korea's enemies". (Note: 『반일적인 한국의 십자군들이 오히려 한국의 적이라는 사실을 세계는 지켜보고 있다』)

The paper was intended to justify and paint a particularly positive image of Japan's colonization of Korea. According to the historian Mark E. Caprio, articles relating to events in colonial Korea were sometimes reported differently in The Seoul Press and The Japan Times, but that the reportage in both coincided in depicting the "positive atmosphere that the Japanese... strove to convey to Westerners". It highlighted cases of Koreans assisting Japanese settlers, and portrayed the Korean former emperor Sunjong as willingly and gratefully accepting Japanese rule.

Some articles were more negative in tone. It reprinted reports written by Westerners that criticized Korean culture and civilization, and promoted Japan's colonization. One such article was written by J. H. De Forest, who had spent one month visiting Korea and lived for 36 years in Japan. He argued, in Caprio's words, that Korea lacked the "necessary criteria of a civilized society, as seen in their nonexistent traditional literature and the lack of trees on their naked hills". De Forest hopefully concluded that, because contact between Japan and Korea had increased, "a new life is coming to these wronged [naked] hills and a new hope to the tillers of the soil".

== See also ==
- List of newspapers in Korea – pre-1945 newspapers, including Japanese papers
- History of newspapers in Korea – prose history
