= Kanjō shinpō =

1895–1906 Japanese newspaper in Korea

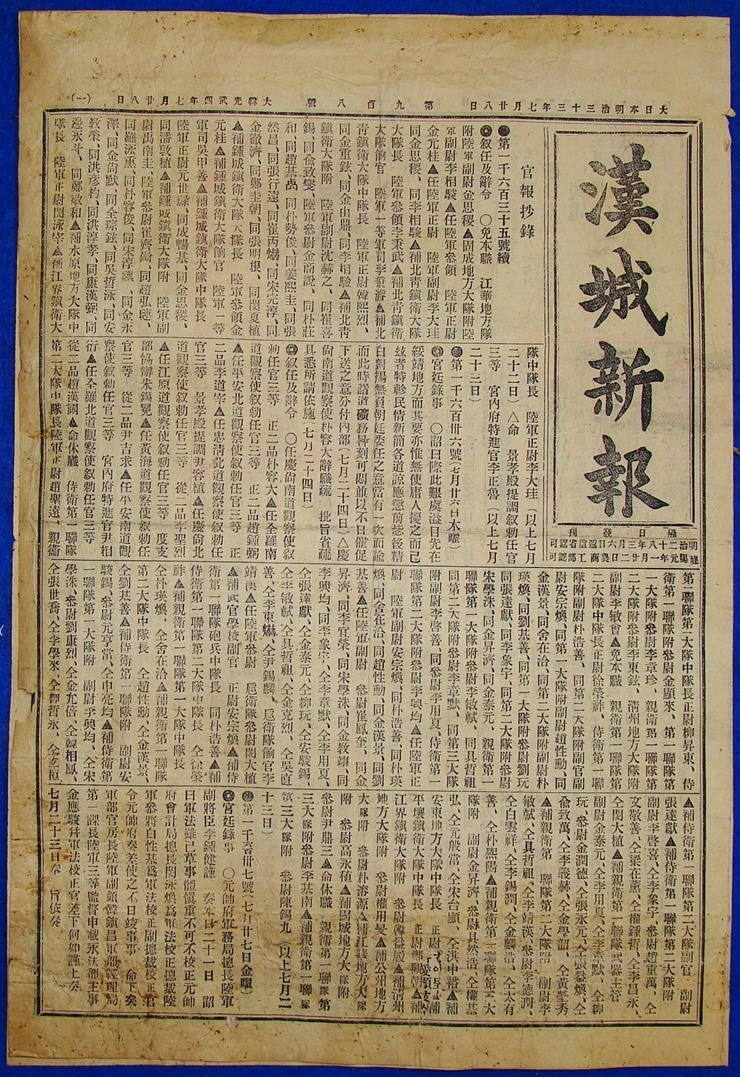
- Front page of issue no. 908 (1900)
- Founder: Adachi Kenzō
- Founded: February 1895
- Ceased publication: July 31, 1906
- Language: Japanese
- Headquarters: Seoul, Joseon (later Korean Empire)

The Kanjō shinpō (漢城新報; Korean: 한성신보; lit. 'Hanseong News') was a Japanese- and Korean-language newspaper published in Seoul, Joseon (later Korean Empire). It was founded in either late 1894 or February 1895, and ran until it was acquired by the Japanese Resident-General of Korea in 1906. It was then merged with another newspaper, Daitō shinpō, and became the Keijō Nippō.

In 1895, its employees were all involved in the assassination of the Korean queen.

It has since been described by historians as a "propaganda newspaper" that promoted Japan's interests in Korea.

== Background ==
Beginning around the 1860s, groups of young men that engaged in political violence emerged in Japan. They were called sōshi (壮士) by the press, which literally meant "manly warrior", but developed the connotation of "thug". Beginning in the 1880s, a number of them moved to Korea to forward nationalist goals. A number of them became journalists, and became associated with various Japanese newspapers in Korea.

Around the time of the 1894–1895 First Sino-Japanese War, Minister of Foreign Affairs Inoue Kaoru felt that a newspaper was needed not only for the Japanese residents in Seoul, but also the Korean residents. At the time, no newspaper was being published in Seoul, with the historic Korean-run newspaper Tongnip sinmun yet to begin publication. Inoue came into contact with Adachi Kenzō through the introduction of the Japanese consul in Busan. Adachi had just recently founded the Chōsen Jihō newspaper in Busan. Adachi offered to start a newspaper, and submitted a proposal for its creation. Inoue accepted the proposal and provided Ministry of Foreign Affairs funding for the paper.

== Early history ==
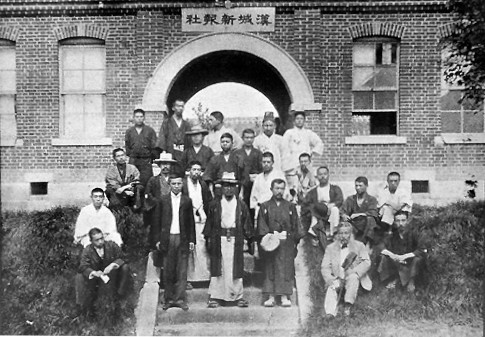
The newspaper's staff in front of their headquarters

Adachi had significant control over the paper, although he was supervised by Inoue. Adachi recruited a staff that included head writer Kunitomo Shigechi, editor Kobayakawa Hideo (小早川秀雄), reporter Sasaki Tadashi (佐佐木正), and Korean reporter Yun Don-gu (윤돈구; 尹敦求). (Note: Yun was the relative of an official in the Korean government, which may have been a motivating factor for his hire.) An article in the Encyclopedia of Korean Culture notes that Adachi had little prior experience in journalism, and describes the paper as more of an impromptu activist group than a newspaper.

Adachi and Kunitomo had significant ties to the sōshi-affiliated group Tenyūkyō, with Adachi reportedly having previously massacred Chinese merchants during the Sino-Japanese War. The historian Danny Orbach claims the Kanjō shinpō became "a new center for ruffianism".

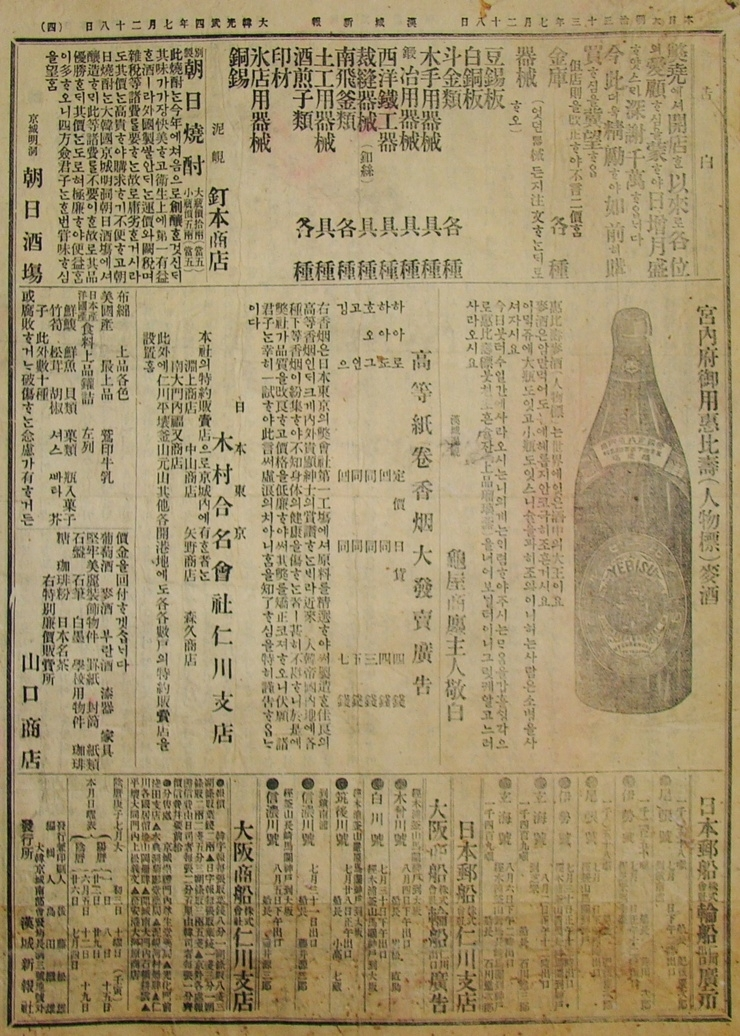
Advertisements on the fourth page of an issue (1900)

Initially, each issue was released every other day. According to the Encyclopedia of Korean Culture, the format of the paper changed a number of times. In one issue, the first two pages were in Korean, the third page was in Japanese, and the fourth contained advertisements. Each page had four columns, with 36 lines per column and 17 characters per line. On January 23, 1896, a Korean version of the paper in mixed script began to be published under the same name. Page sizes were increased beginning with the 102nd issue. On October 1, 1903, Korean and Japanese versions of the paper began to be printed daily.

The Encyclopedia of Korean Culture asserts that the Kanjō shinpō likely influenced later Korean newspapers, as Japan had greater experience and technology with newspapers and because there was no native Korean newspaper in Seoul at the time.

In the paper's early history, the paper advocated for general reforms in Korea, which led it to be popular amongst Koreans. It even ended up publishing the first serialized Korean novel. However, sentiment eventually turned against the Kanjō shinpō as it began publishing more and more pro-Japanese narratives that advocated for Korea's takeover by Japan.

== Assassination of Queen Min ==
The politically active Queen Min (posthumously styled "Empress Myeongseong") became a focal point for sōshi frustration. According to Orbach, a mix of racism, sexism, and political agendas led to members of the Kanjō shinpō taking the lead in plotting her assassination. Ultimately, the new Japanese emissary Miura Gorō recruited all of the Kanjō shinpō's staff in a plot to kill the queen. They executed the plot on October 8, and were acquitted of all charges in a highly controversial and criticized trial.

The paper later reported on the assassination, and falsely claimed that it had been led by the Korean Heungseon Daewongun, a rival of the Queen's, and executed by the Hullyeondae. Adachi remained as president of the newspaper, and stayed in Japan to run in parliamentary politics. He later became the Minister of Communications. Most of the other plotters returned to Korea and became key voices of the Japanese resident community.

In 1896, fearing for his own safety, King Gojong fled to the Russian legation for protection. The April 19, 1896 issue of the paper contained a children's song that ridiculed Gojong for this, which led to public outrage.

== Later years and end ==
Following the Kanjō shinpō's example, a number of native Korean newspapers began being published. They published nationalist narratives that combatted the pro-Japanese narratives in the Kanjō shinpō. In response, the Japanese government began investing significant funds in Japanese newspapers.

Kikuchi Kenjō (菊池謙讓), one of the assassins of Queen Min and former correspondent of the Kokumin Shimbun, became editor-in-chief of the Kanjō shinpō upon his return to Korea. He became deeply involved in Korean court politics, as he gained the favor of the Heungseon Daewongun. Kikuchi published daily articles that portrayed in graphic detail the brutality of Russian conquest north of Korea, which stoked anti-Russian sentiment in the Korean court. Kikuchi began keeping the Korean Minister of Foreign Affairs, Pak Chesoon, personally up to date on developments there.

Kikuchi was made president of the Kanjō shinpō in 1900. In 1903, the newspaper's headquarters burnt down, and he oversaw its rebuilding with funds from the Japanese legation. That year, the Japanese legation became dissatisfied with Kikuchi's performance, and had him resign. On April 18, 1904, he founded another Japanese newspaper in Korea, Daitō shinpō.

The paper was acquired by the Resident-General of Korea on July 31, 1906. Its final issue was No. 2069. Afterwards, it, the Daitō shinpō, and five other newspapers were merged and became the Keijō Nippō.

== See also ==
- List of newspapers in Korea – List of pre-1945 newspapers, including Japanese
- History of newspapers in Korea
- Korea under Japanese rule
- Category:Japanese-language newspapers published in Korea
