= Korean Newspaper Archive =

South Korean archive of Korean newspapers

- Available in: Korean
- Country of origin: South Korea
- Owner: National Library of Korea
- Services: Newspaper archive
- Website: nl.go.kr/newspaper/index.do (in Korean)
- Commercial: no

The Korean Newspaper Archive (Korean: 대한민국 신문 아카이브; lit. 'Republic of Korea Newspaper Archive') is a South Korean newspaper archive operated by the National Library of Korea (NLK). In recent years, the archive has been digitizing its newspapers, and making both the scans and searchable text available to the public, free of charge. It offers newspapers from the first modern Korean newspaper in 1883 to the 1960s.

From 2013 to 2022, the library invested 11.57 billion won into digitizing 381,010 pages of 99 brands of newspapers. As of February 2024, the newspaper had 99 brands of newspapers containing 8,013,709 articles. Work is being conducted to prepare the transcribed text for use in artificial intelligence applications, as well as to translate the contents of the newspapers into other languages.

The significance of the service in studies on modern Korean history has been noted. The website offers services that allow the linking and comparison of information in papers.

== See also ==
- History of Korean newspapers
- List of newspapers in Korea
