= Keijō shinpō =

1907–1912 Japanese newspaper in Korea

Keijō Shinpō
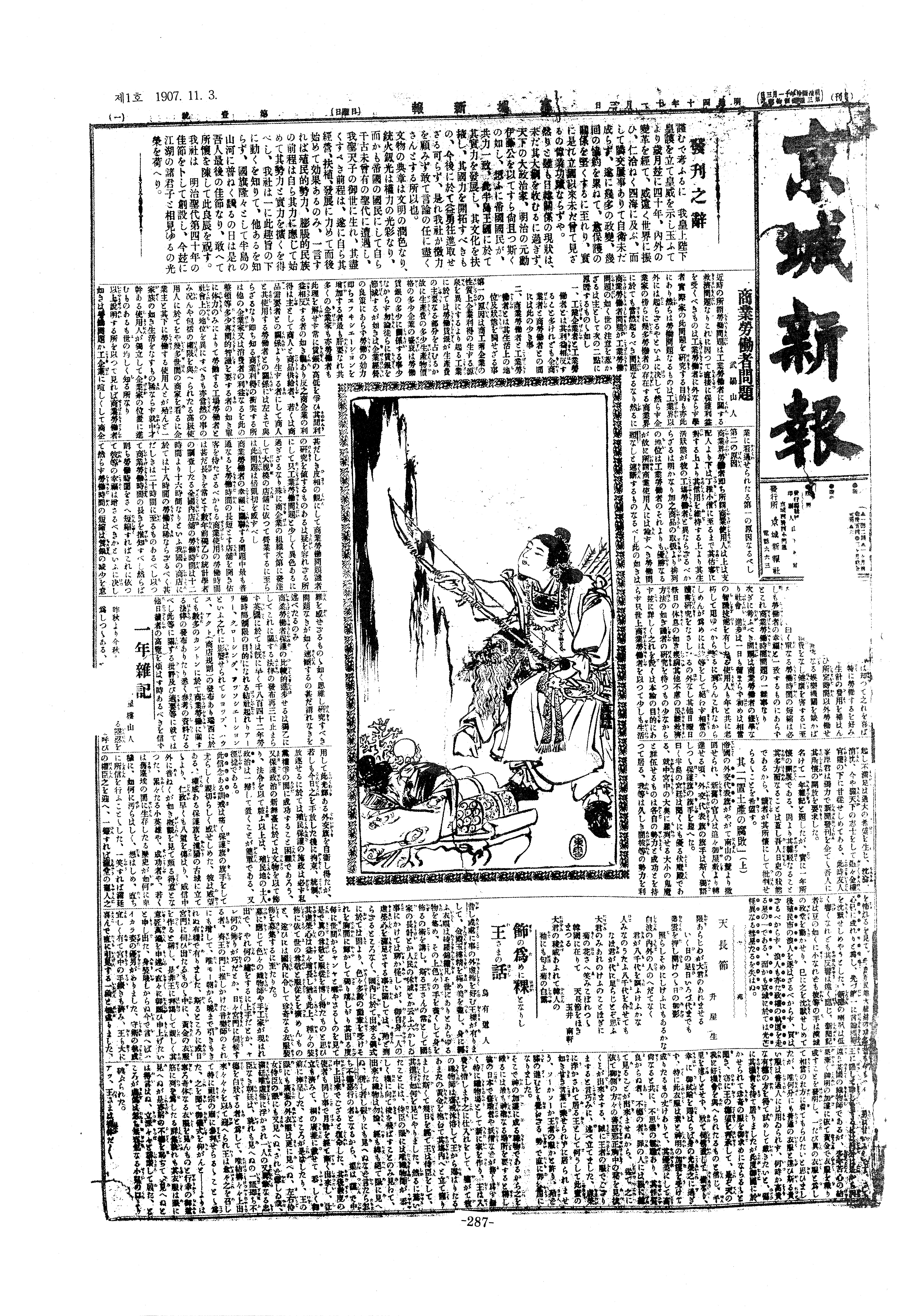
- Cover of the first issue (November 3, 1907)
- Founded: November 3, 1907
- Ceased publication: February 12, 1912
- Language: Japanese
- City: Keijō (Seoul)
- Country: Korean Empire; Korea under Japanese rule

Keijō Shinpō (京城新報; Korean: 경성신보; RR: Gyeongseong sinbo; MR: Kyŏngsŏng sinbo) was a daily Japanese-language newspaper published in Korea from 1907 to 1912. It briefly went by the name Keijō Shinbun (京城新聞; 경성신문; Gyeongseong sinmun; Kyŏngsŏng sinmun) in 1908 before returning to its original name.

== History ==
It published its first issue on November 3, 1907.

The newspaper published articles that were critical towards Japanese policies in Korea. One Japanese scholar described the paper as "Korea's only civilian independent newspaper that dared to style itself as an enemy of the Governor-General's rule". The newspaper's very first issue had an article by journalist Minegishi Shigetarō (峰岸繁太郎) that was critical of the Japanese Resident-General of Korea, Itō Hirobumi. The article described Itō's policies as "weak-kneed". In April 1908, another article by Minegishi described Itō as "unfit to be resident-general". Historian Jun Uchida theorized that this reflected Minegishi's membership of an opposing political faction.

It changed its name to Keijō Shinbun from July 5 to December 23, 1908.

It published its final issue (No. 880) on February 29, 1912.
