= Jeo-dong =

Neighborhood in Seoul, South Korea

- Interactive map of Jeo-dong
- Country: South Korea

Area
  - Total: 0.09 km^{2} (0.035 sq mi)

Korean name
- Hangul: 저동
- Hanja: 苧洞
- RR: Jeo-dong
- MR: Chŏ-dong

Jeo-dong (Korean: 저동) is a legal dong (neighborhood) of Jung District, Seoul, South Korea and governed by its administrative dong, Myeong-dong and Euljiro 3, 4, 5ga-dong.

== See also ==
- Administrative divisions of South Korea
