= Cheguk sinmun =

1898–1910 newspaper in Korea

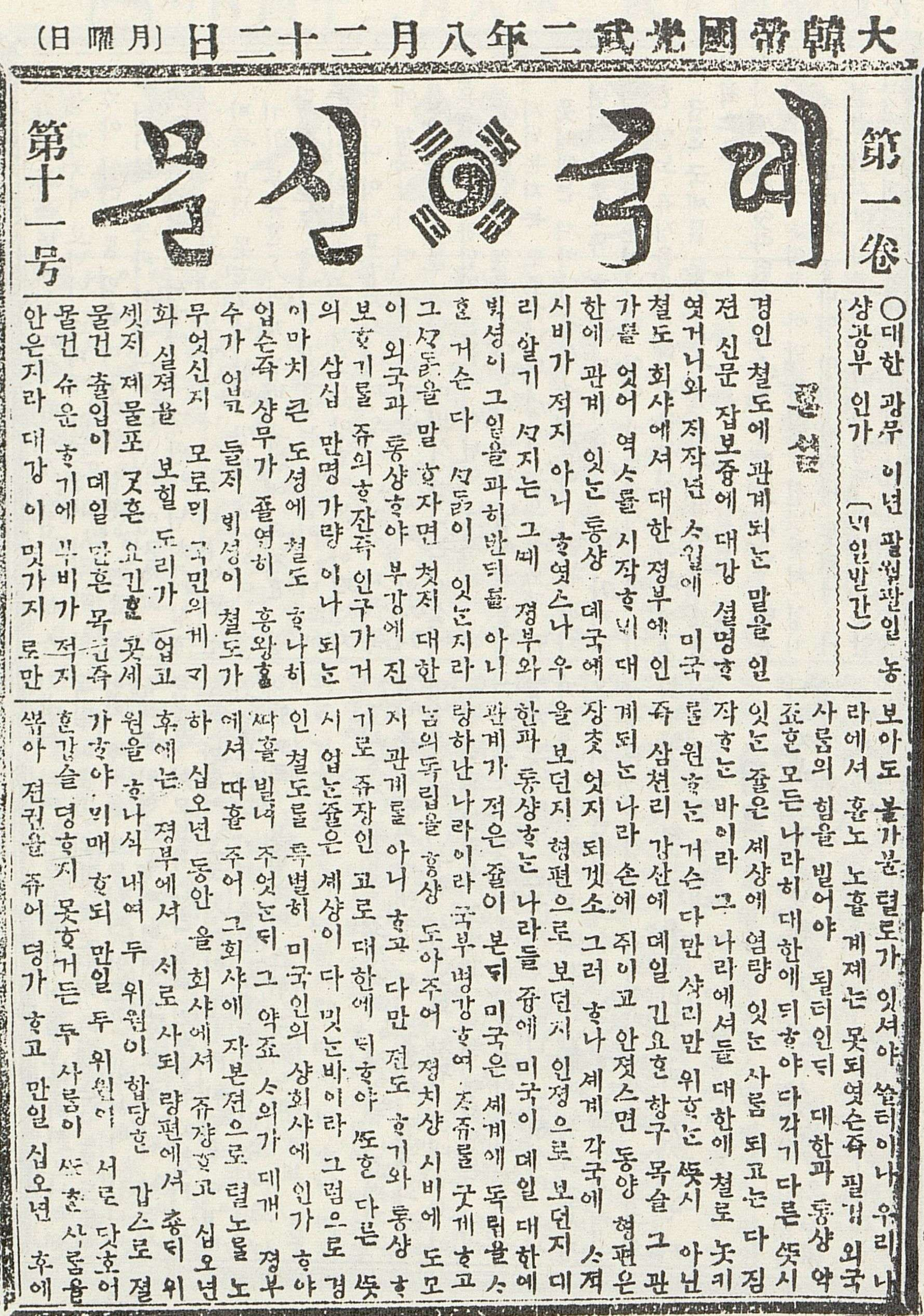
- Cover of August 22, 1898 edition
- Founded: August 8, 1898
- Ceased publication: 1910
- Language: Korean
- City: Seoul
- Country: Joseon, Korean Empire

- Cheguk sinmun
- Hangul: 제국신문; 뎨국신문
- Hanja: 帝國新聞
- Revised Romanization: Jeguk sinmun
- McCune–Reischauer: Cheguk sinmun

Cheguk sinmun (Korean: 뎨국신문; 제국신문; Hanja: 帝國新聞; lit. 'Imperial Post') was a Korean-language newspaper published in the Korean Empire between 1898 and 1910. It founded on August 8, 1898, by Yi Jong-myeon (李鍾冕) and published in Seoul. It was published using the purely vernacular Hangul script and attracted a largely lower or middle class and female readership. It was less political than the other papers of the period, concentrating instead on social issues. One of its early reporters was the young Syngman Rhee.
