= Busan Ilbo =

South Korean newspaper

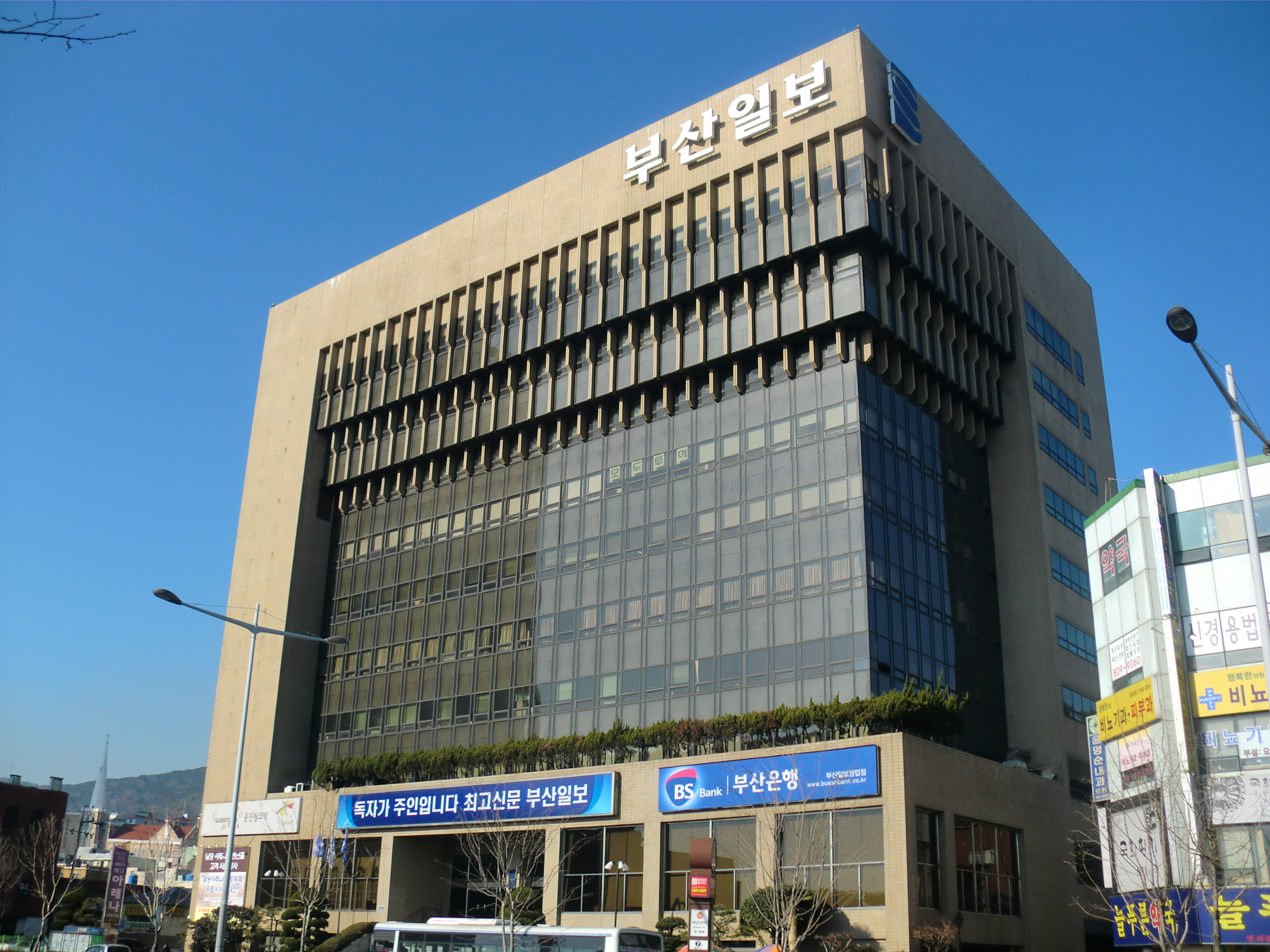
- Busan Ilbo headquarters in Dong-gu, Busan
- Founded: September 10, 1946; 80 years ago
- Language: Korean
- Headquarters: 365 Jungang-daero, Dong-gu, Busan, South Korea

Korean name
- Hangul: 부산일보
- Hanja: 釜山日報
- RR: Busan ilbo
- MR: Pusan ilbo

Busan Ilbo (Korean: 부산일보) is a Korean-language newspaper published in the South Korean city of Busan.

It was founded on September 10, 1946 by Park Soo-hyung, Ha Won-jun, and others.
