= History of newspapers in Korea =

Modern newspapers have been published in Korea since 1881, with the first native Korean newspaper being published in 1883.

== Joseon period ==
=== Chōsen shinpō ===
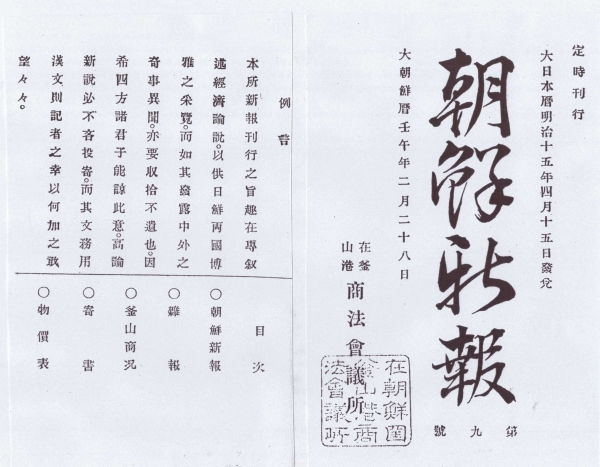
Chōsen shinpō, the first newspaper in Korea (1881)

The history of modern newspapers in Korea begins in the Joseon period, with the publication of the Japanese newspaper Chōsen shinpō on December 10, 1881. It was the first modern newspaper to be published in Korea. Japan's own first newspaper, the 1861 Nagasaki Shipping List and Advertiser, was published in English by an Englishman. Twelve issues of the Chōsen shinpō are known to exist. Its articles are published mostly in Japanese or Classical Chinese (which educated Koreans would have been able to read), but it did have one article that was known to have been published in the Korean script Hangul.

Japanese newspapers went on to have a significant influence in Korean newspaper history. However, after the Chōsen shinpō, new Japanese newspapers did not arise in Korea until around 1890. Scholar Park Yong-gu (박용구) speculates that it may have been because of worsened Japan–Korea ties after the 1882 Imo Incident.

=== Hansŏng sunbo and Hansŏng chubo ===
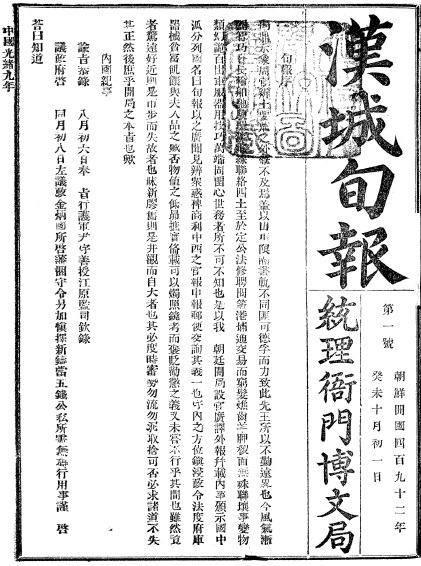
First issue of Hansŏng sunbo (1883)

Korean emissaries visited China and Japan and noticed the proliferation of newspapers there. Park Yung-hyo convinced the Korean monarch Gojong to allow the creation of a Korean newspaper, and brought Japanese printing equipment and advisors to Seoul to create a paper. Hansŏng sunbo was published on October 31, 1883 as the first native Korean newspaper, although it was written in Classical Chinese. Subscriptions were sold to both public servants and private citizens, although likely public servant readers were more common. The newspaper stopped circulating in December 1884, more than a year after its launch, due to the Kapsin Coup. Hansŏng chubo (한성주보; 漢城周報) was founded as a weekly successor paper on January 25, 1886 and was eventually shut down in 1888 due to a lack of government funds.

=== Early Japanese publications in Korea ===
The first private Korean newspaper would not emerge until 1896. Until then, most newspapers published in Korea were Japanese. Japanese traders and settlers began arriving in increasing numbers over time.

Japanese population by year
Year	Busan	Wonsan	Incheon	Seoul
1880	2,066	207	0	0
1885	1,896	235	562	89
1890	2,733	708	1,554	522
1895	4,953	1,362	4,418	1,519

In particular, Incheon's Japanese population saw a notable increase by 1890. Correspondingly, Japanese newspapers began to emerge there for the settlers, with the Jinsen Keijō kakushū shōhō (later called Chōsen shinpō, unrelated to the 1881 publication) being founded there around that time. This and other Japanese papers in the 1890s often primarily wrote on news and statistics about commerce, with current events being a secondary concern.

The 1894–1895 First Sino-Japanese War was a significant period for the few Japanese newspapers in Korea. The Japanese government intervened directly in the affairs of the papers, and even issued an order (No. 134) that newspapers consult authorities before publishing anything potentially controversial about the war. Some papers went on hiatus, potentially due to the war, around this time. In May 1895, the Japanese consulate in Korea received confirmation that it could censor newspapers in Korea like the mainland Japanese government could in Japan.

A notable population among Japanese settlers in Korea were aggressive young men often dubbed sōshi (壮士). In Korea, they had the right of extraterritoriality and could not be punished under Korean law. Many committed violent crimes, and felt emboldened by their status. A number of them settled into careers as journalists, with many having little prior experience in the field. Closely adjacent to this group was Adachi Kenzō, who founded the newspapers Chōsen jihō in Busan in 1894, and Kanjō shinpō in Seoul around 1894 or 1895. The papers were initially popular with Koreans, as they published general and useful information. Their technology and style likely inspired and contributed to the later proliferation of Korean newspapers. However, after Adachi enlisted all of the Kanjō shinpō staff to assassinate the Korean queen in late 1895, sentiment shifted against Adachi's papers and Japan in general. Japanese newspaper began to publish more overtly along Japanese lines, criticizing Korean culture and politicians.

=== Tongnip sinmun ===
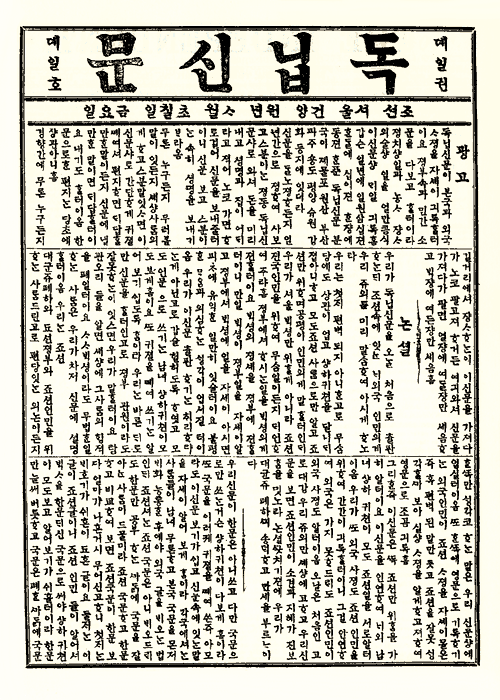
The Tongnip sinmun (1897)

On April 7, 1896, the first private Korean newspaper, Tongnip sinmun, was founded. It was also the first newspaper to publish purely in Hangul, which was revolutionary for the time. It also was a significant early adopter of spaces between words. It published in both Korean and English, with its English name being The Independent. True to its name, it promoted Korean independence activism and promoted reforms in order to prevent Korea's future subjugation.

== Korean Empire period ==
=== Rise of private Korean newspapers ===
More Korean papers soon followed the Tongnip sinmun, with the following being founded in 1898 alone: Kyŏngsŏng Sinmun, Cheguk sinmun, Hyŏpsŏnghoe Hoebo, Hwangsŏng sinmun, and Maeil Sinmun. Around this time, the Tongnip sinmun increased its publication frequency from every other day to daily.

A significant majority of the Korean population was illiterate around this time. In some instances, entire villages shared single subscriptions, and information was relayed orally to others. Furthermore, access to printers, ink, and paper was highly limited; all of this equipment was usually imported to Korea. There were reportedly no major paper mills in Korea in 1905. The Korean government attempted to assist various newspapers by allowing subscription fees to be collected at local government offices.

At the time, Korea had no legislation in place to manage these newspapers. They published critically about foreign interference in Korea, and also criticized the Korean government for falling prey to the interference. For example, in February 1898, the Tongnip sinmun leaked information about the Russian Empire demanding ownership of Busan's Chŏryŏngdo from the Korean government. The emissaries of Russia, France, and Japan protested the leak, and demanded that Gojong enact legislation to regulate Korean newspapers. In October, Gojong issued an order to draft such a law. The Department of Internal Affairs drafted a bill modeled after Japan's 1891 newspaper ordinance. The bill was seen as too harsh, and Korean journalists protested it. The bill never ended up taking effect; formal restrictions on Korean newspapers were only implemented beginning in 1907.

During the 1904–1905 Russo-Japanese War, the Korean press leaked Japanese military movements and secrets on a number of occasions. Japan submitted a number of complaints to Gojong, and the Japanese military threatened to intervene and censor the papers by force. Several newspapers had some of their articles censored. In protest of this, they began to practice what was dubbed "brick wall newspaper" (벽돌신문) tactics, where they printed censored articles backwards.

=== Japanese response ===
The Japanese legation, which had once held significant sway over the Korean media landscape, began making greater efforts to compete. It invested and intervened in the affairs of its existing newspapers, and provided funding for the creation of new papers. In the late 1890s and early 1900s, various Japanese newspapers were founded in major urban centers, including Wonsan, Mokpo, Gunsan, and Daegu. They were rarely published as daily papers, and some of them were published for only small Japanese populations. Park Yong-gu theorizes that their publication was meant to promote community identity and ties, as well as to provide careers for Japanese immigrants.

Upon Japan's victory in the Russo-Japanese War in 1905, Korea was forced to be put under the indirect rule of the Japanese Resident-General of Korea. Resident-general Itō Hirobumi began work on changing the press landscape of Korea, as well as influencing international opinion on Korea's eventual colonization. He set up a network of interlinked media presences in Tokyo, Seoul, and New York City. For English-language press, Itō worked with his Anglo-Irish acquaintance John Russell Kennedy.

Japanese newspapers and population in Korea after indirect rule
Year	# newspapers	Population
1904	11	31,093
1905	14	42,460
1906	27	83,315
1907	34	98,001
1908	32	126,168
1909	34	146,147
1910	28	171,543

Meanwhile, the Japanese population and number of Japanese newspapers in Korea nearly doubled from 1905 to 1906. Newspapers began to be founded for the first time in various Korean cities, with the first newspapers in Jeonju, Masan, and Daejeon being Japanese. By contrast, the only regional Korean-language newspaper that was founded during this period was the Gyeongnam Ilbo.

1910 circulation numbers for regional Japanese newspapers
Location	Newspaper name	Circulation
Incheon	Chōsen Shinpō	8,529
Daejeon	Sannan shinpō	360
Busan	Chōsen jihō	2,412
Busan	Fuzan nippō	2,400
Masan	Masan shinpō	841
Daegu	Taikyū shinbun	1,150
Gwangju	Kōshū shinpō	514
Mokpo	Moppo shinpō	732
Jeonju	Zenshū shinpō	480
Gunsan	Genzan nippō	649
Pyongyang	Heijō nippō	852
Pyongyang	Heijō shinbun	833
Chinnamp'o	Chinnanpo shinpō	750
Sinuiju	Ōkō nippō	485
Wonsan	Genzan mainichi shinbun	1,556
Hamhung	Minyū shinbun	946
Chongjin	Kitakan shinbun	1,567

In several cities, even those with smaller markets, multiple Japanese newspapers formed, which led to competition between them. Several regional newspapers were acquired, merged, or split off from each other over the course of the 1900s. They mostly published in Japanese, although several of them published some articles in Korean. Historian Park Yong-gu notes that this was primarily done to profit from the Korean market as well, although some articles did attempt to justify Japan's takeover of Korea. However, Park also argues that the proliferation of Korean-language articles in Japanese papers possibly negatively impacted the creation of native Korean newspapers. In Daegu in 1906, the Korean publisher Kwangmunsa received permission to create a newspaper, but never ended up doing so. This was possibly because the local Japanese paper began publishing articles in Korean around this time, which may have decreased demand for a new Korean newspaper.

Park points out that the local Japanese newspapers were sometimes troublesome for Japanese government; in several instances, newspapers were suspended or closed because they published pieces critical of the government, and regulations were increasingly applied to their management.

Punishments towards Japanese newspapers by the resident-general
Name	Date	Punishment	Notes
Taikyū nippō	December 1906	Publication suspended	Published a critical article
Taikyū nichi nichi shinbun	February 1907	Extradited to Japan (퇴한령; 退韓令)	
Taikyū nichi nichi shinbun	April 10, 1908	Extradited to Japan (퇴한령; 退韓令)	Suspended for two years afterwards
Chōsen Times	April 17, 1908	Publication suspended	For a critical article, lifted on April 23
Chōsen Times	May 23, 1908	Sales suspended	
Fuzan nippō	May 26, 1908	Sales suspended	
Chōsen Times	October 3, 1908	Sales suspended	Revealed Japanese troop movements
Chōsen shinpō	October 3, 1908	Sales suspended	Revealed Japanese troop movements
Moppo shinpō	March 3, 1910	Sales suspended	For disturbing governance
Heijō nippō	April 1910	Sales suspended	
Heijō nippō	June 12, 1910	Sales suspended	For an article about Japan's takeover of Korea
Fuzan nippō	August 5, 1910	Publication suspended	For an article about current events
Chōsen shinpō	August 5, 1910	Publication suspended	
Chōsen shinbun	August 10, 1910	Sales suspended	For disturbing governance, lifted on August 12.
Heijō nippō	August 11, 1910	Sales suspended, publication suspended	For disturbing governance, lifted on August 14.
Heijō shinbun	August 26, 1910	Publication suspended, sales suspended	For disturbing governance, lifted on August 27.

The Japanese resident-general continued financially supporting various Japanese newspapers in Korea, although Park Yong-gu was uncertain about when this practice stopped. Park theorized that, over time, the need for support decreased, as Japanese newspapers attracted more readers and advertisers.

=== The Korea Daily News and newspaper censorship ===
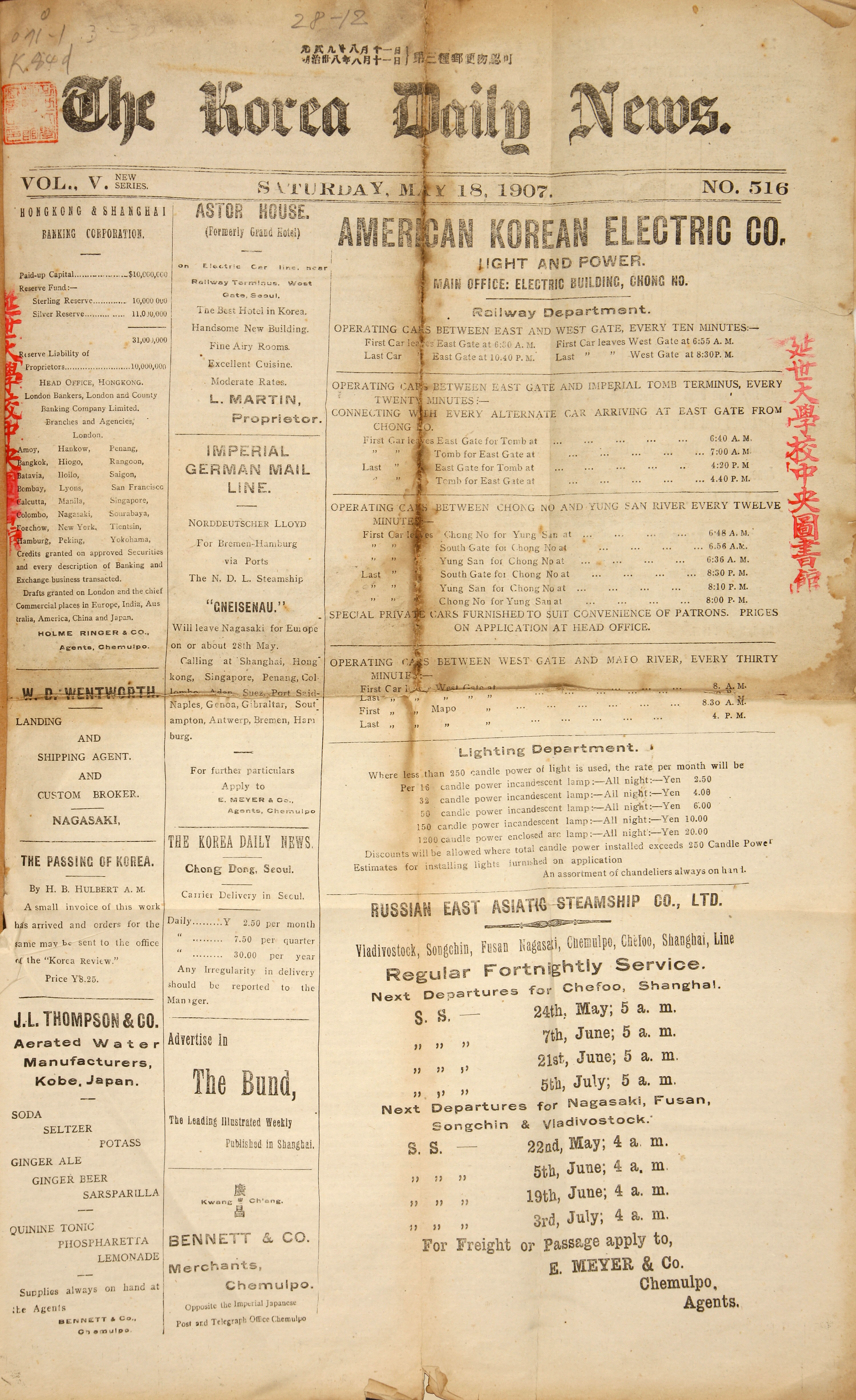
The Korea Daily News (May 18, 1907 edition)

The Korea Daily News was an English-language newspaper published in the Korean Empire between 1904 and 1910. It had two companion Korean-language editions published in mixed script and pure Hangul called Taehan Maeil Sinbo. It is the first predecessor to modern Seoul Shinmun, which is the oldest running daily newspaper in South Korea.

The newspaper is remembered as a hub of the Korean independence movement around that time. The newspaper's owner, British journalist Thomas Bethell, dodged Japanese censorship using his foreign citizenship, and sharply criticized Japan. He worked alongside notable Korean independence activists, especially Yang Gi-tak.

Japan moved to stifle the publication. In January 1906, press secretary Zumoto Motosada purchased the English-language The Seoul Press on behalf of the resident-general, and used it to directly counter Bethell's paper. Furthermore, in 1906, the Japanese resident-general purchased and centralized several Japanese newspapers, including the Kanjō Shinpō and Daitō Shinpō, which resulted in the creation of the Keijō Nippō. This newspaper became the de facto publication of the Japanese resident-general and later governor-general, and held a position of prominence in Korea until its dissolution in 1945. The Japanese resident-general also passed two significant pieces of legislation in Korea to hamper the Korean press. The first was the Newspaper Law (新聞紙法; 신문지법) of 1907, then came the Publication Law (出版法; 출판법) of 1909. These laws were eventually abolished years after the liberation of Korea: on March 19, 1952.

Issues of Korean-language newspapers were prohibited and confiscated in significant numbers around this time. According to a 1909 Japanese resident-general report, they had confiscated a total of 20,947 issues of various newspapers, even those published abroad in Russia and the United States, by that point.

By request from the Japanese resident-general, the British consulate arrested and tried Bethell twice for his reporting. He was eventually found innocent, although the stress from his legal troubles possibly caused his early death in 1909 from a heart issue. The paper was subsequently sold, and by 1910 it became an organ of the Japanese government called Maeil Sinbo.

=== Gyeongnam Ilbo ===
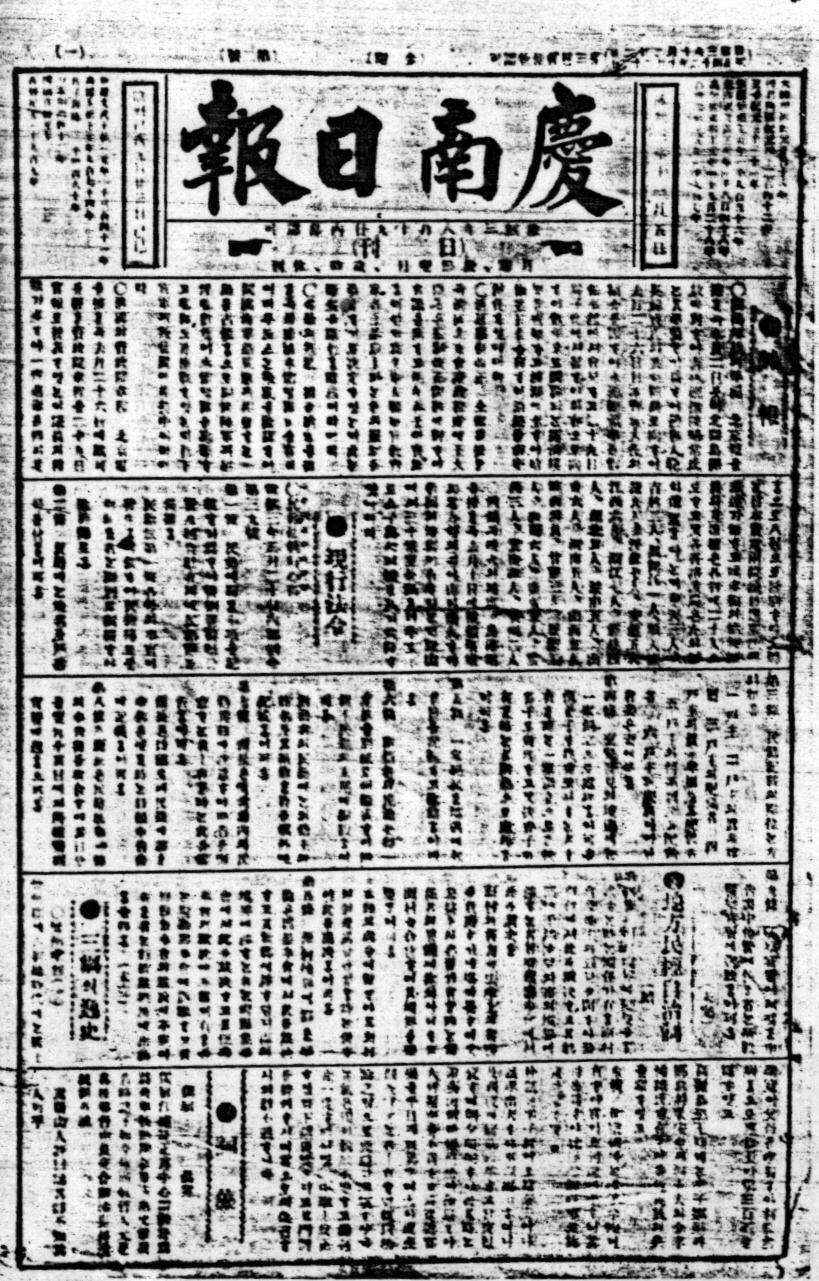
Cover of the first issue of the Gyeongnam Ilbo, now a Tangible Cultural Heritage of South Gyeongsang Province.

Gyeongnam Ilbo was the first ever, and only regional Korean-language newspaper founded during this period. It was also the first newspaper in Jinju. It was founded on October 15, 1909. Its company was also the first publicly-owned Korean press company. The newspaper's founding was hailed by other Korean and even Japanese and Chinese newspapers. It published critically about Japan until the beginning of the colonial period. It was then censored and suppressed, with increasing financial and political pressure applied to its staff. It eventually halted publication in January 1915, although the newspaper eventually restarted twice after the liberation of Korea, and still persists to this day.

== Japanese colonial period ==
From 1910 until the 1919 March First Movement, few Korean-language publications were allowed in Korea. According to an article in the Encyclopedia of Korean Culture, this period can be considered a "dark age" for the Korean-language press. Only two Korean-language papers were allowed, the Maeil Sinbo and the Gyeongnam Ilbo, and the latter was pressured to close by 1914.

South Korean historian Kang Jun-man (강준만) noted the disparity between the ratio of Japanese publications and readers vs. Korean publications and readers in 1910. At least 20 Japanese-language publications were published for around 158,000 Japanese people, compared to just two for 12.36 million Koreans.

=== The March First Movement and native Korean newspapers ===
In January 1919, the Korean monarch Gojong suddenly died. Rumors emerged that Gojong had been poisoned by Japan, and the Korean population was outraged. They launched a peaceful protest in which they advocated for independence. Millions protested across the country. However, the protests were violently suppressed by the Japanese authorities, resulting in numerous deaths and arrests. The movement invigorated the Korean independence movement, and around 29 underground Korean nationalist newspapers were founded in Korea soon afterwards.

In response to the protests, the Japanese colonial government changed many of its policies, and eased restrictions on Korean newspapers. Three Korean-language newspapers were approved for publication in 1920: The Chosun Ilbo, The Dong-A Ilbo, and the pro-Japanese publication Sisa Ch'ongbo, although the last of which closed the following year. Shidae Ilbo was founded by Choe Nam-seon in 1924; by 1936 this went by the name JoongAng Ilbo. These three Korean-language papers went on to be significant during the colonial period, and were seen as a center for writers and literature.

However, Japanese-language newspapers still held a position of prominence in Korea. From 1929 to 1939, the number of Japanese-language newspapers with a circulation of over 500 increased from 11 with a total of 102,707 copies to 17 with a total of 195,767 copies. Koreans began subscribing to the papers in increasing numbers; during that same period, the circulation for Korean subscribers to those papers increased around seven-fold (5,062 to 36,391).

=== One Province, One Company and prohibitions ===
WIth the beginning of the Pacific War, the Japanese government made sweeping changes in both Japan and Korea. Beginning in January 1940, it executed a policy towards newspapers that has been dubbed "One Province, One Company" (1道1社; 1도 1사) or "One Province, One Paper" (1道1紙; 1도 1지). Under this policy, both Japanese- and Korean-language newspapers were merged or closed. Chōsen Jihō was merged into the Fuzan nippō, and Chōsen shinbun was merged into the Keijō nippō.

Japanese-language newspapers by location after the 1940–1941 mergers
Area	Newspaper
	Keijō nippō
	Chōsen shōkō shinbun
Chūseinan-dō	Chūsen nippō
Zenranan-dō	Zennan shinpō
Zenrahoku-dō	Zenhoku shinpō
Busan	Fuzan nippō
Daegu	Taikyū nichi nichi shinbun
Pyongyang	Heijō nichi nichi shinbun
Heianhoku-dō	Ōkō nippō
Kōkai-dō	Kōkai Nippo
Kōgen-dō	Hokusen nichi nichi shinbun
Kankyōhoku-dō	Seishin nippō

The major Korean-owned newspapers, The Chosun Ilbo and The Dong-A Ilbo were shut down around this time. Kang Jun-man argued that this was done out of an abundance of caution and to accelerate Korea's assimilation.

The One Province, One Company policy, as well as increasing restrictions on the learning and use of the Korean language, contributed to significant consolidation in the newspaper market. The only major daily Korean-language newspaper that was allowed to continue publishing was the Maeil sinbo, and it came to financially thrive. Korean readers subscribed to Japanese newspapers in increasing numbers, with the Keijō shinpō reportedly coming to have around 60% Korean subscribers during this period.

=== End of the war and the colonial period ===
Despite the tide of World War II turning against Japan, newspapers in Korea attempted to highlight Japan's victories. Paper shortages began to affect newspapers, and many of them reduced their sizes and page counts. Fewer and fewer advertisements were published; some of the last remaining advertisements were often for the theater or for medical treatments.

On August 6, the first atomic bomb was dropped on Hiroshima. The Maeil Sinmun and Keijō Nippō mentioned the bombing on the August 8 edition, but did not prominently mention it or describe it in detail. One such headline read: "Enemy uses 'new bomb', causes significant damage to Hiroshima". (Note: 적(敵) 신형 폭탄 사용/ 광도시(廣島市)에 상당한 피해) Around this time, the Japanese government prevented the press from using the term "atomic bomb" (原子爆弾; 원자폭탄). The following day, the Maeil Sinmun announced that the Korean prince Yi U had died "in battle"; in actuality he had been killed while commuting to work during the atomic bombing. At 12 p.m. on the 15th, the announcement of Japan's surrender was broadcast on the radio. The Maeil Sinmun and Keijō Nippō already had articles written and prepared for the announcement of the surrender. They were informed the evening before of the announcement, and published their articles soon afterwards.

== 1945–1960: Korean independence ==
Since Korea's independence from Japan's rule, numerous periodicals, including newspapers and magazines, have emerged in response to media oppression.

The media was divided into left and right wing factions.

=== Left-right confrontational press ===
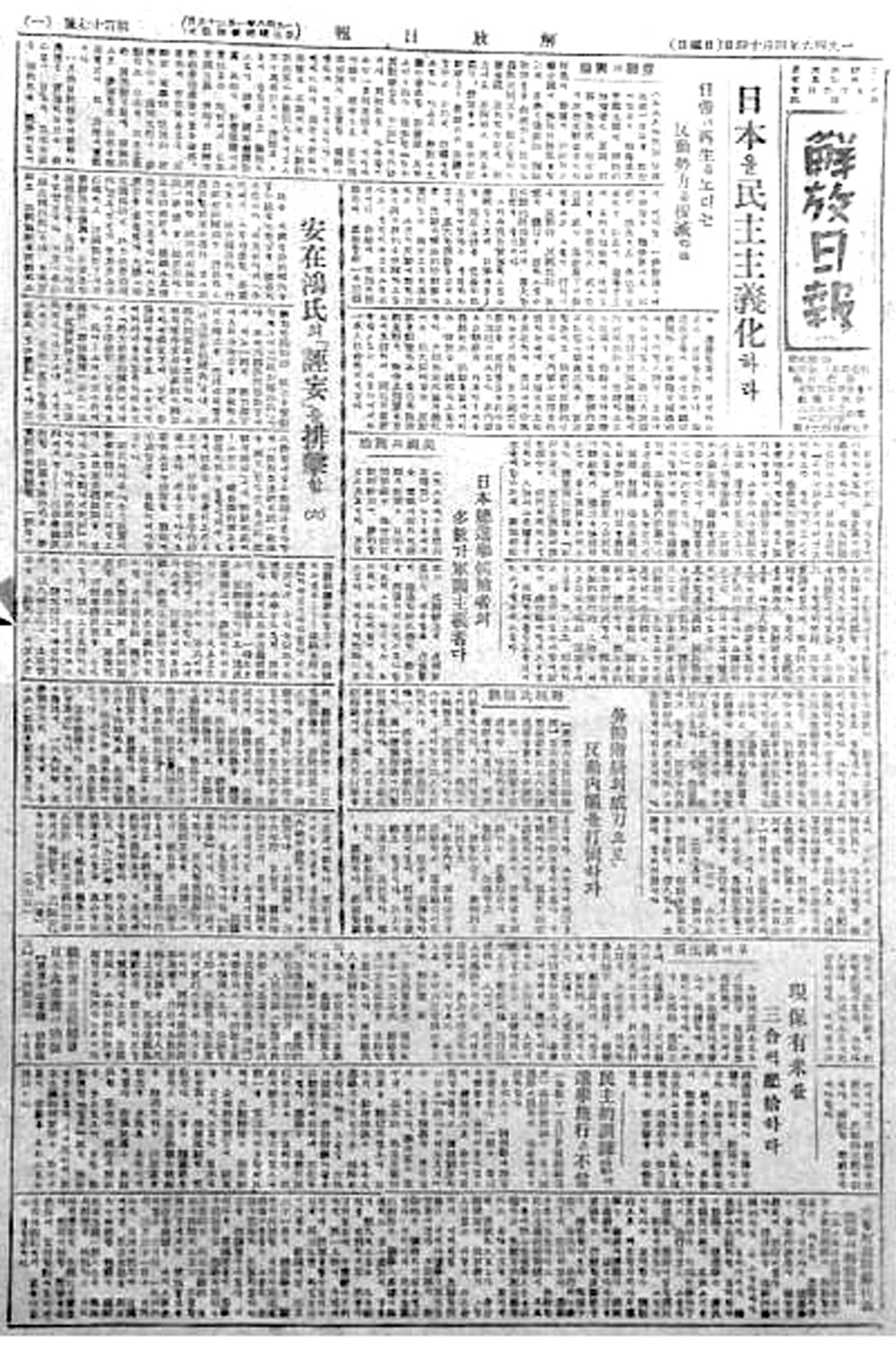
Liberation Daily

The left-wing group took the lead in the press by first taking control of the facilities for printing newspapers. The leading left-wing newspapers were The Chosun Ilbo and the Liberation Daily.

Founded on September 8, 1945, The Chosun Ilbo was founded by Korean employees working in the Keijō Nippō, which was first published by Kim Jeong-do, but in late October, Hong Jeung-sik, a prominent figure in the left-wing media community, changed to editor-in-chief and publisher.

The number of printing facilities immediately after Korea's liberation from Japanese rule was very small as most of them belonged to the Japanese. The Communist Party of Korea not only received the Gonozawa Printing Office in Sogong-dong, Seoul, which was the best facility at the time, but also recruited the publishing labor union.

The Chosun Ilbo was the first daily newspaper in Seoul after the August 15 Liberation, and on September 8, left-wing reporters from the Keijō Nippō, the official newspaper of the Japanese Government-General of Korea, were founded as tabloid Korean newspapers.

The Liberation Daily was founded in 1945 by the Central Committee of the Communist Party of Korea in Seoul.

== 1960–1980: Military government ==
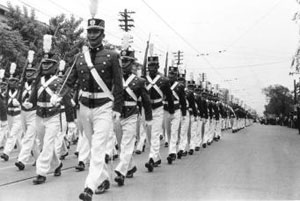
The military government

After May 16, 1961, the military government conducted a complete overhaul of newspapers and news agencies. A year later, the military government strongly pushed ahead with its media policy to reform the structure of the media, announcing a 25-point "press policy" and "press policy implementation standards". The Dong-A and Chosun incident occurred due to the intervention of government authorities, the press freedom protection movement, the suppression of advertisements, and labor-management conflicts.

=== Incidents ===
On the surface, it was a conflict between the reporters and management of the two leading newspapers, Dong-A Ilbo and Chosun Ilbo. However, the incidents revealed problems faced by the media, such as the dismissal of a large number of journalists in the 1970s, as well as the discord between journalists and business owners.

==== Dong-A Ilbo incident ====
The incident started directly with the union formation of reporters. On March 7, 1974, 33 reporters from the Dong-A Ilbo formed the Dong-A Ilbo Branch of the National Publishing Workers' Union. However, the company began to fire the reporters that supported Dong-A Ilbo's traditional policy of not recognizing labor unions. In protest, the union filed a lawsuit, which led to conflicts and more complex legal battles. In the midst of such labor-management conflicts, the Dong-A Ilbo dismissed and suspended reporters between March 10 and April 1975, forcing 134 reporters, producers, and announcers to leave the company.

==== The Chosun Ilbo incident ====
At the same time, The Chosun Ilbo dismissed two journalists for "infringing their editorial rights". 58 journalists were then later dismissed or suspended indefinitely by the end of March 1975 due to worsening conflicts between management and reporters, with 33 reporters dismissed as they canceled disciplinary action.

=== Media integration and abandoned incident ===
In 1980, the consolidation of newspapers, broadcasting, and telecommunications had all taken place under the leadership of the new military. Jun Doo-hwan's forces, which seized power due to the December 12 incident, established a press team led by Lee Sang-jae at the intelligence office of the security company in early 1980, merged media companies to control the media essential to the power struggle, and dismissed journalists who were resistant or critical of the military's position. The reason for the merger was that media companies became insolvent and a hotbed of corruption due to the turmoil of the media organizations. The voluntary closure or consolidation was a formality that was led by the New Military Department's security division. The new military, including Jun, was found to be part of a ruling scenario in which the government forcibly merged media outlets such as newspapers, broadcasters, and news agencies under the guise of improving the structure of the media to complete the rebellion of the new military forces.
