= Haejo sinmun =

1908 Korean-language newspaper in Russia

Haejo Sinmun
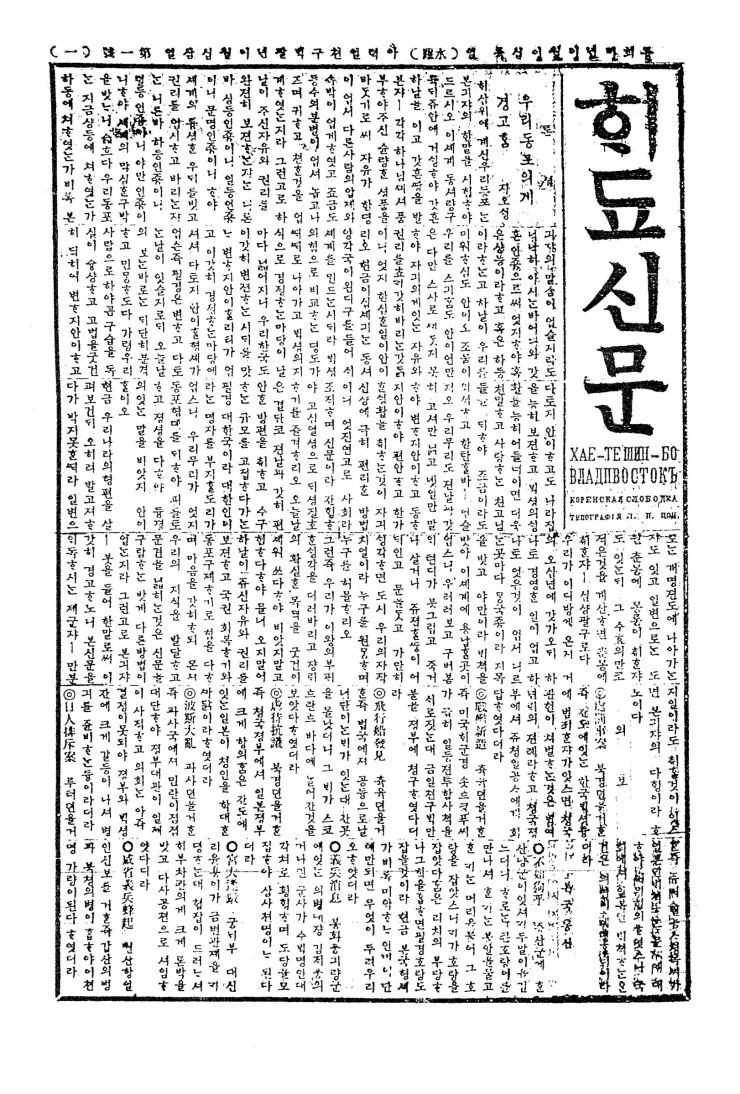
- Cover of the February 26, 1908 first issue. The text is written almost entirely in the Korean script Hangul, with some Cyrillic and Hanja.
- President: Ch'oe Pong-jun
- Editor: Wang Chang-dong
- Founded: February 26, 1908
- Language: Korean (Hangul)
- Ceased publication: May 26, 1908
- City: Vladivostok
- Country: Russian Empire
- Circulation: 400–500

Haejo Sinmun (Note: (Korean: ᄒᆡ됴신문; 해조신문; 해죠신문; 해됴신문; Hanja: 海潮新聞; 海朝新聞; Russian: Хае-те Шин-бо; Хаете Шинбо; Хэчон синмун; Хячжо синмун; Хяджо синмун)) was a daily Korean-language newspaper published in the Korean enclave Sinhanch'on, Vladivostok, Russian Empire in 1908. It was the first Korean-language daily newspaper published in Russia.

It was the first of a series of Korean-language newspapers produced in Vladivostok that promoted the Korean independence movement. It was followed by the 1908–1910 Taedong kongbo, 1911 Taeyangbo, and 1912–1914 Kwŏnŏp sinmun.

== History ==
Beginning in the late 19th century, Koreans began migrating out of Korea and into the Russian Far East in search of economic opportunity. These Koreans and their descendents are now known as Koryo-saram. The area became a hotbed for the Korean independence movement, especially against Japan's encroachments into Korean sovereignty.

The newspaper was initially organized by Chŏng Sunman (정순만; 鄭淳萬) and financed by Ch'oe Pongjun (최봉준; 崔鳳俊). It was initially meant for the Korean community that had developed in Vladivostok. Ch'oe served as the president and Wang Chang-dong (왕창동; 王昌東) as its editor. Its head writer was famous Korean independence activist Shin Chae-ho. They invited Korean independence activist Chang Chiyŏn to come write for the paper after Japanese pressure caused him to leave the mainland Korean newspaper Hwangsŏng sinmun.

It published its first issue on February 26, 1908. Each issue consisted of four pages, with 6 rows on each page that each contained 36 columns. The newspaper's circulation was around 400 to 500 copies. The first page of each issue contained editorials, and the other pages containing a mix of other domestic and foreign reports. The third page sometimes contained literature and educational articles. The fourth page contained remaining articles and advertisements.

They distributed copies of the newspaper not only in Russia, but also in Manchuria and in the Korean cities of Seoul, Wonsan, Incheon, Kaesong, and Pyongyang. Copies would be sent to Wonsan by boat, then distributed from there. The newspaper was allied with the Korean newspaper Taehan Maeil Sinbo, which assisted its distribution around the country.

The articles discussed domestic and international news, and happenings in the Korean community. The newspaper was a staunch advocate of the Korean independence movement, which advocated for Korea's independent sovereignty, particularly from Japan. In response, the Japanese Resident-General of Korea, which assumed indirect rule over Korea in 1905, revised the 1907 Newspaper Law (新聞紙法), which had restricted the distribution of domestic Korean newspapers, in the following April in order to also restrict the distribution of international Korean newspapers. Around 1,569 copies were reportedly confiscated, and the Japanese government also applied pressure to close the newspaper altogether. Under this pressure, they finally closed on May 26, 1908, with their 75th issue.

Its equipment and facilities were then taken over by the Taedong kongbo, which began publication on November 18, 1908.

== See also ==
- Koryo Ilbo – a Koryo-saram newspaper founded in 1923 that still publishes today
- List of newspapers in Korea – list of newspapers in Korea before 1945
- History of newspapers in Korea
