= Maeil =

Maeil or Mae-il (매일; 每日) is a Korean word meaning "every day". It may refer to:

- Kyongbuk Maeil Shinmun, South Korean newspaper based in Pohang
- Maeil Business Newspaper, South Korean newspaper based in Seoul
- Maeil Dairies, a South Korean dairy company
- Daehan Maeil Sinmun, the former name of the Seoul Sinmun, South Korean newspaper based in Seoul
- Maeil Sinbo, a 1910 to 1945 Korean-language newspaper published under Japanese rule
