= Taeyangbo =

1911 Korean-language newspaper in Russia

- Founded: June 1, 1911
- Political alignment: Korean independence movement
- Language: Korean (Hangul)
- Ceased publication: September 17, 1911
- City: Vladivostok
- Country: Russian Empire

Taeyangbo (Korean: 대양보; Hanja: 大洋報; RR: Daeyangbo; lit. Ocean Gazette; Russian: Дэянгбо) was a Korean-language newspaper published in Sinhanch'on, Vladivostok, Russian Empire in 1911. It was written entirely in the native Korean script Hangul.

It was one of a series of newspapers that was founded by Koreans in Vladivostok, and was preceded by the 1908 Haejo sinmun and 1908–1910 Taedong kongbo. It was followed by the 1912–1914 Kwŏnŏp sinmun.

According to a 2016 article, no original copies are known to exist. There are, however, Japanese-language translations of some issues that have been retranslated into Korean. Issues No. 3 to 13 (July 6, 1911 to September 11, 1911), excluding No. 9, are attested to.

== History ==
Since the late 19th century, Koreans moved into the Russian Far East in search of economic opportunities. From then until 1910, Japan moved to consolidate its control over and eventually colonize Korea. Vladivostok became a center for the Korean independence movement and independence activists in exile. The newspaper's predecessors were staunch advocates of the movement, and were both forced to close under Japanese pressure.

The founders of the newspaper repeatedly petitioned Vladivostok for permission to start a new newspaper. These requests went mostly ignored. However, one request was finally approved on May 5, 1911.

Taeyangbo published its first issue on June 1. It published twice weekly, on Sundays and Thursdays. It employed as its head writer the Korean independence activist and historian Shin Chae-ho. Shin had previously written for the Hwangsŏng sinmun and Taehan Maeil Sinbo by this point. Its editor-in-chief was Kim Hagu. Their publisher had previously worked on the Taedong kongbo. They printed each issue in a building that was part library and part printing office, and used an elementary school

It was founded by a Korean youth organization called Ch'ŏngnyŏn Kŭnŏphoe (청년근업회; 靑年勤業會). On July 16, 1911, the youth organization was merged into the larger Korean organization Gwoneophoe, which provided financing for the newspaper.

On September 17, 1911, during the midst of an internal dispute in Gwoneophoe, around 15,000 pieces of movable type used to publish the newspaper were stolen by the pro-Japanese Korean spy Ŏm Insŏp. This was done by request of Kitō Katsumi (木藤克己), who was working in the Japanese legation in Vladivostok. This was a significant financial blow to the company, and it stopped printing. It was succeeded by Kwŏnŏp sinmun on May 5, 1912.

== Content ==
The topics in the paper were organized similarly to those in its predecessor, Taedong Kongbo. Its first issue had editorials, essays, domestic affairs (Russia), foreign affairs, international communications, news from Korea, and other topics. It published critically about Japan, and published a special edition on August 29, the anniversary of Korea's annexation. It normally printed around 300 copies per issue, but for that it printed 1,400, and distributed them free of charge.
