= Seoul Shinmun =

Korean-language daily newspaper in South Korea

- Current headquarters (2019)
- Type: Daily newspaper
- Format: Broadsheet
- Owner(s): Seoul Newspaper Co., Ltd.
- Founder(s): Ernest Bethell, Yang Gi-tak
- Founded: 29 June 1904 (as Korea Times)
- Relaunched: 30 August 1910 (Maeil sinbo); 23 November 1945 (current name)
- Language: Korean
- Headquarters: Seoul, South Korea
- Circulation: 780,000
- Website: www.seoul.co.kr

Korean name
- Hangul: 서울신문
- Hanja: 서울新聞
- Lit.: Seoul Newspaper
- RR: Seoul sinmun
- MR: Sŏul sinmun

Seoul Shinmun (Korean: 서울신문; lit. Seoul Newspaper) is a Korean-language daily newspaper published in South Korea.

The newspaper claims descendency from a newspaper established by Englishman Ernest Bethell in Korea on 29 June 1904 called The Korea Daily News (Taehan maeil sinbo); per this claim, Seoul Shinmun would be the oldest active newspaper in South Korea. It published in both English and Korean, and soon became significantly influential due to its ability to publish critically about the Japanese government, which was rapidly encroaching on Korean sovereignty at the time. However, mounting pressure caused it to be sold in 1910. It renamed to Maeil sinbo, and largely published along Japanese colonial government lines. After the liberation of Korea, the newspaper was seized by the United States Army Military Government in Korea in November 1945 and reorganized as Seoul Shinmun. The paper continued under this name, although it briefly published under the name Jinjung Shinmun during the Korean War and for several years afterwards.

Circulation is an estimated 780,000 issues a day.

== History ==
=== Korea Times and The Korea Daily News ===
In 1904, British journalists Ernest Bethell and Thomas Cowen were sent to Korea to report for the British newspaper Daily Chronicle. This was during a time when the Japanese government was rapidly encroaching on Korea's sovereignty. After being fired from the paper, Bethell and Cowen began planning to publish their own paper tentatively called the Korea Times. The pair, along with Korean independence activist Yang Gi-tak, published the first English-only issue of Korea Times on 29 June 1904. The first non-trial issue under the new name was published on 18 July 1904, and was concurrently published in Korean as Taehan maeil sinbo (대한매일신보; 大韓每日申報). Newspapers were then censored by the Japanese Resident-General of Korea. Bethell, as a British citizen, was able to dodge Japanese censorship and continue publishing newspapers. However, he was frequently harassed by the Japanese. Bethell was arrested and tried by the British twice, by request of the Japanese government. He transferred ownership of the paper to his assistant editor Arthur Marnham, who carried on reporting critically of Japan.

=== Maeil sinbo ===
On 21 May 1910, Marnham folded under joint British and Japanese pressure, secretly sold the newspaper, and left the country. Yang and others resigned and denounced the paper publicly as a propaganda piece. The paper became strictly controlled by Japan. It changed its name to Maeil sinbo (매일신보; 每日申報) on 30 August 1910, and became subordinated to the Japanese-language paper Keijō nippō. On 29 April 1938, it became independent from the Keijō and changed a character in its name (申 to 新; both are homophones in Korean).

=== Seoul Shinmun ===
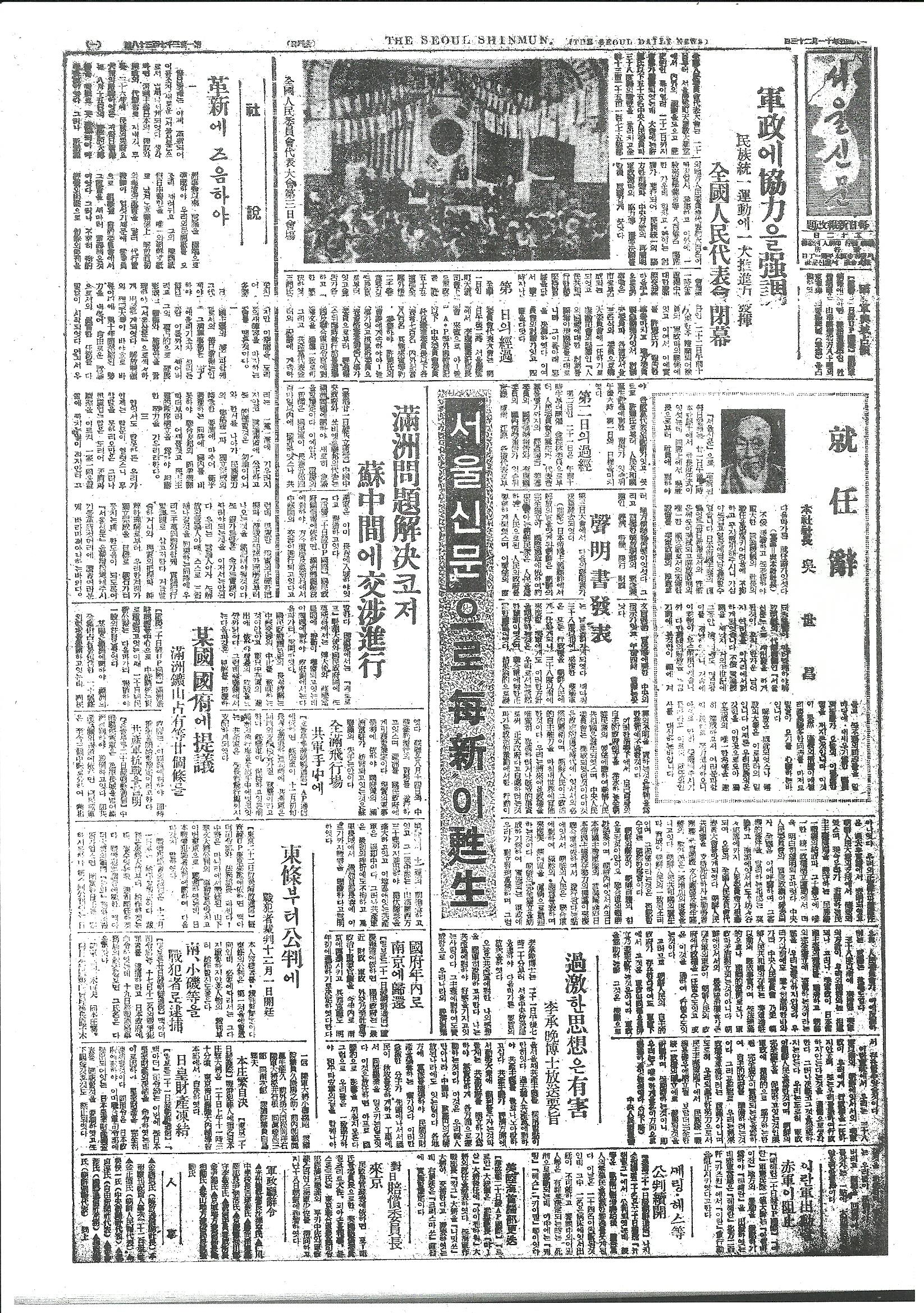
Cover of the first issue of Seoul Shinmun (23 November 1945)

Korea was liberated in August 1945. The Maeil sinbo chairman Lee Seong-geun (이성근) resigned, and the employees took over operation of the paper. The U.S. military arrived on 2 October 1945, and took control of it. However, it faced pushback from the employees, resulting in the paper being suspended in 10 November 1945. It was reorganized and resumed publication on 23 November 1945 as Seoul Shinmun. Its first president was independence activist O Se-chang, who had participated in the 1919 March 1st Movement protests against Japanese rule.

In 15 August 1949, the paper and others were restricted to only four pages per issue. The paper's publication froze during the Korean War. A two-page successor paper, called Jinjung Shinmun (진중신문; 陣中新聞) began publication in April 1951, and was the only operating newspaper service in the city at the time. Its facilities were once destroyed, but were rebuilt, and the paper continued publishing.

On 18 October 1956, the paper named its pure Hangul edition of the Seoul Shinmun. It was mostly a transliteration of the mixed-script main paper, and ceased publication within a year.

On 23 March 1959, it changed its numbering system to effectively cut out the Maeil sinbo portion of its history, by making its first Seoul Shinmun issue as No. 1, instead of its previous numbering No. 13738. During the 1960 April Revolution, a fire occurred in the building, and many of its rare records and materials were lost. The paper encountered then financial difficulties, and took a hiatus beginning on 9 May of the following year. However, after the May 16 coup of 1961, it began receiving support from the government, and resumed publication on 22 December of that year, publishing 36 pages per week in the evenings.

From 2 December 1980, it began publishing in the morning again. It began using computerized typesetting in January 1985, and moved to a larger office at Taepyeongno, Jung District, Seoul. It changed to horizontal type in October 1996.

On 11 November 1998 it restored the former name The Korea Daily News, but after a discussion during an extraordinary meeting to shareholders on 3 December 2003, it decided to revert back to Seoul Shinmun, and took effect on 1 January 2004.

On 8 October 2021, Hoban Group became its largest shareholder.

== Other publications ==
Seoul Shinmun introduced numerous sister magazines and newspapers throughout its history, including:

- Sincheonji (신천지; 新天地), a monthly magazine that covered various topics including current event, culture, and the arts. From February 1946, it published 68 issues over 9 years.
- Jugan Seoul (주간 서울; 週刊 서울), the country's first weekly magazine. It was originally founded by Hapdong News Agency on 7 July 1947, later it was take over by Seoul Shinmun, and reintroduced on 18 October 1948, it published 93 issues until the outbreak of Korean War.
- Sunday Seoul (선데이 서울), a weekly magazine that focus on popular culture. Founded on 33 September 1968, it became soon popular since the first issue, and contributed to the paper's growth. It was ended up on 31 December 1991 with the final issue No. 1192.
- Seoul Pyeongron (서울평론; 서울評論), a weekly magazine target high-end intellectuals with in-depth discussions on hot issues. Founded on 4 November 1973, it was not a success on market, and stopped on 6 November 1975 with the final issue No. 103.
- Jugan Sports (주간스포츠; 週刊스포츠), a weekly magazine that focus on sports and leisure entertainment target young people, founded on 30 March 1975, and ended up on 29 July 1987 with the final issue No. 632.
- TV Guide (TV가이드), the country's first TV entertainment magazine, founded on 18 July 1981, it was later spun off on 30 December 1999.
- Art and Criticism (예술과 비평; 藝術과 批評), an art comment journal from 1984.
- Sports Seoul (스포츠 서울), a newspaper focus on topics of sport, it was founded on 22 June 1985 for facing the wave to the 1986 Asian Games and the 1988 Summer Olympics. Later, it was spun off on 30 December 1999.
- Queen (퀸), a female monthly magazine since 23 June 1990, it was later spun off on 30 December 1999.
- News & People (뉴스피플), a weekly news magazine founded on 5 January 1992, originally titled People (피플), renamed since issue No. 43 on 5 November.
- We, a tabloid weekend magazine target the readers have more leisure time on weekend, it covered various topics including leisure, travel, life hack, popular culture, etc. It was founded on 9 January 2004.
- Seoul in, a tabloid metropolitan section published twice a week, focused on local information in Seoul. It was founded on 1 June 2004, formerly named Seoul in Seoul (서울 in Seoul) until 15 October.
- Now News (나우뉴스), an online newspaper from 25 April 2007.
- Public IN (퍼블릭 IN), a premium magazine published weekly on Monday and target civil servants, founded on 6 February 2016, it reported on various issues including human resources, healthcare, after retirement, and financial technology, etc.
- Twig24, a culture and entertainment website.

== See also ==
- List of newspapers in South Korea
- Media in South Korea
