= Kwŏnŏp sinmun =

1912–1914 Korean-language newspaper in Russia

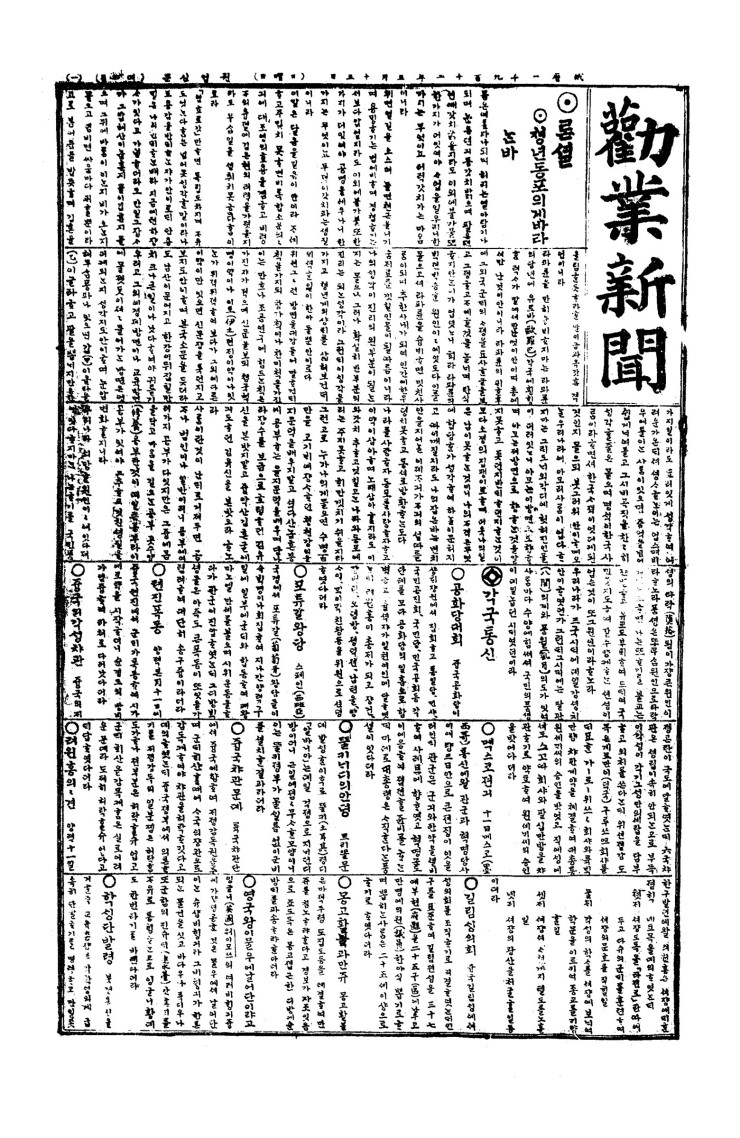
- Cover of one of its issues
- Owner(s): Kwŏnŏphoe
- Founded: May 5, 1912
- Political alignment: Korean independence movement
- Language: Korean; Russian
- Ceased publication: August 29, 1914
- City: Vladivostok
- Country: Russian Empire

Kwŏnŏp sinmun (Korean: 권업신문; Hanja: 勸業新聞; lit. Labor Development Newspaper; Russian: Квонъэб синмун; Квоноп синмун) was a weekly Korean-language newspaper published in Sinhanch'on, Vladivostok, Russian Empire from 1912 to 1914. It was written in the Korean script Hangul and was translated into Russian. It was named for and was the official publication of the Korean organization Kwŏnŏphoe.

It was one of a series of newspapers that was founded by Koreans in Vladivostok, and was preceded by the 1908 Haejo sinmun, 1908–1910 Taedong kongbo, and 1911 Taeyangbo. The newspaper's publication was ultimately ended by the outbreak of World War I.

The Independence Hall of Korea has transcriptions of some of the paper's articles online.

== Background ==
Since the late 19th century, Koreans had been settling in the Russian Far East in search of economic opportunities, and in 1910 their homeland was colonized by Japan. Vladivostok, especially the Korean enclave Sinhanch'on, became a center for the Korean independence movement and independence activists in exile. The newspaper predecessors of Kwŏnŏp sinmun (Haejo sinmun and Taedong kongbo) were staunch advocates of the movement, but were forced to close under Japanese pressure.

On July 16, 1911, Kwŏnŏphoe, a Korean organization in Vladivostok, absorbed the local Korean newspaper Taeyangbo and continued publishing it. However, the group suffered from internal political divisions early in its history, and in the midst of an internal dispute around 15,000 pieces of movable type used to publish the newspaper were stolen by the pro-Japanese Korean spy Ŏm Insŏp. This was a significant financial blow to the company, and it stopped printing. With help from the Russian government, Kwŏnŏphoe eventually settled most of its differences and unified into a coalition. The Russian government then formally recognized the group, and approved the creation of a new newspaper for it.

== History ==
Kwŏnŏphoe established Kwŏnŏp sinmun and published its first issue on May 5, 1912. It was published once per week on Sundays, and was written in pure Hangul.

Yi Chongho was its founding leader. Its first lead writer was independence activist and historian Shin Chae-ho. Its second was journalist Kim Hagu, and third Yi Sang Sul. Journalist Chang Tobin frequently contributed to the paper. Many of these people were experienced journalists who had worked in a number of other Korean newspapers in the past. One of their staff was also fluent in Russian, and he handled translation for them. The paper received support from a number of Russian people in the community. Their publisher was a Russian man named Jukov, (Note: Original Russian spelling of name is unclear; derived from Korean-language sources.) and they received support from a Russian academic of East Asian studies who had some knowledge of Korean and Chinese.

The paper was one of Kwŏnŏphoe's biggest expenses. Kwŏnŏphoe received membership fees and donations, but it was insufficient for the paper's needs. Yi Chongho ended up contributing his own funds to keep the paper going. They moved offices in December 1912. Kwŏnŏphoe, along with the paper, were forced to close upon the beginning of World War I. Japan and Russia joined the Allies, and created an agreement to crack down on Korean independence activists in Russia. The newspaper published its final issue, No. 126, on August 29, 1914. It was closed on that day under Directive No. 126 from the local government, which was adopted under Japanese pressure.

It would not be until 1917 that another newspaper would be published for Koryo-saram audience. That was the Ch'ŏnggu sinbo, which began publication after the beginning of the Russian Civil War.

== Content ==
The paper published on a variety of topics. It had editorials, reviews, local news, international news, translations and reprints of articles from other papers, and advertisements.

The paper fiercely advocated for Korean independence. Every August 29, the anniversary of Japan's annexation of Korea, it would publish a special issue in support of the independence movement. It shared pictures of An Jung-geun's assassination of former Japanese resident-general Itō Hirobumi, and advocated for the maintenance of the Korean language and culture among the diaspora. It petitioned the Russian government on a number of issues affecting the welfare and rights of Koreans, once petitioning the creation of a Korean-language library. In return, at the request of Russian government, the paper encouraged Koreans to acquire Russian citizenship and highlighted the lives of Koreans who did so.
