= Kwŏnŏphoe =

1911–1914 Korean organization in Russia

- 권업회
- Formation: June 1, 1911
- Dissolved: August 1, 1914
- Headquarters: Sinhanch'on, Vladivostok, Russian Empire

Korean name
- Hangul: 권업회; 근업회
- Hanja: 勸業會
- RR: Gwoneophoe; Geuneophoe
- MR: Kwŏnŏphoe; Kŭnŏphoe

The Kwŏnŏphoe (Note: Korean: 권업회; 근업회; Hanja: 勸業會; RR: Gwoneophoe; Geuneophoe; MR: Kwŏnŏphoe; Kŭnŏphoe; Russian: Квонъёбхве; Квонъобхве. Name sometimes translated as Work Promotion Association, Workers's Promotion Association, Korean Labor Development Society, or Association for the Encouragement of Industry.) was a Korean diaspora organization in Primorskaya Oblast, in the Russian Empire, from 1911 to 1914. It was headquartered in the Korean enclave of Sinhanch'on in Vladivostok and had branches in other Korean settlements in the Russian Far East.

The group's public-facing objectives were to promote commerce and education for the Korean community. For this, it received official recognition and funding from the local Russian government. Secretly, the group served as a hub for the Korean independence movement, and operated the militant Korean Independence Army Government: the first Korean government-in-exile during the 1910–1945 Japanese colonial period.

The group operated the newspaper Taeyangbo and its successor Kwŏnŏp sinmun. While in the midst of training an army it was building, it was forcefully closed upon the beginning of World War I. Russia and Japan both joined the Allies, and made an agreement to suppress Korean independence activists.

The group holds an important place in Korean history, and had many significant members and successor organizations. Its Korean Independence Army government was later succeeded by the National Assembly, then by the Korean Provisional Government, then by South Korea. It is also considered a landmark organization in the history of Koryo-saram: ethnic Koreans of the mainland former Soviet Union.

== Background ==
Until the mid-19th century, Korea was isolationist, and Koreans rarely left its borders. Thousands of Koreans began moving into the area that became the Russian Far East in the late 1800s, to escape a famine. Around that time, the Empire of Japan moved to consolidate its control over Korea, and eventually colonized it in 1910. Vladivostok developed a significant Korean population that congregated in the enclave Sinhanch'on, and became a center for the Korean independence movement and independence activists in exile.

== History ==
The Kwŏnŏphoe was founded on June 1, 1911, in Sinhanch'on. Its stated goals were to promote commerce and education for the Korean community. Secretly, it also served as a center of the Korean independence movement. The reason for the secrecy was because Russia had signed a number of agreements with Japan, including one in July 1910 and one on June 1, 1911, in which they would suppress and extradite Korean independence activists to the Japanese Empire. Several Korean organizations in Vladivostok, including the newspaper Taedong kongbo, were closed due to this. At the inaugural meeting, independence activists Ch'oe Chaehyŏng and Hong Beom-do served as president and vice president respectively. They had an initial membership of around 300.

In its first year, the Kwŏnŏphoe had a number of feuding implicit political factions that placed their origins in divisions in the community from years and organizations prior. Perceived factions included the North Faction (북파; 北派; Pukp'a), which was considered to be largely composed of people from Hamgyong Province. Another was the Seoul Faction (서울파; Sŏulp'a), which merged into the Korean-American (Note: Members of the Korean National Association.) Kyŏng Faction (경파; 京派) in September 1911. Another was the West Faction (서파), composed of people from Pyongan Province. These organizations were not necessarily explicitly divided by region nor ideology; while members tended to share similar opinions, they often disagreed with each other and with other groups, and there has been disagreement on which person belonged to which faction. The community disagreed on a variety of topics, for example on whether a liberated Korea should be a constitutional monarchy. The conflicts turned violent on a number of occasions. On January 23, 1910, before the establishment of the Kwŏnŏphoe, Kiho Faction (기호파) member Chŏng Sunman shot his friend and community leader Yang Sŏngch'un, possibly by accident, during an argument. Yang died three days later. After the Kwŏnŏphoe's establishment and Chŏng's release from prison, on June 21, 1911, Yang's older brother murdered Chŏng with an axe as revenge. The murders were highly controversial and inflamed factional conflicts in the community. Factions speculated and argued about the circumstances around the murders and reached differing conclusions. In another instance, a contemporary letter alleges that Yi Chongho, member of the North Faction, beat and threatened members of the West Faction to prevent them from joining the Kwŏnŏphoe. The various factions continuously made efforts to unite against their common enemy, the Empire of Japan, but negotiations were strained and took place over months.

The Kwŏnŏphoe gained the support of a local youth organization, Ch'ŏngnyŏn Kŭnŏphoe (청년근업회; 靑年勤業會), and eventually absorbed it on July 16, 1911. The Kwŏnŏphoe assumed operation and funding of the youth group's newspaper, Taeyangbo. The North and West factions competed for control over the paper. In the midst of an internal dispute, around 15,000 pieces of movable type were stolen from the paper by the pro-Japanese Korean spy Ŏm Insŏp. This effectively halted the paper's printing.

=== Official recognition and expansion ===
Beginning in late 1911, the local Vladivostok government began moving to officially recognize the Kwŏnŏphoe, and held meetings in which they mediated the group's internal disputes. Nikolay Gondatti, then governor-general of the region, was made an honorary member of the Kwŏnŏphoe. The group's management structure was reorganized, and in December, most or all the factions (Note: Historian Im Gyeong-seok (임경석) argues that the last remaining faction in Kwŏnŏphoe, the West Faction unified with the rest in April 1912. Historian Park Geol-Soon claims that the West Faction united with the others in December 1911.) were united with Russian help. On December 19, they became the first Korean organization in Vladivostok to be officially recognized by Russia. Factional influence still lingered however, and by 1913 members of the former North Faction had more influence in the group.

With support from the Russian government, they became the de facto organization for Koreans in not just Vladivostok, but the Russian Far East. They established branches in various settlements with Korean populations, including Nikolaevsk, Khabarovsk, Partizansk, and Ussuriysk. They had 10 or 13 branches by July 1914, and around 10,000 members. In 1914, it absorbed the Sinhanch'on Residents' Association (신한촌거류민회; 新韓村居留民會). The Russian government entrusted the Kwŏnŏphoe with organizing the registration of Koreans in Vladivostok as Russian citizens.

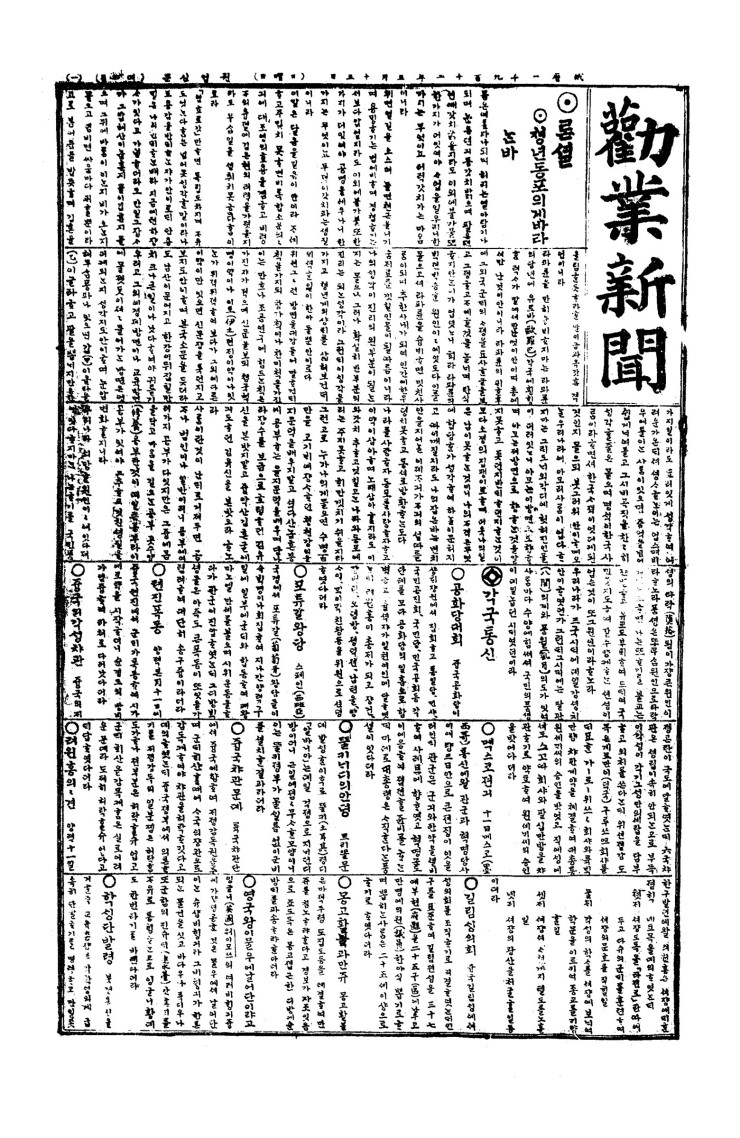
Cover of an issue of Kwŏnop sinmun

The Kwŏnŏphoe's newspaper the Kwŏnŏp sinmun was established on May 5, 1912. It was a significant source of expenses for the organization. The organization received funding through membership fees and donations, but this was insufficient; Yi Chongho donated significant personal funds to the group. The newspaper became a significant presence in the Korean diaspora, alongside the Korean-American papers Sinhan Minbo and Sinhan kukbo.

=== Secret militant activities ===
Alongside its public-facing activities, the group also secretly planned militant activities for the liberation of Korea. In June 1912, Yi Chongho, Shin Chae-ho, and Yun Hae planned an assassination attempt on Japanese Prime Minister Katsura Tarō, who had overseen Korea's annexation and was visiting Russia around this time.

In June 1913, the Kwŏnŏphoe received approval from the Vladivostok government to organize a celebration of the 50th anniversary of Koreans immigrating to Russia. The Kwŏnŏphoe was granted funds to create monuments, research histories, and translate texts into both Russian and Korean for the occasion. The Kwŏnŏphoe embezzled some of these funds to fuel its secret militant arm and Korean government-in-exile: the Korean Independence Army Government. This government coordinated activities with Korean groups across China and Russia. They established an army and militant training school in Wangqing County in Manchuria.

=== Dissolution ===
The group and its activities came to an abrupt end with the beginning of World War I in mid-1914. Russia and Japan joined the Allies, and subsequently established an agreement to crack down on Korean independence activist organizations. Russia then forcefully disbanded the Kwŏnŏphoe, some time around August 1, 1914.

== Legacy ==
The Kwŏnŏphoe's Korean Independence Army government is considered to be the first Korean government-in-exile of the colonial period. It was later succeeded by the National Assembly, then by the Korean Provisional Government, then by South Korea. It is considered to be one of the first organizations run by and for Koryo-saram: ethnic Koreans of the mainland former Soviet Union. In 2018, the Association of Koryo-saram in the Republic of Korea announced in a press release upon its establishment that it wished to carry on the legacy of the Kwŏnŏphoe. In December 2021, the South Korean Ministry of Patriots and Veterans Affairs announced that Yi Chongho, Kim Hangman, and Ch'oe Pongjun (최봉준) were selected as their independence activists of the month in recognition of their leadership roles in the Kwŏnŏphoe.

The Kwŏnŏphoe and Sinhanch'on have few physical remains or monuments in the present. In 2017, it was reported that the former location of the organization's headquarters was then a supermarket.
