= Taedong kongbo =

1908–1910 Korean-language newspaper in Russia

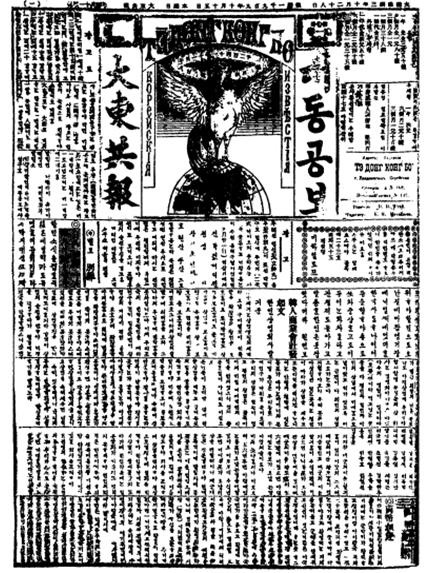
- Cover of the October 8, 1909 edition
- Founded: November 18, 1908
- Language: Korean (Hangul)
- Ceased publication: September 1, 1910
- City: Vladivostok
- Country: Russian Empire

Taedong kongbo (Korean: 대동공보; Hanja: 大東共報; RR: Daedong gongbo; Russian: Тэдонг конгбо) was a Korean-language newspaper published in Vladivostok, Russian Empire from 1908 to 1910. It briefly changed its name to Taedong sinbo (대동신보; 大東新報) before its closure. It is not to be confused with a Korean-American newspaper of a similar name (same romanized and Hangul name, but different Hanja: 大同公報). It was one of a series of Korean-language newspapers published in Vladivostok. It followed the 1908 Haejo sinmun, and was succeeded by the 1911 Taeyangbo and the 1912–1914 Kwŏnŏp sinmun.

== History ==
There was a significant population of Koreans in Vladivostok that congregated in an enclave called Kaech'ŏk-ri (개척리; 開拓里) around this time. By 1908, the Korean population was 45,900.

The newspaper was founded on November 18, 1908, soon after the closure of a previous Korean-language newspaper published in Vladivostok, Haejo sinmun. The Taedong kongbo's staff took over the equipment and used it to print their paper. It published out of addresses No. 600 and 469 on the street. The facilities are no longer extant, and are in fact in one of Vladivostok's busiest and most expensive streets. The new paper's president was Ch'a Sŏkpo (차석보; 車錫甫), editor Yu Chinyul (유진율; 兪鎭律), lead writer Yun P'ilbong (윤필봉; 尹弼鳳). Its publisher was a retired Russian general and lawyer named Mikhailov. The newspaper also employed independence activists Yi Kang and Chŏng Chaegwan, who had previously worked on the Konglip Sinbo newspaper in San Francisco. It published twice per week, every Sunday and Wednesday.

The newspaper was distributed elsewhere in Russia and internationally as well. It was shipped to the Korean diaspora in Shanghai, the United States, in Hawaii, and in Mexico. It was also shipped in secret to Korea, where its distribution was prohibited by colonial authorities. In Korea in 1909 alone, 2,235 copies of the paper in 57 shipments were confiscated. The paper was allied with the San Francisco–based Sinhan Minbo and Korea-based Taehan maeil sinbo; they shared information to each other and worked to distribute each other's issues. Some of its staff even went to go work for the Taehan, and it overall employed reporters from both America and Korea.

The newspaper and its company Taedong Kongbo Co. (대동공보사; 大東共報社) championed the Korean independence movement, and promoted militant resistance to the Japanese colonization of Korea. Korean independence activist An Jung-geun was involved in the paper, and contributed at least one article to it. In October 1909, An and the company learned that the former Japanese Resident-General of Korea, Itō Hirobumi, would visit Harbin. They developed a plot to assassinate Itō, which An executed.

The paper struggled with a lack of funding for much of its history. Ch'oe Chaehyŏng became the paper's president, and in 1910 began donating money each month to cover its expenses. The paper changed its name on August 18, 1910, to Taedong Sinbo. In July 1910, Russia and Japan signed an agreement in which Russia would regulate the behavior of its Korean residents. In August, Vladivostok issued Order No. 135, under which the newspaper closed on September 1, 1910. The Vladivostok Korean community repeatedly petitioned Vladivostok for permission to start a new newspaper. One request finally succeeded, and on June 5, 1911, a successor paper was founded by the youth group Ch'ŏngnyŏn Kŭnŏphoe (청년근업회; 靑年勤業會) entitled Taeyangbo.

== See also ==
- List of newspapers in Korea
- History of newspapers in Korea
- Sinhanch'on
