= Ch'ŏnggu sinbo =

1917–1919 Korean newspaper in Russia

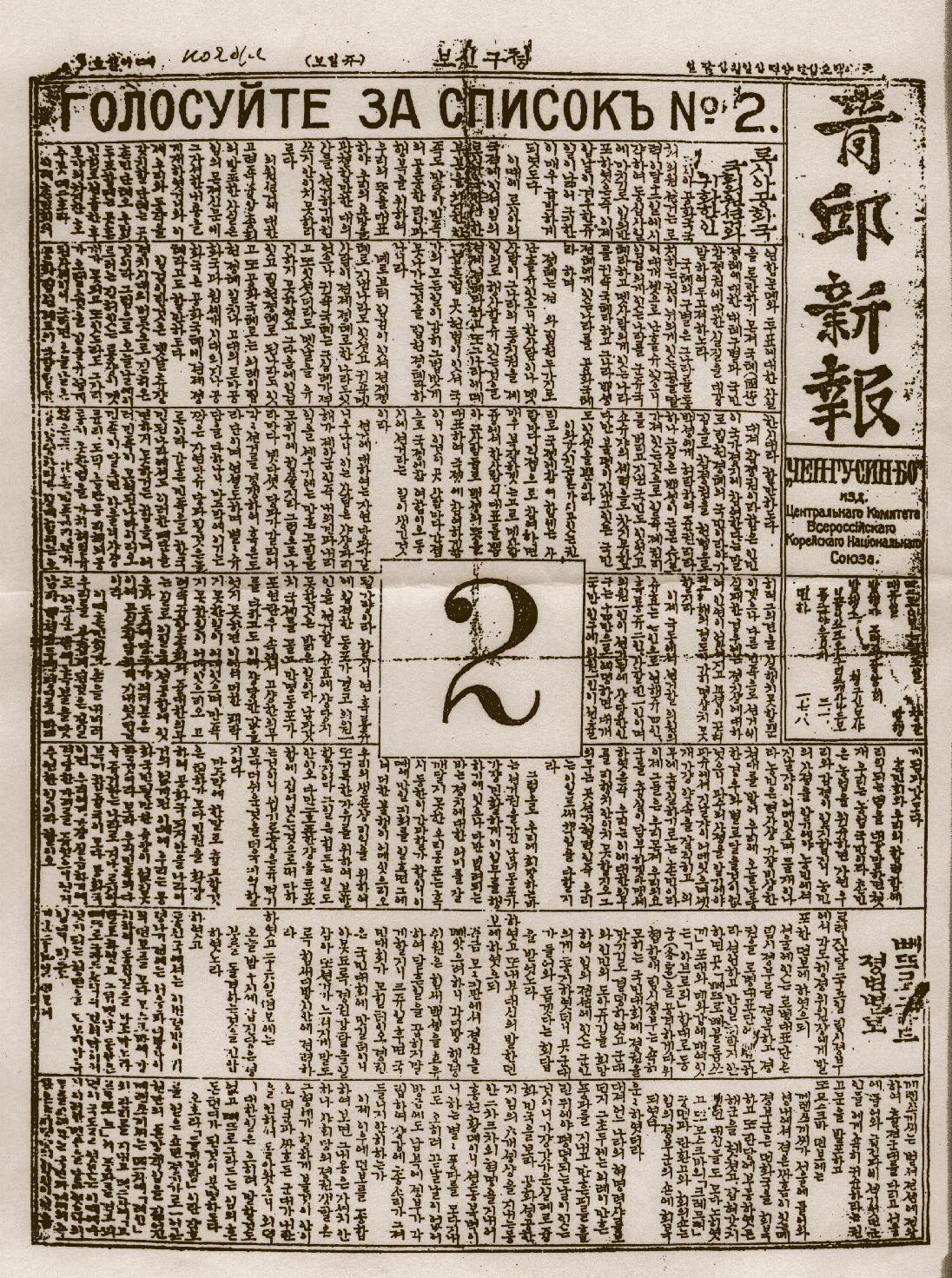
- Founded: March 31, 1917
- Language: Korean (Hangul)
- Ceased publication: Late 1919
- City: Nikolsk-Ussuriysky
- Country: Russian Empire

Ch'ŏnggu sinbo (Note: Korean: 청구신보; Hanja: 靑丘新報; Russian: Ченгу Синбо; Ченгу Шимбо; Чонгу синбо) was a weekly Korean-language newspaper published in Nikolsk-Ussuriysky, Russian Empire from 1917 to 1919. It was renamed to Hanjok Kongbo (한족공보; 韓族公報) shortly before its closure.

== Background ==
A previous newspaper for Koreans in Vladivostok, Kwŏnŏp sinmun, had been published from 1912 to 1914, but was discontinued due to political pressure from the Empire of Japan and the Russian Empire. Furthermore, the Korean organization that published the newspaper, Gwoneophoe, was also disbanded. However, with the rise of the 1917–1923 Russian Civil War, Koreans found themselves with more political freedom. In April 1917, a convention was called to create a new organization for Koreans in Russia (tentatively called 노령한인협회발기회). But negotiations for the creation of the new organization were strained due to a number of divisions in the Korean community, such as whether or not the Koreans wanted to obtain Russian citizenship or whether they supported the Bolsheviks in the civil war. The pro-Bolshevik faction left the conference, and the remaining majority anti-Bolshevik faction that supported obtaining citizenship formed an organization based in Nikolsk-Ussuriysky: the Korean General Assembly (고려족중앙총회). The pro-Bolshevik faction established a separate organization, the Aryŏng Korean Association (아령한인회; 俄領韓人會), and began publishing their own newspaper, the Hanin sinbo (한인신보; 韓人新報).

== History ==
The Korean General Assembly began publishing the Ch'ŏnggu sinbo (청구신보; 靑邱新報) on March 31, 1917. It was intended to be a weekly newspaper, but this effort was frustrated due to financial constraints.

In January 1918, the two organizations merged into a new organization (전로한족회중앙총회). Around this time, they renamed the paper to Hanjok kongbo.

The newspaper closed around the end of 1919.
