= Keijō nippō =

1906–1945 Japanese newspaper in Korea

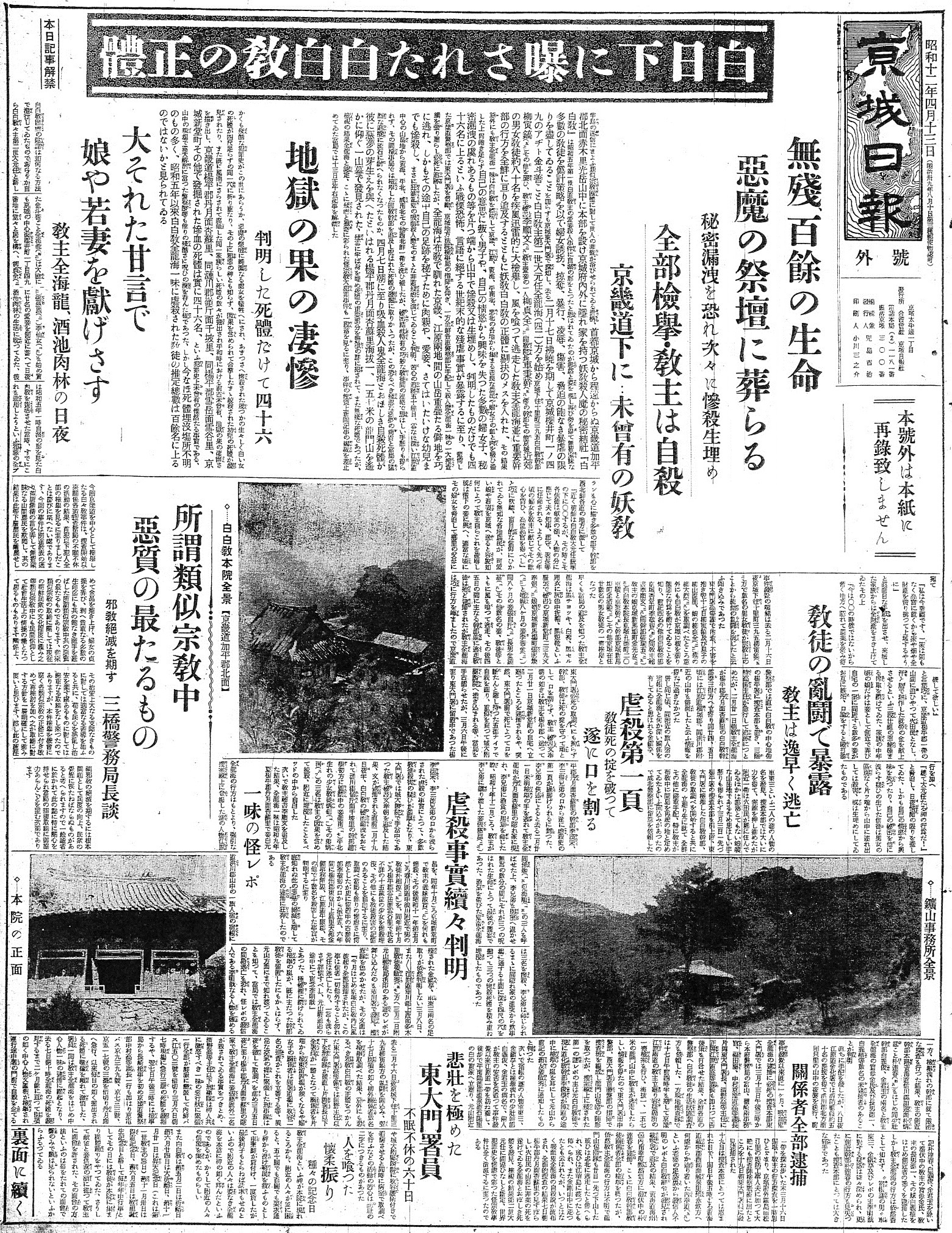
- The April 13, 1937 issue
- Type: Daily newspaper
- Format: Broadsheet
- Founded: September 1, 1906
- Ceased publication: December 11, 1945
- Political alignment: Pro-Empire of Japan
- Language: Japanese
- Headquarters: Keijō, Korea, Empire of Japan
- OCLC number: 56916882

Keijō nippō (京城日報; Korean: 경성일보; RR: Gyeongseong ilbo; MR: Kyŏngsŏng ilbo) was a Japanese-language newspaper published in Korea from 1906 to 1945. It is primarily associated with the Japanese colonial period in Korea, and is considered to have functionally been an official newspaper of the Japanese Government-General of Chōsen.

During its peak around World War II, it had the highest circulation of any newspaper published in Korea, followed by the Fuzan nippō and Chōsen shinbun. Due to press centralization policies, from around 1942 to 1945 it was the only newspaper in Seoul with significant printing equipment.

After the August 15, 1945 announcement of the surrender of Japan, it became greatly destabilized. On October 31, 1945, it was ordered to cede its operations to Korean people. It continued being published until December 11, 1945, in order to keep the remaining Japanese people in Korea informed of political developments. The paper then dissolved; its equipment, staff, and facilities became part of various Korean newspapers.

Many of its early issues are now considered lost after they were destroyed by fire. The Korean Newspaper Archive has many issues from 1915 to 1945 available.

== Background ==
Japan began moving to incorporate Korea as its protectorate in the 1900s, and began publishing newspapers that promoted these themes and advocated for further Japanese control. Japan's agenda was soon confronted by the English- and Korean-language newspaper The Korea Daily News, run by British journalist in Korea Ernest Bethell, which dodged Japanese censorship and criticized Japan's treatment of Korea sharply. In response, Japanese Resident-General of Korea Itō Hirobumi began issuing an English-language newspaper to counter Bethell's, entitled The Seoul Press. Japan also applied pressure on both Bethell and the British government to stop the newspaper's publication. Bethell died in 1909 after a years-long legal battle, and his newspaper was sold and converted into the Maeil sinbo, which promoted Japanese government lines.

== History ==
=== Early history ===
The Keijō nippō was formed via a merger between around seven pro-Japanese newspapers in Korea, namely the Kanjō shinpō and Daitō shinpō. These two papers were acquired by the Japanese Resident-General of Korea in July and early August 1906. Resident-General Itō played a significant role in the Keijō nippō's creation, and even reportedly proposed the name of the paper. The name means "Daily Keijō". It is believed the paper was founded specifically to counter Bethell's papers.

The paper was approved for creation on August 10, 1906, and published its first issue on September 1 of that year. The original headquarters was located in what is now Pil-dong, on the north side of the mountain Namsan. Its first president was a former editor-in-chief of The Asahi Shimbun, Itō Yūkan (伊東祐侃). It was initially published with both Japanese and Korean editions, but it stopped publishing Korean editions on either April 21 or September 21, 1907 possibly due to a lack of public interest in the publication. The newspaper's publication was temporarily restricted a number of times in 1908 because it published critically about Itō's handling of instability in the peninsula. The paper advocated for harsher crackdowns on militant unrest.

=== Early colonial period ===
On August 30, 1910, the Maeil sinbo and Keijō nippō were consolidated under a company Keijō Nippōsha (京城日報社), with the former's offices located inside the latter's headquarters. In 1910, the Keijō nippō was put under the management of Tokutomi Sohō. Tokutomi was president of the major Tokyo-based newspaper Kokumin shimbun. He brought many of his trusted journalist friends to Seoul to work on the paper. The papers became so tied together, that journalists of Keijō nippō reportedly jokingly called their office the "branch office" and the Kokumin office "headquarters". The paper published along Japanese government lines, promoting the annexation and discouraging independence sentiment.

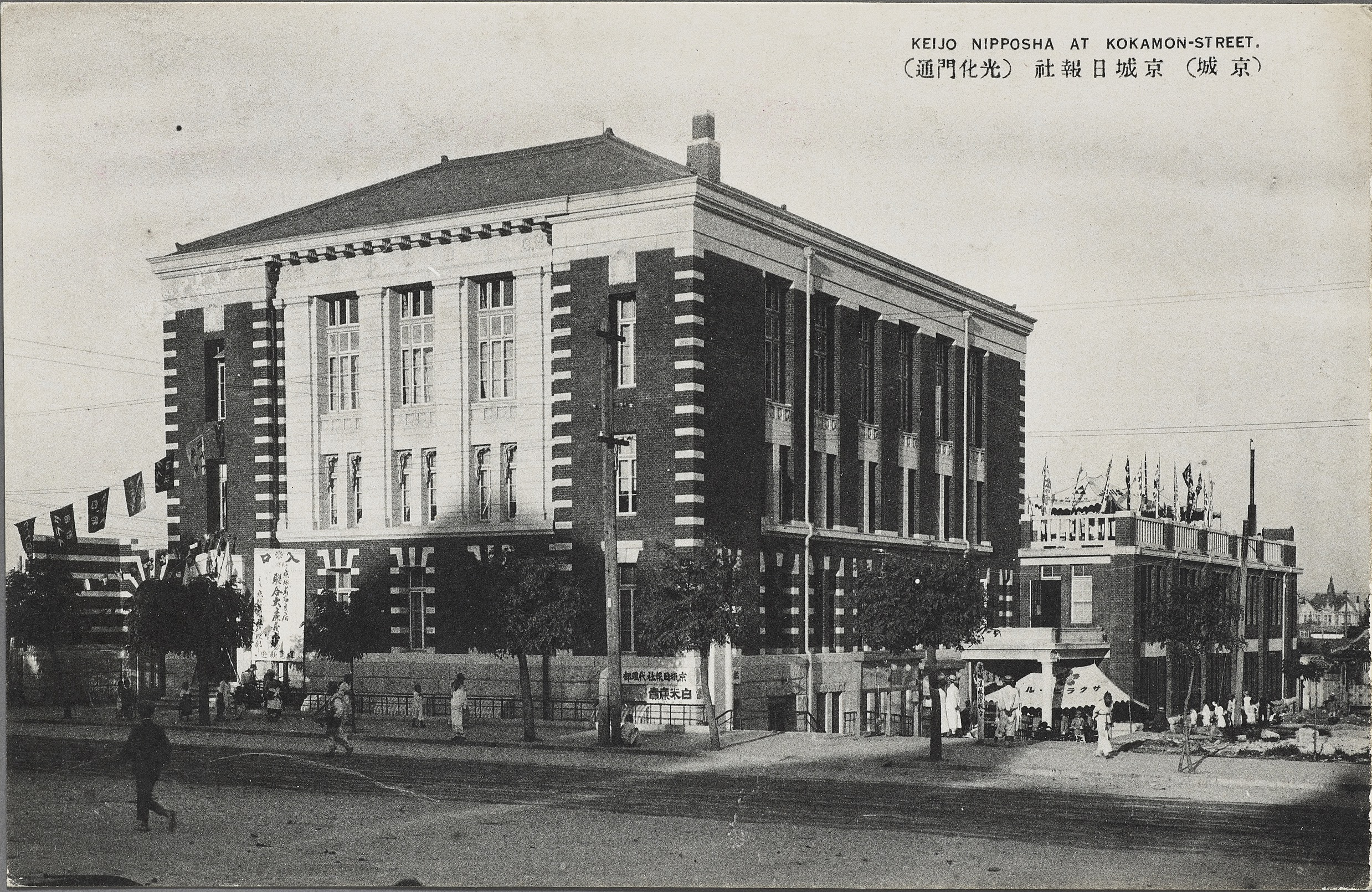
The newspaper's headquarters beginning in 1924. Located along Jongno.

In November 1914, it moved headquarters to the current location of the Seoul City Hall. Its headquarters was destroyed in a fire in 1923. The former location became the city hall, and the new headquarters finished construction on June 15, 1924 nearby, at what is today the location of the headquarters of the Korea Press Foundation. The Seoul Press was integrated into the Keijō nippō in 1930.

=== World War II ===
World War II was a time of significant change for the media landscape in Korea. During this period, the Keijō nippō consolidated its position of prominence.

On April 29, 1938, Maeil sinbo became independent from Keijō nippō. The two papers had long resented each other; staff of the more stable and profitable Keijō nippō reportedly felt that they were keeping Maeil sinbo financially afloat, and dubbed the Korean paper "The Cancer of the Keijō nippō ". On that same day, the Keijō Nippōsha began publishing a Japanese-language daily newspaper for children called Keinichi shōgakkōsei shinbun (京日少學生新聞), which was renamed Keinichi shōkokumin shinbun (京日少國民新聞) from April 1942.

A number of Japanese policies during this period made market conditions more favorable to the Keijō nippō. Education in the Korean language was banned, and the use of the Japanese language became required in a number of settings. In 1940, the Japanese government began a policy that has been dubbed "One Province, One Company" (1道1社), under which Japanese- and Korean-language newspapers were made to consolidate or close. The Chōsen shinbun was merged into the Keijō nippō. Furthermore, the Korean newspapers The Chosun Ilbo and The Dong-A Ilbo were forced to close, and their printing equipment was transferred to the ownership of the Keijō nippō. By the time of Korea's 1945 liberation, the Keijō nippō was the only facility with significant printing equipment in Seoul. From 1942 to 1943, the newspaper's circulation increased by 200,000, and Koreans came to form 60% of the paper's customer base.

=== Liberation of Korea and closure ===
On August 15, 1945, Japan's loss in World War II was announced, which signaled the liberation of Korea. The Keijō nippō was informed of the announcement the evening prior, and had already prepared an article for the announcement. Shortly after the announcement, it published its article. Around this time, the newspaper company had around 2,000 employees, of which 100 were Korean. Its circulation was around 410,000 copies, and its Shōkokumin Shinbun had around 390,000 copies. Its final president was Yokomizo Mitsuteru.

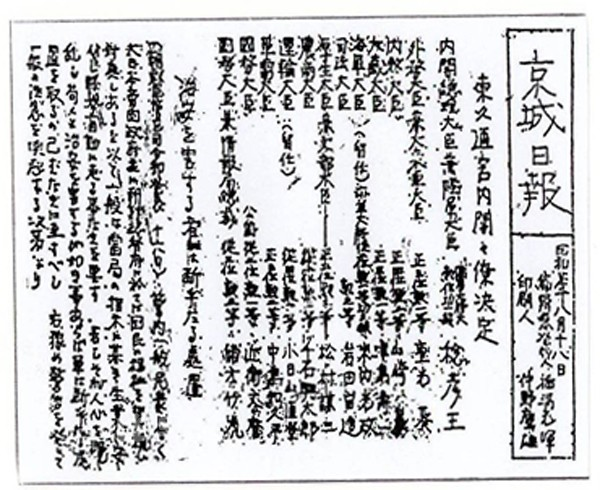
The mimeograph edition of the Keijō nippō that was posted around Seoul (August 18, 1945)

The Japanese colonial bureau of information instructed Yokomizo to continue publishing, in order to support the Japanese settlers still remaining in Korea. Korean employees of the paper requested that the paper be handed over to them on the 16th, and the Keijō nippō leadership refused. Korean workers went on strike; sand was thrown into the rotary press, which stopped the publication of the August 17 and 18 issues. On August 18, Yokomizo created a handmade mimeograph edition of the paper, in which he relayed orders from the colonial government to maintain public order. The newspaper's employees were paid a three-month salary in advance, in anticipation of further instability.

For months afterwards, the newspaper's monopoly over printing equipment became a topic of contention for Koreans. Korean employees and various left- and right-leaning Korean groups began advocating for seizing the newspaper's facilities. For example, the left-leaning Committee for the Preparation of Korean Independence made an attempt to seize the equipment. However, around 100 Japanese troops were stationed at the offices, which prevented any Korean seizures. A faction of left-leaning Korean employees split off and founded their own newspaper, Korean People's News on September 8.

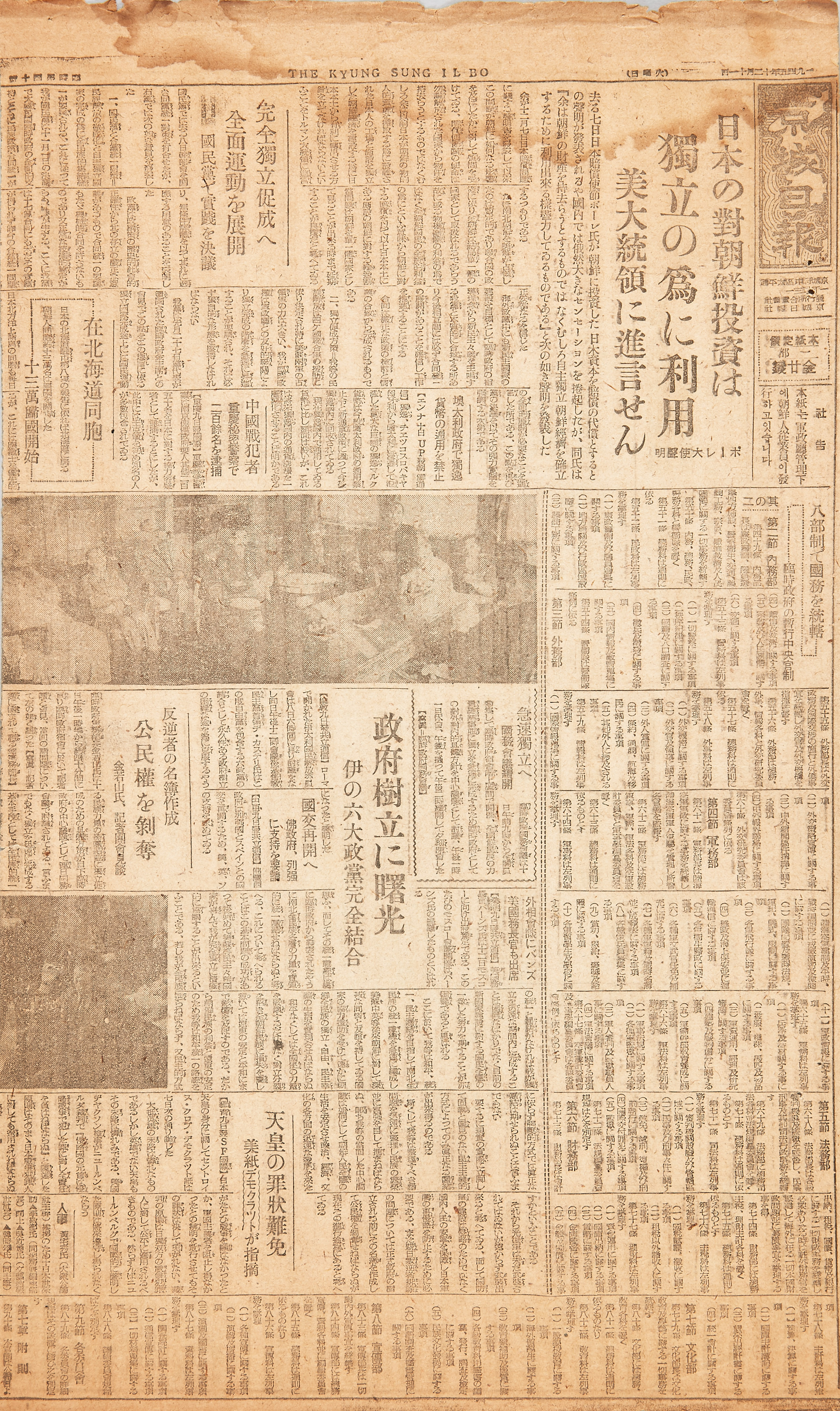
The final edition of the paper (December 11, 1945)

The United States Army Military Government in Korea placed Seoul and Korea below the 38th parallel into an occupation zone in early September. They placed the Keijō nippō under their control on September 25. The paper continued publishing for its Japanese audience until November 1, until they were ordered (Order no. 13,746) to hand over the operation to the Koreans. Still, the Koreans continued sharing information for Japanese people, in coordination with the Assistance Association for Japanese Residents in Seoul. The newspaper ceased publication on December 11, 1945.

The Chosun Ilbo and The Dong-A Ilbo resumed publication and used the printing equipment. Its equipment was also used by the 1945–1950 newspaper Hanseong Ilbo (한성일보; 漢城日報).

== Content ==
How Koreans are described in the newspaper has often been described by modern scholars as condescending and discriminatory. Koreans who opposed Japanese policies were often described in the paper as backward "barbarians". They were frequently contrasted with the "civilized" Japanese settlers. After the nationwide pro-independence March First Movement protests in Korea, the paper mocked the activists. It wrote in its March 7, 1919 edition that Koreans lacked an understanding of all the Japan had done for them, and that they were incapable of self-governance. An article read: "Koreans believe that after the President of the United States [Woodrow Wilson] established the League of Nations, even small and weak countries would avoid the domination of Great Powers, and be able to maintain their national independence. How foolish they are!" The writer concluded with "Ah, [you] pitiful Koreans! You are governed by evil thoughts... Awake! Awake! ...If you do not have an understanding of the situation of the world, you will be doomed to perish."

The newspaper published literature in its pages. According to the Korean Newspaper Archive, rather than simply print stories about people in Japan, it often printed stories about people in colonial Korea. The Keijō Nippōsha sponsored a number of cultural events, including concerts, film screenings, and lectures.

== Circulation and competition ==
Circulation by year
Year	Circulation	Ref
1929	26,352	
1933	35,592	
1935	34,294	
1939	61,976	
1945	410,000	

Of newspapers published in Korea, Keijō nippō had one of the largest circulations, even rivaling that of the native Korean newspaper The Dong-a Ilbo. However, it did not sell more than Japanese newspapers imported from Japan to Korea; for example, in 1929, the Osaka Mainichi Shimbun and Osaka Asahi Shimbun sold 48,853 copies and 41,572 copies in Korea respectively, compared to the 26,352 of the Keijō nippō. The Keijō nippō worked to compete with the Japanese imports, but it struggled to do so; the paper was once criticized in a colonial government document as having lower quality journalism and being slower to print some stories than newspapers imported from Japan.

== List of presidents ==
- 1906–1908 – Itō Yūkan (伊東祐侃)
- 1908–1910 – Ōoka Tsutomu (大岡力)
- 1910 – Tokutomi Sohō
- 1910–1914 – Yoshino Tazaemon (吉野太左衛門)
- 1915–1918 – Abe Mitsuie (阿部充家)
- 1918–1921 – Katō Fusazō (加藤房藏)
- 1921–1924 – Akizuki Satsuo
- 1924–1927 – Soejima Michimasa
- 1927–1931 – Matsuoka Masao (松岡正男)
- 1931–1932 – Ikeda Hideo
- 1932–1936 – Tokizane Akiho (時實秋穗)
- 1936–1938 – Takada Tomoichirō (高田知一郞)
- 1938–1939 – Taguchi Sukeichi
- 1939–1942 – Midarai Tatsuo (御手洗辰雄)
- 1942–1944 – Takamiya Taihei
- 1944–1945 – Yokomizo Mitsuteru

== See also ==
- List of newspapers in Korea
- History of newspapers in Korea
- Korea under Japanese rule
