= Ernest Bethell =

British journalist in Korea (1872–1909)

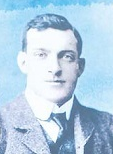
- Born: 3 November 1872; Bristol, United Kingdom
- Died: 1 May 1909 (aged 36); Seoul, Korean Empire (now in South Korea)
- Occupation: Journalist

Korean name
- Hangul: 배설
- Hanja: 裵說
- RR: Bae Seol
- MR: Pae Sŏl

Ernest Thomas Bethell (3 November 1872 – 1 May 1909) was a British journalist. He founded a newspaper that advocated Korean independence from Japan, The Korea Daily News. He is also known by his Korean name Pae Sŏl (Korean: 배설; Hanja: 裵說).

== Arrival in Korea ==
In 1904, Ernest Bethell travelled from Kobe, Japan, where he had been in the export business, to Korea as a correspondent for the Daily Chronicle, with the purpose of reporting on the Russo-Japanese War. He then continued to stay in Korea and reported on Japanese imperialism in Korea. Bethell soon noted the abuses by Japanese soldiers towards Koreans, and how Koreans were treated unfairly and as inferior to the Japanese.

== The Korea Daily News ==
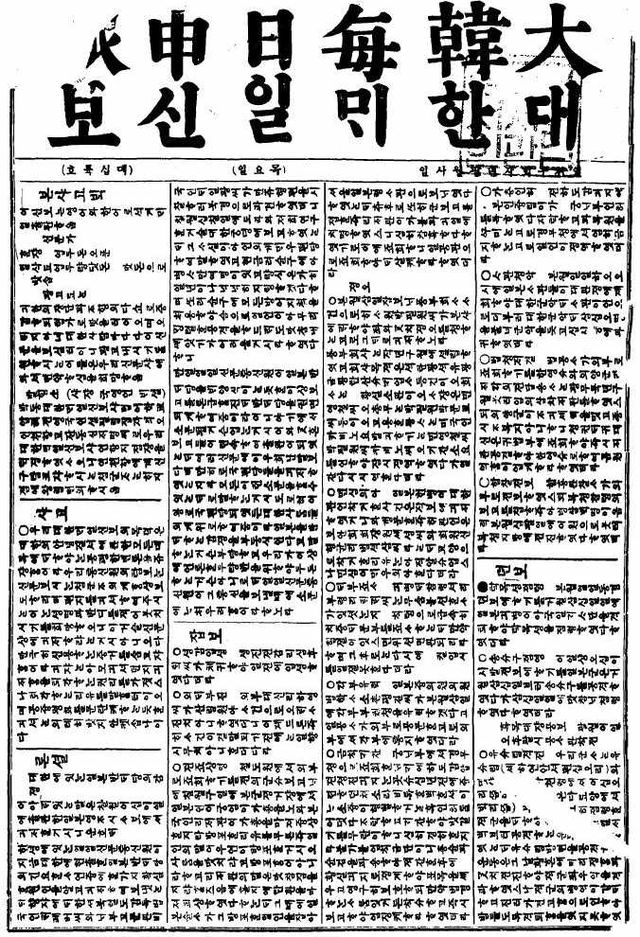
Korea Daily News, front page

He founded an early newspaper in Korea with Yang Gi-tak, a Korean independence activist, in 1904 called The Korea Daily News, which was published concurrently in Korean as Daehan Maeil Sinbo (대한매일신보; 大韓每日申報). The publication was strongly antagonistic to Japanese rule in Korea. The paper was available in three versions – English, Korean, and Korean mixed script. Many people who opposed the Japanese rule, such as Park Eun-sik and Sin Chae-ho, wrote articles and columns in the paper.

== Prosecution for sedition ==
At the time, British subjects enjoyed extraterritorial rights in Korea. Because the paper was published by a British subject, it was not subject to local law. However, in 1907, Bethell was prosecuted in the British Consular Court in Seoul for breach of the peace and given a good behaviour bond of six months.

The next year, at the request of the Japanese Residency-General, Bethell was prosecuted in the British Supreme Court for China and Corea (sic), sitting in Seoul, for sedition against the Japanese government of Korea. He was convicted of sedition and was sentenced by judge F.S.A. Bourne to three weeks of imprisonment and a six-month good behaviour bond. As there was no suitable jail in Korea, he was taken to Shanghai aboard HMS Clio and detained at the British Consular Gaol in Shanghai.

== Death ==
After being released, he returned to Seoul to continue his business. He died of cardiomegaly on 1 May 1909.

== Legacy ==
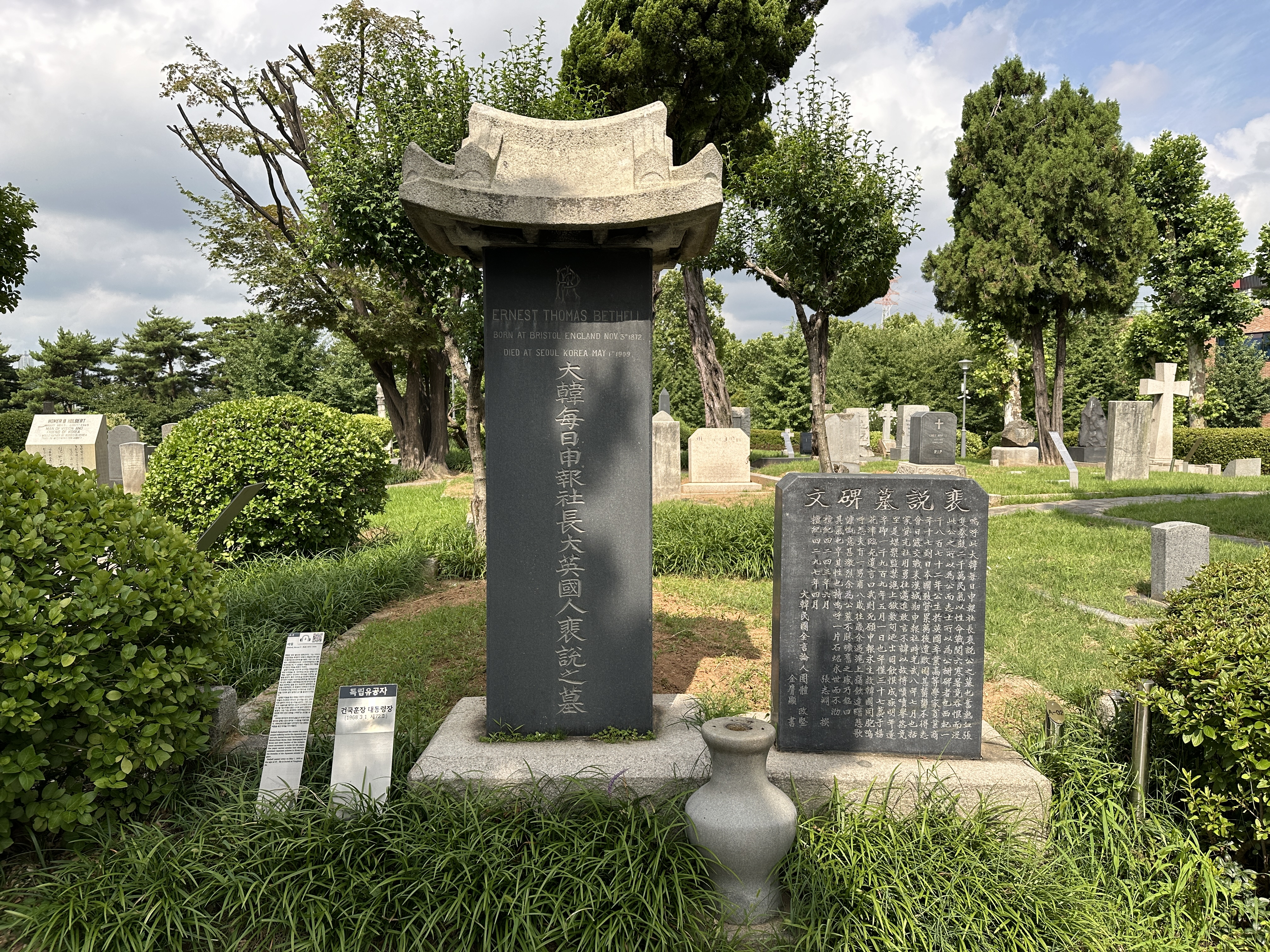
Bethell's grave in Yanghwajin Foreign Missionary Cemetery (2024)

The Korean people erected a monument in his honour, though it was defaced by the Japanese. Another monument was erected near the original one in 1964 by journalists living in South Korea. Both can be now seen at his grave at Yanghwajin Foreigners' Cemetery.

In 1968, he was awarded the Order of Merit for National Foundation from the South Korean government.

=== 2012 memorial service ===
On 8 May 2012, a special memorial service organised by the Bethell Commemoration Committee was held for Bethell at the Yanghwajin Foreigners' Cemetery. Former South Korean Prime Minister Lee Soo-sung chaired the ceremony and President Lee Myung-bak sent flowers to mark the event. About 250 people participated in the ceremony, also including Park Yoo-chul, chairman of the Korea Liberation Association. British Ambassador Scott Wrightman spoke at the ceremony, saying:

“This ceremony celebrates Ernest Bethell’s contribution to the history of modern Korea and his particular role in strengthening the bonds which bind our two countries ... Recent events in other parts of the world remind us that freedom of expression is not universal. It’s fitting therefore that we celebrate the role of people such as Ernest Bethell who highlighted the cruelty of imperialism, defended the rights of the marginalized and reaffirmed the basic rights of all to live in a free and just society.”
