= Sin Ch'aeho =

Korean historian (1880–1936)

- 신채호
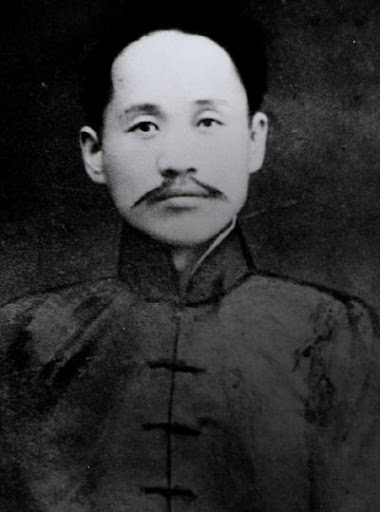
- Born: December 8, 1880; Chungcheong, Sannaeri, Joseon
- Died: February 21, 1936 (aged 55); Port Arthur, Empire of Japan
- Awards: Presidential Order of Merit for National Foundation (1962) (PH)

Education
- Education: National Confucian Academy (Seonggyungwan)

Philosophical work
- Era: 19th- / 20th-century philosophy
- Region: Eastern philosophy
- School: Korean Confucianism; Korean nationalism; Left-wing nationalism; Anarchism
- Main interests: Nationalist Historiography; Korean mythology; Revolutionary Theory
- Notable ideas: Juche; Ethnic nationalism; Anarchist nationalism

Korean name
- Hangul: 신채호
- Hanja: 申采浩
- RR: Sin Chaeho
- MR: Sin Ch'aeho

Art name
- Hangul: 단재
- Hanja: 丹齋
- RR: Danjae
- MR: Tanjae

Sin Ch'aeho, or Shin Chae-ho or Sin Chaeho (Korean: 신채호; December 8, 1880 – February 21, 1936), was a Korean independence activist, historian, anarchist, nationalist, and a founder of Korean nationalist historiography (민족 사학, minjok sahak; sometimes shortened to minjok). He is held in high esteem in both North and South Korea.

Two of his works, A New Reading of History (Doksa Sillon), written in 1908, and The Early History of Joseon (Joseon Sanggosa), published in 1931, are considered key works of nationalist historiography in modern Korea. He argued that modern Koreans and the people of Manchuria were of a single minjok which has an ancestral claim to both Korea and Manchuria, Shin also studied Korean mythology. During his exile in China, Shin joined the Eastern Anarchist Association and wrote anti-imperialist and pro-independence articles in various outlets; his anarchist activities lead to his arrest and subsequent death in prison, February 21, 1936.

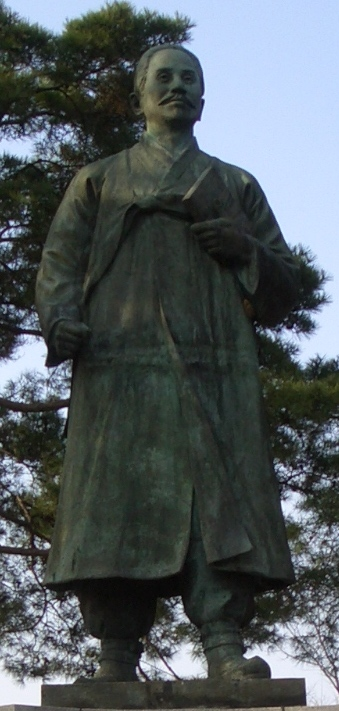
Statue of Sin Ch'aeho in Seoul's Grand Park.

== Biography ==
=== Early years ===
Sin was born on December 8, 1880. His grandfather was an official in the royal advisory department. His pen name was "Dansaeng", which he later changed to "Danjae". Sin was taught various Neo-Confucian books and concepts by his grandfather, and later enrolled in the Confucian academy Sungkyunkwan, receiving a doctoral degree in 1905. Sin, to a limited capacity, read Italian literature and history and published some Italian-related works; There is some speculation that Dante might be an influence on Sin Ch'aeho's work, in particular Dream Sky (1916).

Sin went on to work for the editorial boards for two newspapers, the Hwangsŏng Sinmun and the Taehan Maeil Sinbo, and became the leader of the underground "patriotic enlightenment" group, the Sinminhoe. His group would later migrate to Manchuria in 1910 and attract such radicals as Yi Tong-hwi, a Korean Bolshevik who participated in "The Conspiracy case of 1911," which was an effort to assassinate Japanese Governor-General Terauchi, leading to the arrests of several Sinminhoe members and eventually the dissolution of the Sinminhoe.

=== Abroad ===
Sin went into voluntary exile in August 1910 when Japan declared its annexation of Korea. He traveled to the Shinhanchon Korean enclave in Vladivostok, where he became the head writer for the newspapers Haejo Sinmun and Taeyangbo. He moved to China in 1913, and traveled the country. Sin never returned to Korea, and since he refused to file for citizenship with the Empire of Japan he became stateless. The March First Independence Movement, in 1919 spurred him to join the Korean Provisional Government in Shanghai. Sin quickly became frustrated with the Provisional Government, culminating in a clash with interim leader Syngman Rhee (I Seung-man) and Sin leaving to embrace anarchism and draft the "Declaration of Korean Revolution" for the Righteous Brotherhood (Uiyeoldan) in 1923. Sin went on to join the Eastern Anarchist Association (동방 무정부주의 연맹; 東方無政府主義聯盟) in 1926.

=== Arrest and death ===
Sin was arrested by the Japanese Military Police in Taiwan in May 1928 for the attempted smuggling of 12,000 yuan in forged banknotes out of Taiwan under the pseudonym "Yu Byeong-taek" (유병택; 柳烟澤) in an effort to help fund the Eastern Anarchist Association's general activities and bomb factory. He was sentenced to a 10-year prison term by the Dalian District Court to be served in Lüshun Prison. Sin died while in solitary confinement at Lüshun Prison of a brain hemorrhage on 21 February 1936. The Republic of Korea posthumously awarded Sin with the Presidential Medal of the Order of Merit for National Foundation in 1962 and citizenship on April 13, 2013.

== Thought ==
=== The Minjok and Korean ethnic nationalism ===
Sin Ch'aeho wrote extensively on a theory of ethnic history which sought to challenge traditional border concepts in Korea and encourage Korean nationalism. This theory is broadly referred to as the Korean minjok (민족; 民族); An early form of the minjok is found in his article "New History Reader." Sin's minjok works contested the traditional conception of Korea as a geographically defined "peninsular nation" (반도 국; pandoguk), which was born out of politics associated with the Mandate of Heaven in classical Chinese political philosophy. This Chinese hegemony was interpreted as Sinocentric by Sin, and others, as it placed border control in the hands of the Chinese Court.

Sin's minjok historiographical work traced a nation's history by its ethnic genealogy and lineage, relying on heritable traits and culture. The minjok was defined by the terms of its history, and history was shaped by the minjok, hence these two concepts were reciprocal and inseparable. For Sin, "if one dismisses the minjok, there is no history"; to ignore or to down-play the minjok was to devitalize history itself.

Within the greater minjok history of a nation there was a host ethnic group, the chujok (주족); the identification of the chujok was necessary for tracing the authentic history of a nation, and solidified an ethnocentric national history. For Korea, the chujok was the ancient Korean-Manchurian Kingdom of the Buyeo (부여; 夫餘), which, by Sin's estimate, began 5,000 years ago with the birth of Dangun, the legendary son of a bear who was transformed into a human by the god Whanin. By combining mythology and genealogy, a common ancestry of Koreans and Manchurians was traced, effectively making them family. Sin thereby attempted to erase the geographical border between Korea and Manchuria in favour of ethnic re-unification.

Distinct from the minjok was the state or country, the gukga (국가; 國家; or kukka). The minjok as a more basal concept than the gukga and did not substantially change between generations, whereas the gukga could change between kingdoms, government, and rules.

By defining the minjok as a rich and powerful ethnic history, Sin constructed an anti-imperialism and anti-colonialism social defence. Largely, the goal was rejection of both Chinese and Japanese governmental oversight and influence. Contemporaneous Japanese historians also argued that Koreans and Manchurians were the same group, but their efforts were to prove Korea was historically indistinct from other nations and thus mitigate Korea's importance.

==== Social Darwinism ====
Sin is sometimes called a social Darwinist, a popular concept in the early 20th century. Within Sin's work, the Manchurian-Korean Buyeo minjok is interpreted as the standard of measure for historical progress in Korea. Sin described a minjok history of conflict between the various ethnic groups of East Asia, as well as a political history. Towards this progress, Sin's minjok project was laid out in terms of national victories: specifically for the Buyeo, victory would be complete reunification of the Korean ethnicity and then-on defending against cultural assimilation and imperialism.

This "Darwinian-Spencerian" framework, which prized ethnic nationalism and purity, allowed Sin to write a minjok-centred history of Korea that attempted to shut down the Japanese colonial justifications by conjoining ethnic history and progress, necessarily making harmful the adulteration of Korean society with Japanese culture, not a progressive one.

Sin did not describe Korea as the "victor" of these ethnic battles. Sin described a slow fall of the minjok, primarily attributing a high point to King Muyeol of Silla, and then descent through the fall of Balhae and slow fracturing of Korean social unity through politics and war. Sin praised the Koryeo and Choseon dynasties, but insisted that the successes that they brought were only partial, lamenting that if scholars "are searching for a full unification, it cannot be found after Tangun."

==== Juche ====
Sin Ch'aeho is often credited as the primary source in the Juche (주체; 主體; meaning Self-reliance or Autonomy; sometimes spelt Chuch'e) political ideology. Juche aspires towards a country's complete autonomy, both in a national sense and in an historical sense. However, it is not clear whether the North Korean Juche is modelled upon or is merely similar to Sin's Juche. Scholars such as Sheila Miyoshi Jager have written that strong references about the history of North Korean ideology are uncommon, but similarities in language, symbolism, and the concepts make Sin a good candidate as an influence on Kim Il Sung and his own Juche state ideology. Sin's Juche concept is also specifically Korean; however it bears a likeness to Japanese Kokutai (국체; Kukche).

=== Anarchism ===
Sin Ch'aeho's anarchist philosophy is largely ignored by contemporary Korean scholars. One of his later works, The Dream Sky, is considered one of these anarchist-themed works, and explores themes of "clear understanding," an individual's "own way", and praises "human struggle" as a righteous path. The book also challenged literary standards by ending on an ellipsis and breaking historical continuity by borrowing characters from Korean history.

=== Legacy ===
In South Korea, after the emancipation from Japan, Sin was not considered an important author. The term minjok was decried as politically unacceptable by Sin's old acquaintance from the Provisional Government, and now the first president of South Korea, Syngman Rhee. The new South Korean government favoured the term kukka (국가), which implied loyalty to the Republic of Korea, over Sin's minjok (민족). In the 1960s, Rhee's political regime ended and anti-imperialism sentiments redoubled, followed by scholars pursuing a new autonomous history of Korea, and revived the term minjok. By 1980, Sin Ch'aeho had become a powerful figure in Korean historiography, but concepts like minjok, among others, are interpreted in ways that favour the South Korean Government over the North's.

The Park military regime in South Korea pushed for capitalist economic development, noting that dismantling the North Korean communist state would do the minjok saengjon good. Following nationalist trends, some South Korean Minjung movements made appeals to national self-reliance (minjok juchesung).

North Korea also sponsored re-reading Sin, among other Korean authors. In the Democratic People's Republic of Korea, Kim Il Sung is said to be the leader of the minjok, and follows similar genealogical tracings of Koreans into ancient Korean-Manchuria.

Sin Ch'aeho is held in high esteem by North Korea and made a lasting impact on the Korean perception of Japan and imperialism generally. Two of his works, Doksa Sillon ("A New Reading of History"), written in 1908, and Joseon Sanggosa ("The Early History of Joseon"), published in 1931, are particularly important in the nationalist historiography of modern Korea.

A consequence of Sin's nationalistic thought might be the discouragement of the Korean diaspora—the closer a Korean was to Korean soil the closer they were to their cultural "space." For Sin, space, culture, and patriotism became inseparable. A worry of some Koreans is their ethno-cultural continuation, and the loss of "Korean-ness" as Koreans either travel abroad or adopt foreign customs.

== Criticism ==
=== Standards of education ===
Sin Ch'aeho's high standards of education and early enrollment of children in school (at age 4) were criticized as excessive. He responded that some four-year-olds already knew the Thousand Character Classic and that some had already begun the Children's First Learning Programme (Tongmong sŏnsŭp). He also argued that historical standards of education were steeper than the contemporary standards. All the while, Sin believed all Korean citizens should learn both Hangul and Hanja to aid in preserving Korean identity, rather than subject themselves to the Chinese language system, and to study Korean patriotic literature.

=== Concerns with Minjok thought ===
As part of the minjok historiography, Sin rebuked some scholars for focusing too much on geography and borders rather than minjok ethnic boundaries; he called these scholars "territorial historians". However, his own works consistently employed territorial terms, boundaries, borders that only differ by how Sin justified them by a very ancient Korea, while the "territorial historians'" terms are usually traced to younger Chinese courts. This is aggravated by the fact that Sin had few, if any, compelling references for his historical claims, making his boundaries largely arbitrary or folk-history based.

=== Dream Sky borrowed from Dante's Divine Comedy ===
Sin Ch'aeho's Dream Sky at times resembles Dante's Divine Comedy. If Sin had knowingly presented a Korean-ized Divine Comedy as an authentic work of Korean fiction, it would be an adulteration of the minjok historiography project by Sin's own standards of ethno-cultural autonomy. Whether or not Sin even read Dante's Divine Comedy is purely speculative.

== Bibliography ==
Sin Ch'aeho wrote at least 12 novels and 28 poems (17 Chinese, 3 Sijo style); he also wrote essays on literary criticism, articles published in newspapers and journals, historical books, and a translation of Three Great Founders of Italy from Chinese into Korean.

Title	Romanization	Publisher	Date
Liang Qichao (梁啓超), Story of Three Heroes in Building Italy, or Three Great Founders of Italy (意大利建國三傑傳) (trans. Chinese to Korean)	Yìdàlì jiànguó sān jié chuán (Pinyin)	Kwanghak Sŏp'o	1907
Relationship Between History and Patriotism		Taehan Association Monthly Magazine	1908
Two Principles of History		Taehan Maeil Sinbo	1908
The Hero Yi Sun-sin		Taehan Maeil Sinbo	1908
New History Reader (Note: Reprinted in “Youth” magazine in 1910 under the title Kuksa Saron (An Unofficial View of Korean History).)	Doksa Sinron, or Doksa Sillon	Taehan Maeil Sinbo	
Four Thousand Year History of the Great East	Taedong Sach'ŏnnyŏn Sa		1908
General Ŭlchi Mundŏk	Kwanghak Sŏp'o		1908
The Tale of the Chivalrous Ch'oe Tot'ong of the Eastern State, or The Biography of Choe Do-tong, Giant in the Eastern Country	Tongguk Kŏgŏl Ch'oe Tot'ong Chŏn		1909
The Oriental Italy		Taehan Maeil Sinbo	1909
Questions Regarding the History of Korea	Non Ryŏsa Mup'il	Taehan Maeil Sinbo	1909
Historical Anecdotes	Kuksa-ŭi Ilsa	Taehan Maeil Sinbo	1909
A Study of the Ancient Sŏnkyo Religion of the Eastern State	Tongguk Kodae Sŏnkyo Ko	Taehan Maeil Sinbo	1910
A Brief History of Korean Autonomy			1910
The Introduction to Ancient History of Tan'gun	Tangi Kosa Chungka Sŏ		1912
Ancient History of Korea	Chosŏn Sanggo Sa	Unpublished (draft)	1915
Dream Heaven, Heaven seen in a Dream, or The Dream Sky	Kkum hanŭl	Unpublished (Note: Published posthumously by The Club of Commemoration for Tanjae Sin Ch’ae-ho (ed.) in Series of Sin Ch'ae-ho (Seoul: Hyungseol, 1995).)	1915
History of Korea	Chosŏn Sa		1918
A Compendium of Korean History	Chosŏn Sa T'ongron	Unpublished	1919–1922 (est)
Culture	Munhwa P'yŏn	Unpublished	1919–1922 (est)
Ideological Changes	Sasang Pyŏnch'ŏn P'yŏn	Unpublished	1919–1922 (est)
A Study of Geography	Kwangyŏk Ko	Unpublished	1919–1922 (est)
Declaration of Korean Revolution	Chosŏn Hyŏkmyŏng Sŏnŏn	Unpublished	1923
Changes in Korea's Ancient Literature and Poetry			1924
On the Method of Interpreting Nouns Described by the Idu System			1924
Idu-mun Myŏngsa Haesŏk-pŏp	Idu-mun Myŏngsa Haesŏk-pŏp	The Dong-A Ilbo	1925
New Year's Free Notes by a Wanderer			1925
Comparative Study of East and West in the “Historical Records of the Three Kingdoms	Samkuk Saki Chung Tongsŏ Yangja Sanghwan Kojŭng	The Dong-A Ilbo	1925
An Amendment to the Story of Tong'i in Samkikchi	Samkukchi Tong'ijŏ Kyojŏng	Unpublished	1925
A Study of P'yŏngyang's River Water, or An Inquiry into the River Paesu in Pyeongyang	Pyŏngyang P'aesu Ko	The Dong-A Ilbo	1925
A Study of the Three Hans in Sequence, or An Inquiry into the Former and Latter Three Han States	Chŏnhu Samhan Ko	The Dong-A Ilbo	1924–1925 (est)
The Biggest Incident in One Thousand Years in Korean History	Chosŏn Yŏksasang Ilch'ŏnnyŏnnae Cheil Taesakŏn	The Dong-A Ilbo	1925
King Chatae Who Held Hist Father Under Detention	Purŭl Suhan Ch'adaewang	Shidae Ilbo	1926
On the Chronology of Koguryŏ and Silla	Kokuryŏ-wa Silla Kŏnguk Yŏndae-e Taehayŏ	Shidae Ilbo	1926
Taekaya Ch'ŏn'guk Ko	Taekaya Ch'ŏn'guk Ko	Unpublished	1927
Chŏng In-hong kong Yakchŏn	Chŏng In-hong kong Yakchŏn	Unpublished	1927
Legends of Ancient Korea	Chŏson-ŭi Kodae Sinhwa	Unpublished	1927
The Great Battle of Two Dragons, or The War of the Dragons	Yong kwa yong ŭi taegyŏkchŏn		1928
Exploratory Studies in Korean History	Joseonsa yongu cho		1930
The History of Korea (Note: Reprinted in 1948 under the title “The Ancient History of Korea”.)		The Chosun Ilbo	1931–1932 (SP)
Cultural History of Ancient Korea		The Chosun Ilbo	1931
To Whom the Great Wall of China Belongs		The Chosun Ilbo	1932
A Study of the History of Tan'gun			
Best Years of the Korean People		The Chosun Ilbo	1932
The Year of the Death of General Yŏn'gae Somun			
Some Questions Regarding the History of Korea	Chosŏn-sa Chŏngni-e Taehun Saŭi		1920–1929 (est)
The Vicissitudes of the Dae Gaya		Unpublished	
A Brief Biography of Jeong In-hong		Unpublished	
An appeal to Chosun cultural history or Myth of the Tangun	Chosŏn sango munhwasa		
Collected works of Sin Ch'aeho, or The Complete Works of Sin "Tanje" Ch'ae-ho, in 3 Volumes	Tanje Sin Ch'ae-ho chŏnjip, 3 gwon	Ulsa Munhwasa	1978 (PPH)

== See also ==
- Gustav Landauer, the German Jewish anarchist, borrowed the German nationalist (völkisch) element.
- Independence Club
- Korea under Japanese rule
- Korean independence movement
