= Kyongbuk Maeil Shinmun =

South Korean daily regional newspaper

- Founded: 1989; 37 years ago
- Language: Korean
- Headquarters: Pohang, South Korea

Korean name
- Hangul: 경북매일신문
- Hanja: 慶北每日新聞
- RR: Gyeongbuk maeil sinmun
- MR: Kyŏngbuk maeil sinmun

The Kyongbuk Maeil Shinmun (Korean: 경북매일신문) is a Korean-language daily newspaper serving North Gyeongsang Province, in eastern South Korea. It is headquartered in the coastal city of Pohang, but has correspondents through the province and the adjoining city of Daegu. Founded in 1989, it published its first issue in 1990. The CEO is Kim Gi-ho.

The Kyongbuk Maeil Shinmun is published 5 days a week, Monday through Friday, with an expanded 24-page Friday edition.

== See also ==
- List of newspapers
