= Sinhanch'on =

1911–1937 Korean enclave in Vladivostok

Sinhanch'on 신한촌
- Ethnic enclave
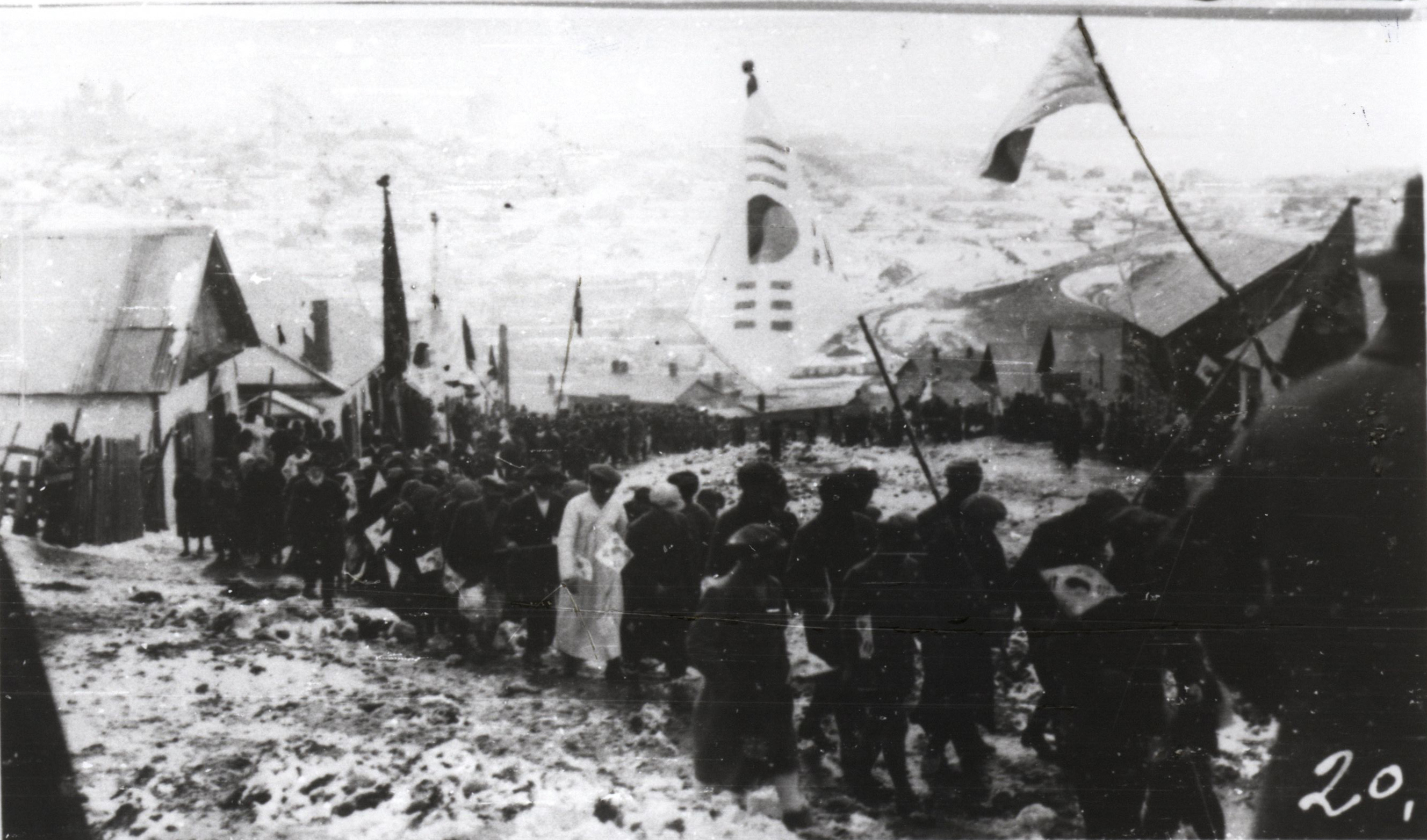
- March First Movement anniversary protests in Vladivostok, possibly in Sinhanch'on (1920).
- Interactive map of Sinhanch'on
- Coordinates: 43°08′06″N 131°53′43″E
- Establishment: 1911
- Deportation of Koreans in the Soviet Union: 1937

Sinhanch'on (Note: Korean: 신한촌; Hanja: 新韓村; lit. 'New Korea Village'; Russian: Синханчхон; Новая Корейская Слободка. Also known as Sin'gaech'ŏk-ri (Korean: 신개척리; Hanja: 新開拓里; lit. 'New Kaech'ŏk-ri').) was an enclave of Koreans in Vladivostok that existed between 1911 and 1937, during which time the city was controlled for periods by the Russian Empire, Far Eastern Republic and finally the Soviet Union. The enclave was not the only one to use this name; several other Korean settlements in Primorskaya Oblast and Jiandao ("Gando" in Korean) went by this name.

It holds an important place in the history of Koryo-saram (ethnic Koreans of the mainland former Soviet Union), and is now widely considered to have been a hub of the Korean independence movement. It hosted the first Korean provisional government, the Korean Independence Army Government. This organization secretly built an army intended to fight for Korea's liberation. These efforts were suppressed by both Russia and Japan, which culminated in a 1920 massacre known as the Sinhanch'on Incident.

Vladivostok had a Korean population of around 10,000 from the mid-1910s until 1937, when the Koreans were forcibly deported to Central Asia. Few visible traces of the enclave remain today. A small memorial park on Khabarovskaya Ulitsa now exists near its former entrance.

== Background ==
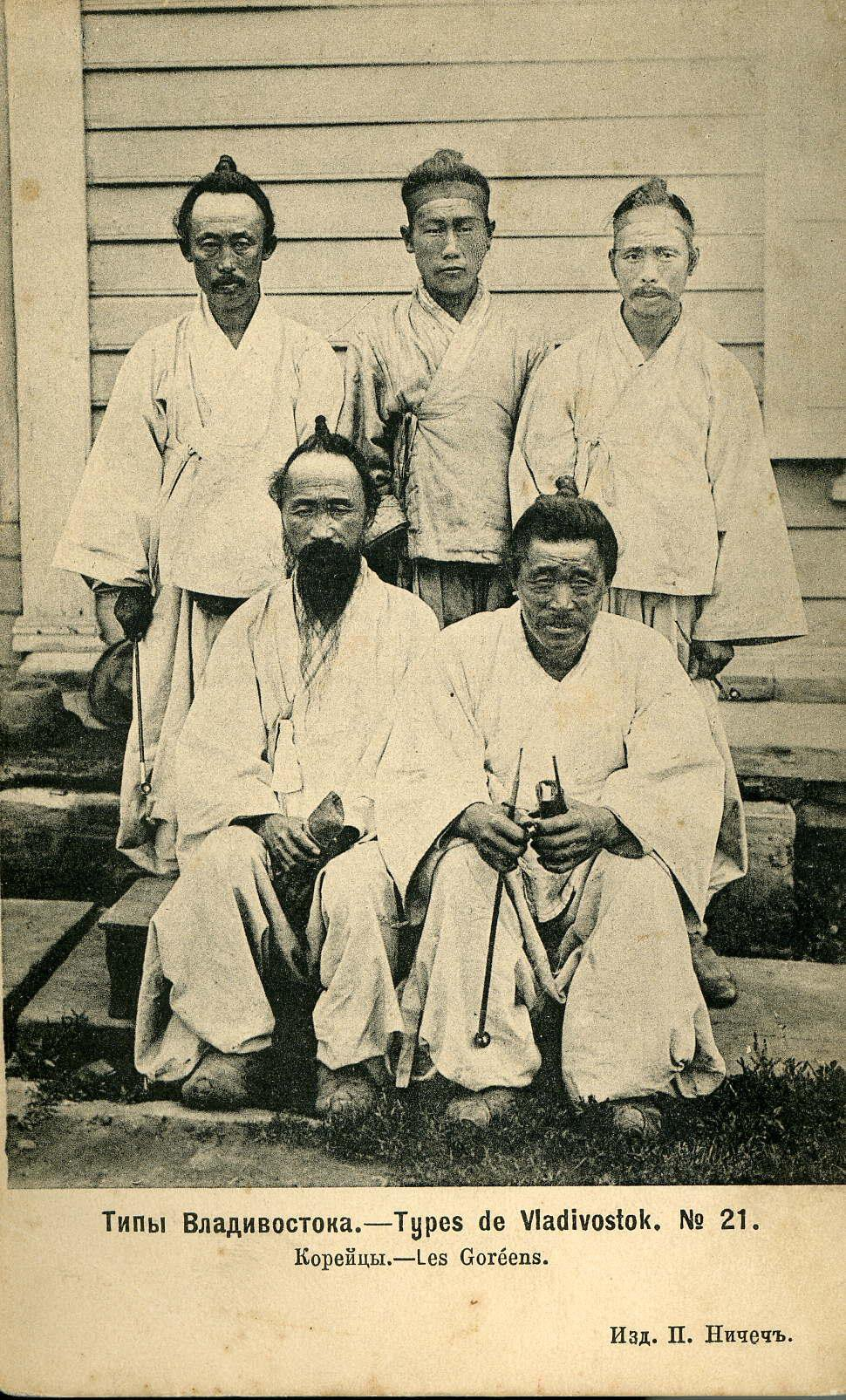
Koreans wearing white in Vladivostok, early 1900s

Before the late 19th century, few Koreans left the Korean peninsula. Koreans occasionally ventured out into what is now Primorsky Krai to gather resources, but did not migrate there in significant numbers until a famine happened in Korea in 1869. The first Koreans arrived in Vladivostok around 1870. In 1886, their population was 400; this number more than doubled to 840 by 1891.

=== Forced relocations ===
The Koreans of Vladivostok initially settled in the city center, but were relocated to the suburbs by the city authorities. The Koreans congregated in an area they called Kaech'ŏk-ri (개척리; 開拓里; now around the intersection of Ulitsa Pologaya and Pogranichnaya Ulitsa). In recognition of their presence there, the local Vladivostok government named what is now Pogranichnaya Ulitsa to "Kareiskaya Ulitsa" (lit. 'Korean Street'); this name persisted until 1941.

In 1892, a plan was approved for the Koreans and other East Asians to again be relocated. The plan called for the creation of a settlement for Chinese and Korean people 2 km (1.2 mi) away from Kaech'ŏk-ri in the northwest outskirts of the city. Koreans were more willing to obey the order than Chinese people, and began gradually moving over. In 1911, Kaech'ŏk-ri was forcefully emptied of Koreans, and military facilities were installed in the area. This was done under the pretext of combatting an outbreak of cholera, although this justification has since been doubted by South Korean historians.

== History ==
The Korean settlers dubbed their new settlement "Sin'gaech'ŏk-ri" (lit. 'New Kaech'ŏk-ri') or "Sinhanch'on". The enclave was not the only one to use this name; several other Korean settlements in Primorskaya Oblast and Jiandao ("Gando" in Korean) went by this name. It was located on top of a small mountain, and was centered on what is now the street Khabarovskaya Ulitsa. (Note: Akulenko writes in a 2022 paper that old residents of the city still called the streets Khabarovskaya and Amurskaya "Koreyka", in reference to their former association with the Koreans.) Initially, conditions in the enclave were poor, as many constructed and lived in temporary shelters. The community soon developed, and built around 200 wood and stone houses. Buildings and infrastructure combined elements of Korean and Russian architecture and planning. Houses and streets were constructed in the Russian style, though they still incorporated elements of traditional Korean architecture; some incorporated ondol heated floors and had kitchens or separate facilities for gamasot (cauldrons).

Korean culture and language continued to flourish in the community. A Korean-language school called Hanmin Hakkyo (한민학교; 韓民學校) was established in March 1912. While not directly inside of the enclave, local Korean universities such as the Chŏson College of Education (조선사범대학) and Wŏndong Korean College of Education (원동고려사범대) served the community. Korean-language newspapers like Kwŏnŏp sinmun and Koryo Ilbo were published in Vladivostok for the community, with Koryo Ilbo still publishing today. A theatre company was founded, which now operates in Kazakhstan as the Korean Theatre. A community organization called the Sinhanch'on People's Assembly (신한촌민회; 新韓村民會) represented the community and organized the creation of various services and amenities for Koreans.

=== Korean independence movement ===
Around the time of the 1910 annexation of Korea, Sinhanch'on served as a hub for the Korean independence movement. Koreans moved to the area in significant quantities. The population in 1911 was 1,500, but by 1915 it was around 10,000. As it developed, it became a center for Koreans in the region, and was even dubbed the "Seoul of the Russian Far East" (원동의 서울).

The organization Kwŏnŏphoe was founded on June 1, 1911, in Sinhanch'on. On the surface, the group was meant to serve as a regional body for Koreans across Primorskaya Oblast that forwarded agriculture, commerce, industry, and education. Secretly, the group funded and supported the Korean independence movement. It established Korea's first provisional government-in-exile, the Korean Independence Army Government, and gradually began secretly building an army, in part by misusing local government grants, to fight for Korea's liberation. These activities drew the attention of the Empire of Japan, which established a consulate around 1 km away from the enclave. With the rise of World War I in 1914, Russia and Japan established agreements to suppress and extradite Korean independence activists in Vladivostok, which led to the movement being greatly suppressed.

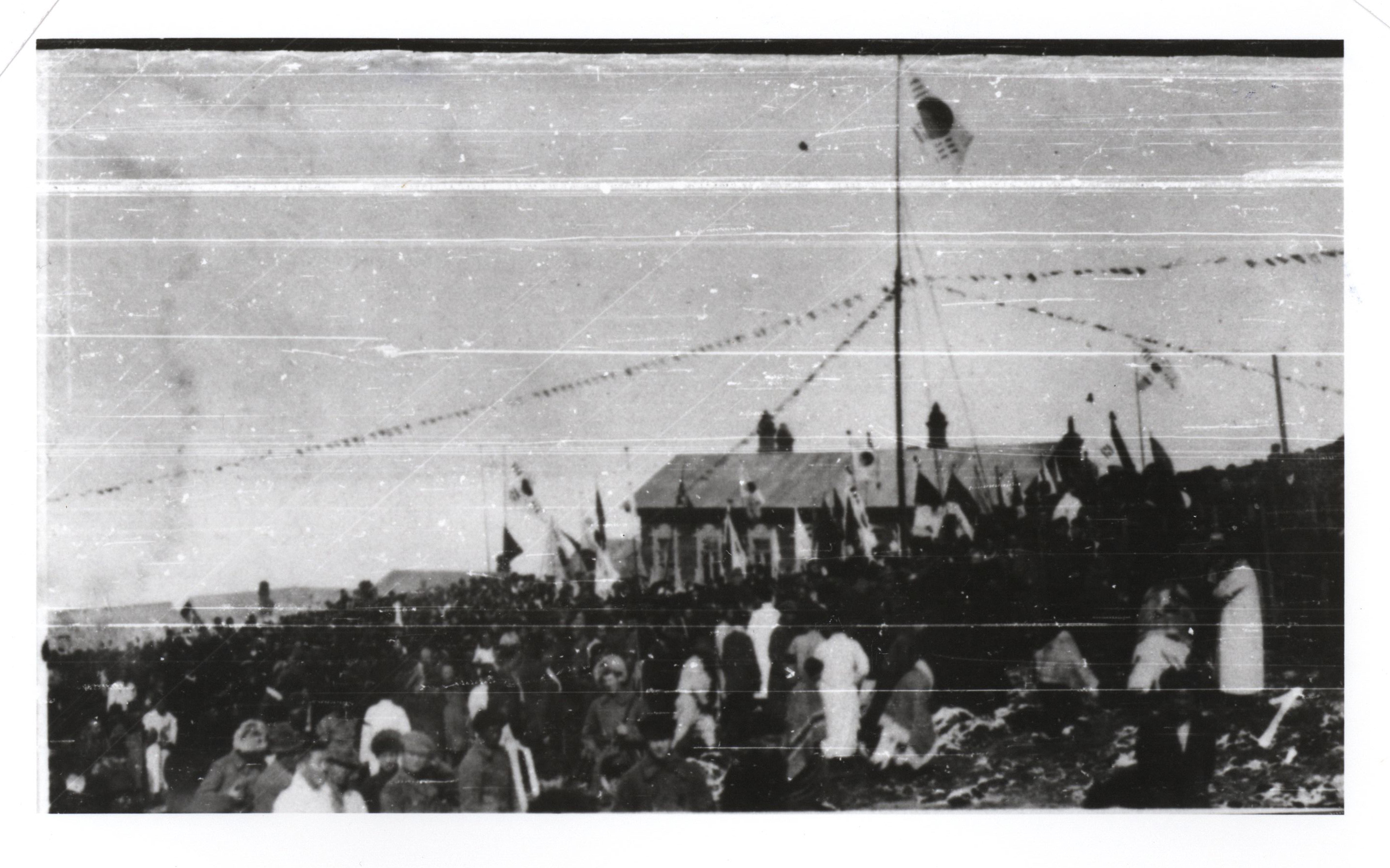
March First Movement anniversary protests in Vladviostok (1920)

After the March First Movement protests in Korea began in 1919, news of the protests reached Sinhanch'on by March 8. The news was celebrated, and Koreans there scheduled their own peaceful protest for March 15. Under Japanese pressure, Russian authorities declared martial law and ordered that no protests be held. Elsewhere in the province, in Ussuriysk a protest was held and suppressed on March 17. In support of this, that same day, Koreans in Sinhanch'on closed their businesses for the day, and a group of young Koreans distributed translated copies of the Korean Declaration of Independence to the local Japanese consulate, government buildings, and consulates beginning around 3 p.m. At 4 p.m., they held a rally and public march that distributed copies of the declaration and eventually made its way downtown by 6 p.m. The rally was suppressed by 7:30 p.m., and many of its members were arrested. Protests continued the following day; Korean workers struck and another rally was held in Sinhanch'on.

In April 1920, amidst the Russian Civil War and spiking Japan–Bolshevik tensions, Japanese soldiers conducted a massacre of Korean civilians in Sinhanch'on in what is now remembered as the "Sinhanch'on Incident" or "April Disaster". It is not known how many were killed, although one estimate puts the number at several hundred. Buildings were burnt down and looted during the raid. In the aftermath of the incident, numerous independence activists fled the enclave, with a number congregating in Shanghai to join the Korean Provisional Government.

Pro-independence sentiment was not uniform in the community. Some Koreans, while not necessarily actively pro-Japanese, saw value in aligning with Japan to improve their living situations. Around the time of the civil war, groups like the Sinhanch'on Korean People's Association (신한촌 조선인민회) and Sinhanch'on East Village Korean People's Association (신한촌 동촌 조선인민회) formed around these ideologies. These organizations disbanded in late 1922 after the Japanese army withdrew and the Bolsheviks took control of the city.

Thereafter, independence activism was allowed greater freedom by the Soviet Union. On each anniversary of the March First Movement, a feast and rally was held. Korean independence activists of the region attended the event. Militant Korean independence activism was discouraged. The movement's strength in Vladivostok also declined after the June 1921 Free City Incident.

=== Later history and end ===
The community came to an end in 1937, amidst the forced relocation of Koreans to Central Asia. The residents were reportedly given just 24 hours notice before their eviction. The Korean population of Vladivostok at the time was 7,994 (4,236 men and 3,758 women). Among them, only 3,408 lived in the enclave itself. Afterwards, the community was virtually deserted, and came to be taken over by Russian residents.

== Legacy ==
The enclave holds an important historical place in both the Korean independence movement and the history of Koryo-saram. Important independence activists, such as Ch'oe Chaehyŏng, Yi Dong-hwi, Yi Sang Sul, Hong Beom-do, and Chŏng Sangjin lived in or were from the enclave.

Few traces of the enclave now remain. A gate with red wooden pillars and a sign reading "Independence Gate" (독립문) once stood at the entrance of the enclave, but is now lost; only photos of it remain. In 2008, a South Korean reporter contrasted the fact that the Japanese consulate building where Korean independence activists had been tortured and killed still remained, while sites of the Korean independence movement in the area are now lost.

Many early photographs of Koreans in the enclave were taken by the American photographer Eleanor Pray, who lived in Vladivostok for 36 years. Many of these photos and other resources on the enclave are held at the Vladimir K. Arseniev Museum of Far East History.

=== Sinhanch'on Memorial ===
A small park and Sinhanch'on Memorial (신한촌 기념탑) stand near the former site of the enclave; these were completed on August 15, 1999 by the Institute of Overseas Korean Affairs (해외한민족연구소). The monument consists of three white pillars and eight stones around them. The middle pillar symbolizes South Korea, the left North Korea, and the right the Korean diaspora. The eight stones represent the traditional Eight Provinces of Korea. For years, the park was described by multiple people as frequently locked and inaccessible to visitors. A Yonhap News Agency reporter wrote in January 2023 that the monument had never been properly registered with the government, and that it was unknown who currently managed it. The reporter reached out to the Korean embassy and local Vladivostok government on the issue. After an investigation into the matter, on April 22, the Vladivostok government announced that it would assume ownership over the monument and take charge of its maintenance.

=== Other memorials ===
A monument to An Jung-geun used to exist in the city, but was relocated to the Ussuriysk Korean Cultural Center. Since 2006, there has been a monument to writer Cho Myŏnghŭi in a park next to Aksakovskaya Ulitsa. It was restored in 2017 amidst renewed interest after the visit of South Korean president Moon Jae-in. A house at the northern end of the nearby Amur Street has a unique street address "Seoul Street" (Сеульская улица; Seul'skaya Ulitsa) which dates from the Sinhanch'on period. In 2014, a memorial was established in the original Kaech'ŏk-ri location that is written only in Cyrillic.

== See also ==
- Category:Koryo-saram communities
- Category:Korean communities in Russia
