= The Korea Daily News =

1904–1910 English- and Korean-language newspaper

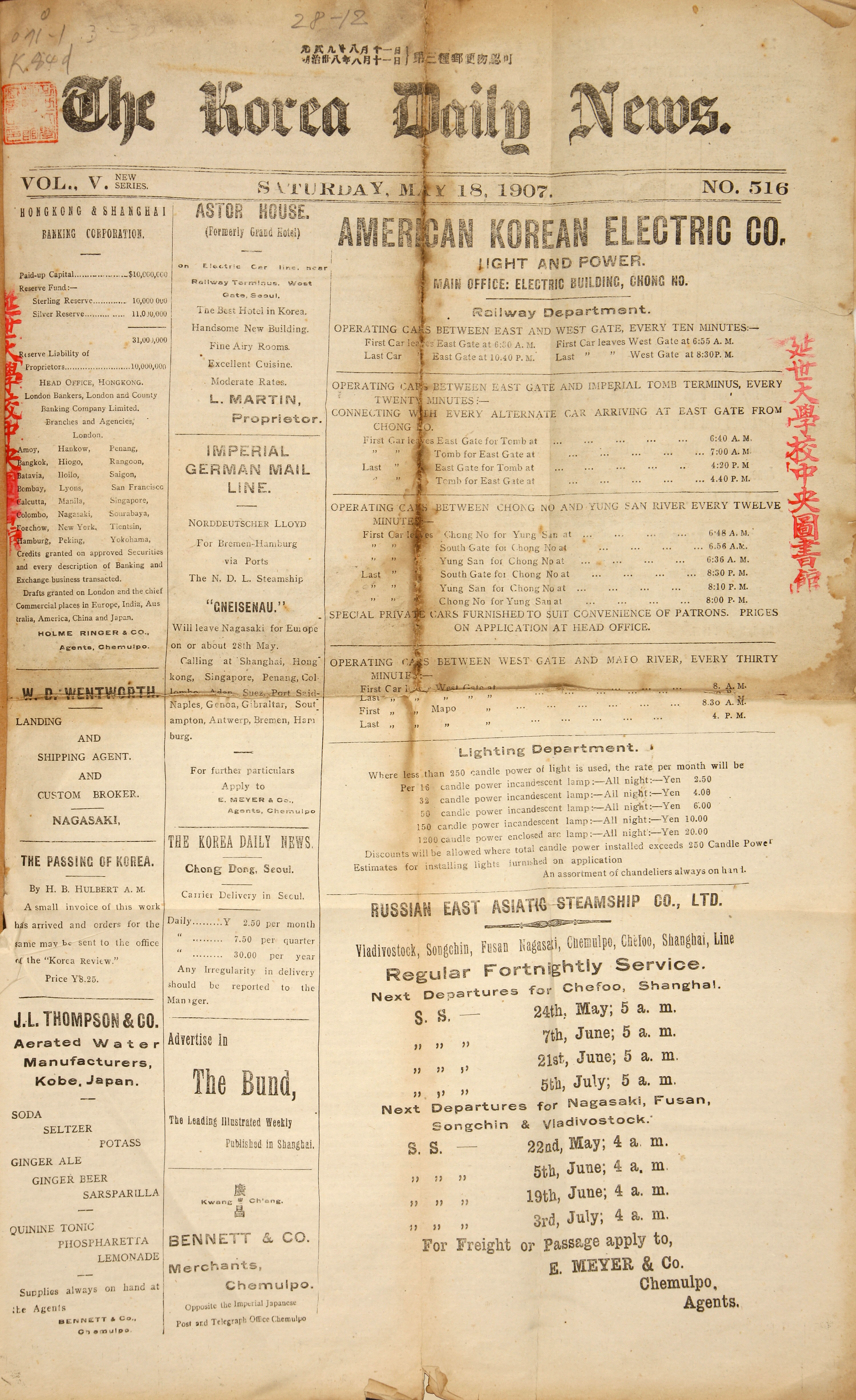
- First page of the 18 May 1907, English-language edition
- Type: Daily newspaper
- Format: Broadsheet
- Founder(s): Ernest Bethell, Yang Gi-tak
- Founded: 18 July 1904
- Ceased publication: 28 August 1910
- Language: English, Korean
- Headquarters: Seoul, Korean Empire
- Circulation: 13,256 (peak, across every language edition, May 1908)

The Korea Daily News was an English-language newspaper published in the Korean Empire between 1904 and 1910. It also published editions in Korean mixed script and Hangul under the name Taehan maeil sinbo (Korean: 대한매일신보; Hanja: 大韓每日申報).

After a few trial issues under the name Korea Times, the newspaper formally launched as the Daily News on 18 July 1904. It was published by Ernest Bethell, a British citizen who sharply criticized the Empire of Japan's rapid encroachment on Korean sovereignty. After Tokyo began indirectly ruling Korea in 1905, Bethell was one of the only newspaper publishers able to write critically about Japan, although he and the newspaper were subject to increasing retaliation.

The newspaper was sold after Bethell's death in 1909 and became an organ of the colonial government called Maeil sinbo. It was published until the 1945 liberation of Korea, when it was seized by the United States occupying force and reorganized into today's Seoul Shinmun.

Some issues of the English and most of the Korean issues are freely available on the Korean Newspaper Archive website.

== History ==
=== Establishment ===
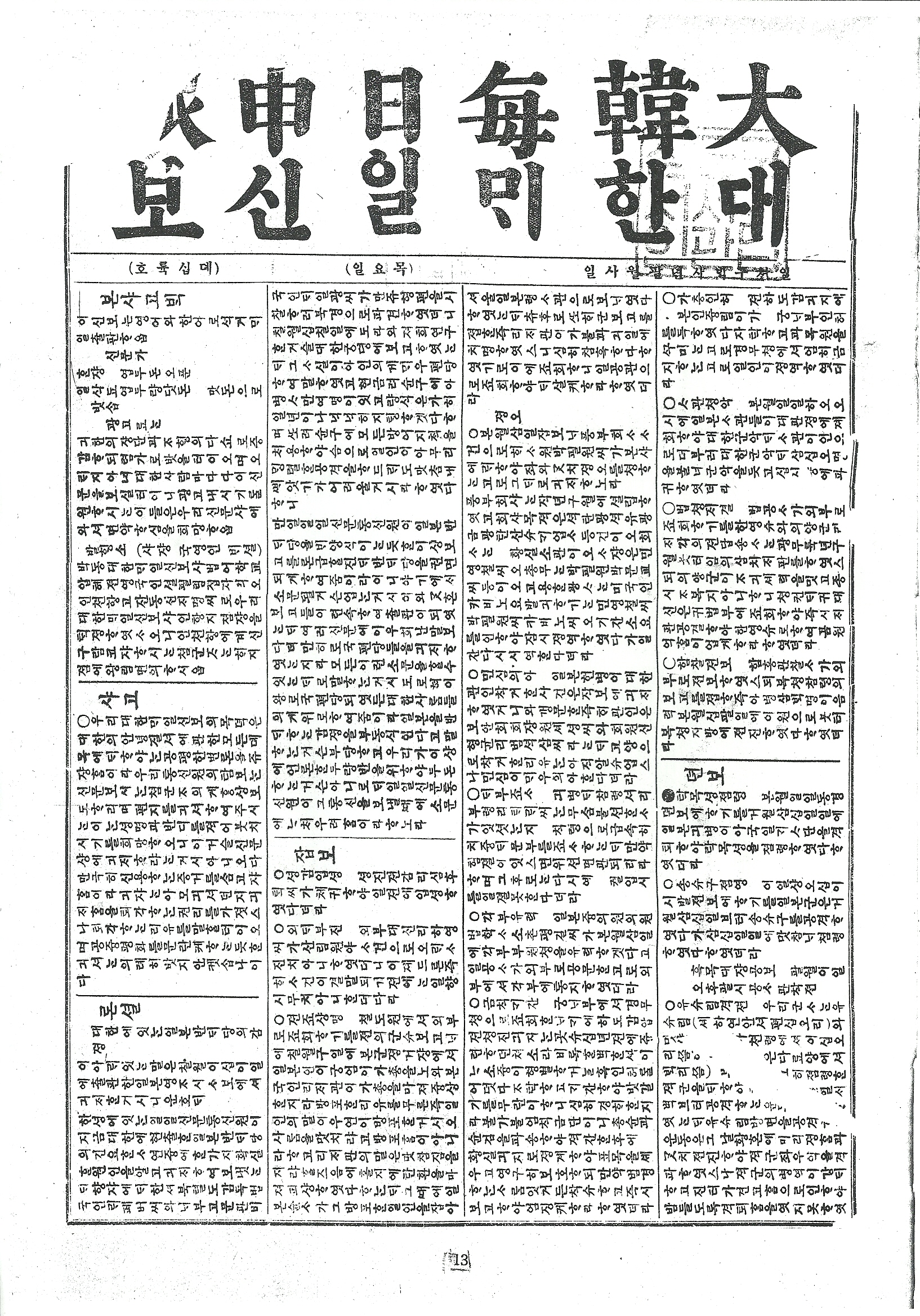
Cover page for the first issue of Taehan maeil sinbo (4 August 1904)

In 1904, British journalists Ernest Bethell and Thomas Cowen were sent to Korea to report for the British newspaper Daily Chronicle. Around this time, Japan was stepping up its encroachment into Korean sovereignty. After being fired from the paper, Bethell and Cowen began planning to publish their own paper tentatively called the Korea Times (different from later The Korea Times). However, Cowen was secretly supportive of Japan and, unbeknownst to Bethell, warned the Japanese government of the paper's founding.

The pair, along with Korean independence activist Yang Gi-tak, published the first trial issue of the Korea Times, completely in English, on June 29, 1904. Shortly afterwards, Cowen quit the paper and left for Japan, and the paper changed its name to The Korea Daily News. The first non-trial issue under the new name was published on 18 July 1904. The issue had six pages, with two in Korean (in mixed script) and four in English.

How exactly the newspaper was financed is unknown. Emperor Gojong did finance Bethell by transferring funds through Antoinette Sontag, owner of the Sontag Hotel. Some theorized that Bethell was funded by the Russian Empire, Japan's rivals for Korean sovereignty, although Bethell dismissed this idea. Funding was still insufficient; in March 1905, printing of the paper was suspended as he went to Japan to buy a printer and try to raise money. By 11 August, printing resumed, this time with separate Korean and English editions.

=== Growth and attention from Japan ===
After Korea was forced to sign the Japan–Korea Treaty of 1905 in November, Japanese control over the peninsula increased. Newspapers were then censored by the Japanese Resident-General of Korea. Bethell, as a British citizen, was able to dodge Japanese censorship and continue publishing newspapers. However, he was frequently harassed by the Japanese. The contemporary Canadian journalist Frederick Arthur MacKenzie wrote:

The Japanese were making his life as uncomfortable as they possibly could, and were doing everything to obstruct his work. His mail was constantly tampered with; his servants were threatened or arrested on various excuses, and his household was subjected to the closest espionage. He displayed surprising tenacity, and held on month after month without showing any sign of yielding.

Gojong and other Koreans praised Bethell and saw him as a hero. On 10 February 1906, Gojong gave Bethell a handwritten note, putting him in charge of communications and the press of the empire and subsidizing his expenses.

On 21 February 1907, The Korea Daily News published a letter that launched the National Debt Repayment Movement: a grassroots effort to pay off Korea's debts to Japan in a bid to avoid Japanese encroachment. The newspaper became the main champion of the campaign. Its staff formed an association (국채보상지원금총합소) to manage donations it received. That May, they offered to house Ahn Chang Ho's New People's Association, sheltering it under Bethell's immunity from Japanese persecution.

The Korea Daily News established an entirely Hangul version of the newspaper on 23 May 1907, alongside the original version that was written in both Hanja and Hangul. In August, when the Korean Empire's army was forcefully disbanded, impromptu militias dubbed "righteous armies" arose in armed rebellion. The newspaper devoted much of its reporting around this time to their activities, and urged civilians to join the fight. By 27 May 1908, circulation of the paper reached 13,256 copies (8,143 in mixed script, 4,650 in Hangul, and 463 in English), more than all other newspapers in Korea combined.

In 1907, the Japanese published the Newspaper Act, which was partially targeted at the paper, and placed various restrictions on Koreans purchasing it. Bethell was arrested and tried by the British twice by request of the Japanese government. He transferred ownership of the paper to his assistant editor Alfred W. Marnham, who carried on reporting critically of Japan. Bethell eventually won his second trial at the British Supreme Court for China in December 1908 and defiantly immediately returned to continue reporting. However, he died several months afterwards, likely due to his unhealthy lifestyle and stress from his imprisonments. His last words were reportedly "Even if I may die, The Korea Daily News will live on and help the Korean people". (Note: 『나는 죽을지라도 대한매일신보는 영생(永生)케 해 한민족을 구하라.』)

=== End and rename to Maeil sinbo ===
On 21 May 1910, Marnham folded under joint British and Japanese pressure. He secretly sold the newspaper to former employee Yi Changhun (이장훈; 李章薰) for 40,000 won in gold and left the country. The 14 June 1910 edition—the paper's 1408th issue—reflects this, with Lee's name given as editor. Yang and other Korean independence activists resigned and denounced the paper publicly as a propaganda piece. The paper stopped publishing in English and became strictly controlled by Japan. Its final issue was the 1461st mixed-script and 938th Hangul issue. It changed its name to Maeil sinbo (매일신보; 每日申報) on 30 August 1910, and it was integrated into the Keijō nippō thereafter.

== See also ==
- List of newspapers in Korea – list of pre-1945 newspapers, including Japanese
- History of newspapers in Korea – prose history of newspapers in Korea
