= Jeong-sik =

- Hangul: 정식
- RR: Jeongsik
- MR: Chŏngsik

Jeong-sik, also spelled Jung-sik or Jong-sik, is a Korean given name.

Notable people with the name include:

- Cho Jeong-sik (born 1963), South Korean politician
- Kim Sowol (born Kim Jeong-sik, 1902–1934), Korean poet
- Kim Jeong-sik (born 1981), stage name DJ Tukutz, South Korean DJ and producer, member of Epik High
- Lee Jeong-sik (born 1963), South Korean gymnast
- Won Jeong-sik (born 1990), South Korean weightlifter
- An Jung-sik (1861–1919), Joseon Dynasty artist
- Lee Jung-sik (born 1995), South Korean actor and model
- Moon Jung-sik (1930–2006), South Korean football player and manager
- Park Jung-sik (born 1983), South Korean football player
- Park Jung-sik (footballer, born 1988), South Korean football player

== See also ==
- List of Korean given names
