= Park Rehyun =

South Korean painter (1920–1976)

- 박래현 (朴崍賢)
- Born: April 13, 1920; Jinnampo, Heian'nan-dō, Korea, Empire of Japan (now Nampo, South Pyongan Province, North Korea)
- Died: January 2, 1976 (aged 55); Seoul, South Korea
- Education: Tokyo Women's School of Fine Arts
- Spouse: Kim Ki-chang
- Family: 4 children

- Park Rehyun
- Hangul: 박래현
- Hanja: 朴崍賢
- RR: Bak Raehyeon
- MR: Pak Raehyŏn

Art name
- Hangul: 우향
- Hanja: 雨鄕
- RR: Uhyang
- MR: Uhyang

Park Rehyun (Korean: 박래현; Hanja: 朴崍賢, 1920–1976) was a Korean painter. She is regarded as a pioneer of modern Korean art during the late Japanese Colonial period and the following decades.

== Biography ==
Park was born in Jinnampo, Heian'nan-dō, Korea, Empire of Japan (now in North Korea). She graduated from Keijō High School in 1937 and entered the Tokyo Women's School of Fine Arts in 1941.

Park married a celebrated artist, Kim Ki-chang, with whom she presented exhibitions and private showcases, helped highlight her work though she was already beginning her journey by herself. Her works sought to use oriental materials to provide for western-style artwork. A pioneering woman painter, she rejected prejudices against women and completed her own paintings with passion.

Her youngest daughter, who is a nun in South Korea, said in an interview that she had spent her life as a good mother, as well as a committed painter and wife.

In 1976, Park died of liver cancer at her residence in Seongbuk District, Seoul.

== Works ==
She made her debut by being accepted to the Chōsen Art Exhibition in 1943. Later, she was awarded the first prize given by the President of the Republic of Korea and grand prize in the National Art exhibition of Korea, gaining her wider attention.

She participated in domestic art exhibitions until the early 1960s but she started to broaden her stage internationally in this period. As a member of Baekyanghoe, the first group made in 1957 for oriental painting artists in Korea after 1945 (the year that Korea became independent from Japan), she started exhibit her works at the Baek-yanghoe group exhibitions held in Taipei (February 1960), Hongkong (February to March 1960), and Tokyo and Osaka (January 1961). Also she flew to São Paulo Biennale as an official South Korean delegate in 1967. After finishing her work, she visited several nations in Latin America, including Mexico, then studied tapestry and printmaking in New York City since 1969. She learned printmaking techniques at the Pratt Graphic Art Center and the Robert Blackburn Printmaking Workshop.

Briefly, her works can be separated into 4 time periods. The first (1940s) concentrated on Japanese paintings and figure paintings. The second (1950s) challenged her own work with traditional materials of oriental painting in a western-drawing manner; her pieces at this time produced half-abstract paintings by interpreting cubism and partition of the canvas in an analytic method. The third phase (1960s) began experimenting abstractionism, and the fourth period (1970s) made use of tapestry and printmaking skills in creative drawing.

== Notes ==
- 韓國現代作家十人 (吳光洙, 悅話堂, 1977)
- 雨鄕 朴崍賢 (庚美文化社, 1978)
- Korean Artists: Park Re-hyun (Samsung Foundation of Culture, 1997)
- Park Rehyun: Triple Interpreter (National Museum of Modern and Contemporary Art, 2021)
