= Kim Eun-ho =

Kim Eun-ho may refer to:

- Kim Eun-ho (painter) (1892—1979), Korean painter
- Kim Eun-ho (skier) (born 1996), South Korean cross-country skier
