= Taishōkan =

1912–1935 movie theater in Korea

- 大正館
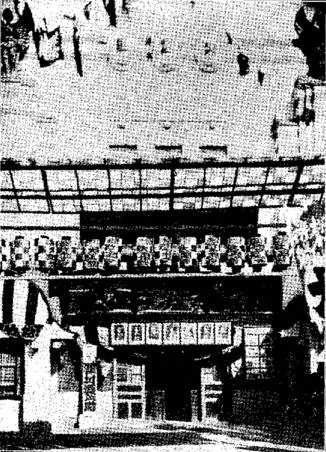
- Entrance to the theater (1922)
- Interactive map of Taishōkan
- Alternative names: 대정관; Taejŏnggwan; Daejeonggwan

General information
- Type: Movie theater
- Location: Sakuraicho 1-chōme, Keijō, Korea, Empire of Japan now 26 Inhyeon-dong 1-ga, Seoul, South Korea
- Coordinates: 37.5660°N 126.9948°E
- Named for: Emperor Taishō
- Opened: November 7, 1912
- Closed: December 16, 1935

Taishōkan (Japanese: 大正館; Korean: 대정관; RR: Daejeonggwan; MR: Taejŏnggwan) was a movie theater in Keijō (Seoul), Korea, Empire of Japan. It operated between 1912 and 1935. It was located at Sakuraicho 1-chōme (櫻井町1丁目; now 26 Inhyeon-dong 1-ga). In 1914, the building was renamed Dai-ichi Taishōkan (第一大正館) after the building's owner acquired a second building that they named Dai-ni Taishōkan.

== History ==
The theater was established shortly after the beginning of the 1910 to 1945 Japanese colonial period in Korea. It was connected with the business family of patriarch Nita Matabe (新田又兵衛). Nita's four sons all moved to Korea, and operated or assisted with operating the family's various businesses there. The movie theater's founding owner was third son Koichi (新田耕市), who was assisted by younger brother Shukichi (新田秀吉). They initially intended to name the theater Yūraku-kan (遊楽; lit. 'amusement house'), but around that time, Japanese Emperor Taishō ascended to the throne. They decided to name the theater in the emperor's honor.

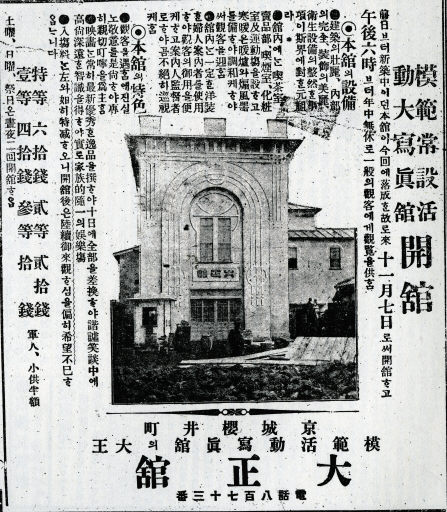
Announcement of the theater's opening, published in the Maeil Sinbo newspaper (November 8, 1912)

Taishōkan was established on November 7, 1912. It was mostly meant for Japanese audiences, and primarily screened films in the Japanese language. It attempted to differentiate itself with other theaters of the time using a variety of methods. It showed new films more frequently: every two weeks, compared to their competitors' standard of twice per month. They also priced their tickets cheaply, with pricing tiers for various qualities of seats (50 sen for special seats, 30 for 1st class, 20 for 2nd, 10 for 3rd). It also attempted to promote a clean, cutting edge, and modern image. Sanitation was a high priority, and it hired neatly-dressed female staff in modern Western clothing. Customers were receptive towards the theater, and began visiting it in great numbers.

Nita Koichi began moving to expand their business. He established a company, Nita Entertainment (新田演藝部), and quickly began establishing and acquiring more movie theaters across Korea. He created a film distribution network, and developed distribution contracts with small theaters. By 1913, they were able to buy out their main competitor, Keijō Kōtō Engeikan, which they renamed to Dai-ni Taishōkan (lit. 'Taishōkan No. 2'). Their original theater was renamed to Dai-ichi Taishōkan, and it served as their flagship theater in Korea.

Nita became interested in trading stocks in 1918. In May 1920, the Keijō Stock Exchange was established, and Nita handed over control of the movie theater business to his brothers so that he could focus on trading. However, the business soon suffered a setback, as Japanese movie companies acquired greater influence in Korea around the early 1920s. By January 1925, the Nita brothers sold off Taishōkan to a Fukuzaki Hamanosuke (福崎濱之助). Fukuzaki had no experience in the film business, and sought to hire more experienced management. However, the advent of sound films caused the facilities in the theater to become dated. Dissatisfied, Fukuzaki sold the theater again to film company PCL, which reopened the theater on November 15, 1934. The theater closed the following year, on December 16, 1935. The theater's properties were sold to the Scala Theatre, which opened a few weeks later on the 30th.
