= Kim Eun-ho (painter) =

20th century Korean painter

- 김은호
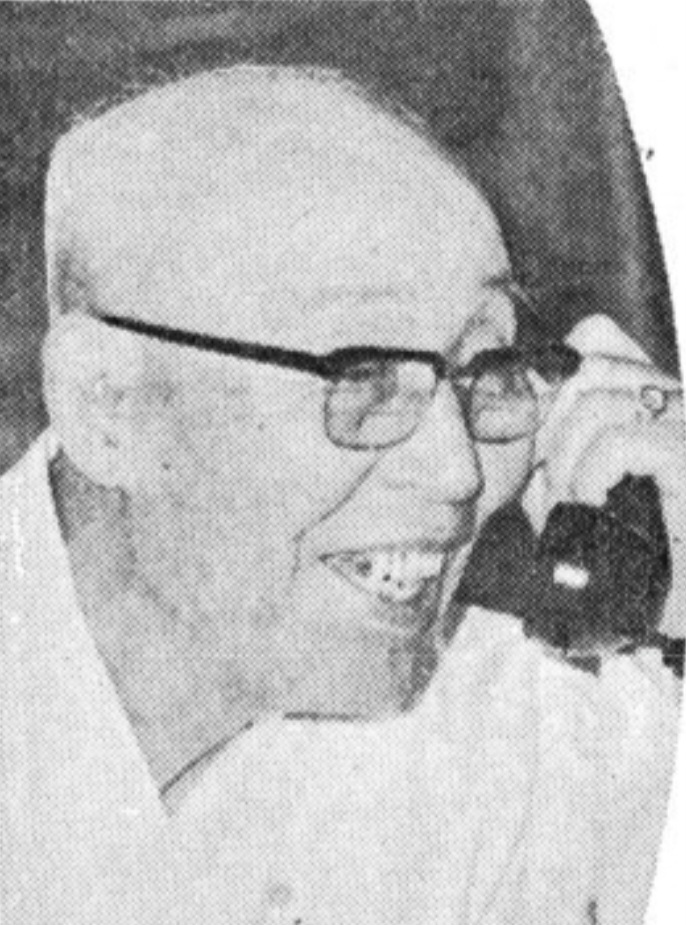
- Born: 24 June 1892; Incheon, Joseon Korea
- Died: 7 February 1979 (aged 86)
- Occupation: Painter

Korean name
- Hangul: 김은호
- Hanja: 金殷鎬
- RR: Gim Eunho
- MR: Kim Ŭnho

Art name
- Hangul: 이당
- Hanja: 以堂
- RR: Idang
- MR: Idang

Kim Eun-ho (Korean: 김은호; 1892–1979) was a Korean painter known for the skillful use of the nihonga style in his work. He was particularly active during the Japanese colonial period, recognized many times at the Joseon Art Exhibition. He remained influential throughout the twentieth century.

== Biography ==
Kim Eun-ho was born on June 24, 1892, in Haksan-ri, Bunae-myeon (modern-day Munhak-dong, Michuhol District), Incheon, Korea.

Kim joined the Kyongsong School of Calligraphy and Painting (경성서화미술원; 京城書畵美術院) as a student in 1912 at the age of 20 years. The Kyongsong School of Calligraphy and Painting was established by Yun Yeong-gi in 1911, where artists of the time like An Jung-Sik, Cho Suk-jin, Jeong Dae-yu, Kang Pil-ju, Kang Jin-hui, and Kim Eung-won taught ink painting and calligraphy to a new generation of modern Korean painters. Here Kim was given the art name 'Yee Dang' by An Jung-sik in 1913 and he graduated in 1915. The time spent at this school allowed Kim to pursue ink-wash painting under the masters in the field.

After graduating from the Kyongsong School of Calligraphy and Painting, Kim went on to attend the Tokyo School of Fine Arts from 1924 to 1927. The Tokyo School of Fine Arts, which later changed its name to Tokyo University of the Arts, was established in 1887 by Okakura Kakuzō and others. At the time, this school was the only institution that taught Western painting styles in an organized manner in East Asia and therefore had a large number of international students from China, Korea, and Taiwan. During this period Kim mastered the nihonga style. Nihonga, which means 'Japanese painting', was a new ink painting style that developed in response to the influx of Western-style 'yoga' in Japan.

After an industrious career, Kim died on February 7, 1979.

== Career ==
=== Painting style and subject matter ===
Kim was known for skillfully using the nihonga style, which is a Japanese style of painting that focuses on being different from the Western style of painting or yoga. Following the nihonga paintings of beauties, Kim used this style to illustrate women as fair and elegant, facing away from the viewer and engaging in rearing their children and other daily activities. These paintings have been criticized for bringing out stereotypical expectations of women following Orientalism.

He was also known for his portraiture which displayed his expertise in fine brushwork and intricate patterns. He was a traditional painter who mostly used ink to paint on materials like silk and paper. While many of his paintings revolve around women and children, he also painted many works related to Buddhism and nature.

Kim was an influential painter of the time whose paintings are still showcased and auctioned in Korea as well as the United States of America. However, some of his paintings created during the decades of Japanese colonialism and the conflict in Korea, are seen as insensitive or pro-Japanese works by modern-day art critics.

=== Joseon Art Exhibition ===
After graduating from the Tokyo School of Fine Arts, Kim returned to Korea and began his career as a professional painter. He submitted many of his works to the Joseon Art Exhibition, where he was featured consecutively for many years. The Joseon Art Exhibition was established by the Japanese government in 1922 during the Japanese annexation of Korea. This exhibition was a way by which the Japanese government controlled the art scene of Korea, promoting certain subject matter and categories as better than others. The exhibition consisted of three sub-sections, one being the 'Oriental' style (tongyanghwa), a section which was the officially accepted Eastern paintings that were painted using the Japanese nanga and nihonga styles. Another was the Western-style paintings and sculpture section, which included paintings in the style of Japanese Academism, and finally, the calligraphy section was later restructured as a craft.

Artists whose work was accepted and featured at the Joseon Art Exhibition were then established as professional artists in Korea. Therefore, this was the pathway used by Kim to establish himself as a known artist in Korea.

=== Students ===
Being one of the first nihonga style painters with a foreign education from Japan, Kim returned to Korea and established himself as a well-known artist and teacher. Kim Ki-chang (1913-2001), who went by the art name Unbo, was one of the students of Kim Eun-ho in the 1930s. He learned calligraphy, ink painting, and specifically the nihonga style from Kim and went on to win many prizes at the Joseon Art Exhibition.

=== Awards and recognition ===
As an expert in portraiture, Kim was often given the opportunity to paint significant individuals in Korean history. Kim was also one of the three Korean artists who was recognized as a 'participant' at the Joseon Art exhibition. While this indicates that Kim was a prominent artist of the time, some critics and art historians argue that Kim was one who abided by the rules of the Japanese government and thus, was a painter who recreated the Japanese agenda through his paintings.

== Art work ==
=== Early 20th century portraiture ===
==== Portraits of Emperor Sunjong ====
Emperor Sunjong (1874-1926) was the last emperor of Korea, who ruled between 1907 and 1910. He is also the only son of Emperor Gojong. Kim is known to have painted three separate portraits of Emperor Sunjong during different times of his career, in 1912, 1923, and between 1923-28. All of these paintings are said to be done by using the Emperor's photograph as a reference instead of an official audience with the Emperor himself.

==== Portrait of Yi U, a grandson of Emperor Gojong ====
Yi U (1912-1945) was Emperor Gojong's grandson, named the Unhyeon Palace's heir Gojong who was named the heir of the Unhyeon Palace in 1917. Kim painted a portrait of Yi U, again using a photograph as the reference where Yi is dressed in the official court dress and bears a gold crown.

=== Paintings ===
==== Buddhist Dancing by a Beauty, 1922 ====
During this period, painting people, especially women, the elderly, and children became the trend. This painting of two beautiful nuns performing a Buddhist dance is a good example.

==== Gaze, 1923 ====
This painting is a subtle shift from Kim's typical traditional themes as he incorporates slight influences of the 'modern girl' or 'new woman' ideologies. The painting depicts a woman under a tree with traditional themes, however, dressed in a sheer and shorter hanbok, accessorized with a short bob haircut which was the fashion during the time.

==== Spring in the Suburb, 1927 ====
Following Kim's usual themes, this painting shows a mother with her two children, who walk along in joy. This painting is a good example of Senten paintings, portrayals of women involved in giving birth or raising children.

==== Woman Reading the Fortune of the Day, 1927 ====
This painting depicts a woman wearing a hanbok, seated on the ground, and reading the fortune through a collection of tiny tiles arranged in a particular order.

==== An Illustration of Golden Offerings, 1937 ====
This painting portrays gold hairpins being presented to the Japanese Governor General of Korea between 1936 and 1942, Minami Jiro by leaders of the Patriotic Women's Club. The work has been criticised for its strong political implications of being supportive of the Japanese government.

==== Harmony, 1944 ====
In contrast to Korea's difficult times during this era, this painting presents the happy and harmonious family unit that the title suggests. This painting is of two children and their mother; a singing daughter, a son playing the harmonica, and their mother who watches them with contentment. This painting was published at the last Joseon Art Exhibition, held in 1944.

==== Hawk, 1944 ====
In the year just before the division and independence of Korea, the country was going through many conflicts, and themes of war were very prominent among artists as shown in this painting. Here there is a hawk perched on the tip of a rock amidst a rough sea line. Some art historians interpret this scene as a symbol of soldiers in battle planes.

== See also ==
- An Jung-sik
- Kim Ki-chang
