= O Sech'ang =

Korean politician (1864–1953)

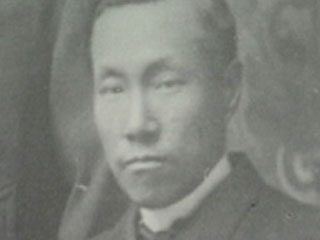
- Born: August 6, 1864
- Died: April 16, 1953 (aged 88)

Korean name
- Hangul: 오세창
- Hanja: 吳世昌
- RR: O Sechang
- MR: O Sech'ang

Art name
- Hangul: 위창
- Hanja: 葦滄; 韙傖
- RR: Wichang
- MR: Wich'ang

O Sech'ang (Korean: 오세창; Hanja: 吳世昌, 6 August 1864 – 16 April 1953), art name Wich'ang (위창; 葦滄; 韙傖), was a Korean politician, politician, writer, calligrapher-painter (서화가; 書畫家; seohwaga), and Korean independence activist.

He is known for his writings on Korean calligraphy-paintings and epigraphy, such as Geunyeok seohwi (근역서휘; 槿域書彙) and Geunyeok insu (근역인수; 槿域印藪), Geunyeok seohwajing (근역서화징; 槿域書畵徵), an encyclopaedia of Korean art history, as well as his active engagement in journalism, art, and politics.

== Early life ==
O Sech'ang was born into the chungin class as the eldest son of O Kyŏngsŏk (오경석; 吳慶錫, 1831–1879), interpreter (역관; 譯官) of Chinese and collector of calligraphy and paintings. He came from a wealthy family with eight generations of translator-interpreters, and benefited from access to the family's collection of rare books, paintings, and metal and stone rubbings, as well as a progressive atmosphere in gaining new knowledge at the end of the nineteenth century, as Joseon began to open its ports and undergo socio-political movements of modernisation and reformation. Influenced by his father's receptiveness to modernity, he was involved in many different areas of reformation during the late Joseon and Korean Empire period.

== Early career in government ==
At the age of 16, O Sech'ang passed the civil service examination in Chinese (한학; 漢學) translation and interpretation (역과; 譯科). After beginning a government career at the Office of Culture and Information (박문국; 博文局), he gradually took on higher roles in government including the Ministry of Defence (국군기무처; 國軍機務處), Department of Agriculture, Commerce, and Industry (농상공부; 農商工部), and the Postal Office (우정국; 郵征局).

Due to his close association with members of the Reform Party such as Kim Okkyun, Pak Yŏnghyo, and Yu Kilchun, he was arrested for the involvement in the 1884 Kapsin Coup, but was released without charges. In 1895, he briefly fled to Japan for suspected involvement in the assassination of Empress Myeongseong. In 1897, he taught the Korean language for a year at the Tokyo College of Commerce (東京商業學校) at the invitation of the Japanese Ministry of Education. After briefly returning to Korea and participating in the Independence Club, he fled to Japan once more in 1902 for his involvement in Yu Kilchun's Ilsimhoe (일심회; 一心會), a pro-revolution group composed of military officer students that studied in Japan.

O Sech'ang returned to Korea once again in 1906, after which he worked outside the government.

After annexation, he became a leading figure in the independence movement and was incarcerated for 3 years for his role as one of the 33 leaders of the March First Movement in 1919.

== Career in media ==
Although O Sech'ang started his professional career as a translator-interpreter, in 1880, he started to work at the Office of Culture and Information and was involved with the publishing of a weekly government gazette, Hansŏng jubo, from 1886. After returning to Korea from Japan in 1906, he worked as president of newspapers Mansebo and Taehan minbo. His career in media was cut short when Japanese authorities imposed aggressive censorship of Korean press and gradually abolished most Korean newspapers from the signing of the 1905 Eulsa Treaty, the Publication Law (신문지법; 新聞紙法) in 1907, and annexation in 1910.

== Career in arts ==
=== Colonial period ===
Besides his career in government and media, O Sech'ang was also a prominent leader in the creative arts. As an avid collector of paintings and calligraphy, as well as a talented painter-calligrapher himself, he co-founded the first modern artists' association, Seohwa Hyeophoe (서화협회, 書畵協會, Calligraphy and Painting Association) with celebrated artists such as An Chungsik (1861–1919), Cho Sŏkjin, and Kim Kyujin in 1918. Seohwa Hyeophoe played a major role in the fostering of Korean artists and modern exhibition culture in the early twentieth century, and hosted an annual exhibition, Seohwa hyeophoejeon (서화협회전, also known as Hyeopjeon, 협전) from 1921 to 1936. Hyeopjeon was the only competing exhibition to the prestigious annual Chōsen Art Exhibition (also called "Seonjeon") hosted by the Japanese Government-General from 1922 to 1944, but was eventually overshadowed by Seonjeon. Like many members of Seohwa hyeophoe, O Sech'ang himself submitted calligraphy in seal-script in the first Seonjeon in 1922 and was awarded the 2nd place prize, but from 1923, he refused to participate in Seonjeon and submitted works in Hyeopjeon instead.

During most of the colonial period, he withdrew from political activities, and worked on his publications and other artistic endeavours. In his lifetime, he completed several important literatures on Korean paintings and calligraphy.

Important examples of his works include Geunyeok seohwi (근역서휘, 槿域書彙, 1911), a collection of calligraphy by Goryeo and Joseon literati scholars, and Geunyeok hwahwi (근역화휘; 槿域畵彙), a catalogue of 67 paintings, organised by subject matters. O Sech'ang also compiled a catalogue of 3,912 seals used by Joseon scholars and painter-calligraphers, titled Geunyeok insu (근역인수; 槿域印藪).

O Sech'ang's most notable contribution to the development of modern Korean art history was the compilation of 3 volumes of Geunyeok seohwasa (근역서화사; 槿域書畵史) in 1917 and its mass print of the publication by the Enlightenment Club (계명구락부; 啓明俱樂部) led by Ch'oe Namsŏn as Geunyeok seohwajing (근역서화징; 槿域書畵徵) in 1928. The book chronologically addressed the comprehensive history of Korean art from the Silla period to the colonial period and listed and recorded the activities and works of 1,117 painters and calligraphers. It is widely recognised as the first encyclopaedia of Korean art written by a Korean scholar, which shaped the foundations of the field of Korean art history in the post-war period.

== Post-liberation ==
For his contribution to the establishment of the South Korean government after liberation in 1945 and the Korean War, O Sech'ang was posthumously awarded the Presidential Medal in the Order of Merit for National Foundation in 1962.
