= Kim Ki-chang =

South Korean artist (1913–2001)

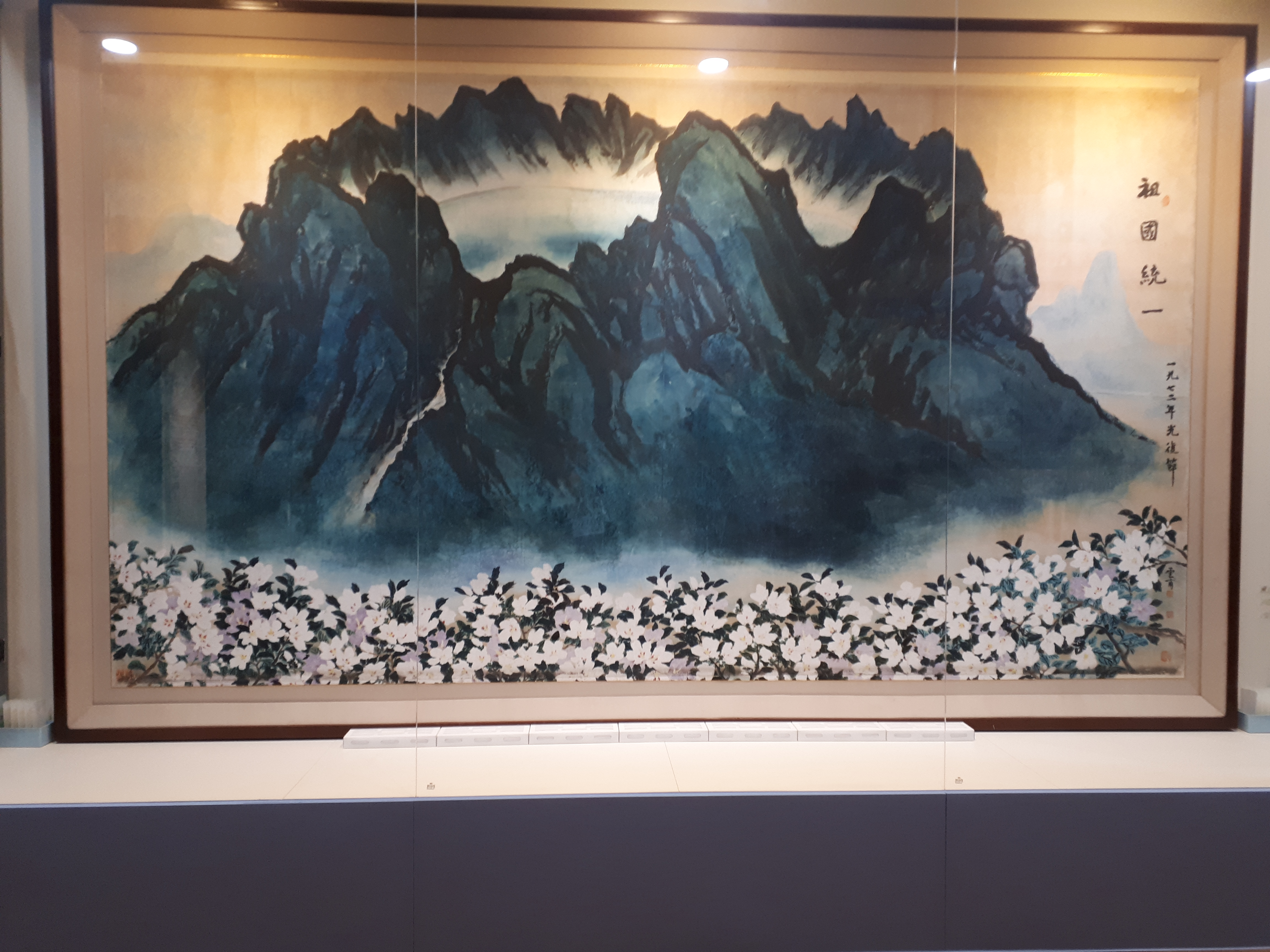
Landscape of Mt.Baekdu, Painted by Kim Ki-chang

Kim Ki-chang (Korean: 김기창; Hanja: 金基昶, 18 February 1913 – 23 January 2001), art name Unbo (운보; 雲甫), was a Korean artist.

Active from the colonial period, Kim learned painting and calligraphy from artist Kim Eun-ho (김은호, 金殷鎬, 1892–1979) and consecutively won prizes in the category of Eastern Painting (Dongyanghwa, 동양화, 東洋畫) in the prestigious annual Chōsen Art Exhibition, which was hosted by the Japanese Government-General from 1931 to 1940. He was famous for his traditional coloured paintings (chaesaekhwa, 채색화, 彩色畫) influenced by Japanese ink and colour painting styles, and his figure paintings were known for their delicate renderings. During the colonial period, Kim Ki-chang produced a number of paintings that praised and supported Japanese imperialism, militarism, and the forced mobilisation of the Korean people for the Asia-Pacific War, and was later named in the Collaborator Dictionary (친일인명사전, 親日人名辭典) in 2009. Despite controversies over his collaborative activities, he continued to actively produce works as a renowned artist until his death in 2001.

After liberation and his marriage to artist Park Rehyun (박래현, 朴崍賢,1920–1976) in 1946, Kim Ki-chang began to produce lighter, semi-abstract coloured ink paintings (sumuk damchaehwa, 수묵담채화, 水墨淡彩畫). He began teaching at Hongik University from 1955, became professor at Sudo Women Teachers' College (Sejong University) in 1962, and also participated in the 1967 São Paulo Art Biennial.

The series of 'Babo sansu' (바보산수, Silly Landscape) and 'Cheongrok sansu' (청록산수, Blue and Green Landscape) of the 1970s to the 90s are credited as Kim Ki-chang's most distinctive and popular works, expressive of freedom and naivete. In the 1970s, he also produced several standard portraits (pyojun yeongjeong, 표준영정, 標準影幀) of historical figures such as King Sejong the Great, Kim Jeong-ho, and Ŭlchi Mundŏk.

== Early life and education ==
Kim Ki-chang was born in 1913 in Keijō, Keiki-dō, Korea, Empire of Japan. At the age of seven, he suffered from typhoid fever and lost his hearing. Despite his disability and his father's wish to raise Kim Ki-chang as a carpenter, his mother strongly supported his art education. With her assistance, Kim Ki-chang became a student of Kim Eun-ho, who was a highly celebrated artist who had previously painted the royal portrait of Emperor Gojong and Sunjong. Under Kim Eun-ho's apprenticeship, Kim Ki-chang was taught traditional ink and colour painting. Much like his teacher, his painting style was influenced by contemporary Japanese ink and colour painting, with a focus on figure painting (inmunhwa, 인물화, 人物畵) that most often realistically rendered women and children in a soft hue.

== Recognition in the colonial period ==
Kim Ki-chang first entered the Chōsen Art Exhibition in 1931 and won a prize in the category of Eastern Painting with Pansang domu (판상도무, 板上跳舞, Jumping on a Seesaw, 1931). He consecutively won prizes until 1937 when he won his first Special Prize (특선; 特選) with Godam (고담, 古談, Old Tale, 1937). After winning four Special Awards in a row, he became one of the Recommended Artists (추천작가; 推薦作家), which guaranteed and attested for the artist's influence in the contemporary art scene. Like many contemporary artists of the 1930s, Kim Ki-chang also used Local Colour (hynagtosaek, 향토색, 鄕土色) of idyllic scenes that generally appealed to colonial Japanese authorities who were in control of the art scene. He held his first solo exhibition in 1942 after becoming a Recommended Artist. Unfortunately, many of his earlier works are yet to be located or lost during the Korean War.

== Marriage and artistic collaboration ==
Kim Ki-chang's marriage to fellow artist Park Rehyun in 1946 was a pivotal point in his career. After his marriage, he frequently held joint exhibitions with Park, and discarded previous styles of realistic coloured figure painting to produce ink and colour painting that used more water and lighter, transparent shades. His brushstrokes became quicker and the rendition of forms in his paintings were simplified to the point where they became semi-abstract. The couple held 17 joint exhibitions and worked closely together until 1970 when Park Rehyun left for the United States to study printmaking. Kim Ki-chang had a brief hiatus after Park's death in 1976, soon after her return to Korea.

== 1970s to 1990s ==
Kim Ki-chang's 'Babo sansu' series was an attempt to modernise traditional Korean minhwa (민화, 民畵, genre painting). As can be inferred from "babo" the Korean term for "fool," it was an intuitive and humorous take on landscape that appeared as if a fool or a child had painted it. The style used simple, cartoon-like forms that emphasised pure and sincere expressions of aesthetics and emotions. By this point, his works incorporated highly abstract forms that transcend time and space. The dynamic movement that gives life to these landscape paintings is commonly interpreted as Kim Ki-chang's way of expressing sound through brushstrokes in his "world of silence" caused by his hearing disability.

== Later years and legacy ==
In his late years, Kim Ki-chang produced works of 'Cheongrok sansu' series and munjado (문자도, 文字圖, letter paintings) and continued to use traditional minhwa references such as sipjangsaeng (십장생, 十長生, Ten Symbols of Longevity) and jangseung (장승, Korean totem poles). He was also a passionate advocator for the awareness and welfare of the deaf community in South Korea.

Kim Ki-chang is regarded as a pioneer in the modernisation of traditional Korean ink and colour painting, and the expansive years of his artistic activities provide insight to the history of Korean modern and contemporary art. He is credited for the bold reinterpretation of traditional folk painting and landscape painting, as well as contributing to the rediscovery of Korean identity in art after liberation. The stylistic changes in Kim Ki-chang's works reflect such process of exploration of an autonomous Korean identity. He was presented with the Samil Prize in 1971 and the Inchon Award in 1991.
