= Mansebo =

1906–1907 newspaper in Korea

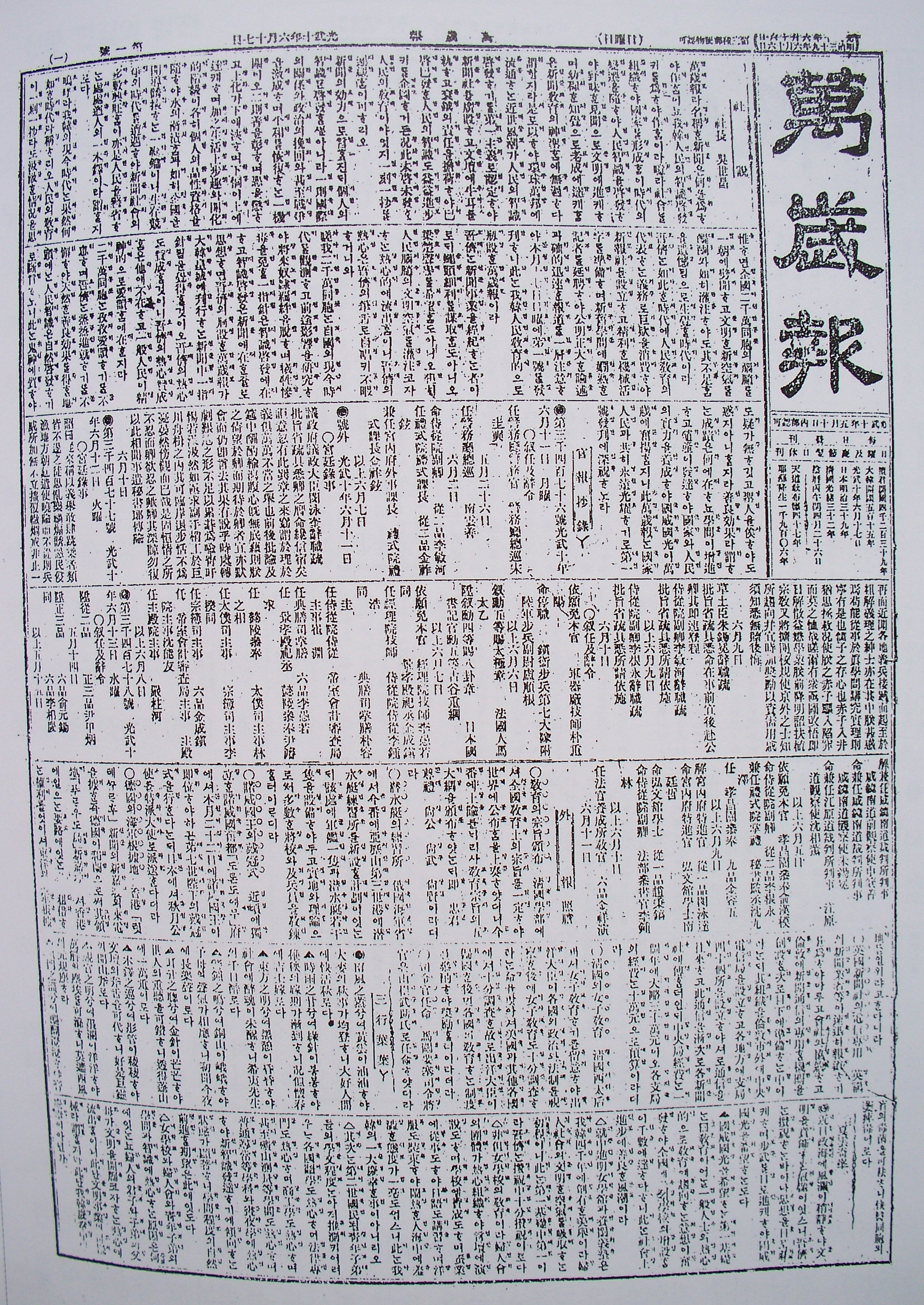
- Cover of the first edition (1906)
- Founder: Son Byong-hi
- Founded: 1906
- Ceased publication: June 29, 1907
- Language: Korean (mixed script)

Mansebo (Korean: 만세보; Hanja: 萬歲報) was a daily Korean-language newspaper published in Seoul, Korean Empire between 1906 and 1907.

It was founded by Son Byong-hi, leader of the religious movement Cheondoism. It was headquartered in what is today Hoehyeon-dong. The president was O Se-chang, publisher and editor Sin Kwang-hŭi, and head writer Yi In-jik. Each issue had four pages. The paper, unusually for the time, had seven rows for writing, when most had eight. Initially, the paper showed the pronunciation of various Hanja characters in Hangul, but stopped this practice beginning on March 9, 1907.

The newspaper's stated intent was to educate the people. It promoted the Korean independence movement and attacked pro-Japanese Koreans, like those of the group Iljinhoe. From July 22 to October 10, 1906, it published Yi's novel (혈의 누; 血의 淚) serially across 50 issues. According to the Encyclopedia of Korean Culture, this was the first serial publication of a novel for a Korean newspaper.

The Korean Emperor Gojong was reportedly fond of the paper, and donated 1,000 won from his own private funds for its continued operation. Despite this and financial support from the Chendoism movement, the paper struggled financially. The paper initially charged 1 jeon per issue, and 20 jeon for a month. However, by November 1906, it increased its prices as it raised the number of pages per issue to eight.

The final issue to be published was the June 29, 1907 No. 293 issue. On the 30th, they released a statement attributing the stopping of publication to broken printing equipment. Afterwards, the newspaper was purchased by former head writer Yi In-jik using funds from pro-Japanese minister Lee Wan-yong, and became an organ of Iljinhoe. It changed its name to Taehan Sinmun.
