= Taehan sinmun =

1907–1910 newspaper in Korea

Taehan Sinmun
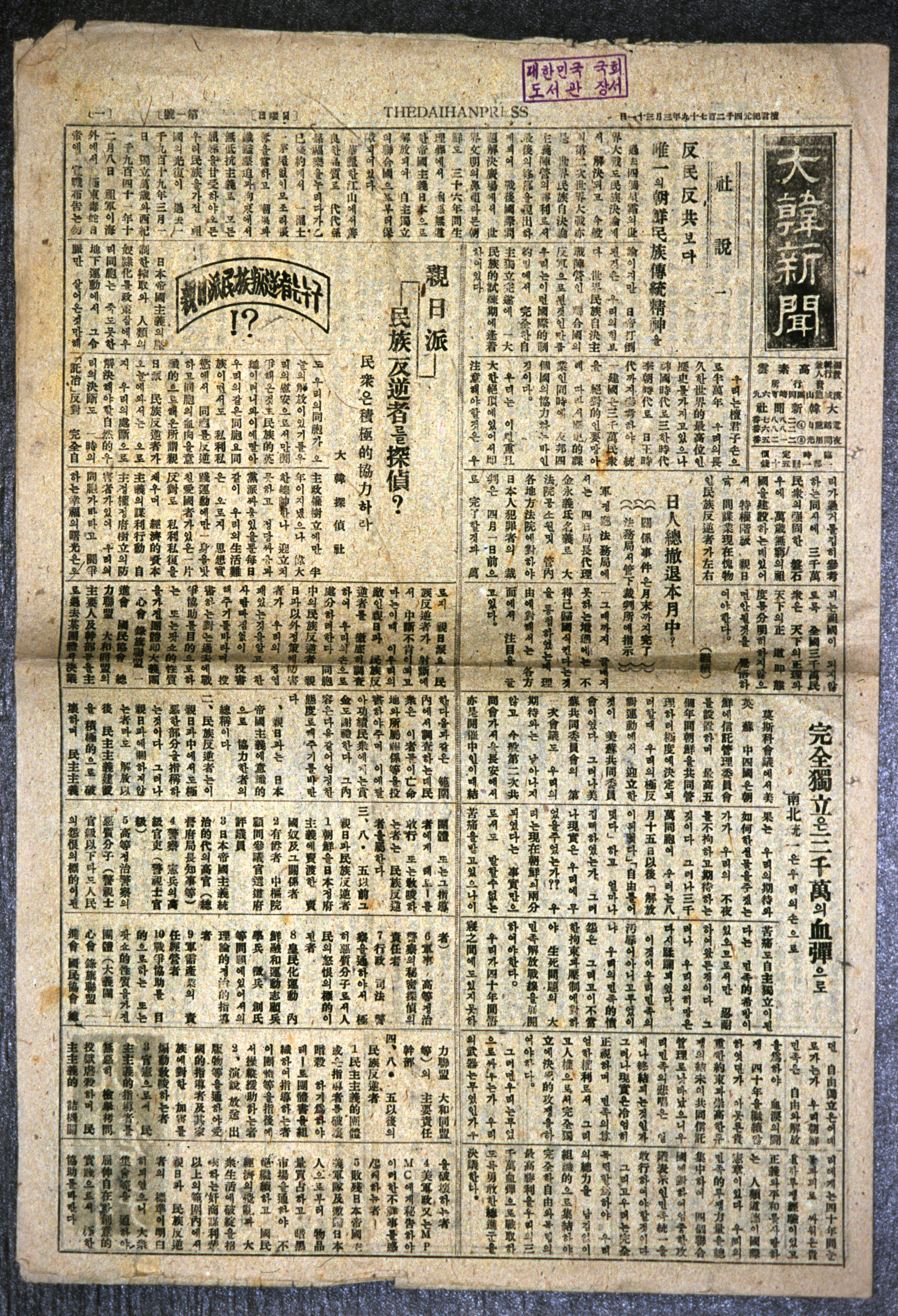
- Cover of one of the editions
- Founder(s): Lee Wan-yong, Yi In-jik
- Editor: Sin Kwang-hŭi
- Founded: 1907
- Ceased publication: September 1, 1910
- Political alignment: Pro–Empire of Japan
- Language: Korean (mixed script)
- City: Seoul
- Country: Korean Empire

Taehan Sinmun (Korean: 대한신문; Hanja: 大韓新聞; RR: Daehan Sinmun; lit. 'Great Korean Newspaper'), or The Daihan Press, was a Korean-language newspaper published in the Korean Empire from 1907 to 1910.

The paper was the successor to the previous 1906–1907 newspaper Mansebo. Mansebo was a newspaper affiliated with the Cheondoism religious movement. It and Chendoism were critical of Japan's encroachments into Korean sovereignty; reportedly even the Korean Emperor Gojong was fond of the paper. However, it eventually shut down on June 29, 1907, due to financial difficulties.

Prominent pro-Japanese Korean minister Lee Wan-yong wanted to establish a paper that supporting his leanings, and arranged for the former head writer of Mansebo, Yi In-jik, to purchase the former paper and its facilities. It was then converted into the pro-Japanese Taehan Sinmun.

The paper was headquartered in what is today Hoehyeon-dong, Seoul. It had a budget of 20,000 won. Its president was Yi In-jik, editor Sin Kwang-hŭi, and head writer Ch'oe Yŏng-su (최영수; 崔永秀). It promoted the agendas of Lee and his organization Iljinhoe. According to a Daehan Maeil Sinbo report, the newspaper received around 500 won per month from the government's Ministry of Finance, and even received a 1,000 won donation from Lee in November 1909 to support the acquisition of movable type printing presses.

The paper was firmly pro-Japanese until its end. After the assassination of former Japanese Resident-General of Korea Itō Hirobumi by Korean independence activist An Jung-geun, the paper joined other pro-Japanese papers such as Kungmin Sinbo in a memorial ceremony to Itō.

Shortly after Korea's formal annexation into the Empire of Japan in 1910, the newspaper had to change its name. It briefly changed to Hanyang Sinmun (한양신문; 漢陽新聞), but was discontinued and merged into other pro-Japanese Korean newspaper Maeil Sinbo on September 1, 1910.

== See also ==
- List of newspapers in Korea – list of pre-1945 newspapers, including Japanese
- History of newspapers in Korea – prose history of newspapers in Korea
