= An Chungsik =

Korean artist (1861–1919)

- Photograph of An Chungsik published on 4 November 1919
- Born: 28 August 1861; Seoul, Korea
- Died: 2 November 1919 (aged 58)
- Occupation: Artist

Korean name
- Hangul: 안중식
- Hanja: 安中植
- RR: An Jungsik
- MR: An Chungsik

Art name
- Hangul: 심전
- RR: Simjeon
- MR: Simjŏn

An Chungsik (Korean: 안중식; Hanja: 安中植, 1861–1919), art name Simjŏn (심전), was an artist who lived at the very end of the Joseon period.

An is known for being one of the last painters under the Royal Bureau of Painting, the official painting organization for the Korean monarchy. After the Japanese Annexation of Korea, An became a teacher for multiple painting and calligraphy schools and institutions, inspiring and leading the next generation of Korean painters. He also created his own association called the Association of Painters and Calligraphers, where exhibitions for Korean artists to showcase their work would be hosted. An worked here until his death in 1919, which signified the end of traditional Joseon court painting technique and style.

== Biography ==
=== Early life ===
==== The Royal Bureau of Painting ====
Attributed by Chang Sŭngŏp. Birds and Flowers (undated). Writing by An Jungsik

An Jungsik studied painting under Chang Sŭngŏp, a 19th-century artist known for his ink painting capabilities and overall well-roundedness in an array of painting styles. Chang is often described as being one of the three greatest artists during the Joseon period, along with Kim Hongdo and Sin Yunbok. An and Chang had a close relationship - An often did the writing, such as inscriptions and signatures, for Chang, who was illiterate. After practicing and learning under Chang, An joined the Royal Bureau of Painting. It was during his time as a profession court painter when he became well acquainted with Cho Sŏkchin, 1853–1920), another painter who was also working for the Royal Joseon court. Both of these artists held the title of “painter-in-charge of royal portraiture” (jugwan hwasa), the highest honor and title court painters could receive.

In 1881, An and Cho were chosen to accompany 38 young officials (yeongseonsa) on a diplomatic trip to Tianjin, China, where the two learned how to draw mechanical blueprints from the Chinese Bureau of Machinery. Within this year-long mission, An and Jo, who were 21 and 29 at the time, picked up on Western technology and industrial painting styles. An continued to learn new painting methods when he visited Shanghai after the Tianjin diplomatic trip. Upon his return to Korea in 1892, he was designated the role of prefect of Jipyeong, then was promoted to governor of Ansan in 1894. In 1899, he returned to Shanghai and continued his study before there he moved to Gifu, Japan, for two years until his exile.

==== Political beliefs ====
An was quite vocal regarding his political stances and beliefs. He proudly labeled himself as an active follower of the Progressive Party. In 1884, the political party launched the Gapsin Coup d’etat that ended in failure, leading to An fleeing to Japan. An depicts a meeting of the Progressive Party hosted in the house of fellow painter O Se-chang (오세창, 1864–1953) in a painting labeled Doso Wine Society at Pagoda Garden. Doso is a type of wine consumed for medicinal purposes of casting away evil spirits.

== Career ==
=== Gyeongmukdang ===
During the 1890s and 1900s, there was an influx of Japanese artists establishing schools in Korea to teach the Japanese painting style nihonga ("Japanese-style paintings"). An was inspired by their technique, thus leading him to open up his own private atelier and teach young, prospering Korean painters. An's private studio was called Gyeongmukdang (경묵당, also referred to as Gyeongmukheon 경묵헌; Gyeongmuk 耕墨 means “cultivating the ink”). He established this studio in 1901 after he returned from his exile in Japan. Gyeongmukdang was established in his sarangbang (which translates to ‘love room’) but is defined as “the study and social area in a Korean traditional house where male scholars worked and received guests”. An's private studio has been credited by art historians as being one of the most influential places to get an education on modern ink-wash painting. Besides an educational site, Gyeongmukdang was a social space where important figures would gather and appreciate the ‘traditional three arts’: poetry, calligraphy and painting. The Kyŏngsong School of Calligraphy and Painting (Gyeongseong-seohwa-misulwon 경성서화미술원 京城書畵美術院), one of the main paintings schools in Korea during the 1900s, took on Gyeongmukdang as an apprenticeship. Although Gyeongmukdang opened in 1901, An could not have begun teaching full-time until at least 1907 because of the political positions he held from 1902 to 1907.

=== Political positions ===
Upon his return from Japan following his exile, An received a number of promotions. From 1902 to 1907, he became the primary portraitist of the royal court. Along with that artistic title, he became the Tongjin County Magistrate, and climbed his way up to the Yangcheon County Magistrate. An continued to perform his duties for the Royal Court until the Japanese Empire invaded Korea in 1910 and dismantled the Korean Royal Academy of Painting in 1911.

=== Life as a teacher ===
Alongside his private studio, An went on to teach at multiple art institutions. In 1911, literati artist Yun Yonggi (1833–?) founded the Kyŏngsong School of Calligraphy and Painting (Gyeong-seong sŏhwa misulwŏn 경성서화미술원 京城書畵美術院) to train the newest up and coming painters in calligraphy and ink painting. The following year, the Art Association of Calligraphy and Painting (Seohwa misulhoe 서화미술회 書畵美術會), which was established to support the Kyŏngsong School of Calligraphy and Painting and overseen by the Office of the Yi Royal Family, opened. With free tuition and a small founding class of 15 students, this smaller institution became the first school of ink painting and calligraphy in Korea. The school was established to bring Korean art back to life during the Japanese annexation of Korea, where Korean art was disregarded and Japanese art took its place. Along with Cho Sŏkchin, An was one of the main teachers of this school. Other teachers include An's and Cho's disciples: Kang Chinhŭi (강진희, 1851–1919), Chŏng Taeyu, 1852–1927), Kim Ŭngwŏn (김응원, 1855–1921), Kang P'ilju) and Yi Toyŏng, 1884–1933). The curriculum focused on traditional techniques taught by artists who made an impact on the art scene during the Chosŏn era. Alongside the traditional teaching on ink and calligraphy, An and Cho also taught students En plein air, or plein-air painting, which is the act of painting outdoors. An was a teacher who prioritized learning from the past more than assisting students in creating their own individual style. He also emphasized the importance of observing and drawing the “natural world”. After the graduation of the class of 1915, the school officially closed in 1919.

==== Students and Pupils ====
From Gyeongmukdang to the Kyŏngsong School of Calligraphy and Painting, An has acted as mentor for many key Korean artists. Lee Doyeong was An's first student, who he taught at Gyeongmukdang. Lee grew to become a well recognized painter and art teacher. At the Kyŏngsong School of Calligraphy and Painting, An taught many recognizable names, such as Ko Huidong (1886–1965), who is credited with being Korea's first oil painter and Yi Hanbok (1897–1940), a skillful nihonga artist and influential teacher during the '30s. Out of all his pupils, An held a place in his heart for Lee Sangboem (1897–1972) and No Suhyŏn (1899–1978). An called Lee and No his favorite mentees and gifted them with pen names taken from his own, Simjŏn. Simsam was gifted to No Suhyŏn and Ch'ŏngjŏn was for Yi Sangbŏm. Other note-worthy students include O Ilyeong (1890–11960), ink painter Kim Eunho (1892–1979), who became influential teachers in nihonga during the 30’, Park Seungmu (1893–1980), Choe Usŏk (1899–1964) and Yi Yongu (1902–1952), who all were important figures in Korean modern art.

=== Association of Painters and Calligraphers ===
After the Art Association of Calligraphy and Painting was formed, the Association of Painters and Calligraphers was created not too long after. This association was an artist organization composed of teachers and alumni from the Art Association of Calligraphy and Painting and the Kyŏngsong School of Calligraphy and Painting. Created in 1918, An, alongside Cho Sŏkchin and Ko Huidong, established the organization to study European, Asian and modern art and develop past and present Korean art styles to resist the impact returning artists from Japan were bringing to the art scene in Korea. Some historians view this association as being an opponent to the Japanese government sponsored establishment Chōsen Art Exhibition, which was run and directed by Japanese judges, specifically professors from the Tokyo School of Fine Arts, for Japanese artists to present their work. In the Association of Painters and Calligraphers, An assumed the role of president, with Ko acting as secretary general. Other staff members include Kim Ŭngwŏn (1855–1921), Kim Kyujin (1868–1933) and O Sechang. For about a decade, this organization was one of the largest and was known for being one of the first art exhibitions established in Korea, hosting a total of 15 exhibitions. Despite the great initial opening in 1921 with the first ever exhibition, the association had a lack of funds and couldn't publish catalogs and support artists, leading to it being closed in 1936. After his death, An was succeeded as president of the association by Cho Sŏkchin.

=== Death ===
An took part in the March 1st Independence Movement against Japanese colonialism in Korea, and was, like many other participants, arrested and tortured. He died soon thereafter, on 2 November 1919.

== Paintings ==
=== Artistic style ===
An's earlier style was mainly centered around nature - birds, flowers, animals, etc. His work was a fusion between traditional Joseon techniques and contemporary Chinese and Japanese styles. As he moved toward landscape paintings, An experimented with making realistic, modern accurate depictions of the view he saw around him. Despite these modern experiments, he continued to make use of traditional ink and light colors on paper and silk. An understood that the traditional ink painting methods of shading and brushwork were a perfect representation of traditional Korean art, where ink created from ink sticks and water for the purpose of calligraphy and painting is a centuries-long tradition. This can be seen in his famous Spring Dawn at Mt Baegak paintings. Poetic devices were also paired alongside to emphasize colonial rebellion. In the 19th century, An started to incorporate more Western techniques like linear perspective and chiaroscuro, the use of strong contrasts between light and dark. Despite the use of Western techniques, many of An's landscape paintings have been honored with bringing “true scenery” (jingyeong) drawing style, which was highly popular during the Joseon dynasty, back to life. Art historians of the present call An's use of this style “an expression of self-awakening and national consciousness and cultural identity developing.”

=== Spring Dawn at Mt. Baegak ===
Among An Chungsik's main works, is the twofold painting: "Spring Dawn at Mt. Baegak" (Baegakchunhyo, 백악춘효), Registered Cultural Heritage No. 485. Drawing several views of the same landscape according to the seasons (chun=spring, ha, chu, dong) is a recurrent theme across the centuries (e.g. the famous Eight views of the Four Seasons by An Gyeon).

But this twofold painting is slightly different. One panel is '여름본' Summer (more yellow tone, with two tigers), the other is '가을본' Fall (more brown tone, with only one tiger). Both can be seen at National Museum of Korea. First of all, this painting is remarquable by the way it mixes composition and strokes from the traditional Joseon heritage with the Western trends, especially the use of perspective (mathematical projective geometry).

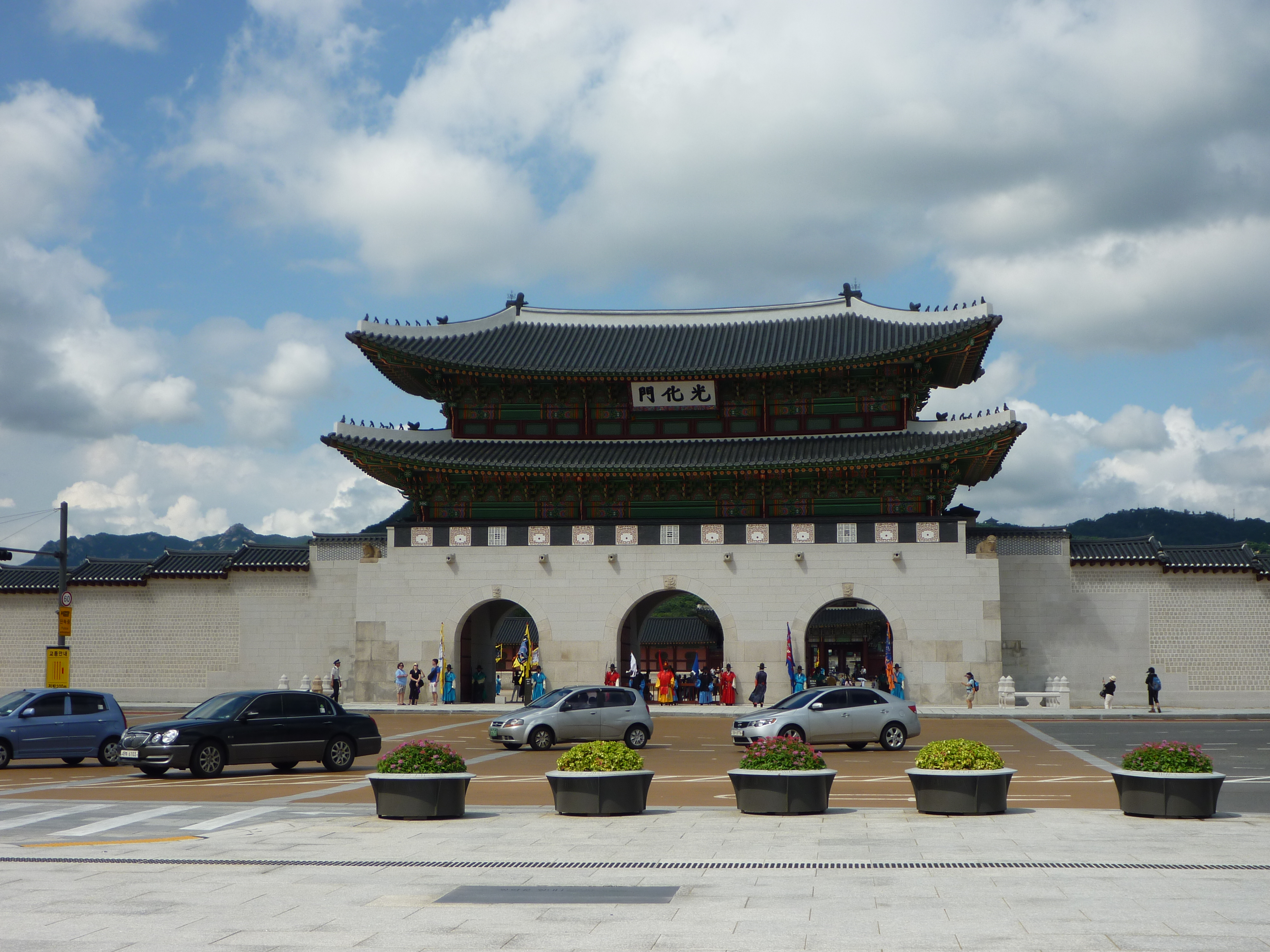
Gwanghwamun rebuild, the main gate of the Gyeongbok Palace

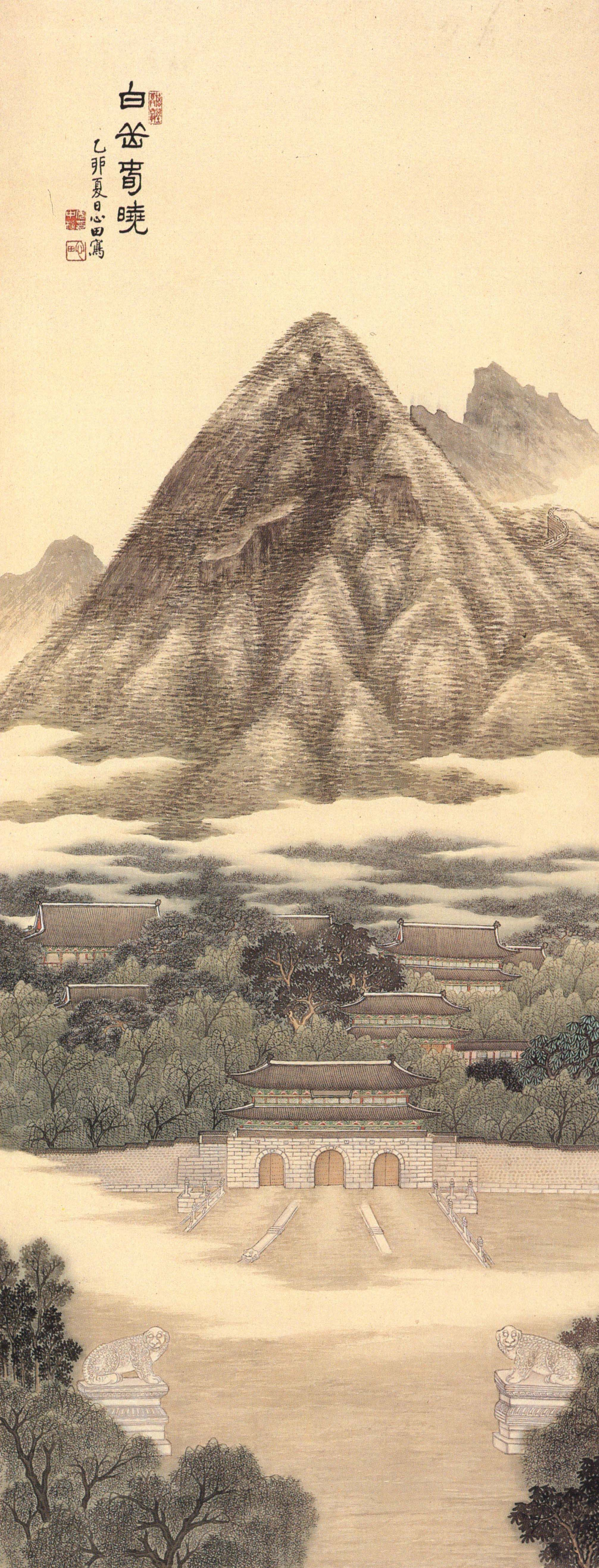
Summer

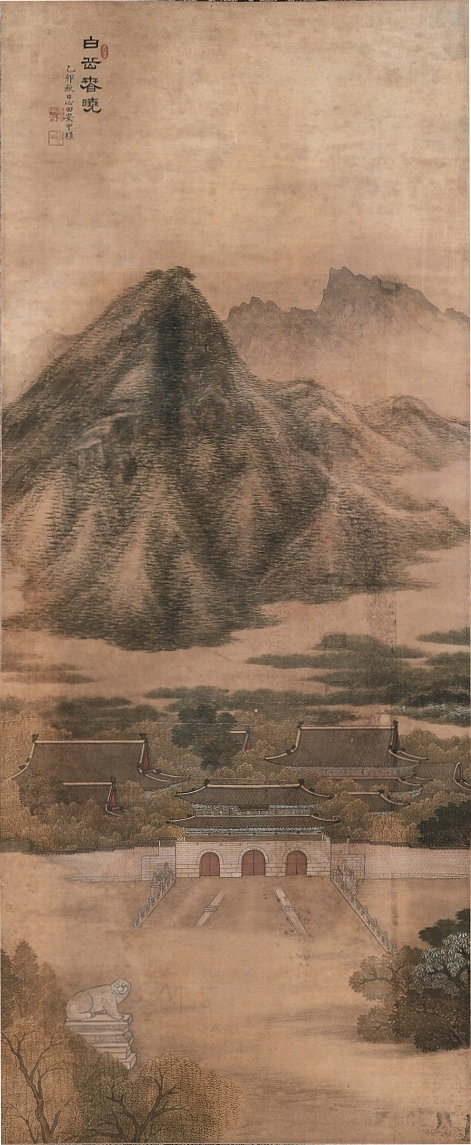
Fall

Baegakchunhyo
Registered Cultural Heritage No. 485.

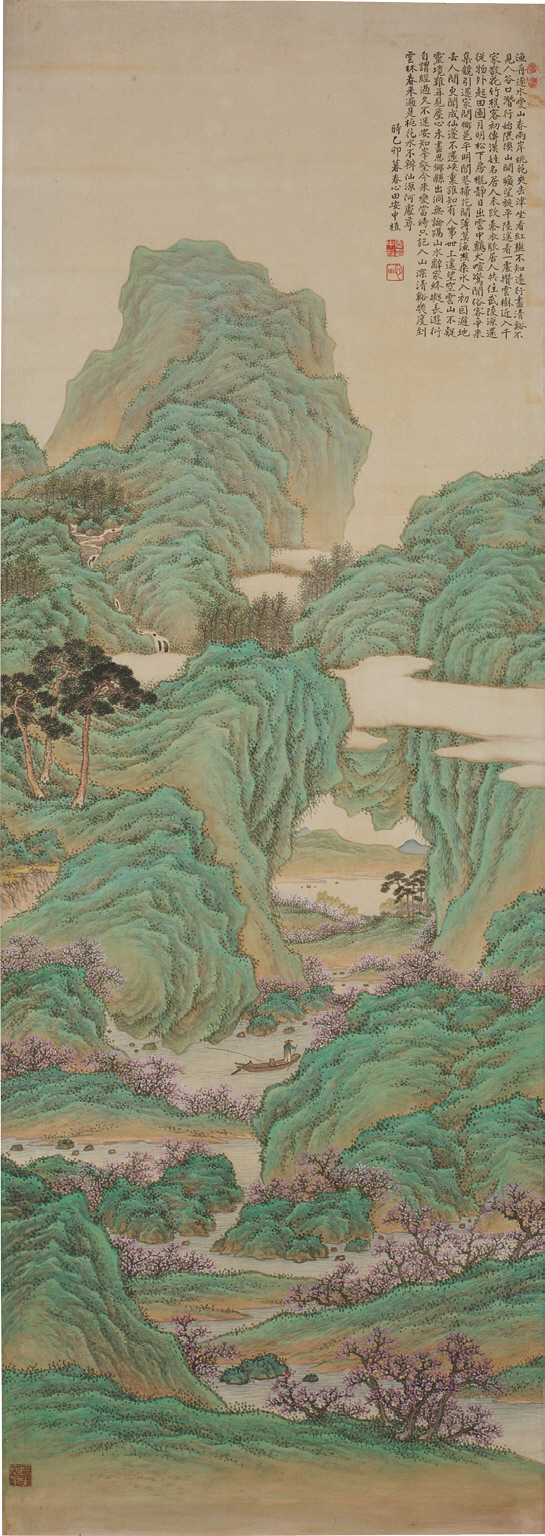
Boat to the Peach Blossom Land, 1915. Ink and colors on silk, 143.5 x 50.7 cm. National Museum of Korea, Seoul

On the upper left corner of the yellow tone painting, one can read the Chinese inscription '白岳春曉' (=백악춘효) meaning 'Dawn of Spring facing Mount Baekak'. Next to it, a little smaller, is written 乙卯 夏日 (=을묘하일, Eul-myo Ha-il) i.e. summer 1915, followed by '心田安中植' (=심전 안중식) i.e. An Chungsik. On the brown tone painting, the second part of inscription is modified into 乙卯 秋日 (=을묘추일, Eul-myo Chu-il) i.e. autumn 1915.

This raise the question: why does the painter wrote down 'Eulmyo in the fall' on the painted work 'Springtime dawn of Baekak'?. An answer can be found in the fact that in 1915, a 'Korea Trade Fair' was held on the premise of the Gyeongbok Palace by the Japanese Government-General. This leads to the demolition of many buildings in the palace complex, preparing the erection (1916–1926) of the massive Japanese General Government Building. In this context, Mount Baekak and even the Gwanghwamun Gate were only a pretext, the true topic being the destruction of the right 'tiger' in the frontview. This 'tiger' was not a simple decorative bloc of stone, but an haetae 해태, i.e. a mythical creature serving as a fengshui guardian against natural disasters and a symbol of law and order. In this case, the two-fold painting was about Summer and Fall of the invaded Korea.

=== Boat to the Peach Blossom Land ===
Painted in the same year as Spring Dawn at Mt. Baegak, An takes a spin on his realistic perception of nature. In this mystical, dreamlike painting, An portrays the Daoist paradise of the Peach Blossom Land, which has been a highly glorified and appreciated East Asian art subject. Dating back to the 7th and 8th centuries, the Peach Blossom Land has been described to be a “mythic heavenly realm” that many people viewed as a utopia and wished to discover, only to realize it can only be obtained in their dreams. His training in traditional court painting can be seen through the fine, netlike lines used to draw the waves.

=== A Cart by Maple Forest ===
This conceptual landscape painting was produced before the switch in how artists approached nature occurred in the late 19th century. During this time, European techniques on naturalism and realism seeped into Korea and challenged the way artists viewed and depicted nature through art. A Cart by Maple Forest shows the traditional method of painting landscapes, creating the theme to feel a bit more mystical and projecting the final work on a scroll.

=== Landscape of Yeonggwang ===
For a month, An visited and stayed at a friend's place in a village located southwest of Yeonggwang. He drew the view and noted his experiences through this ten-fold screen painting. An practices realistic drawing in this artwork by using planar recession, which is when artists create parallel planes that seem to go further into the painting to create the illusion of depth.

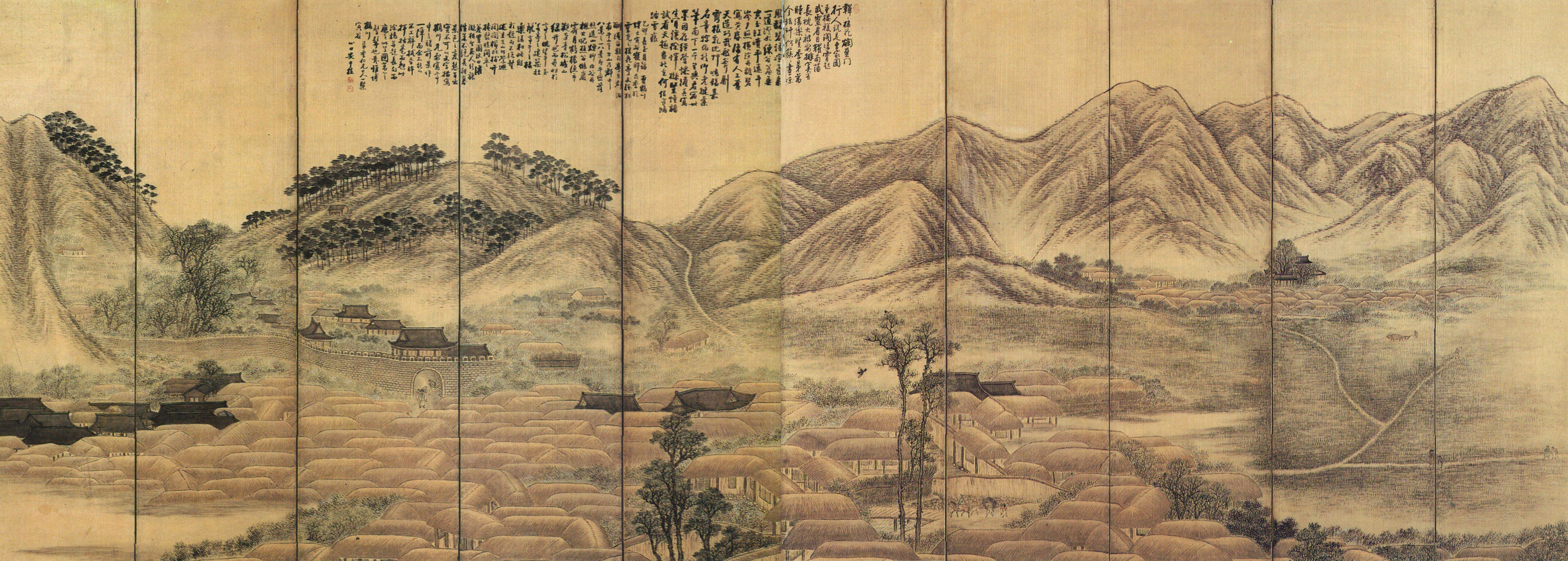
Yeong-gwang Landscape 영광풍경

=== Poetic Collectibles ===
Poetic Collectibles, 1912. Ink and color on silk, 30 x 12cm, Private Collection

Although An is mainly known for his landscape paintings, he also often painted subjects and objects, as can be seen in this painting. Poetic Collectibles indicates the use of a well known popular coloring technique of applying more colorful layers after the previous layer dries. Although it was used during the early Joseon period, An is more likely to have learned it during his time in Japan, where the art technique flourished and became popular.

== Gallery ==
Another notable work is a 10-panel folding screen:

Other well known paintings are:

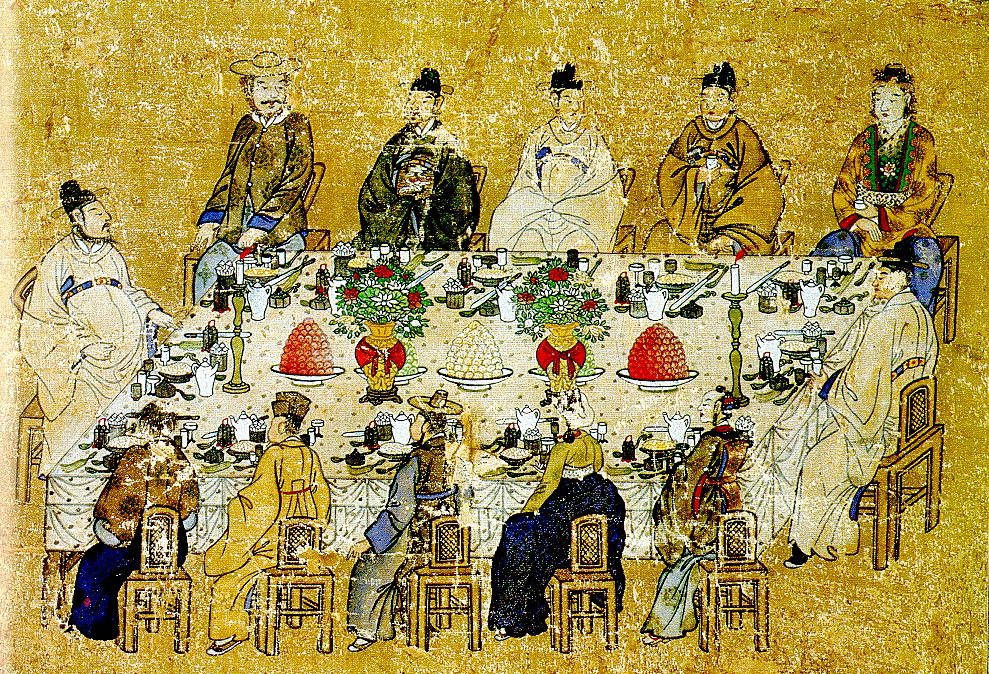
Feast for the 1883 Treaty

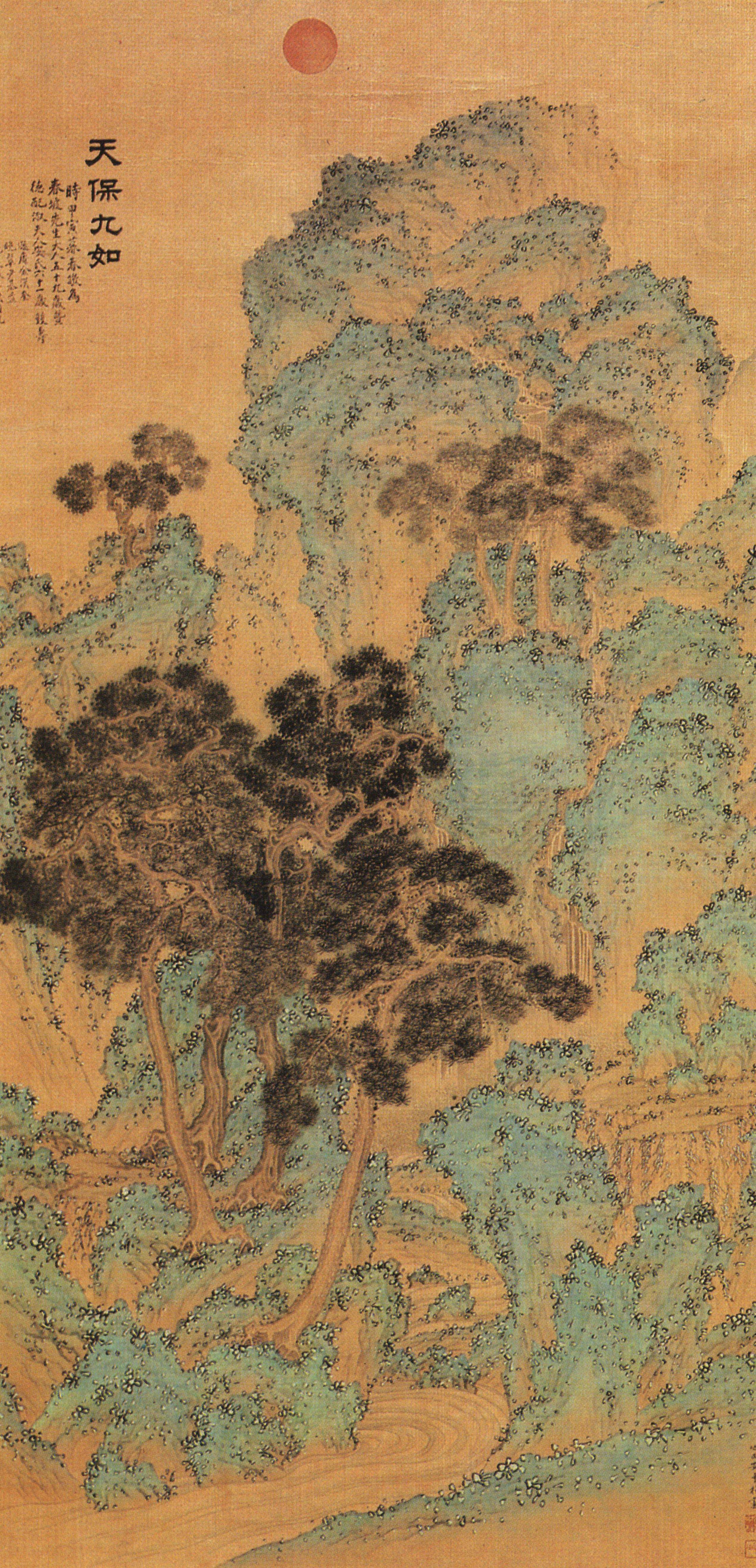
Cheonboguyeo
천보구여

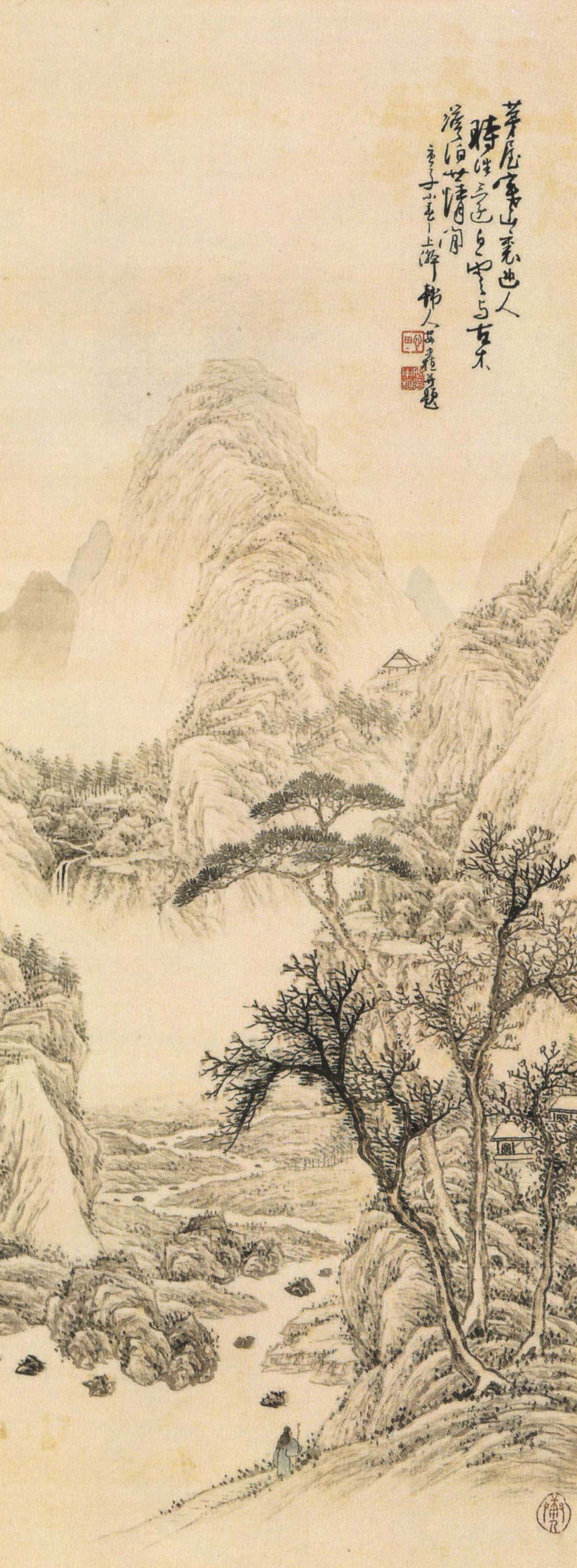
Sansu (1900)
산수

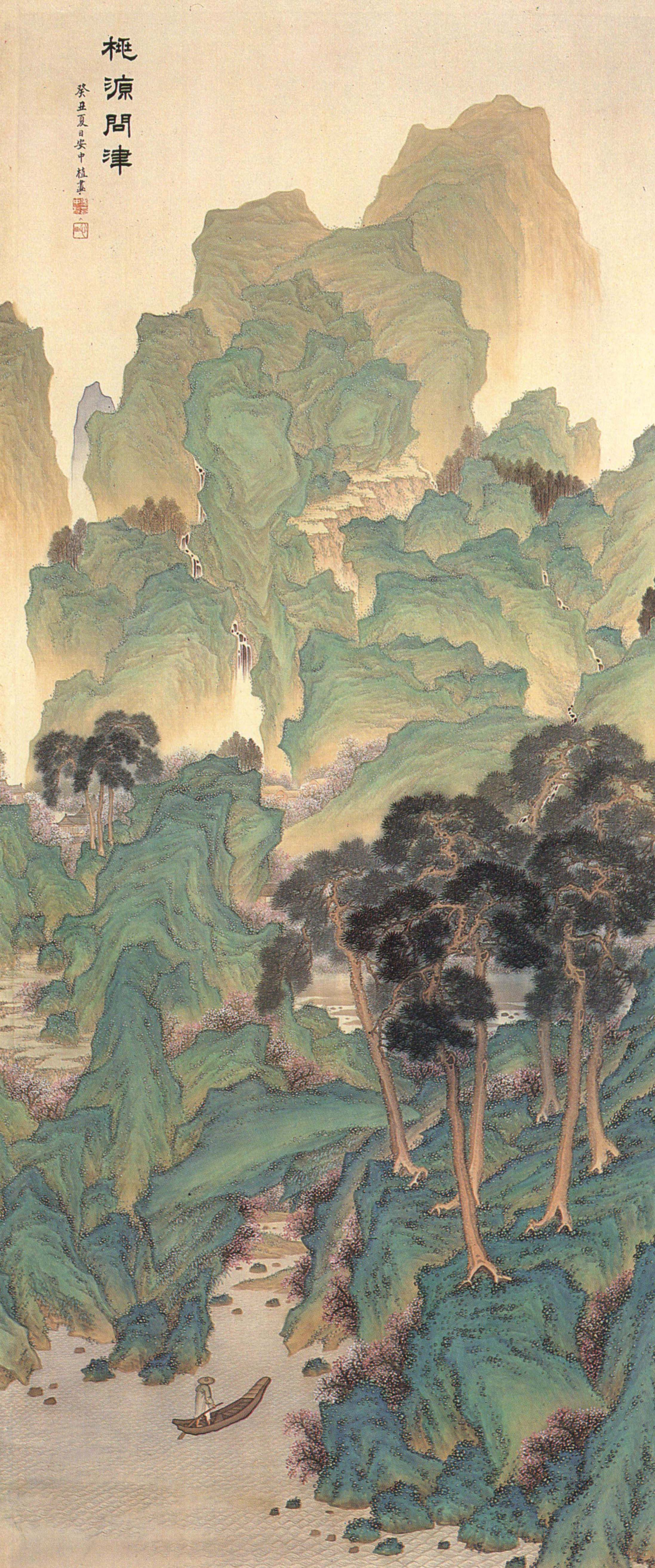
Dowonmunjin
도원문진

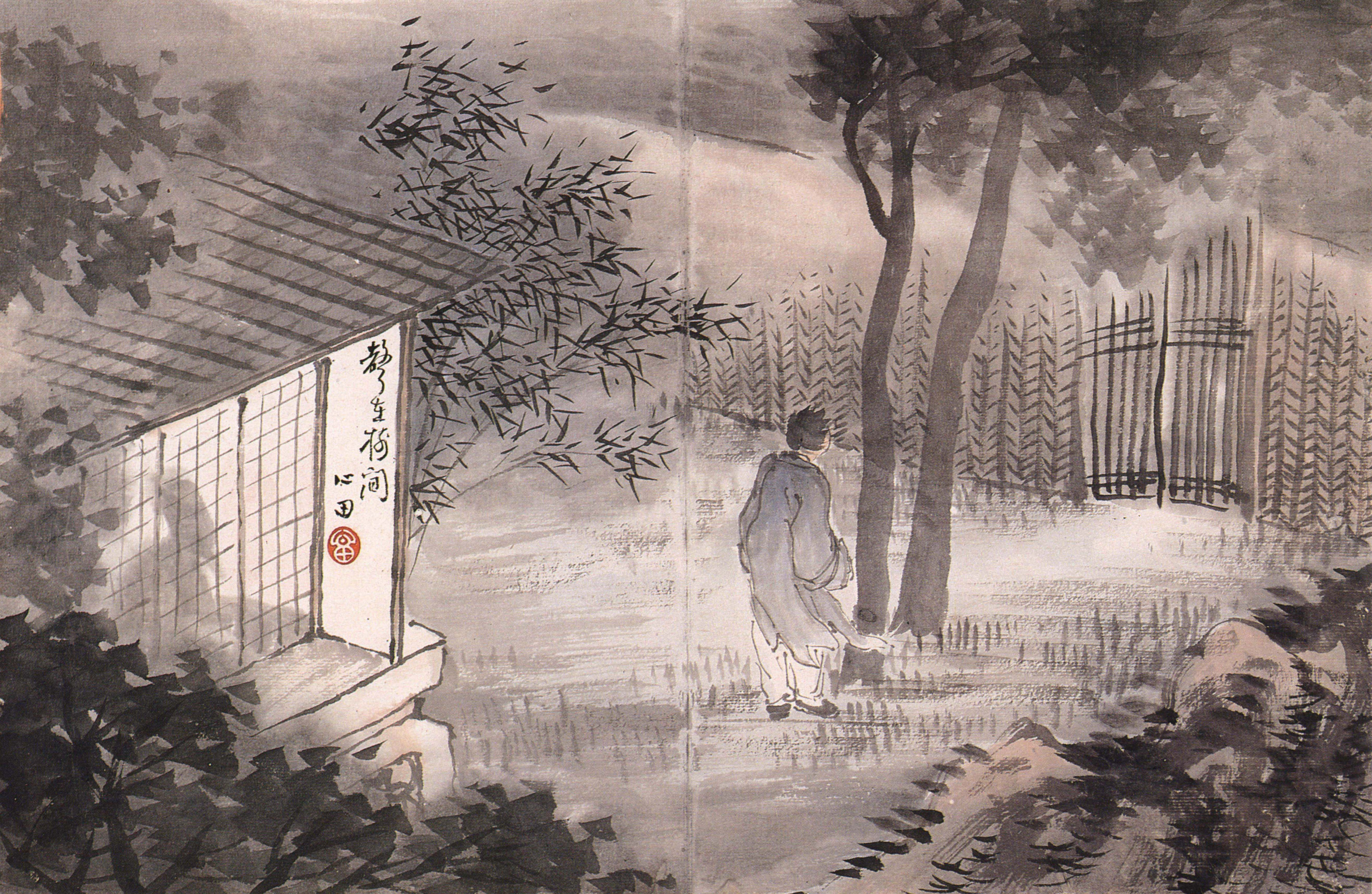
Seongjaesugan (1910)
성재수간

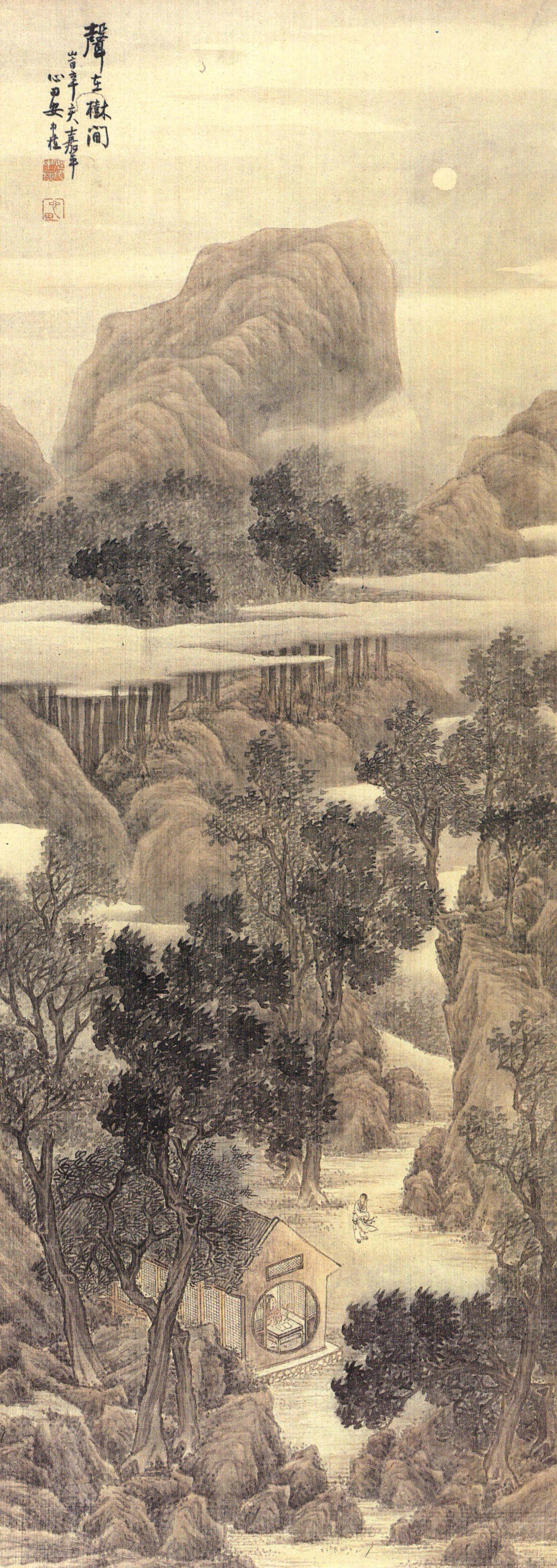
Seongjaesugan (1911)
성재수간

== Legacy ==
An was a successful artist throughout his career. He was favored by the royal court because they viewed him as an example of artists who were able to maneuver the modern movement in their own original style. For instance, despite most of his artwork consisting of traditional Asian styles, such as ink painting, he mentored Go Huidong, who went on to become the first Korean painter to study Western oil painting. An was also known for changing the way in which Japanese and Korean artists interact. An and Cho developed a respectable relationship with Shimizu Toun (1868?–1929?), an underground Japanese artist who created the Korean division of the Joun-sha art society based in Tokyo. Shimizu, An and Cho bonded over their interest in calligraphy and ink painting. This alliance was rare since many Japanese artists residing in Korea did not interact with Korean artists, so this pairing has been marked as an important bridge between Japanese and Korean art scene. Art historians even credit the success of many artists due to their time studying under An. According to Mok Soohyun, “emerging artists who had studied under An became firmly established in the art world [and] served as leaders in contemporary painting.” The passing of An in 1919 also signified the end of an era in Korean art. Many have titled An with being the last role model of traditional court painting and "true Joseon technique".

== Bibliography ==
- Kim, Young-na (2005). 20th Century Korean Art. London: Laurence King Publishing Ltd. ISBN 1-85669-485-2.
- Pratt, Keith L.; Rutt, Richard; Hoare, James E. (1999). Korea, A Historical and Cultural Dictionary. Durham East Asia Series. Routledge. p. 568. ISBN 978-0-7007-0463-7.
- Turner, Jane (2003). Grove Dictionary of Art. Oxford University Press, USA. p. 32600. ISBN 978-0-1951-7068-9.
