= Park Jung-sik (footballer, born 1988) =

South Korean footballer

Park Jung-Sik
Personal information
- Full name: Park Jung-Sik
- Date of birth: 20 January 1988 (age 38)
- Place of birth: South Korea
- Height: 1.73 m (5 ft 8 in)
- Position: Midfielder

Team information
- Current team: FC Anyang
- Number: 14

Youth career
- 2007–2010: Kwangwoon University

Senior career*
Years	Team	Apps	(Gls)
2011–2012	Goyang KB	45	(3)
2013–	FC Anyang	36	(1)
- * Club domestic league appearances and goals as of 24 November 2014

Park Jung-Sik (Korean: 박정식; born 20 January 1988) is a South Korean footballer who plays as midfielder for FC Anyang in K League Challenge.

== Career ==
He was selected by FC Anyang in 2013 K League draft.
