= Go Hui-dong =

Korean painter

- Self-portrait of Go Hui-dong in 1915

Korean name
- Hangul: 고희동
- Hanja: 高羲東
- RR: Go Huidong
- MR: Ko Hŭidong

Go Hui-dong (Korean: 고희동; 1886–1965), also known by the pen name Chun-gok, was a Korean painter. Born in Seoul, he was the first Korean painter to adopt Western styles. He spent most of his life in Seoul. He studied French there from 1899 to 1903 and briefly took a post with the Korean government. Leaving the post in 1905, he studied Korean painting for several years and then traveled to Japan, where he studied Western-style painting under Kuroda Seiki from 1909 to 1915. He returned to Korea in 1915 and sought to fuse traditional and Korean styles. Currently his house located in Bukchon Village is open to public.

== Gallery ==
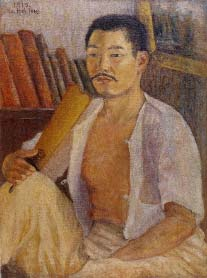
Self-portrait with hand fan, 1915, MMCA
