= Maeil sinbo =

1910–1945 newspaper in Korea

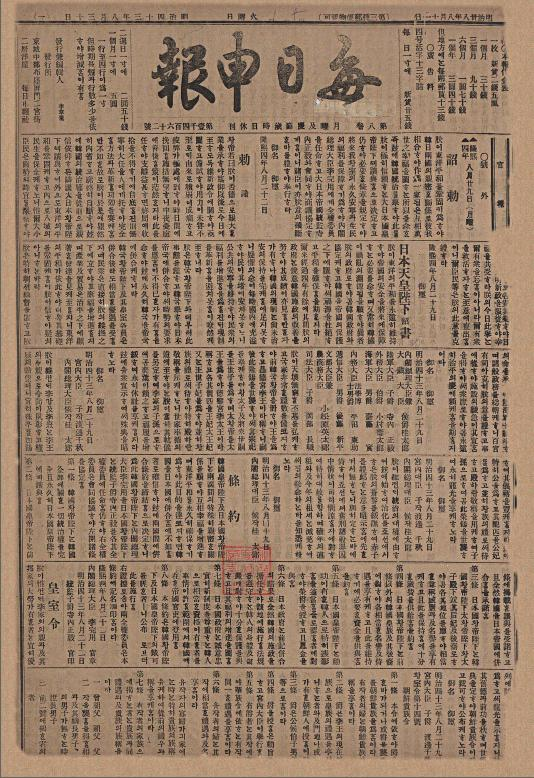
- First page of the inaugural edition of the Maeil sinbo (August 30, 1910)
- Type: Daily newspaper
- Format: Broadsheet
- Founded: August 30, 1910
- Ceased publication: November 10, 1945
- Political alignment: Pro-Empire of Japan
- Language: Korean
- Headquarters: Keijō, Korea, Empire of Japan

The Maeil sinbo (Korean: 매일신보; Hanja: 每日申報; changed to 每日新報 in 1938) was a Korean-language newspaper that was published from 1910 to 1945 from Keijō (Seoul), Korea, Empire of Japan. The newspaper was the successor to The Korea Daily News, which was first published in 1904. It continued publication, largely as an organ of the Japanese colonial government, until the liberation of Korea in 1945. Afterwards, it was taken over by the United States Army Military Government in Korea and reorganized into the Seoul Shinmun by November 23, 1945.

== Background ==
Its predecessor The Korea Daily News had actually been a forerunner in the Korean independence movement. However, its reporting drew the ire of Japan, which was quickly absorbing Korea around that time. After the newspaper's owner Ernest Bethell died, the Japanese and British governments pressured Bethell's successor, Arthur Marnham, to fold and leave the country. He did so on May 21, 1910, selling the newspaper to former employee Yi Changhun (이장훈; 李章薰) for 40,000 won (or 700 British pounds) worth of gold. The 14 June 1408th issue reflects this, with Lee's name given as editor. The Korean independence activists of the paper resigned and denounced it publicly as a propaganda piece.

The paper became strictly controlled by Japan. It changed its name to Maeil sinbo on August 30, 1910. Another pro-Japanese newspaper, Taehan Sinmun, was merged into the paper on September 1.

== History ==
The newspaper then became subordinate to the Japanese-language paper Keijō nippō, and its offices were moved into that paper's building. Japanese journalist Tokutomi Sohō was selected to oversee both the Keijō nippō and Maeil sinbo. Tokutomi warned his Korean staff to avoid anti-Japanese reporting, and to avoid writing with a "biased and polarized mind", as well as to avoid "deceitful and false reportage".

In the 1910s, the Maeil sinbo was one of the only Korean-language newspapers allowed in the country. The local newspaper Gyeongnam Ilbo continued until 1914, when it was eventually pressured into closing. Despite mostly publishing along Japanese lines, the Maeil sinbo also served as a medium for Korean-language literature, and published pieces from many famous Korean writers. It held a number of cultural events that drew tens of thousands of attendees each. These events featured various Korean cultural traditions like pansori, changgeuk, and Korean dance. The Maeil sinbo held a literature contest in August 1919.

After the 1919 March First Movement nationwide protests (which the Maeil sinbo described only as a small disturbance at the time), the Japanese colonial government began allowing more freedom in the press, and granted permission for several Korean-owned newspapers to be founded. Notably, Yi Sanghyŏp quit his job as editor-in-chief of the Maeil sinbo to join the new Dong-a Ilbo newspaper.

It was reorganized into a number of different departments in 1920. On July 2, 1920, it hired the first female Korean reporter, Yi Kakkyŏng (이각경; 李珏璟), and she began working on September 5. The criterion for female reporters that the newspaper wanted was reportedly "1. To be the wife of the head of a household, 2. to be between 20 and 30 years of age, 3. to have graduated from high school and to have writing as a hobby".

From February 1934 to January 1935, it published a monthly magazine called Wŏlgan maeshin (월간매신; 月刊每申). In 1937, it had a news ticker installed on the roof of the Whashin Department Store on Jongno. Beginning in April 1939, (Note: Jeong claims the paper started on April 3, 1938, but the Korean Newspaper Archive claims to have every issue in storage, and they claim April 1939.) it began publishing a Japanese-language youth newspaper called Kokumin shinpō (國民新報; 국민신보).

=== Independence from Keijō nippō ===
Maeil sinbo often experienced management issues and difficulties in continuing to operate. Japanese reporters in the Keijō nippō reportedly looked down on the paper, and called it "The Cancer of Keijō nippō". They felt that their hard-earned money was being used to support the Maeil sinbo and its employees. On April 29, 1938, the Maeil sinbo became independent from the Keijō and changed a character in its name (申 to 新; same pronunciation in Korean). 40% of its shares became owned by private Korean owners, and the remaining 60% became owned by the colonial government. Most of its major executives were Korean by this point, although its finance department was headed and mainly staffed by Japanese people. It was expanded to contain eight pages instead of four. In celebration of these changes, it published a special issue on June 30, 1938, which talked about Korean history and calligraphy.

From November 1938 to September 1944, it published a monthly Japanese-language magazine called Maishin hashin tokupō (每新寫眞特報; later 每新寫眞旬報).

In August 1940, it became the only major daily Korean-language newspaper published in Korea, after its rivals The Chosun Ilbo and The Dong-A Ilbo were made to close by the Japanese government. The colonial government made a point to hire Korean journalists from these papers into the Maeil sinbo in order to appease them. The paper prospered due to its dominance over the market; it came to operate 17 branches and 327 bureaus (지국), and had a circulation of 500,000 copies.

=== End and reorganization into Seoul Shinmun ===
By the early 1940s, the tide of World War II had turned against Japan. Until the very end, the Maeil sinbo highlighted Japan's victories in the war, and advocated for Koreans to be prepared for struggle and for fighting to the death. When the atomic bombs were dropped on Hiroshima and Nagasaki in early August 1945, the newspaper mentioned them briefly and in euphemisms ("new type of bomb"; 신형폭탄; 新型爆彈 instead of "atomic bomb"; 원자폭탄; 原子爆弾) and not as the main headline of the front page.

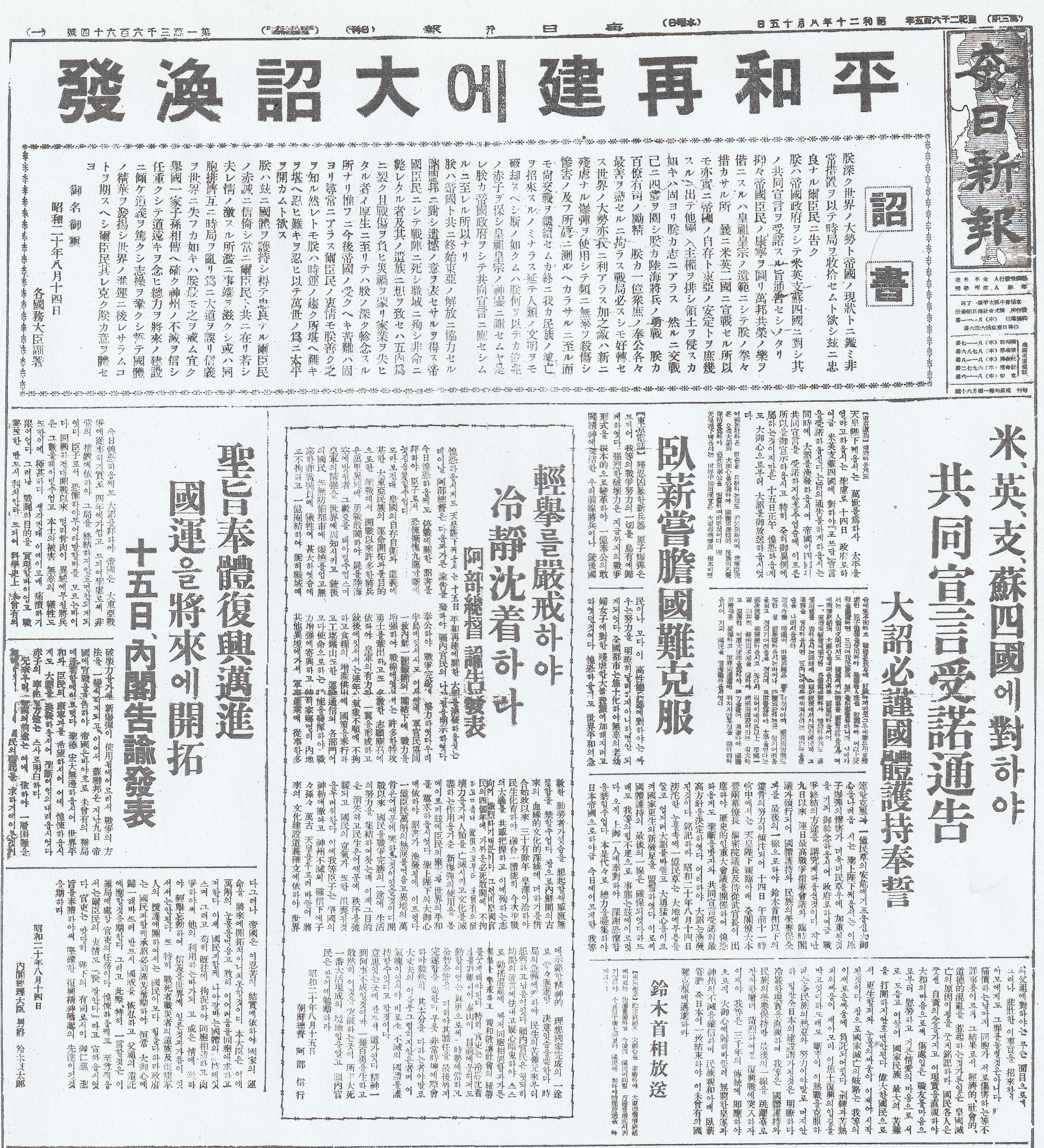
The single-page issue published on the day Japan's surrender was announced (August 15, 1945)

The surrender of Japan was announced to Korea at noon on August 15, 1945. The Maeil sinbo was informed of the announcement the evening prior, and had already prepared an article for the announcement. Shortly after the announcement, it published its article. South Korean historian Jeong Jin-seok (정진석) described the announcement as understated, written in small type and worded indirectly. He theorized that this was done deliberately to quell Korean excitement in response to the announcement.

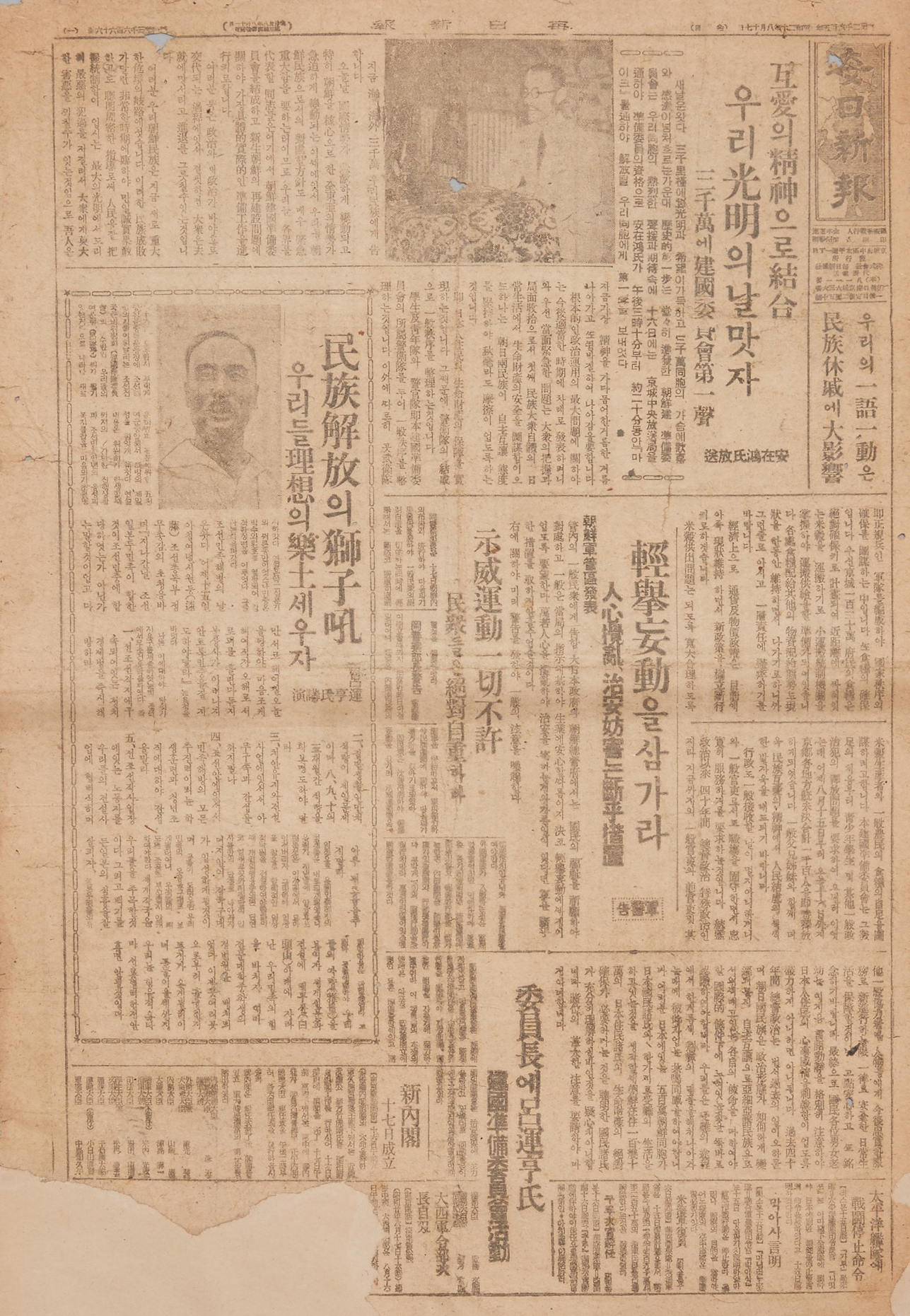
The August 17, 1945, edition, with headline favorably describing Korea's liberation.

By August 17, the Maeil sinbo began to publish in more favorable terms about Korea's liberation. It described the liberation as "the day of light" (광명의 날; 光明의 날), and advocated for the newly-established Committee for the Preparation of Korean Independence.

The Maeil sinbo chairman Lee Seong-geun (이성근) resigned, and the employees took over operation of the paper. The U.S. military arrived on October 2, 1945, and took control of it.

However, the U.S. faced pushback from the around 600 employees. The newspaper and U.S. publicly criticized each other on a number of occasions. On November 10, 1945, the U.S. issued an order for the paper to only be allowed to print a single one-sided issue per day. It was reorganized and resumed publication on November 23, 1945, as Seoul Shinmun. Its first president was independence activist O Se-chang, who had participated in the 1919 March First Movement protests against Japanese rule.

== Content ==
Reporters of the Maeil sinbo were instructed to promote that Japan's takeover was benevolent and noble, and that if Koreans obeyed orders to assimilate, the rewards would be immense. A range of views on the relationship between Korea and Japan were published in the newspaper. Some promoted that Korea and Japan had once been part of the same civilization, and that their reunification was natural. Most editorials assumed that Koreans should "become Japanese", although one identified by historian Mark E. Caprio suggested that a hybrid culture could be formed in the future. The paper advocated a view that assimilation and the learning of the Japanese language should be done gradually, over the course of several generations.

The paper criticized elements of Korean culture and society for the purpose of both assimilation and reform. Some of these criticisms were the same criticisms repeated by Korean scholars for decades, for example, the condemnation of women being married too early.

The paper encouraged women's education, especially to prepare them for what it saw as their primary role in society: educating children at home. Mark E. Caprio writes that Korean women were still treated condescendingly, however, compared to Japanese women. When covering a visit of Korean women to Tokyo, the newspaper wrote that the experience was particularly valuable for the women on the trip. The newspaper wrote that they could learn from Japanese housewives, as Korean women's "knowledge [of modern households] was much shallower" than theirs.

== Legacy ==
The newspaper has a significant position in the history of the Korean press. It was the only major daily Korean-language newspaper available throughout Korea for much of the 1910s and from 1940 to the liberation of Korea in 1945. And shortly after the liberation of Korea, the majority of Korean-language journalists were alumni of the paper.

== List of presidents ==
- 1938–1941 – Ch'oe Rin
- 1941–1945 – Yi Sŏnggŭn

== See also ==
- List of newspapers in Korea
- History of newspapers in Korea
- Category:Japanese-language newspapers published in Korea
