= Chōsen Art Exhibition =

1922–1944 art exhibition in colonial Korea

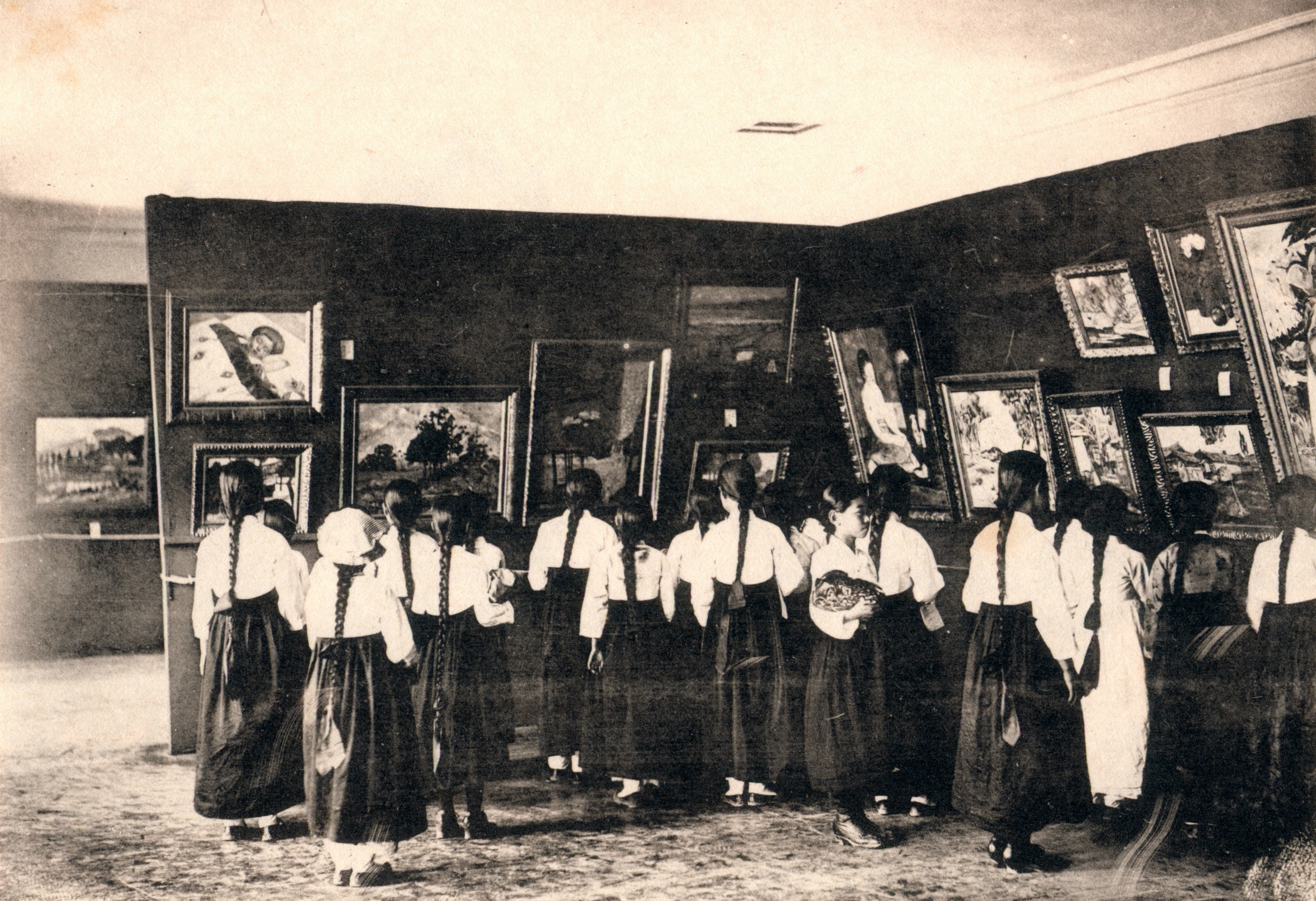
Korean students gathered around paintings at the June 1922 Chōsen Art Exhibition

The Chōsen Art Exhibition (Japanese: 朝鮮美術展覽會, Hepburn: Chōsen Bijutsu Tenrankai; Korean: 조선미술전람회; short names 鮮展; 朝鮮美展) was an annual art exhibition and competition in Korea, Empire of Japan that ran between 1922 and 1944.

== History ==
The exhibition ran during the 1910 to 1945 Japanese colonial period. It was established by the Japanese Government-General of Chōsen as part of its reform efforts in the wake of the 1919 March First Movement protests. At the time, there was no major organization for the arts in Korea. The government first considered establishing an art school, but considered that too expensive. They established this art exhibition instead.

The first exhibition was attended by around 3,000 people. People stood in line before the doors opened for hours in advance. This and each exhibition thereafter was covered in detail by newspapers of the time, including the Korean-owned The Dong-A Ilbo and The Chosun Ilbo, as well as the Japanese-owned Maeil Sinbo. The second and third exhibitions had around 30,000 visitors each. Admission fees were collected, with adults charged 20 sen, children 10 sen, and 5 for students or group visitors. In its first year, 291 people submitted 430 works, and 215 works by 171 people were selected. Each year, the number of entrants increased, with over 1,000 per year by the 1930s.

For much of the exhibition's history, it did not have a consistent venue. In the early 1920s, it was held at a Government-General building normally used for trade shows (now in Jeo-dong). Later that decade, it was held in the Government-General of Chōsen Library (now in Sogong-dong). From 1930, it was held in the former royal palace Gyeongbokgung, using facilities created for the 1929 Chōsen Exhibition. Finally, in 1937, a hall specifically for the Chōsen Art Exhibition was added to the Government-General Museum of Chōsen, at the rear of Gyeongbokgung.

The first Korean allowed to be a judge, Kim Ton-hŭi, judged in 1930 and 1931. It was not until 1937 that another Korean was allowed to be a judge, but he reportedly was not allowed much influence on the decisions.

== Description ==
The exhibition was modelled after the Japan Fine Arts Exhibition. It was initially divided into three categories: oriental art, Western paintings and sculpture, and calligraphy. The categories were reorganized in 1932, with calligraphy being put into a new crafts category. It was seen as a premiere authority for the art world of Korea, and seen as a venue to challenge social norms. Nudity featured in some of the art (only drawn; photographed nudity was not allowed), which was seen as scandalous at the time.

Japanese people who had lived in Korea for more than six months were eligible to enter. Early on, they were around 70% of entrants. In response to this, the magazine Kaebyŏk published an article in its July 1924 edition that critically examined the ratio of Korean to Japanese entrants per year. It described the Chōsen Art Exhibition as a "festival for the Japanese, with Korean bystanders".

Winners were selected by panels of various judges, who were mainly Japanese. Various awards and recognitions were granted based on a number of criteria. Winners often received significant recognition, and often had their work purchased later. People would reportedly observe what won the prior year, and borrow ideas from the winners.

== Legacy ==
The exhibition had a significant impact on the development of modern Korean art. According to Mok Su-hyeon, the influence of Western art become increasingly visible in Korean artworks in the exhibition over time. However, the significant Japanese control over the structure of the exhibition and its judges has been evaluated as creating a disproportionate valuation of Western and Japanese art, and minimization of Korean art. Despite this, traditional Korean art was shown and promoted at the exhibition. Many significant figures in the Korean art world during and after this period participated in or had been involved with the exhibition in some capacity. After the 1945 liberation of Korea, the Republic of Korea Art Exhibition succeeded the exhibition, and based its practices largely on those of the Chōsen Art Exhibition.
