= Korean Army =

Korean Army may refer to:

== Current armies ==
- Korean People's Army (North Korea, 1932–)
- Republic of Korea Army (South Korea, 1948–)

== Historical armies ==
- Japanese Korean Army (1904–45)
- Imperial Korean Armed Forces (1897–1910)
- Joseon Army (14th century – 1897)

=== Rebel groups described as armies ===
- Righteous army: Informal armies during various periods of Korean history
- Korean Liberation Army (1940–1946): Korean independence movement group
