= Jinwidae =

Imperial Korean military unit

Jinwidae 진위대
- Active: 1895–1907
- Country: Joseon; Korean Empire
- Branch: Army
- Type: Infantry
- Size: approx. 18,000 (1901)

Jinwidae (Korean: 진위대; Hanja: 鎭衛隊) was an organization of the Imperial Korean Army established in September 1895 by Gojong of Korea when he knew that Hullyŏndae was part of the assassination of Empress Myeongseong.

== History ==
Jinwidae was a force deployed in the countryside. At first, two battalions were formed. One was deployed in Jeonju, and the other one was deployed in Pyongyang. One battalion included less than 500 men, including the officers. In 1897, 10,000 Won was deployed for Jinwidae. In July 1900, Jinwidae was reassigned with 6 regiments. Jibangdae, which comprised an old-style army, joined Jinwidae in September 1900. By August 1901, Jinwidae had 6 regiments of 18 battalions which is 18,000 men in total. 1 Regiment included about 2,000 men. However, after Russo-Japanese War ended with the victory of Empire of Japan, Jinwidae was shrinking in Numbers. Eighteen battalions shrank to 8 battalions, making it less than 3,000 men.

== Dissolution ==
Jinwidae was planned to be dismissed after the Japan-Korea Treaty of 1907 was signed. When Siwidae was dismissed and the Battle of Namdaemun happened, this news was told to soldiers of Jinwidae. Jinwidae fought against the Imperial Japanese Army. With the Righteous army, much Jinwidae personnel fought against Japan. However, Jinwidae was dismissed as was planned. By 3 September 1907, every force of Jinwidae was dismissed.

== Purpose ==
Jinwidae was the army that was deployed in the countryside. With Jibangdae, an old fashioned army, Jinwidae was involved in policing the deployed area, suppressing revolts against the government, and catching criminals of the area.

== Gallery ==
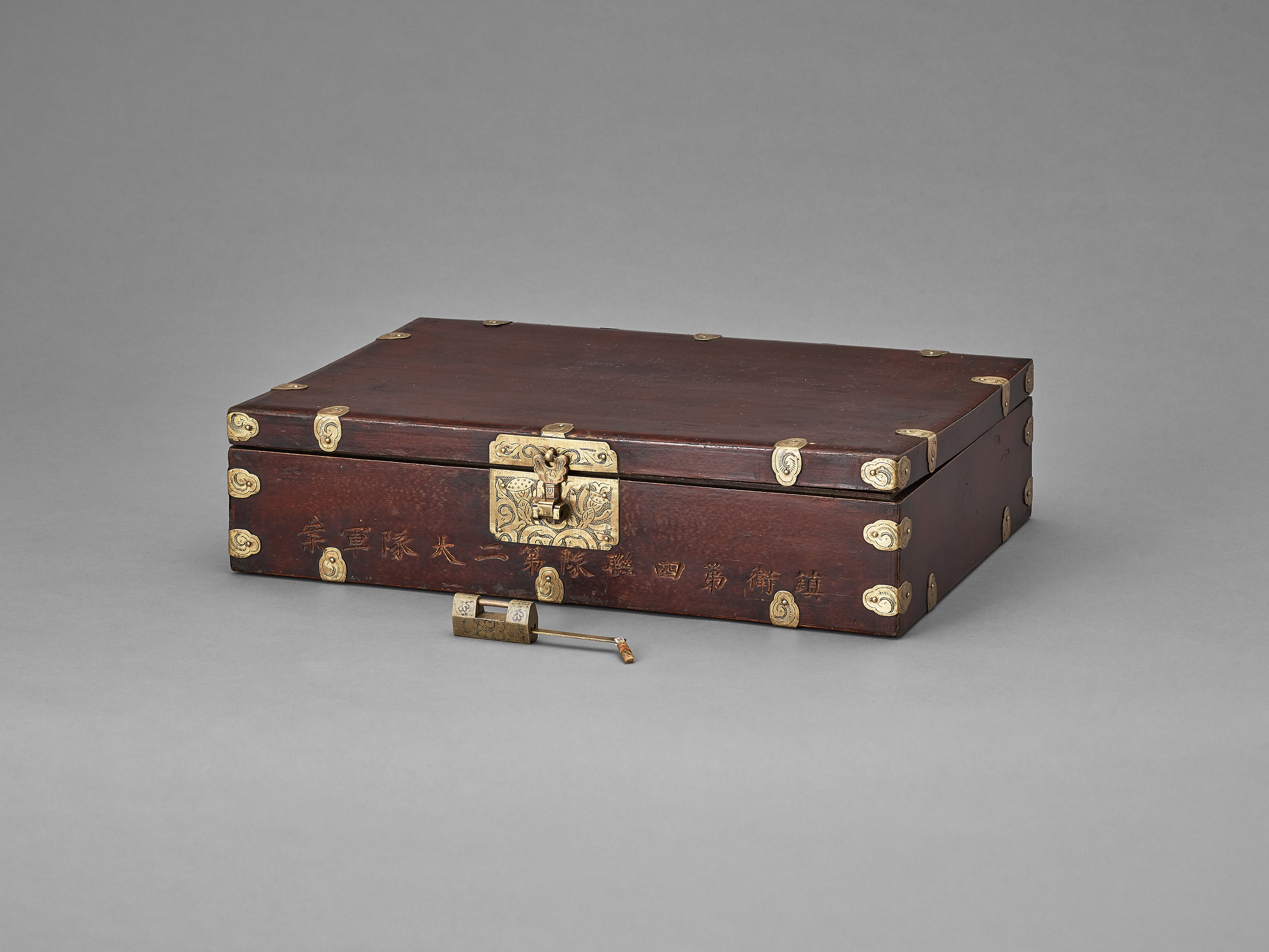
Military case of Jinwidae

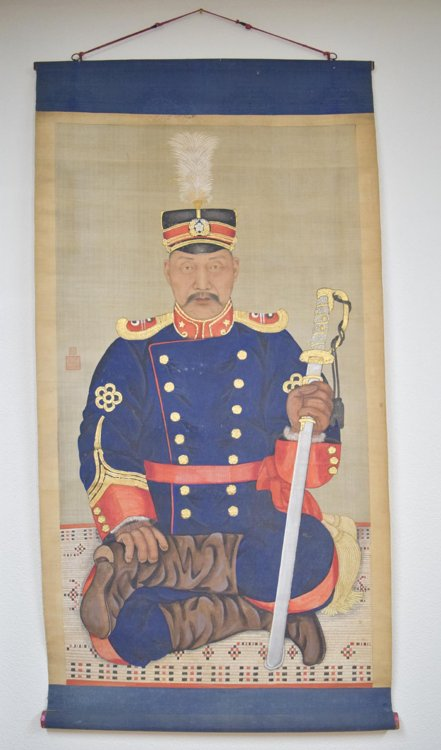
Painting of an officer of Jinwidae, Hwang Seok in his dress uniform

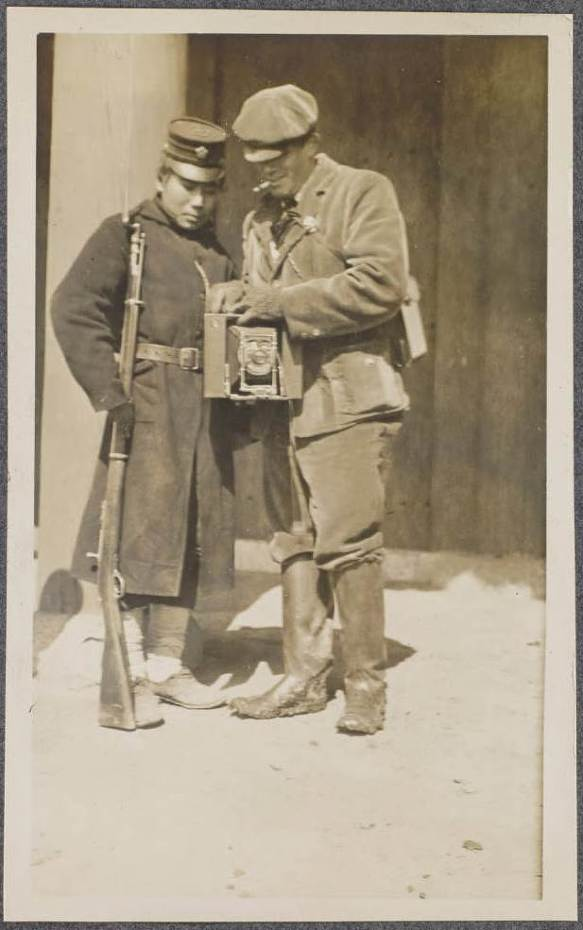
Jinwidae deployed in Pyeongyang

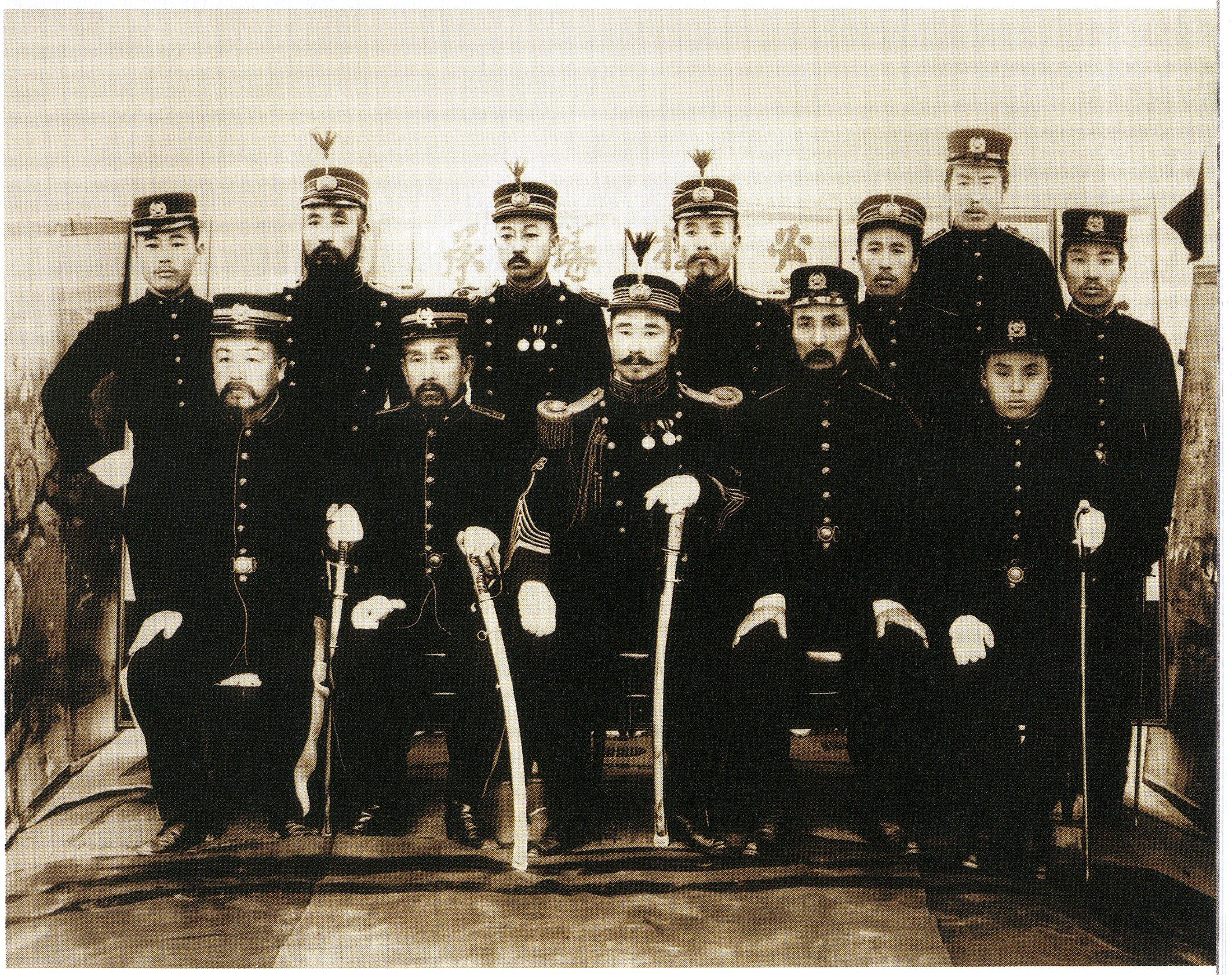
Ganghwa Jinwidae

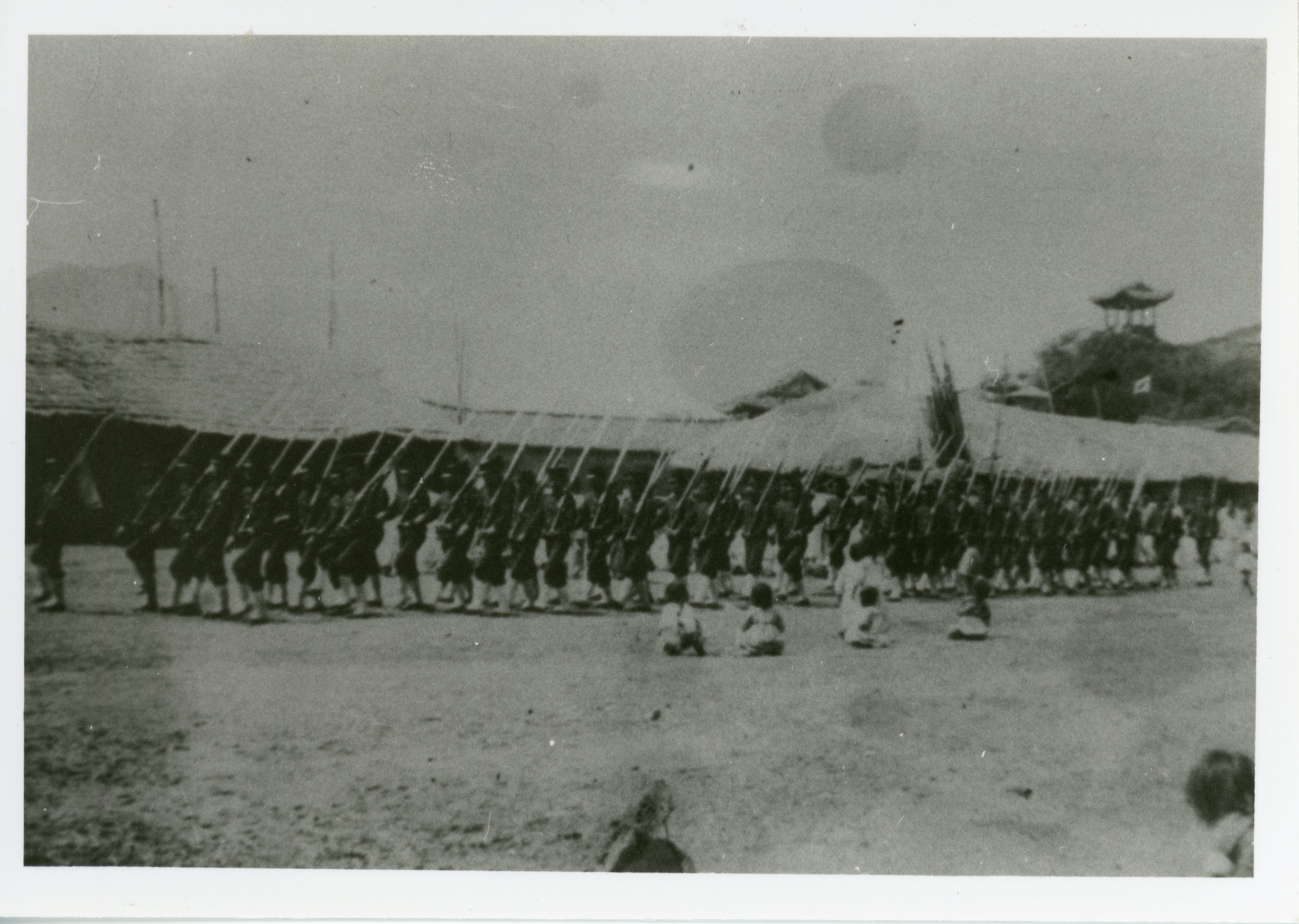
Jinwidae in Tongyoung before dissolution
