= Imperial Korean Armed Forces =

1897–1910 military of the Korean Empire

- 대한제국군 (Korean); 大韓帝國 (Hanja)

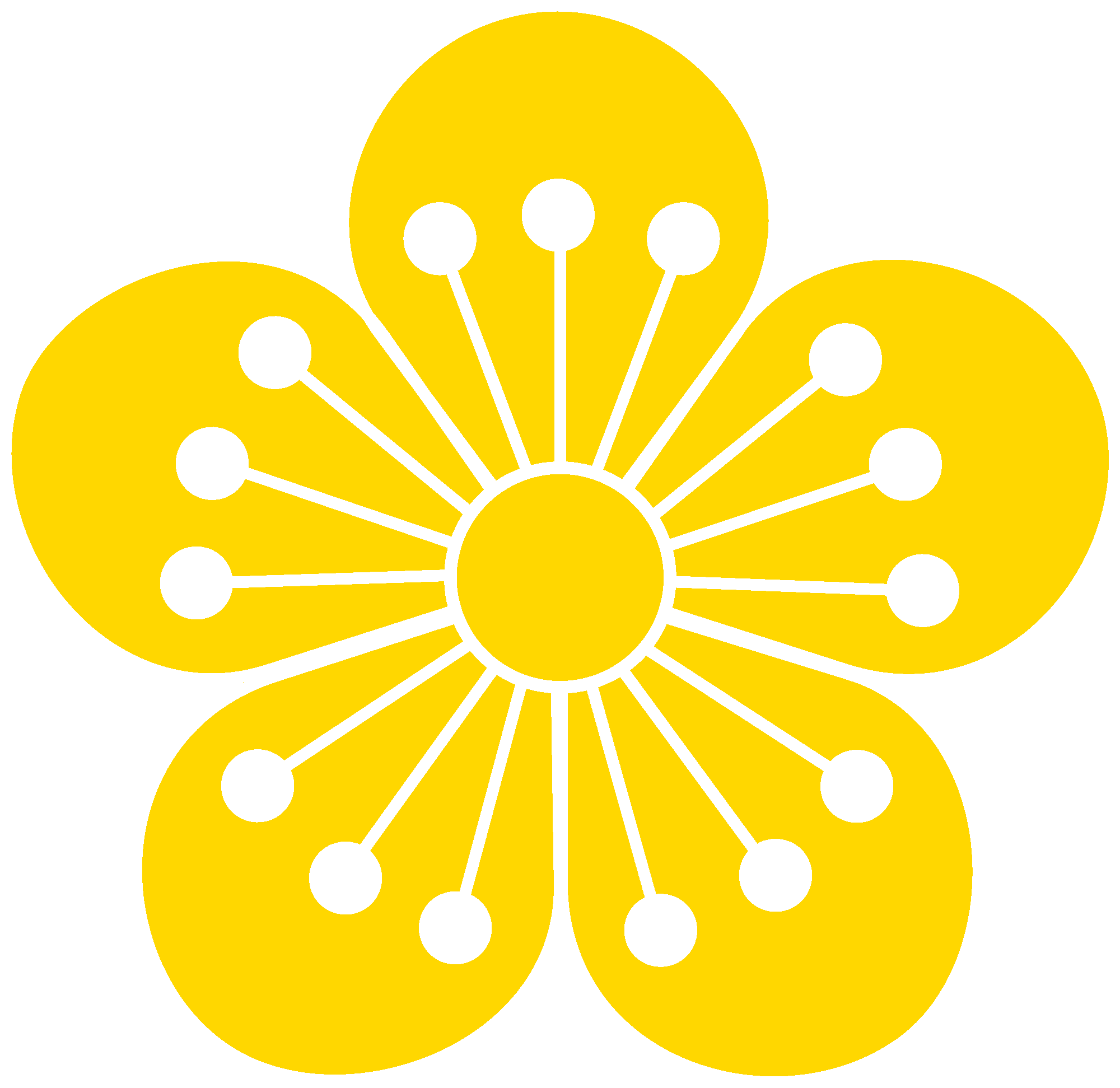
- Founded: 13 October 1897
- Disbanded: 1910
- Service branches: Imperial Guards; Imperial Korean Army; Imperial Korean Navy; Provincial Army

Leadership
- Emperor of Korea: Emperor Gojong; Emperor Sunjong
- Minister of the Military: Cho Hui-yon (First); Yi Byeong-mu (last)

Personnel
- Active personnel: 28,000 (1907)

Related articles
- History: Military history of Korea: Korean invasion of Manchuria; Battle of Namdaemun; Boxer Rebellion

The Imperial Korean Armed Forces (Korean: 대한제국군; Hanja: 大韓帝國軍; RR: Daehan jeguk gun; lit. 'Korean Empire Army') was the military of the Korean Empire, it was ended in 1910, when the Imperial Japanese Army annexed the Korean Empire and occupied the territories of Korea.

== History ==
=== Foundation ===
Succeeding the Joseon Army and Navy, the Gwangmu Reform reorganized the military into a modern western-style military. The foundation of the Imperial Korean Army started when Inoue Kaoru argued that the King should modernize the military and the commanding system in 1895. Korea established many military academies in Korea. Gojong of Korea tried to install his guards, but because of the interruptions of Japan, it was hard to use the Capital Guards (Siwidae,(시위대), (侍衛隊)) as his palace guards. But when the Japanese were being interrupted by other European countries, the Siwidae was formed as Gojong's guards. The minister of the military supervises the training of the Siwidae. However, the Siwidae was disbanded in August of that year for failing to stop the Japanese from assassinating Empress Myeongseong.

=== Russian instructors ===
Following Min Young-hwan's journey to Russia, he brought 14 Russian military instructors led by Dmitry Putyata in October 1896. Minister of Military Yi Yun-yong requested training 2,200 men to be trained by these instructors. Russian instructors picked 800 men and specially trained these men. By February 1897, Chinwidae was expanded to 1,080 men so that Gojong's return to his palace would be easier.

=== Era of Gwangmu Reform ===
After proclaiming the empire, Gojong consolidated his absolute control over military by the establishment of Board of Marshals. By the time Gojong established the Board of Marshals, military of Korean Empire was fragmented. Even the Bobusangs, who used to work for the emperor were trying to build their own army. He thought that such fragmentation of military would be an impediment when coping the imminent crisis caused by the conflict of Russia and Japan. Many of the authorities of Ministry of Military was taken by the Boards of Marshals as a result.

As a way to increase and maintain the Imperial authority, the Imperial government decided to expand Siwidae, stationed at Seoul. On 27 May 1898, the two battalions of Siwidae were integrated to one regiment, and Lieutenant Colonel Cho Tong-yun was appointed as the commander of the 1st Siwi Regiment. In July, an artillery battalion armed with modern cannons was formed as an independent company. Starting from August 1899, the Imperial government recognized the need to expand Siwidae even further so that the Siwi regiment would be a proper combat unit. Cavalry battalion consisting of 408 men was formed. Moreover in December 1900, the artillery company was expanded to battalion and was subordinated to the regiment. With the expansion of artillery, one platoon of military band was established. Siwidae was even further expanded in February 1902, as one more Siwi Regiment was established. By this time, Siwidae totaled about 3,000 men.

=== Under Japanese Pressure ===
At the dawn of the Russo-Japanese War, Japanese forcefully signed the Japan–Korea Treaty of February 1904 and made supply in Korea much easier. They not only stationed Japanese Korean Army in Yongsan, but also established a military base in Dokdo. In May 1904, Japanese declared official deployment of their army in Korea and started to minimize the Korean army. They stated that using 43 percent of the total tax expenditure in the army was extravagant, stating that Japanese forces will be the proxy for the Imperial Korean Army as armed force.

As the Japanese victory seemed apparent, Japanese confiscated most of the rights of the Board of Marshals, and even disbanded the organization in late 1904, weakening the authority of the emperor. Other than the dissolvement Board of Marshals, the Gungichang was disestablished, and Ministry of Military went through further reduction.

== Dissolution and Resistance ==
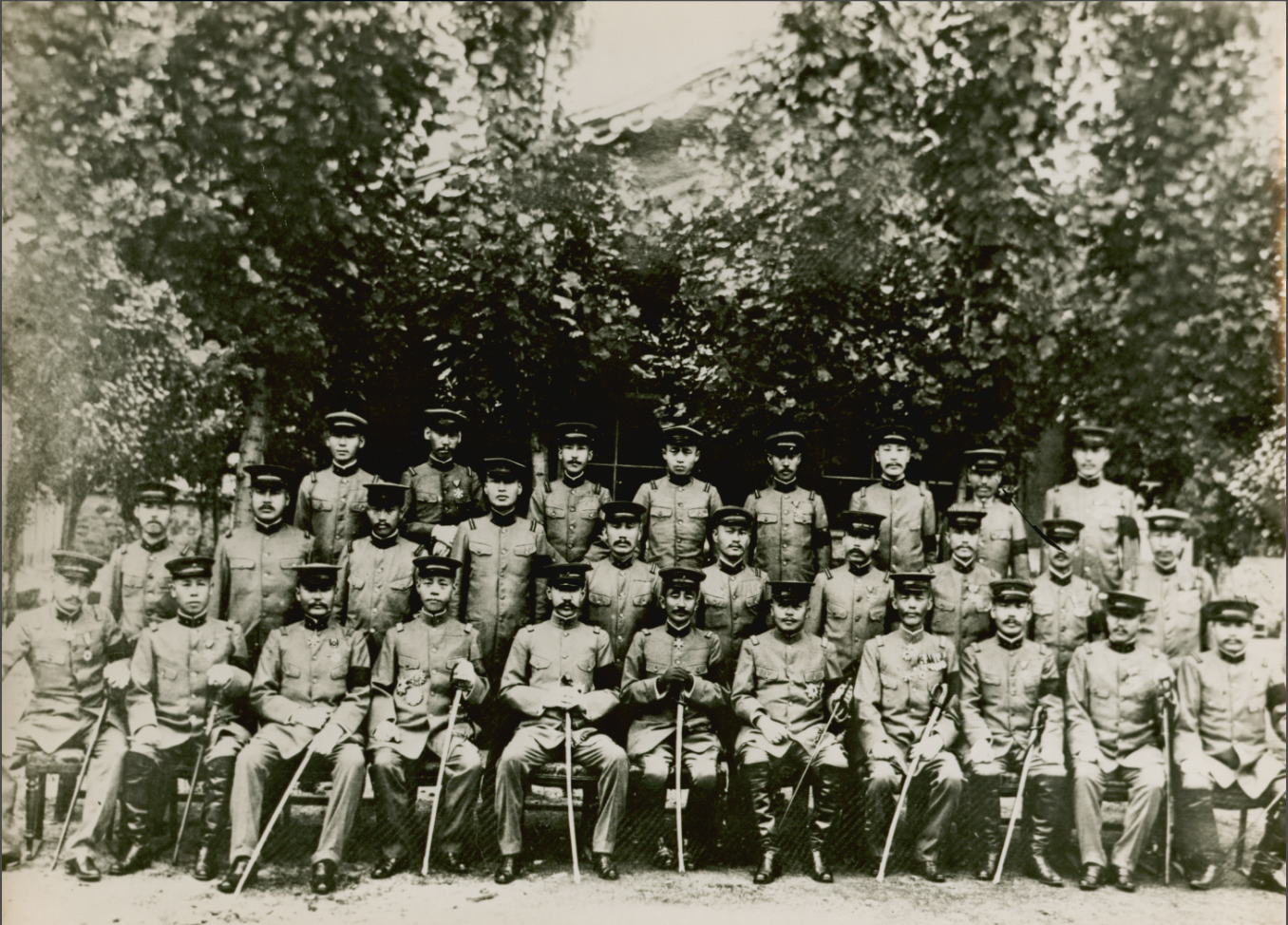
Officers of Joseon Infantry Division

=== Dissolution ===
After Japan's victory in the Russo-Japanese War in 1905, the Japanese forced the Korean ministers to sign the Japan–Korea Treaty of 1905. As per the treaty, the Korean government disbanded the Navy and reduced the numbers of the Imperial Army's City Guards and the Garrison Guards. The total number of Garrison Guards was less than 3,000. Their ships, such as the Guangjae, transported coal from 1941 until Korea's independence from Japan. The army disbanded on August 1, 1907, as per the Japan–Korea Treaty of 1907. From midnight, it rained in Seoul. There was an order to gather in Namdaemun. In Namdaemun, Major Park Seung-hwan committed suicide out of guilt for not protecting the country. His death incited the Korean Army to loot their armories, that was confiscated by the Japanese earlier, and fight against the Japanese army, beginning the Battle of Namdaemun. Still, the Japanese anticipated this and suppressed them after nearly four hours of fighting. 13 officers and 57 enlisted were killed as a result of the battle. On August 30, 1907, many officers were removed from their position.

Emperor Sunjong's incorporated the remaining soldiers into the Imperial Retinue Guard, which continued even after the annexation in 1910. After disbanding the central army in 1907, the provincial armies gradually separated. As a result, the provincial soldiers joined the Righteous Armies before the disbandment. The Military Academy was minimized in size that number of new cadets became 15. The academy was finally disbanded in September 1909. Remaining cadets were sent to Imperial Japanese Army Academy. After the dissolution, some cadets who studied abroad returned Korea and served under tight Japanese intervention and served under the Joseon Infantry Division, while some led the independence movement.

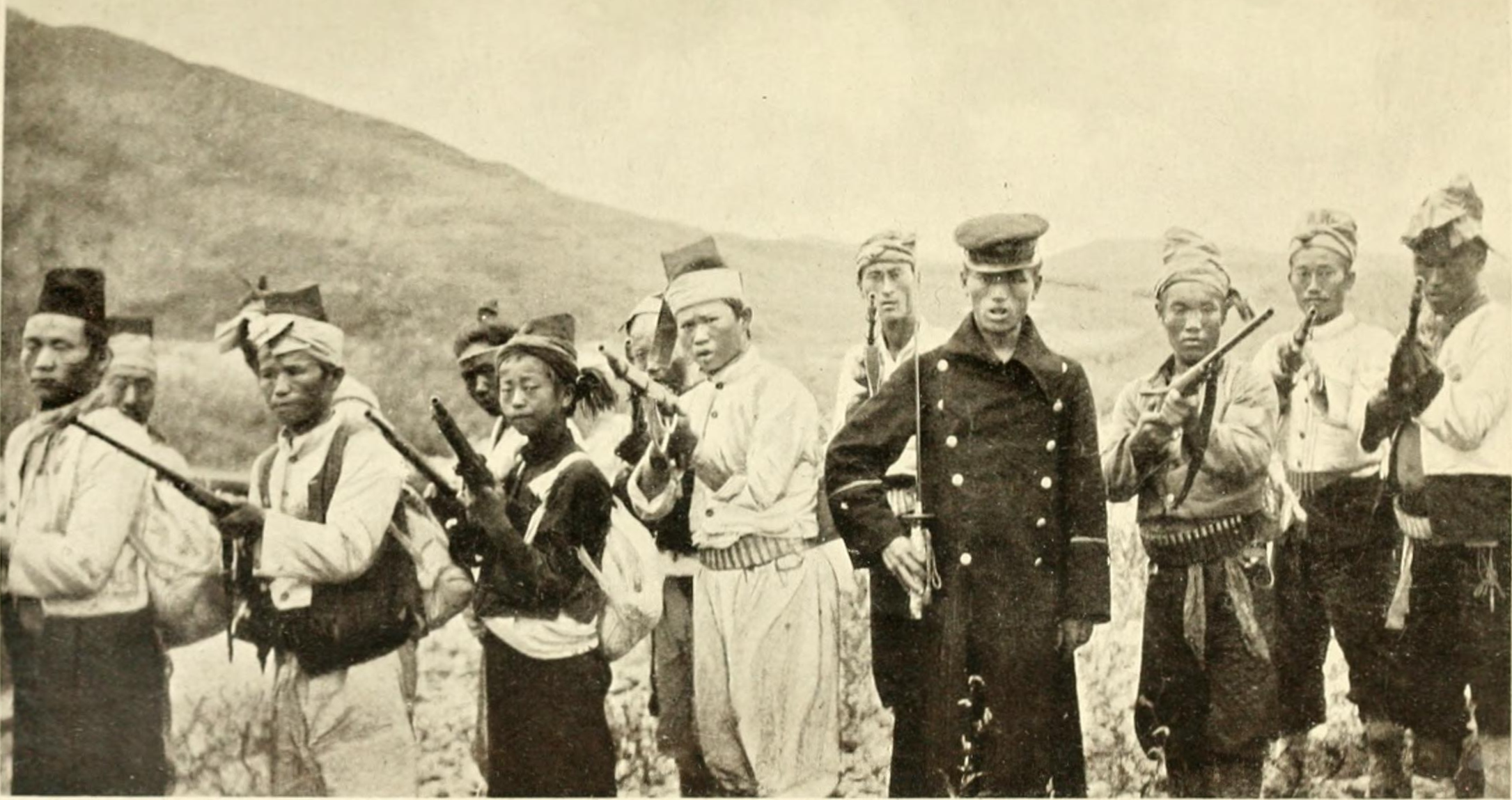
A band of Righteous Army troops. Amongst them is a IKAF Non-Commissioned Officer, holding his sabre.

=== Resistance Against the Japanese Occupation ===
Despite many modern theories and the presence of the Joseon Infantry Division leads to a hasty generalization that most of the troops and officers had simply accepted the disbandment with grace, historical evidences do say otherwise. Although some fraction of the army did indeed join the Imperial Japanese Army, the Kempeitai, and the Police, the majority of the Armed Forces had already began rebelling starting from the Battle of Namdaemun.

The remnants of the Imperial Army, now merged with other civilians in the Righteous armies or in some rare cases composed mostly of former Army personnel, were shown to be different than the regular civilian-composed forces. The IJA seems to have been frequently met with consistent amount of Volley fire, Skirmish lines, Encirclement, and Bayonet charges whilst trying to kill or apprehend them, initially mistaking them for civilian Ui-byeongs. In Jecheon, Japanese troops had to withdraw chaotically, leaving all of their critically injured or dead men behind just to survive a skirmish from a IKAF Remnant unit led by an Imperial Army officer. This unit, like many uibyeongs down south, was barely suppressed only after the aforementioned unit arrived two years later, now with an entire Expeditionary force consisting of a brigade level force of 2,260 IJA troops(two regiments from mainland Japan), Kempeitai, Local Police, and a total 100,000 pro Japanese Militiamen of the Iljinhoe. Simultaneously, despite being disbanded, those of the Capital Guard or Jinwidae units stationed near Seoul and Gyunggi resisted the dissolution were possibly still active as in one record, in Suwon station in august 15th, 1907 dozens of black uniform clad troops came and shot at IJA personnel, which would've been impossible if all of them accepted dissolution.

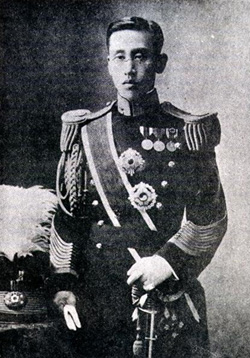
Prince Imperial and Lieutenant General Ui(Yi Kang). After annexation, unlike many of his fellows in the royal court, he actively participated in the independence movement.

While many enlisted and lower ranking officers did join the Righteous armies, the fate of higher ranking officers, especially generals differ by individual generals and colonels themselves. While quite a few generals like Prince Imperial Yi(Lieutenant General), Yi Tojae(Also Lieutenant General), Han Kyusŏl(Prime Minister and also Lieutenant General), Yi Yong-ik(Lieutenant General), Min Yŏnghwan(Lieutenant General), Sim Sang-Hun(Lieutenant General), and such had actively participated and many field grade officers and such had done so, but many of the other Generals in the IKAF, like Yi Jong-geon did surrender their dignity and ultimately accepted the annexation.

== Organization ==
The military system of the Korean Empire consisted of imperial guards, central troops, and provincial troops. It consisted of infantry, artillery, machine gunners, and cavalry. Unlike in the Joseon Dynasty, service was voluntary.

=== Ministry of Military ===
In 1895, the government established the Ministry of Military as part of the Gabo Reform. The job of the ministry was to control the military government and supervise military forces and bases. The first Minister of Military was Cho Hui-yon.

=== Board of Marshals ===
By Gojong's intention to enhance the authority of the emperor, he commissioned himself as the Grand Field Marshal and became the supreme commander of army and navy in June 1898. Next year, Gojong established Board of Marshals in his palace, while weakening the authority of the Ministry of Military.

=== Training ===
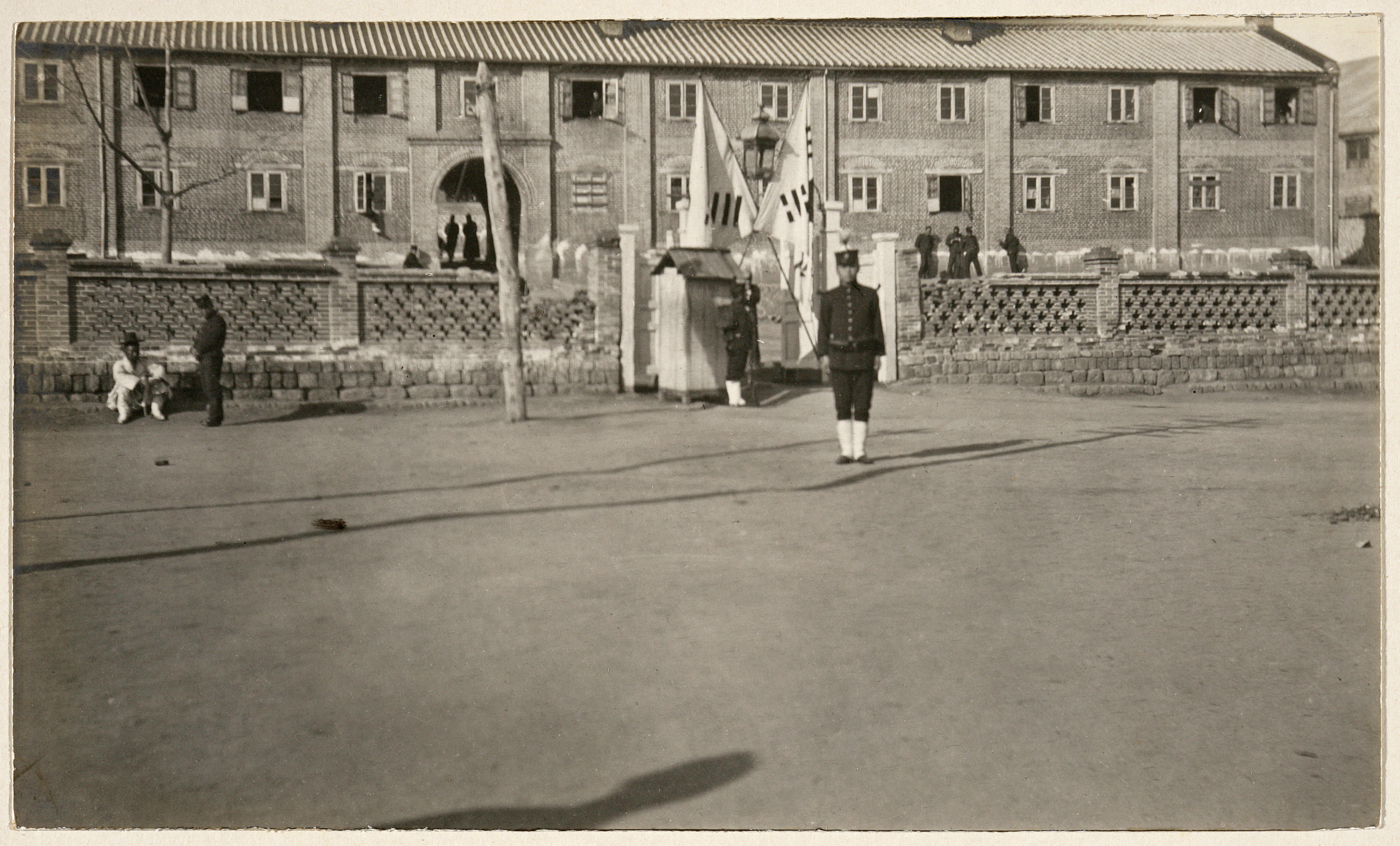
Imperial Korean Army barracks in Seoul, 1906

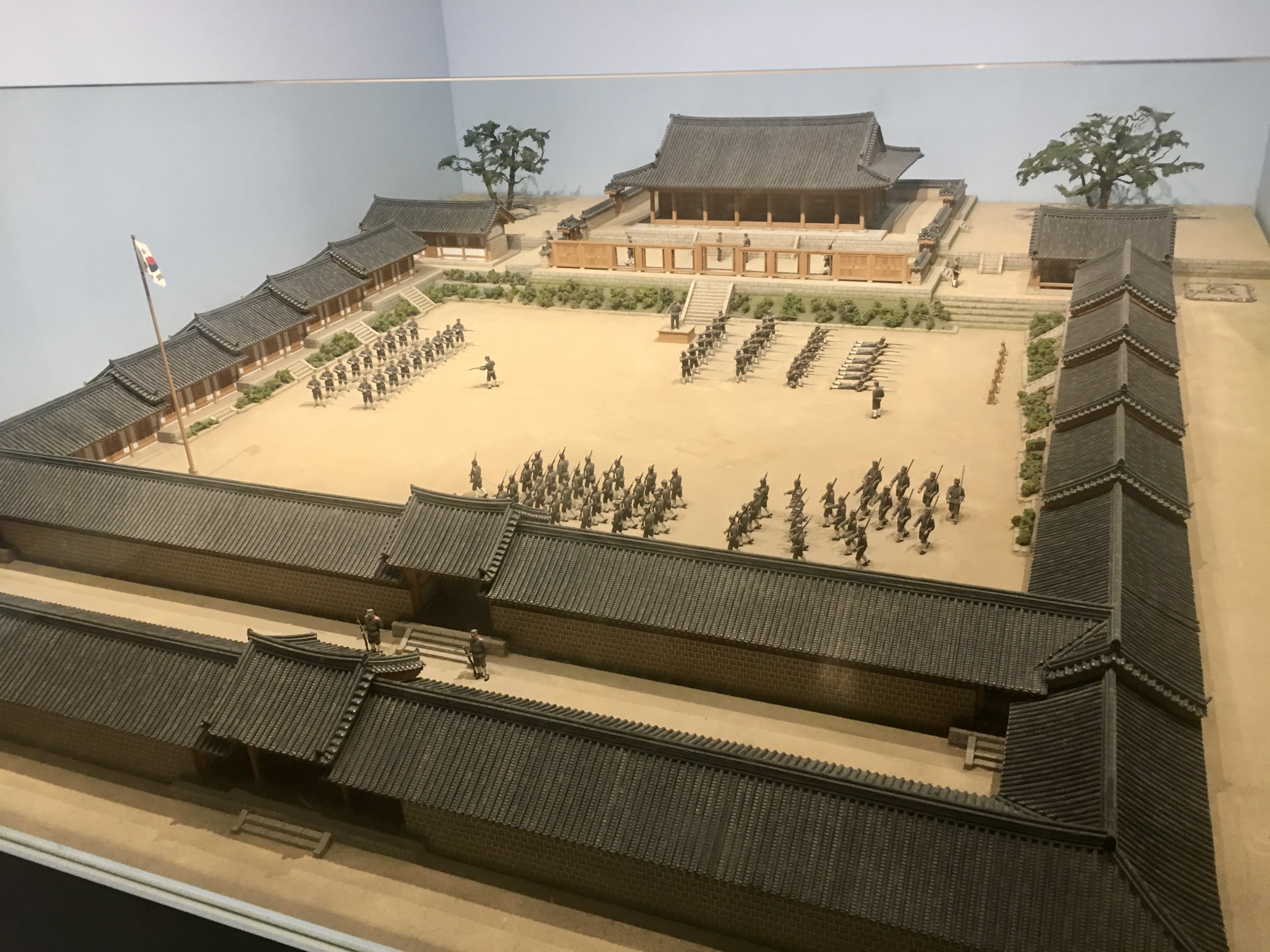
Military Training of Siwidae (Imperial Guards) in the Korean Empire

The Imperial Korean Army had 44 barracks, formally training in marksmanship and drills. Foreign military officers like the Russians volunteered to train the soldiers. Aside from the military academies, there was also the need to educate new officers. In 1896, the military established the Yeonmugongwon (연무공원,鍊武公院), the Military Academy of the Korean Empire, with an officer training program to begin making the Imperial Korean Army more on par with that of the Chinese and Japanese.

The purpose of the training was to make troops more useful on the battlefield. Officers higher than company leaders were responsible for enlisted men and officers' training. Also, training was done in many environments and in many different ways to make the troops more suitable for war.

==== Military Academy of the Korean Empire ====
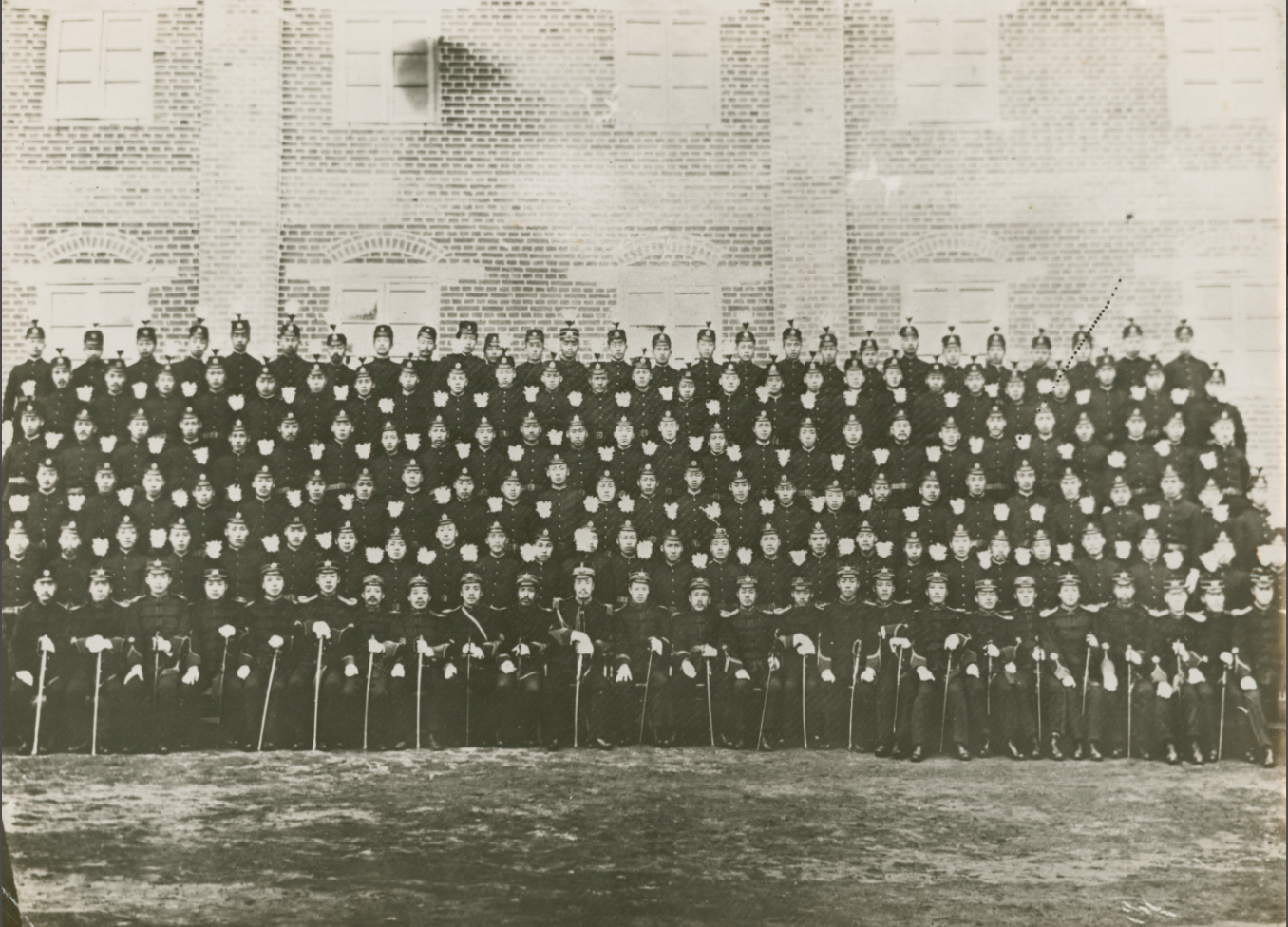
Cadets and officers of the Military Academy before 1900

On 1 July 1898, the Military Academy of the Korean Empire was established and subordinated to the Ministry of Military. Then on 22 June 1899, the academy became subordinated to the Board of Marshals as an effort of Gojong solidifying the military of Korea. The staff consisted of one major as the principal, one adjutant, one surgeon, one head instructor, three instructors, and eight assistants. Mostly, principal was selected from military officers, who were educated abroad. Cadets were healthy and wise 20–30 years old, who got a recommendation from an officer. 495 cadets were commissioned as officer after their graduation. 291 out of 495 commissioned cadets were deployed in Jinwidae or Siwidae. Even though the academy was an academy for education of nationalist officers, not all of the graduates were Nationalists. This was because some sons of Yangbans saw entering the academy as a way for an assured career. Despite not every cadet was motivated by their nationalist sentiment, many graduates of the academy joined the Righteous army, and opposed Japanese colonization.

=== Imperial Korean Army ===
In 1897, the Imperial Korean Army comprised the central army and the provincial armies. It was as part of strengthening the Korean Empire's National Defense. The central army's backbone is the Imperial Guard consisting of the Attendant (Chinwidae, (친위대), (親衛隊)), and Retinue (Howidae, (호위대)), (扈衛隊)) Guards, and the Capital Guard. The central army was directly under the Board of Marshal's member, Marshal Jung Ae-Kun to defend the emperor and the capital city of Hanyang. The provincial armies (Jibangdae, (지방대), (地方隊)) and the garrison guards (Jinwidae, (진위대), (鎭衛隊)) defend the borders. With the central and provincial armies, the army grew immensely to 28,000 before 1907.

In 1904, the editor of Jeguk Sinmun criticized the incapacity of the army that foreigners employed their foreign army instead of the Korean Army, which shows that the Korean army is under the standard.

==== Central Army ====
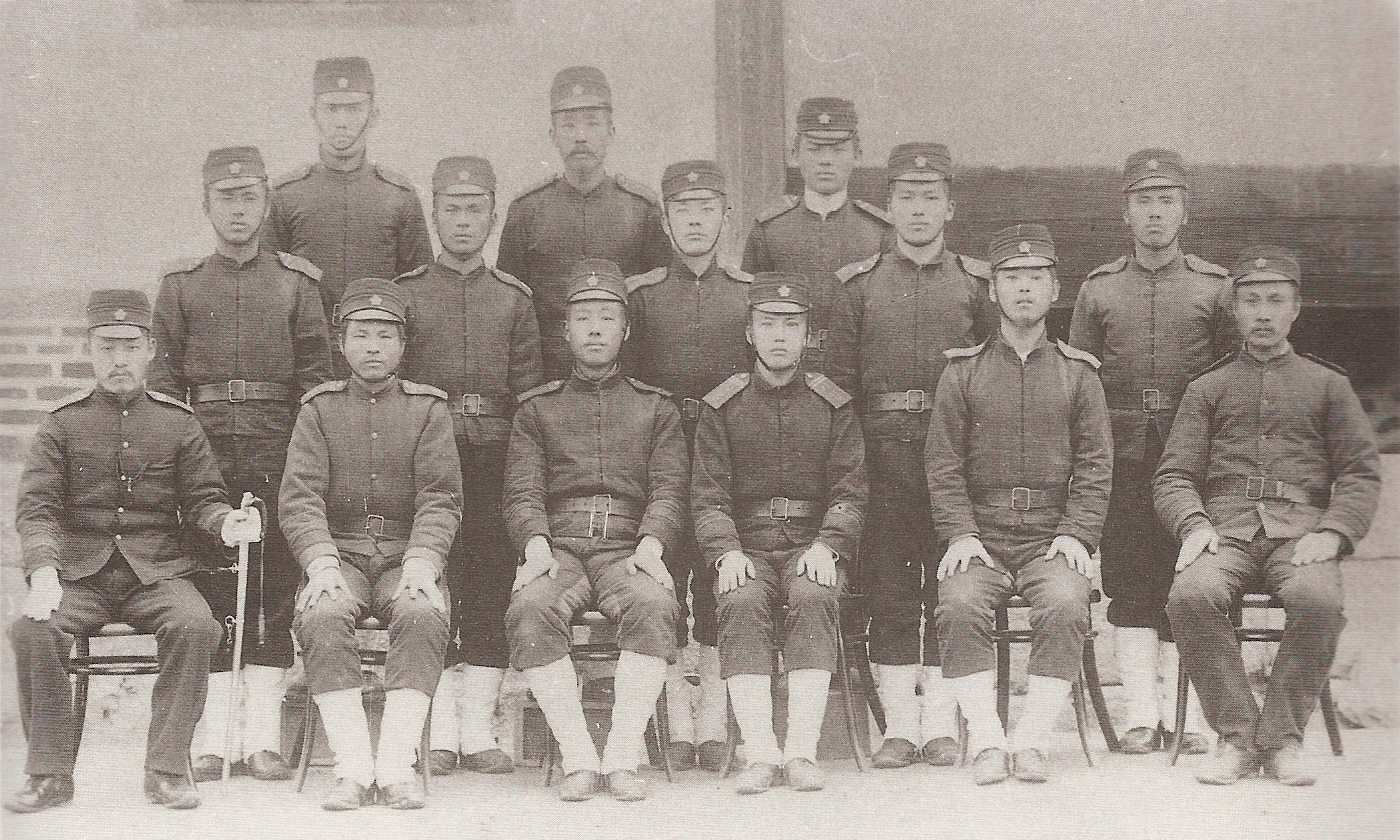
Soldiers of the Imperial Korean Army, 1898

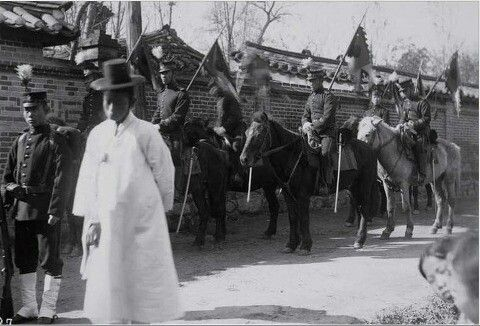
Cavalry of the Imperial Korean Army

In 1895, the Imperial Attendant Guard served as the army's core and palace guards. The Attendant Guard grew to two battalions of 1,700 troops, each battalion consisting of companies of 220 men. In March 1896, Gojong added three more battalions to the Attendant Guard, establishing a total of five battalions with 4,400 men. The Ministry of the Interior assigned the 3rd battalion as the Imperial Retinue Guard. They were directly in charge of escorting the Imperial Family nearby, and Gojong was in charge of the Retinue Guard before the Gabo Reform. But after the reform, the Ministers of the Palace, Military, Finance, and Education concurrently holds the position of commander of the Attendant Guard. They reorganized the Retinue Guard into an engineer corps. Still, they disbanded due to unstable domestic situations. On April 22, Gojong reorganized two battalions into one regiment divided by ten companies which followed the Russian military system. It consisted of one independent battalion, and another battalion into a cavalry battalion. In 1900, Gojong reestablished the Retinue Guard with 730 soldiers. In 1902, the Attendant Guard expanded to two regiments.

In 1897, the military reestablished the Capital Guards to serve as part of the central army and as the Gyeongungung (경운궁), (慶運宮)) palace guards. It consisted of some units of the Attendant Guard with one battalion of 1,000 men divided by five companies as its organization method and recruited Russian officers to train them. It soon expanded into a regiment of 1,070 troops, with up to 200 guards each company. Then each regiment has expanded into three infantry battalions of 3,000 troops and one artillery battalion of 652 men consisting of one artillery company and two mountain artillery companies. As of October 1902, the military established an additional regiment making two regiments and one independent cavalry battalion of 4,300 troops. Each regiment has four infantry battalions, two artillery battalions, and a cavalry battalion under the direct control of the Board of Marshals, such as the 1st Siwi Regiment. Then it grew to a total number of troops was 4,672 men, 400 cavalry, and 102 military bands, totaling 5,174 men.

==== Provincial Army ====
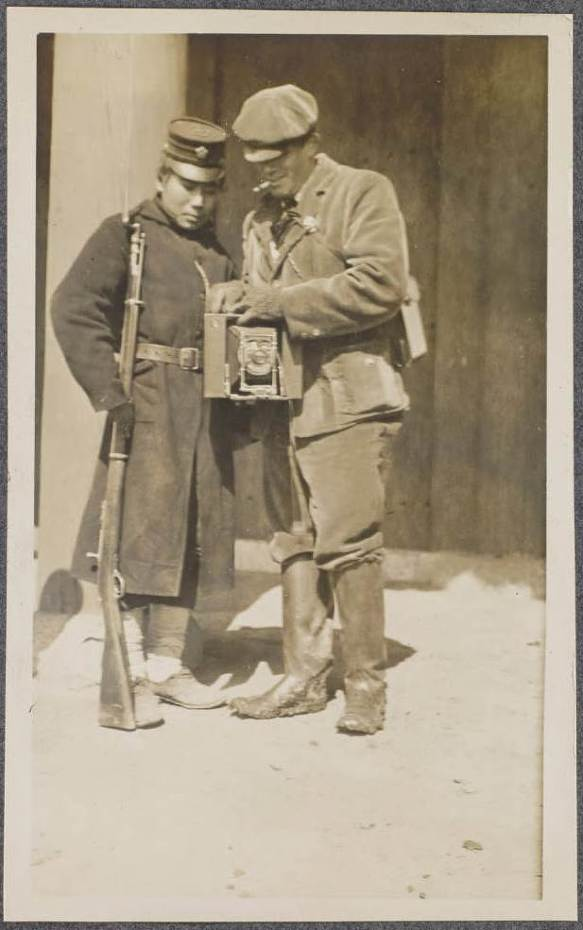
Jinwidae deployed in Pyeongyang

The Board of Marshals administers the provincial armies. In May 1896, they expanded and divided them into eight battalions ranging from 200 to 600 troops and assigned battalion commanders (majors) to command them. But in September 1896, the standard number of troops in a unit drew to 400 troops, and they expanded into fourteen battalions with 5,600 troops. They also served as a transitional military unit to reorganize outdated soldiers into the first modern provincial army, the Garrison Guard. On June 30, 1900, King Gojong ordered the Board of Marshals to incorporate some provincial battalions into the Garrison Guard. At first, the military deployed one garrison guard battalion to Jeonju and Pyongyang, and each battalion consisted of two companies. However, in the case of the garrison guard battalion in Pyeongyang, which was in charge of the defense of the north, it followed the central army method of one battalion of 1,000 men divided by five companies. The Garrison Guard forces grew significantly to prevent foreign interference and stabilize the regime. In July 1900, the army established 18 battalions into six Garrison Guard regiments with headquarters in Ganghwa, Suwon, Daegu, Pyongyang, Bukcheong, Uiju, and Jeju. Which then in August 1901 expanded into six regiments totaling 18,000 soldiers.

=== Imperial Korean Navy ===
According to the Geunsejoseonjeonggam, the Late Joseon Dynasty, both the government and private entities owned a total of 143 steamships. In 1903, the government of the Korean Empire purchased its first modern ship, the Yangmu. The Yangmu, however, was not as efficient as it looked because of its previous use as a cargo ship. For the reasons above, the government ordered the construction of a more efficient ship, the Gwangje. The annexation of Korea by the Empire of Japan, however, disrupted Korean naval tradition from 1910 until 1945.

== Policies ==
=== Retirement ===
Imperial Korean Army had a retiring age. Colonel-General did not have a retiring age, Lieutenant General should retire at 70, and Major General should retire at 65. Senior Officers should retire at the age of 54, Captain should retire at the age of 48, and First lieutenant, Second lieutenant, and Non-commissioned officer should retire at the age of 45. But these retiring age can lengthen.

From 1909, personnels after the retirement got pension. Lieutenant Generals got 480 Hwan, Major Generals got 420 Hwan, Colonels got 360 Hwan, Lieutenant Colonels got 300 Hwan, Majors got 240 Hwan, Captains got 180 Hwan, First Lieutenants got 144 Hwan, and Second Lieutenants got 120 Hwan. Personnels after the retirement should notify in order to get the pension. If the recipients of pension commits serious crime or lose the allegiance of Korea, pension was not given any more.

== Budget ==
The Korean Empire had used a lot of money as army budget. Army Budget of Korean Empire from 1895 to 1905:

Year	1895	1896	1897	1898	1899	1900	1901	1902	1903	1904	1905
Amount of Army Budget in Won	321,772	1,028,401	979,597	1,251,745	1,447,351	1,636,704	3,594,911	2,786,290	4,123,582	5,180,614	4,852,175

== Ranks ==
Ensigns of Regular Duty Uniform (1900–1907)
Insignia										
Korean	대원수 daewonsu	대장 daejang	부장 bujang	참장 chamjang	정령 jeonglyeong	부령 bulyeong	참령 chamlyeong	정위 jeong-wi	부위 buwi	참위 cham-wi
English	Generalisimo	General	Lieutenant general	Major general	Colonel	Lieutenant colonel	Major	Captain	First lieutenant	Second lieutenant

Ensigns of Regular Duty Uniform (1900–1907)
Insignia				
Korean	정교 jeong-gyo	부교 bugyo	참교 chamgyo	친위대/시위대/진위대 chin-widae/siwidae/jin-widae
English	Master sergeant	Sergeant first class	Staff sergeant	Royal bodyguards/City guards/Garrison guards

== Weapons ==
After signing the Treaty of Ganghwa, Japan, Qing, the United States, and the European nations started importing modern weapons such as rifles, artillery, and machine guns in 1883 until its annexation in 1910. From 1887, Gojong even tried to locally manufacture weapons, which never succeeded.

=== Rifle ===
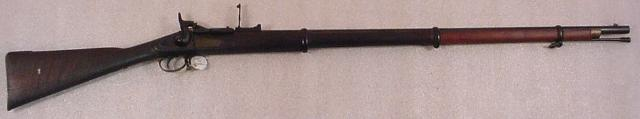
Snyder Enfield rifle. Acquired from Great Britain in (1881-1884)

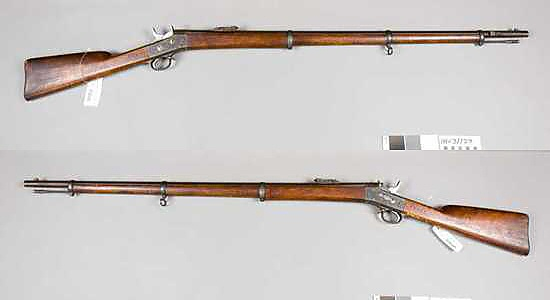
Remington Rolling Block rifle. Acquired from the United States in (1884-1895)

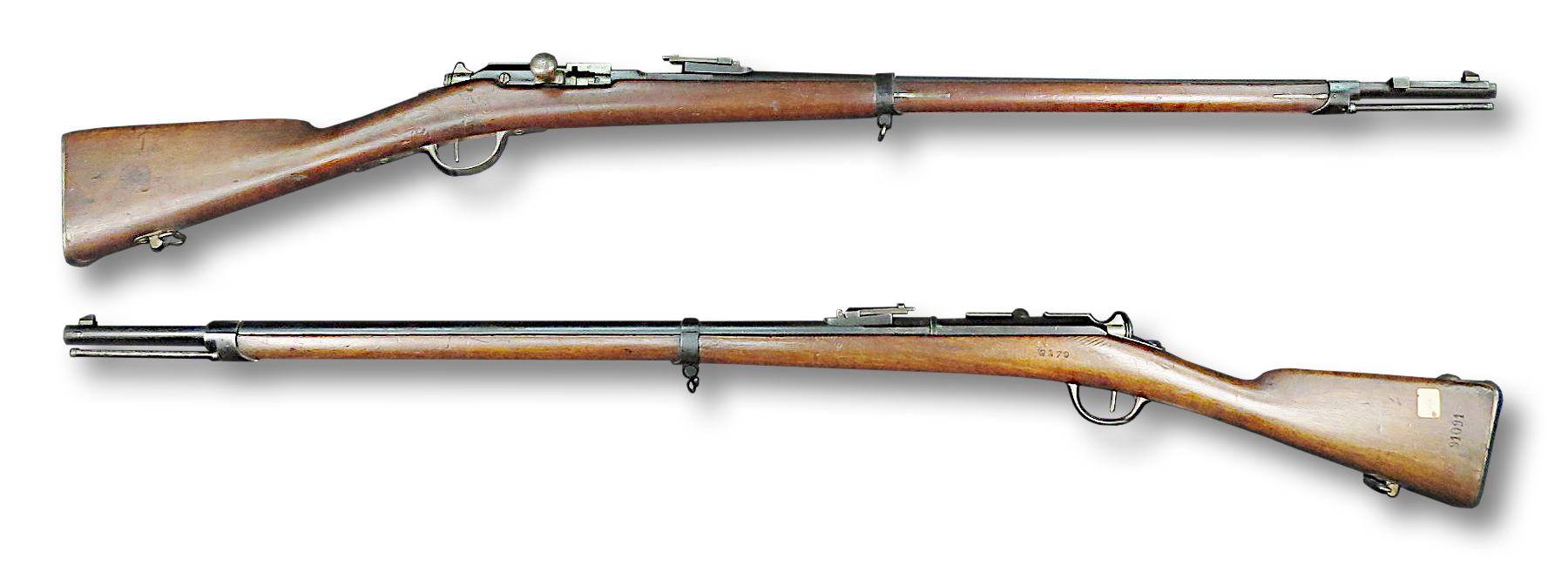
Fusil Gras M80 1874. Acquired from France.

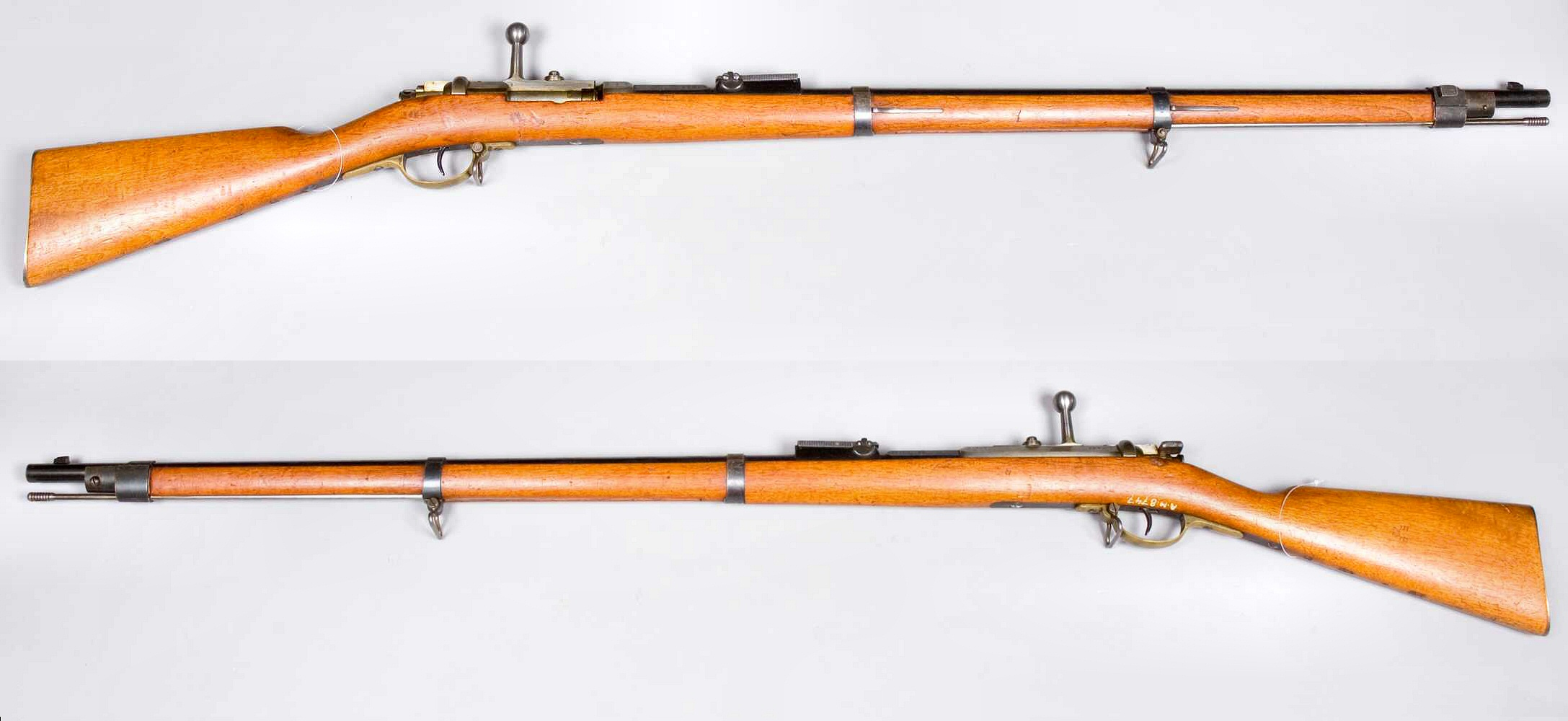
Mauser Model 1871. Acquired from the German Empire in (1893~). It was the standard-issue rifle of the Imperial Korean Armed Forces.

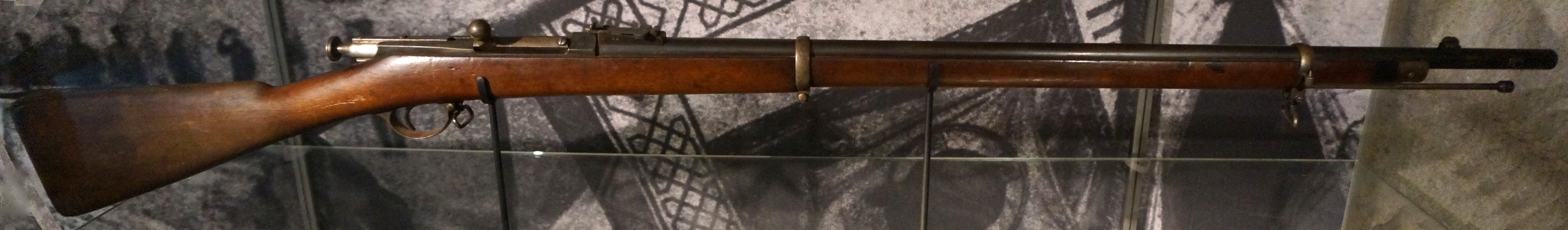
Berdan rifle. Acquired from the Russian Empire in (1896~). It's a standard issue for the Imperial Guard, but they're not as reliable as the Mauser Model 1871.

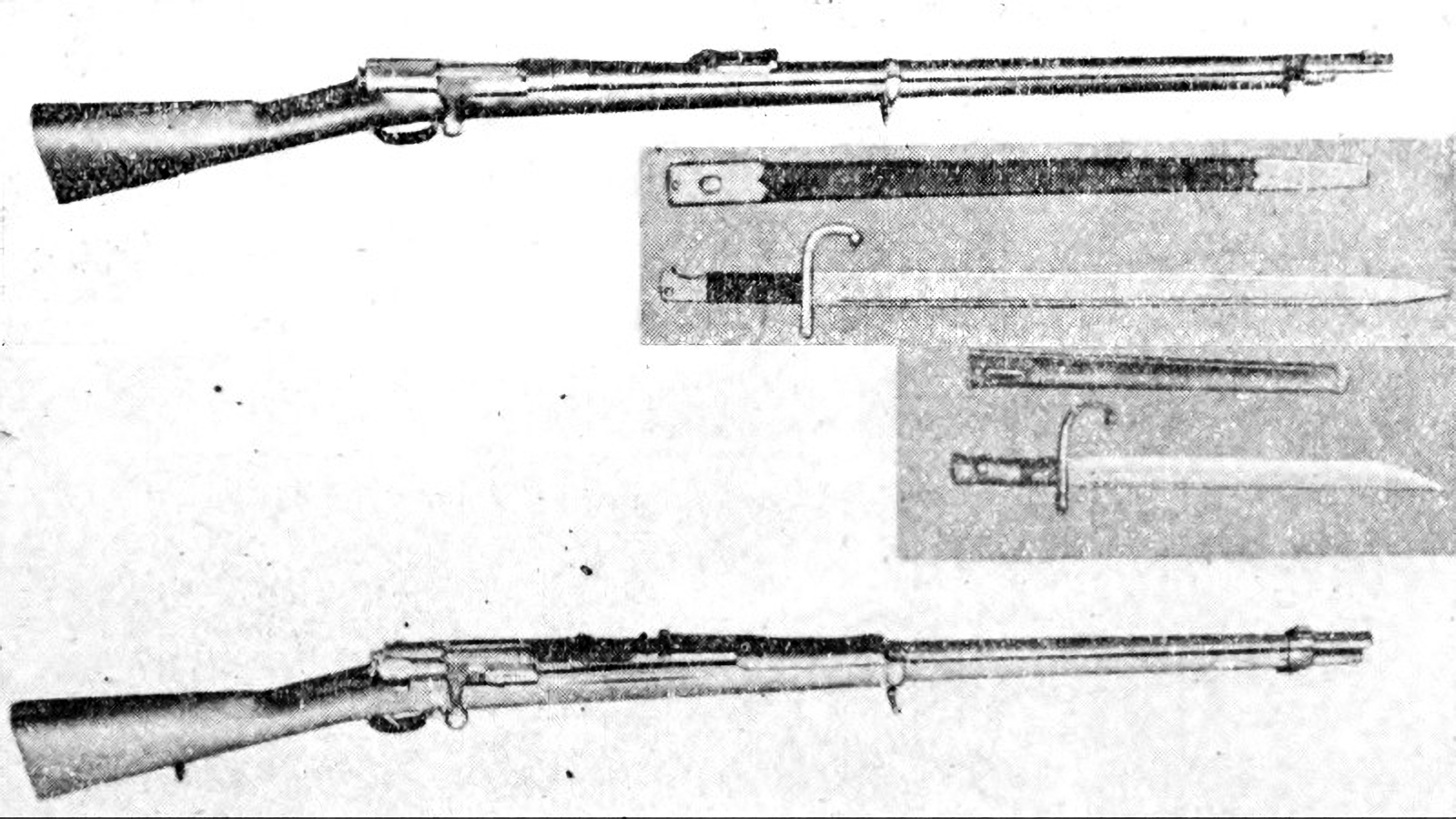
Murata Type 13 rifle (top) with Murata Type 22 carbine (bottom). Acquired from the Japanese Empire in (1880s~).

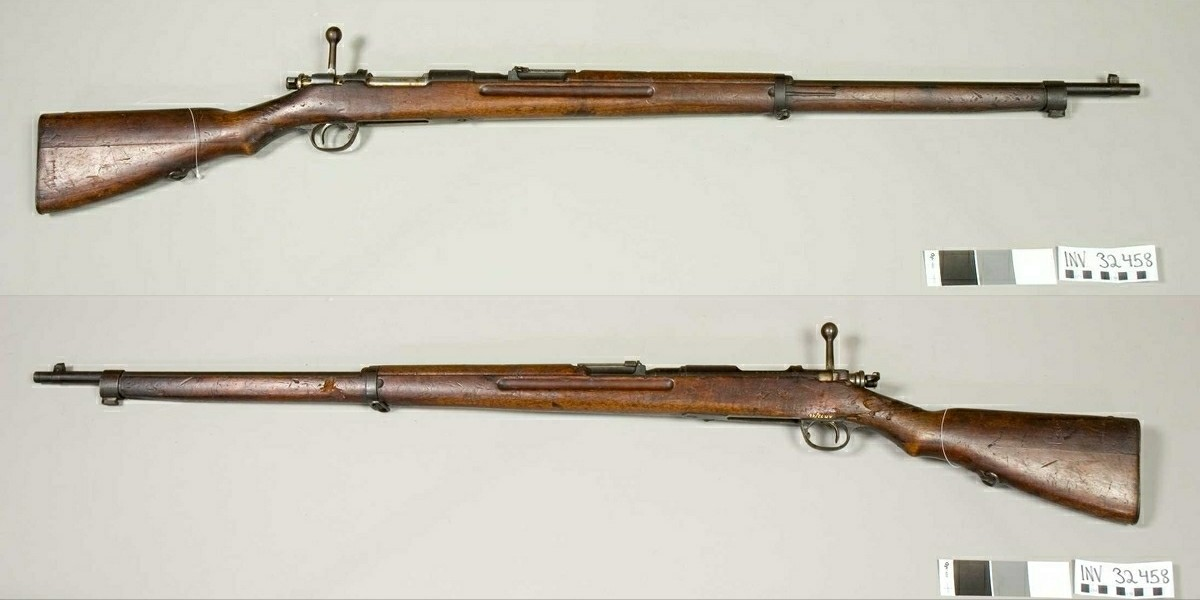
Type 30 rifle. They were acquired from the Japanese Empire in (1900~) and made licensed copies in Yongsan Military Factory.

=== Pistol ===
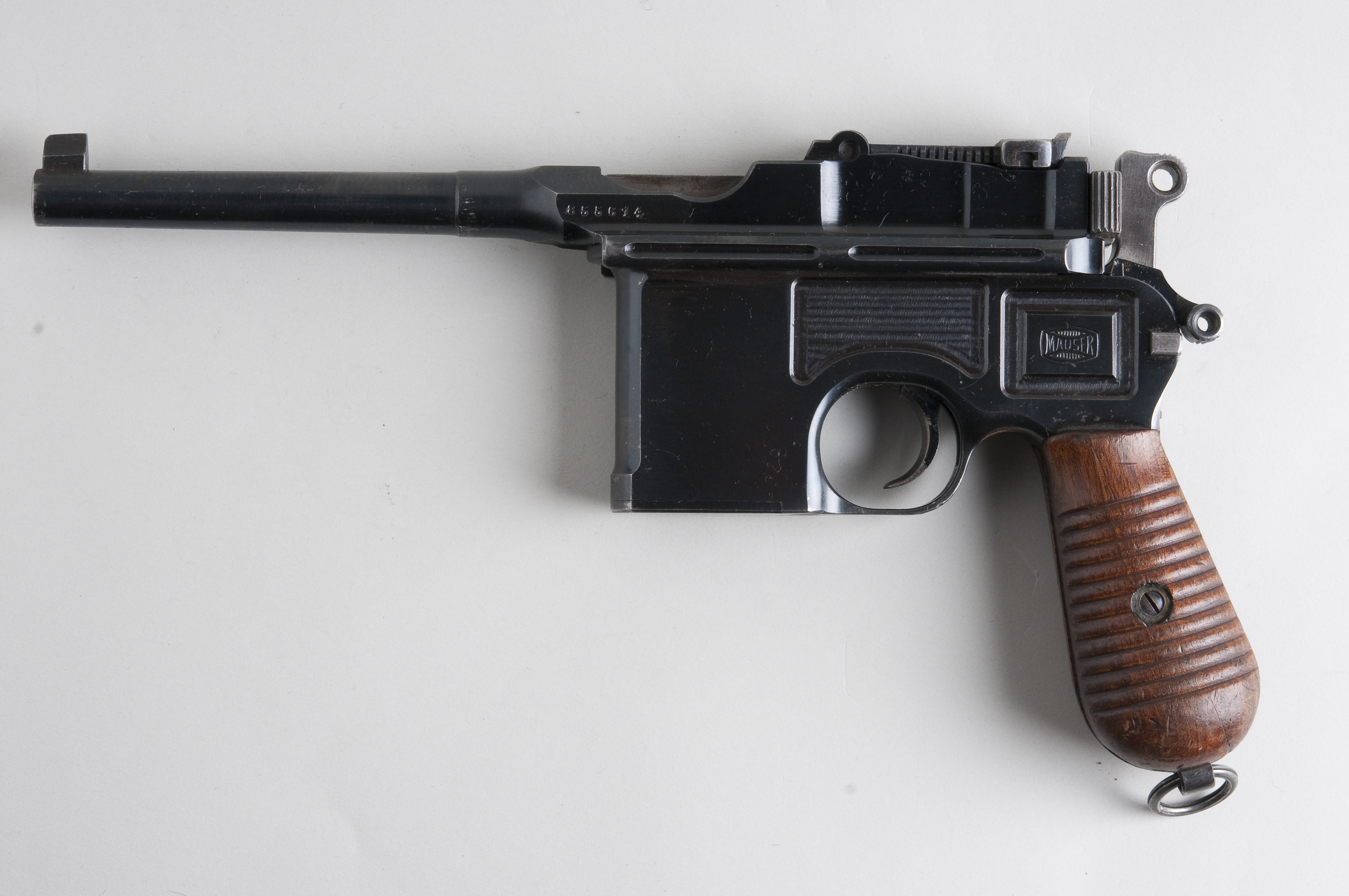
Mauser C96 "Broomhandle" pistol. Acquired from the German Empire.

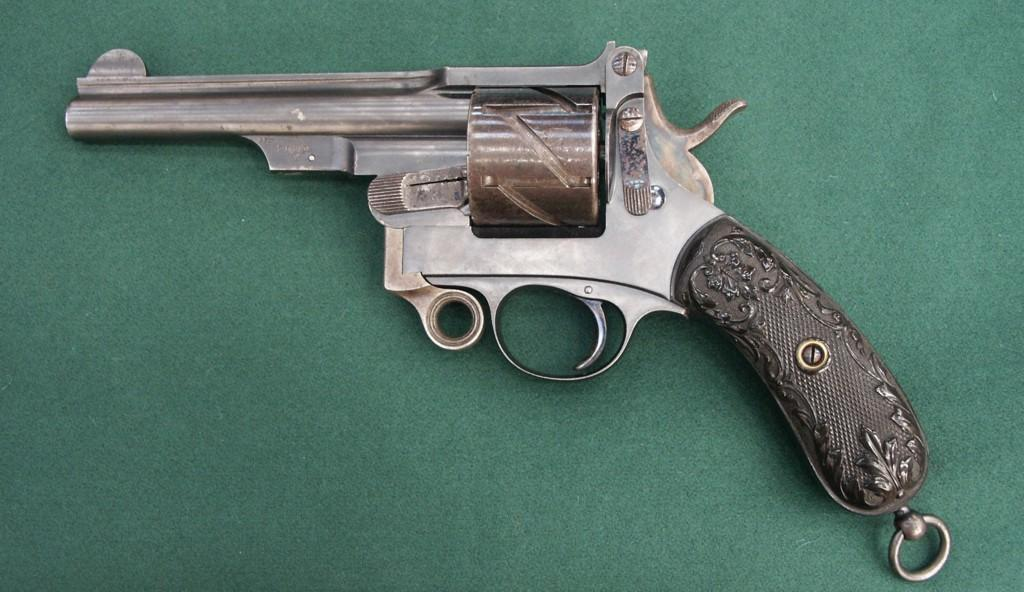
Mauser zig zag 11mm revolver. Acquired from the German Empire.

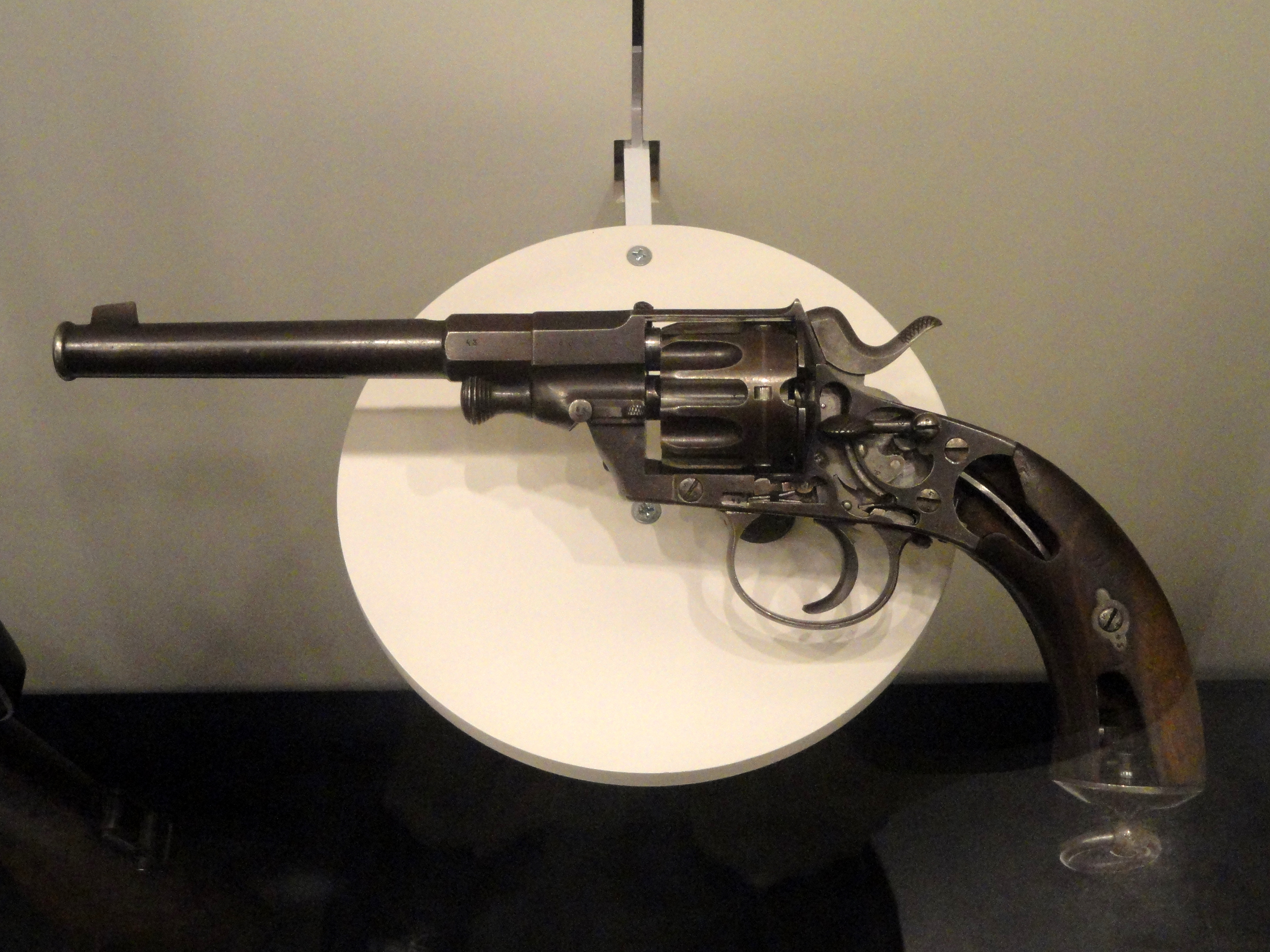
Model 1879 Revolver. Acquired from the German Empire.

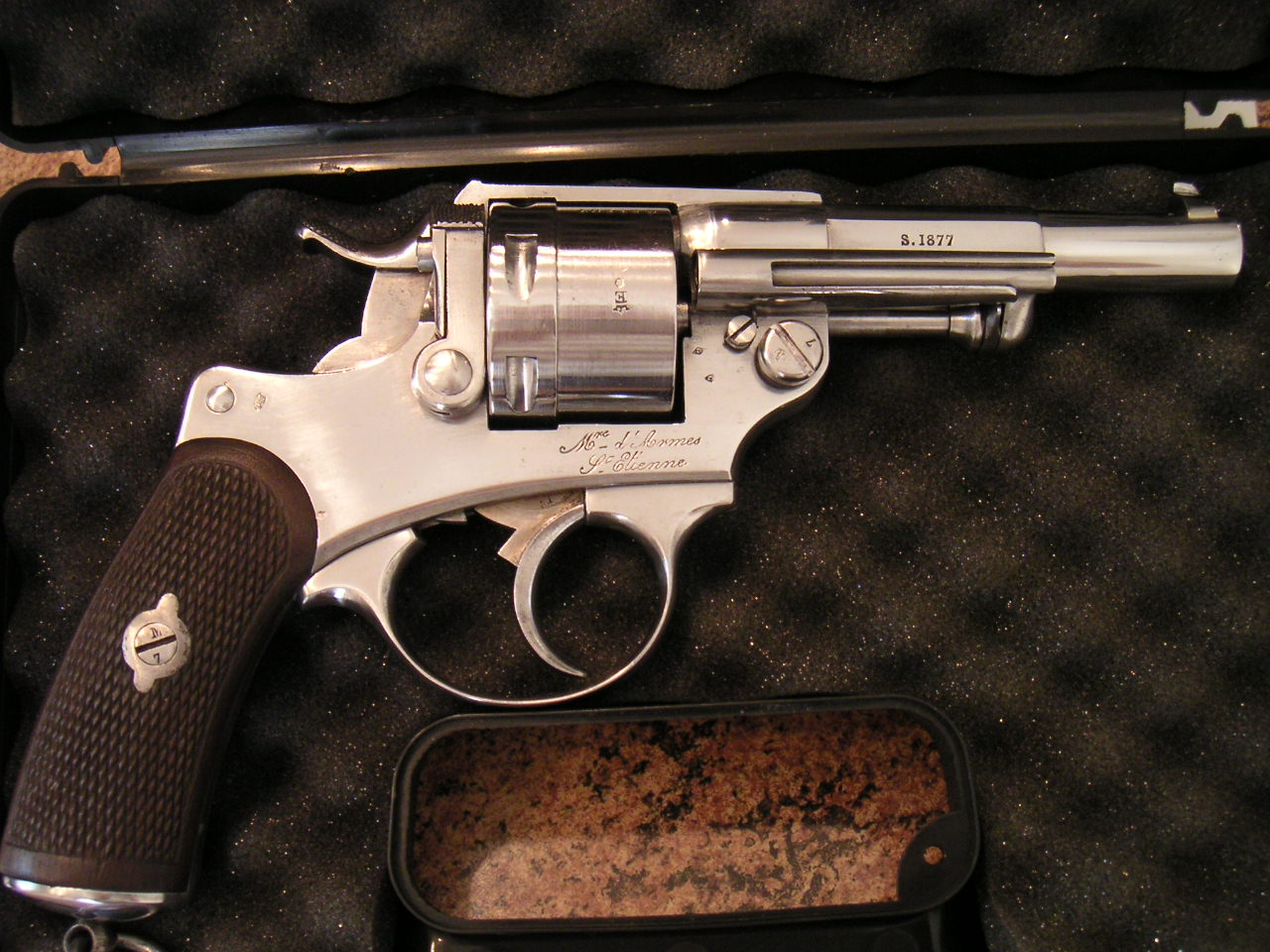
Revolver modèle 1873. Acquired from France.

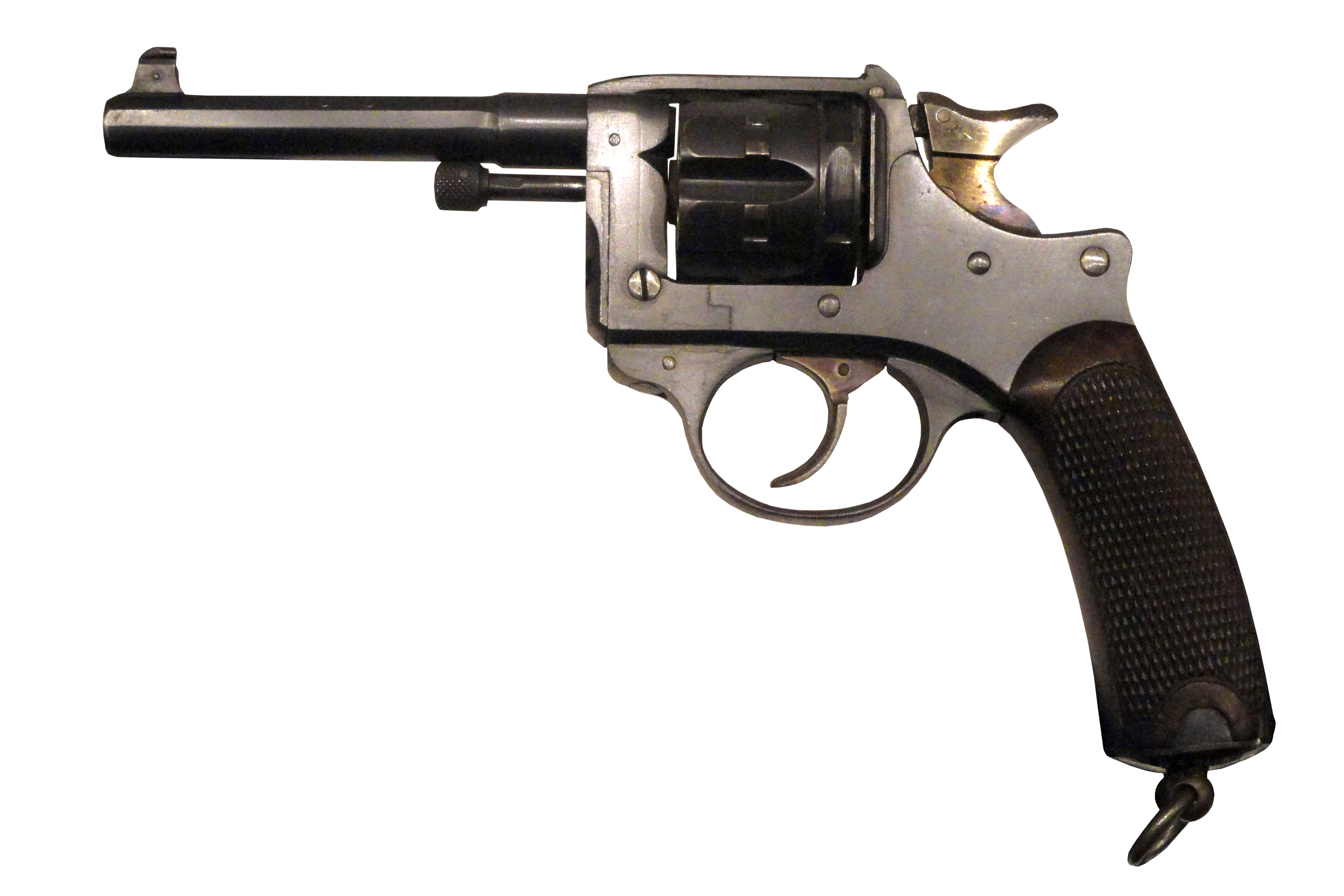
France service revolver, Model 1892, 8 mm. Acquired from France.

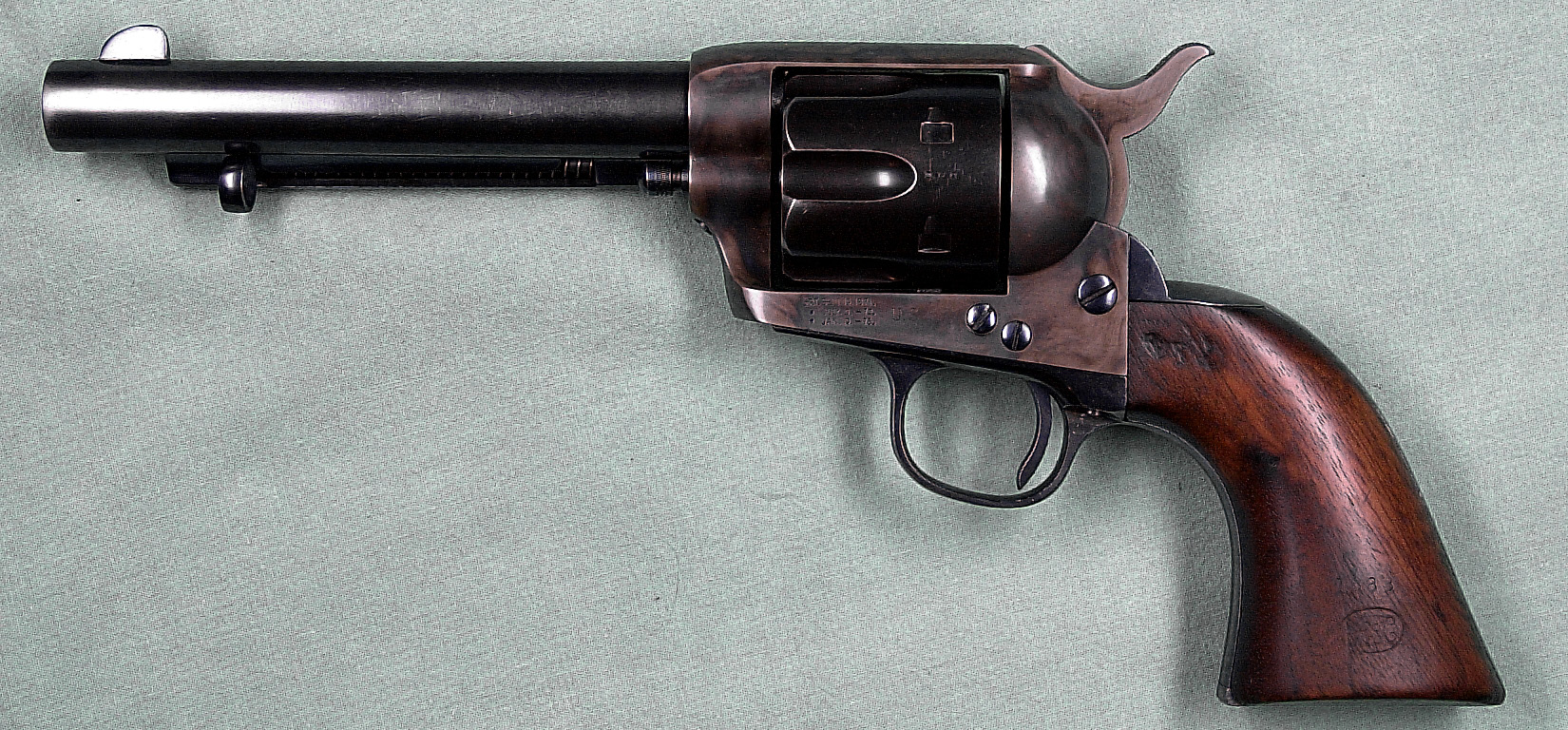
Colt M1873 Single Action Army revolver. Acquired from the United States. Particularly use by the royal guards.

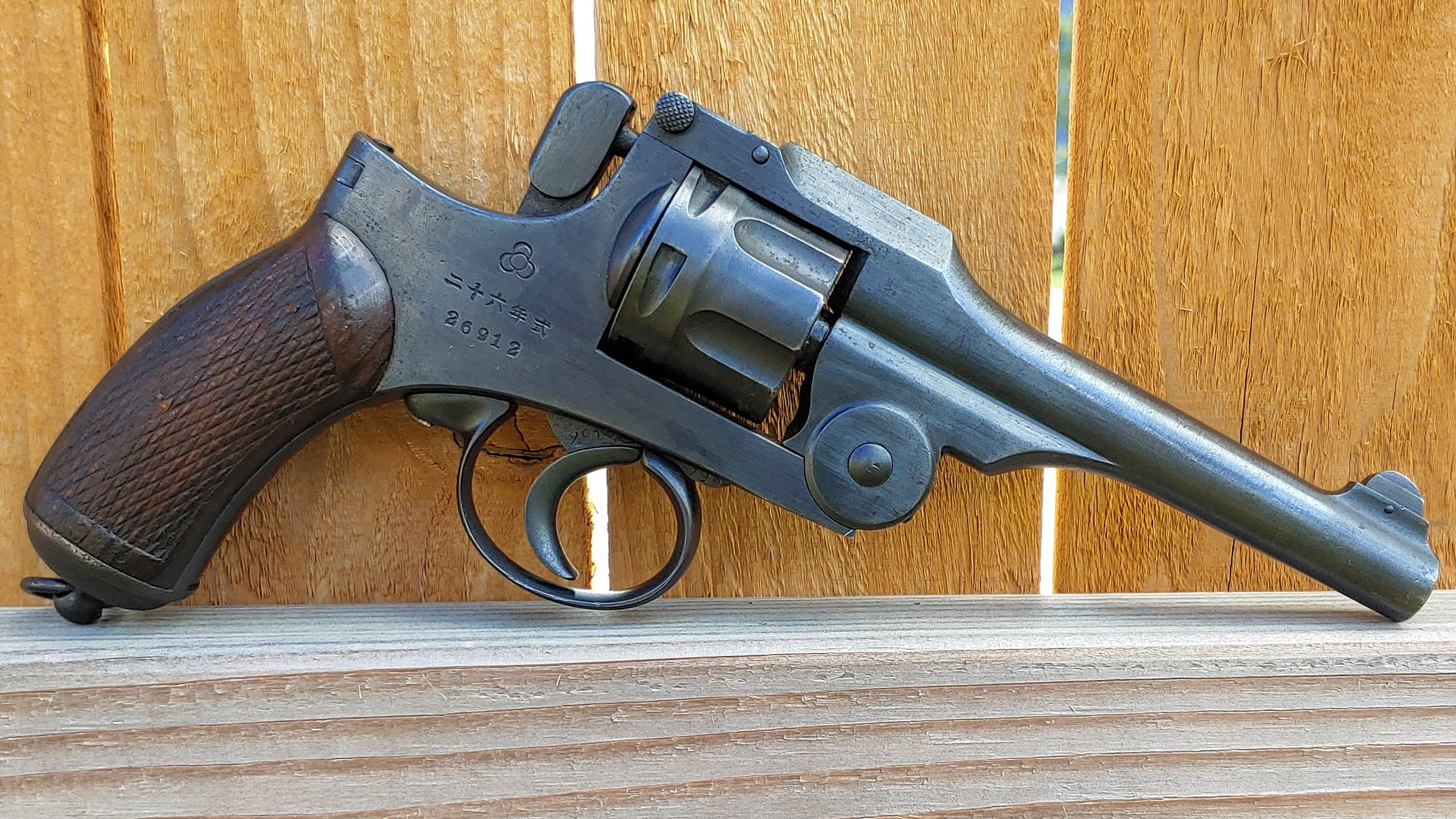
Type 26 Revolver. Acquired from Japan.

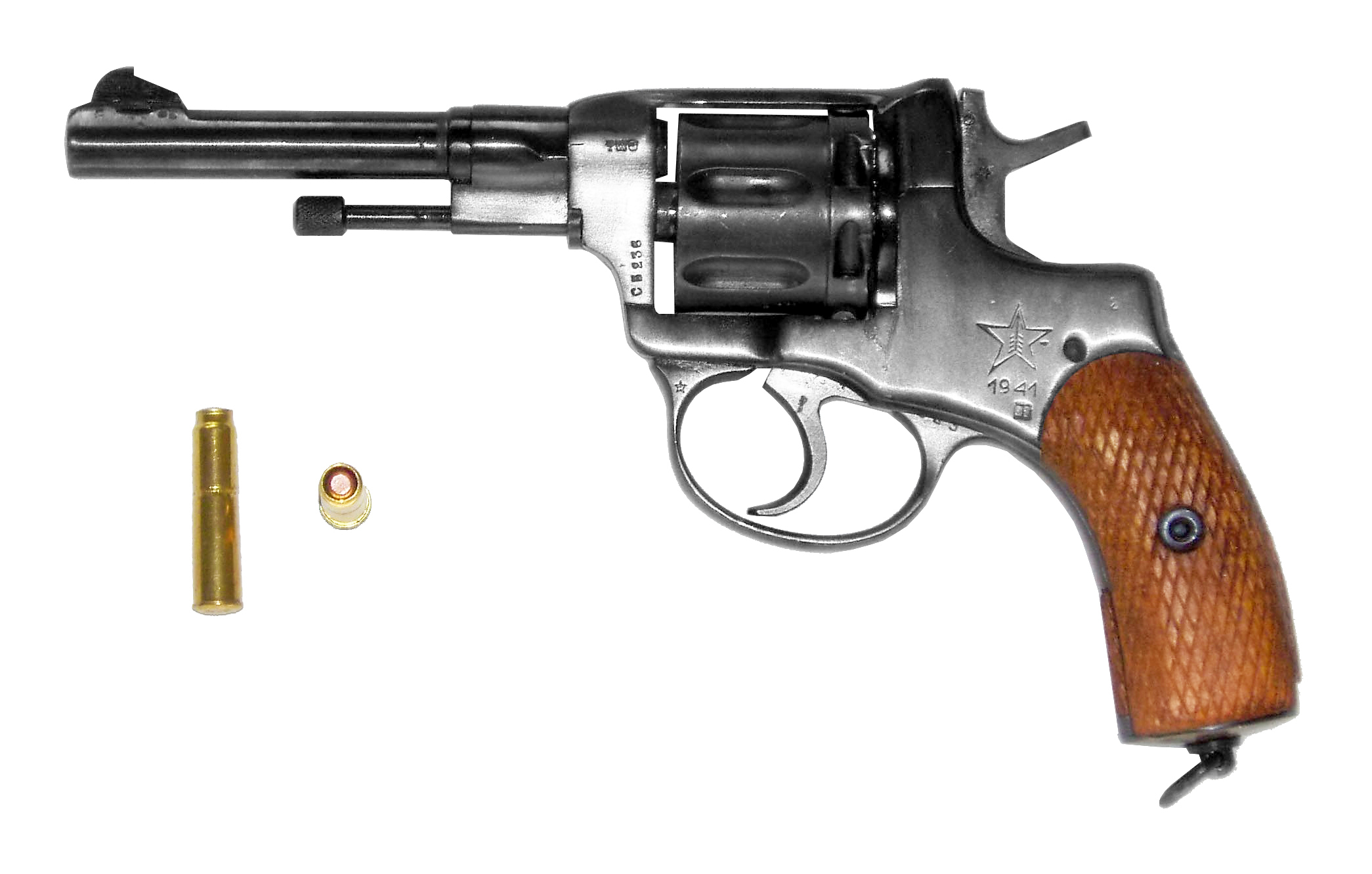
Nagant M1895 revolver. Acquired from the Russian Empire. Used by Korean military and police forces.

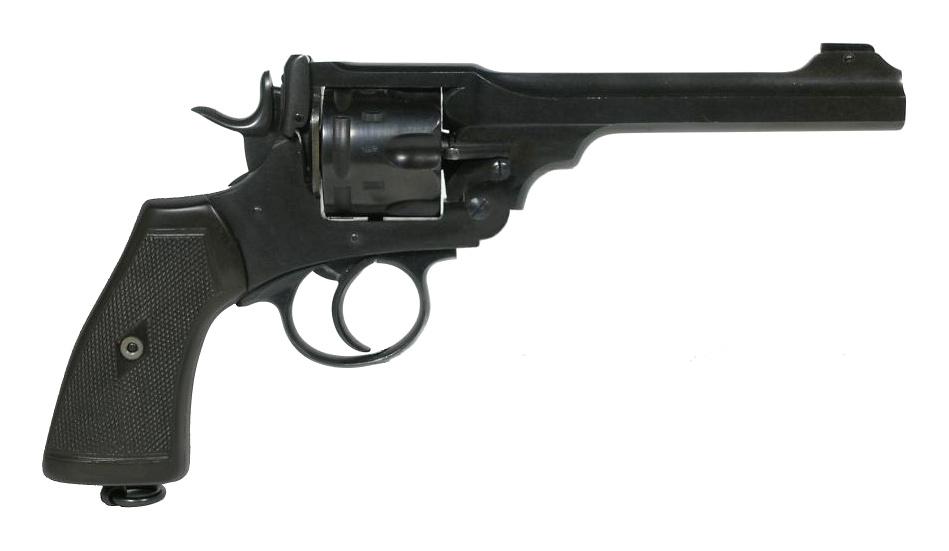
Webley revolver. Acquired from the United Kingdom. Particularly by the royal guards.

=== Artillery ===
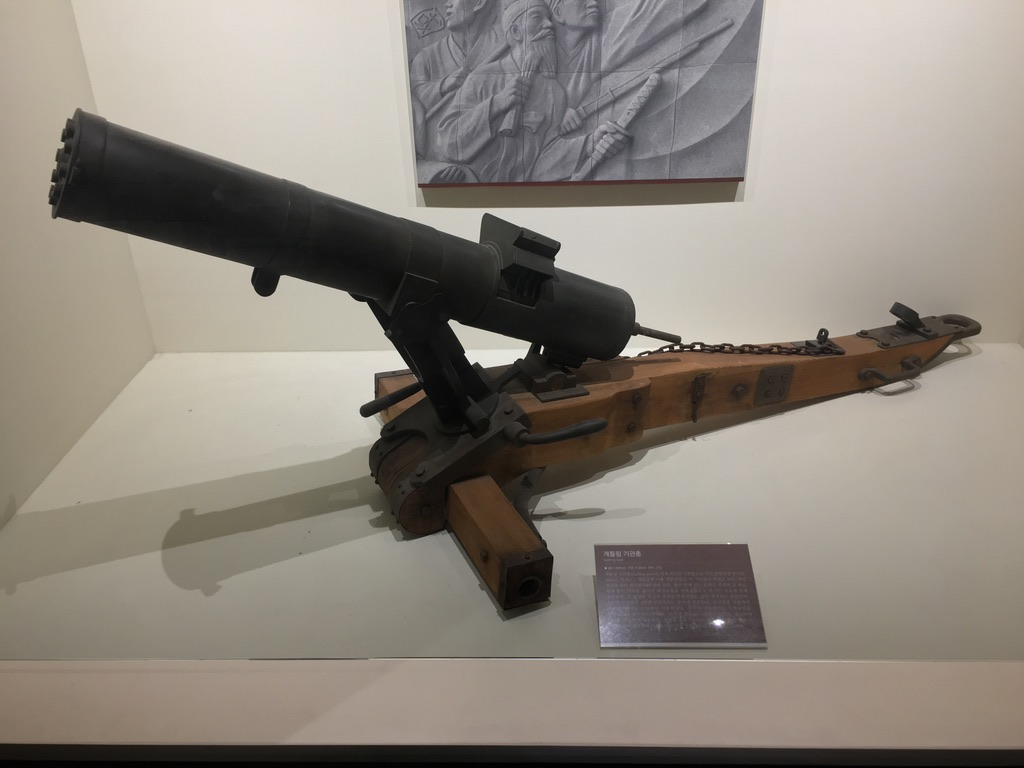
Gatling Gun. They were used during the Donghak Peasant Revolution and acquired from the United States (1883~).

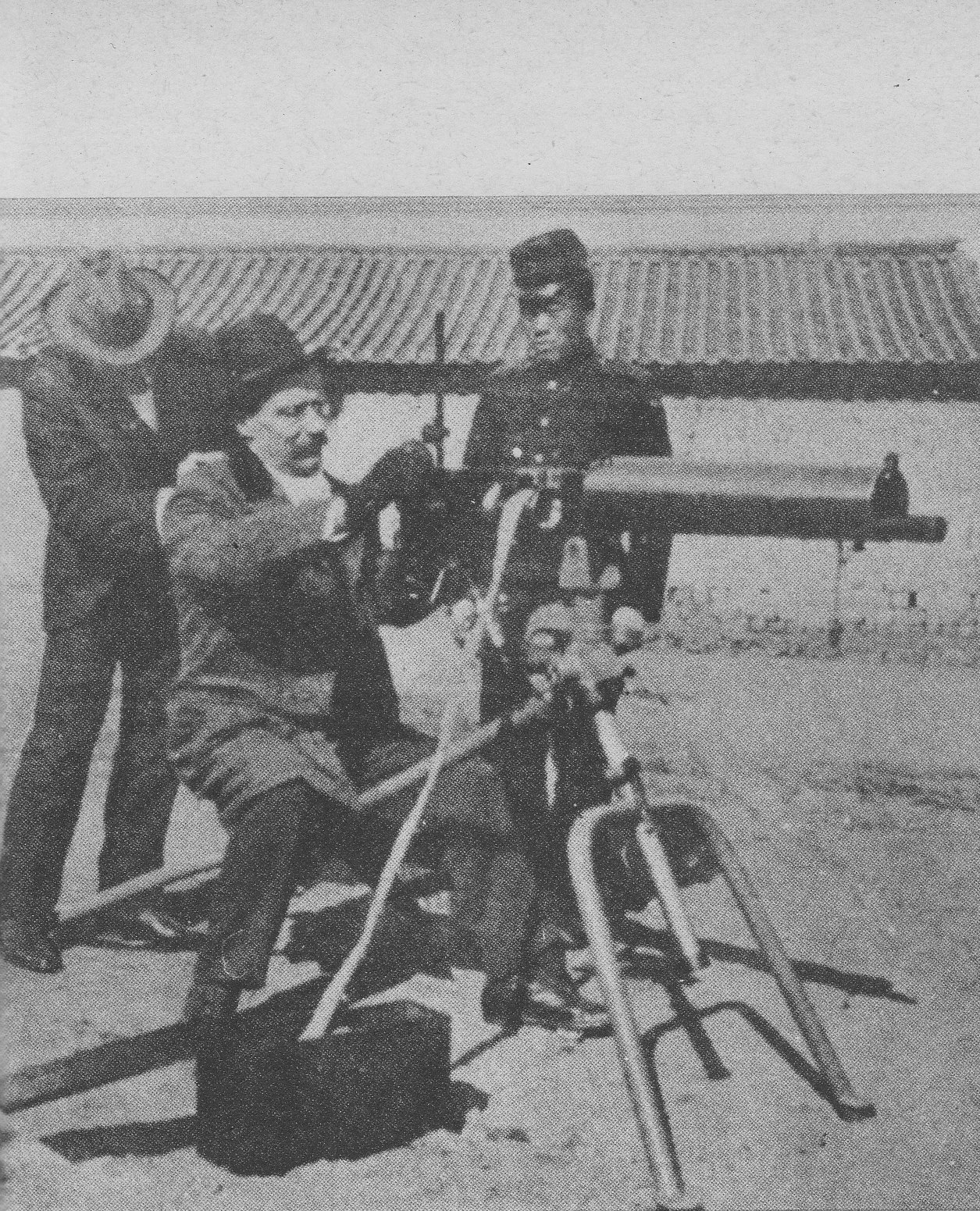
A foreign instructor demonstrating a Maxim machine gun to a Korean soldier. Acquired from Great Britain in (Unknown).

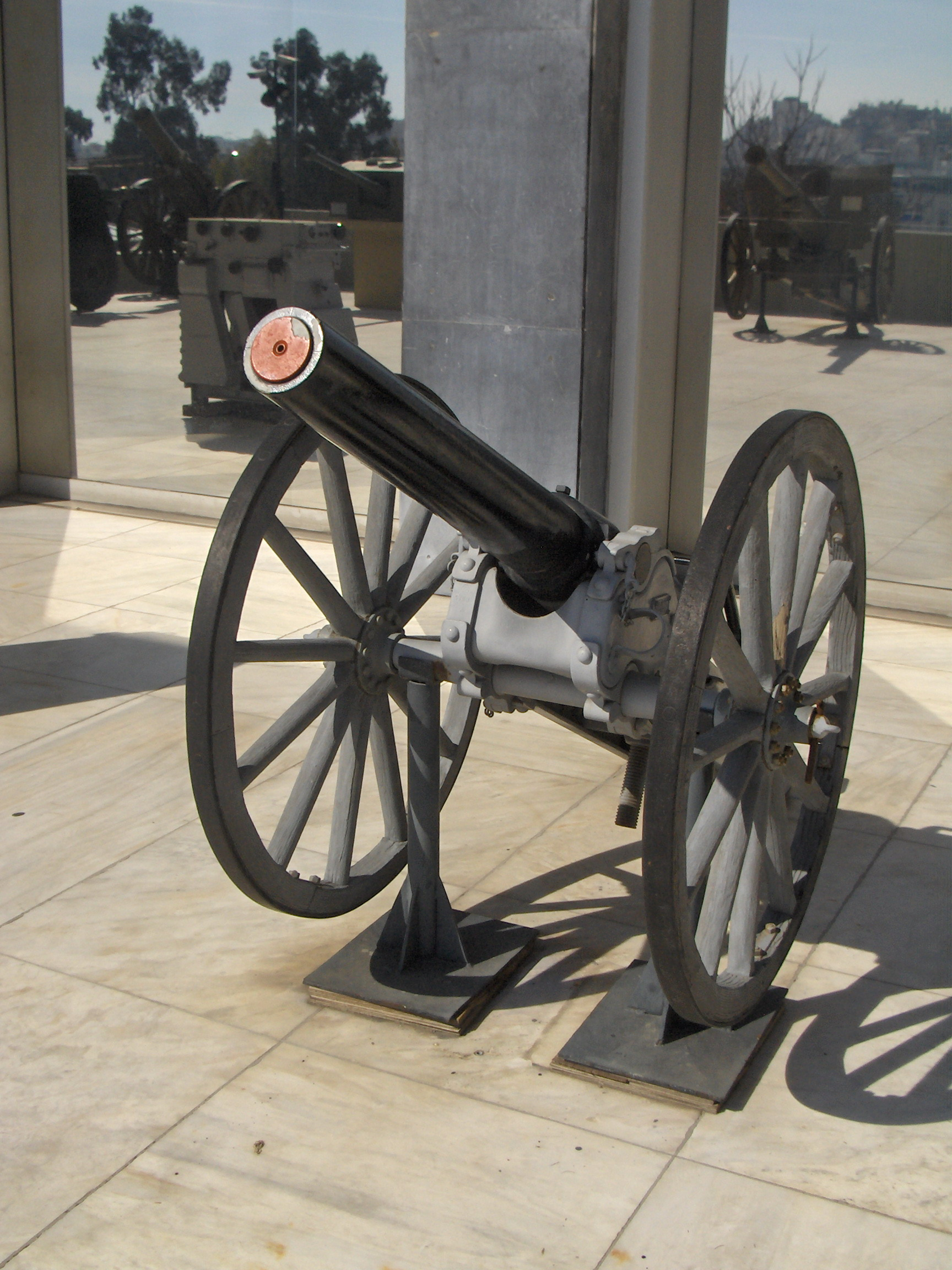
Krupp 75mm mountain gun. Acquired from the German Empire in (Unknown).

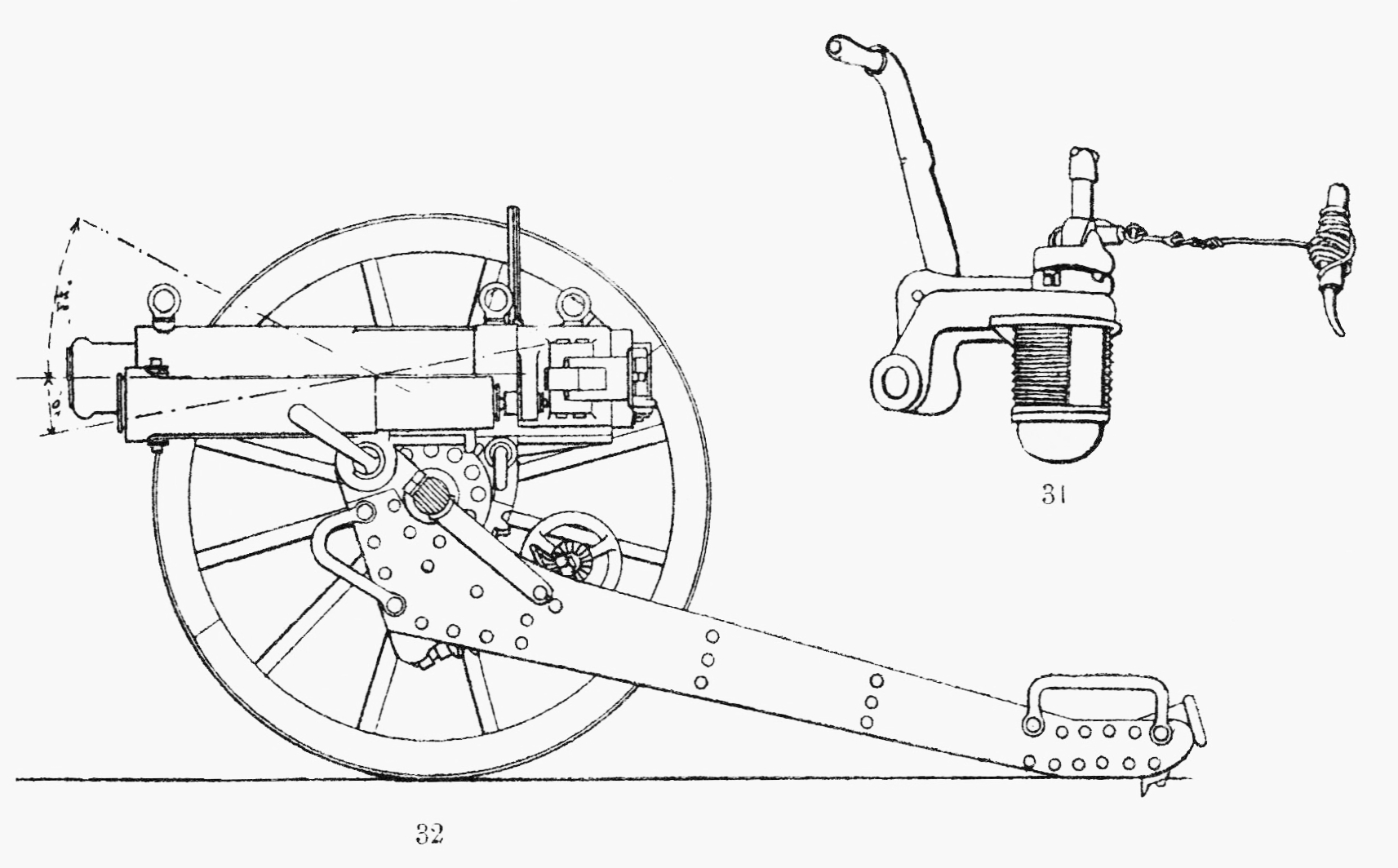
QF 2.95 inch Vickers-Maxim mountain gun. Acquired from Great Britain.

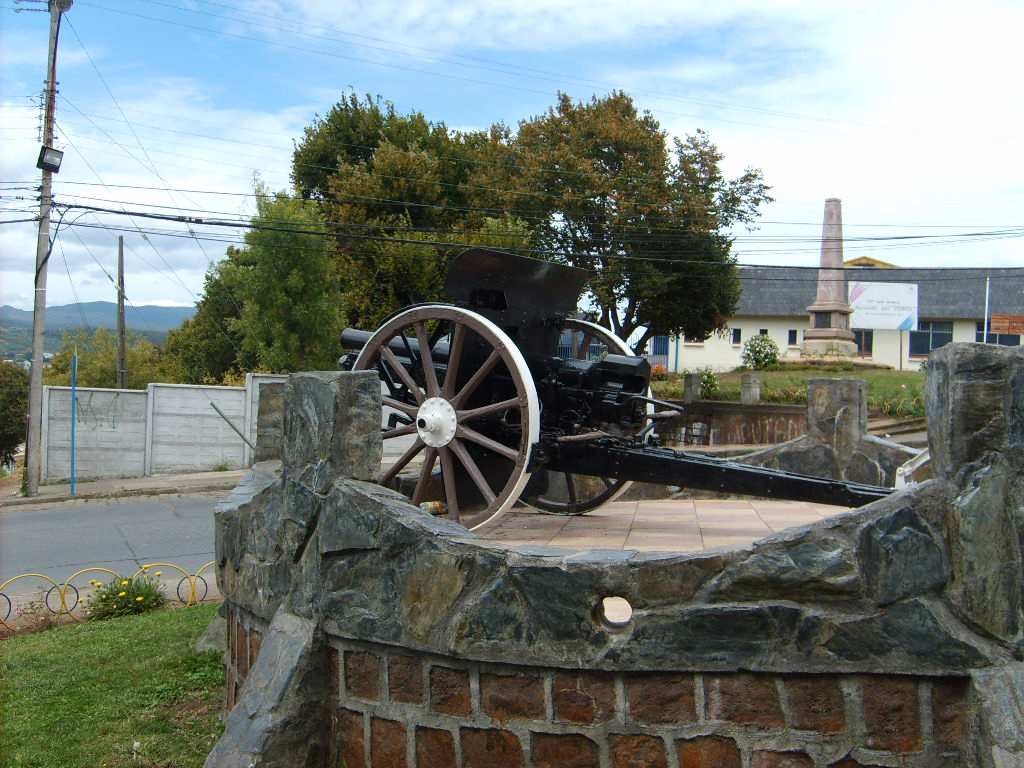
Krupp 75mm field gun. Acquired from the German Empire in (Unknown).

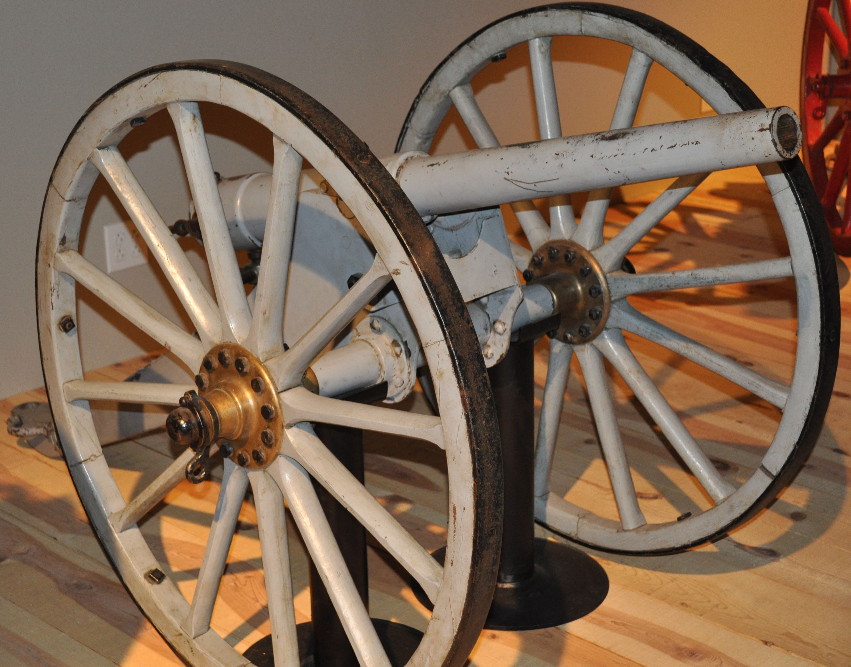
Hotchkiss 57mm mountain gun. Acquired from the United States.

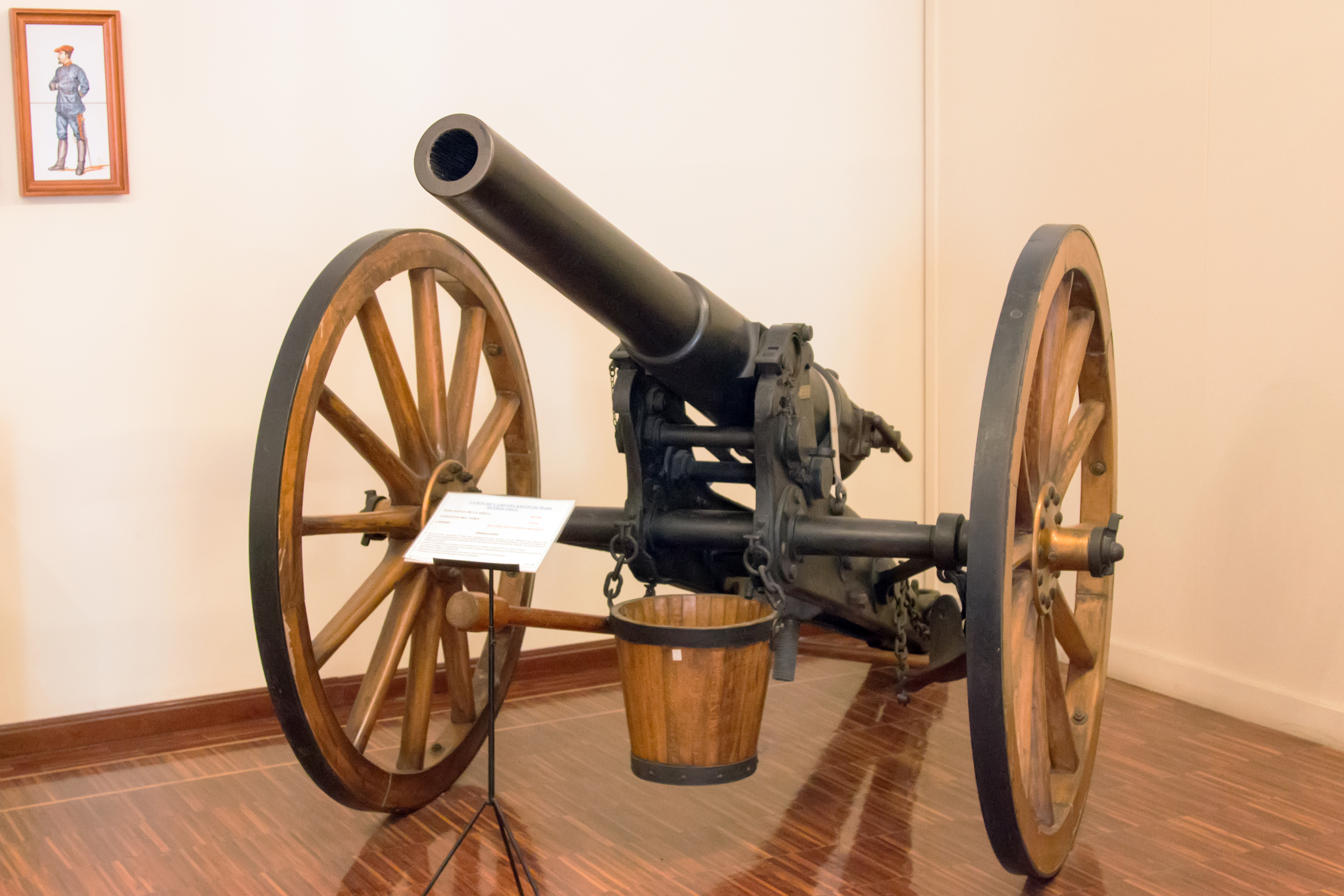
9 cm Kanone C/73. Acquired from the German Empire in (Unknown).

=== Melee ===
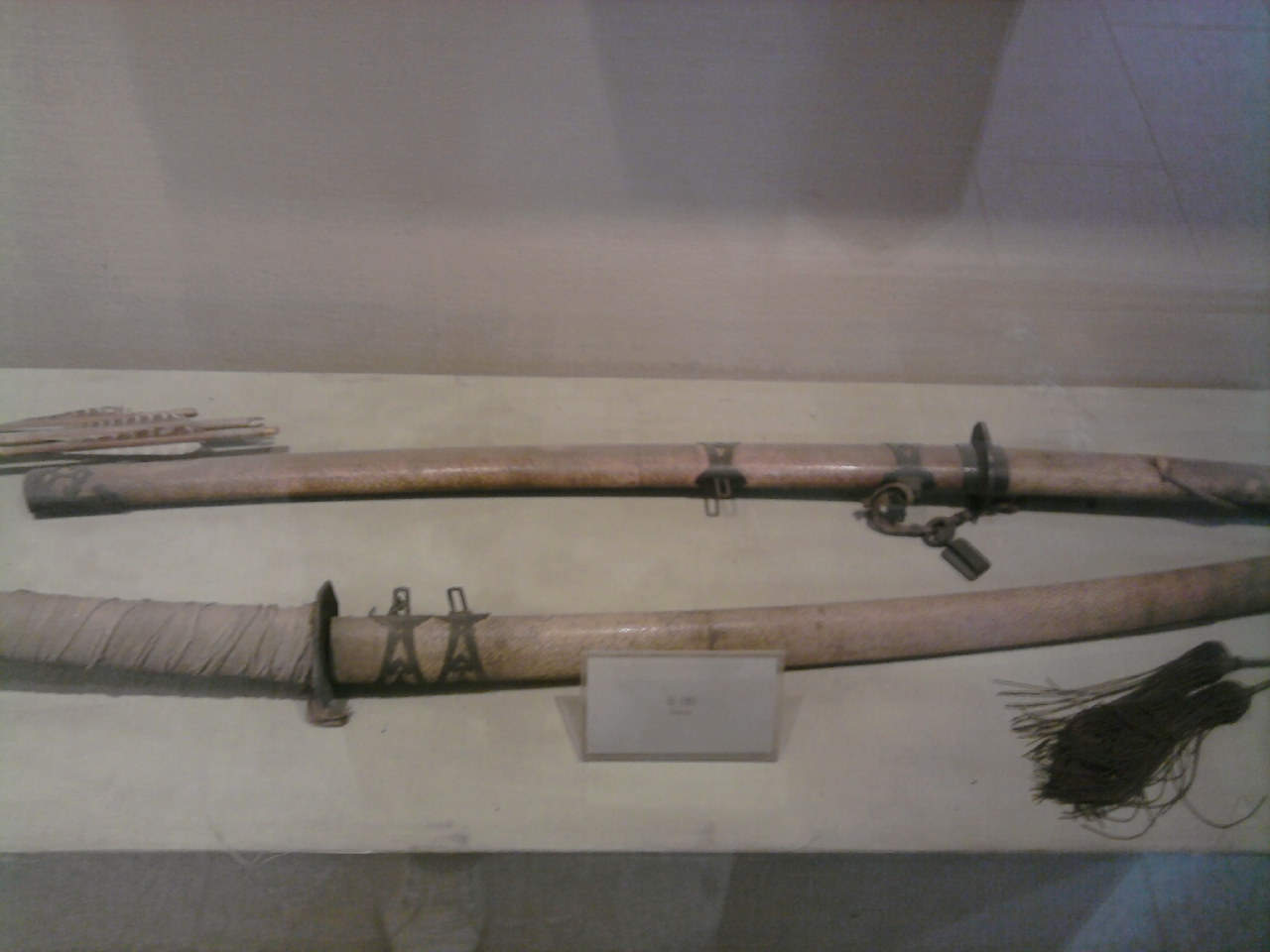
Hwando, standard sword of the Military of the Korean Empire.

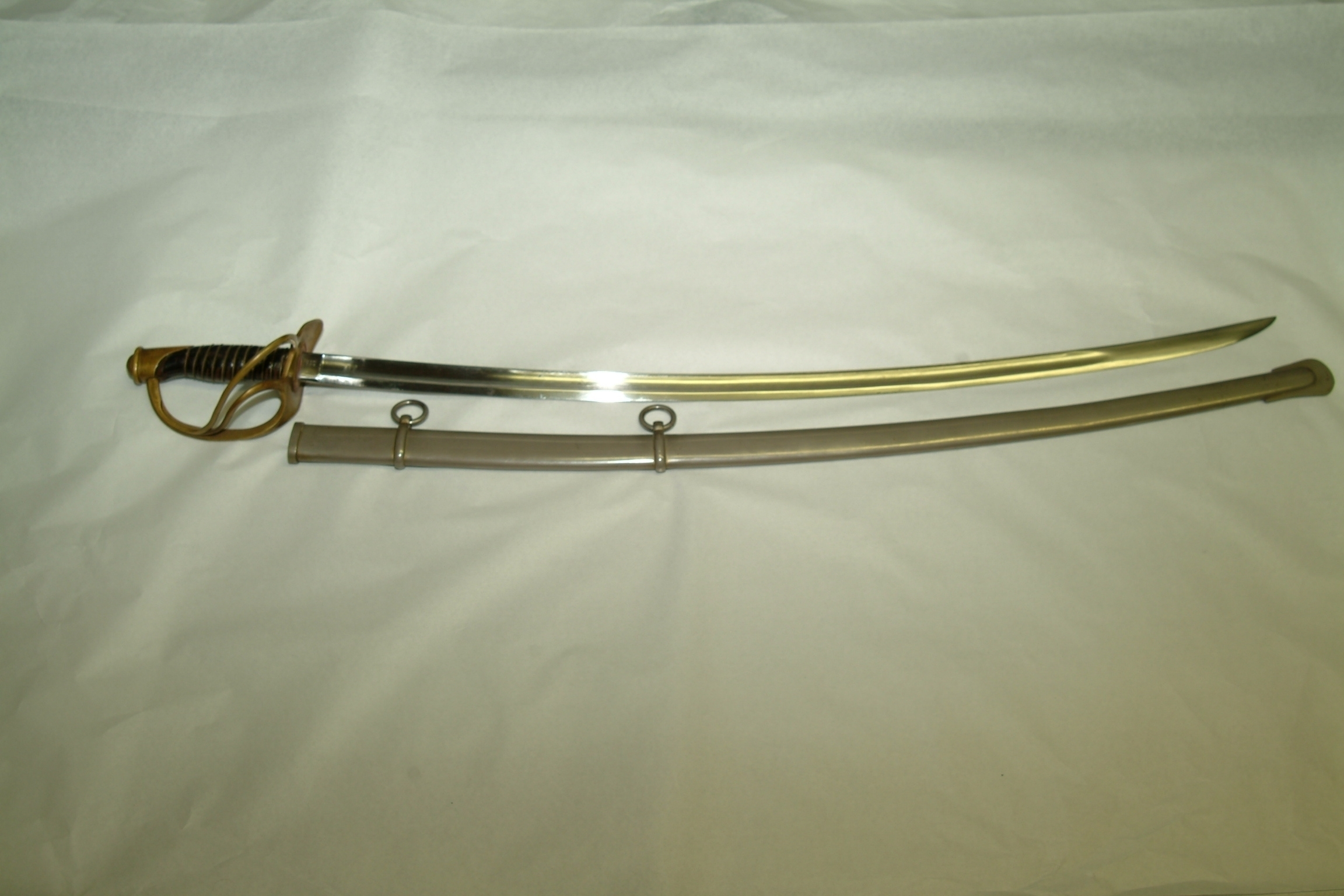
M1860 cavalry saber. Acquired from the United States (late 19th and early 20th centuries)

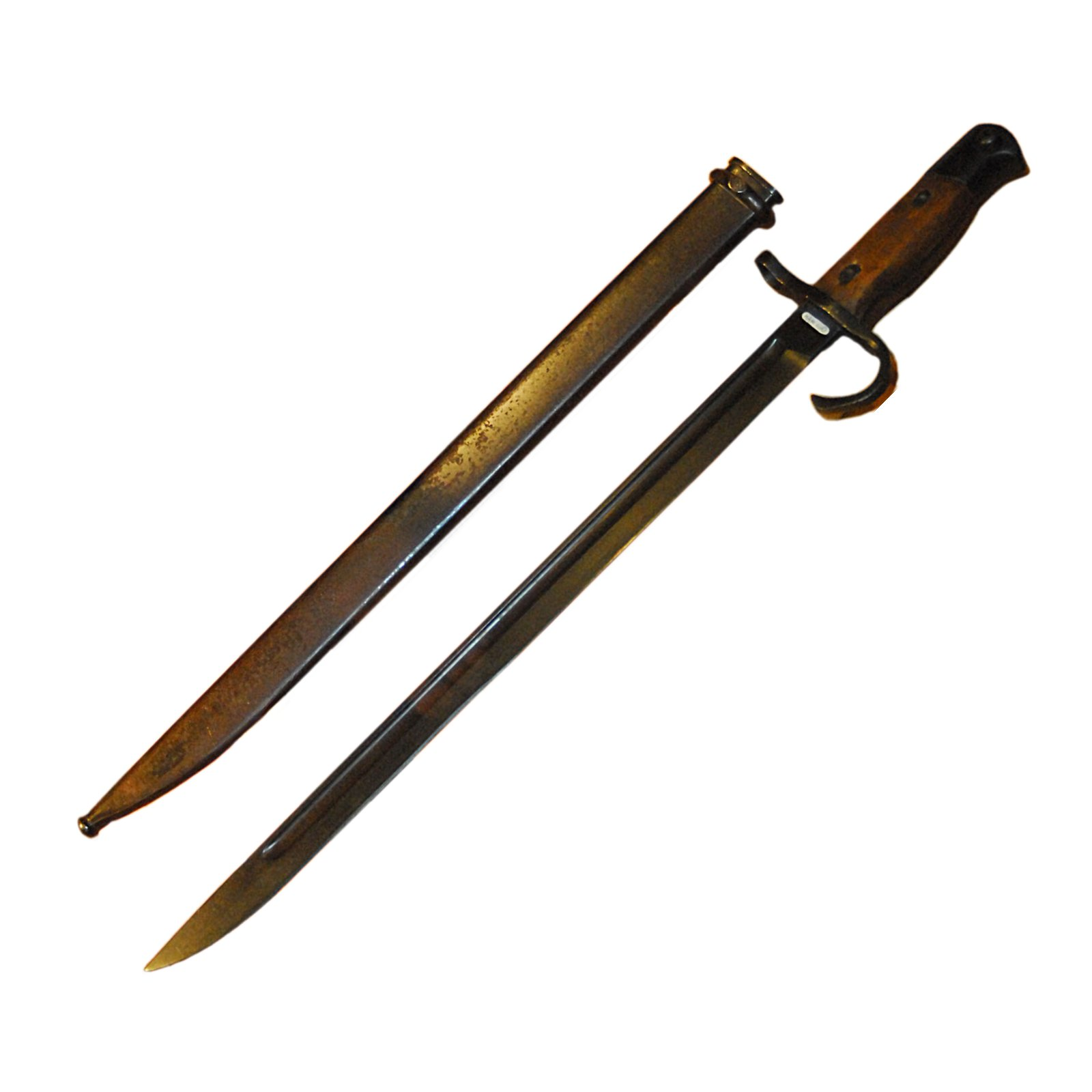
Type 30 bayonet. Acquired from the Japanese Empire (1897).

== Ships ==
Lighthouse Tender

Name (Revised Romanization)	Hangul	Type	Construction	Specifications
Yangmu	양무호	Lighthouse Tender	1881, Britain: Sir Raylton Dixon & Co	Displacement: 1,200 tons, Length: 65 meters, Armament: 6 x 4.7-inch guns, 2 x 3-pounder guns.

Gunboat

Name (Revised Romanization)	Hangul	Type	Construction	Specifications
Guangjae	광제호	Gunboat	1904, Japan: Kawasaki Shipbuilding Corporation	Displacement: 1,056 long tons (1,073 t) (normal load), Length 66.67 m (218.7 ft), Armament 3 × 1 3 inch naval guns

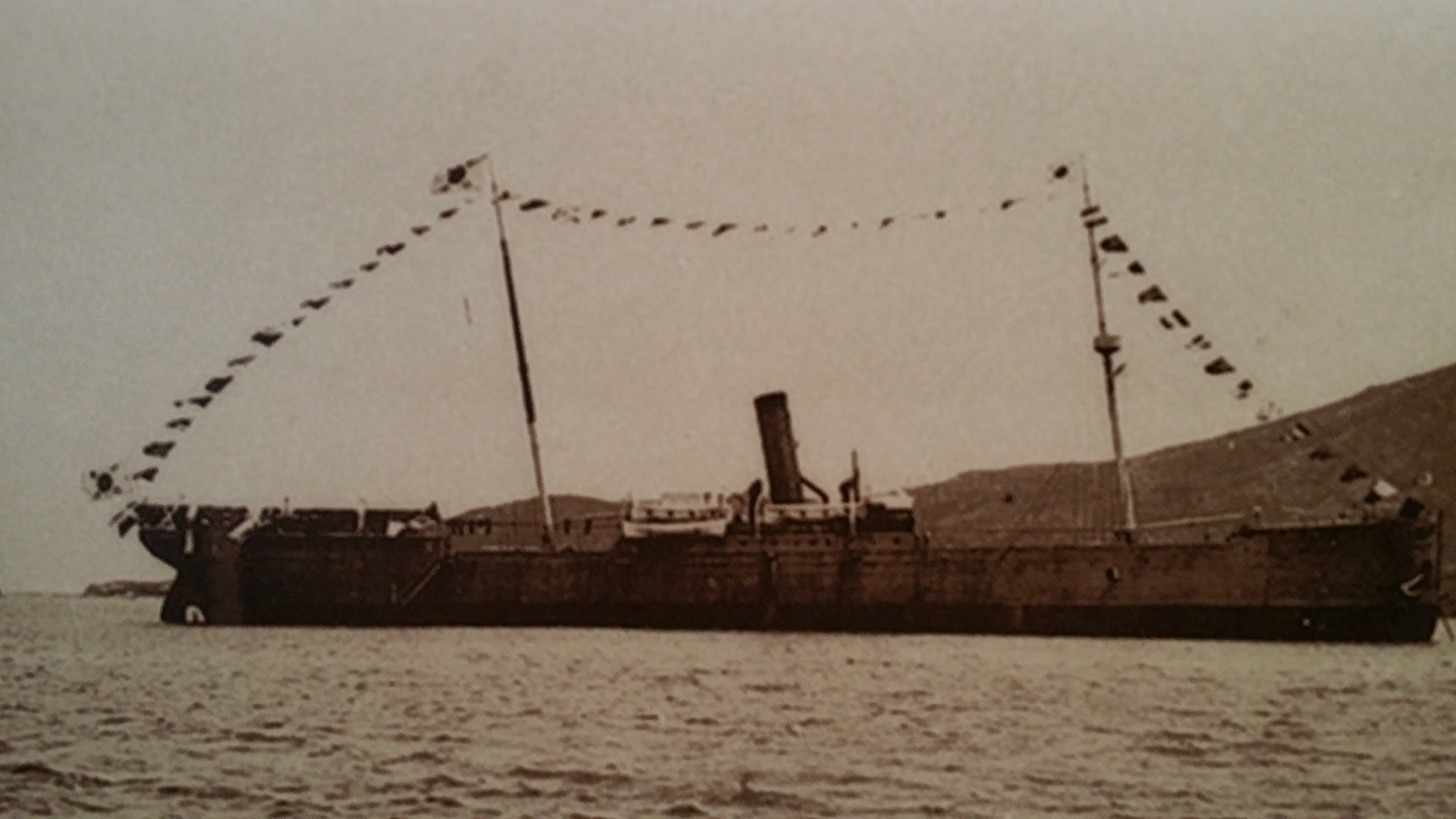
KIS Yangmu

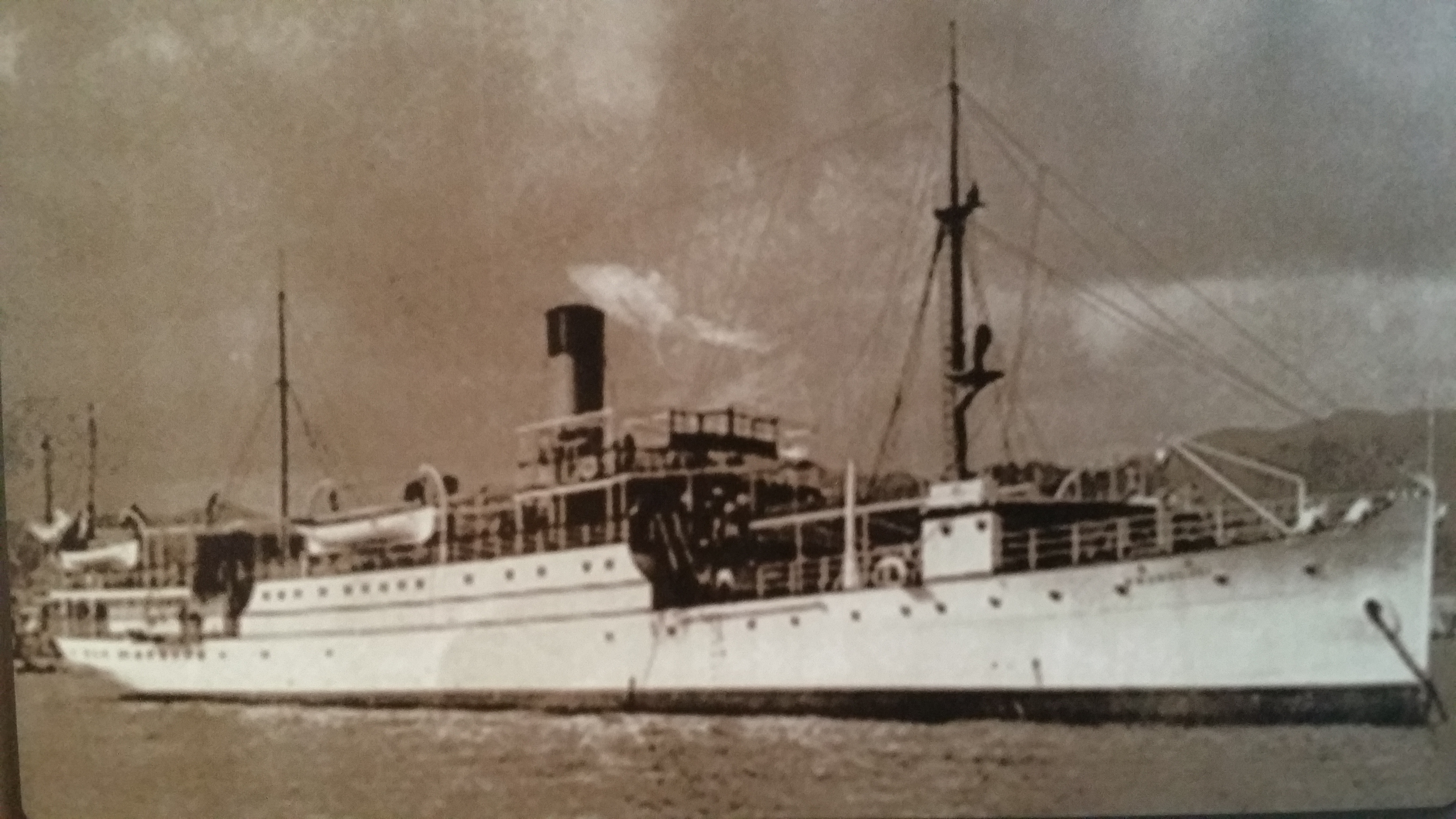
KIS Guangjae

== See also ==
- Korean Empire
- Joseon Army (late 19th century)
- Joseon Infantry Division
- Gwangmu Reform

== Bibliography ==
- Cho, Phil-gun (2021). "대한제국군과 육군무관학교의 민족군사(民族軍史)적 의의". 한국군사학논총. 10 (2): 49–74 – via KCI.
- Keltie, J.S., ed. (1900). The Statesman's Year Book: Statistical and Historical Annual of the States of the World for the Year 1900. New York: MacMillan.
- Kim, Won-Mo (2002). "한국의 영국 축하사절단 파견과 한·영 외교관계". The Oriental Studies (32): 87–126 – via KCI.
- Lee, Seongjin (2009). 구한말의 호위제도 고찰 (in Korean). 한국경호경비학회지.
- Imperial Korean Ministry of Military (1906a). Military Manual for Infantry (PDF) (in Korean).
- Imperial Korean Ministry of Military (1906b). Military Manual for Tactic (Part 1) (PDF) (in Korean).
- Imperial Korean Ministry of Military (1906c). Military Manual for Tactic (Part 2) (PDF) (in Korean).
- Hulbert, Homer (1904). The Korea Review.
- Institute for Military History (2005). 한말 군 근대화 연구.
- Kim, Won-Mo (2002). "한국의 영국 축하사절단 파견과 한·영 외교관계". The Oriental Studies (32): 87–126 – via KCI.
