= History of the Republic of Korea Navy =

Korean naval history

The Republic of Korea Navy was founded on November 11, 1945 as Marine Defense Group after Korea was liberated from the Empire of Japan. The ROK Navy is the oldest service within the ROK Armed Forces. In 2015, the South Korean navy celebrated its 70th anniversary.

Since the Korean War, the ROK Navy had concentrated its efforts on building naval forces against the North Korean navy, which has littoral naval capabilities. As South Korea's economy grew, the ROK Navy was able to locally build larger and better equipped fleets to deter aggression, to protect the sea lines of communication, and to support the nation's foreign policy. As part of its mission, the ROK Navy has engaged in several peacekeeping operations since the turn of the 21st century.

The ROK Navy aims to become a blue-water navy in the 2020s.

== Origins ==
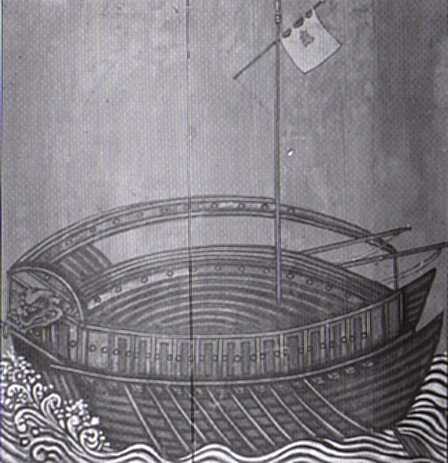
Early 15th century Korean turtle ship in an illustration dating to 1795

Korea has a long history of naval activities. In the late 4th century during the Three Kingdoms Period, Goguryeo defeated Baekjae by operating amphibious forces of 40,000 men. In 732, the Balhae navy "attacked the Shandong peninsula and destroyed the biggest seaport of the Tang Empire in the east – Dengzhou". In the 9th century, Commissioner Chang Pogo of the Unified Silla established a maritime base called Cheonghaejin in an island to foster trading with China and Japan, and to eradicate pirates.

In 1380, the naval forces of the Goryeo Dynasty defeated 500 vessels of invading Japanese pirates by deploying shipboard guns, devised by Ch'oe Mu-sŏn, which is claimed to be the first use of shipboard guns in the naval history. In 1389 and 1419, the Korean naval force invaded Tsushima Island to suppress the Japanese pirate. In the early years of the Joseon Dynasty, the naval forces once reached its peak of 50,000 personnel due to the pirate issue.

During the Japanese invasions of Korea (the Imjin War) in the 16th century, the Korean naval force commanded by Admiral Yi Sunshin, who later became the head of the Navy (Commander-in-Chief, Three-Provincial Fleet), cut off the invaders' naval life line and defeated the Japanese fleet reversing the war in favor of Joseon. Comparing Yi Sunshin to Lord Nelson, Admiral George Alexander Ballard of the Royal Navy commented: "It is always difficult for Englishmen to admit that Nelson ever had an equal in his profession, but if any man is entitled to be so regarded, it should be this great naval commander of Asiatic race who never knew defeat and died in the presence of the enemy[.]" Admiral Yi is also accredited with improving the Turtle Ship.

By the end of the 19th century, the Joseon navy had no significant naval force other than coast defense fortresses. In 1893, the Joseon court requested the British Consul-General to dispatch a naval officer for organizing a naval school in an attempt to modernize the navy. In September 1893, the navy school was established in Ganghwa Island. Lieutenant William H. Callwell, a retired British naval officer, and John W. Curtis of the Royal Marines, a gunnery instructor, served as instructors for 160 cadets and sailor recruits. However, the Royal Naval Academy was closed in November 1894, and the Joseon navy (i.e. Commander-in-Chief Three-Provincial Fleet) was brought to an end in 1895 due to the First Sino-Japanese War and the Gabo Reform. In 1900, the government of the Korean Empire purchased its first modern naval ship, KIS Yangmu (Hanja: 揚武), from Japan. She was originally a cargo ship called the Kachidatemaru. In 1900, the revenue cruiser, Gwangje (光濟) was delivered for the Korean maritime customs. She was built by Kawasaki Dockyard Company. The Korean naval tradition was disrupted after Korea was annexed by the Empire of Japan in 1910.

== Founding years ==
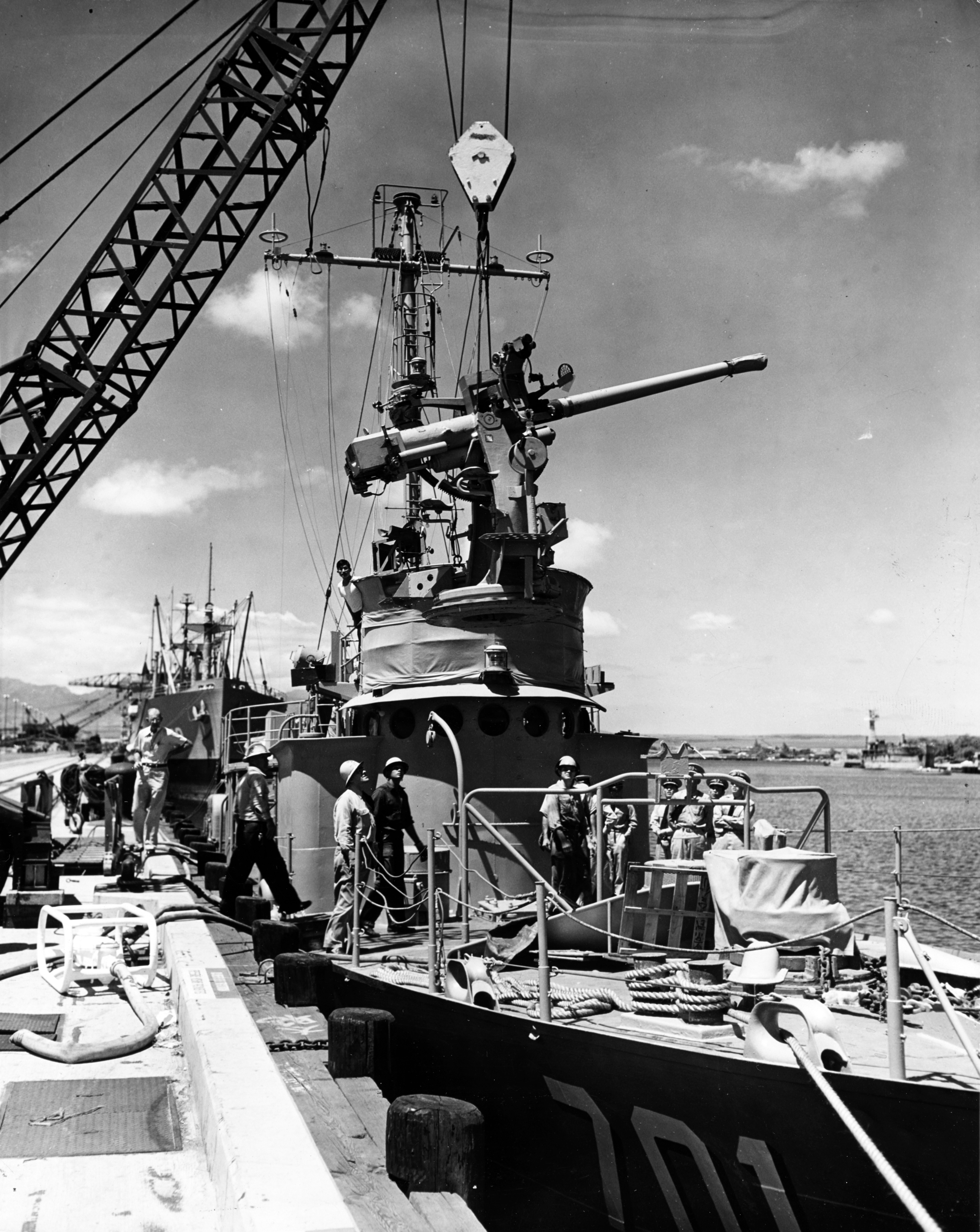
Rearming ROKS Beakdusan (PC 701) at Hawaii in March 1950

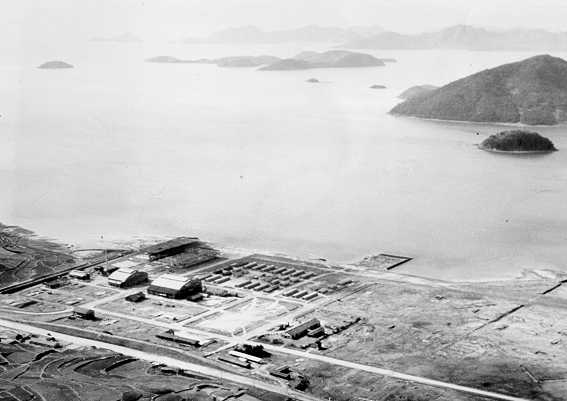
Deoksan airfield (present-day Jinhae naval airfield), where the ROKMC was founded, c. 1950

Shortly after Korea was liberated from the Empire of Japan on August 15, 1945, Sohn Won-yil, a former merchant mariner and son of the Methodist minister and independence activist Sohn Jung-do, led the Maritime Affairs Association. The Maritime Affairs Association evolved into the Marine Defense Group on November 11, 1945 (Navy Foundation Day), and some 70 people proceeded to the former Imperial Japanese Navy's Chinkai Guard District at Jinhae to establish a naval unit. In June 1946, the Marine Defense Group became the Korean Coast Guard, and officially recognized by the United States Army Military Government in Korea. The Korean Coast Guard acquired 36 patrol craft (mainly ex-IJN and USN minecraft) through the Military Government. Meanwhile, the Military Government provided limited assistance through U.S. Navy (USN) and U.S. Coast Guard personnel then in South Korea. After the South Korean government was established on August 15, 1948, the Korean Coast Guard formally became the Republic of Korea Navy (ROKN), and Sohn was appointed as the first Chief of Naval Operations of the ROK Navy on September 5, 1948.

In October 1949, the ROK Navy purchased a 600-ton submarine chaser, the former USS PC-823 on the American civil market with funds raised among its personnel. She was renamed as ROKS Baekdusan (PC 701) after Paektu Mountain, and became "the first significant warship of the newly independent nation" (later on the first night of the Korean War, she sank a 1,000-ton North Korean freighter loaded with 600 troops toward the vital South Korean port of Busan). The Navy purchased three additional PC-461-class submarine chasers before the Korean War.

On April 15, 1949, the Republic of Korea Marine Corps (ROKMC) was founded at Deoksan airfield in Jinhae. The Marine Corps carried out Suppression Operations against communist elements in Jinju and Jeju Island.

== Korean War and 1950s ==
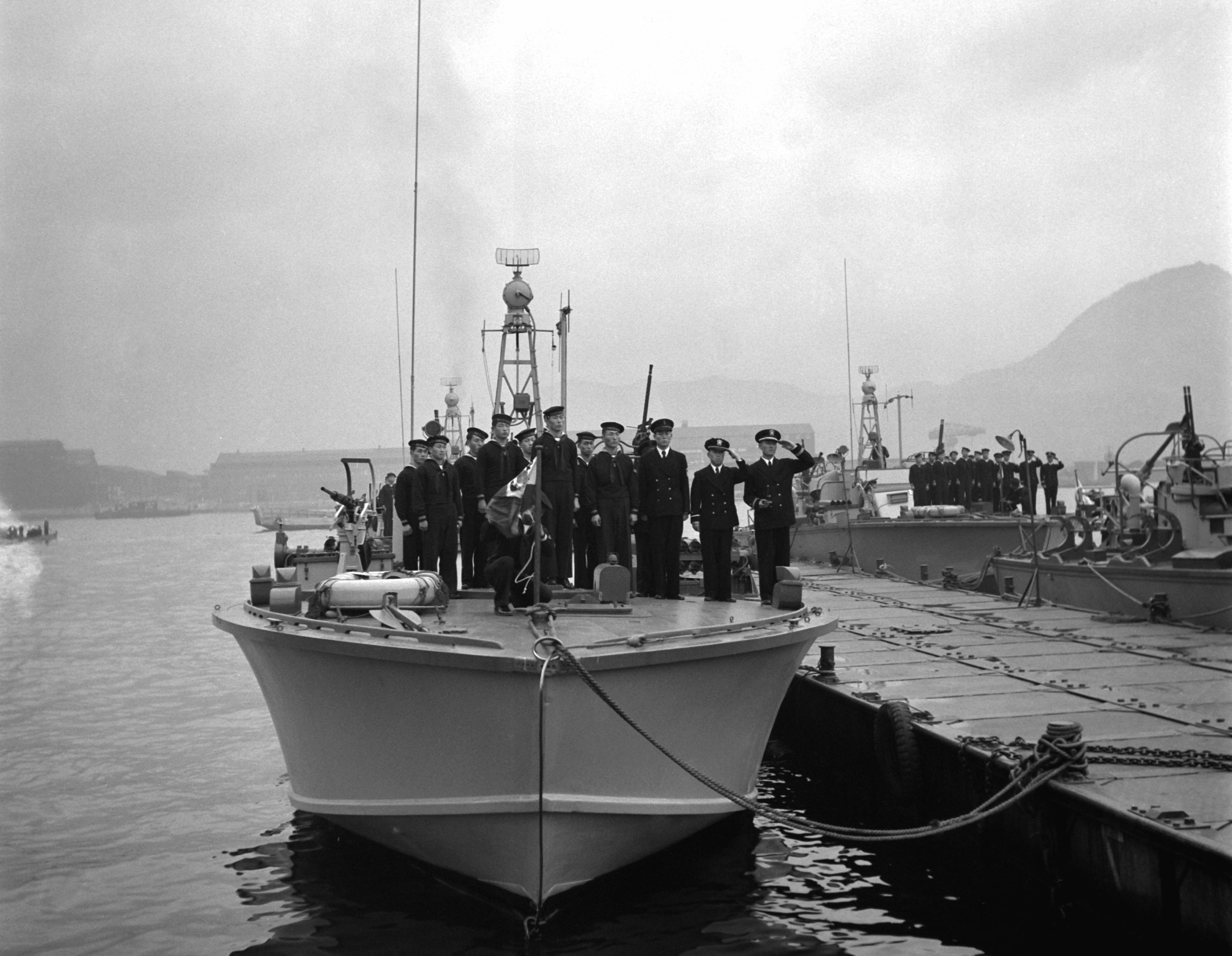
ROK Navy personnel acquiring PT boats in 1952

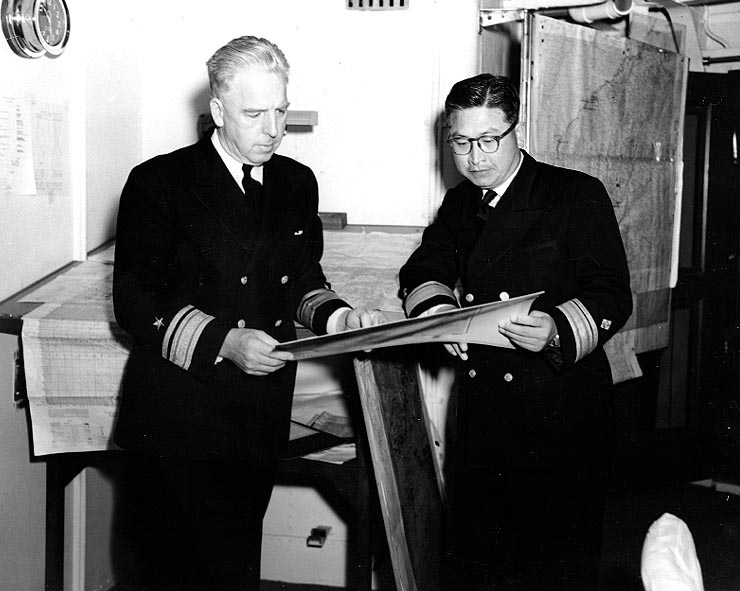
Rear Admiral Sohn Won-yil discussing Korean War operations with Rear Admiral A.E. Smith, USN

The Korean War started with the North Korean army's surprise attack on Sunday, June 25, 1950. The infant ROK Navy confronted threats from the stronger North Korean navy: "Perhaps the most aggressive and effective, if smallest, member of the South Korean armed services during the first year of the Korean War was the Republic of Korea Navy. At the outset of the conflict, the 6,956-man ROKN, with [33] naval vessels of various types, was outnumbered by the 13,700 men and 110 naval vessels of the North Korean navy." With its UN allies, dominated by U.S. forces, the ROK Navy was able to gain control in the seas surrounding the country; the ROK Navy secured the seas south of the 38th parallel. After the Incheon landing, the ROK Navy proceeded to take control of the entire seas surrounding the Korean peninsula, as a task group (Task Group 95.7) of the UN Blockading and Escort Force (Task Force 95). When UN troops withdrew from the north, due to the entry of Chinese troops, the ROK Navy conducted evacuation operations for the UN troops and Korean refugees with the UN allies. On July 27, 1953, the three-year-long war was brought to an end when an armistice agreement was signed. During the war, Australia, Canada, Colombia, France, the Netherlands, New Zealand, Thailand, the United Kingdom, and the United States contributed naval vessels as UN allies; Denmark sent the hospital ship Jutlandia. During the Korean War, the ROK Navy acquired 28 ex-USN ships including five Tacoma-class frigates.

The Mutual Defense Treaty between South Korea and the United States was signed on 1 October 1953. In 1955, the South Korean government and the United States government made an agreement concerning the loan of U.S. Navy vessels. From 1955 to 1960, the ROK Navy acquired 42 ex-USN warships including two Cannon-class destroyer escorts.

In September 1953, the ROK Navy established the Republic of Korea Fleet, which was responsible for the operation and training of the ships. Fleet Aviation Unit was established in 1957.

On July 30, 1960, ROKS Gangwon (DE 72), formerly USS Sutton (DE-771), sank the North Korean navy patrol ship PBS 371 off the coast of Geojin.

== 1960s ==
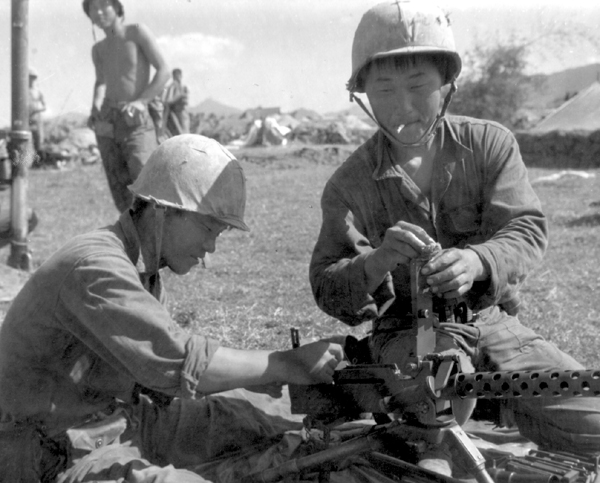
ROK Marines prepare defensive positions near Tuy Hòa, in S. Vietnam, c. 1965.

Continuing from the 1950s, the ROK Navy continued to build naval surface forces mainly with World War II-era warships transferred from the U.S. Navy. In May 1963, the ROK Navy acquired its first destroyer ROKS Chungmu (DD 91 and later DD 911), the former USS Erben, a Fletcher-class destroyer.

On October 3, 1964, ROKS Chungnam (DE 73, later DE 821), formerly USS Holt, "successfully prosecuted an unidentified submarine contact for more than 17 hours until the contact surfaced and was positively identified as a Soviet Whiskey-class submarine with pendant number 017".

During the Vietnam War, the ROK Navy dispatched the Naval Transport Group called Baekgu ("Seagull"), which was composed of three Landing Ship Tanks (LST) and two Landing Ship Mediums (LSM). The Republic of Korea Marine Corps sent the 2nd Marine Brigade called Cheongnyong ("Blue Dragon") to South Vietnam. In April 1975, just before the Fall of Saigon, ROKS Gyebong (LST 810), formerly USS Berkshire County (LST-288), and ROKS Bukhan (LST 815), formerly USS Linn County (LST-900), evacuated about 1,300 South Vietnamese and South Koreans from South Vietnam to South Korea.

In 1969, the ROK Navy began "Isolated Islands Visiting Program" to support people living in small and remote islands around the peninsula.

On January 14, 1967, ROKS Chungnam (DE 73) collided with the wooden-hulled 140-ton coastal ferry Hanil, off Gadeok Island, resulting in death of the ferry's 94 passengers and crew. On January 19, 1967, ROKS Dangpo (PCE 56), the former USS Marfa (PCE-842), was sunk by North Korean coastal artillery north of the demarcation line off the east coast of Korea. USS Pueblo was captured by North Korea in January 1968. On June 5, 1970, a navy broadcast vessel (I 2) was captured and abducted by North Korean patrol craft in the vicinity of Yeonpyeong Islands in the West Sea (Yellow Sea).

== 1970s and 1980s ==
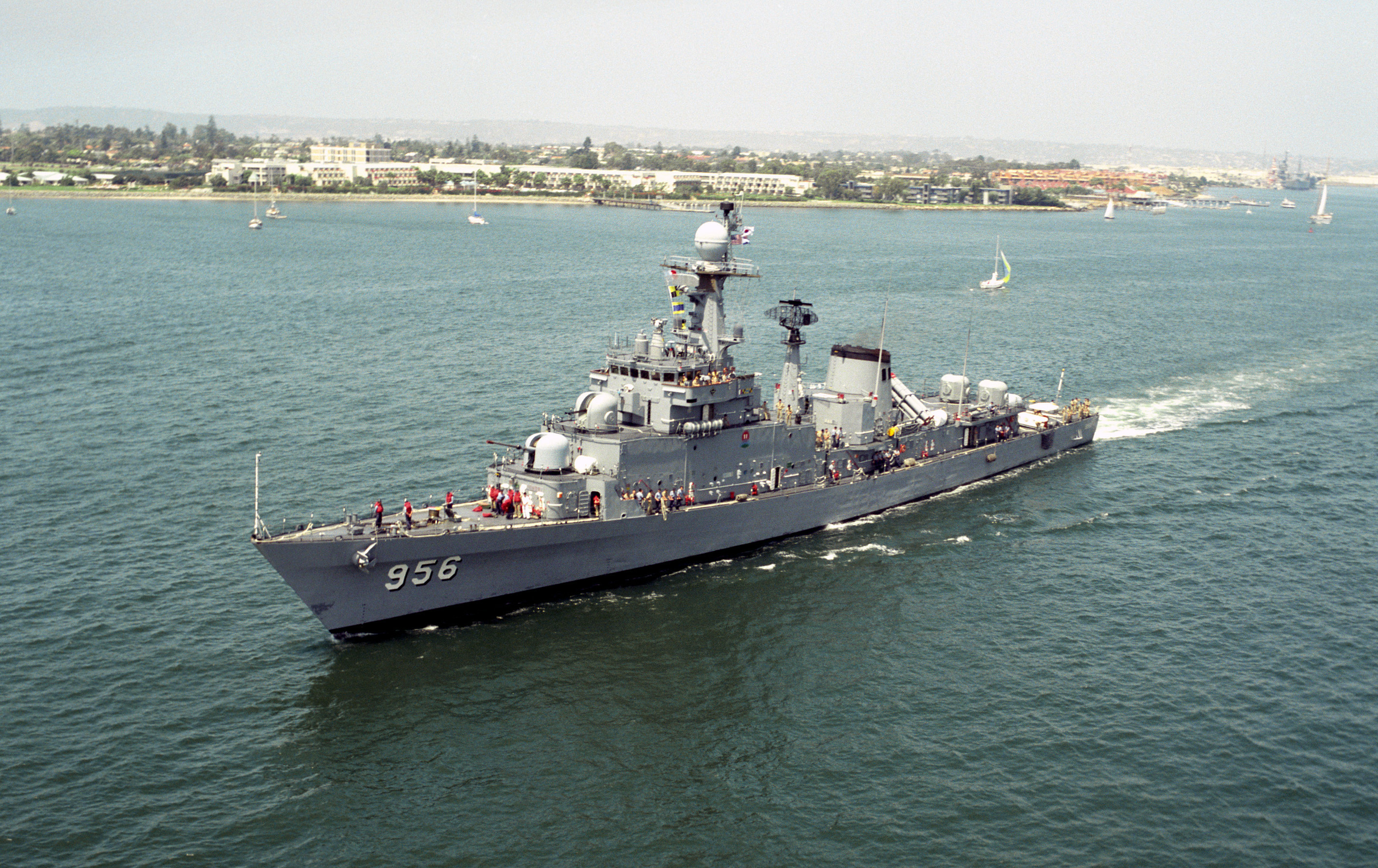
ROKS Gyeongbuk (FF 956), one of the Navy's first locally built Ulsan-class frigates

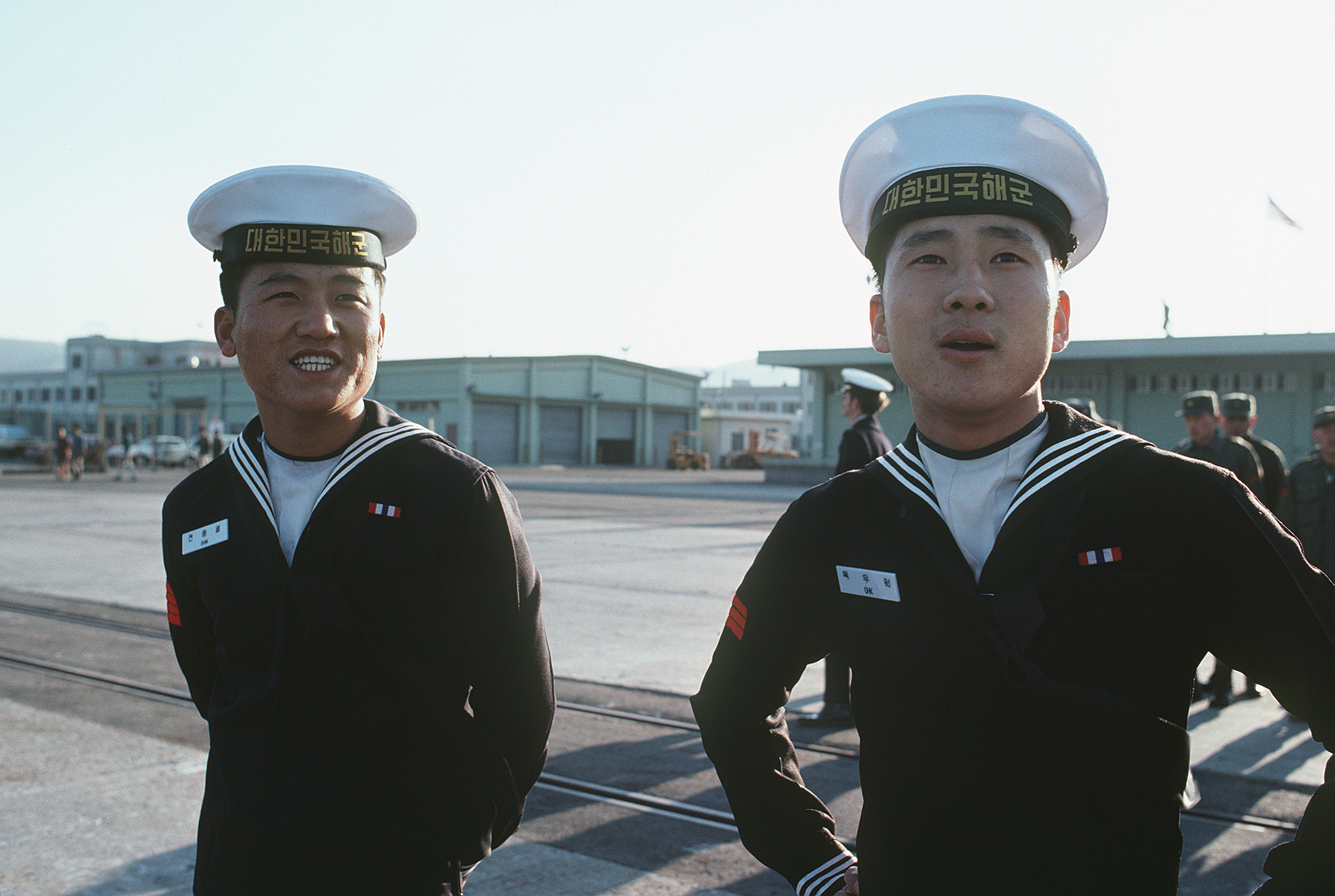
ROKN seamen in the early 1980s. The lettering on their hats reads "Republic of Korea Navy" in Korean.

In the 70s, the ROK Navy, through the Park Chung-hee Administration's "Yulgok Plan" (an 8-year national defense plan "to build up self-reliant, national defense capability"), began to establish a fleet of locally built warships. The Navy acquired shipbuilding capabilities by planning and building high-speed patrol craft such as Baekgu class and Chamsuri class in the 1970s – in November 1972, the ROK Navy launched its first domestically built fast patrol craft to intercept North Korean spy boats.

The lead ship (FF 951) of the 2,000-ton Ulsan-class frigates was launched in 1980. The lead ship (PCC 751) of the 1,000-ton Donghae-class corvettes and the lead ship (PCC 756) of the updated Pohang-class corvettes were launched in 1982 and 1984 respectively. The lead ship of, secretly developed, the Dolgorae-class midget submarine was launched in April, 1983. With local shipbuilders, the ROK Navy continued to carry out other shipbuilding programs for such as the Gojunbong-class tank landing ship, mine warfare ship (Wonsan-class minelayer, Ganggyeong-class minesweeper), Cheonji-class logistics support ship, and Cheonghaejin-class submarine rescue ship in the 1980s and 1990s.

The Fleet Aviation Unit became the Fleet Air Wing in 1977. The ROK Navy strengthened its naval aviation force by acquiring Grumman S-2 Tracker anti-submarine warfare aircraft and Aérospatiale Alouette III helicopters for shipboard helicopter operations with ex-USN Gearing-class destroyers. In 1986, the Fleet Air Wing became the Air Wing SIX. In 1973 and 1974, the ROK Navy reorganized its fleets into five Naval Sectors. In 1986, the ROK Navy reorganized its fleets: First Fleet, Second Fleet, and Third Fleet. In November 1987, the Headquarters Republic of Korea Marine Corps was re-established; it was disbanded in October 1973 due to budget constraint.

On February 22, 1974, a Navy harbor tug (YTL 30) capsized off Tongyeong, resulting in death of 153 Navy, Coast Guard recruits and 6 sailors.

== 1990s ==
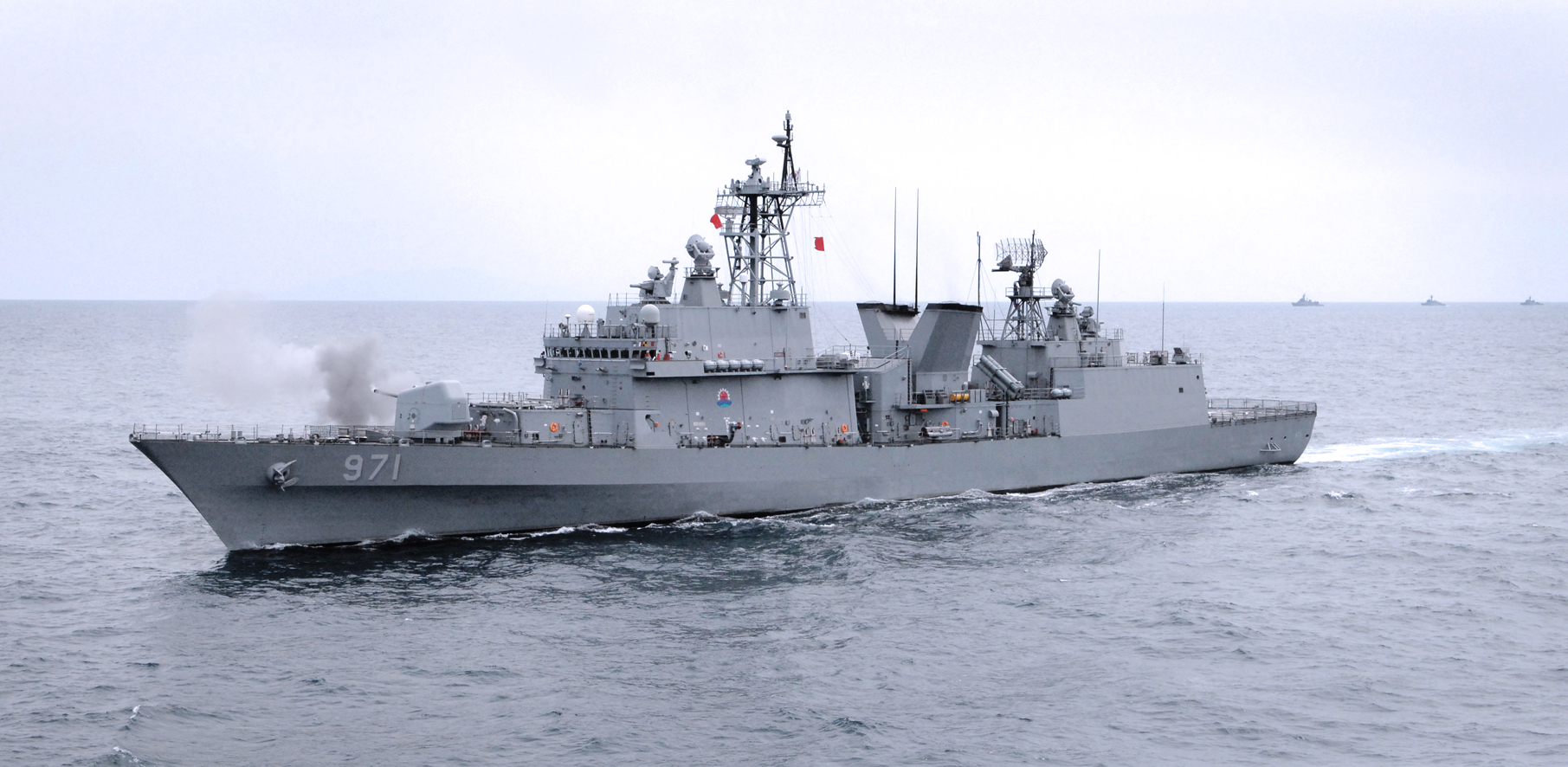
ROKS Kwanggaeto the Great (DDH 971), the Navy's first indigenously built destroyer

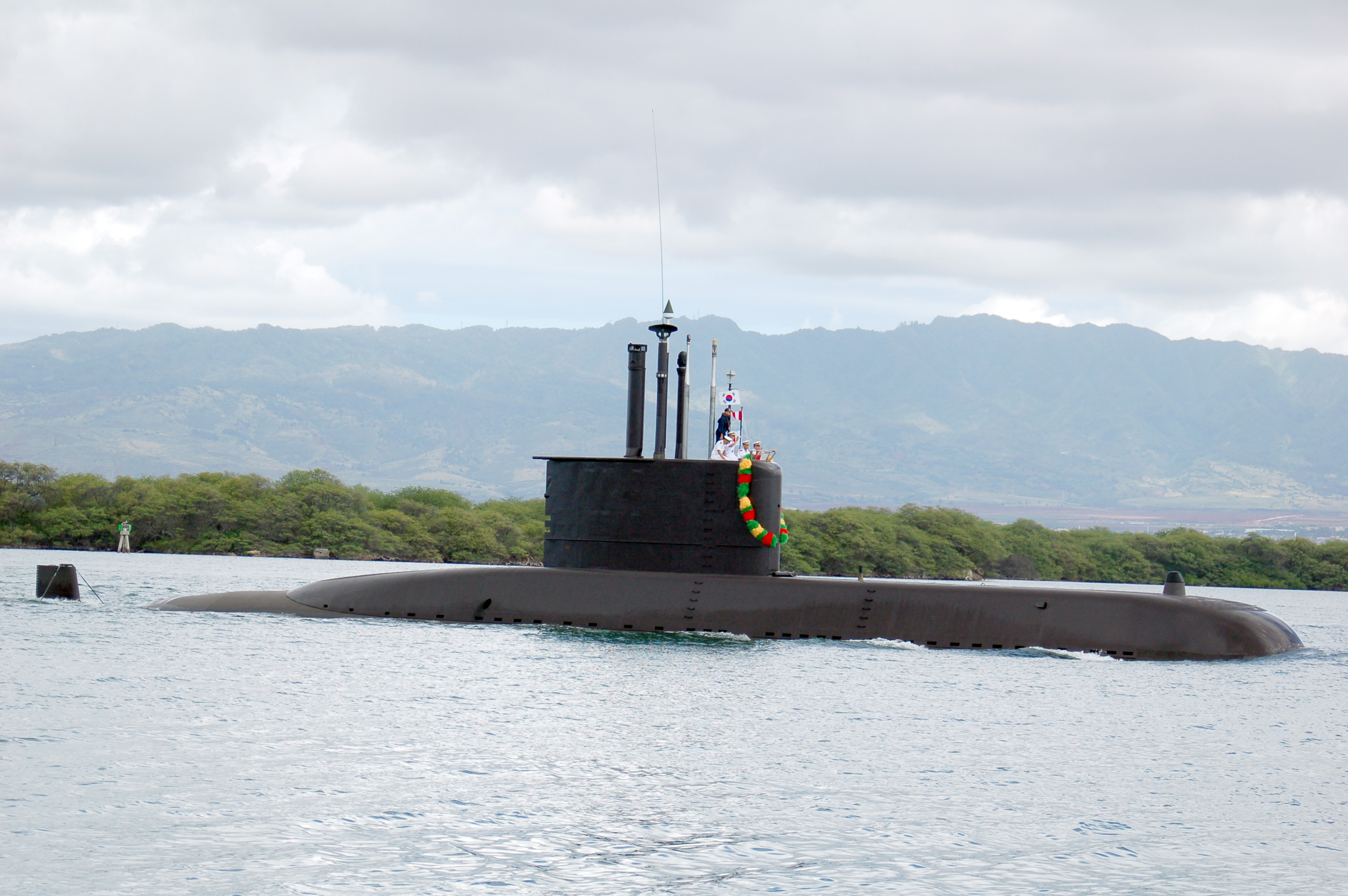
ROKS Lee Sunsin (SS 068), one of the Navy's first locally built Chang Bogo-class submarines

Since the 1990s, the ROK Navy has been trying to build an ocean-going fleet to protect the sea lines of communication as South Korea's dependence on foreign trade increases. In 1989, the Navy mentioned the "Strategic Task Fleet" (Jeollyak-gidong-hamdae) in the Joint Strategic Objectives Plan. The ROK Naval forces began to participate in RIMPAC exercise from 1990 (ROKS Seoul (FF 952), ROKS Masan (FF 955) for RIMPAC 1990). On March 8, 1991, when giving the commencement speech at the ROK Naval Academy's graduation ceremony, President Roh Tae-woo addressed that the Navy should transform into the "blue-water navy". In 1992, the ROK Navy ships – ROKS Chungnam (FF 953) and ROKS Masan (FF 955) of the Cruise Training Unit circumnavigated the world for the first time. On March 24, 1995, President Kim Young-sam affirmed that the Navy should have the Task Fleet and pave the way for a new era of blue-water navy when speaking at the Naval Academy's graduation. On April 1, 1995, Admiral An Pyong-tae, the 20th Chief of Naval Operations, reaffirmed that the Navy should prepare to build the blue-water navy in his inaugural address. President Kim supported the Navy by approving a long-term shipbuilding plan for the ocean-going navy. In 1999, the Navy presented its strategic vision for the 2020s as "Navy Vision 2020" that outlined the Navy's future Task Fleet, which includes light aircraft carriers and ballistic missile submarines.

At the same time, the ROK Navy has been steadily upgrading its naval forces. As part of the plan to strengthen the surface combatant forces, ROKS Kwanggaeto the Great (DDH 971), the ROK Navy's first locally built destroyer, was launched in 1996; the Kwanggaeto the Great-class destroyers replaced the aged former USN Allen M. Sumner and Gearing-class destroyers. For building submarines forces, the ROK Navy acquired its first submarine (excluding midget submarines) ROKS Chang Bogo (SS 061) from Germany in 1992. The following eight Chang Bogo-class submarines were built in Korea. In order to replace the aged S-2 Trackers, Lockheed P-3C Orion maritime patrol aircraft were delivered to the ROK Navy from 1995.

In June 1993, the ROK Navy Headquarters was relocated from Seoul to the Gyeryongdae complex, the tri-service headquarters in Gyeryong. In November 1999, the ROK Navy completed the construction of Pyeongtaek Naval Operations Base; Commander Second Fleet was relocated from Incheon Naval Base to the newly established base with an operational headquarters.

In October 1998, the ROK Navy hosted its first International Fleet Review in commemoration of the 50th anniversary of the Republic of Korea and its armed forces off coast of Busan and Jinhae. About 60 ships from 12 countries participated in the fleet review including the South Korean navy.

In June 1999, the ROK Navy forces engaged the North Korea naval forces near the Northern Limit Line (NLL) in the vicinity of Yeonpyeong Island. In June 2002, the two navies engaged again in the same vicinity resulting in the sinking of ROKS Chamsuri 357 (PKM 357).

== 2000s ==
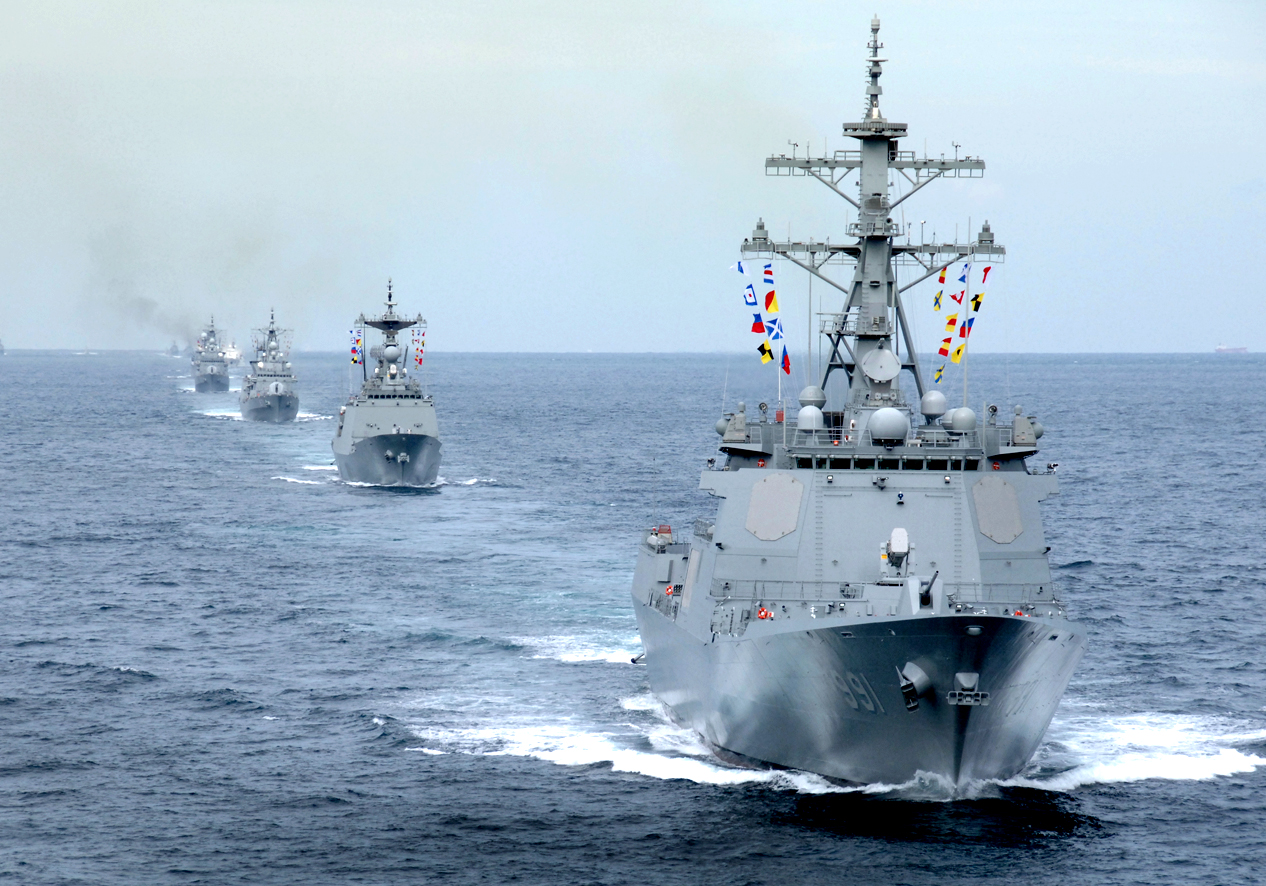
The Navy's first locally built AEGIS destroyer, ROKS Sejong the Great (DDG 991), in formation

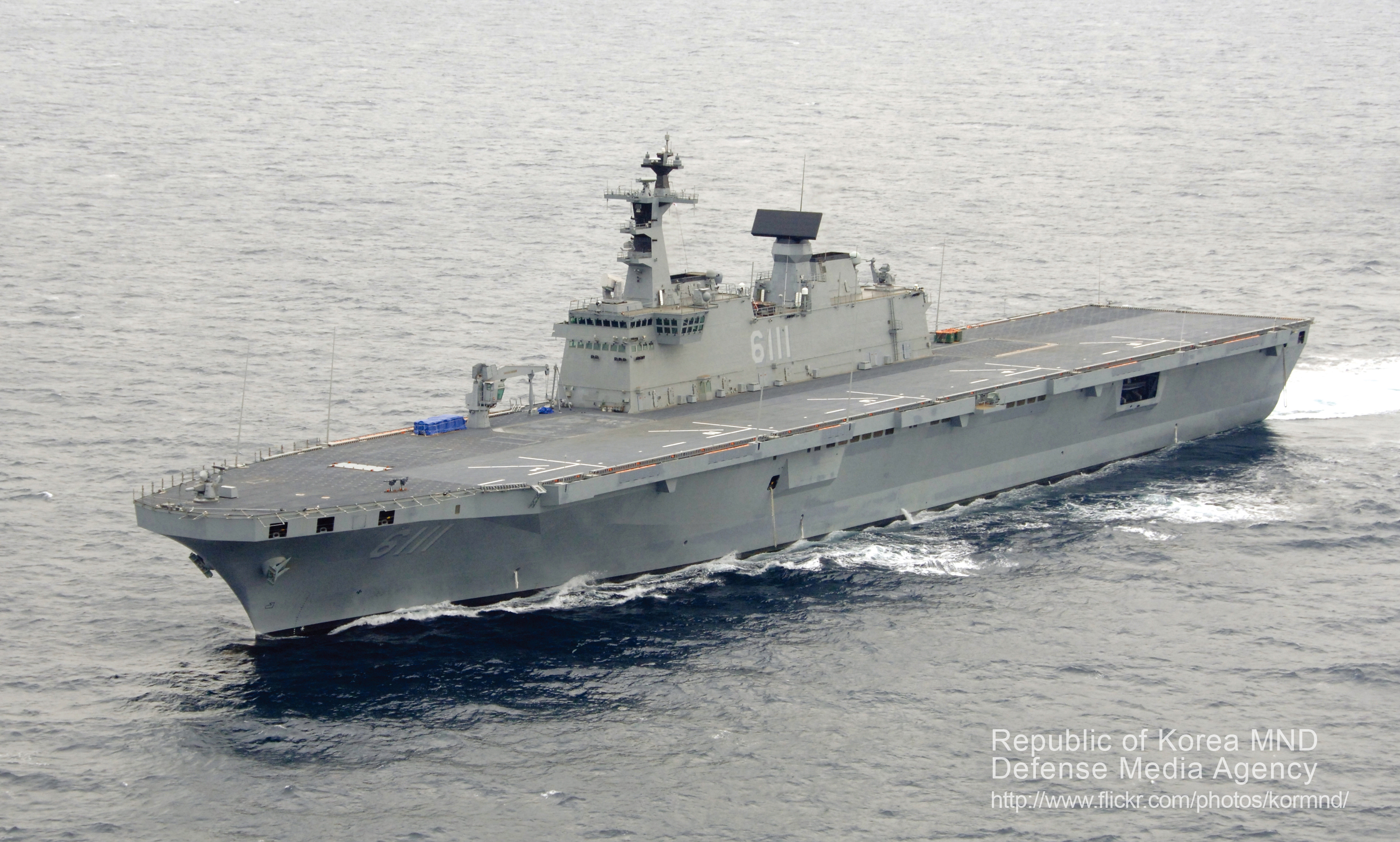
Amphibious transport dock, ROKS Dokdo (LPH 6111)

The ROK Navy continues to put its efforts to build the blue-water navy. In March 2001, President Kim Dae-jung revealed that the Navy will establish the Strategic Task Fleet. Succeeding President Kim, President Roh Moo-hyun also supported the Navy's plan for the Task Fleet to become a blue-water navy. In 2008, the Navy updated its strategic vision for the 2030s as "Navy Vision 2030".

The ROK Navy continued to strengthen the fleet. In 2002, the lead ship (DDH 975) of the 4,500-ton Chungmugong Yi Sunshin-class destroyer was launched. In 2005, the 14,000-ton amphibious landing ship, ROKS Dokdo (LPH 6111) was launched. In 2006, the ROK Navy launched the lead ship (SS 072) of the 1,800-ton Sohn Wonyil-class submarine, which was named after the first Chief of Naval Operations, equipped with air-independent propulsion (AIP) system. In May 2007, the ROK Navy launched the lead ship (DDG 991) of the Sejong the Great-class destroyers, built around the Aegis combat system and the SPY-1D multi-function phased array radar. In June 2007, the ROK Navy launched the lead ship (PKG 711) of the Yoon Youngha-class missile boat in honor of the late captain of ROKS Chamsuri 357, which was sunk after an engagement with the North Korean navy in 2002.

The ROK Navy completed the construction of Busan Naval Operations Base in June 2006; Commander Third Fleet was moved to the newly established operational headquarters. In November 2007, Commander Third Fleet was relocated to Mokpo while disestablishing Mokpo Naval Sector Defense Command. In December 2007, Commander-in-Chief Republic of Korea Fleet (CINCROKFLT) moved its command headquarters from Jinhae Naval Base to Busan Naval Operations Base. Jinhae had been CINCROKFLT's homeport since 1953.

As part of its mission, the ROK Navy participated in several peacekeeping operations since the turn of the century. From 2001 to 2003, a naval transport unit called Haeseong supported the Operation Enduring Freedom and the Sangnoksu Unit in East Timor. In 2005, the Navy dispatched a transport unit called Jejung to supply aid in humanitarian response to the 2004 Indian Ocean earthquake.

In 2004, the ROK Navy hosted a multilateral naval exercise – Pacific Reach 2004 – for the first time. The Cruise Training Fleet – ROKS Chungmugong Yi Sunshin (DDH 975) and ROKS Cheonji (AOE 57) – visited the United Kingdom in order to take part in the International Fleet Review for Trafalgar 200 in 2005. The ROK Navy hosted its second international fleet review off coast of Busan in October 2008 to celebrate the 60th anniversary of the South Korean government.

On March 26, 2010, ROKS Cheonan (PCC 772), a Pohang-class corvette was sunk by a North Korean torpedo, resulting in death of 46 sailors near Baengnyeong Island, in the vicinity of the Northern Limit Line (NLL).

== Present: 2010s ==
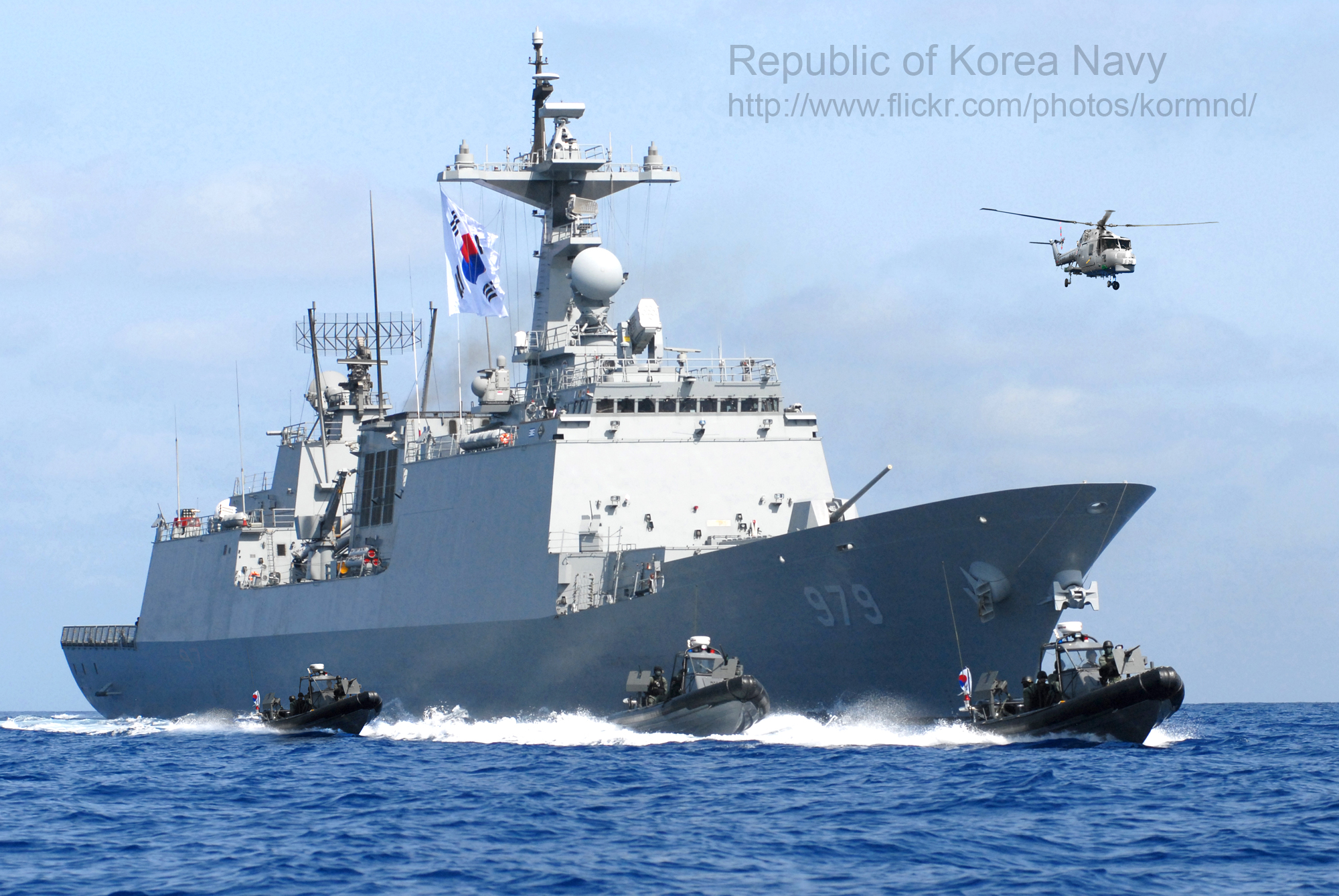
The Cheonghae unit of the multinational naval task force, Combined Task Force 151

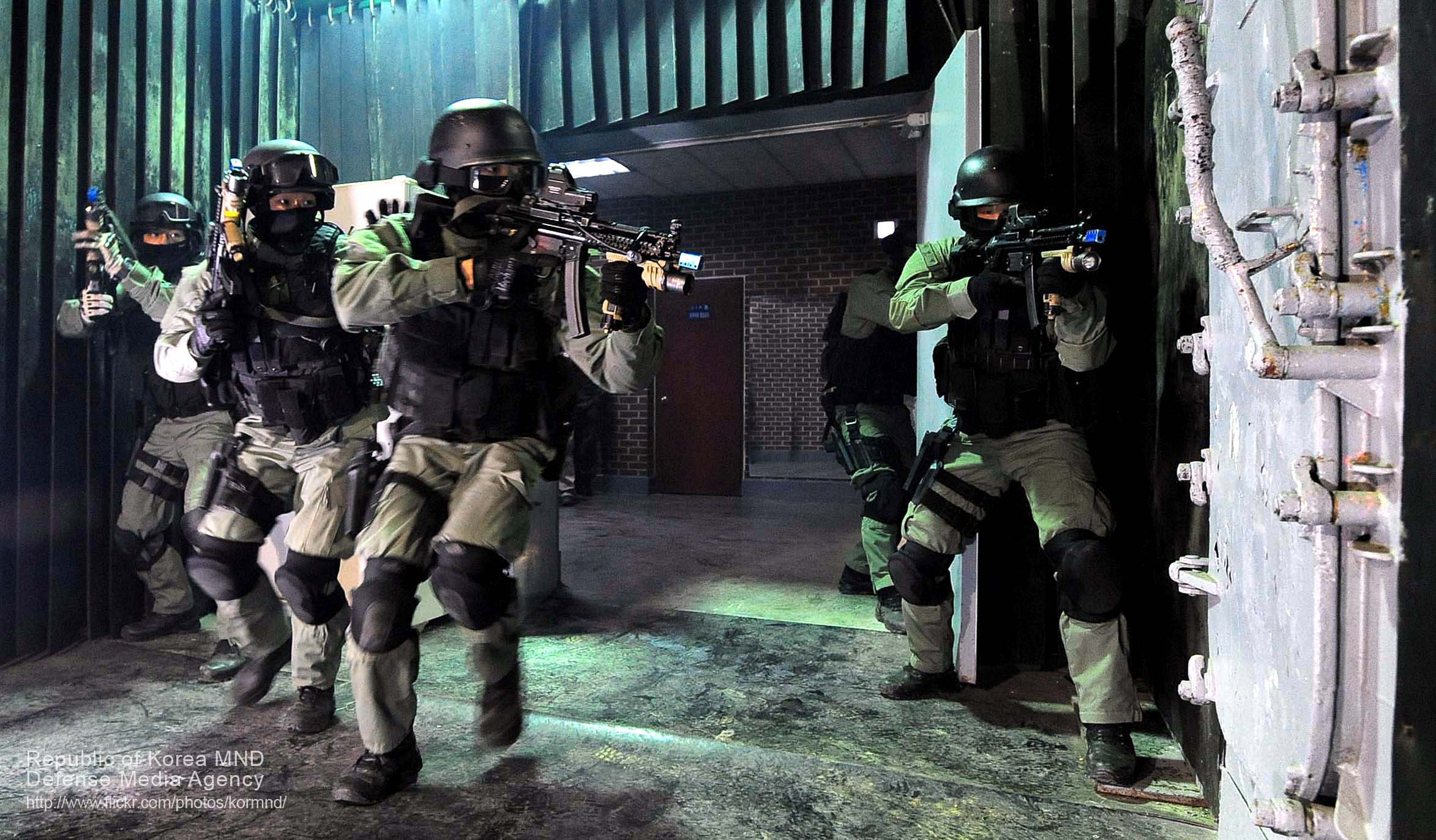
ROK naval commandos in a mock assault. They rescued captured tanker's crew from Somali pirates in 2011.

In preparation for an ocean-going navy, the ROK Navy established a task force called Maritime Task Flotilla Seven in February 2010. The task force is responsible for the defense of South Korea against sea-borne threats and protection of its sea lines of communication.

Since 2009, a Chungmugong Yi Sunshin-class destroyer from the task force is being deployed as the Escort Task Group (Cheonghae) in response to piracy off the coast of Somalia. On January 21, 2011, naval commandos of the task group carried out an operation, and succeeded in rescuing the crew of the hijacked MV Samho Jewelry. As a humanitarian operation, the unit was dispatched to evacuate South Koreans and foreign nationals from war-torn Libya in 2011 and 2014.

In December 2013, as part of the ROK Joint Support Group for the Philippines (the Araw unit), ROKS Birobong (LST 682), ROKS Seonginbong (LST 685), and Marines were deployed in humanitarian response to Typhoon Haiyan.

In February 2016, the ROK Navy completed a new naval base on the southern coast of Jeju Island for basing the Maritime Task Flotilla and a submarine squadron, in order to strengthen its control over the seas around the Korean Peninsula and to protect the sea lines of communication. It is also known as Jeju Civilian-Military Complex Port because the Jeju Naval Base is designed to be jointly used by military and civilians.

In order to support ocean-going operations, the ROK Navy commissioned the 10,000-ton logistics support ship, ROKS Soyang (AOE 51), and launched the first locally designed 3,000-ton submarine, Dosan Ahn Changho (SS 083) in September 2018.

The ROK Navy continued shipbuilding programs to upgrade the fleet with local shipbuilders. In order to replace the aging Pohang-class corvettes and Ulsan-class frigates, and to take over multi-role operations such as coast patrol and anti-submarine warfare, the ROK Navy commissioned six 2,300-ton Incheon-class frigates between 2013 and 2016, and the lead ship (FFG 818) of the 2,800-ton Daegu-class frigates in March 2018. Two ex-USN Edenton-class salvage and rescue ships were replaced with two locally built 3500-ton Tongyeong-class salvage and rescue ships between 2014 and 2016. The Navy commissioned a 3,000-ton minelayer, ROKS Nampo (MLS 570) in June 2017. The lead ship of the PKX-B fast rocket patrol craft, ROKS Chamsuri 211 (PKMR 211), was commissioned in November 2017 to relieve the aging fleet of Chamsuri-class patrol craft. The ROK Navy commissioned four 4,500-ton Cheonwangbong-class dock landing ships between 2014 and 2018. In May 2018, the Navy launched the Marado (LPH 6112), which was the second ship of the Dokdo-class amphibious transport dock. In June 2018, the Navy launched a 4,500-ton training ship, the Hansando (ATH 81), which was also designed as a casualty receiving and treatment ship (CRTS).

In October 2018, the Navy hosted its third international fleet review off coast of Jeju Island.

In 2019, the Navy updated its strategic vision for the 100th anniversary of the ROK Navy as "Navy Vision 2045". As part of the vision, Admiral Sim Seung-seob, the Chief of Naval Operations proposed to build an ICT-based, system-driven "Smart Navy".

== See also ==
- Battle of Haeju
- Gangneung Infiltration
- 1998 Sokcho submarine incident
- Battle of Yosu
- First Battle of Yeonpyeong
- Second Battle of Yeonpyeong
- Battle of Daecheong
- ROKS Cheonan sinking

== Notes ==
Romanization is according to Revised Romanization of Korean (adopted in 2000), with exceptions of personal names. Names of ships commissioned before 2000 might have been romanized according to McCune–Reischauer. Examples of changes (M-R → RR): Chinhae → Jinhae; Inchon → Incheon; Kangnung → Gangneung; Kimpo → Gimpo; Pusan → Busan; Taegu → Daegu.
