= Sin Sun-seong =

Imperial Korean captain (1878–1944)

Sin Sun-seong 신순성
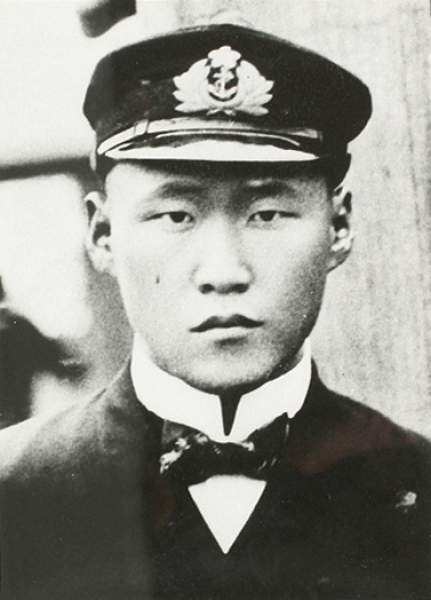
- Born: January 27, 1878; Hanseong, Gyeonggi, Joseon
- Died: February 7, 1944 (aged 66); Incheon, Korea, Empire of Japan
- Military career
- Allegiance: Korea
- Branch: Imperial Korean Navy
- Service years: 1897 – 1938
- Rank: Captain
- Commands: KIS Yangmu; KIS Gwangje

Sin Sun-seong was a captain of the Imperial Korean Navy and known as one of the first naval figures of the Korean Empire. He commanded the KIS Yangmu and the KIS Gwangje and continued to command the Guangjae after its decommission in 1905.

== Biography ==
Sin Sun-seong was born in Hanseong in 1878. After graduating from the Hanseong Foreign Language School, he went to Japan as a government scholarship student in 1895 after being recommended by Park Yung-hyo. While studying at Kumamoto Commercial School, he obtained a preliminary navigator qualification and entered Tokyo Higher Merchant Marine School in 1897.

In 1900, when the Imperial Korean Armed Forces introduced the first modern warship, the KIS Yangmu, by the appointment of Emperor Gojong, Sin Sun-seong was appointed as the captain. In 1900, a new warship, the KIS Gwangje was built, and he assumed the post of commander again however, they were not used as warships until the Japanese Empire disbanded the Korean Empire. On August 28, 1910, on the eve of the Japan–Korea Treaty of 1910, Sin took down the Taegeukgi from the ship at Gwangjeho Lake and carefully stored it before donating the flag to the state where it is currently preserved at the Incheon Naval Museum. When Chosun First Co., Ltd. was founded in 1912, he transferred the Guangjae to the company and he worked as a captain of the current merchant ship. After the Incheon Haewon Training Center opened in 1919, the Guangjae was re-purposed as a training ship and Sun served as the training instructor of the ship and continued this all the way until 1938 when Sin retired. In 1917, Sin moved to Incheon with his family and later died there on February 7, 1944.
