= ROKS Bi Ro Bong =

Go Jun Bong-class landing ship tank

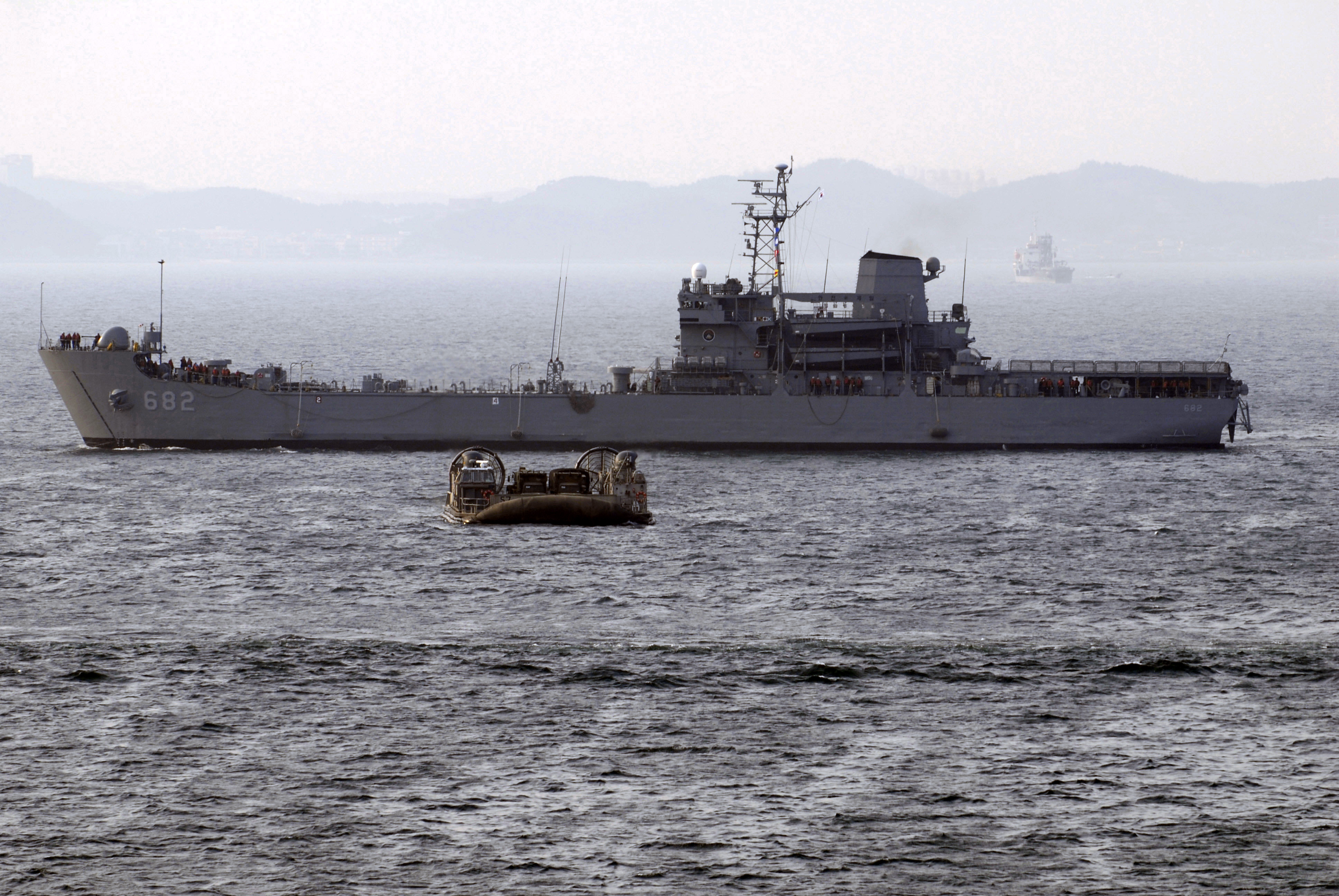
- ROKS Bi Ro Bong on 23 March 2007

History

South Korea
- Name: Bi Ro Bong; (비로봉)
- Builder: Hanjin Heavy Industries, Busan
- Launched: 1995
- Commissioned: 1998
- Identification: Callsign: HLXM; Pennant number: LST-682
- Status: Active

General characteristics
- Class & type: Go Jun Bong-class tank landing ship
- Displacement: 2,600 t (2,559 long tons) light; 4,300 t (4,232 long tons) full (sea-going draft with 1675 ton load)
- Length: 112.7 m (370 ft)
- Beam: 15.4 m (51 ft)
- Draught: 3.1 m (10 ft)
- Installed power: 12,800 hp (9,500 kW)
- Propulsion: 2 × SEMT Pielstick 16 PA6V 280 Diesel engines
- Speed: 16 knots (30 km/h; 18 mph) maximum; 12 knots (22 km/h; 14 mph) cruising
- Range: 4,500 nmi (8,300 km; 5,200 mi)
- Capacity: 258 marines; 12 tanks; 14 amphibious assault vehicles; 8 2.5ton trucks; 4 LCVP
- Crew: 121
- Sensors & processing systems: AN/SPS-54
- Armament: 4 × 40mm Breda L/70K; 2 × Vulcan 20 mm Gatling
- Aircraft carried: 1 × UH-60
- Aviation facilities: Aft helicopter deck

ROKS Bi Ro Bong (LST-682) is a Go Jun Bong-class tank landing ship in the Republic of Korea Navy.

== Construction and commissioning ==
The ship was launched in 1995 by Hanjin Heavy Industries at Busan and commissioned into the Navy in 1998.

On 27 March 2007, she prepared for an amphibious operation by participating in the naval exercise Foal Eagle, alongside the US Navy amphibious assault ships LCAC and USS Essex, USS Tortuga, and USS Juneau.
