= ROKS Hyang Ro Bong =

South Korea Navy tank landing ship

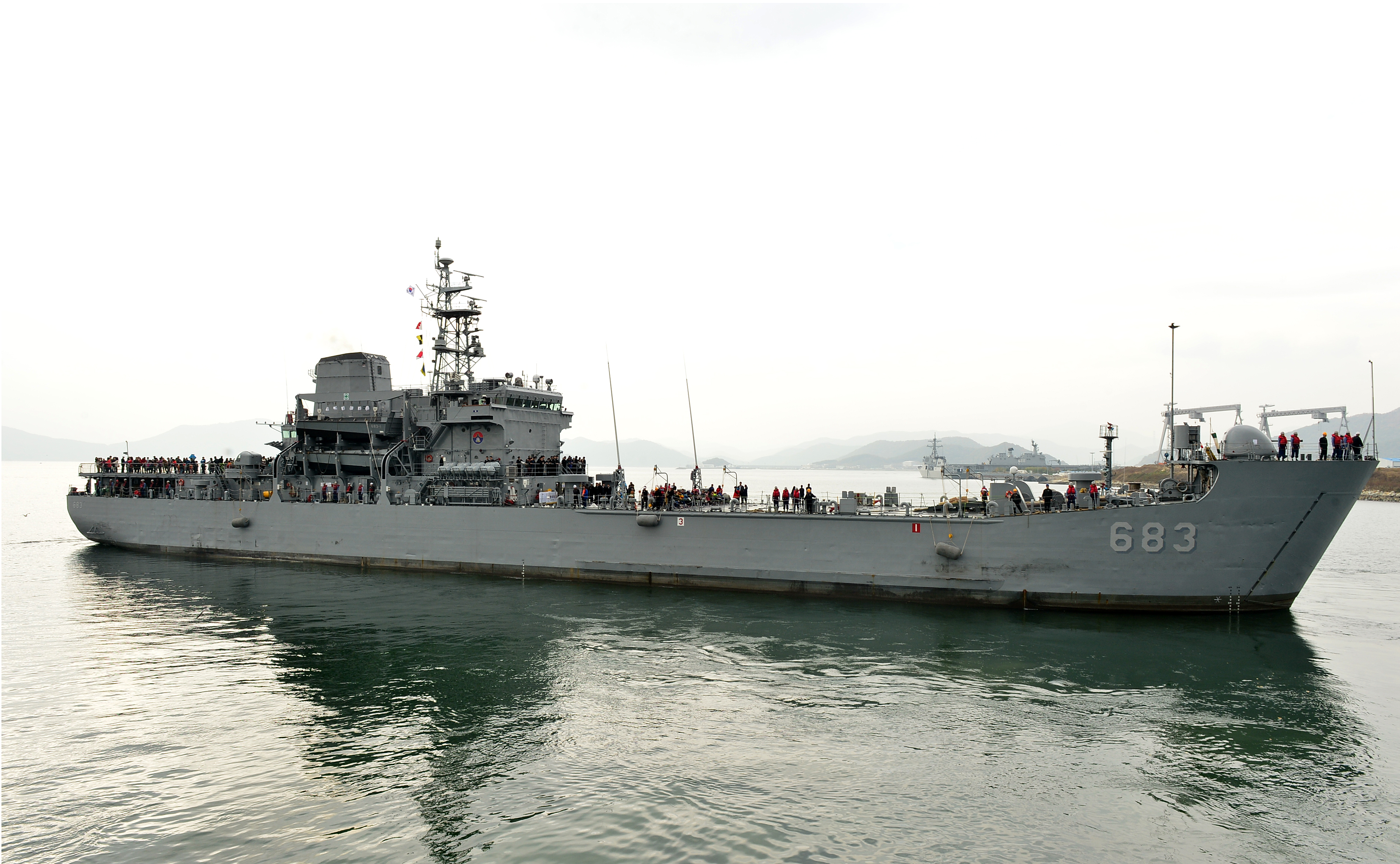
- ROKS Hyang Ro Bong on 10 November 2015

History

South Korea
- Name: Hyang Ro Bong; (향로봉)
- Builder: Hanjin Heavy Industries, Busan
- Launched: 1996
- Commissioned: 1999
- Identification: Pennant number: LST-683
- Status: Active

General characteristics
- Class & type: Go Jun Bong-class tank landing ship
- Displacement: 2,600 t (2,559 long tons) light; 4,300 t (4,232 long tons) full (sea-going draft with 1675 ton load)
- Length: 112.7 m (370 ft)
- Beam: 15.4 m (51 ft)
- Draught: 3.1 m (10 ft)
- Installed power: 12,800 hp (9,500 kW)
- Propulsion: 2 × SEMT Pielstick 16 PA6V 280 Diesel engines
- Speed: 16 knots (30 km/h; 18 mph) maximum; 12 knots (22 km/h; 14 mph) cruising
- Range: 4,500 nmi (8,300 km; 5,200 mi)
- Capacity: 258 marines; 12 tanks; 14 amphibious assault vehicles; 8 2.5ton trucks; 4 LCVP
- Complement: 121
- Sensors & processing systems: AN/SPS-54
- Armament: 4 × 40mm Breda L/70K; 2 × Vulcan 20 mm Gatling
- Aircraft carried: 1 × UH-60
- Aviation facilities: Aft helicopter deck

ROKS Hyang Ro Bong (LST-683) is a Go Jun Bong-class tank landing ship in the Republic of Korea Navy.

== Construction and commissioning ==
The ship was launched in 1996 by Hanjin Heavy Industries at Busan and commissioned into the Navy in 1999.

She participated in the 70th Anniversary of the Navy in 2015.

On 31 July 2025, the ship's engine caught fire as it entered the port of Jinhae, injuring three crew members.
