= ROKS Go Jun Bong =

Go Jun Bong-class landing ship tank

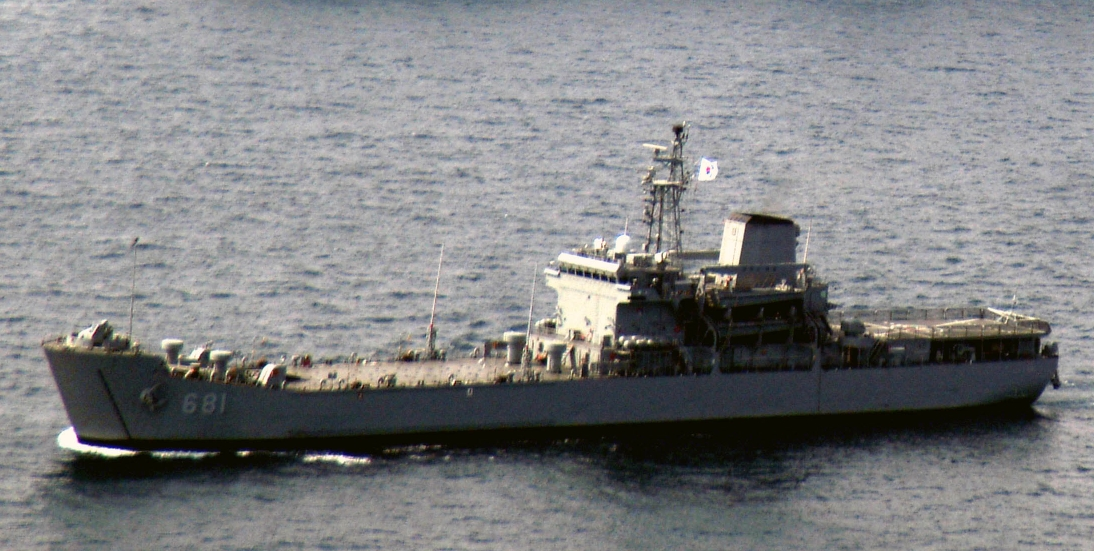
- ROKS Go Jun Bong on 27 March 2004

History

South Korea
- Name: Go Jun Bong; (고준봉)
- Builder: Hanjin Heavy Industries, Busan
- Launched: 1991
- Commissioned: 1994
- Identification: Pennant number: LST-681
- Status: Active

General characteristics
- Class & type: Go Jun Bong-class tank landing ship
- Displacement: 2,600 t (2,559 long tons) light; 4,300 t (4,232 long tons) full (sea-going draft with 1675 ton load)
- Length: 112.7 m (370 ft)
- Beam: 15.4 m (51 ft)
- Draught: 3.1 m (10 ft)
- Installed power: 12,800 hp (9,500 kW)
- Propulsion: 2 × SEMT Pielstick 16 PA6V 280 Diesel engines
- Speed: 16 knots (30 km/h; 18 mph) maximum; 12 knots (22 km/h; 14 mph) cruising
- Range: 4,500 nmi (8,300 km; 5,200 mi)
- Capacity: 258 marines; 12 tanks; 14 amphibious assault vehicles; 8 2.5ton trucks; 4 LCVP
- Crew: 121
- Sensors & processing systems: AN/SPS-54
- Armament: 4 × Emerlec 30mm; 2 × Vulcan 20 mm Gatling
- Aircraft carried: 1 × UH-60
- Aviation facilities: Aft helicopter deck

ROKS Go Jun Bong (LST-681) is the lead ship of the Go Jun Bong-class tank landing ship in the Republic of Korea Navy.

== Construction and commissioning ==
The ship was launched in 1991 by Hanjin Heavy Industries at Busan and commissioned into the Navy in 1994.

On 23 April 2021, 33 COVID-19 cases were reported aboard Go Jun Bong.
