= Bo Sea Pearl-class ship =

Chinese roll-on/roll-off ship class

Class overview
- Operators: People's Liberation Army Navy

General characteristics
- Type: Roll-on/roll-off ships
- Displacement: 35,000 long tons (36,000 t)
- Length: 178.8 m (586 ft 7 in)
- Beam: 28 m (91 ft 10 in)
- Propulsion: marine diesel
- Speed: 18.5 knots (34.3 km/h; 21.3 mph)
- Aviation facilities: helicopter deck

The Bo Sea Pearl class are a series of four roll-on/roll-off (RoRo) ships designed for military/civilian dual use built in the People's Republic of China (PRC) for the People's Liberation Army Navy (PLAN). In peace time, these ships operates as ROPAX for civilian service, and when activated in national emergencies, these ship would act as RoRo ships for PLAN. In their civilian ROPAX role, these ships are designed to carry more than two thousand passengers. Building ships to military requirement cost more than ¥ 60 million in comparison to the less stringent civilian requirement, but this was nonetheless achieved among some opposition. As a result, not only can the three level vehicle decks with clearance of 4.85 meters (15.9 ft) of these ships carry over three hundred vehicles, but they can also handle large equipment or a vehicle that is over 50 meters (160 ft) long, 8 meters (26 ft) wide, and weighs 120 tons. These ships are also equipped with helicopter deck. Specification:

- Length: 178.8 m (586 ft 7 in)
- Beam: 28 m (91 ft 10 in)
- Tonnage: 35,000 GT
- Speed: 18.5 knots (34.3 km/h; 21.3 mph)

Name (English)	Name (Han 中文)	Tonnage	Commissioned	Status
Bo Sea Emerald Pearl	渤海翠珠	36,000 gross ton	August 8, 2012	Active
Bo Sea Crystal Pearl	渤海晶珠	36,000 gross ton	October 10, 2012	Active
Bo Sea Diamond Pearl	渤海钻珠	36,000 gross ton	February 2015	Active
Bo Sea Agat Pearl	渤海玛珠	36,000 gross ton	March 2015	Active
