= Zhong Tie Bo Hai 3 =

Ship

History

PRC
- Commissioned: 2008

General characteristics
- Type: roll-on/roll-off
- Displacement: 25,000 long tons (25,000 t)
- Length: 182.6 m (599 ft 1 in)
- Beam: 24.8 m (81 ft 4 in)
- Draft: 5.2 m (17 ft 1 in)
- Propulsion: Electrical by marine diesel generator
- Speed: 18.8 kt
- Electronic warfare & decoys: None
- Armament: Unarmed
- Armour: None
- Aircraft carried: None
- Aviation facilities: helicopter deck

China Railway Bo Sea 3 (中铁渤海3号) is a military/civilian dual use roll-on/roll-off ship built in the People’s Republic of China (PRC) for the People's Liberation Army Navy (PLAN). Built by Tianjin New Port Shipbuilding Heavy Industries, this ship first entered civilian service in 2008.

This ship is powered electrically by azimuth thrusters, able to reach 18.8 kt top speed. The ship is designed to carry 650 passengers, 120 vehicles, and 50 railway carriages. Deployed as a roll-on/roll-off passenger (ROPAX) during peace time, the ship would be activated in national emergency to be used as a military ro-ro ship, a task the ship has successfully completed in several military exercises such as the one conducted in August 16 – 17, 2016. Specification:

- Length: 182.6 meter
- Beam: 24.8 meter
- Draft: 5.2 meter
- Tonnage: 25000 gross ton
- Speed: 18.8 kt

Name (English)	Name (Han 中文)	Tonnage (t)	Commissioned	Status
China Railway Bo Sea 3	中铁渤海3号	25000	June 18, 2008	Active
