= D-value =

D-value may refer to:

- D-value (microbiology) - the decimal reduction time, the time required at a certain temperature to kill 90% of the organisms being studied
- D-value (meteorology) in meteorology refers to the deviation of actual altitude along a constant pressure surface from the standard atmosphere altitude of that surface.
- D-value (transport) - a rating in kN that is typically attributed to mechanical couplings
- Cohen's d in statistics - The expected difference between the means between an experimental group and a control group, divided by the expected standard deviation. It is used in estimations of necessary sample sizes of experiments.
- d', a sensitivity index.
