= Go Jun Bong-class tank landing ship =

Ship class

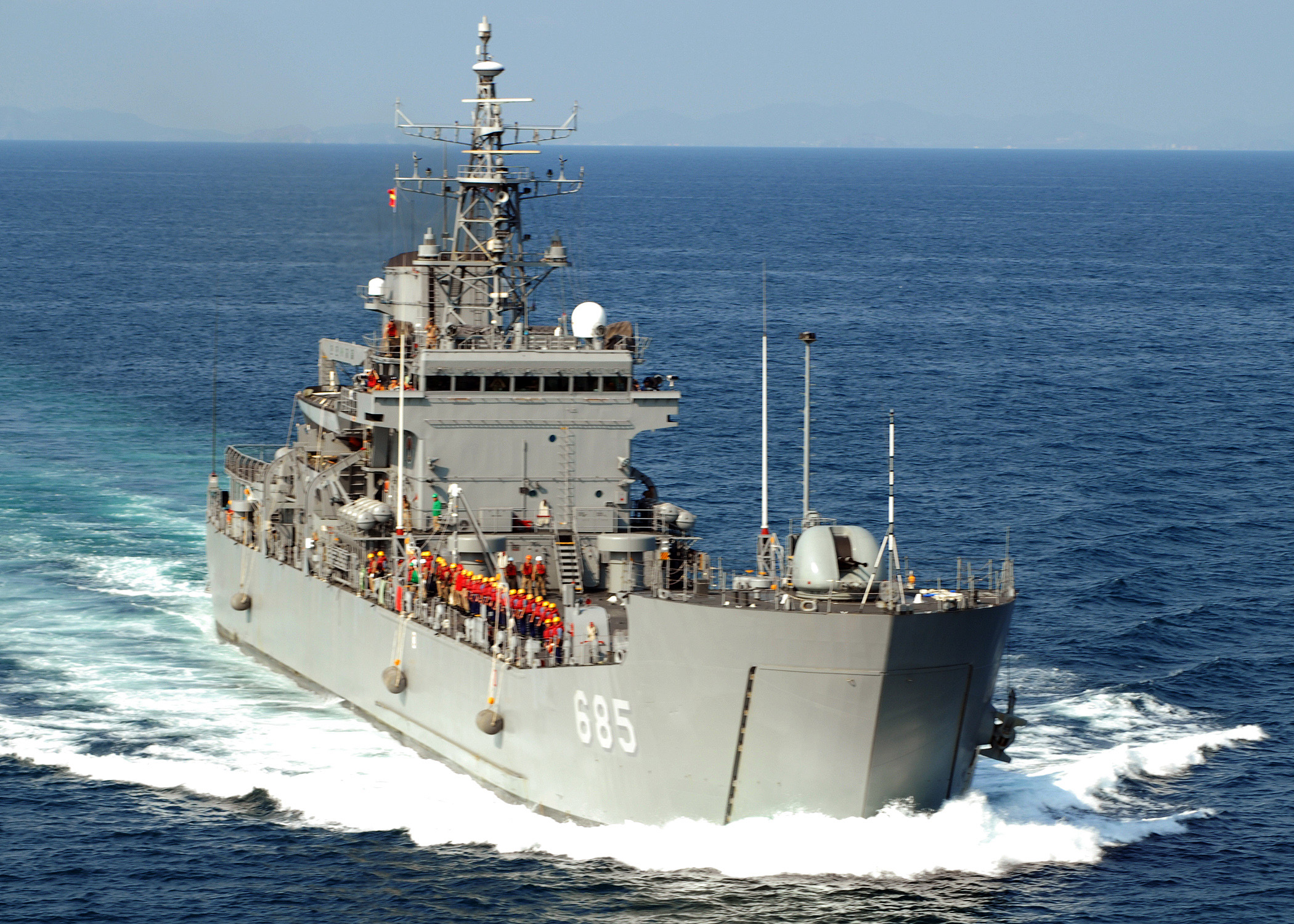
- ROKS Sung In Bong on 3 February 2010

Class overview
- Builders: Hanjin Heavy Industries
- Operators: Republic of Korea Navy
- Preceded by: Un Bong class
- Succeeded by: Cheon Wang Bong class
- Built: 1991 - 1996
- In service: 1994 - present
- In commission: 1994 - present
- Completed: 4
- Active: 4

General characteristics
- Type: Landing Ship, Tank
- Displacement: 2,600 tons (empty) / 4,300 tons (full)
- Length: 112.7 m (370 ft)
- Beam: 15.4 m (51 ft)
- Draught: 3.1 m (10 ft)
- Installed power: 12,800 hp (9,500 kW)
- Propulsion: 2 × SEMT Pielstick 16 PA6V 280 diesel engines
- Speed: 16 knots (30 km/h; 18 mph) maximum; 12 knots (22 km/h; 14 mph) cruising
- Range: 4,500 nmi (8,300 km; 5,200 mi)
- Capacity: 258 marines; 12 tanks; 14 amphibious assault vehicles; 8 2.5ton trucks; 4 LCVP
- Crew: 121
- Sensors & processing systems: Raytheon SPS-54 radar
- Armament: 4 × Emerlec 30mm (LST-681); or; 4 × 40mm Breda L/70K (LST-682, LST-683, LST-685); 2 × Vulcan 20 mm Gatling
- Aircraft carried: 1 × UH-60 helicopter
- Aviation facilities: Aft helicopter deck

Go Jun Bong-class tank landing ship (Hangul: 고준봉급 전차상륙함, Hanja: 孤準峰級戰車上陸艦) is an amphibious landing ship class of the Republic of Korea Navy.

== Development ==
In the late 1980s the Republic of Korea Navy decided to gradually replace its aging fleet of WW2 era LST-542-class tank landing ships (renamed Un Bong class) bought from the US Navy in 1958. A three phase plan was laid out to develop new landing ships to meet the demands of modern amphibious and transport operations.

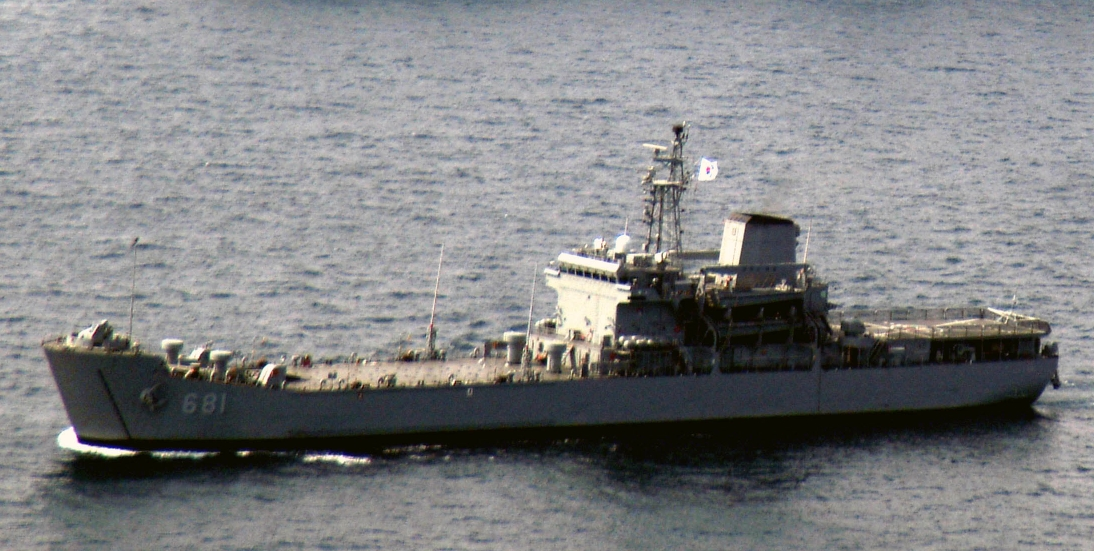
ROKS Go Jun Bong (LST-681) during an exercise off coast of Republic of Korea

The first phase was designated as the LST-I project, and development and design started in 1987 by Korea Tacoma, currently Hanjin Heavy Industries. After 4 years of development, the lead ship Go Jun Bong (LST-681) was launched in 1991. Three more ships followed and all four ships were commissioned by 1998.

The second phase, or LST-II, was originally planned to import four Newport-class tank landing ships, but after being postponed due to budget issues, it was changed in favor for domestic built 4500 ton LPDs to be commissioned by 2013–2016. These ships will ultimately replace the Un Bong class and Go Jun Bong-class tank landing ships.

LST-III was to build two mid-size helicopter amphibious landing ships, and designing started in 1997. In 2001 it was renamed as the LPX project and a total of two 14,300 ton ships were ordered for the Republic of Korea Navy. On July 3, 2007, the lead ship Dokdo was commissioned.

== Design ==
Go Jun Bong-class tank landing ship is based on the design of the LST-542 class, and thus its exterior is very similar to the Un Bong class.

The ship is designed to land multiple personnel, tanks and equipment simultaneously with doors and ramps placed on both the stern and bow of the ship, unlike the Un Bong class which only has doors on the bow. It is also equipped with a turn table, saving time when loading or landing vehicles. There is also a ramp for moving trucks up to the deck, and multiple elevators for rapid cargo loading.

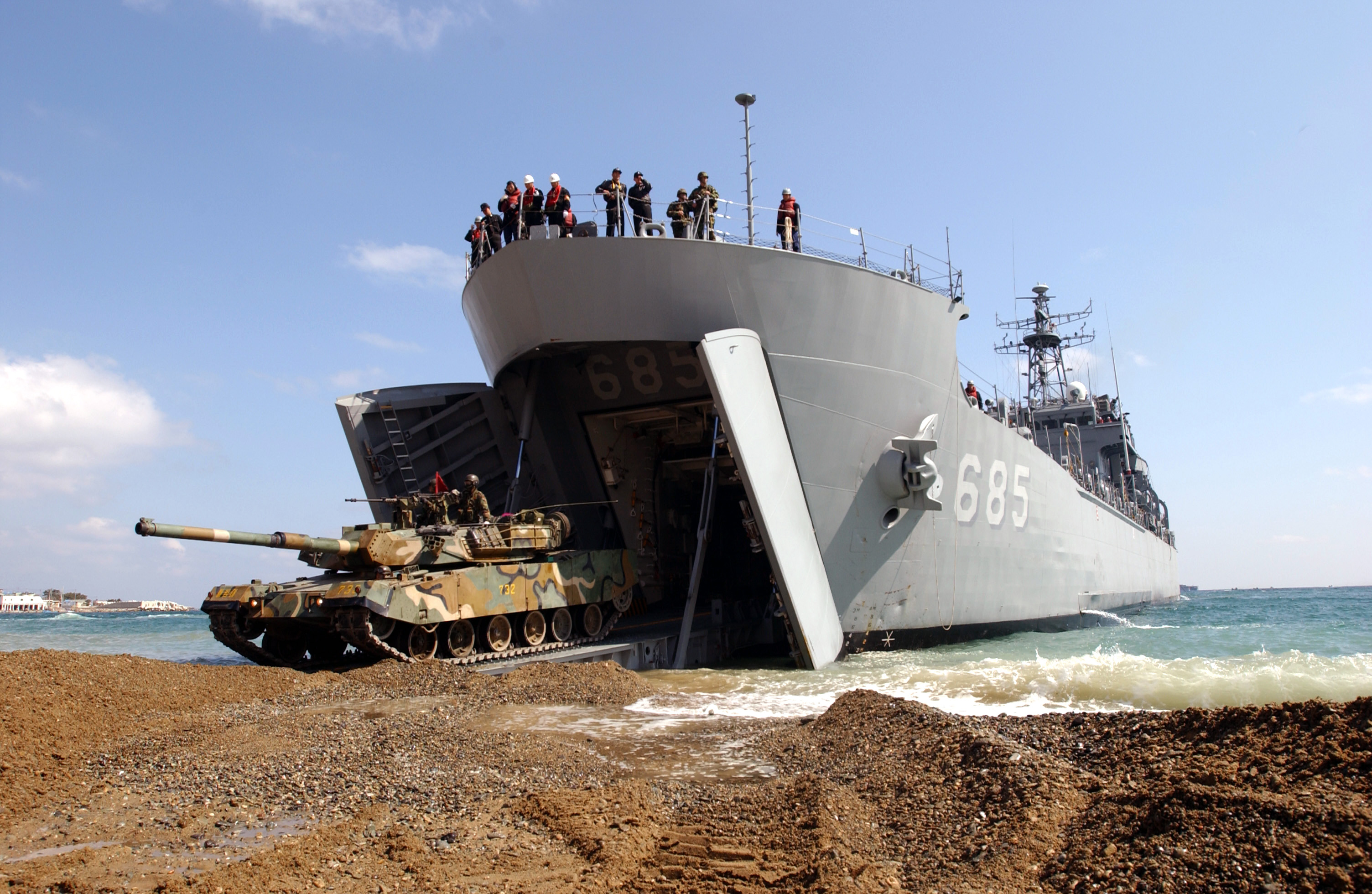
K1 MBT driving off ROKS Seong In Bong (LST-685) during Foal Eagle 2004

| Hull no. | Name | Launched | Commissioned |
|---|---|---|---|
| LST-681 | Go Jun Bong (고준봉) | 1991 | 1994 |
| LST-682 | Bi Ro Bong (비로봉) | 1995 | 1998 |
| LST-683 | Hyang Ro Bong (향로봉) | 1996 | 1999 |
| LST-685 | Sung In Bong (성인봉) | 1996 | 1999 |

== See also ==
Equivalent landing ships of the same era

- Type 072A
- Shardul class
