= Cheon Wang Bong-class landing ship =

South Korean ship class

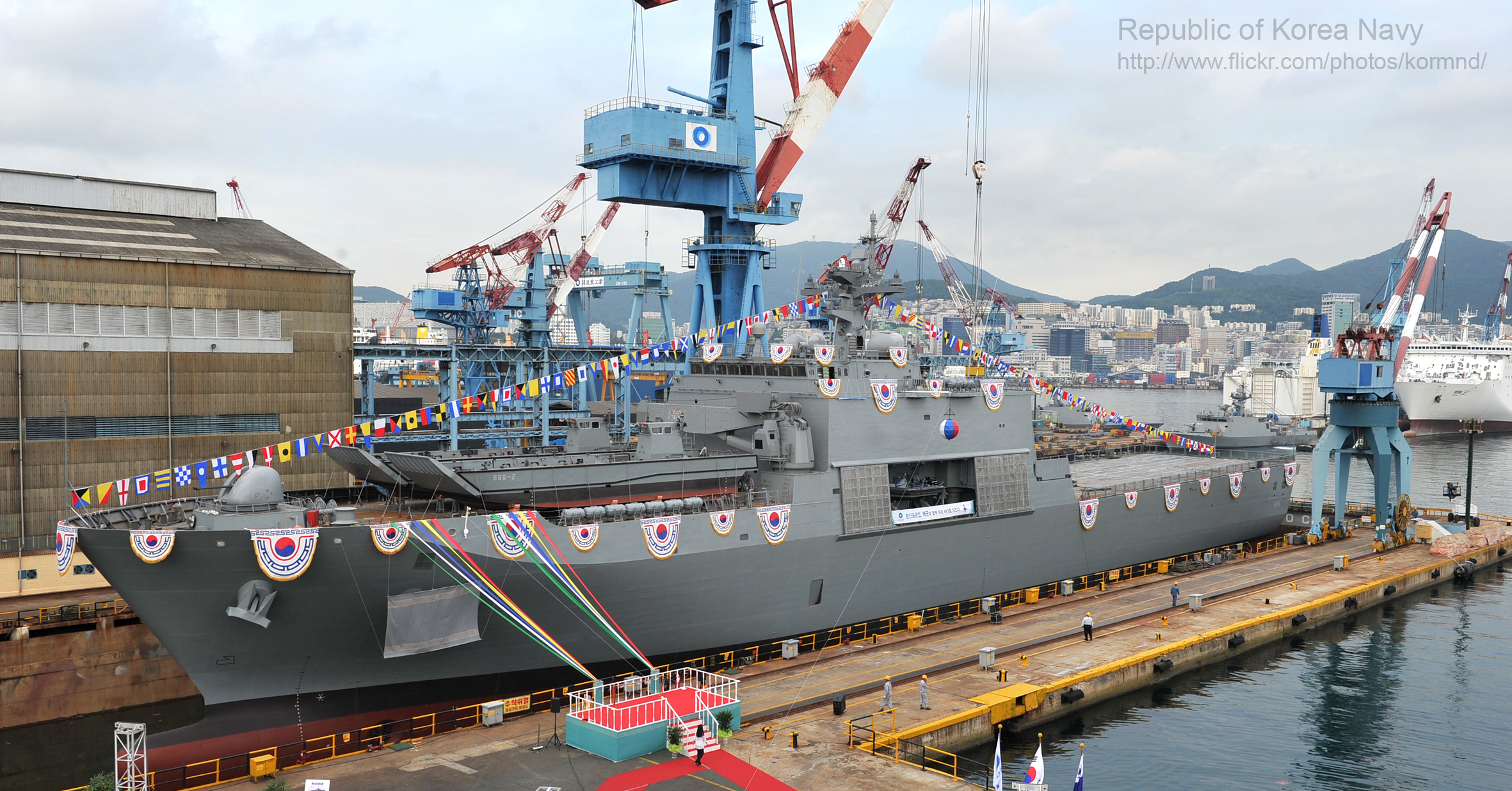
- ROKS Cheon Wang Bong during her launching

Class overview
- Name: Cheon Wang Bong class
- Builders: Hanjin Heavy Industries, Hyundai Heavy Industries
- Operators: Republic of Korea Navy
- Preceded by: Go Jun Bong class
- Built: 2014 -
- In service: 2014 - present
- In commission: 2014 - present
- Planned: 4
- Completed: 4
- Active: 4

General characteristics
- Type: Landing Ship, Tank
- Tonnage: 4,950 tons (empty) / 7,140 tons (full)
- Length: 126.9 m (416 ft)
- Beam: 19.4 m (64 ft)
- Draught: 5.4 m (18 ft)
- Installed power: 12,800 hp (9,500 kW)
- Propulsion: CODAD, 4 × MAN 12V28/33D STC diesel engines rated at 5460 kW, 4 x 6L21/31 auxiliary engines rated 1,200 kW
- Speed: 23 knots (43 km/h; 26 mph) maximum; 18 knots (33 km/h; 21 mph) cruising
- Range: 8,000 nmi (15,000 km; 9,200 mi)
- Boats & landing craft carried: 2 x LCM
- Troops: 300
- Crew: 120
- Sensors & processing systems: STX RadarSys SPS-100K surface search radar; LIG Nex1 SPS-540K surveillance 3D radar
- Electronic warfare & decoys: LIG Nex1 SLQ-200K Sonata electronic warfare suite, Rheinmetall MASS decoy system
- Armament: 1 × Hanwha Defense Systems (formerly Doosan DST) 'No Bong' twin 40mm gun; 4-cell K-VLS Compact Version for: Haegung K-SAAM quadpacked in 4 per cell
- Aviation facilities: Aft helicopter deck

The Cheon Wang Bong-class tank landing ship (Korean: 천왕봉급 전차상륙함; Hanja: 天王峰級戰車上陸艦) is an amphibious landing ship class of the Republic of Korea Navy.

== Development ==
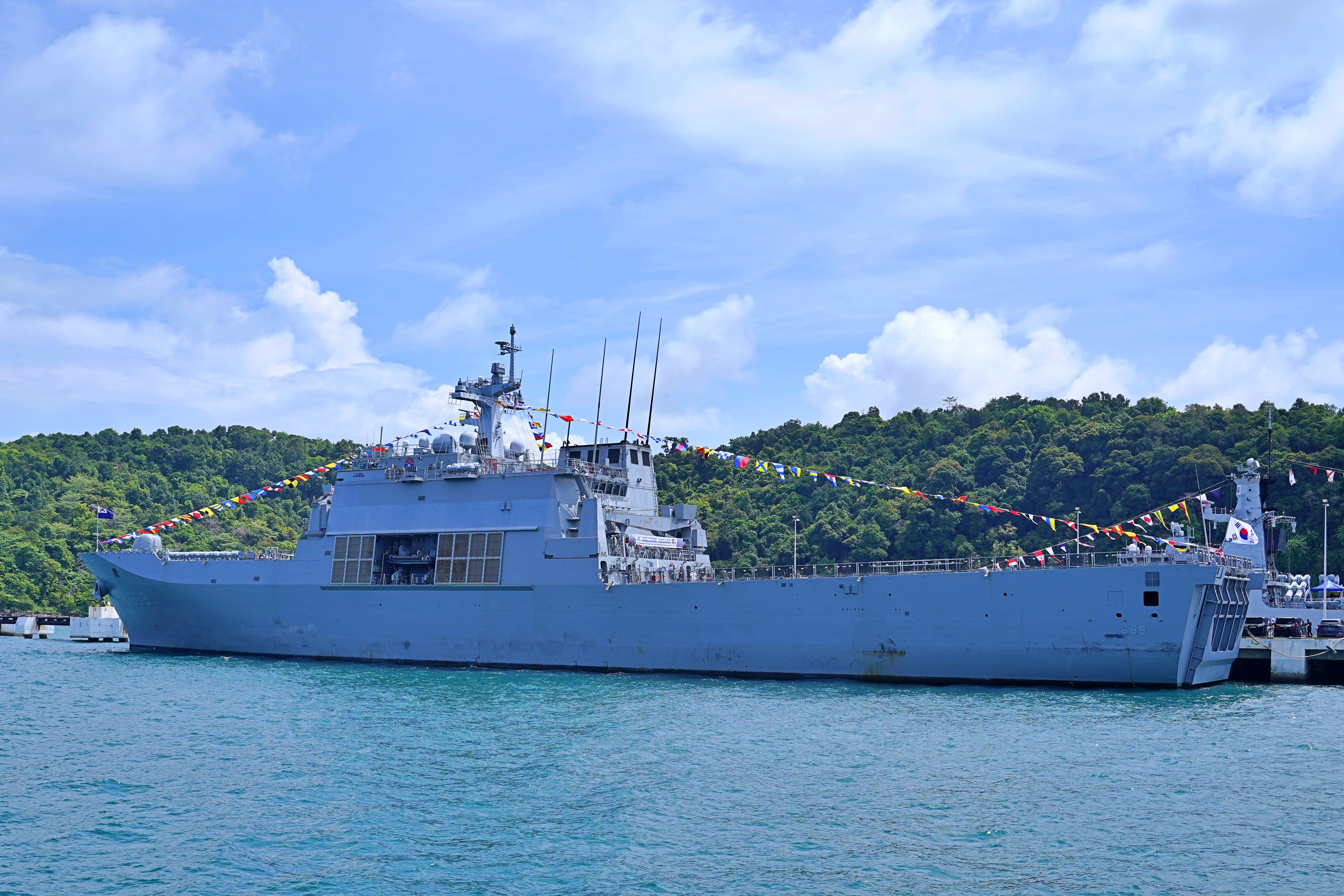
ROKS No Jeok Bong in Langkawi 2023

In the late 1980s the Republic of Korea Navy decided to gradually replace its aging fleet of World War II-era LST-542-class tank landing ships (renamed Un Bong-class LST) purchased from the US Navy in 1958. A three phase plan was laid out to develop new landing ships to meet the demands of modern amphibious and transport operations.

The first phase was designated as the LST-I project, and development and design started in 1987 by Korea Tacoma, currently Hanjin Heavy Industries. After 4 years of development, the lead ship Go Jun Bong (LST-681) was launched in 1991. Three more ships followed and all four ships were commissioned by 1998.

The second phase, or LST-II, was originally planned to import four Newport-class tank landing ships, but after being postponed due to budget issues, it was changed in favor for domestic built 4500-ton LPDs to be commissioned by 2013–2016. After the construction of the first vessel, a follow-on contract for four additional vessels were awarded to Hyundai Heavy Industries in December 2013.

== Ships in the class ==
Name	Pennant number	Builder	Launched	Commissioned	Decommissioned	Status
ROKS Cheon Wang Bong	LST-686	Hanjin Heavy Industries	11 September 2013	1 December 2014		Active
ROKS Cheon Ja Bong	LST-687	Hyundai Heavy Industries	15 December 2015	1 August 2017		Active
ROKS Il Chul Bong	LST-688	Hyundai Heavy Industries	25 October 2016	2 April 2018		Active
ROKS No Jeok Bong	LST-689	Hyundai Heavy Industries	2 November 2017	21 November 2018		Active

== See also ==
Equivalent landing ships of the same era

- Ivan Gren class
- Bayraktar class
- Shardul class
- Type 072A (Batch 2)
