= KIS Gwangje =

Second naval ship of the Korean Imperial Navy

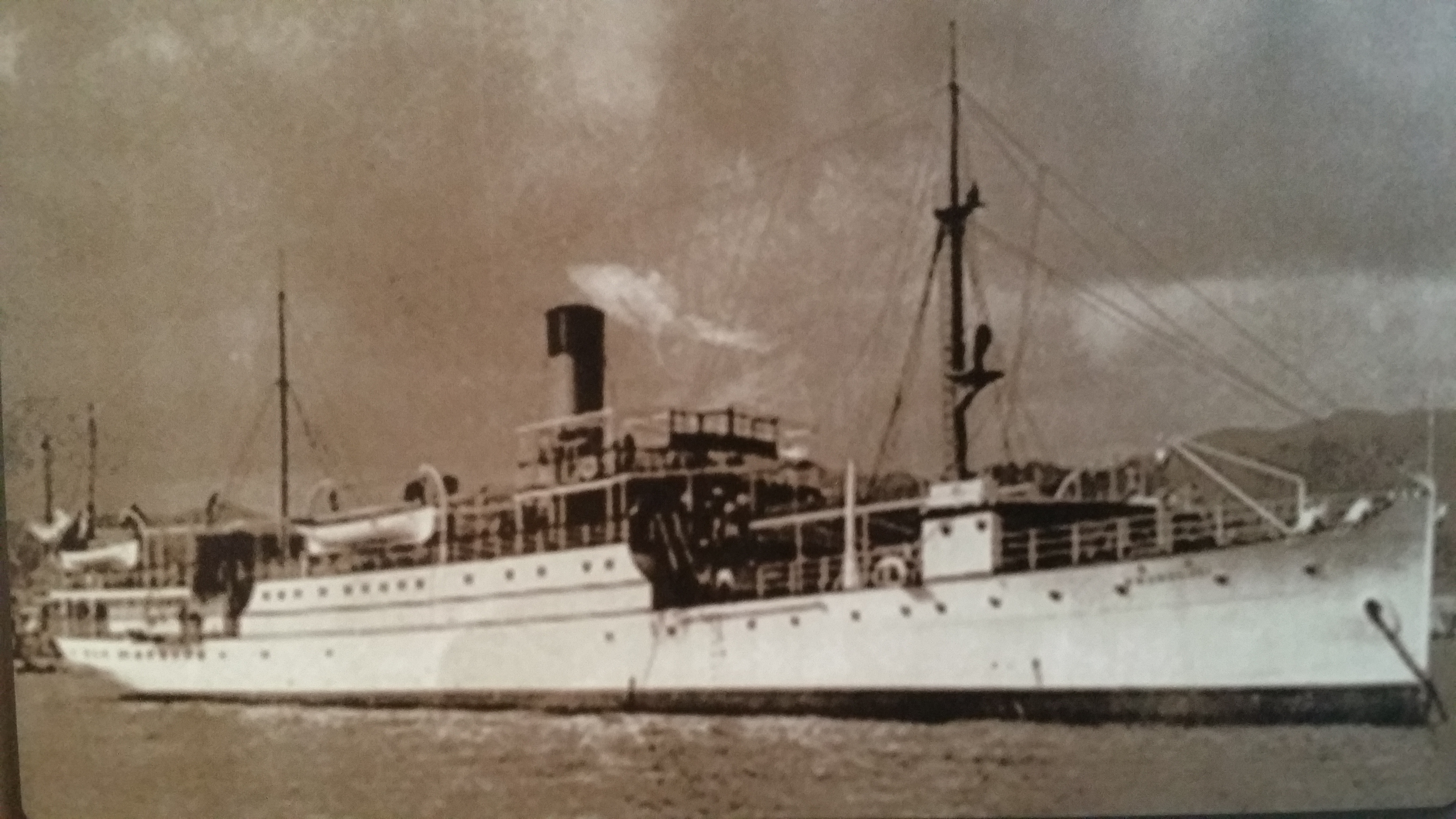
- Gwangje at sea

History
- Name: KIS Gwangje
- Builder: Kawasaki Shipbuilding Corporation
- Cost: 圓 350,000
- Completed: 1900
- Commissioned: November 1900
- Decommissioned: November 1905
- Fate: Unknown

General characteristics (as completed)
- Displacement: 1,056 long tons (1,073 t) (normal load)
- Length: 66.67 m (218.7 ft)
- Beam: 9.09 m (29.8 ft)
- Draught: 6.36 m (20.9 ft), 9.03 m (29.6 ft) deep load
- Installed power: 2,483 shp (1,852 kW)
- Propulsion: steam
- Speed: 14.77 knots (27.35 km/h; 17.00 mph)
- Complement: 100
- Armament: 3 × 1 3 inch naval guns

KIS Gwangje (Korean: 광제호; Hanja: 廣濟號) was the second naval ship of the Korean Imperial Navy. It was operated by the Korean Empire. The first ship, the KIS Yangmu, was inefficient as the ship was previously a cargo ship. The Gwangje's captain was Sin Sun-seong, who studied naval science in Tokyo, Japan. The ship was forced to decommission by the Japan–Korea Treaty of 1905. It was finally used for transportation of coals from 1941 until Korea was freed from Japan.
