= D-value (transport) =

In transport, D-value is a rating in kN that is typically attributed to mechanical couplings, and reflects dynamic loading limits between a towing vehicle and a trailer. The corresponding formula for a truck and trailer combination, used to determine the required D-value of a coupling, is:

T = Weight of towing vehicle including the vertical load on the fifth wheel
R = Total weight of the loaded semi-trailer
U = Vertical load on the fifth wheel
g = Acceleration due to gravity (assumed to be 9.81 m/s 2 )

D (kN) = g x ((0.6 x T x R)/(T + R - U))
