= KIS Yangmu =

First naval ship of the Korean Imperial Navy

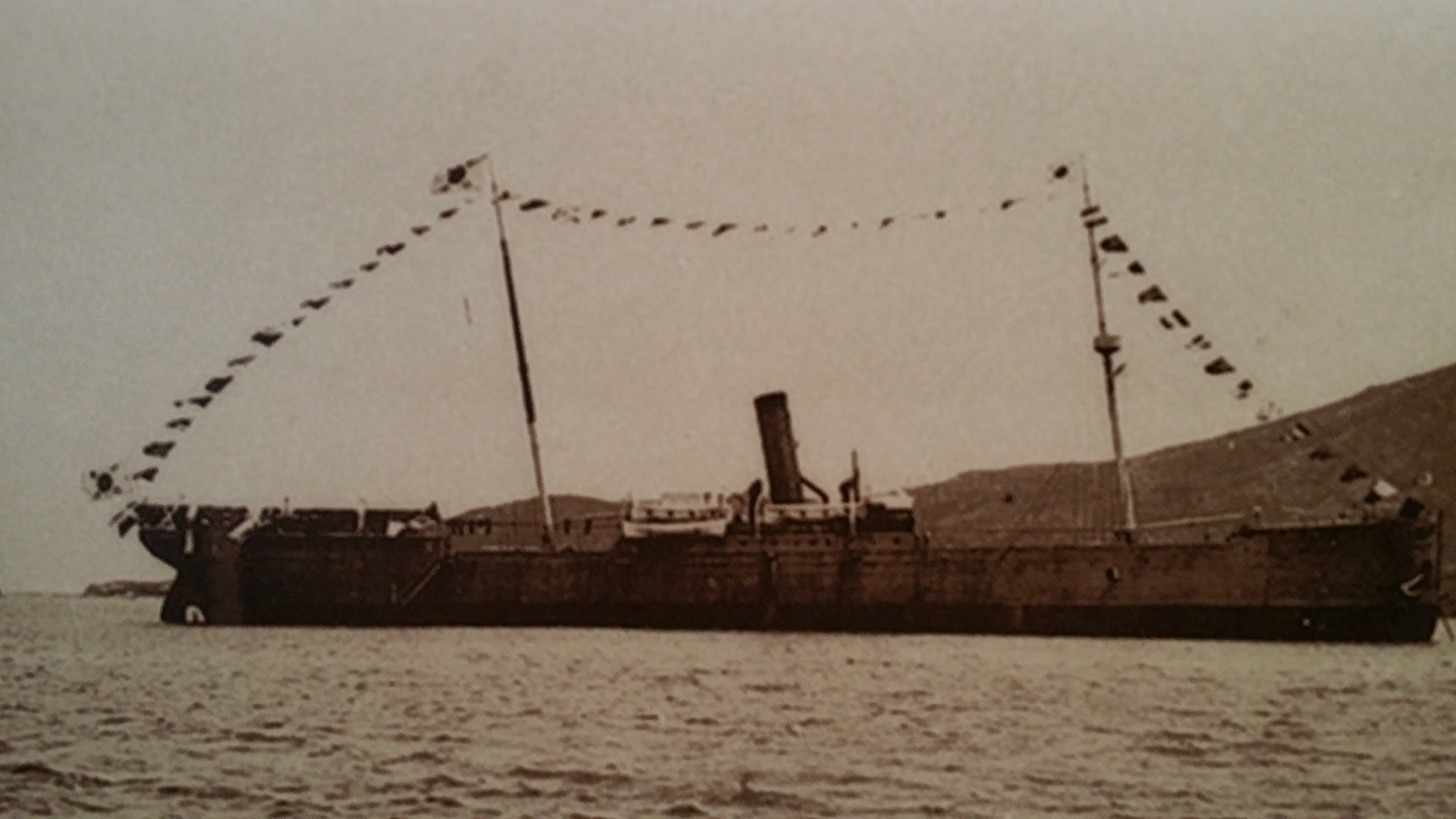
- The Korean Imperial Ship, Yangmu

History

Korean Empire
- Name: KIS Yangmu
- Builder: Sir Raylton Dixon & Co
- Cost: 圓 1,100,000
- Launched: 1888
- Completed: 1888
- Commissioned: April 15, 1900
- Decommissioned: 1907
- Fate: Selected by Imperial Japanese Navy to be used as practical exercise for new sailors during the Russo-Japanese War.

General characteristics (as completed)
- Type: Lighthouse tender
- Displacement: 3,432 long tons (3,487 t) (normal load)
- Length: 105 m (344.5 ft)
- Beam: 12.5 m (41.0 ft)
- Draught: 4.2 m (13.8 ft), 7.3 m (24.0 ft) deep load
- Installed power: 1,750 shp (1,300 kW)
- Propulsion: steam
- Speed: 13.5 knots (25.0 km/h; 15.5 mph)
- Complement: 72
- Armament: 4 × 1 80mm naval guns; 4 × 1 47mm naval guns

KIS Yangmu (Korean: 양무호; Hanja: 揚武號) was the first ship of the Korean Imperial Navy. It was built by Sir Raylton Dixon & Co and named "SS Pallas". This ship launched on 1888 and used in Clark George Ltd, Sunderland. In 1893, this ship was sold to the Japan's Mitsui Corporation, and Named "Kachidate Maru". In 1900, it was purchased by the Korean empire from Mitsui Corporation for 1,100,000 Korean Won, or 550,000 Japanese Yen. This was about 30% of the total military budget of the Korean Empire. The ship, however, was not very effective because of its previous use as a cargo ship. For the reasons above, a better ship was constructed – the KIS Gwangje.
