= HJ Shipbuilding & Construction =

South Korean shipbuilding company

HJ Shipbuilding & Construction Company, Ltd.
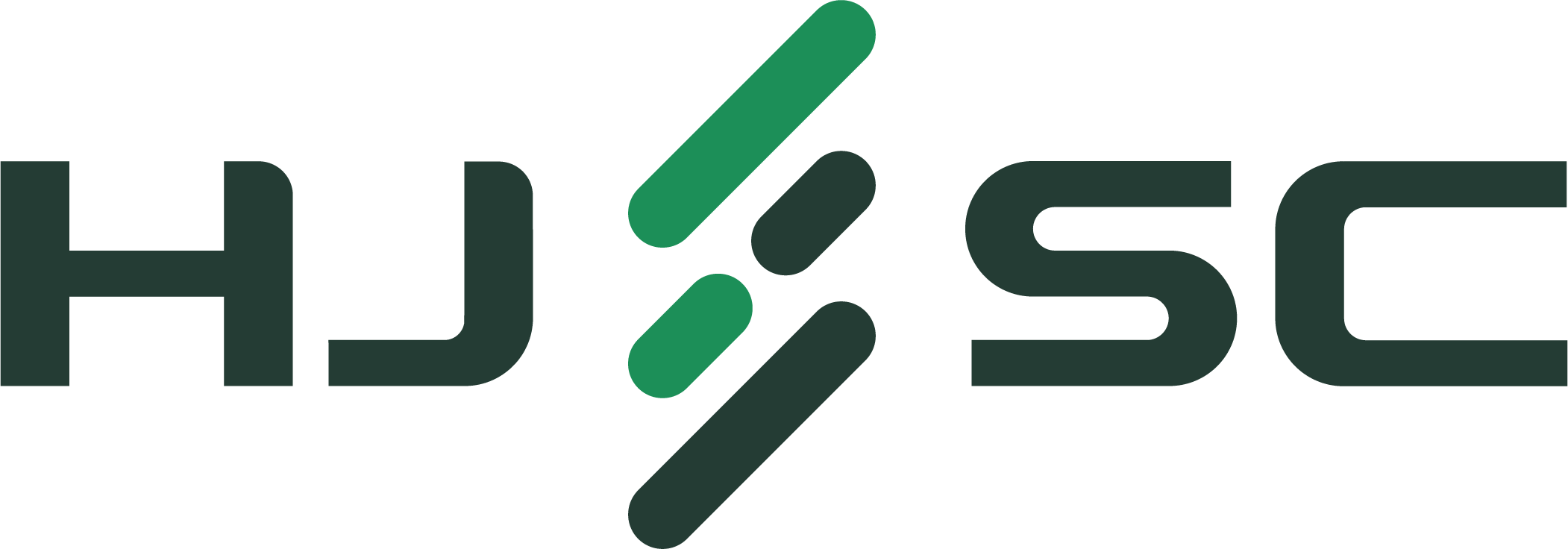
- Native name: HJ중공업
- Formerly: Chosun Heavy Industries (1937–1949); Korea Shipbuilding & Engineering (1949–1990); Hanjin Heavy Industries & Construction (1990–2021)
- Type: Public
- Traded as: KRX: 097230
- Industry: Construction; Defense; Shipbuilding
- Founded: July 1937; 88 years ago
- Headquarters: 233, Taejong-ro, Yeongdo-gu, Busan-si, Gyeongsangnam-do, South Korea
- Area served: Worldwide
- Key people: Kim Wan-sug (Construction Business CEO); Yoo Sang-cheol (Shipbuilding Business CEO)
- Products: Air-cushioned landing crafts; Cable layers; Container ships; Gas carriers; icebreakers; LNG carriers; Naval ships; Patrol boats; Plants; Suspension bridges
- Revenue: ▼ ₩1.8860 trillion (2024)
- Operating income: ▲ ₩7.3 billion (2024)
- Net income: ▲ ₩5.2 billion (2024)
- Total assets: ▼ ₩2.2044 trillion (2024)
- Total equity: ▲ ₩343.4 billion (2024)
- Owner: Echoprime Marine Pacific (62.43%); Employee stock ownership (0.23%); Treasury Stocks (0.01%); Other (0.04%)
- Number of employees: 2,569 (March 2014)
- Parent: Hanjin (1989–2005); Haemoro Group (2021–present)
- Website: Official website in English; Official website in Korean

- HJ Shipbuilding & Construction
- Hangul: HJ중공업
- Hanja: HJ重工業
- RR: HJ junggongeop
- MR: HJ chunggongŏp

Hanjin Heavy Industries & Construction logo

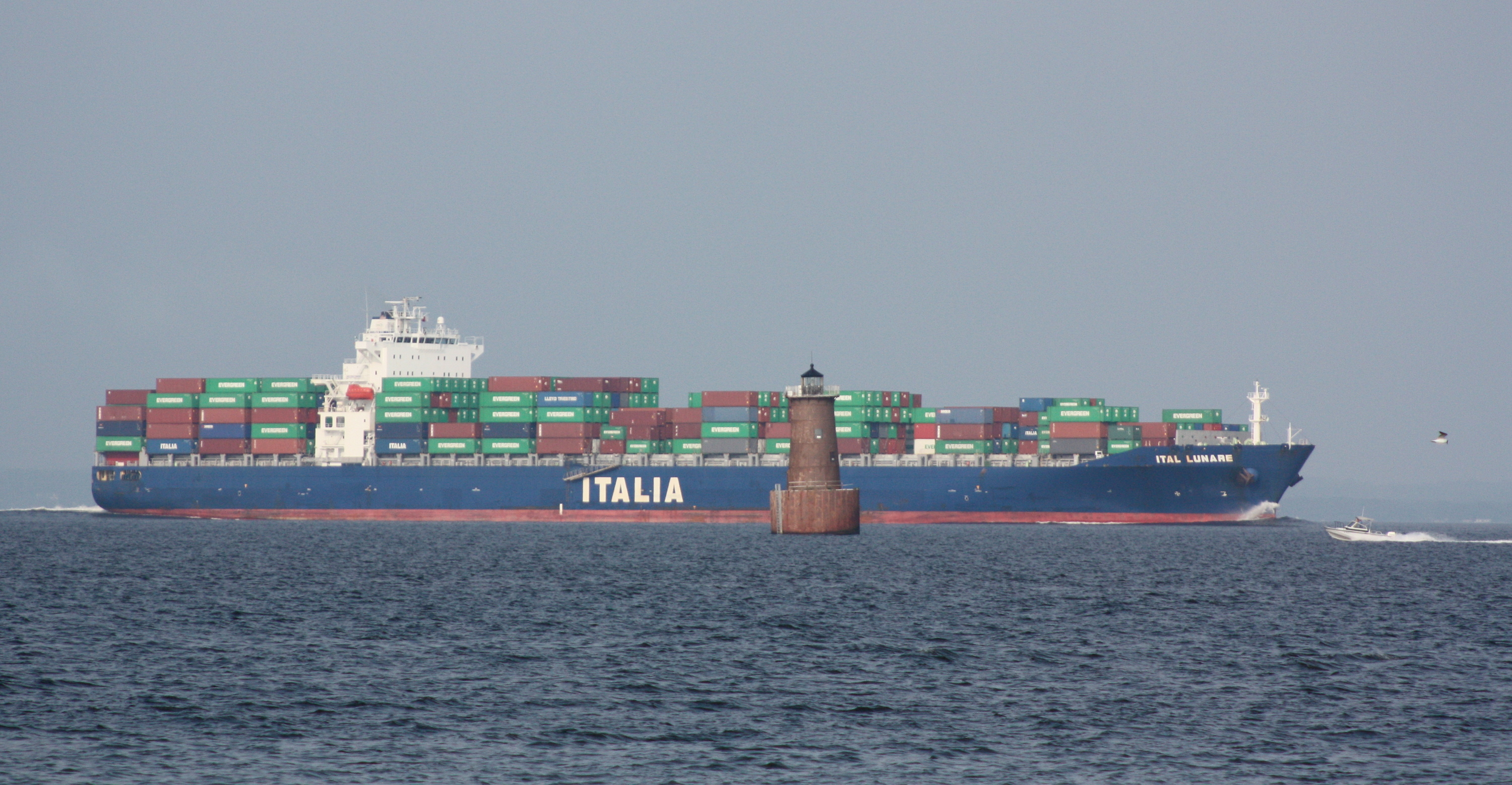
Container ship Ital Lunare was built by Hanjin Heavy Industries in 2007

HJ Shipbuilding & Construction Company, Ltd. (Korean: 주식회사 HJ중공업; Hanja: 株式會社HJ重工業), formerly Korea Shipbuilding & Engineering Corporation (대한조선공사; 大韓造船公社) and Hanjin Heavy Industries & Construction Co. Ltd. (주식회사 한진중공업; 株式會社韓進重工業), is a South Korean-based multinational shipbuilding company, founded in 1937 as Chosun Heavy Industries Co., Ltd. (조선중공업 주식회사; 朝鮮重工業株式會社).

== Scandals ==
On 7 July, thousands of protesters clashed with the police in a demonstration against layoffs in Yeong-do, Busan, and police fired water cannon with diluted tear-water solution on the crowds after warning the crowds to disperse on the streets.

In late September 2020, the Korea Development Bank (KDB), the main creditor and largest shareholder, announced it would sell all or part of its stake in HHIC. KDB owns 83.45 percent of shares in HHIC. On December 14, 2020, KDB announced that Dongbu Construction, Keithton Partners, and SM Merchant Marine are bidding to acquire HHIC.

In July 2021, the company announced that it had completed the second ship of the Dokdo-class amphibious assault ship for the Republic of Korea Navy, named the ROKS Marado.

== Ships built ==
- Container ships
  - 1 Ital Lunare
- Surface naval
  - 2 of 9 Ulsan-class frigates
  - 12 of 24 Pohang-class corvettes
  - 2 of 4 Donghae-class corvettes
- Amphibious warfare ships
  - 2 of 2 Dokdo-class amphibious assault ships
  - 1 of 4 Cheon Wang Bong-class landing ships
  - 4 of 4 Go Jun Bong-class landing ships
  - 4 of 8 Solgae 631-class air-cushioned landing crafts
- Patrol vessels
  - 24 of 34 Yoon Youngha-class patrol vessels
  - 17 of 17 Chamsuri-class patrol boats
- Auxiliary ships
  - 3 of 3 Mulgae 87-class landing Crafts
  - 3 of 9 Mulgae 79-class landing Crafts

== Corporate governance ==
=== Ownership ===
Major shareholders as of 2025
Shareholder	Country	Stake (%)
Echoprime Marine Pacific	South Korea	62.43%
Hanjin Heavy Industries & Construction Employee stock ownership	South Korea	0.23%
Deok-Geun Park	South Korea	0.2%
Treasury Stocks	South Korea	0.1%
Cheol-Sang Jung	South Korea	0.1%
Gwang-Mok Sohn	South Korea	0.1%

== See also ==
- Hanjin Group
- Hanjin Philippines shipyard (HHIC Phil)
- List of shipbuilders and shipyards
