= Helicopter deck =

Helicopter landing pad on a ship's deck

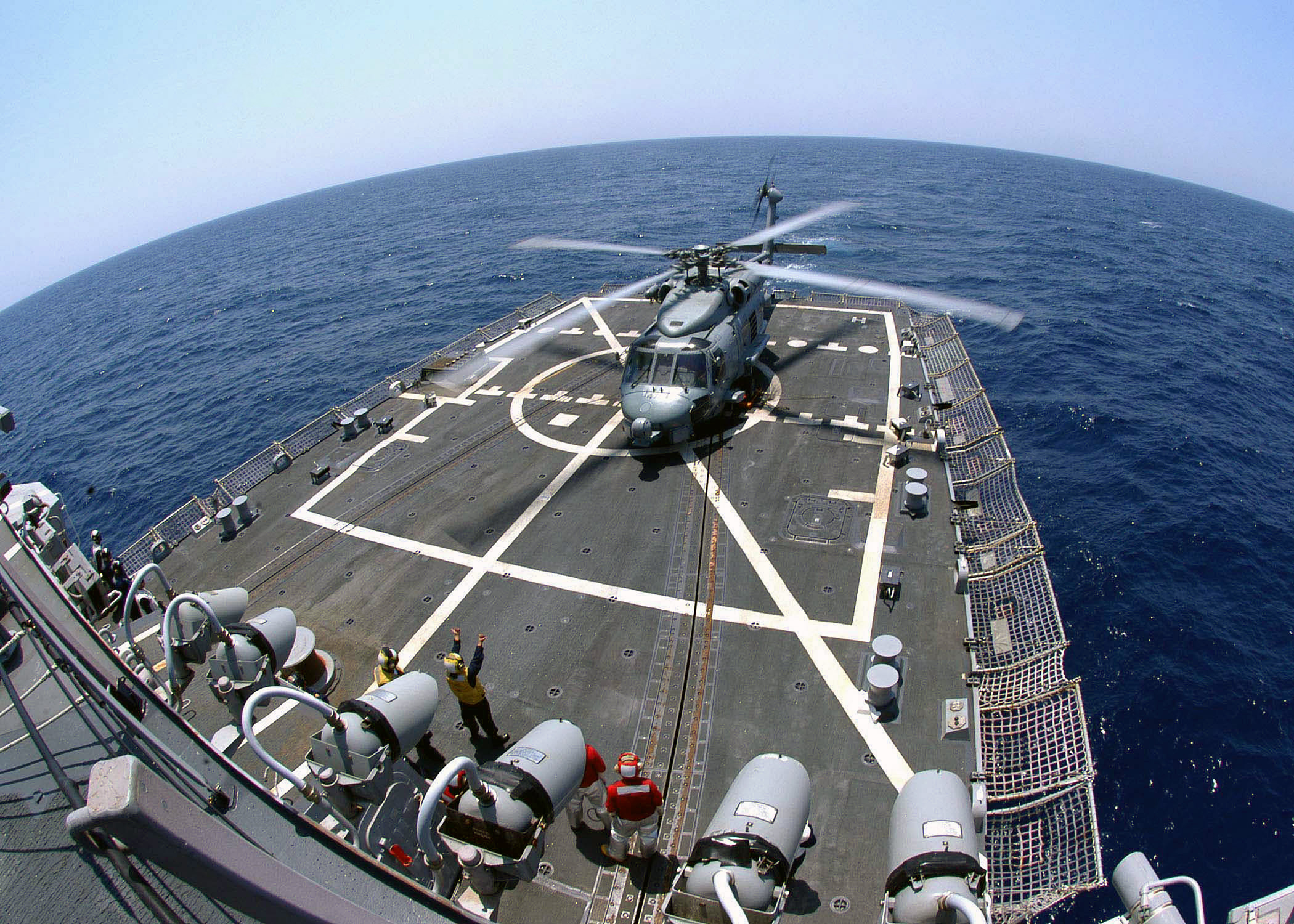
A U.S. Navy SH-60 Sea Hawk helicopter prepares to lift off from the flight deck of an Arleigh Burke-class destroyer

A helicopter deck (or helo deck) is a helicopter pad on the deck of a ship, usually located on the stern and always clear of obstacles that would prove hazardous to a helicopter landing. In the United States Navy, it is commonly and properly referred to as the flight deck.

In the UK's Fleet Air Arm, landing on is usually achieved by first lining up on the port quarter parallel to the ship's heading, then once the deck motion is deemed to be acceptable the pilot sidesteps the aircraft laterally using a white painted line (the bum line) as a reference.

Shipboard landing for some helicopters is assisted though use of a haul-down device that involves attachment of a cable to a probe on the bottom of the aircraft prior to landing. Tension is maintained on the cable as the helicopter descends, assisting the pilot with accurate positioning of the aircraft on the deck; once on deck locking beams close on the probe, locking the aircraft to the flight deck. This device was pioneered by the Royal Canadian Navy and was called "Beartrap". The U.S. Navy implementation of this device, based on Beartrap, is called the "RAST" system (for Recovery Assist, Secure and Traverse) and is an integral part of the LAMPS Mk III (SH-60B) weapons system.

A secondary purpose of the haul-down device is to equalize electrostatic potential between the helicopter and ship. The whirling rotor blades of a helicopter can cause large electrical charges to build up on the airframe, large enough to cause injury to shipboard personnel should they touch any part of the helicopter as it approaches the deck. This was depicted in the 1990 film The Hunt for Red October, when Jack Ryan is flown out to a submarine by helicopter. Ryan is lowered to the submarine, but brushes the officer charged with trying to hook him who receives a minor injury.

Coaxial rotor helicopters in flight are highly resistant to side-winds, which makes them suitable for shipboard use, even without a rope-pulley landing system.

Marine and offshore helicopter decks on board offshore oil platforms and ships are typically regulated by the rules defined within CAP 437, which defines standards for the design, marking, and lighting of marine/offshore helicopter decks, and is produced by the Civil Aviation Authority. The largest marine helicopter decks will accommodate the Boeing CH-47 Chinook, which requires a D value of 30 metres (98 ft), and has a weight of 21.3 tons. More typical for vessels would be decks that will accommodate the Sikorsky S-92 with a D value of 21 metres (69 ft) and 11.9 tons.

== See also ==
- Naval aviation
- Helipad
