= KRI Teluk Ende =

Teluk Semangka-class landing ship tank

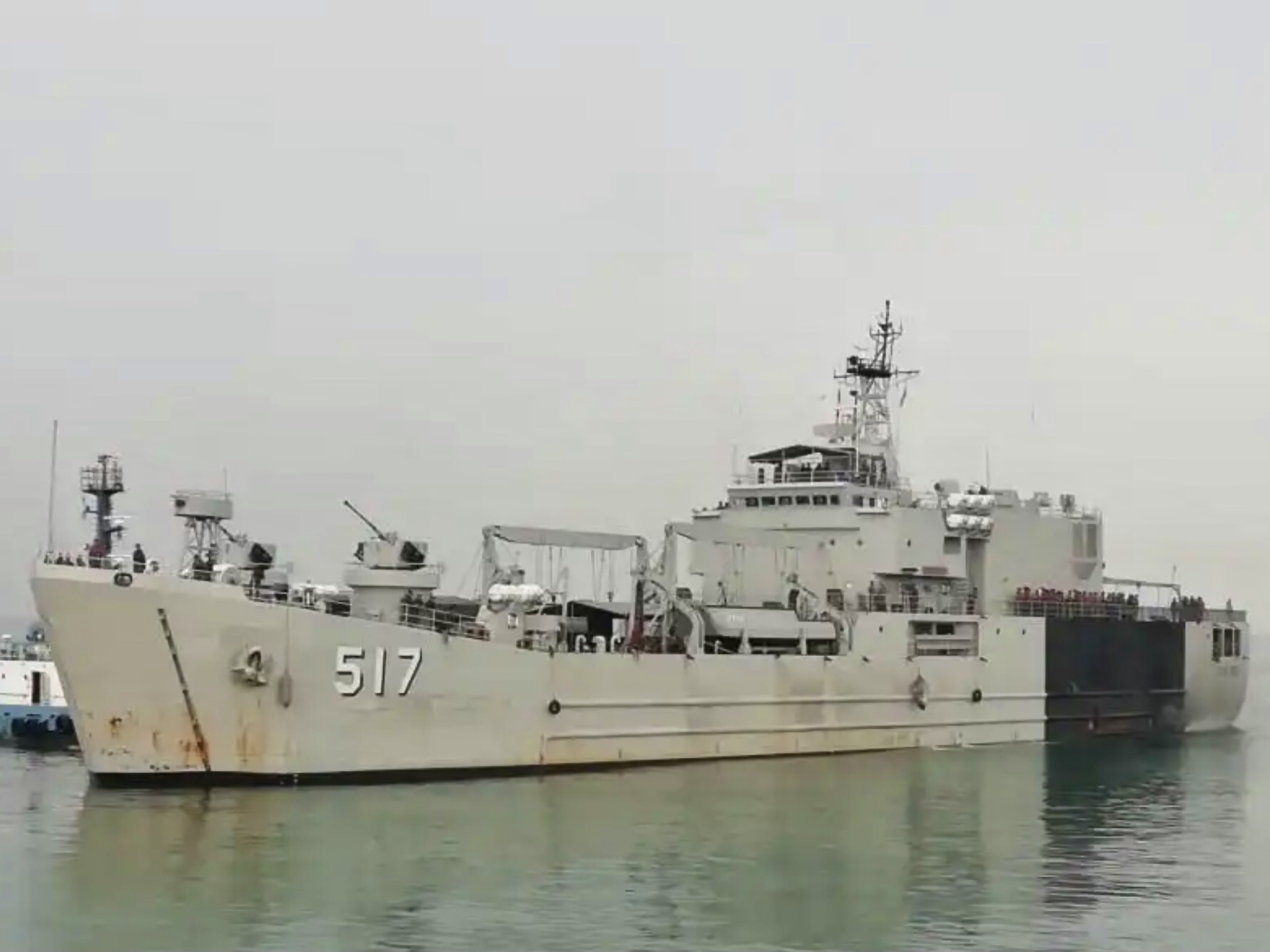
- KRI Teluk Ende at Sangatta in 2019

History

Indonesia
- Name: Teluk Ende
- Namesake: Ende Bay
- Ordered: June 1981
- Builder: Korea Tacoma Shipyard, Masan
- Launched: 1982
- Commissioned: 1 September 1982
- Identification: Pennant number: 517
- Status: Active

General characteristics
- Class & type: Teluk Semangka-class tank landing ship
- Displacement: 3,750 long tons (3,810 t) full
- Length: 100 m (330 ft)
- Beam: 14.4 m (47 ft)
- Draught: 4.2 m (14 ft)
- Propulsion: 2 × diesel engines 12,800 metric horsepower (9.4 MW); 2 × shafts, twin rudders
- Speed: 15 knots (28 km/h; 17 mph)
- Range: 7,500 nmi (13,900 km; 8,600 mi) at 13 knots (24 km/h; 15 mph)
- Boats & landing craft carried: 2 × LCVPs
- Capacity: 17 × main battle tanks; 1,800 t (1,772 long tons) cargo
- Troops: 200
- Complement: 90 (13 officers)
- Sensors & processing systems: Decca Radar, I band; Raytheon surface search radar, E/F band
- Armament: 2 x single Bofors 40 mm L/70; 2 x single Rheinmettal 20 mm; 2 x single DShK 12.7 mm
- Aircraft carried: 3 x AS332 Super Puma
- Aviation facilities: Helipad; Hangar

KRI Teluk Ende (517) is the sixth Teluk Semangka-class tank landing ship of the Indonesian Navy.

== Design ==
The ship has a length of 100 m (330 ft), a beam of 14.4 m (47 ft), with a draught of 4.2 m (14 ft) and her displacement is 3,750 long tons (3,810 t) at full load. She was powered by two diesel engines, with total sustained power output of 12,800 metric horsepower (9.4 MW) distributed in two shaft. Teluk Banten has a speed of 15 knots (28 km/h), with range of 7,500 nautical miles (13,900 km) while cruising at 13 knots (24 km/h).

Teluk Banten has a capacity of 200 troops, 1,800 long tons (1,800 t) of cargo (which includes 17 main battle tanks), and 2 LCVPs on davits. The ship has a complement of 90 personnel, including 13 officers. Teluk Banten is a command ship variant of the class and has distinguishing features such as the LCVP davits located forward of the bridge and the exhaust vents above the waterlines instead of funnels found on the other ships.

She was armed with two single Bofors 40 mm L/70 guns, two single Rheinmettal 20 mm autocannons, and two single DShK 12.7 mm heavy machine guns.

The ship has hangar facility and helicopter deck in the aft with provisions for up to 3 Eurocopter AS332 Super Puma helicopters.

== Construction and commissioning ==
Teluk Ende was built by Korea Tacoma Shipyard in Masan, ordered in June 1981. She was commissioned on 1 September 1982.

She was docked at the Trisakti Harbor pier on 15 October 2019, at 15.00 WITA for 3 days until 17 October 2019. The mission of this visit was to provide education and share experiences from AAL cadets on visits to schools. With the agenda of the visit, it was hoped that it will increase the motivation of the younger generation who have graduated from school in Banau, South Kalimantan so that they want to work and devote themselves to being Navy soldiers.

She carried hundreds of Navy level II cadets leaning against the port of Tanjung Bara, Sangatta, East Kutai Regency, East Kalimantan Province on 20 October 2019. On this mission, she took the cadets to carry out socialization in schools in the East Kutai Regency area.

She brought clean water assistance to Sapudi Island, Madura and docked at the Sapudi Island pier on 4 November 2019. The long dry season caused drought and made residents on Sapudi Island experience a clean water crisis, making it difficult for them to meet their daily needs. The dry conditions moved Koarmada II in collaboration with the Regional Disaster Management Agency (BPBD) of East Java to provide clean water assistance. In this mission, she brought members of the Sumenep Drought Disaster Management Task Force consisting of personnel from the Joint Fleet Task Force, Lantamal V and Lanal Batuporon, 1 SST Yonmarhanlan, East Java BPBD, Tagana and Satpol PP, which amounted to approximately 200 people, brought 2 units of material. The Bromo and Tambora Tug Boats as well as 1 unit of fresh water barge from Lantamal V, carried 3,000 - 5,000 jerry cans of clean water, each containing 25 liters of water, carrying three East Java BPDB water tankers, each carrying 50,000 liters of clean water.

== Gallery ==
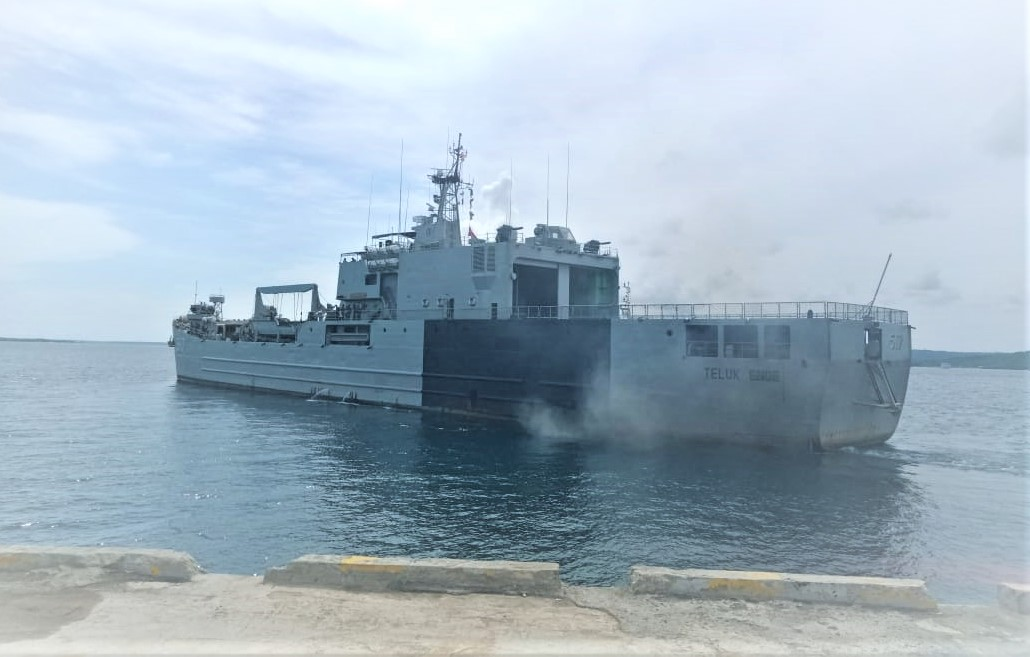
KRI Teluk Ende in Kupang in 2020

== Bibliography ==
- Gardiner, Robert; Chumbley, Stephen; Budzbon, Przemysław (1995). Conway's All the World's Fighting Ships 1947-1995. Annapolis, Maryland: Naval Institute Press. ISBN 9781557501325.
- Saunders, Stephen (2009). Jane's Fighting Ships 2009-2010. Jane's Information Group. ISBN 978-0710628886.
