= KRI Ki Hajar Dewantara =

Retired training corvette of Indonesian Navy

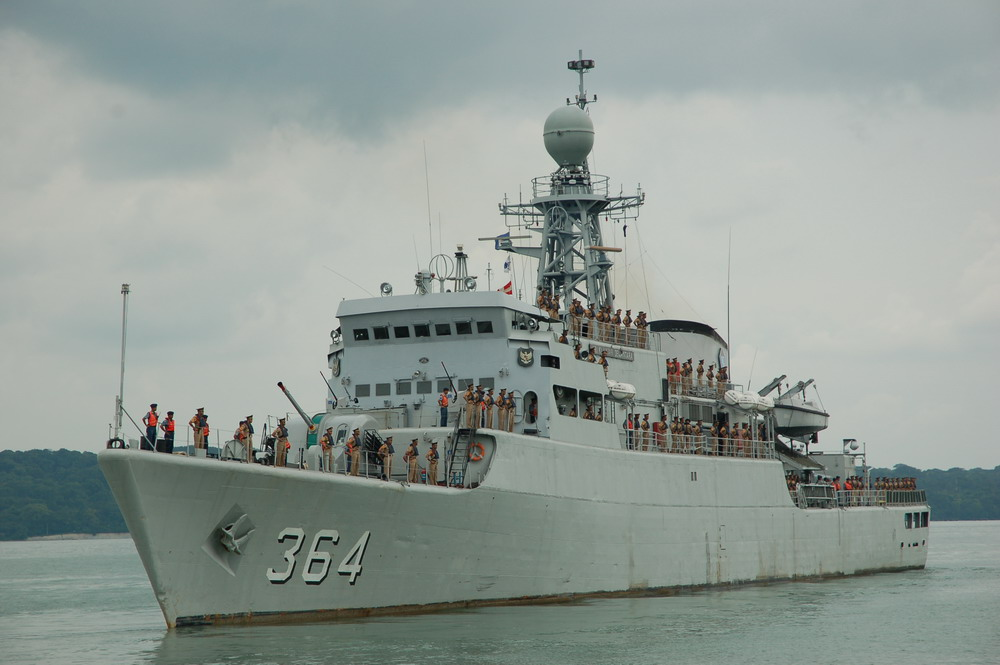
- KRI Ki Hajar Dewantara in 2008

History

Indonesia
- Name: Ki Hajar Dewantara
- Namesake: Ki Hajar Dewantara
- Ordered: 14 March 1978
- Builder: Split Shipyard, Split, Yugoslavia
- Yard number: 509
- Laid down: 11 May 1979
- Launched: 11 October 1980
- Commissioned: 31 October 1981
- Decommissioned: 16 August 2019
- Identification: Pennant number: 364
- Fate: Retired, awaiting disposal

General characteristics
- Class & type: Dewantara-class corvette
- Displacement: 2,050 long tons (2,080 t) full load
- Length: 96.7 m (317 ft)
- Beam: 11.2 m (37 ft)
- Draught: 4.8 m (16 ft)
- Propulsion: CODOG; 1 x Rolls-Royce Olympus TM3B gas turbine rated at 24,525 horsepower (18.288 MW); 2 x MTU 16V956 TB92 diesel engines rated at 11,070 metric horsepower (8.14 MW)
- Speed: 26 knots (48 km/h; 30 mph) on gas; 20 knots (37 km/h; 23 mph) on diesels
- Range: 4,000 nautical miles (7,400 km) at 18 knots (33 km/h)
- Boats & landing craft carried: 2 × LCVPs
- Complement: 89 crew, 14 instructor, 100 cadets
- Sensors & processing systems: Racal Decca AC1229 surface search radar; Signaal WM28 radar; Signaal SEWACO-RI central control system; Signaal PHS-32 hull mounted MF Sonar
- Electronic warfare & decoys: MEL Susie I ECM suite; 2 × 2 128 mm flare launchers
- Armament: Guns: 1 × Bofors 57 mm/70 Mk 1 gun 2 × 20 mm Rheinmetall Rh-202 20 mm autocannons; Missiles: 2 × 2 MM38 Exocet missile Mistral surface-to-air missile; Torpedoes: 2 × 533 mm (21 in) torpedo tubes for AEG SUT torpedo Depth charges
- Aircraft carried: 1 x NBO-105 or Westland Wasp helicopter
- Aviation facilities: Helipad

KRI Ki Hajar Dewantara (364) is a Dewantara-class training corvette of Indonesian Navy that was built in SFR Yugoslavia. The ship was built in 1980 and was decommissioned in 2019.

== Design and description ==
Ki Hajar Dewantara has a length of 96.7 m (317 ft), a beam of 11.2 m (37 ft), with a draught of 4.8 m (16 ft) and her displacement is 2,050 long tons (2,080 t) at full load. The ship was powered by combined diesel or gas propulsion, consisted of a Rolls-Royce Marine Olympus TM3B gas turbine with sustained power output of 24,525 horsepower (18.288 MW), and two MTU 16V 956TB92 diesel engines with sustained power output of 11,070 metric horsepower (8.14 MW), distributed in two shafts. She was also equipped with controllable pitch propeller. Her maximum speed are 26 knots (48 km/h) with gas turbine and 20 knots (37 km/h) with diesels. The ship had a range of 4,000 nautical miles (7,400 km) while cruising at 18 knots (33 km/h), or 1,150 nautical miles (2,130 km) at 25 knots (46 km/h).

The ship has a complement of 89 personnel, with the addition of 14 instructors and 100 cadets for training purpose. She was armed with two MM38 Exocet missile launchers with 4 missiles, one Bofors 57 mm L/70 Mk 1 naval gun, and two 20 mm Rheinmetall Mk 20 Rh-202 autocannons in single mount. Later in her service, the Navy mounted Mistral surface-to-air missile to bolster the ship's air defense. The ship also armed with two 533 millimetres (21.0 in) torpedo tubes for SUT torpedoes, a GM 101/41 depth charge projector, and two twin-tubed 128 mm flare launchers. Ki Hajar Dewantara has helipad in her stern and able to carry a helicopter. She also able to carry two LCVPs. As a training ship, she has classroom and additional bridge, navigation room, radio room, and accommodations.

== Construction and career ==
The ship was ordered on 14 March 1978 to Split Shipyard, SFR Yugoslavia. Her keel was laid down on 11 May 1979 and she was launched on 11 October 1980. She was initially named as KRI Hadjar Dewantoro. (Note: Old spelling of "Hajar Dewantara") She arrived in Indonesia in the autumn of 1981 and was commissioned on 31 October 1981.

In 1992, KRI Ki Hajar Dewantara, along with KRI Yos Sudarso and KRI Teluk Banten intercepted Portuguese ship Lusitania Expresso in East Timor. Col. Widodo, deputy assistant of the Indonesian Navy's Eastern Fleet, told Radio Republik Indonesia from aboard the Indonesian warship KRI Yos Sudarso that the ferry entered Indonesian waters at 5:28 in the morning of 11 March 1992. At 6:07, Lusitania Expresso had traveled two to three nautical miles (3.7 to 5.6 km; 2.3 to 3.5 mi) into Indonesian territory and Captain Luis Dos Santos (Lusitania Expresso's captain) was ordered to leave immediately. Col. Widodo said the Portuguese ship's captain obeyed the order and turned his ship around and headed back to sea.

The ship was out of service since mid 2017. Before being decommissioned, her 57 mm gun was dismounted to be reused for naval gunnery training at naval weapons range in Paiton, Probolinggo Regency, East Java. On 16 August 2019, Ki Hajar Dewantara along with KRI Slamet Riyadi, KRI Teluk Penyu, and three other Navy ships were decommissioned in a ceremony at 2nd Fleet Command HQ in Surabaya. In 2019, Surabaya municipal government planned to utilize her as maritime museum with restaurant and coffeehouse. She was planned to be placed at Kenjeran Beach. In 2022, Bali Tourism Board proposed the ship to be sunk as artificial reef off Buleleng Regency, Bali for tourism purpose.

The Indonesian government announced on 18 August 2026 that the retired vessel will be put up for sale.

== See also ==
- List of former ships of the Indonesian Navy

== Bibliography ==
- Moore, Capt. John (1984). Jane's Fighting Ships 1984-85. Jane's Information Group. ISBN 978-0710607959.
- Saunders, Stephen (2009). Jane's Fighting Ships 2009-2010. Jane's Information Group. ISBN 978-0710628886.
