= KRI Teluk Sampit =

Teluk Semangka-class landing ship tank

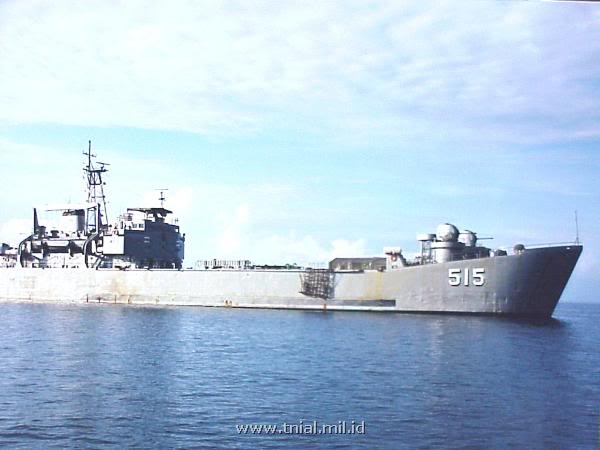
- KRI Teluk Sampit

History

Indonesia
- Name: Teluk Sampit
- Namesake: Sampit Bay, East Kotawaringin Regency
- Ordered: June 1979
- Builder: Korea Tacoma Shipyard, Masan
- Commissioned: June 1981
- Identification: Pennant number: 515
- Status: Active

General characteristics
- Class & type: Teluk Semangka-class tank landing ship
- Displacement: 3,750 long tons (3,810 t) full
- Length: 100 m (330 ft)
- Beam: 14.4 m (47 ft)
- Draught: 4.2 m (14 ft)
- Propulsion: 2 × diesel engines 12,800 metric horsepower (9.4 MW); 2 × shafts, twin rudders
- Speed: 15 knots (28 km/h; 17 mph)
- Range: 7,500 nmi (13,900 km; 8,600 mi) at 13 knots (24 km/h; 15 mph)
- Boats & landing craft carried: 2 × LCVPs
- Capacity: 17 × main battle tanks; 1,800 t (1,772 long tons) cargo
- Troops: 200
- Complement: 90 (13 officers)
- Sensors & processing systems: Decca Radar, I band
- Armament: 3 x single Bofors 40 mm L/70; 2 x single Rheinmettal 20 mm; 2 x single DShK 12.7 mm
- Aircraft carried: 1 x NBO-105
- Aviation facilities: Helipad

KRI Teluk Sampit (515) is the fourth Teluk Semangka-class tank landing ship in the Indonesian Navy.

== Design ==
The ship has a length of 100 m (330 ft), a beam of 14.4 m (47 ft), with a draught of 4.2 m (14 ft) and her displacement is 3,750 long tons (3,810 t) at full load. She is powered by two diesel engines, with total sustained power output of 12,800 metric horsepower (9.4 MW) distributed in two shaft. Teluk Sampit has a speed of 15 knots (28 km/h), with range of 7,500 nautical miles (13,900 km) while cruising at 13 knots (24 km/h).

Teluk Sampit has a capacity of 200 troops, 1,800 long tons (1,800 t) of cargo (which includes 17 main battle tanks), and 2 LCVPs on davits. The ship has a complement of 90 personnel, including 13 officers.

She is armed with three single Bofors 40 mm L/70 guns, two single Rheinmettal 20 mm autocannons, and two single DShK 12.7 mm heavy machine guns.

The ship has helicopter decks in the amidships and aft for small to medium helicopter such as Westland Wasp or MBB Bo 105.

== Construction and commissioning ==
Teluk Sampit was built by Korea Tacoma Shipyard in Masan, ordered in June 1979. She was commissioned in June 1981.

The ship transports Bawean residents that were stranded in Gresik for two weeks as their ferry ship, KM Harapanku Mekar, was damaged by the waves around Karang Jamuang Island, 20 miles north of Gresik, due to unbalanced cargo distribution. The transportation started on 23 February 2008 from 17.45 UTC+7 by carrying 585 adult passengers and 45 children, 7 motorbikes, and vegetables. The ship is expected to arrive at Bawean Island in about 13 – 14 hours at a speed of 11 knots or 22 kilometers per hour, starting from an estimated 17.00 until 07.00 the next day.

She landed in the city of Bima on 25 January 2018 and brought students and teachers to take part in learning about the warship on 26 January 2018. Students and teachers were given lessons and directions regarding the contents of the deck of the ship.

== Bibliography ==
- Saunders, Stephen (2009). Jane's Fighting Ships 2009-2010. Jane's Information Group. ISBN 978-0710628886.
