= KRI Teluk Banten =

Teluk Semangka-class landing ship tank

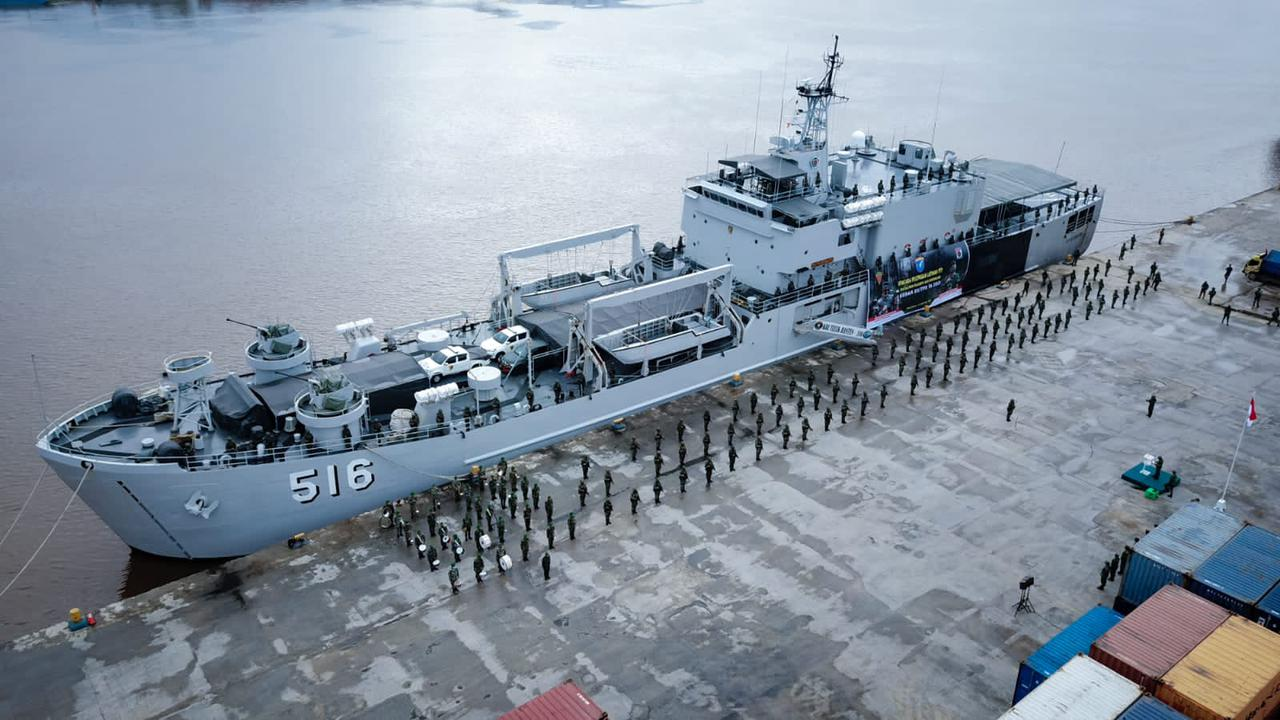
- KRI Teluk Banten in 2021

History

Indonesia
- Name: Teluk Banten
- Namesake: Banten Bay
- Ordered: June 1981
- Builder: Korea Tacoma Shipyard, Masan
- Commissioned: May 1982
- Identification: Pennant number: 516
- Status: Active

General characteristics
- Class & type: Teluk Semangka-class tank landing ship
- Displacement: 3,750 long tons (3,810 t) full
- Length: 100 m (330 ft)
- Beam: 14.4 m (47 ft)
- Draught: 4.2 m (14 ft)
- Propulsion: 2 × diesel engines 12,800 metric horsepower (9.4 MW); 2 × shafts, twin rudders
- Speed: 15 knots (28 km/h; 17 mph)
- Range: 7,500 nmi (13,900 km; 8,600 mi) at 13 knots (24 km/h; 15 mph)
- Boats & landing craft carried: 2 × LCVPs
- Capacity: 17 × main battle tanks; 1,800 t (1,772 long tons) cargo
- Troops: 200
- Complement: 90 (13 officers)
- Sensors & processing systems: Decca Radar, I band; Raytheon surface search radar, E/F band
- Armament: 2 x single Bofors 40 mm L/70; 2 x single Rheinmettal 20 mm; 2 x single DShK 12.7 mm
- Aircraft carried: 3 x AS332 Super Puma
- Aviation facilities: Helipad; Hangar

KRI Teluk Banten (516) is the fifth Teluk Semangka-class tank landing ship of the Indonesian Navy.

== Design ==
The ship has a length of 100 m (330 ft), a beam of 14.4 m (47 ft), with a draught of 4.2 m (14 ft) and her displacement is 3,750 long tons (3,810 t) at full load. She was powered by two diesel engines, with total sustained power output of 12,800 metric horsepower (9.4 MW) distributed in two shaft. Teluk Banten has a speed of 15 knots (28 km/h), with range of 7,500 nautical miles (13,900 km) while cruising at 13 knots (24 km/h).

Teluk Banten has a capacity of 200 troops, 1,800 long tons (1,800 t) of cargo (which includes 17 main battle tanks), and 2 LCVPs on davits. The ship has a complement of 90 personnel, including 13 officers. Teluk Banten is a command ship variant of the class and has distinguishing features such as the LCVP davits located forward of the bridge and the exhaust vents above the waterlines instead of funnels found on the other ships.

She were armed with two single Bofors 40 mm L/70 guns, two single Rheinmettal 20 mm autocannons, and two single DShK 12.7 mm heavy machine guns.

The ship has hangar facility and helicopter deck in the aft with provisions for up to 3 Eurocopter AS332 Super Puma helicopters.

== Construction and commissioning ==
Teluk Banten was built by Korea Tacoma Shipyard in Masan, ordered in June 1981. She was commissioned in May 1982.

In the 1987 ASEAN Summit, was held in the Philippines from 14 to 16 December. At that time in the Philippines there had just been a succession of President Marcos and the situation there was very precarious, as bomb explosions and threats from the dissident military haunted the president. Many parties asked to move the summit from the Philippines, but the Indonesian government firmly rejected the proposal and ensured that it was safe to go to the Philippines. To ensure that the Indonesian Armed Forces Headquarters made preparations to send a Navy fleet to the Philippines. Indonesian Navy sent 5 warships to form a Presidential Security Task Force with 2 ships anchored at Manila and 3 ships standing by offshore. The two ships that were in Manila were KRI Teluk Banten with the Puma Helicopter on her deck and the frigate KRI Wihelmus Zakaria Yohannes as escort.

In 1992, KRI Teluk Banten, along with KRI Yos Sudarso and KRI Ki Hajar Dewantara intercepted the Portuguese ship Lusitania Expresso in East Timor. Col. Widodo, deputy assistant of the Indonesian Navy's Eastern Fleet, told Radio Republik Indonesia from aboard the Indonesian warship KRI Yos Sudarso that the ferry entered Indonesian waters at 5:28 in the morning of 11 March 1992. At 6:07, Lusitania Expresso had traveled two to three nautical miles (3.7 to 5.6 km; 2.3 to 3.5 mi) into Indonesian territory and Captain Luis Dos Santos (Lusitania Expresso's captain) was ordered to leave immediately. Col. Widodo said the Portuguese ship captain obeyed the order and turned his ship around and headed back to sea.

On 9 January 2005, she together with KRI Teluk Langsa was dispatched together with the US Navy Seahawk helicopter to deliver relief supplies and evacuate Indonesian citizens in Calang, Aceh Jaya Regency after a tsunami took place. Sailors from USS Abraham Lincoln also assisted the situation.

She was involved in Operation Benteng Paus 2014 to carry out border security which includes prevention and deterrence as well as taking action against violations of the territory around the Indonesia-Australia-East Timor border.

== Bibliography ==
- Gardiner, Robert; Chumbley, Stephen; Budzbon, Przemysław (1995). Conway's All the World's Fighting Ships 1947-1995. Annapolis, Maryland: Naval Institute Press. ISBN 9781557501325.
- Saunders, Stephen (2009). Jane's Fighting Ships 2009-2010. Jane's Information Group. ISBN 978-0710628886.
