= KRI Teluk Semangka =

Teluk Semangka-class landing ship tank

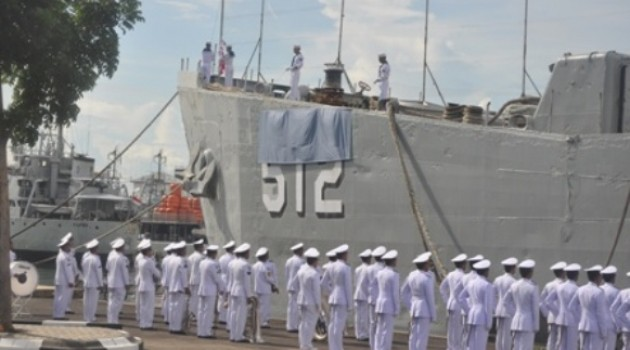
- KRI Teluk Semangka on 24 April 2013

History

Indonesia
- Name: Teluk Semangka
- Namesake: Semangka Bay
- Ordered: June 1979
- Builder: Korea Tacoma Shipyard, Masan
- Launched: 3 May 1980
- Commissioned: 20 January 1981
- Decommissioned: 24 April 2013
- Identification: Pennant number: 512
- Fate: Sunk as target, 2013

General characteristics
- Class & type: Teluk Semangka-class tank landing ship
- Displacement: 3,750 long tons (3,810 t) full
- Length: 100 m (330 ft)
- Beam: 14.4 m (47 ft)
- Draught: 4.2 m (14 ft)
- Propulsion: 2 × diesel engines 12,800 metric horsepower (9.4 MW); 2 × shafts, twin rudders
- Speed: 15 knots (28 km/h; 17 mph)
- Range: 7,500 nmi (13,900 km; 8,600 mi) at 13 knots (24 km/h; 15 mph)
- Boats & landing craft carried: 4 × LCVPs
- Capacity: 17 × main battle tanks; 1,800 t (1,772 long tons) cargo
- Troops: 200
- Complement: 90 (13 officers)
- Sensors & processing systems: Decca Radar, I band
- Armament: 3 x single Bofors 40 mm L/70; 2 x single Rheinmettal 20 mm; 2 x single DShK 12.7 mm
- Aircraft carried: 1 x NBO-105
- Aviation facilities: Helipad

KRI Teluk Semangka (512) is the lead ship of the Teluk Semangka-class tank landing ship of the Indonesian Navy.

== Design ==
The ship has a length of 100 m (330 ft), a beam of 14.4 m (47 ft), with a draught of 4.2 m (14 ft) and her displacement is 3,750 long tons (3,810 t) at full load. She was powered by two diesel engines, with total sustained power output of 12,800 metric horsepower (9.4 MW) distributed in two shaft. Teluk Semangka has a speed of 15 knots (28 km/h), with range of 7,500 nautical miles (13,900 km) while cruising at 13 knots (24 km/h).

Teluk Semangka has a capacity of 200 troops, 1,800 long tons (1,800 t) of cargo (which includes 17 main battle tanks), and 4 LCVPs on davits. The ship has a complement of 90 personnel, including 13 officers.

She were armed with three single Bofors 40 mm L/70 guns, two single Rheinmettal 20 mm autocannons, and two single DShK 12.7 mm heavy machine guns.

The ship has helicopter decks in the amidships and aft for small to medium helicopter such as Westland Wasp or MBB Bo 105.

== Construction and commissioning ==
KRI Teluk Semangka was built by Korea Tacoma Shipyard in Masan, ordered in June 1979. She was commissioned on 20 January 1981.

She was decommissioned on 24 April 2013 and later on 1 May, two Indonesian Navy warships registered as state property by the Ministry of Defense have been approved for destruction. The Directorate General of State Assets of the Ministry of Finance has approved the destruction of KRI Teluk Semangka and KRI Teluk Berau. The two ships were sunk as targets in a joint Indonesian Navy exercise.

== Bibliography ==
- Saunders, Stephen (2009). Jane's Fighting Ships 2009-2010. Jane's Information Group. ISBN 978-0710628886.
