= KRI Teluk Mandar =

Teluk Semangka-class landing ship tank

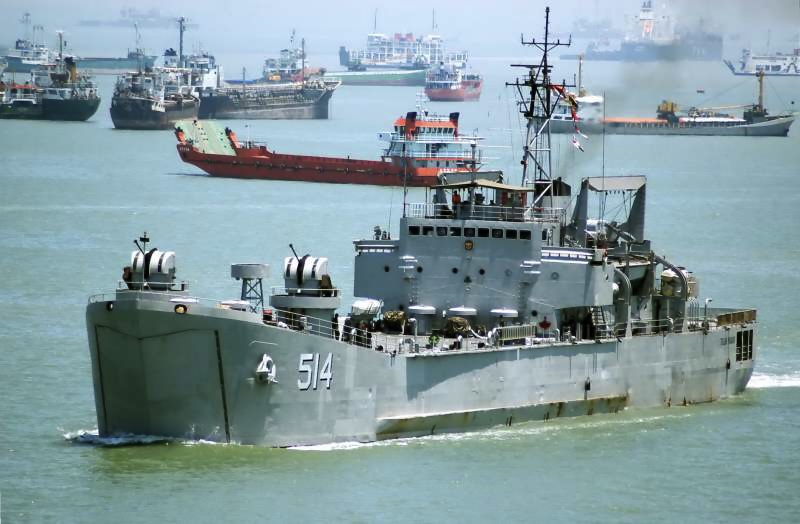
- KRI Teluk Mandar

History

Indonesia
- Name: Teluk Mandar
- Namesake: Mandar Bay, Polewali
- Ordered: June 1979
- Builder: Korea Tacoma Shipyard, Masan
- Commissioned: July 1981
- Identification: Pennant number: 514
- Status: Retired

General characteristics
- Class & type: Teluk Semangka-class tank landing ship
- Displacement: 3,750 long tons (3,810 t) full
- Length: 100 m (330 ft)
- Beam: 14.4 m (47 ft)
- Draught: 4.2 m (14 ft)
- Propulsion: 2 × diesel engines 12,800 metric horsepower (9.4 MW); 2 × shafts, twin rudders
- Speed: 15 knots (28 km/h; 17 mph)
- Range: 7,500 nmi (13,900 km; 8,600 mi) at 13 knots (24 km/h; 15 mph)
- Boats & landing craft carried: 4 × LCVPs
- Capacity: 17 × main battle tanks; 1,800 t (1,772 long tons) cargo
- Troops: 200
- Complement: 90 (13 officers)
- Sensors & processing systems: Decca Radar, I band
- Armament: 3 x single Bofors 40 mm L/70; 2 x single Rheinmettal 20 mm; 2 x single DShK 12.7 mm
- Aircraft carried: 1 x NBO-105
- Aviation facilities: Helipad

KRI Teluk Mandar (514) is the third Teluk Semangka-class tank landing ship of the Indonesian Navy.

== Design ==
The ship has a length of 100 m (330 ft), a beam of 14.4 m (47 ft), with a draught of 4.2 m (14 ft) and her displacement is 3,750 long tons (3,810 t) at full load. She is powered by two diesel engines, with total sustained power output of 12,800 metric horsepower (9.4 MW) distributed in two shaft. Teluk Mandar has a speed of 15 knots (28 km/h), with range of 7,500 nautical miles (13,900 km) while cruising at 13 knots (24 km/h).

Teluk Mandar has a capacity of 200 troops, 1,800 long tons (1,800 t) of cargo (which includes 17 main battle tanks), and 4 LCVPs on davits. The ship has a complement of 90 personnel, including 13 officers.

She is armed with three single Bofors 40 mm L/70 guns, two single Rheinmettal 20 mm autocannons, and two single DShK 12.7 mm heavy machine guns.

The ship has helicopter decks in the amidships and aft for small to medium helicopter such as Westland Wasp or MBB Bo 105.

== Construction and commissioning ==
KRI Teluk Mandar was built by Korea Tacoma Shipyard in Masan, ordered in June 1979. She was commissioned in July 1981.

== Bibliography ==
- Saunders, Stephen (2009). Jane's Fighting Ships 2009-2010. Jane's Information Group. ISBN 978-0710628886.
