= Teluk Semangka-class tank landing ship =

Class of landing ship tanks of the Indonesian Navy

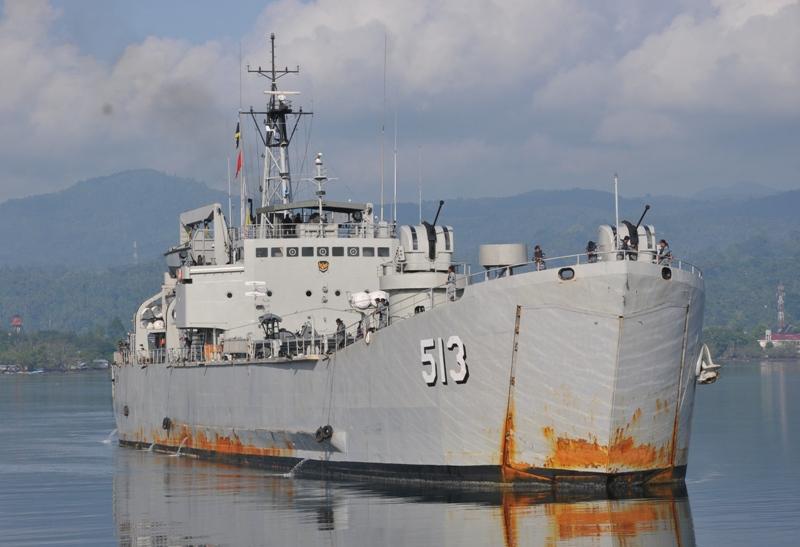
- KRI Teluk Penyu in 2014

Class overview
- Name: Teluk Semangka class
- Builders: Korea Tacoma Shipbuilding, Masan
- Operators: Indonesian Navy
- Preceded by: Teluk Langsa class
- Succeeded by: Teluk Gilimanuk class
- Built: 1980-1982
- In commission: 1981–present
- Planned: 6
- Completed: 6
- Active: 3
- Retired: 3

General characteristics
- Type: Tank landing ship
- Displacement: 3,750 long tons (3,810 t) full
- Length: 100 m (330 ft)
- Beam: 14.4 m (47 ft)
- Draught: 4.2 m (14 ft)
- Propulsion: 2 × diesel engines 12,800 metric horsepower (9.4 MW); 2 × shafts, twin rudders
- Speed: 15 knots (28 km/h; 17 mph)
- Range: 7,500 nmi (13,900 km; 8,600 mi) at 13 knots (24 km/h; 15 mph)
- Boats & landing craft carried: 2-4 × LCVPs
- Capacity: 17 × main battle tanks; 1,800 t (1,772 long tons) cargo
- Troops: 200
- Complement: 90 (13 officers)
- Sensors & processing systems: Decca Radar, I band; Raytheon surface search radar, E/F band (516 and 517)
- Armament: 512 to 515: 3 x single Bofors 40 mm L/70; 2 x single Rheinmettal 20 mm; 2 x single DShK 12.7 mm; 516 to 517: 2 x single Bofors 40 mm L/70; 2 x single Rheinmettal 20 mm; 2 x single DShK 12.7 mm
- Aircraft carried: 1 x NBO-105; 3 x AS332 Super Puma (516 and 517)
- Aviation facilities: Helipad; Hangar (516 and 517)

The Teluk Semangka class is a class of tank landing ships operated by the Indonesian Navy. The ships were built by the Korea-Tacoma Shipyard (now Hanjin Heavy Industries), Masan, South Korea in the early 1980s.

== Design ==
The class design was based on the LST-542-class tank landing ship. The class has a length of 100 m (330 ft), a beam of 14.4 m (47 ft), with a draught of 4.2 m (14 ft) and their displacement is 3,750 long tons (3,810 t) at full load. The ships is powered by two diesel engines, with total sustained power output of 12,800 metric horsepower (9.4 MW) distributed in two shaft. Teluk Semangka class has a speed of 15 knots (28 km/h), with range of 7,500 nautical miles (13,900 km) while cruising at 13 knots (24 km/h).

Teluk Semangka class has a capacity of 200 troops, 1,800 long tons (1,800 t) of cargo (which includes 17 main battle tanks), and 2 (4 for Teluk Semangka and Teluk Mandar) LCVPs on davits. The ships has a complement of 90 personnel, including 13 officers. Two last ships of the class, Teluk Ende and Teluk Banten, are command ships and has distinguishing features such as the LCVP davits located forward of the bridge and the exhaust vents above the waterlines instead of funnels found on the other ships.

The ships are armed with three single Bofors 40 mm L/70 guns, two single Rheinmettal 20 mm autocannons, and two single DShK 12.7 mm heavy machine guns. The command variant has same weaponry with one less 40 mm gun.

It was noted that Teluk Ende was outfitted as a hospital ship but later was reverted back to landing ship and the Red Cross markings were removed.

The ships has helicopter decks in the amidships and aft for small to medium helicopter such as Westland Wasp or MBB Bo 105, with the command variants having hangar facility and helicopter deck in the aft with provisions for up to 3 Eurocopter AS332 Super Puma helicopters.

== Ships in the class ==
Hull no.	Name	Builder	Launched	Commissioned	Decommissioned
512	Teluk Semangka	Korea Tacoma Shipbuilding, Masan	3 May 1980	20 January 1981	24 April 2013
513	Teluk Penyu	Korea Tacoma Shipbuilding, Masan		20 January 1981	16 August 2019
514	Teluk Mandar	Korea Tacoma Shipbuilding, Masan		July 1981	27 January 2022
515	Teluk Sampit	Korea Tacoma Shipbuilding, Masan		June 1981	
Command variant
516	Teluk Banten	Korea Tacoma Shipbuiling, Masan		May 1982	
517	Teluk Ende	Korea Tacoma Shipbuiling, Masan		2 September 1982	

== See also ==
Equivalent landing ships of the same era

- Miura class
- Ropucha class
- Hengam class

== Bibliography ==
- Gardiner, Robert; Chumbley, Stephen; Budzbon, Przemysław (1995). Conway's All the World's Fighting Ships 1947-1995. Annapolis, Maryland: Naval Institute Press. ISBN 9781557501325.
- Saunders, Stephen (2009). Jane's Fighting Ships 2009-2010. Jane's Information Group. ISBN 978-0710628886.
