= Tanjung Bara =

Coal loading port in Indonesia

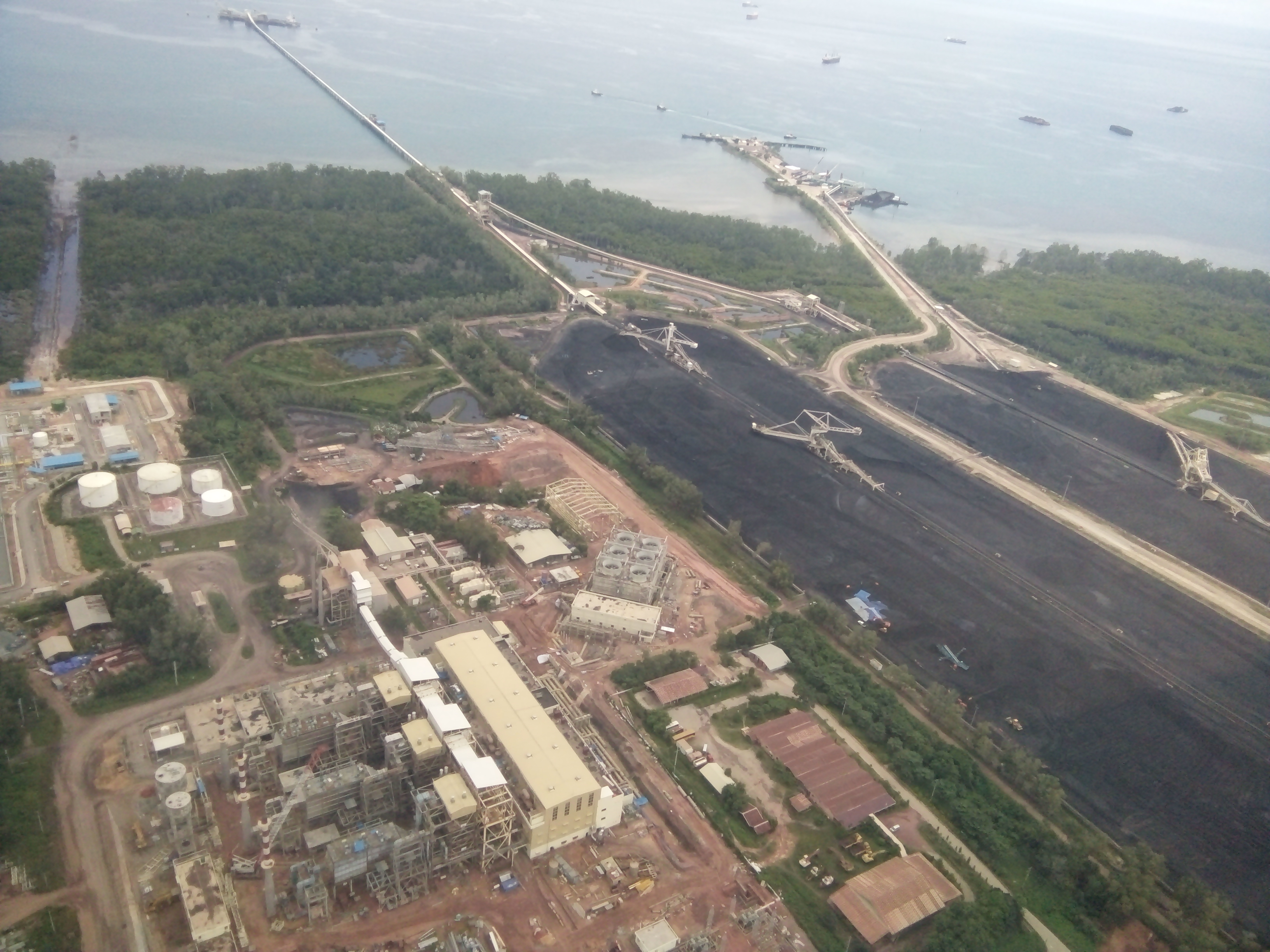
- Aerial view of Tanjung Bara
- Interactive map of Tanjung Bara
- Location of Tanjung Bara in Kalimantan

Location
- Country: Indonesia
- Location: East Kutai, East Kalimantan
- Coordinates: 0°35′9.68″N 117°42′13.34″E
- UN/LOCODE: IDTBA

Details
- Operated by: Kaltim Prima Coal
- Owned by: Kaltim Prima Coal
- Type of Harbor: Coal Port
- No. of wharfs: 4

Statistics
- Website kpc.co.id

Tanjung Bara Coal Terminal, abbreviated as TBCT (Indonesian: Terminal batu bara Tanjung Bara), or commonly known as Tanjung Bara, is a coal loading port in Indonesia. Primarily known for its coal loading terminal, it lies on the southeast coast of East Kalimantan, Borneo.

== Location ==
Tanjung Bara is located on the island of Kalimantan, in the East Kutai Regency. It lies about 20 kilometers (12 miles) north east off the town of Sangatta and Sangatta Coal Mine. The closest city to Tanjung Bara is Bontang.

== Port information ==
The port of Tanjung Bara is often also known as TBCT (Tanjung Bara Coal Terminal). The terminal started its operations in 1991 and has 4 concrete wharves with a length of 350 meters (380 yards). A a depth alongside of 17.25 meters (56.6 feet) at the Lowest astronomical tide (LAT) allows it to accommodate cape sized vessels. Tanjung Bara itself has a fair tidal range from 4.4 to 2.8 meters (14.4–9.2 feet). The channel leading to the port has a higher draft allowed of 25 meters (82 feet). While the stockpile on the jetty can store up to 1.25 metric tons (1.38 short tons) of coal, each of the quadrant type loaders is capable of loading at a rate of 4,200 metric tons (4,600 short tons) per hour, with a trajectory of 7 meters (7.7 yards). The port works around the clock and accepts bulk carriers of a length of 310 meters (340 yards) and a breadth of 50 meters (55 yards). The maximum size of ships that have berthed at TBCT is 210,000 DWT, usually starboard side alongside. 2 tugs of 40 metric tons (44 short tons) bollard pull are available and pilots usually board ships 7 miles (11 kilometers) away from the berth by boat.

The closest town to the port is the town of Sangatta; the capital of East Kutai Regency, which lies north of Bontang and Samarinda.

The port is owned and operated by Kaltim Prima Coal, a joint venture of BP and Rio Tinto.

Taboneo (Banjarmasin) and Tanjung Bara (TBCT) are among the largest coal loading ports of Indonesia.
