= Rheinmetall Mk 20 Rh-202 =

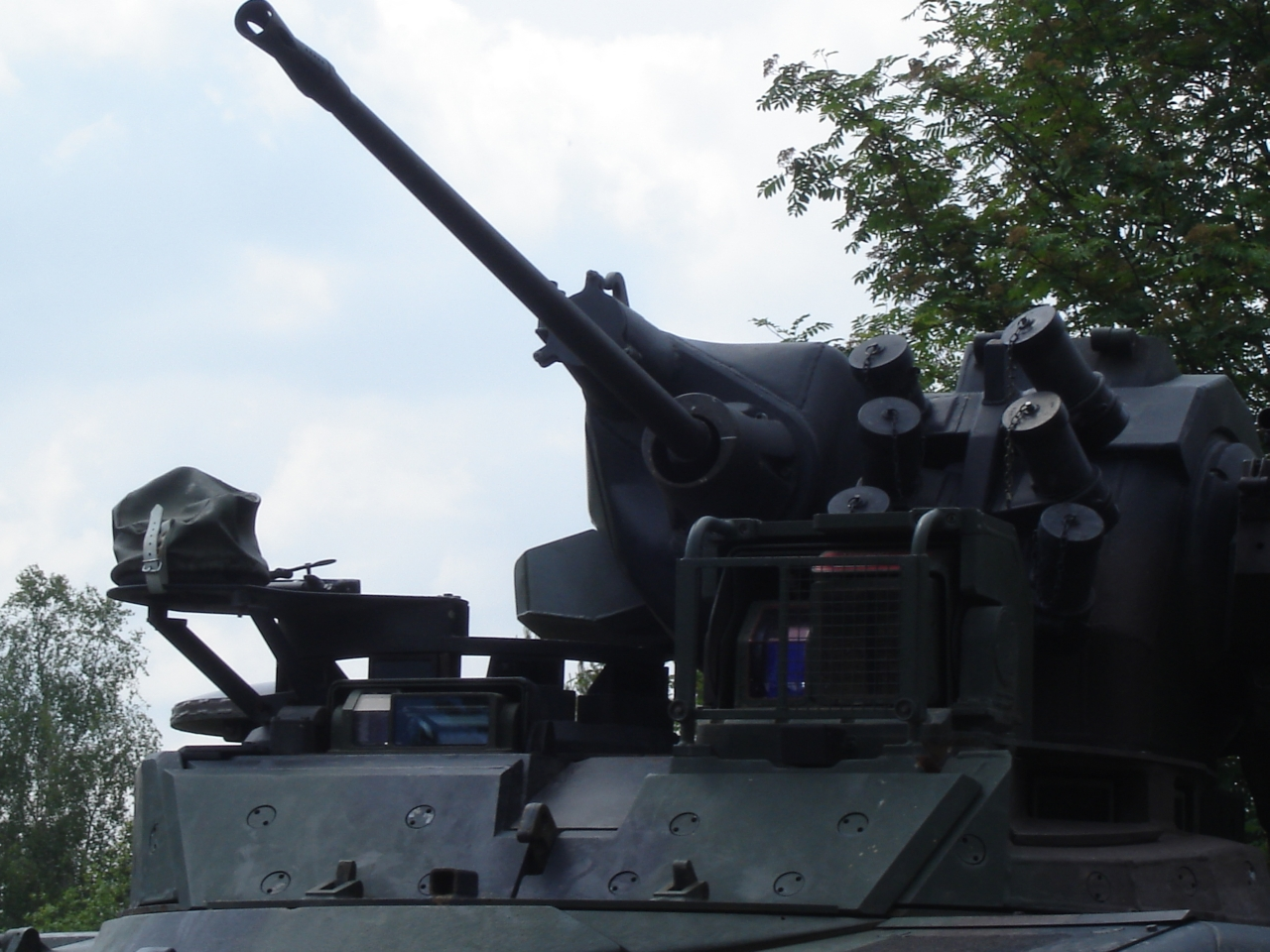
- A Rh-202 installed in a Marder 1A3 turret.
- Type: Autocannon
- Place of origin: West Germany

Production history
- Designer: Rheinmetall
- Designed: 1960s
- Manufacturer: Rheinmetall

Specifications
- Mass: 83 kg
- Length: 2612 mm
- Height: 241 mm
- Shell: 20 × 139 mm
- Caliber: 20 mm
- Action: Gas unlocked blowback
- Rate of fire: 880 to 1,030 rpm
- Muzzle velocity: 1,044 m/s with HEI; 1,100 m/s with AP
- Effective firing range: 1,600 m against high flying aircraft 2,500 m against ground targets

The Rheinmetall Mk 20 Rh-202 (short for Maschinenkanone 20 mm Rheinmetall) is a 20 mm caliber autocannon designed and produced by Rheinmetall. It fires the 20×139mm ammunition originally developed for the Hispano-Suiza HS.820.

The cannon is used on German military vehicles, including the Marder infantry fighting vehicle, the Spähpanzer Luchs and some variants of the Wiesel AWC. It is used in the Argentinian VCTP, an IFV based on the TAM chassis. A towed twin mount antiaircraft version was produced and used by Argentina in the Falklands War.

German naval ships also employed Rh 202 mounts, usually two on frigates and destroyers, four on larger replenishment ships. They have been or are currently being replaced with the new Mauser, now a subsidiary of Rheinmetall, MLG 27 remote-controlled guns of 27 mm calibre.

A version modified to fire the U.S. M50 series of 20×102mm ammunition loaded into the M14 link belt has been offered to no avail for the U.S. Government by Maremont Corporation, of Saco, Maine, licensed by Rheinmetall under marketing arrangement.

== 20 mm twin anti-aircraft mount variant ==
Flugabwehrkanone 20 mm Zwilling
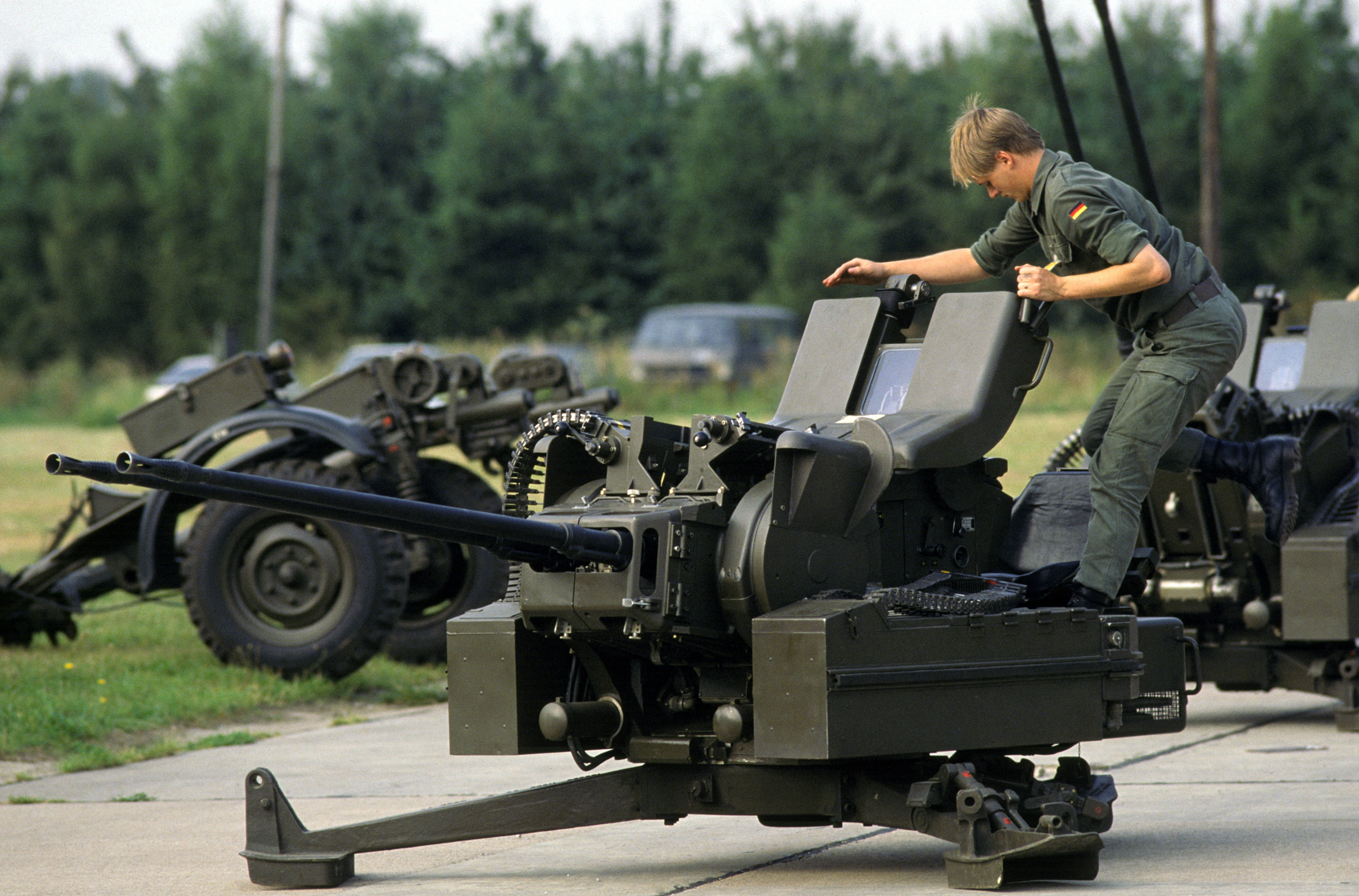
- A 20 mm twin gun 1095 of the German Air Force.
- Type: Autocannon
- Place of origin: West Germany

Production history
- Designer: Rheinmetall
- Designed: 1960s
- Manufacturer: Rheinmetall

Specifications
- Mass: 1,640 kg (combat ready); 2,050 kg (travelling)
- Length: 5 m (16 ft 5 in) (travelling)
- Barrel length: 1.8 m (5 ft 11 in)
- Width: 2.3 m (7 ft 7 in) (travelling)
- Height: 2 m (6 ft 7 in) (travelling)
- Crew: 3 to 4
- Shell: 20 × 139 mm
- Caliber: 20 mm
- Action: Gas unlocked blowback
- Elevation: -5° to +83.5°
- Traverse: 360°
- Rate of fire: 880 to 1,030 rpm per gun
- Muzzle velocity: 1,044 m/s with HEI; 1,100 m/s with AP
- Effective firing range: 1,600 m against high flying aircraft 2,500 m against ground targets

The Rheinmetall Zwillingsflak twin-gun anti-aircraft system began development in 1968 to meet the requirements of the low-level air defence units of the German Air Force, i.e. "to engage low and very low approaching enemy aircraft with all appropriate means in time to prevent them from firing their weapons or delivering their ordnance, or at least to prevent them from carrying out an accurate attack on an air force installation."

The Budget Committee of the Bundestag approved the Zwillingsflak system in December 1969. Serial production began in 1972. The first production systems reached units of the Bundeswehr in October 1972. Rheinmetall delivered the last of these in 1976.

This gun was used by the Argentine Air Force, including during the Falklands War.

Since 1981, it has been used by the Portuguese Army and Portuguese Air Force.

== Specifications ==
- Type: single-barrel automatic cannon
- Caliber: 20 × 139 mm (0.8 x 5.4 in)
- Operation: Gas-unlocked sliding breech block, blowback, recoiling base
- Length: 2612 mm (8 ft 7 in)
- Barrel length: 2002 mm
- Rifling angle: 6°
- Weight (complete): 75 kg (165 lb) single feed; 83 kg (183 lb) dual feed
- Rate of fire: 880–1,000 rpm
- Effective range: 2000 m
- Max. range: 7000 m
- Muzzle velocity: 1,050 to 1,150 m/s (3,440 to 3,770 ft/s)
- Recoil force: 550–750 kg
- Projectile weight: 134 g (0.3 lb) full calibre; 108 g APDS

== Operators ==
- Argentina – A total of 15 Rh 202 used by the Argentine Air Force were captured in the Falklands Conflict by the British. 9 at Port Stanley Airport and 6 at Goose Green airfield
- Germany – 1,015 ordered in 1969. Used between 1972 and 1992. Twin model now withdrawn from service, but the single barrel version still is used, usually vehicle-mountedThis gun is used with the Marder.
- Greece – 326 used by the Hellenic Air Force
- Portugal – 30 used by the Army and 6 by the Air Force.
- Turkey
- Indonesia - The Indonesian Army operates approximately 121 Rh 202 twin guns for its anti aircraft battalions as well as the Rh202 autocannon variant for its 50 Marder 1A3 IFVs. The Indonesian Navy also operates the Rh 202 autocannon on a variety of its vessels such as the Achmad Yani-class frigates, Fathillah-class corvettes, Mandau-class FAC, and Teluk Semangka-class LSTs.
- Italy - Deployed on Fiat CM6614.
- Pakistan
- Saudi Arabia - Deployed on Thyssen Henschel UR-416 of the Saudi Special Security Force.
- Sri Lanka - Deployed on the naval ships SLNS Sayurala (2016), SLNS Sindurala (2018) and on other vessels.
- Ireland - Secondary armament on naval patrol vessels.
- Chile – Deployed on Marder 1A3 IFVs.
- Syrian opposition
- Somaliland
- Ukraine – Deployed on Marder IFVs donated by Germany.

== Gallery ==
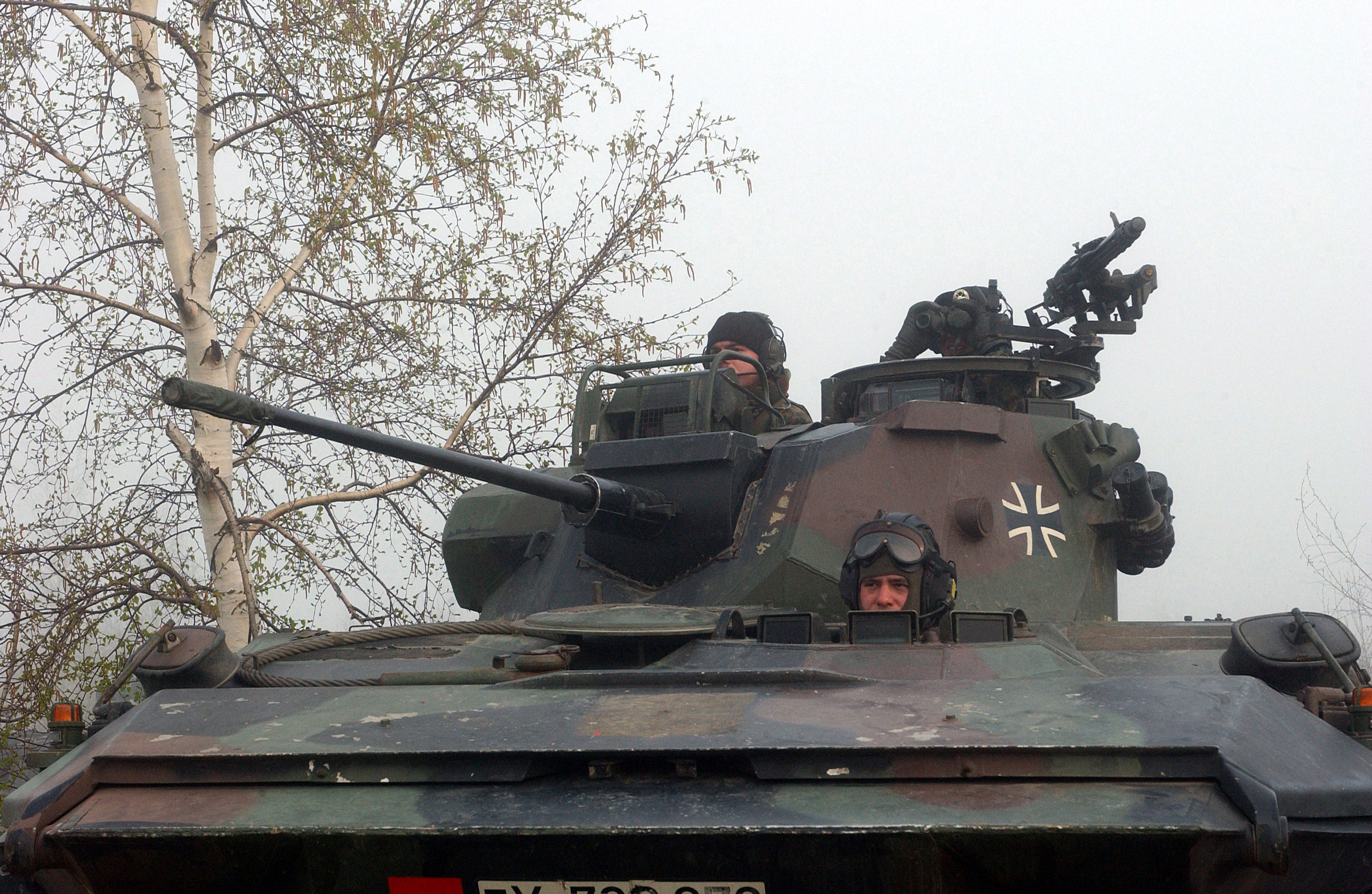
The turret of a German Army Luchs 2 armored reconnaissance vehicle showing a Rh 202 as the main armament.

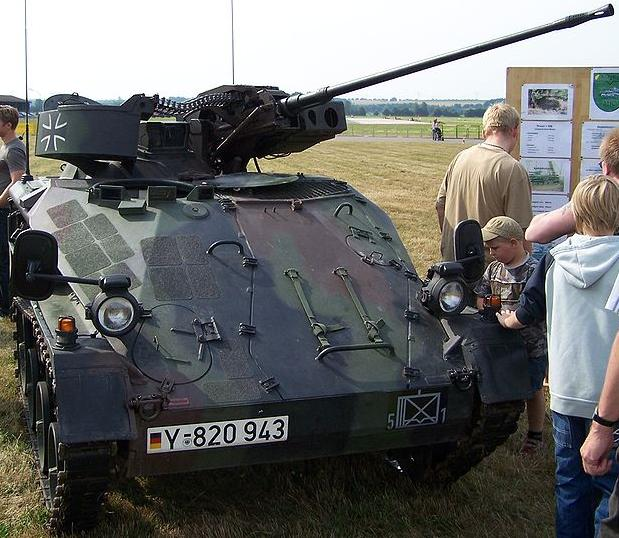
A German Army Wiesel AFV showing a Rh 202 as the main armament.

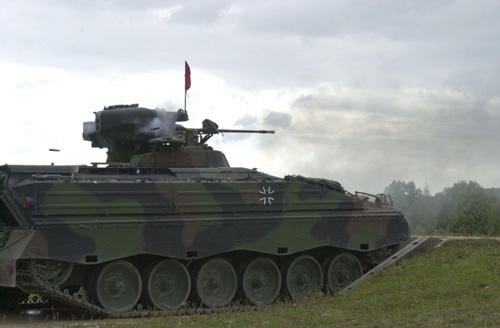
A German Army Marder fires its Rh202 20 mm cannon on a training exercise.

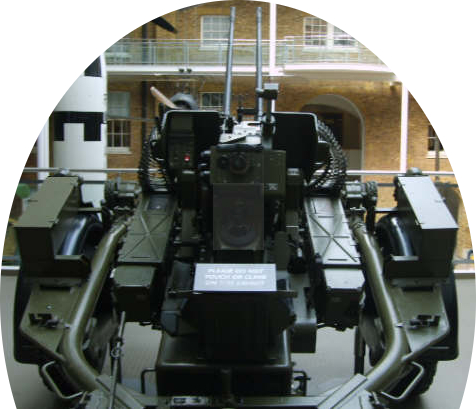
An Argentine Rheinmetall 20 mm twin anti-aircraft cannon, Imperial War Museum.

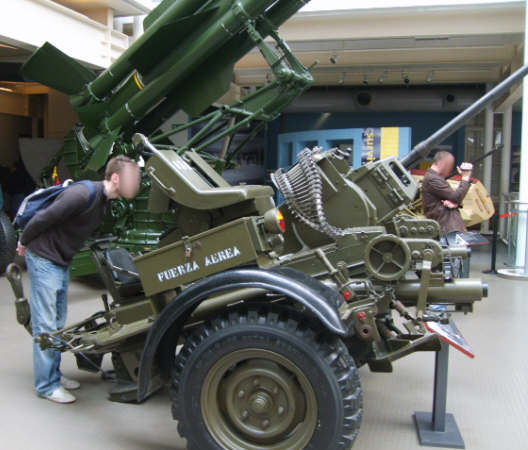
Same gun, with a man nearby for a reference of scale. Markings "Fuerza Aérea Argentina" (English: Argentine Air Force) on the side.

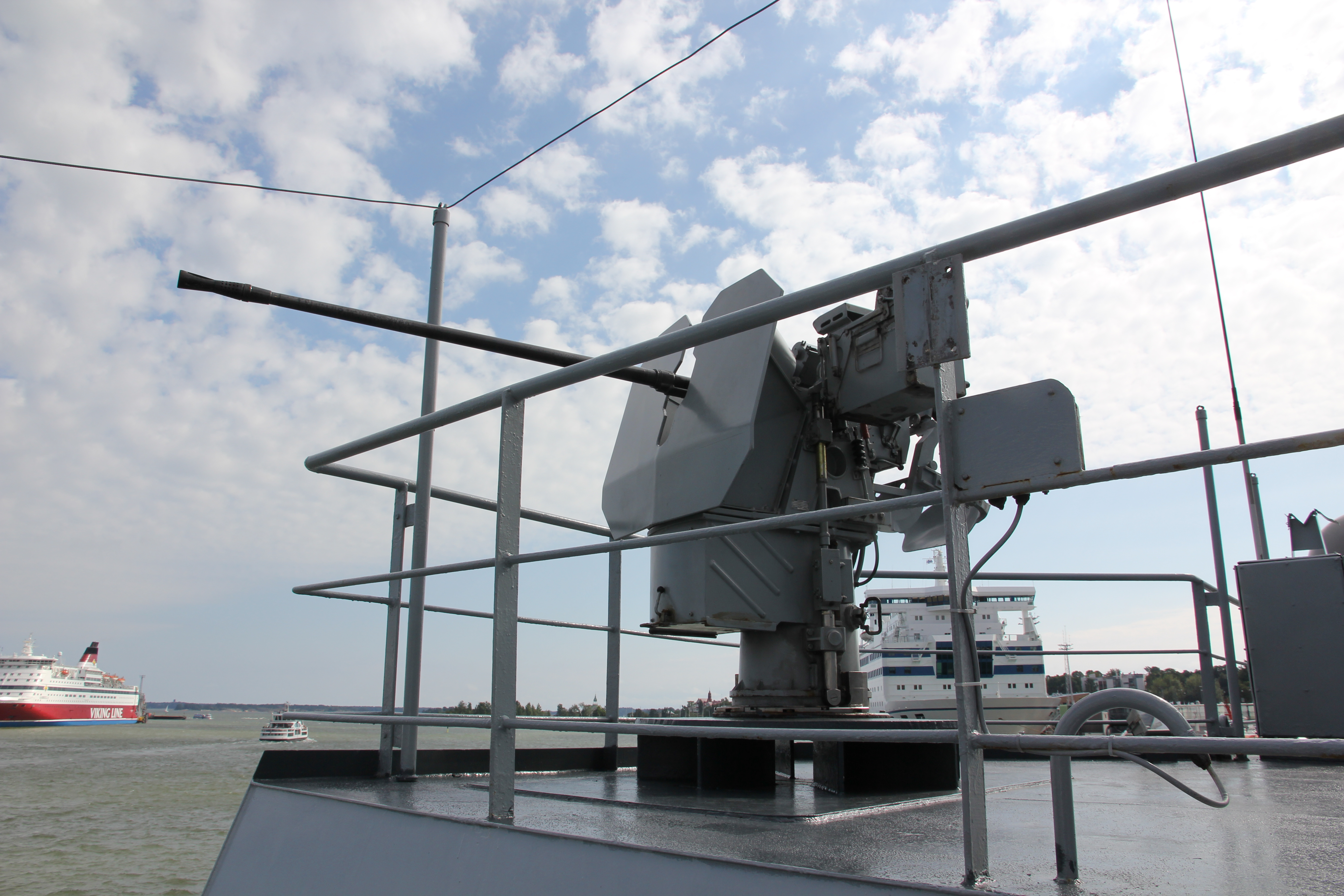
Naval mount, Irish offshore patrol ship LÉ Róisín (P51).

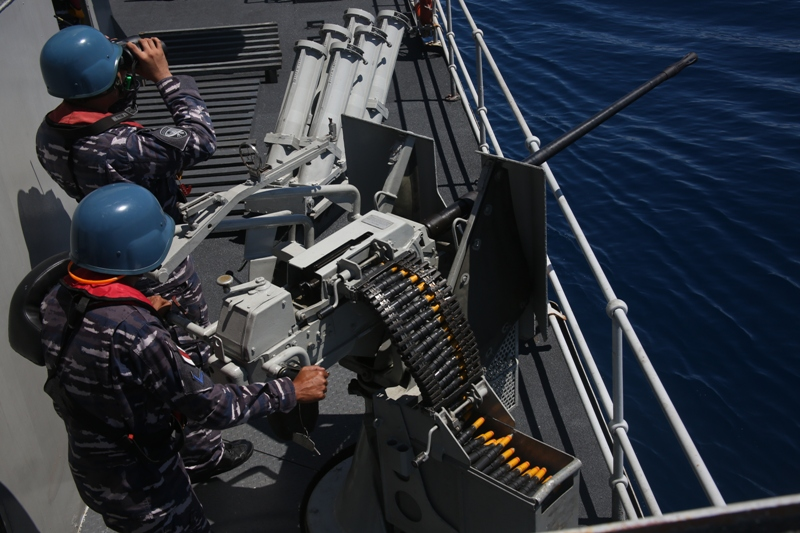
Another version of naval mount, Indonesian frigate KRI Abdul Halim Perdanakusuma (355).

== See also ==
- ZU-23-2
- Hispano-Suiza HS.820
- Oerlikon 35 mm twin cannon
- List of artillery
- List of anti-aircraft guns
- List of artillery of Germany
