= Davit =

Crane-like device used on a ship

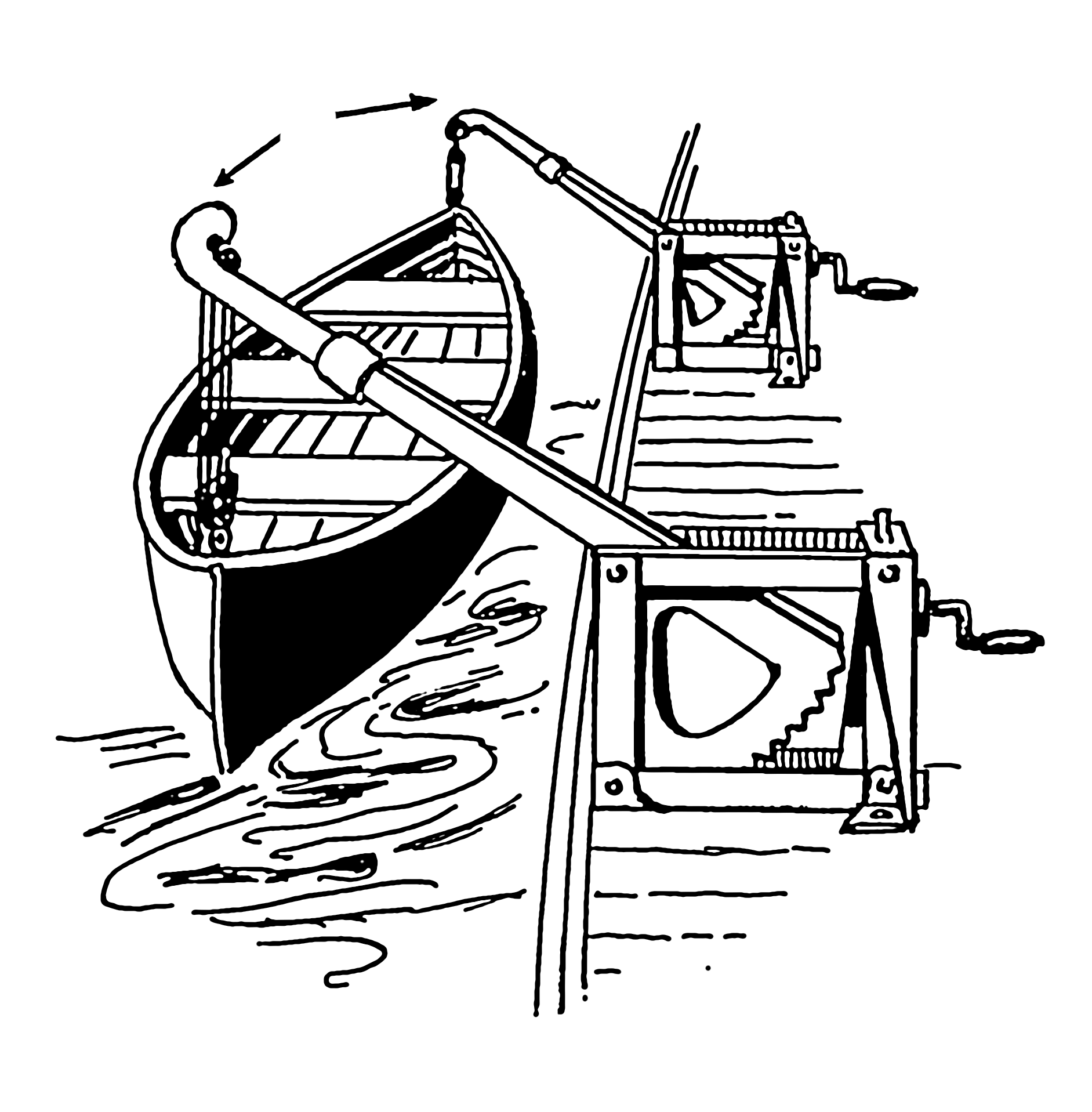
Boat suspended from Welin Quadrant davits; the boat is mechanically 'swung out'

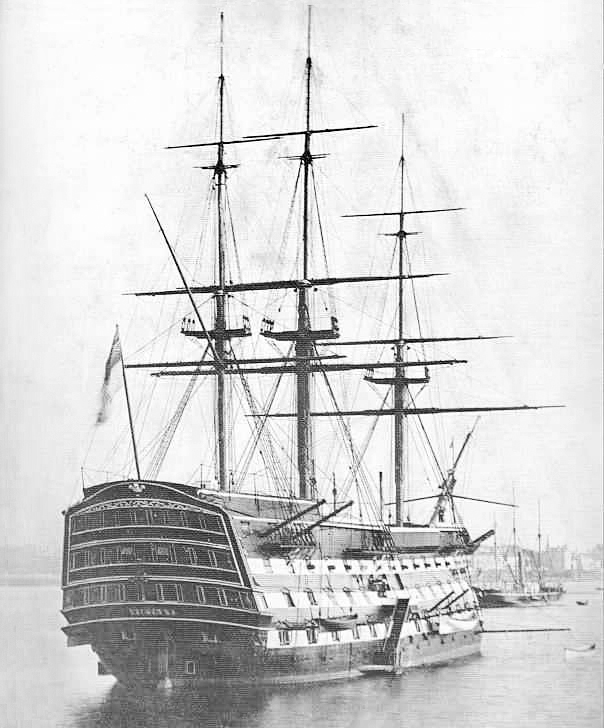
HMS Victory in the 19th century, showing her boats suspended from wooden davits

A davit (/ˈdeɪvɪt/) is any of various crane-like devices used on a ship for supporting, raising, and lowering equipment such as boats and anchors.

Davit systems are most often used to lower a lifeboat to the embarkation level to be boarded. The lifeboat davit has falls (now made of wire, historically of manila rope) that are used to lower the lifeboat into the water. Davits can also be used as man-overboard safety devices to retrieve personnel from the water.

The maintaining and operation of davits is all under jurisdiction of the International Maritime Organization. The regulations are enforced by the country's coast guard.

== Development ==
Davits were first devised in the 17th century for use by whaling ships in the Greenland whaling grounds. They began to be introduced into Royal Navy warships in the late 18th century and originally took the form of squared baulks of timber. Curved iron davits began to be introduced later in the 19th century.

Development of the davit has also been in terms of material. Traditionally davits have been made in aluminium or steel but recent advances in composite material have led to the manufacture of davits in carbon fibre which has an excellent strength-to-weight ratio. This means davits can be stowed away when not in use and the same davit used in several deck sockets fitted permanently on deck.

== Davit types ==
Davits are designed to fit into deck spaces that the naval architects deemed necessary:

- Radial (obsolete) – Hand powered davit. This type was used on the lifeboats of RMS Lusitania. Each arm must be rotated out manually; uses manila rope falls. Goose-neck shape to the arm that is swung out.
- Mechanical (obsolete) – This type is like the radial davit, but both arms are moved out at the same time using a screw system; uses manila rope falls. An example is the Welin Quadrant davit type used aboard RMS Titanic.
- Gravity (industry standard) – There are multiple forms; one man can operate; uses wire falls.
  - Roller – Davit slides down a track, bringing the davit to the embarkation deck.
  - Single pivot – One pivot point where the lifeboat is moved over the side of the craft.
  - Multi-pivot – Common on promenade decks of cruise ships. Useful where space is limited.
  - Free fall – Lifeboat slides right off vessel. Lifeboat must be an enclosed type. Main type of Davit on merchant ships now. This type does not use falls.
  - Fixed – Common on oil rigs. Lifeboat is hung above the water (at embarkation level) and lowered into the water.

== Components ==
Liferaft
These can be enclosed, partially enclosed, or open.
Frapping lines
These lines are used on all davits except the fixed and freefall davits. The frapping lines are used to pull the lifeboat over to the embarkation deck along with the tricing pendant to be loaded.
Gripes
Ropes used to hold the lifeboat in the stored position while underway.
Tricing pendants
Lines used to initially pull the lifeboat over to the embarkation deck so that the frapping lines can be connected.
Falls
The wires which lift or lower the lifeboat are known as falls.

== Release mechanisms ==
There are three basic systems used to release the lifeboat from the davit.

On-load
For this style of release mechanism, the lifeboat can be released at any point from the davit. This type of system allows a lifeboat to be released when it is not in the water, whether this is because of the emergency or an accident. Because of this, during an evacuation the release mechanism must be watched to make sure there is not an accidental activation.
Off-load
This release mechanism requires the weight (load) of the lifeboat to not be on the hook when it is released. This includes the Titanic-era Monomony hook design that requires someone to remove the hook from the lifeboat by hand. But this type also includes the hydrostatic system many lifeboats use now. For this, a float is raised up and engages the release once the craft is in the water to the right depth.
Free-fall
This type of release mechanism is very basic. The (enclosed) lifeboat is on a ramp and slides down and off of the ship when engaged. This is done by pumping a lever that is inside the lifeboat by the pilot. If there is not enough hydraulic pressure to release the stop fall, a pump on the inside must be rotated to build up the hydraulic pressure to release the lifeboat's stopfall hook. Once the stopfall hook (hook attaching the lifeboat to the davit that holds it to the ship) is released the lifeboat will slide off the ramp and into the water. This type of lifeboat is more common due to its quick deployment and ease of operation.

== Gallery ==
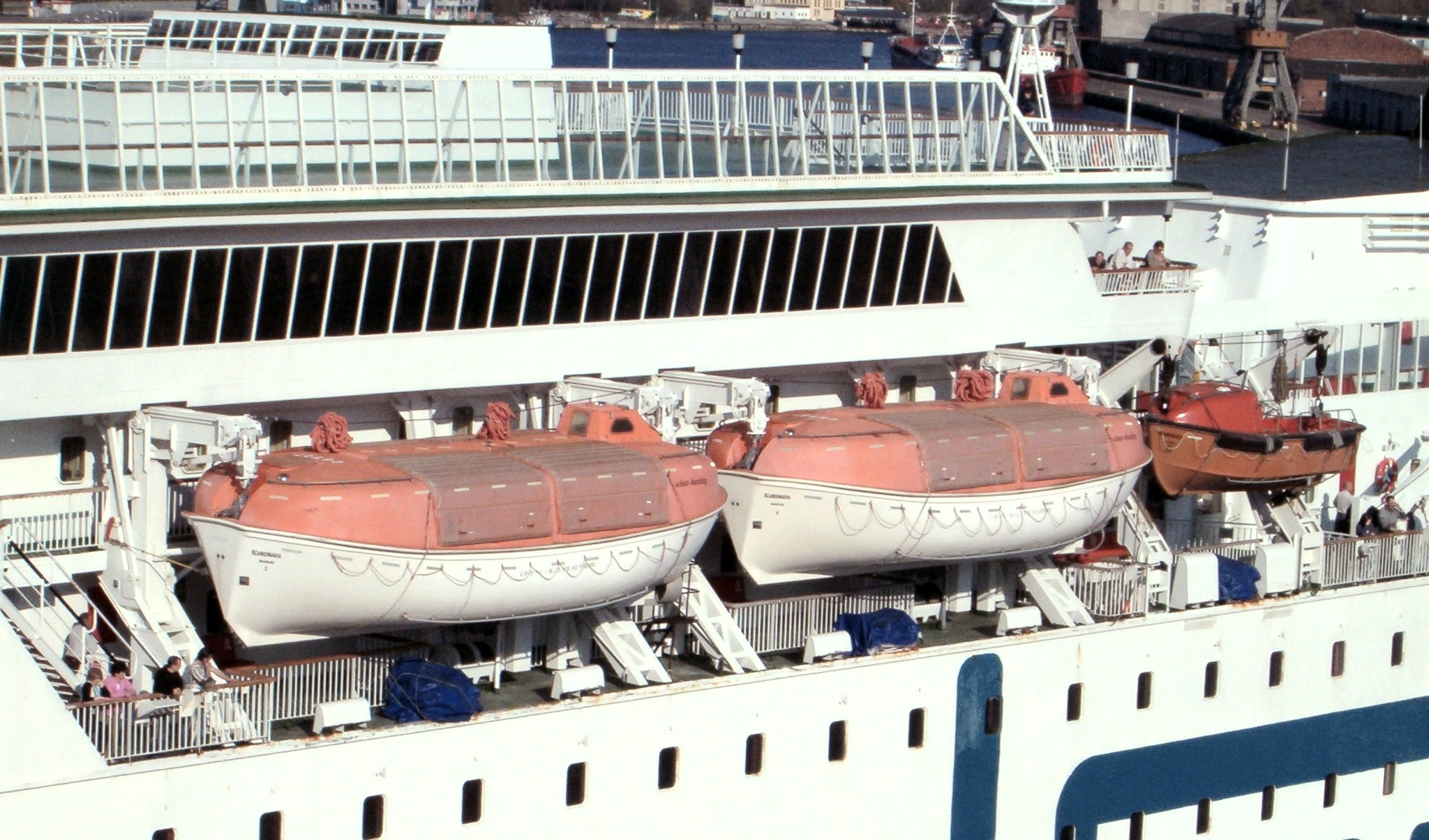
Gravity multi-pivot on cruiseferry Scandinavia

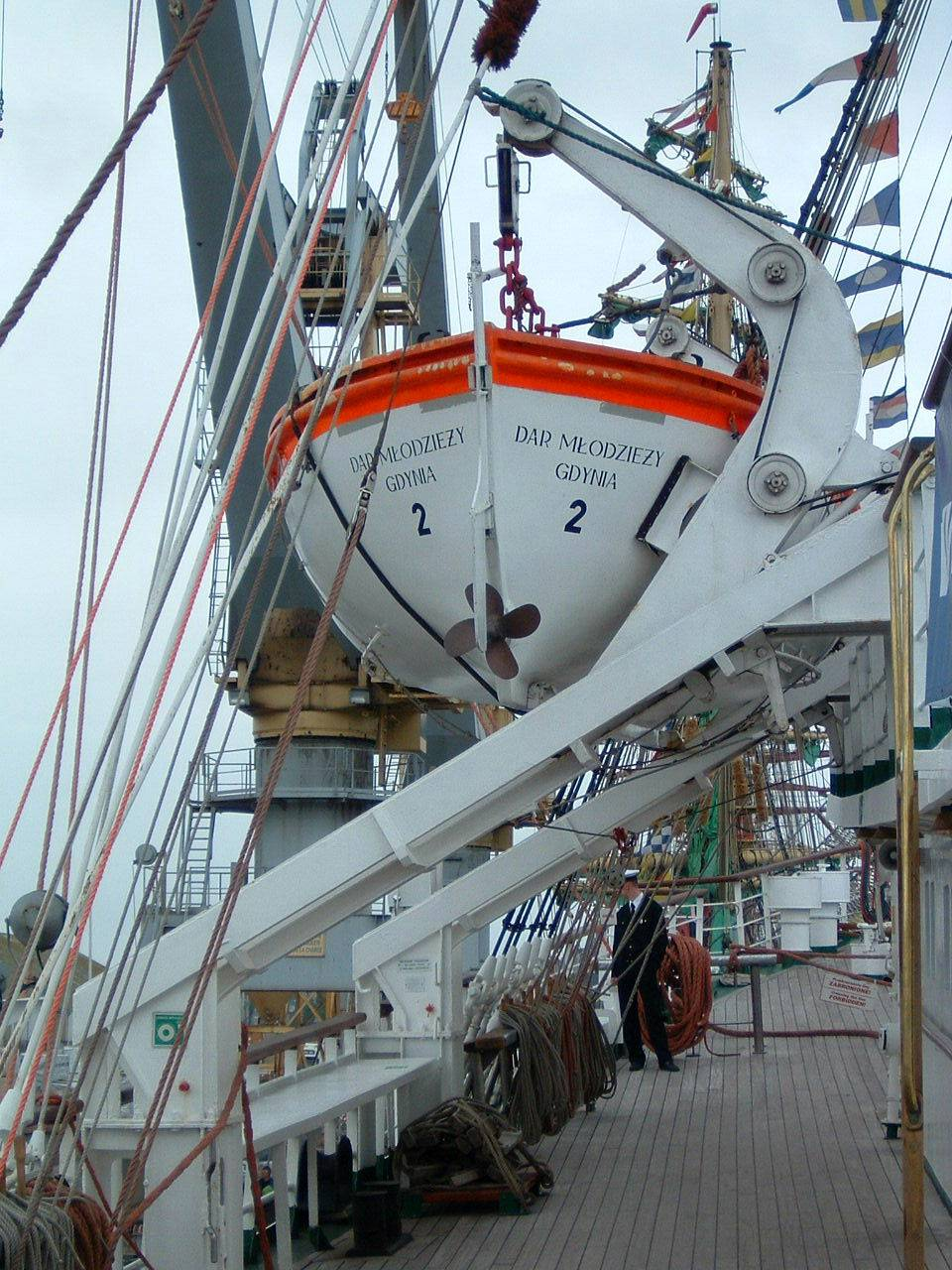
Gravity Roller Davit

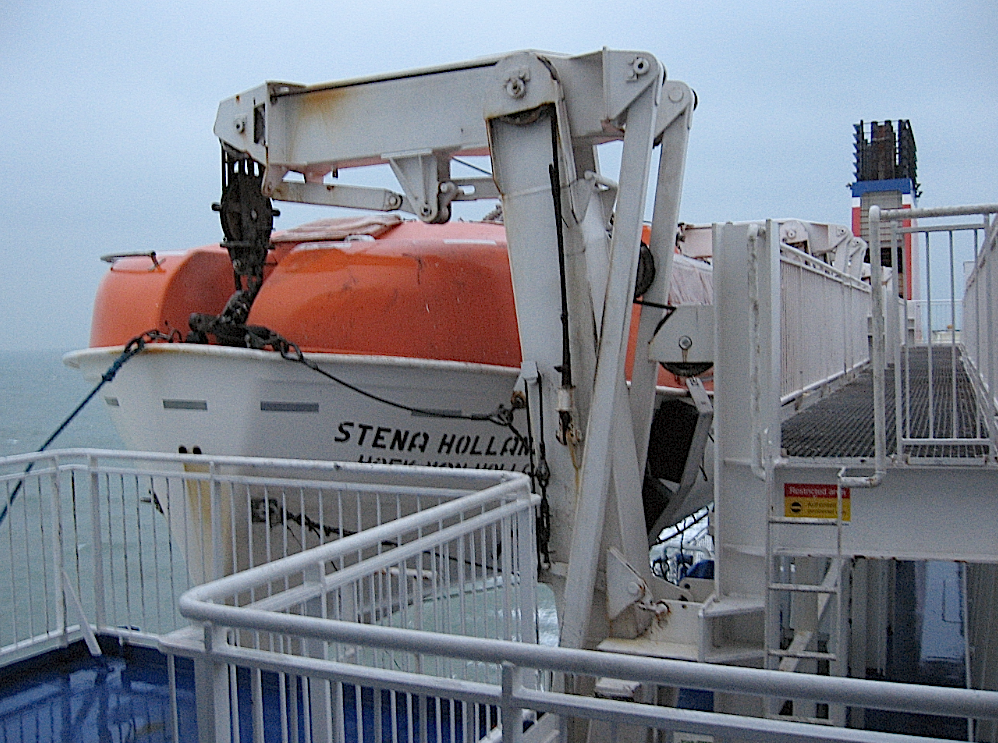
Gravity multi-pivot davit holding rescue vessel on a North Sea ferry

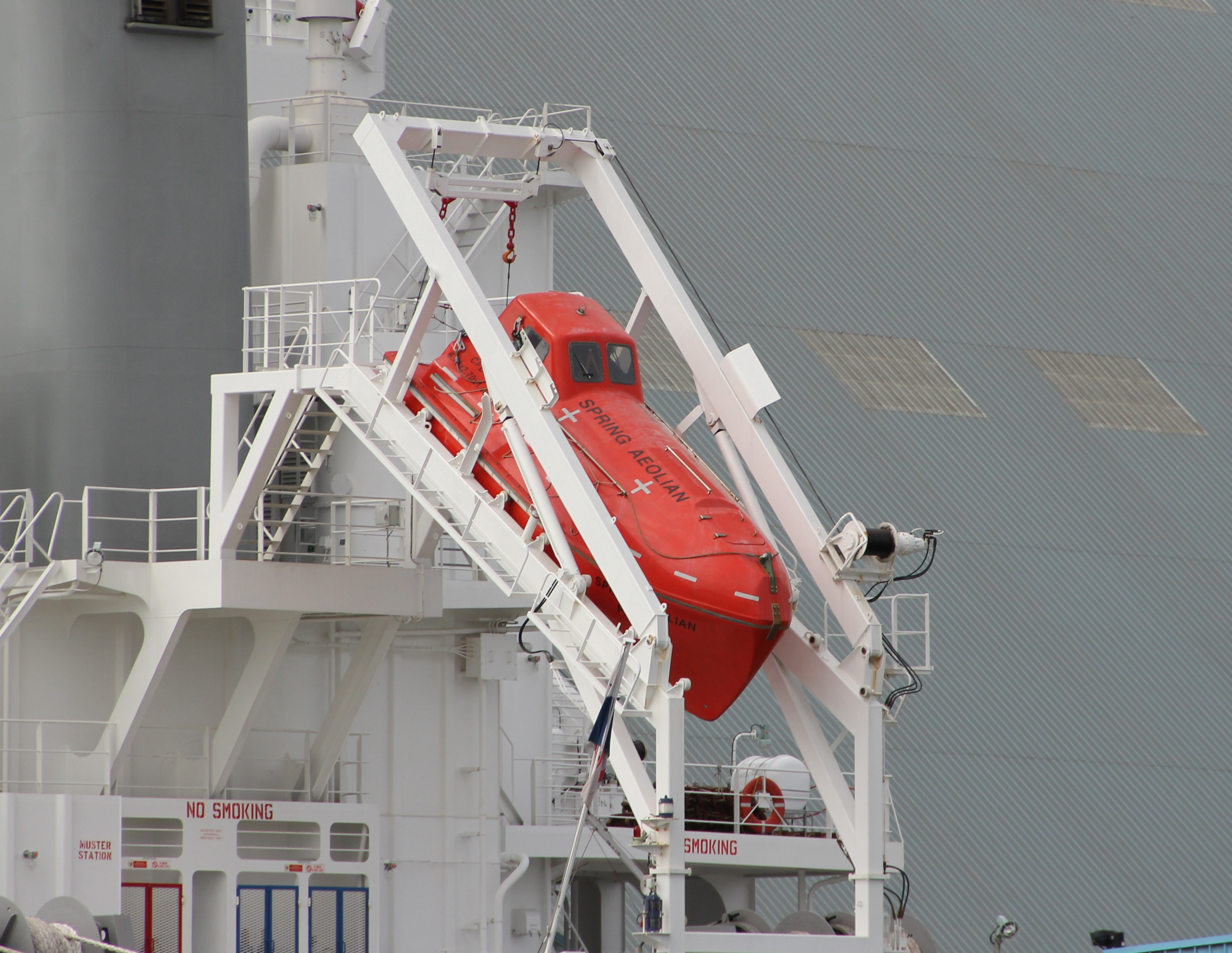
Freefall lifeboat on the Spring Aeolian

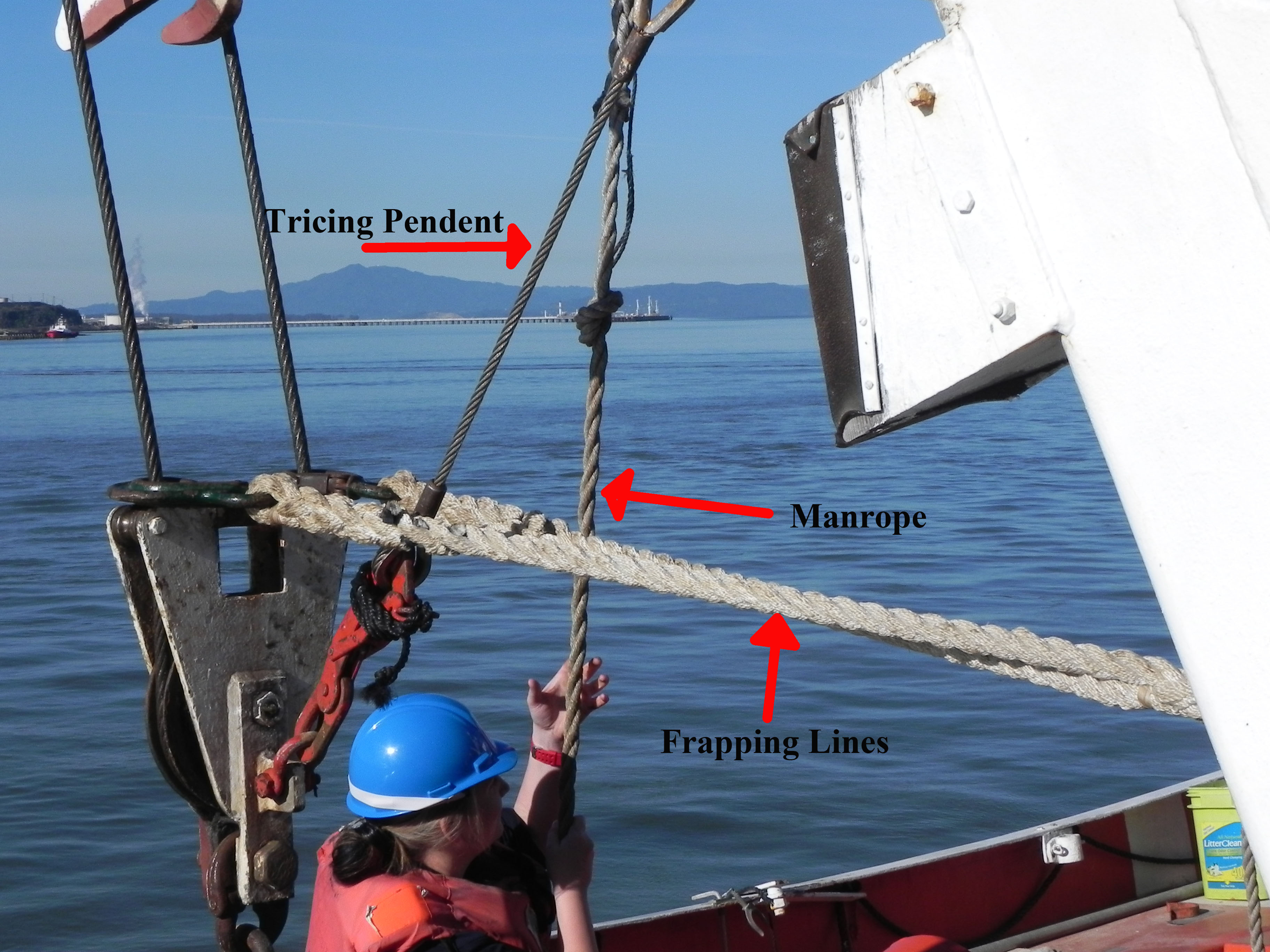
Frapping line

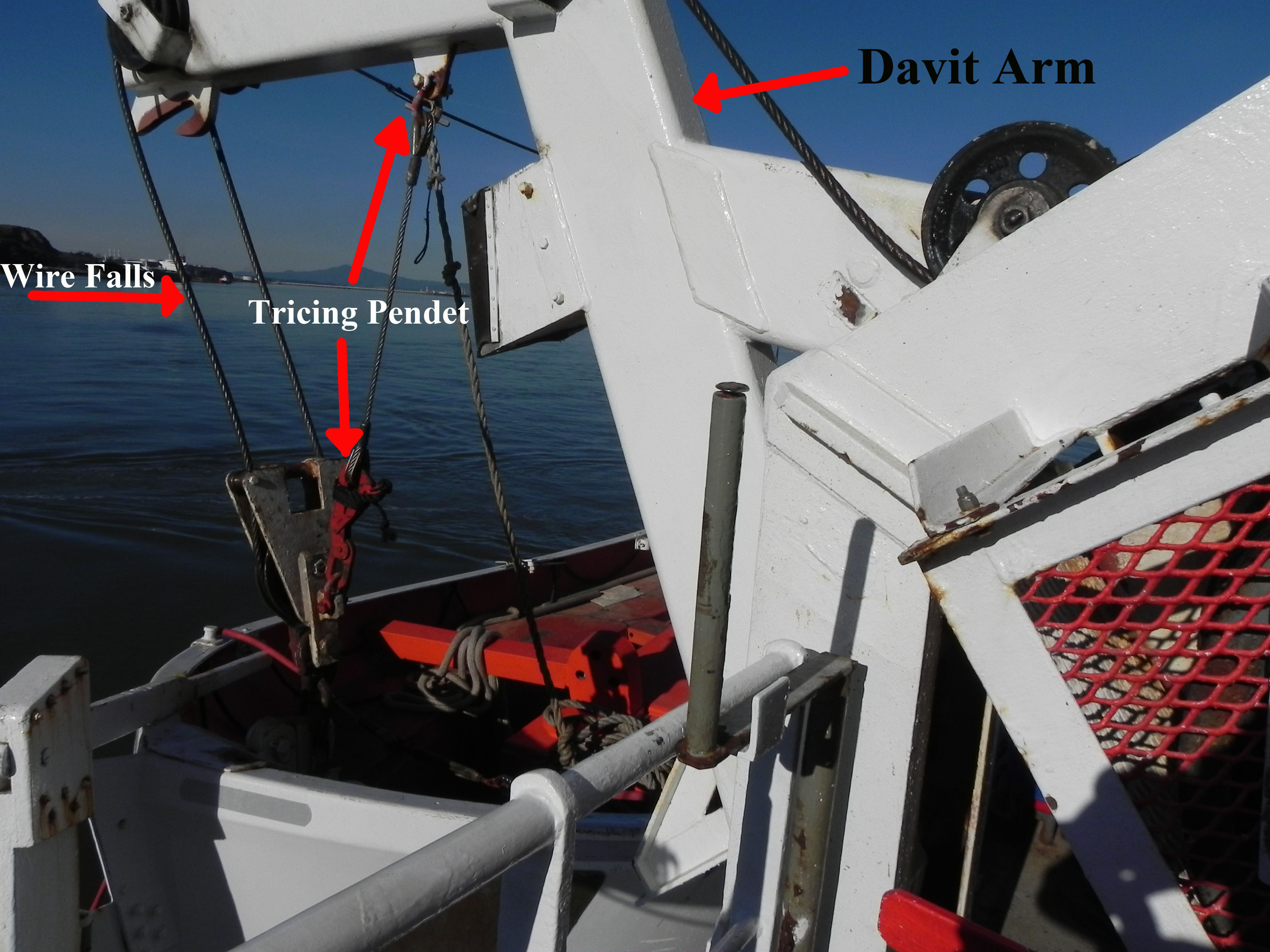
Labeled Tricing

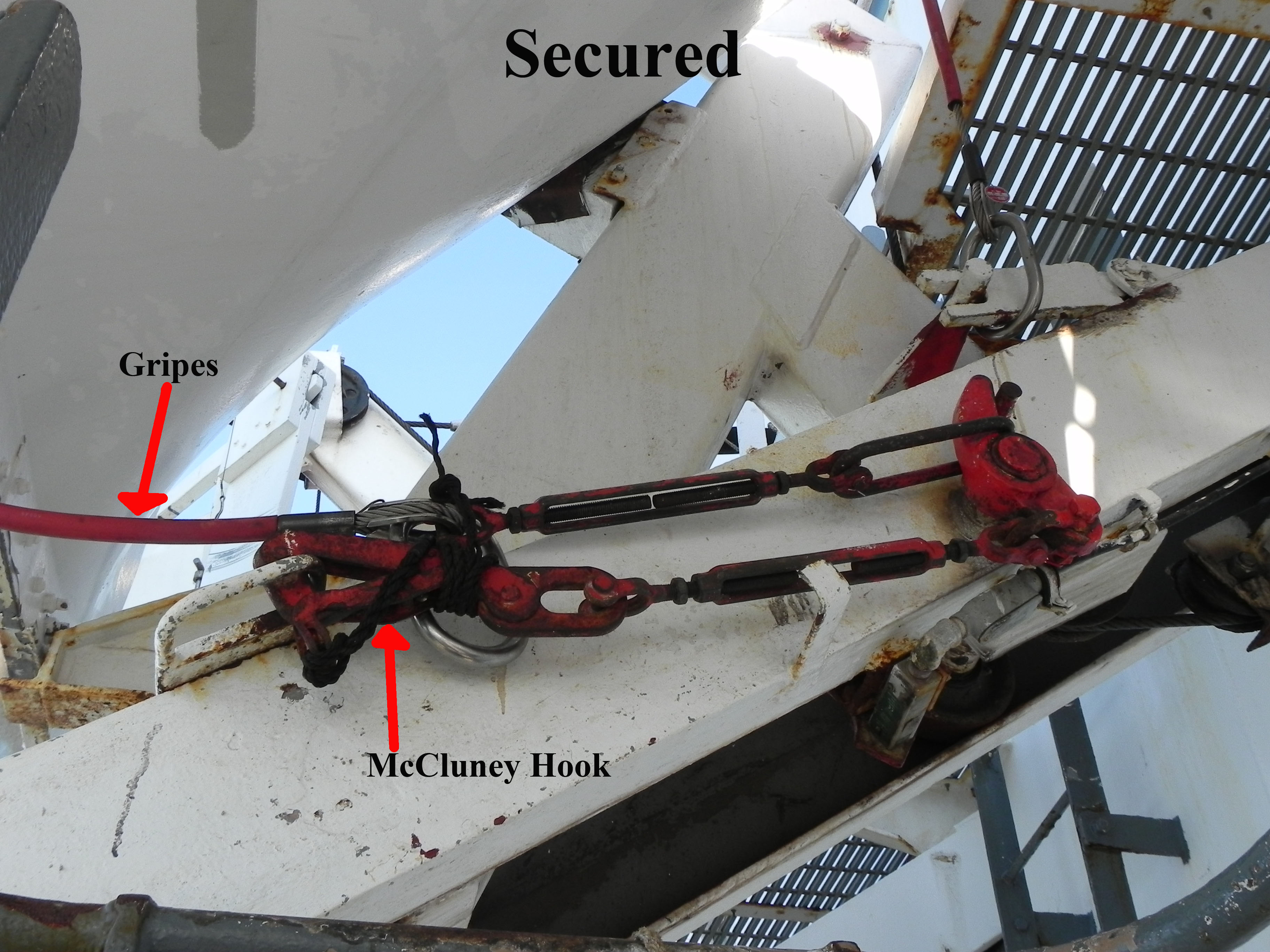
Gripe

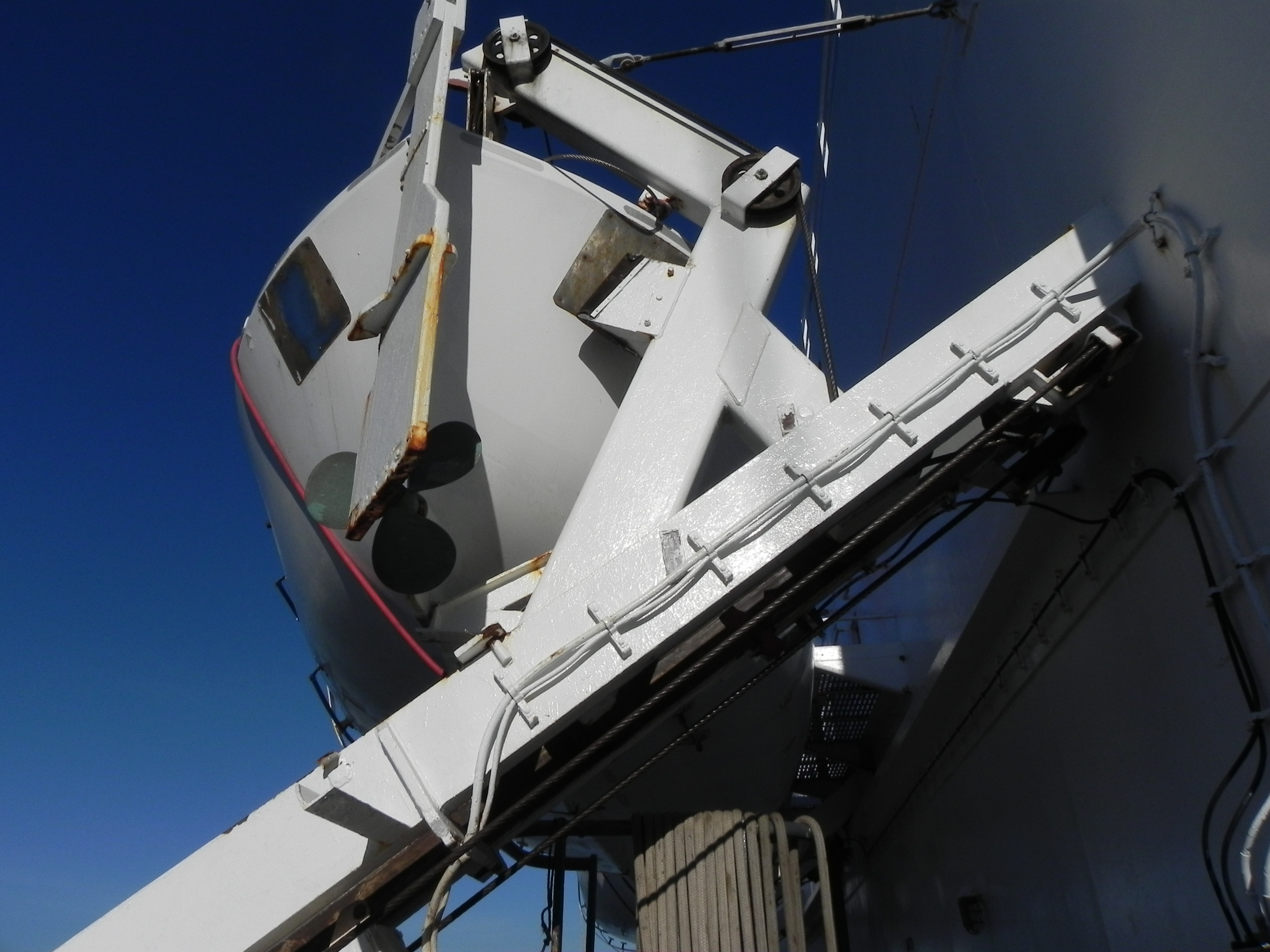
Roller Gravity Davit
