= Landing craft vehicle personnel =

Ship used to transport troops or vehicles to shore

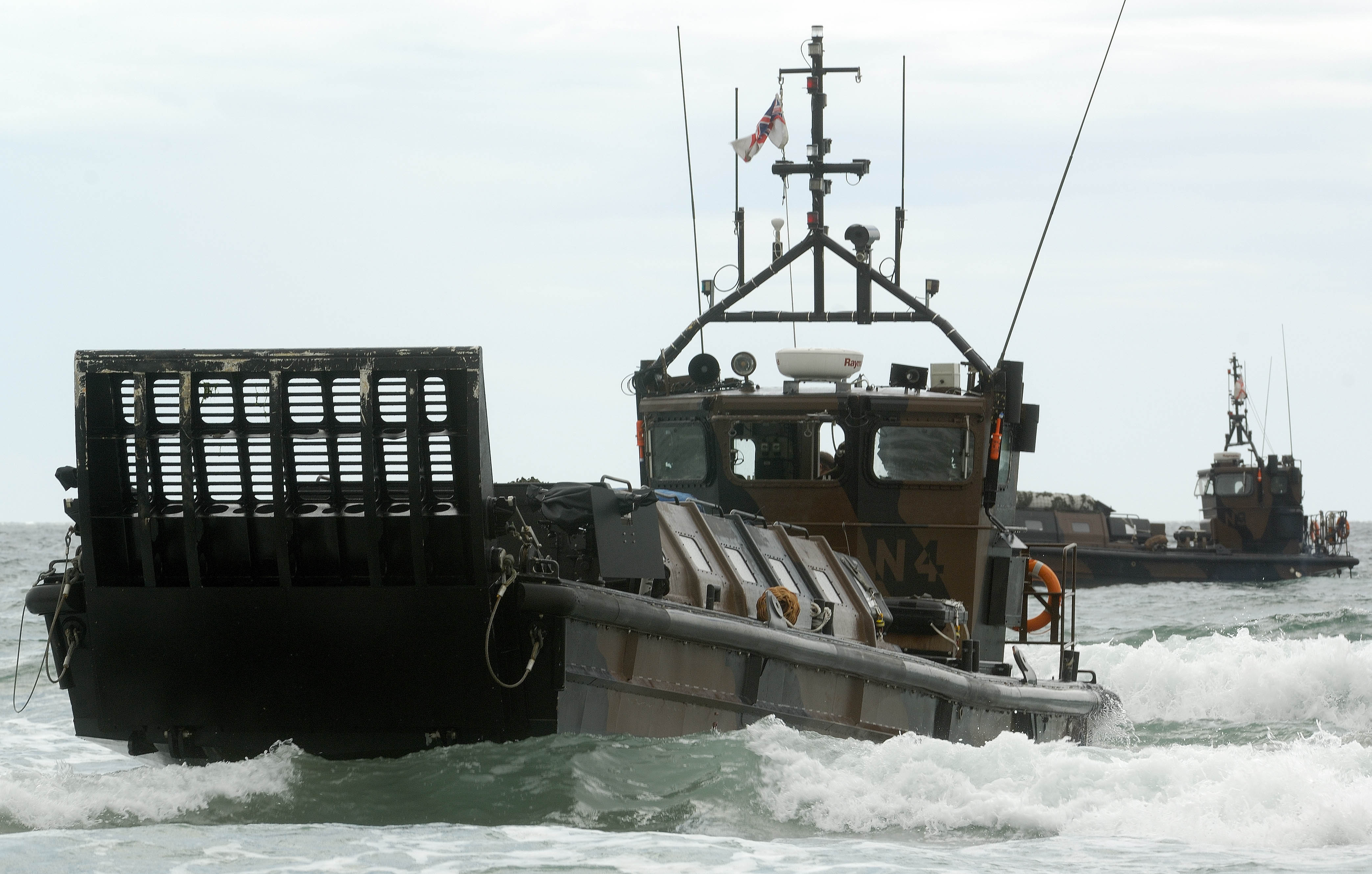
A Royal Marines landing craft vehicle personnel (LCVP) MK5

A landing craft vehicle personnel or landing craft, vehicle, personnel (LCVP) is any of a variety of amphibious landing craft designed to transport troops or armoured vehicles from ship to shore during amphibious landings.

== Australia ==
Since 1993, the Royal Australian Navy has operated four Australian-designed and built landing craft, vehicle and personnel (similar in size and concept to the World War II LCVP) from the landing ship, heavy HMAS Tobruk and replenishment oiler HMAS Success. These aluminum craft were built by Geraldton Boat Builders and can carry up to 36 personnel or a Land Rover with a half-ton trailer. They are maintained for the RAN by the firm DMS Maritime. As of 2007, T 4 was held in reserve at the naval base HMAS Cairns, T 5 and T 6 were carried by Tobruk, and T 7 was embarked on Success. The craft remained in service as of 2015.

== United Kingdom ==
The designation was first used in British service for the LCVP Mk2s introduced with the two Fearless class amphibious transport docks, the role having previously been carried out by the landing craft assault developed during the Second World War. They are manned and operated by 1 Assault Group Royal Marines.

== United States ==
The American version of the LCVP, the Higgins boat, was used extensively in amphibious landings in World War II. The craft was designed by Andrew Higgins based on boats made for operating in swamps and marshes. More than 20,000 were built, by Higgins Industries and licensees. Typically constructed from plywood, this shallow-draft, barge-like boat could ferry a platoon-sized complement of 36 men to shore at 9 knots (17 km/h). Men generally entered the boat by climbing down a cargo net hung from the side of their troop transport; they exited by charging down the boat's bow ramp.

== Others ==
Other countries with naval resources may also have LCVPs. For example, the Italian ship San Giusto is recorded as having a complement of these. The Royal Canadian Navy's supply ship MS Asterix is equipped with 2 LCVP.

== See also ==
- Landing vehicle tracked ("Amtrac")
- Landing ship, tank (LST)
- Landing craft mechanized (LCM)
- Landing craft assault
- Landing craft personnel (Large)
- Gray Marine Engine
