= Decca Radar =

Former British manufacturer of radar systems

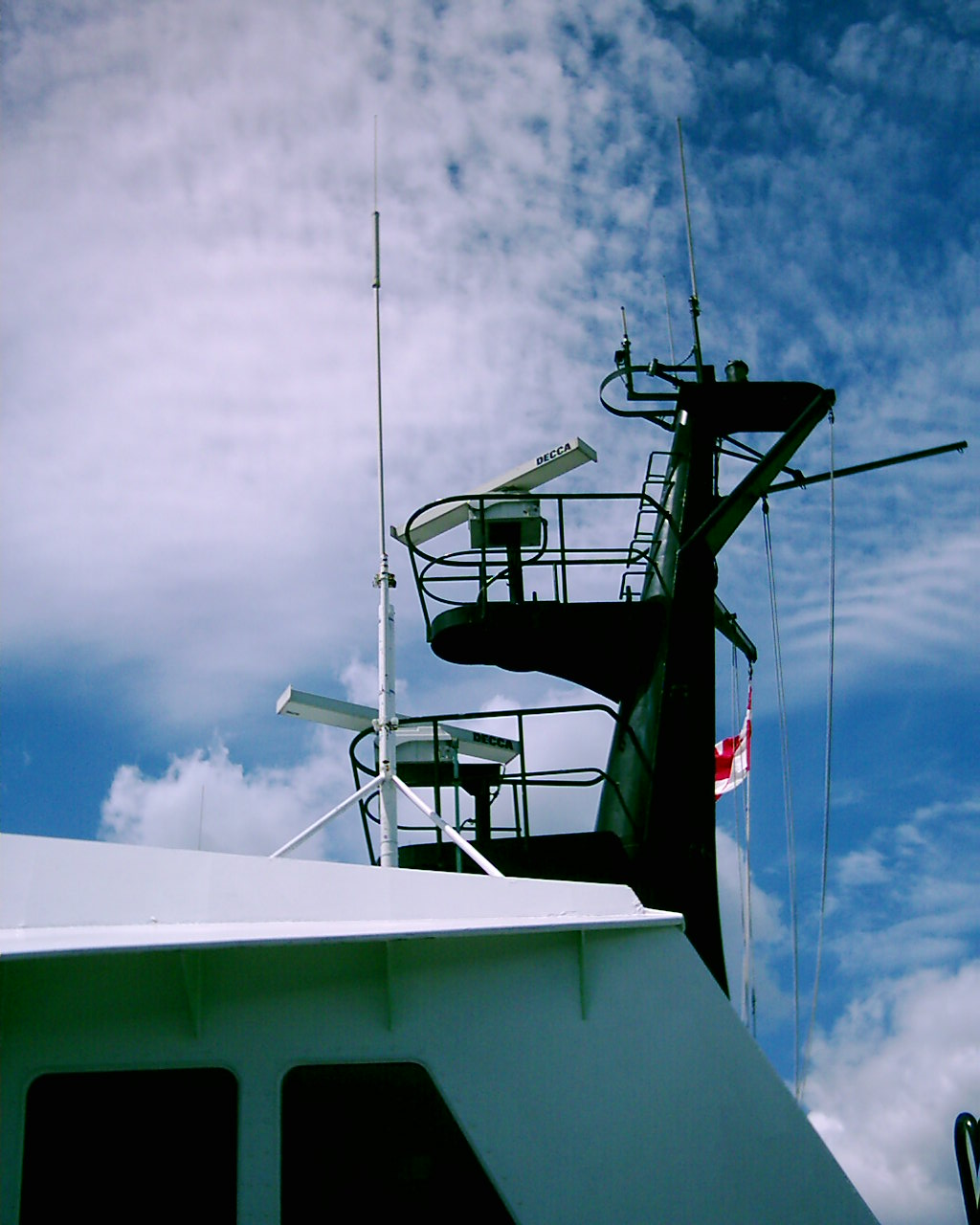
Decca BridgeMaster II turning units and antennas aboard a BC Ferries vessel in British Columbia, Canada

The Decca Radar company was a British manufacturer of radar systems. There were originally two divisions, Marine and Heavy Radar, with separate product lines. The latter was sold to Plessey in 1965, and the term "Decca Radar" normally refers to the Marine division. That division remained with Decca until 1979 when it was purchased by Racal to form Racal-Decca. After a series of further mergers and purchases, from 2000 the division is part of Northrop Grumman.

Decca is best known for its marine radars, starting with 1949's Type 159. Their most successful line was the 1970s Bridgemaster series which continued sales into the 2000s. Under Plessey, the company was particularly successful in the US pleasure boat market. The Heavy Radar division produced the AMES Type 80 radars for the Royal Air Force, and used that technology to develop the Decca HF200 height finder radar. This led to the Decca Air Surveillance Radar, which spawned a number of adaptations for civilian and military use.

== History ==
The Decca Company, a British gramophone manufacturer that, as Decca Records, released records under the Decca label, contributed to the British war effort during the Second World War. This military engineering activity resulted in a number of commercial ventures after the war, in particular, the Decca Navigator System, and the Decca Radar company.

Decca Radar launched its first marine radar, the 159, in August 1949. The radar was named after the number of the London bus that passed the Brixton laboratory where the radar was designed and manufactured. The company produced the first true motion radar (where the ship moves on the radar screen and the map is static in comparison where the map is moving and the ship is in the centre of the radar display), the first anti-collision radar and the first "Type Approved" colour radar. China, as the third-largest shipbuilder in the world, most ships it builds are equipped with navigation radars of Decca origin (either license-produced or directly imported).

In 1959 Racal Decca, as the company was known then, launched a number of social and sports clubs. Racal Decca RFC of Tolworth still operates today, and plays at Kingston University Ground in Tolworth, Surrey.

Decca Radar was bought in 1979 by Racal Electronics forming Racal-Decca Marine and related companies. Early Racal-Decca radars had dropped the Decca name, but it was later restored. At this time the business was run from New Malden in Surrey. In the mid-1980s, Decca introduced the BridgeMaster series of radars, which used a rasterized colour display. The BridgeMaster II series followed, with a Motorola 68000 CPU and software options like vector traces showing the trajectories of other ships as part of the automatic radar plotting aid package.

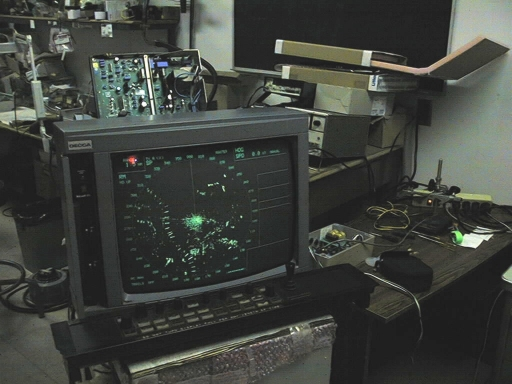
A Decca BridgeMaster II display being used to test a prototype video isolator.

In December 1996 the US corporation Litton Industries bought Racal-Decca Marine, as well as Sperry Marine and C.Plath, under the Litton Marine Systems name. The Decca name, engineering, and design continued to be used on the BridgeMaster II and, in 1998, the BridgeMaster E series of radars was launched. The Sperry section of Litton Marine Systems, based in Charlottesville, Virginia, was already producing its own line of marine radars, the Rascar, at the time of the acquisition but this was replaced by the BridgeMaster E. The Rascar had been the American-made radar used in the American Navy and Coast Guard but eventually the BridgeMaster E made inroads there as well. Competitors at the time included Gold Star and Furuno.

Northrop Grumman acquired Litton Industries in 2000 and this eventually heralded, in 2004, the end of the use of the Decca name on radars after a period of more than 50 years. In 2006 the VisionMaster FT series of marine radars replaced the aging BridgeMaster E series.
