= Lee K. Frankel =

American social worker (1867–1931)

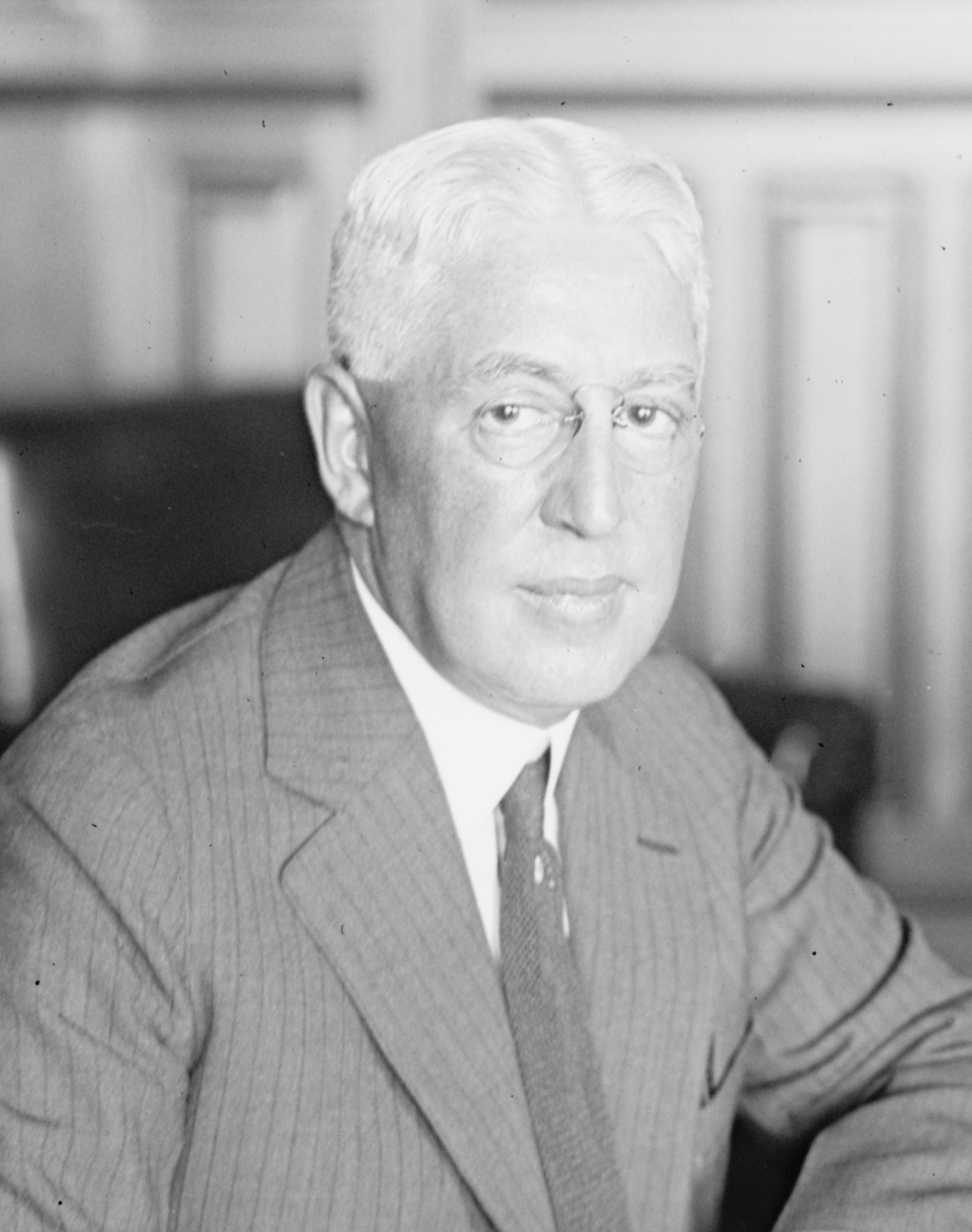
Frankel in 1921

Lee Kaufer Frankel (August 13, 1867 – July 25, 1931) was a Jewish-American social worker and insurance executive.

== Life ==
Frankel was born on August 13, 1867, in Philadelphia, Pennsylvania, the son of Louis Frankel and Aurelia Lobenberg. His father was a German immigrant who immigrated to America in 1850.

Frankel received a B.S. from the University of Pennsylvania in 1887 and a Ph.D. in 1891. He worked as an Instructor of Chemistry at the university from 1888 to 1893 and as an official chemist of the Retail Grocers' Association from 1896 to 1899. He became secretary of the Chemical Section of the Franklin Institute in 1895, vice-president in 1897, and president in 1898. He was also secretary of Congregation Rodeph Shalom from 1894 to 1899 and a director of the Jewish Chautauqua Society from 1897 to 1899. He was active in Jewish social work since at least 1894, when he became associated with the Baron de Hirsch Fund. His friendship with Rabbi Henry Berkowitz of Rodeph Shalom (where he taught at the Religious School) led him to participate in the Jewish Chautauqua Society (which Berkowitz founded), and later he led a series of summer assemblies on social work.

In 1899, Frankel moved to New York City, New York, to become manager of the United Hebrew Charities. He introduced professional social standards into Jewish philanthropy, stressed the importance of adequate relief towards rehabilitation, developed programs for dependents like mothers and for assisting migration to reduce the concentration of Jews in New York City. During his time there, he became interested in the potential for social insurance in the prevention and relief of poverty. The Russell Sage Foundation appointed him a special investigator in 1908, and in 1910 his investigations led him to published Workmen's Insurance in Europe, which he wrote with Miles M. Dawson and Louis I. Dublin. He also published a number of articles on health and welfare issues and coauthored several books, including The Human Factor in Industry in 1920, Health of the Worker, How to Safeguard It in 1924, and A Popular Encyclopedia of Health in 1926.

Frankel was assistant secretary of the New York State Conference of Charities and Corrections in 1901, an executive committee member in 1902, and vice-president in 1903. In 1903 President Theodore Roosevelt appointed him a member and secretary of the Ellis Island Commission. He was also assistant secretary of the National Conference of Charities and Corrections in 1902, in charge of the Summer School in Philanthropy for the Jewish Chautauqua Society in 1902 and 1903, and chairman of the Committee on Needy Families and their Homes for the National Conference of Charities and Corrections from 1905 to 1906. By 1905, he was chairman of the Committee on Needy Families for the New York State Conference of Charities and Corrections, a member of the Committee on Dependent Children for the National Conference of Jewish Charities, president of the Monday Club, a lecturer and member of the Faculty Council of the New York School of Philanthropy, a trustee of the Jewish Chautauqua Society, honorary vice-president of the Auxiliary Branch of the United Hebrew Charities of Philadelphia, and an editor of Jewish Charity. He also wrote articles on Jewish charity for The Jewish Encyclopedia and the Encyclopedia Americana.

Frankel worked for the United Hebrew Charities until 1908. His work with the Russell Sage Foundation led the Metropolitan Life Insurance Company to hire him in 1910 to organize a bureau for the welfare of working class policyholders in their industrial department. He quickly introduced an education campaign on personal health and hygiene and established a free nursing service for policy holders. He became second vice-president of Metropolitan in 1924 and served in that position until his death. He was president of the National Conference of Jewish Charities in 1912, a commissioner of the New York State Board of Charities from 1918 until his death, president of the American Public Health Association in 1919, director of welfare for the Post Office Department from 1921 to 1922, chairman of the special European commission of the American Jewish Relief Committee in 1922, chairman of the National Health Council from 1923 to 1926, and chairman of a commission to survey Palestine for the Jewish Agency in 1927. He was appointed a non-Zionist member of the Council of the Jewish Agency in 1929, and two weeks before his death he was elected co-chairman of the Council. He was also on the editorial board of the Universal Jewish Encyclopedia from 1928 until his death.

Frankel was a member of the National Association for the Study and Prevention of Tuberculosis, the American Social Hygiene Association, the National Organization for Public Health Nursing, and the Boy Scouts of America. He received an honorary Doctor of Jewish Law degree from Hebrew Union College in 1928. In 1898, he married Alice Reizenstein of Philadelphia. Their children were Lee Kaufer Jr. and Elinor Ruth (wife of Richard Rafalsky).

Frankel died at the Hôtel Le Bristol Paris in Paris, France, on July 25, 1931. He was in Europe as part of a study of social insurance in Europe. Over a thousand people attended his funeral at Congregation Emanu-El of New York, including around a hundred nurses from the Metropolitan Life Insurance Company, nurses from the Henry Street Settlement, and representatives from the American Public Health Association, the Joint Distribution Committee, the State Board of Social Welfare, and the Federation for the Support of Jewish Philanthropic Societies. Rabbi Nathan Krass of Congregation Emanu-El, Metropolitan Life Insurance Company vice-president Leroy A. Lincoln, and banker Felix M. Warburg delivered eulogies. He was buried in Mount Hope Cemetery in Westchester County.
