= Maria Kim =

Korean independence activist (1891–1944)

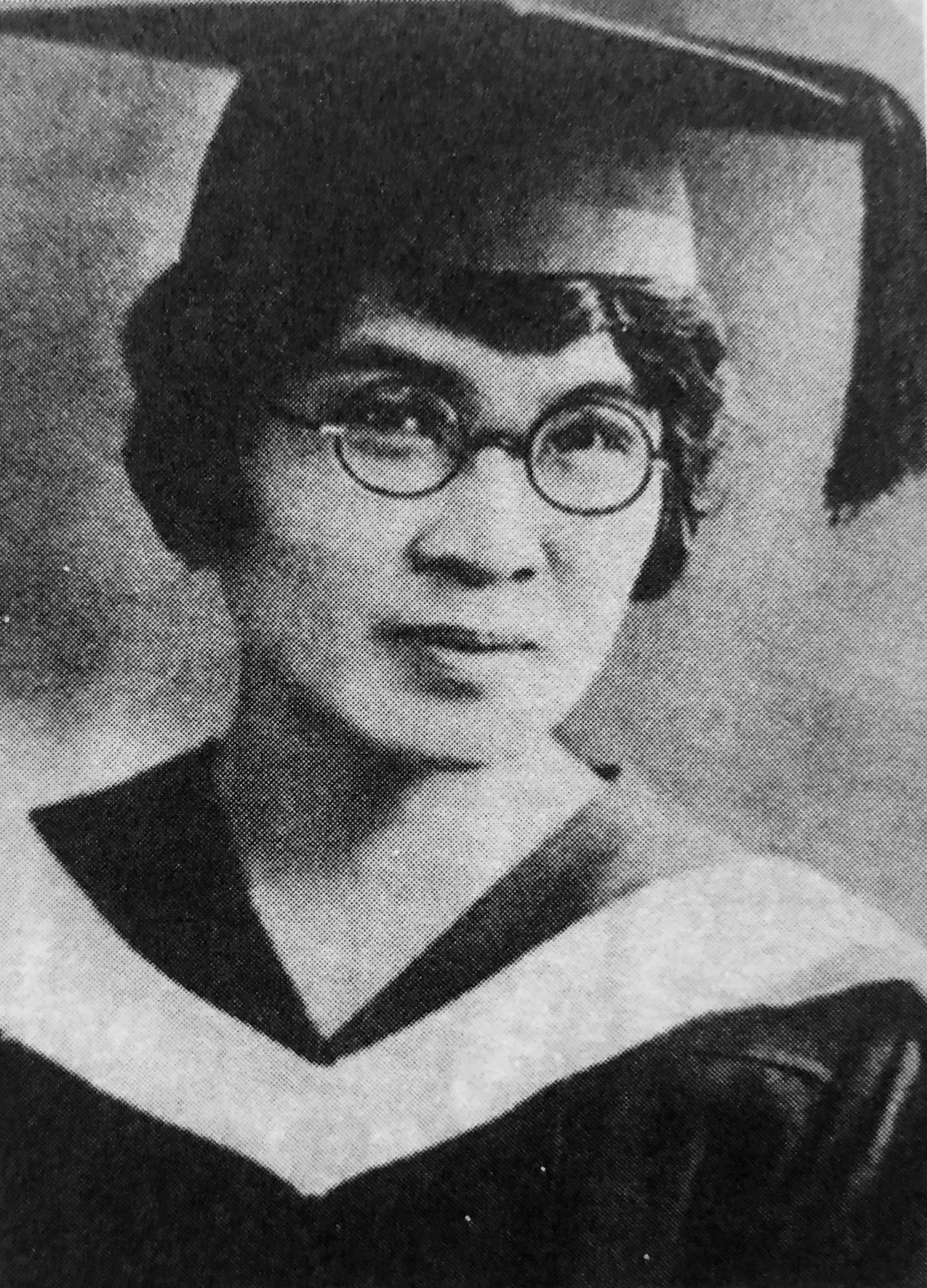
- Maria Kim
- Born: June 18, 1891; Changyon County, South Hwanghae Province, Joseon
- Died: March 13, 1944 (aged 52); Pyongyang, Heian'nan-dō, Korea, Empire of Japan
- Known for: Korean independence activist

Korean name
- Hangul: 김마리아
- Hanja: 金瑪利亞
- RR: Gim Maria
- MR: Kim Maria

Maria Kim (Korean: 김마리아; June 18, 1891 – March 13, 1944) was a Korean independence activist during the period of Japanese colonial rule (1910–1945). Her birth name was Kim Jin-sang (金眞常) and she also went by the name Kim Geun-po (金槿圃).

She was commemorated in a poem by fellow independence activist Yi Gwangsu. In 1968 she was posthumously awarded Korea's the Order of Independence Merit, and in 1992 was designated the Independence Activist of the Month for the month of July.

== Biography ==
=== Early life ===
Maria Kim was the third child born to Yun-bang Kim and Mong-eun Kim, landowners in Jangyeon county in South Hwanghae province. Her father, Yun-bang, started attending church at an early age was an educational pioneer, establishing an elementary school in his hometown. He was Presbyterian and helped form the Sorae Presbyterian Church and had Maria baptized when she was young. However, he died while Maria Kim was young. Maria Kim later graduated from Sorae Normal School, the school that her father established, but soon afterward her mother also died, so she was left in uncle's care.

Maria Kim's household is well known for its nationalistic consciousness. Her uncle, Seo Byeong-ho and his son, Seo Jae-hyeon were independence activists within the Provisional Government of the Republic of Korea, and Maria Kim was also the niece of independence activist Kim Sun-ae, who was the wife of Kim Gyusik. Her uncle Pilsun Kim, who graduated from Severance Medical School, would later become a close associate of Roh Baeng-in, Yu Dong-yeol, Yi Dongyeo, and Kim Kyu-sik, who formed the provisional oppositional government. Thus while attending Yeondong Women's School, Maria Kim was influenced by the nationalistic consciousness of her uncle's household.

In 1910 Maria Kim graduated from Yeondong Women's School and worked at both Yeondong and Sophia Women's School. In 1914 she departed as an exchange student to Japan, traveling to Tokyo via Hiroshima, and enrolled at Tokyo Women's Academy. While in Tokyo, Kim was mentored spiritually by an American Christian missionary named Miss London.

=== Korean independence activism ===
==== February 8, 1919 ====
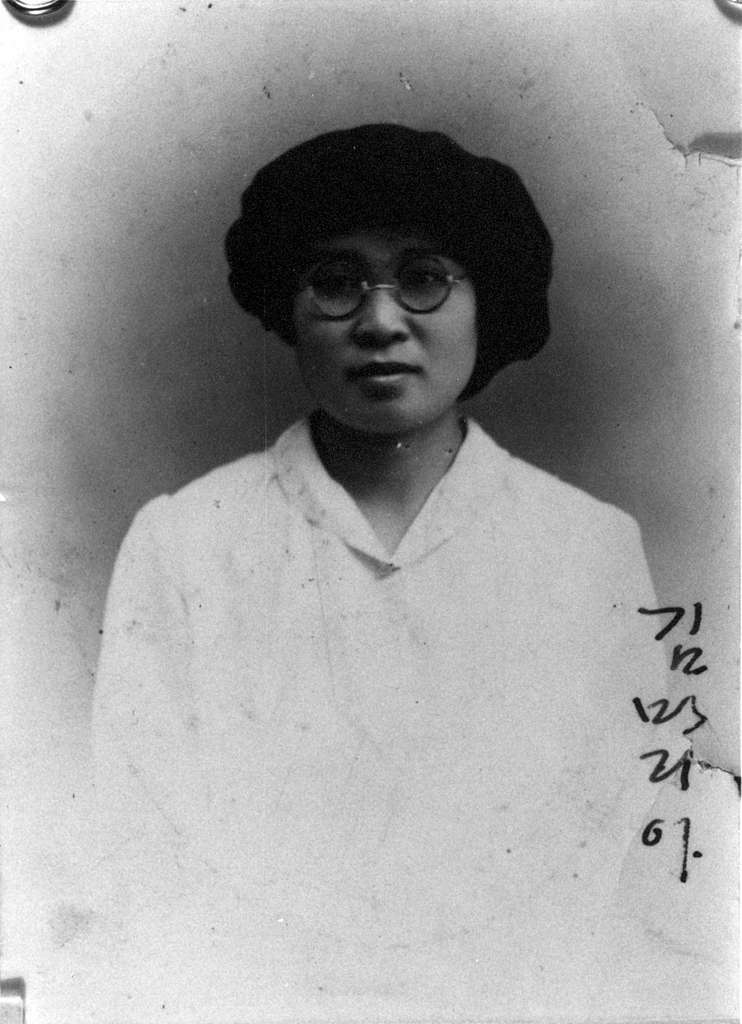
Maria Kim in 1919

In 1919, shortly before graduating from Tokyo Women’s Academy, Kim actively participated with others, like Hwang Aedeok, in the independence movement that followed the promulgation of the February 8 Declaration of Independence, a statement drafted by Korean foreign exchange students in Japan. Kim was one of many students who gathered outside of the Korean YMCA in Tokyo, Japan, and demonstrated against the Japanese murder of King Kojong and the annexation of Korea. She was arrested by Japanese police and tortured for 8 hours before being released.

==== Declaration of Independence ====
When Kim left Tokyo after graduation she returned to Korea. She hid a copy of the February 8 Independence Declaration and brought it with her. This February Independence Declaration inspired the Korean Declaration of Independence. Both declarations also are similar because they were made for the same international audience and were anchored by the same concept of self-determination.

==== March 1, 1919 ====
When the March 1st Movement broke out later the same year, Kim participated in anti-Japanese protest. Leading up to the March 1st protest, she organized female students and teachers and mobilized their participation. For her involvement, she was subsequently arrested and detained. During this period, she was subjected to torture, and she suffered health problems throughout her life as a result.

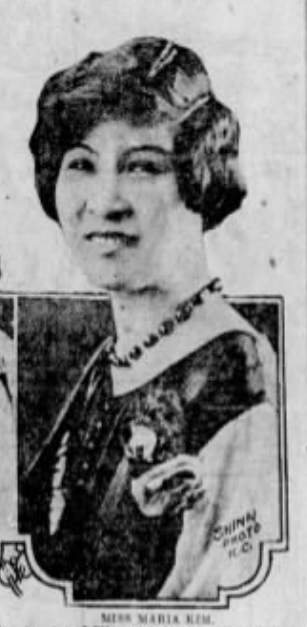
Image of Maria Kim in the Kansas City Star newspaper, 1926

==== Korean Patriotic Women's Association ====
After being released from prison in August 1919, she united various women’s groups together to create the Korean Patriotic Women’s Association. She was elected president and under her leadership, the groups went from raising funds for male leaders to working to doing their own independence work. They published booklets containing pictures of the independence movement and distributed them to other nations. They collected facts and information on the happenings of the independence movement. Additionally, women of the group volunteered, taught, and were nurses, further adding to society. One of the Association’s members betrayed them and reported the group to Japan. More than 1000 women were arrested, including Kim.

Maria Kim was sentenced to three years’ imprisonment for her involvement in the Korean Patriotic Women’s Association. While in prison she led prayer meetings so powerful that reportedly, “the sound of praise echoed in the prison”. Because her permanent lesions from torture she was granted medical leave, and with the help of American missionaries escaped to Shanghai. In Shanghai, she became the representative of Hwanghae province and enrolled in Nanjing’s Jinling College.

==== The United States ====
In 1923, she left Shanghai and traveled to the United States. She studied at Park College and the University of Chicago as a foreign exchange student, earning a master's degree. While there, she spoke before international relations forum of the American Association of University Women about Korean independence. She then and left for New York to study theology. In New York, she helped establish the Keunhwahoe, a patriotic Korean association for women, along with fellow exchange students Bak In-deok, Hwang Ae-deok, among others. She also spoke at Plymouth Church and the talk was titled “What Christianity Means to Me-A Korean.”

=== Return to Korea and death ===
In 1933, she returned to Korea, but was prohibited from residing in the Seoul area and from teaching in any position outside of theology by Japanese authorities. She worked as a teacher at Martha Wilson Seminary, but the injuries sustained from torture resurfaced and she collapsed in her home. She died in 1944 in a Pyongyang hospital. She was unmarried and left no relatives, and was cremated and her ashes were cast over the Taedong River.

== Mentions in media ==
Maria Kim was mentioned in newspapers in the United States as well as Soh Jaipil's journal, Korea Review. Kim was portrayed by actress Kim Ae-gyeong in the 1981―82 TV series 1st Republic.

=== Newspapers ===
==== The Sacramento Bee ====
"The Korean Commission here has received a report from Dr. Frank W. Schofield, a Canadian medical missionary in Korea, who is home on a furlough, which reads: Maria Kim (a young girl student and graduate of the Presbyterian Mission School in Seoul, who had been arrested for the second time because of her connection with the independence movement) has been sentenced to three years' imprisonment at hard labor. She has been very seriously ill for some time as a result of the treatment she had received in prison and was (at the time of writing) undergoing an operation before recommencing her prison life. (It is doubtful whether she will live.)"

=== Korea Review ===
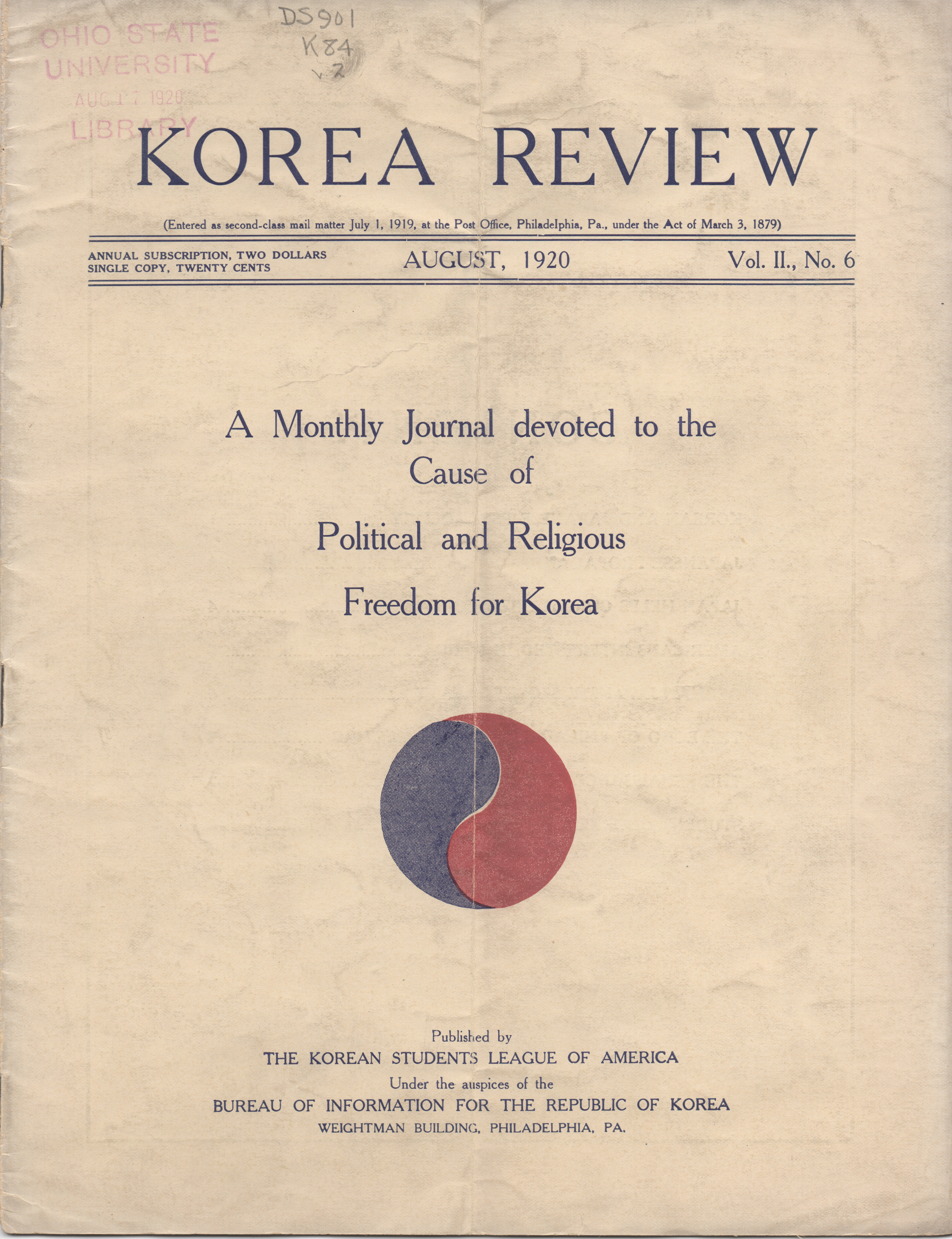
Cover of a publication of Korea Review, Soh Jaipil's Journal. The journal reported on the Independence Movement and its foot soldiers, including Maria Kim

==== Vol. I. No. 6 ====
“Maria Kimm [sic], a young woman of twenty-five years of age, whom I have known from a child, is now locked up in the inner prison. She is a beautiful type of the Orient, with dark eyes and dreamy lashes, such as only the hidden vistas of Asia ever see. For some years she has lived in Japan, and speaks the language like a native tongue. What is her sin? The same as that which sent Madame Breshkovaky to the salt mines of Siberia-she is a patriot and would give her life to ace Korea free. Maria knew what others suffered before she went, but that must not interfere with her contribution to the cause. She choose Tennyson's line: "The thumbscrew and the stake for the glory of the Lord."

==== Vol. II. No. 7 ====
"Miss Maria Kimm, a Christian young woman of Taiku, has been arrested with other Korean girls on the charge of seditious action against the Japanese government. She was sentenced to three years' imprisonment with hard labor. Maria Kimm is known to many American missionaries in Korea as being one of the committed Christian workers. She is educated and has been doing evangelical work, and educational institutions in Seoul and other cities. One more martyr among Korean womanhood!"
