= First Korean Congress =

1919 meeting in Philadelphia, United States

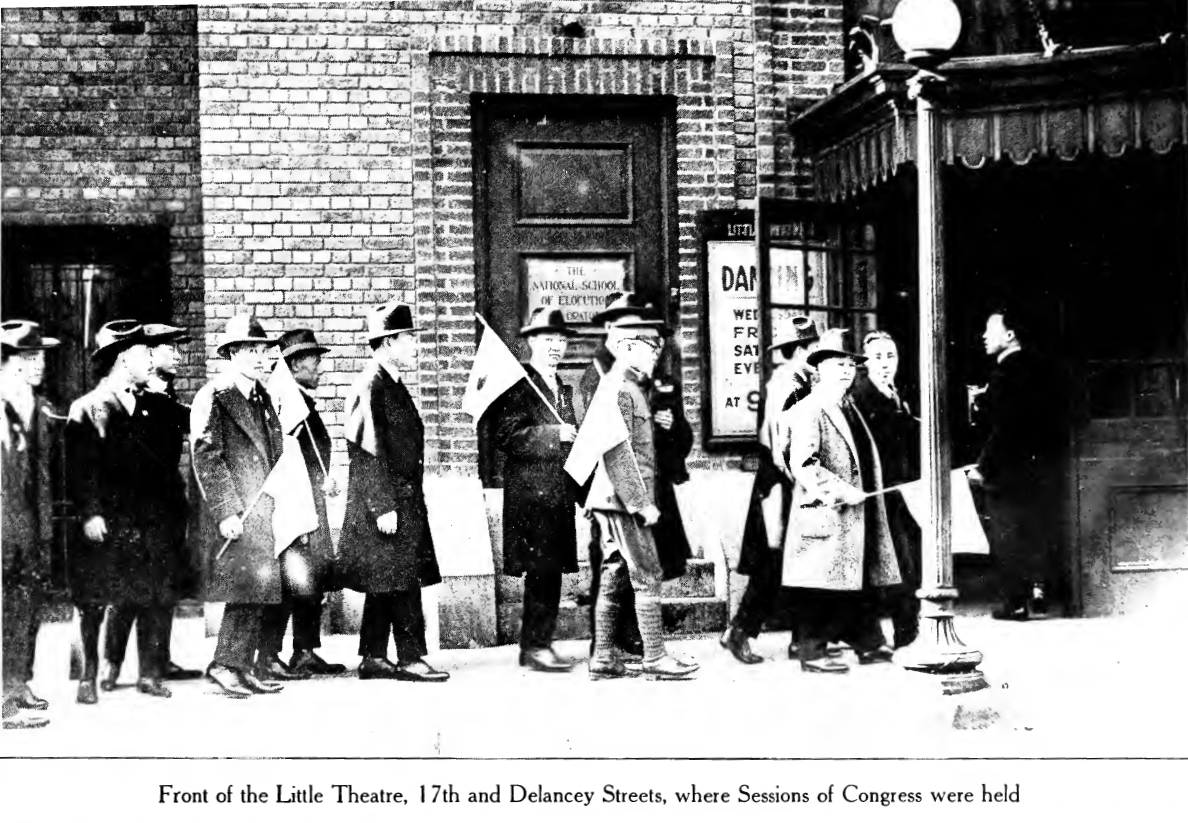
Delegates of the First Korean Congress in front of Little Theater, Philadelphia, 1919

The First Korean Congress (Korean: 제1차 한인자유대회) was a conference in support of the independence of Korea, then a colony of Japan. It was convened by Philip Jaisohn in Philadelphia from April 14 to 16, 1919 in the Little Theater.

The Congress was a reaction to the March 1st Movement, one of the earliest public displays of Korean resistance during the Japanese rule of Korea. It was inspired by President Woodrow Wilson and his "Fourteen Points" outlining the right of national "self-determination" proclaimed at the Paris Peace Conference in January 1919. Between 800,000-2,000,000 Koreans had participated in more than 1,500-1,800 demonstrations during the March First Movement, and several thousand protestors were massacred by the Japanese police force and army.

The aim of the First Korean Congress was to gain American support at the Paris Peace Conference in favor of Korean independence. This goal was not attained because Wilson was not interested in challenging global power relations as Japan was one of the victors of World War I, so Korean independence was not discussed.

== Attendance to the conference ==
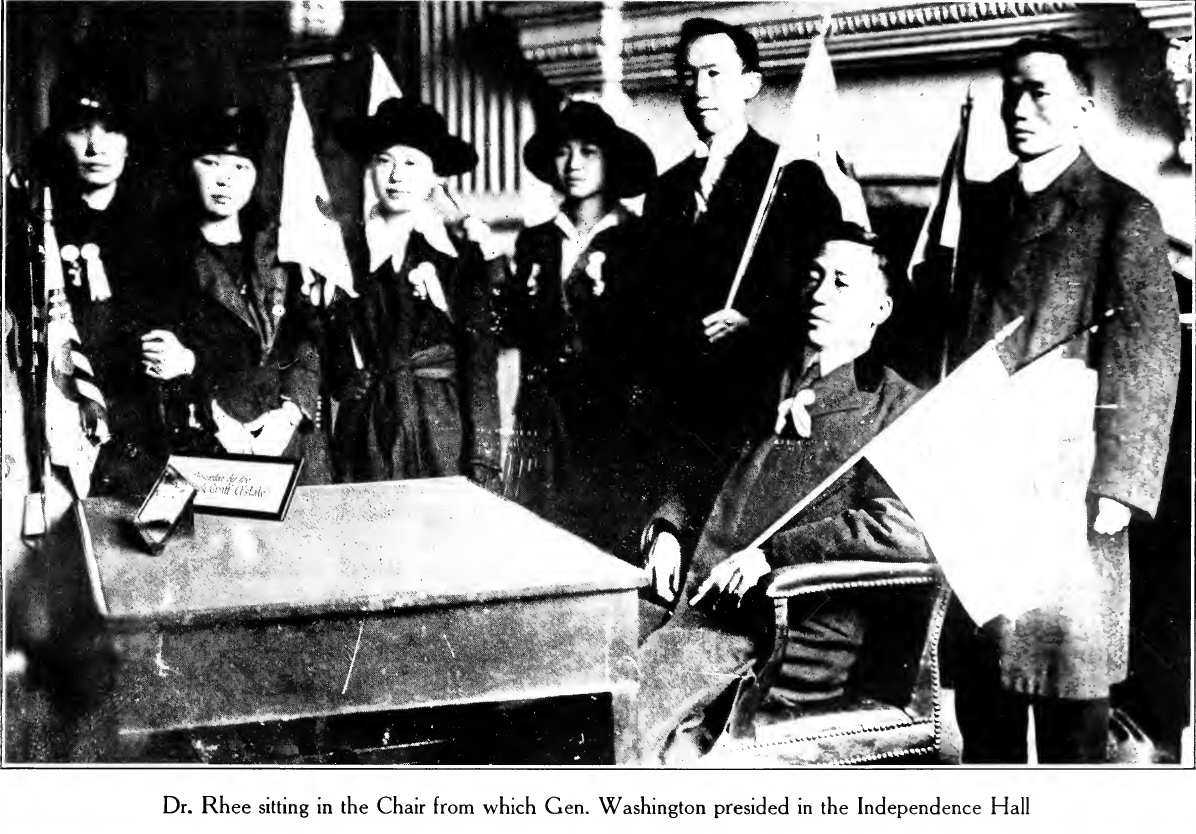
Dr. Rhee in Phliladelphia Independence Hall in 1919 after the First Korean Congress

The conference was presided by Philip Jaisohn, the first Korean to receive American citizenship, who convened a meeting of Korean expatriates, immigrants, and Korean sympathizers in Philadelphia. Over two hundred delegates from New York, Ohio, Illinois, Michigan, Missouri, Wyoming, Nebraska, Iowa, Colorado, California, Pennsylvania and one from London came to attend the congress.

One of the notable attendees was Dr. Syngman Rhee, who was chosen as one of the Korean representatives to the Paris Peace Conference, 1919 by the Korean National Association (대한인 국민회; 大韓人國民會), but failed to obtain permission to travel to Paris.

The conference was opened by a prayer and a speech of Rev. Floyd W. Tomkins, rector of the Church of the Holy Trinity, Philadelphia in Rittenhouse Square and president of the Philadelphia Chapter of League of Friends of Korea.

== The Conference ==
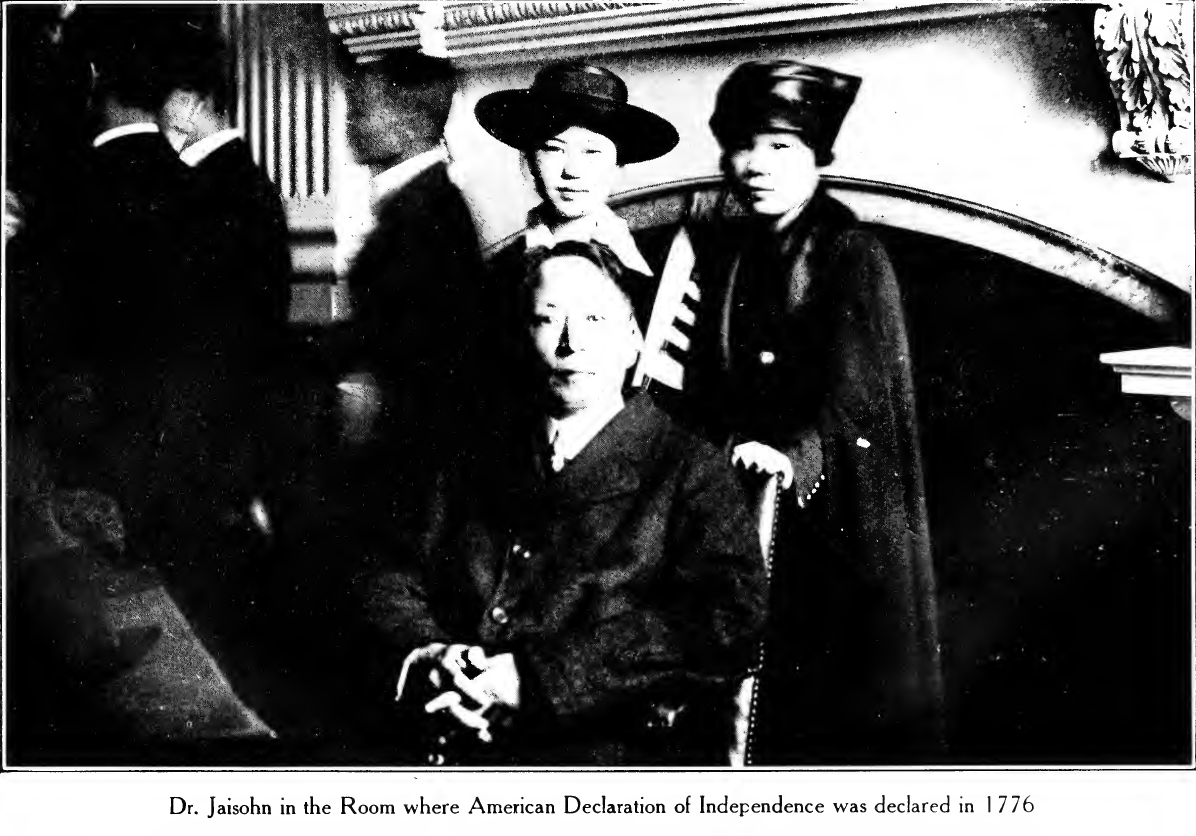
Dr, Jaisohn in Phliladelphia Independence Hall in 1919 after the First Korean Congress

In the morning of first day there were the speeches by

- President Jaisohn
- Miss Nodie Dora Kim, student in Oberlin College, Ohio, post-war minister in Korea
- Prof. Herbert A. Miller, professor of sociology in Oberlin College, Ohio
- Prof. Alfred J. G. Schadt

In the afternoon of the first day a message was approved for the Provisional Government of the Republic of Korea to “declare that we pledge the moral, material and physical support to the cause of our country’s freedom”.

An "Appeal to America" was also approved asking the Government of United States to “exert its good offices to save the lives of our freedom-loving brethren in Korea and to protect the American missionaries and their families who are in danger of losing their lives and property on account of their love for our people and their faith in Christ. We further ask you, the great American public, to give us your moral and material help so that our brethren in Korea will know that your sympathy is with them and that you are truly the champions of liberty and international justice.”

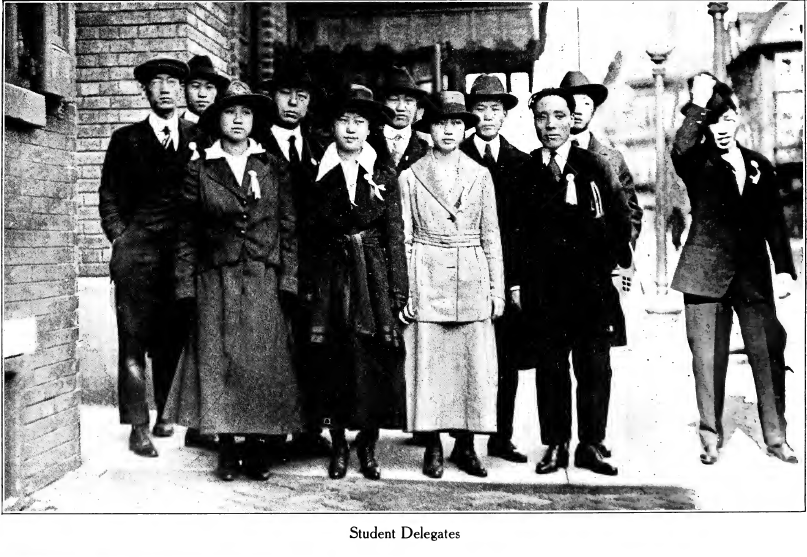
Student delegates at the First Korean Congress in Philadelphia, 1919

The congress adopted a resolution on the “Aims and Aspirations of the Koreans” which proposed a government modeled after that of America, freedom of religion, free commerce with all nations of the world, education of the people, modern sanitary improvements, free speech and press, liberty of action on all matters provided thy do not interfere with the rights of other people or conflict with the laws and interests of the nations.

In the morning of the second day the Catholic Rev. Father James J. Dean, president of Villanova College, offered a prayer and an address.

A committee prepared a "Message to the Thinking People of Japan" asking to give freedom to Korea. "You will find that Korea will develop into a peaceful, democratic and industrial nation, which will be absolutely neutral in her foreign policies, will be a buffer between your country, China and Russia. The interest of your country requires a friendly buffer state in this region instead of a territory inhabited by sullen, resentful people in whose hearts hatred for you and your government will always exist as long as you try to govern them by force, cruelty and injustice."

In the morning of the third day Rabbi Henry Berkowitz gave a prayer and a speech on behalf of the Jewish Community of Philadelphia. He was followed by Reverend Croswell McBee, Rector of St. John's Church, Lansdowne, Pa.

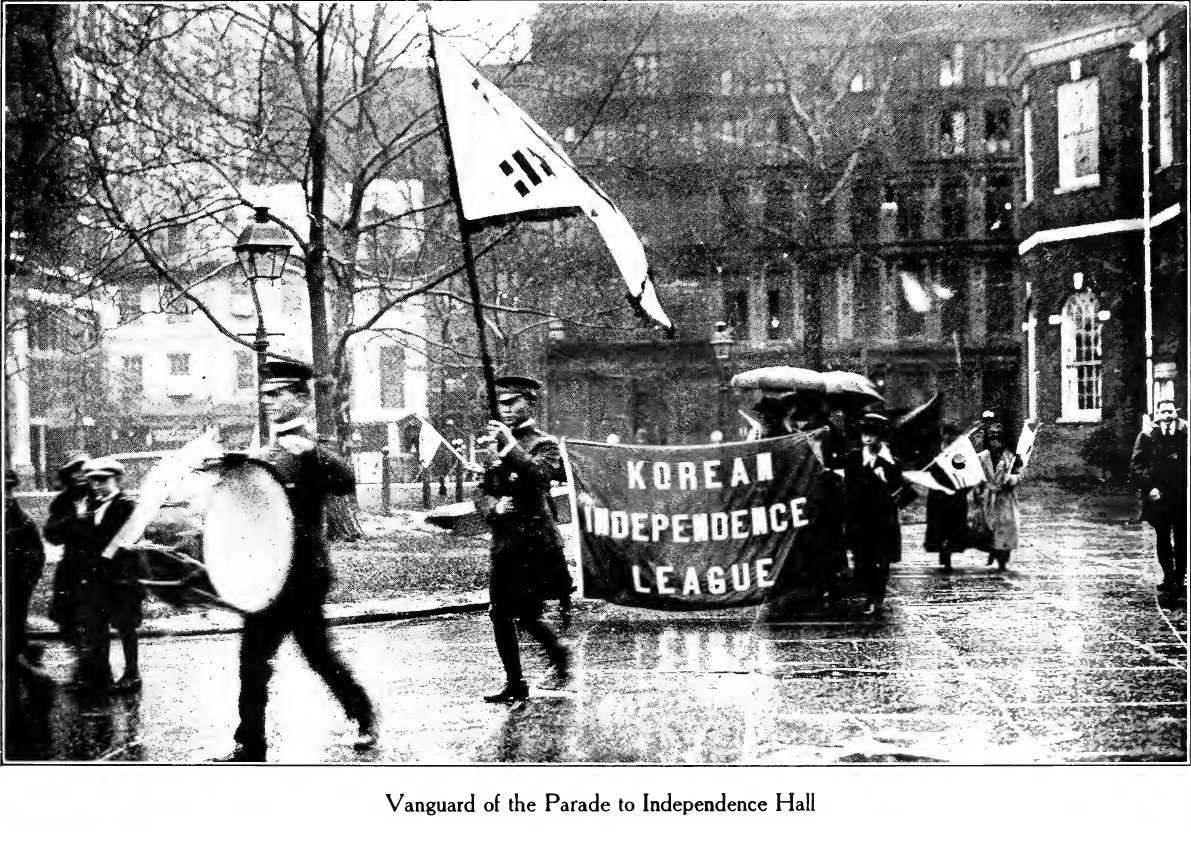
Parade after the First Korean Congress in Philadelphia, 1919

Rev. Tomkins read a communication from the Federation of Churches signed by Dr. MacFarland "proclaiming that the Federation of Churches and the ministers of that body in the United States will stand up in an appeal to the world to make every country independent and free, and that includes Korea."

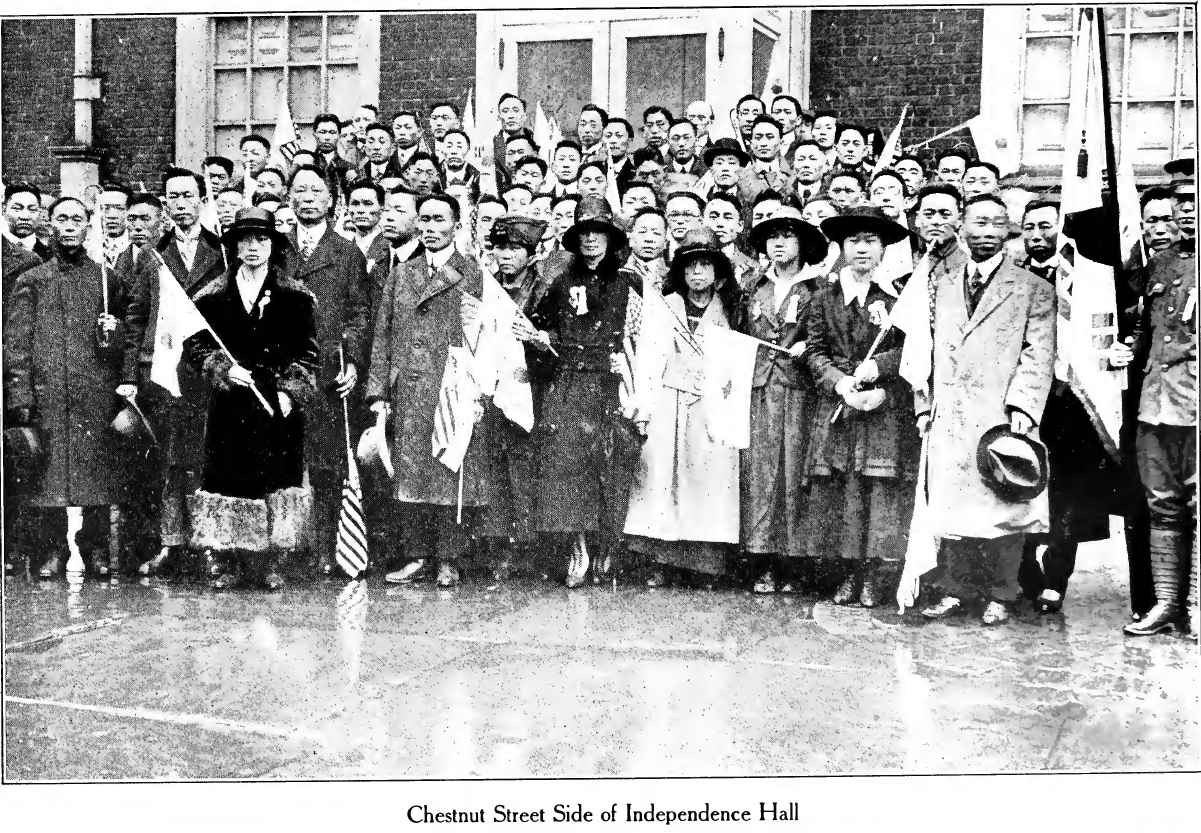
First Korean Congress delegates in front of Independence Hall (Chestnut Street Side) in Philadelphia, 1919

Dr. Clarence E. Macartney, one of the leading ministers of the Christian Church in the City of Philadelphia, gave a speech in support of the Korean cause. At the end Rev. C. H. Min offered a prayer in Korean.

After the Conference there was a parade across Philadelphia from the Theater to Independence Hall, where the Independence of America was declared and signed, each man and woman carrying a Korean and American flag. Dr. Syngman Rhee read in the Hall the Korean Declaration of Independence by the Provisional Government of the Republic of Korea on March 1, 1919. After the reading of the Korean Declaration of Independence, the delegates formed in line and as each man passed the Liberty Bell he touched it with his right hand.

== The League of Friends of Korea ==
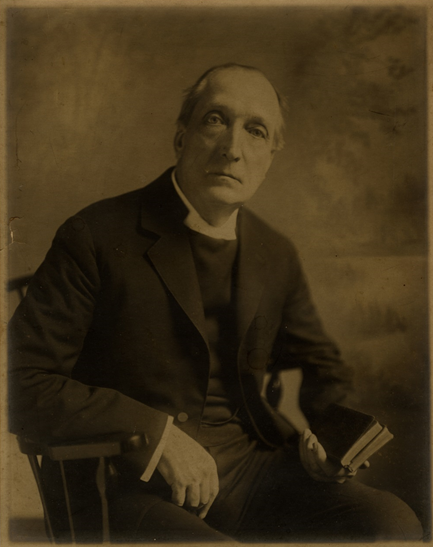
Reverend Floyd W. Tompkins, one of the founders and the president of the Philadelphia branch of the League of Friends of Korea

The League of Friends of Korea was an organization that was created during the First Korean Congress. The first branch of the League was founded by Reverend Floyd W. Tomkins and George Benedict in Philadelphia. The League spread quickly gaining branches in many U.S. cities including Washington D.C., Chicago, and New York City. The branches of the League hosted mass meetings where they would educate members on the situation in Korea. Meetings featured multiple lectures from members along with the development of new branches. Meetings often led to participants sending resolutions to Congress asking for action from the U.S. government to show sympathy for the Korean people. The details of various mass meetings of the League of Friends of Korea were published in the Korea Review, a magazine written by Korean American activist Philip Jaisohn. The objectives of the League as seen in their first resolution were:

“To inform the American public as to the true conditions in the Far East. To extend sympathy and encouragement to the oppressed people of Korea in their struggle for freedom. To use its moral influence to prevent the recurrence of cruel treatment to which the Koreans have been subjected. To secure religious liberty to the Korean Christians.”

== Legacy ==
A centennial celebration of the congress was held at the Little Theater in Philadelphia on April 12–14, 2019, which was attended by more than a thousand people. The Council of the City of Philadelphia recognized the centennial celebration.

== Gallery of images ==
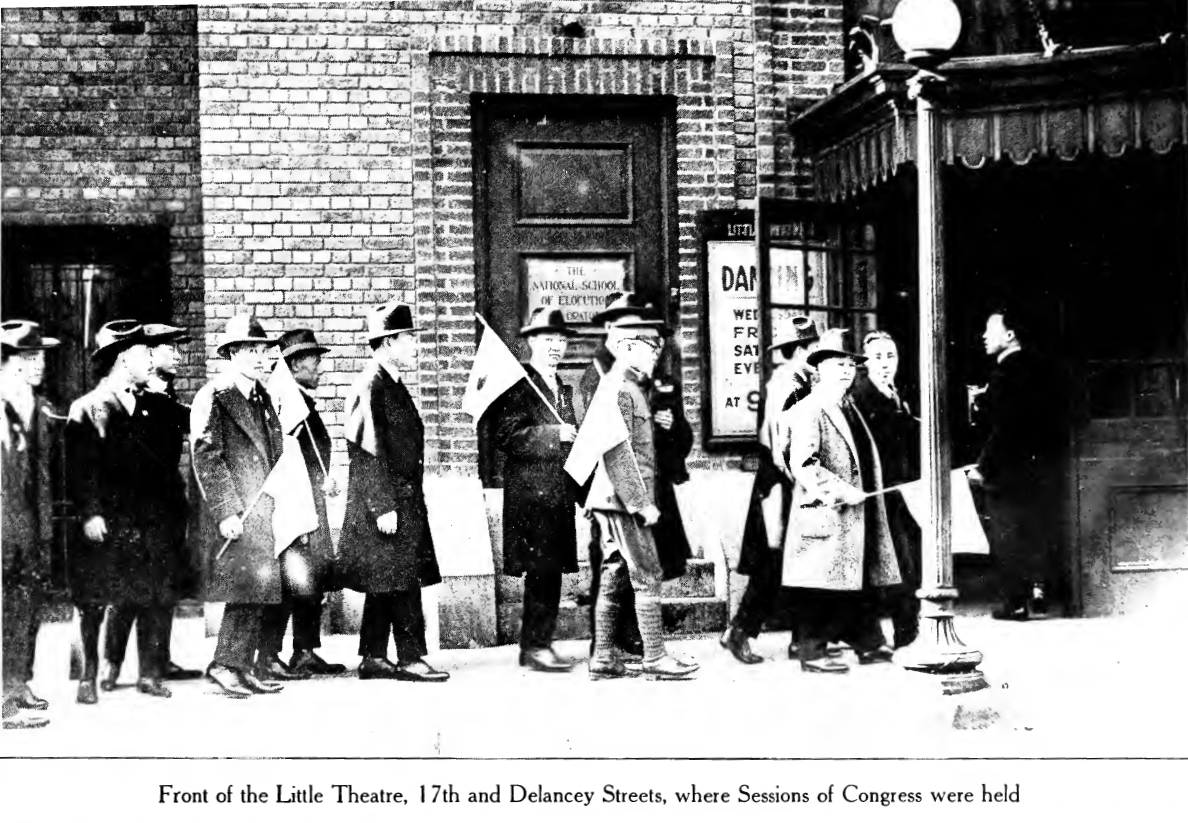
Delegates in front of the Little Theater

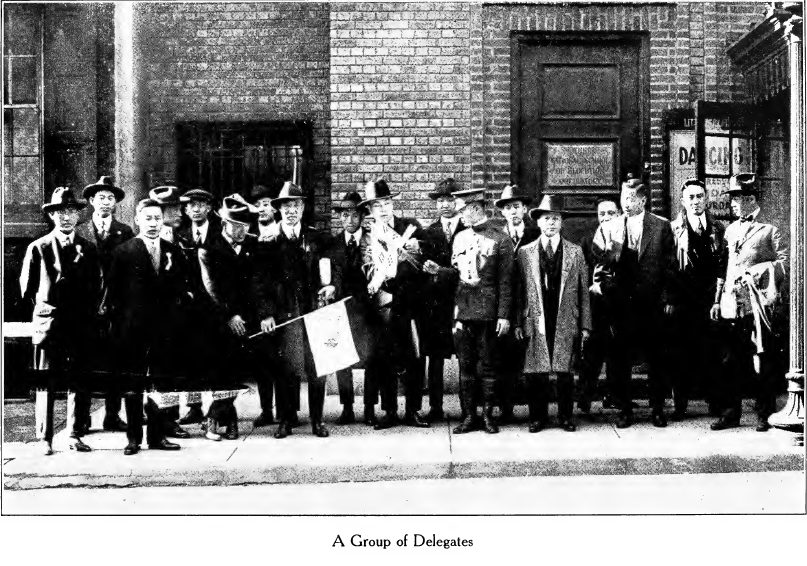
Delegates

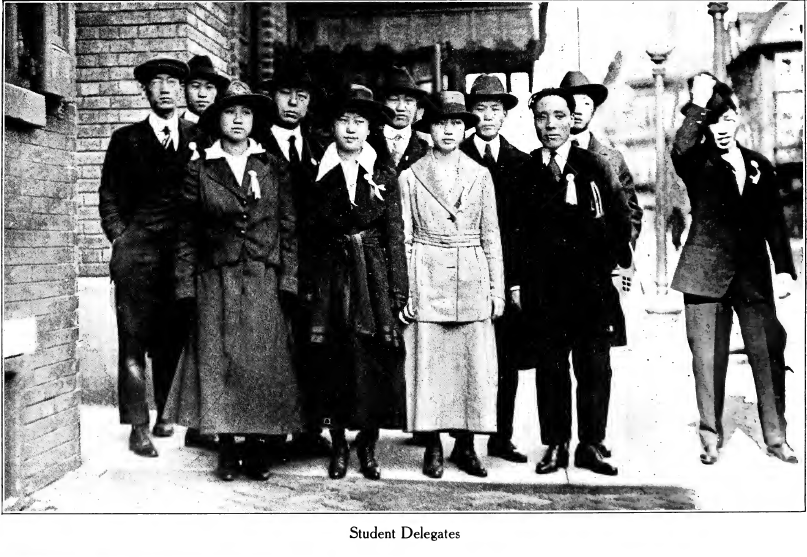
Student Delegates

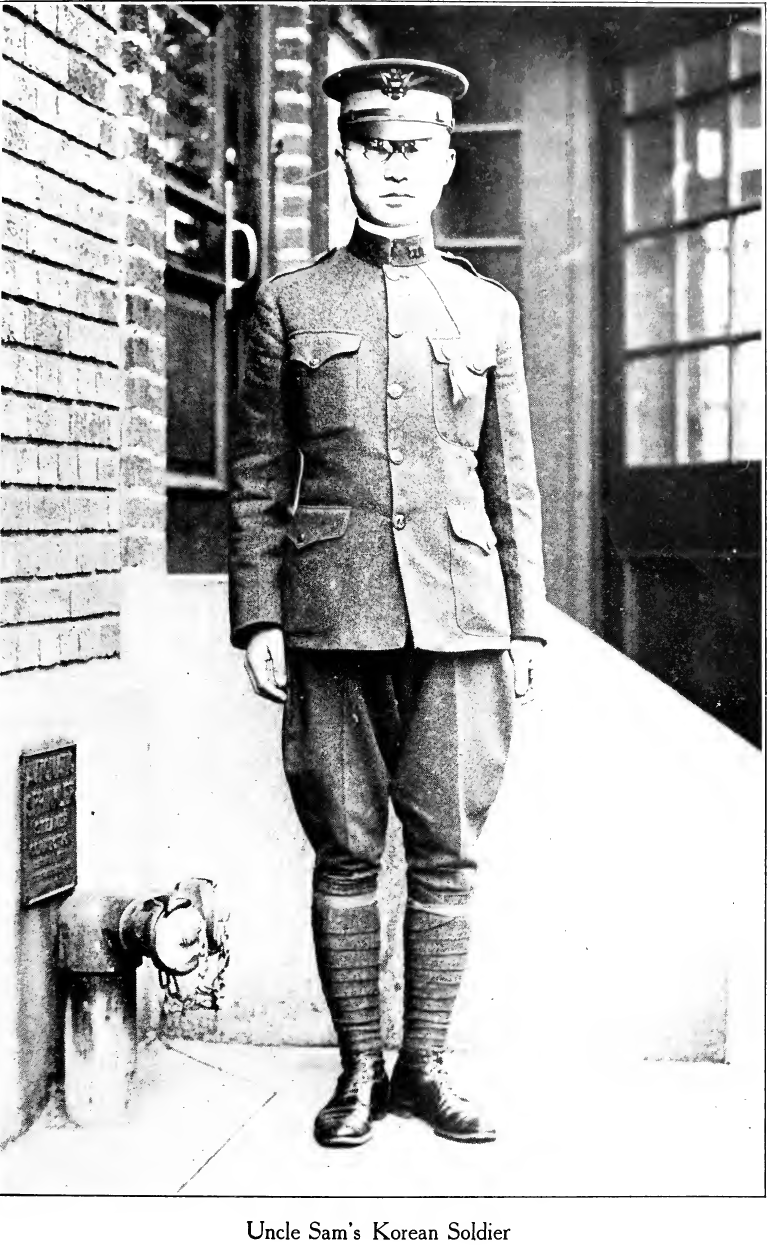
Uncle Sam’s Korean Soldier

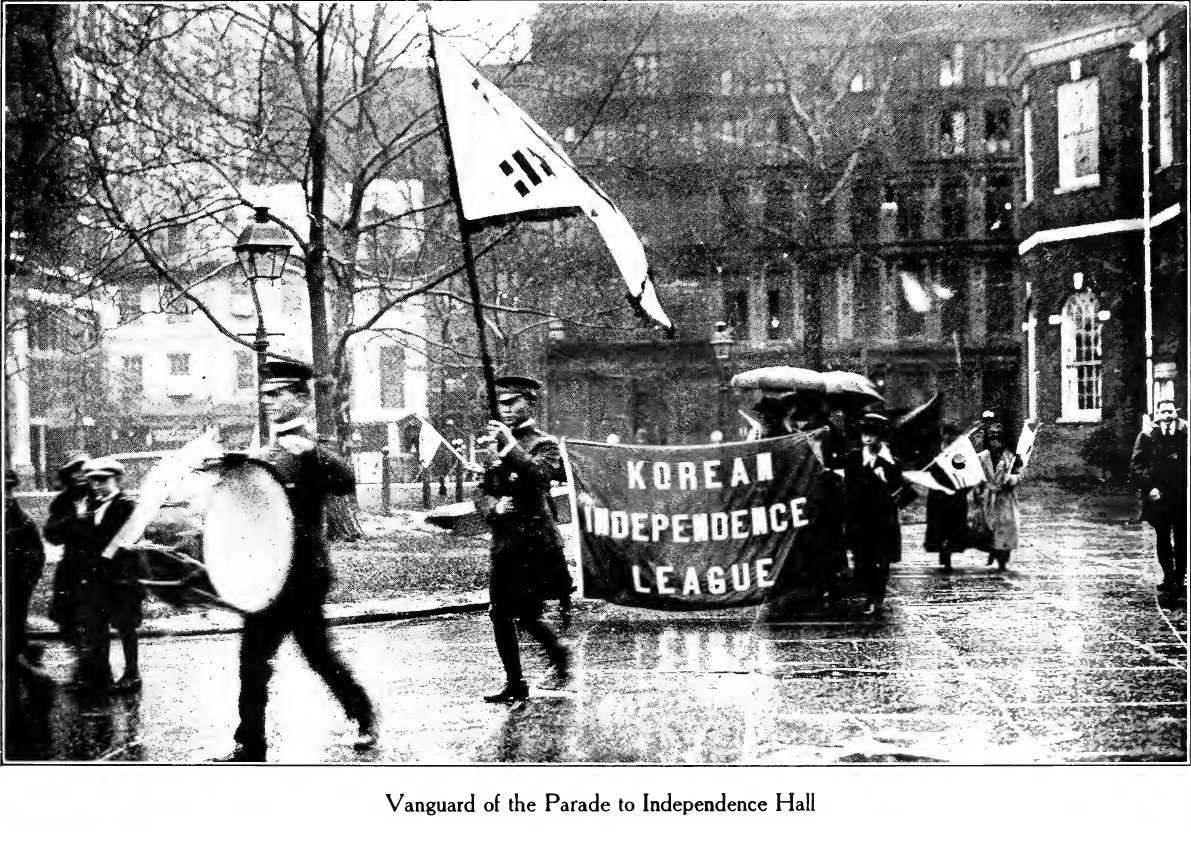
Parade on Independence Square behind Independence Hall

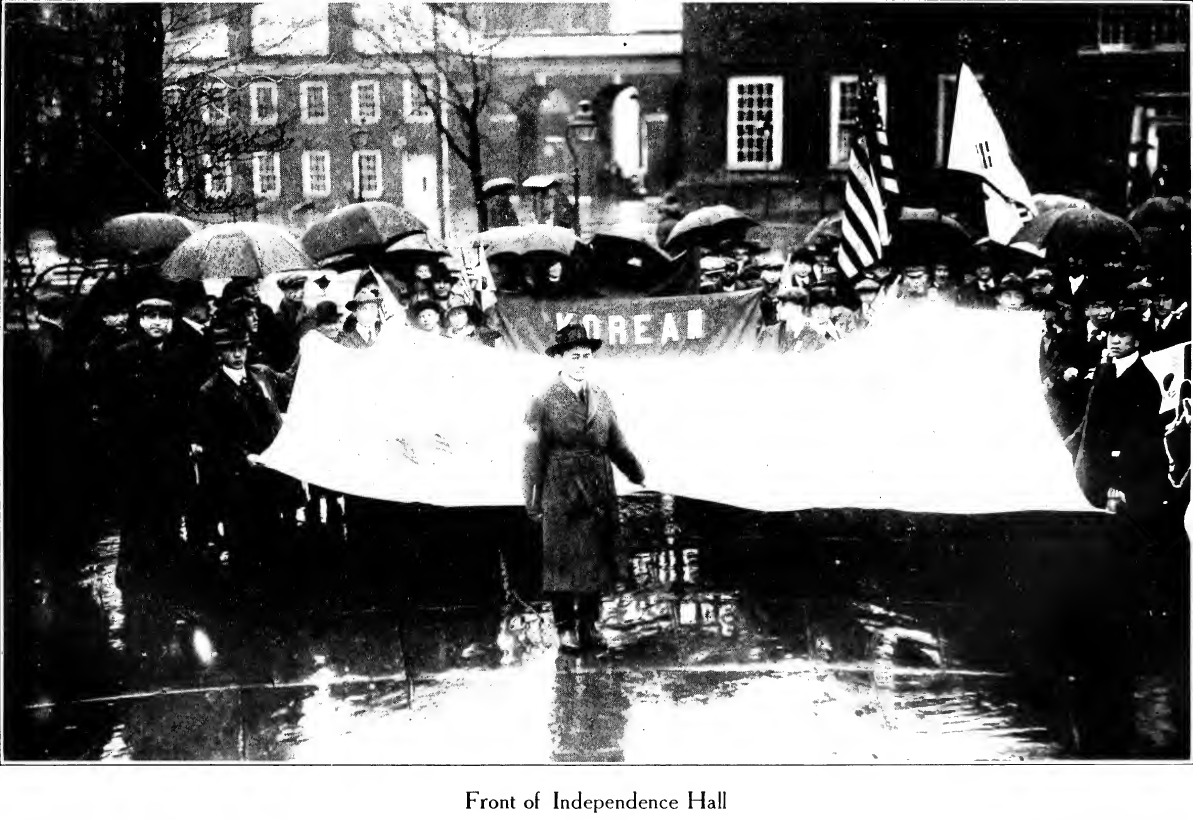
On Independence Hall behind Independence Hall

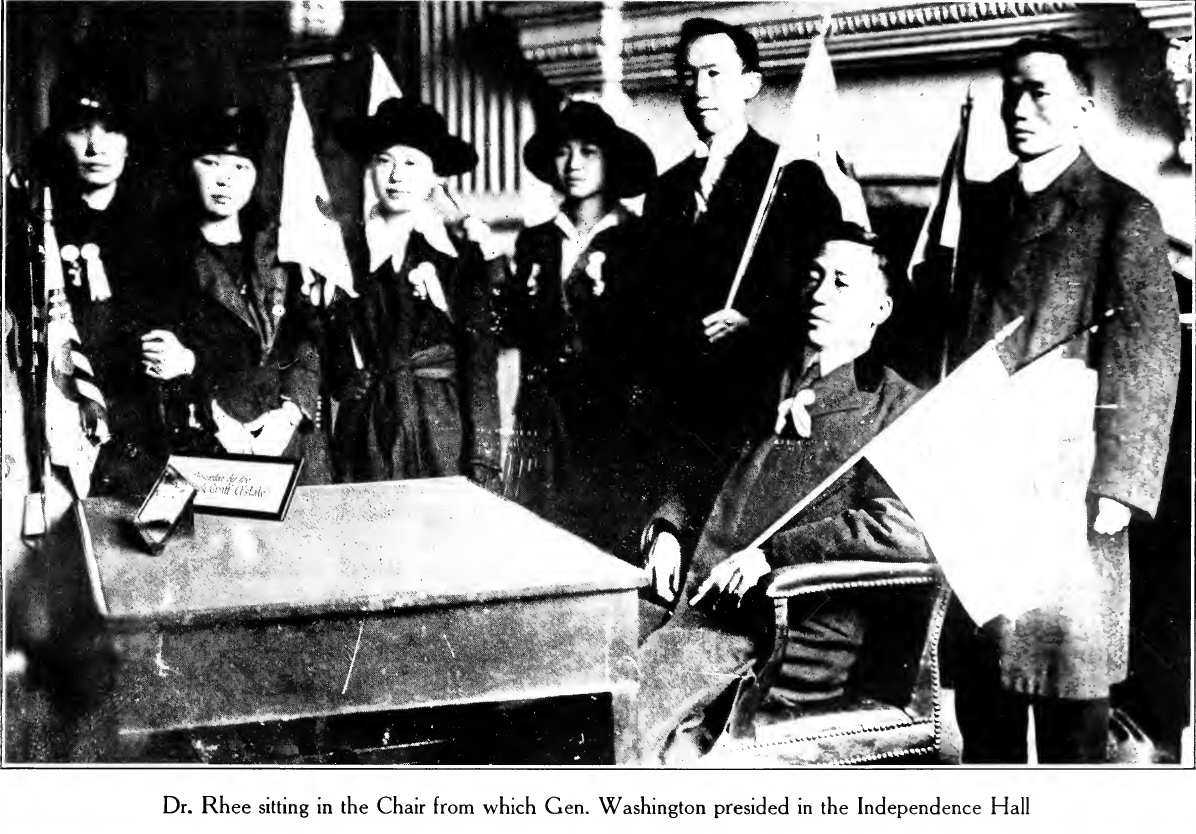
Dr. Rhee

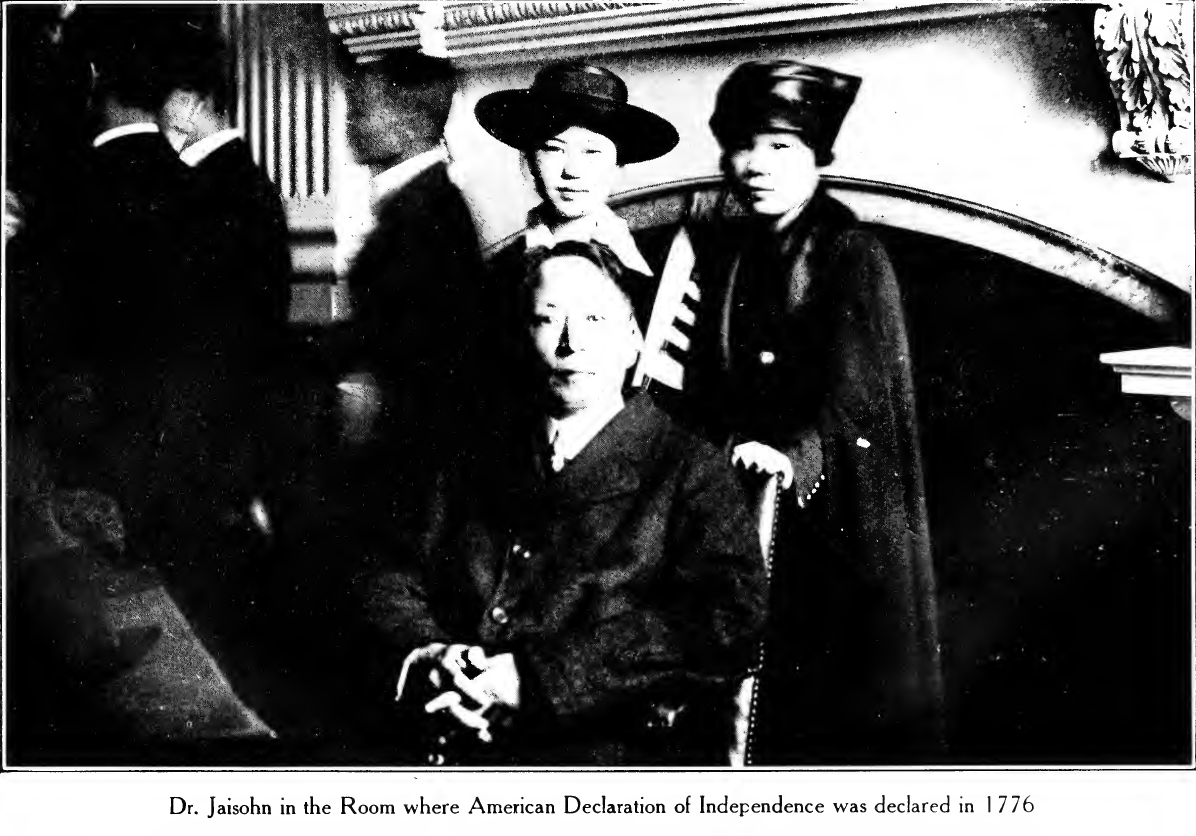
Dr. Jaisohn

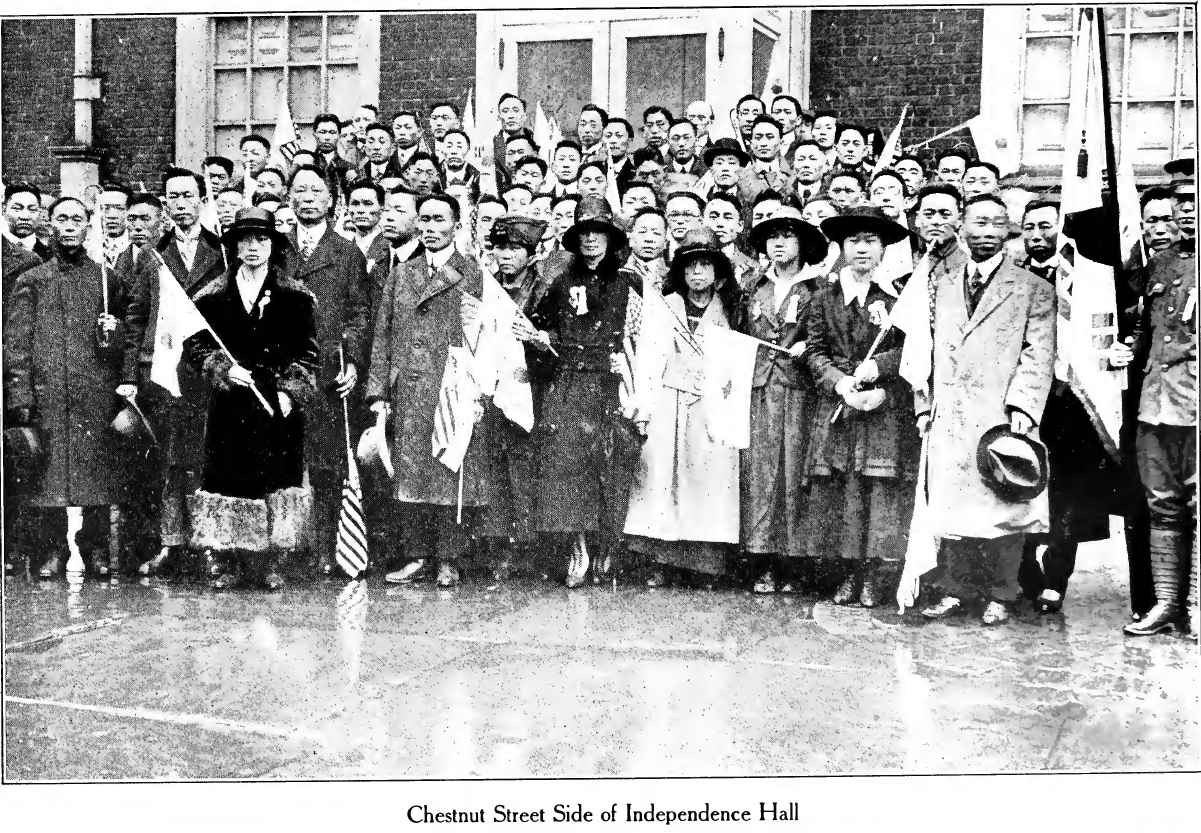
In front of Independence Hall (facing Chestnut Street)
