= Philip Jaisohn =

Korean American physician and politician (1864–1951)

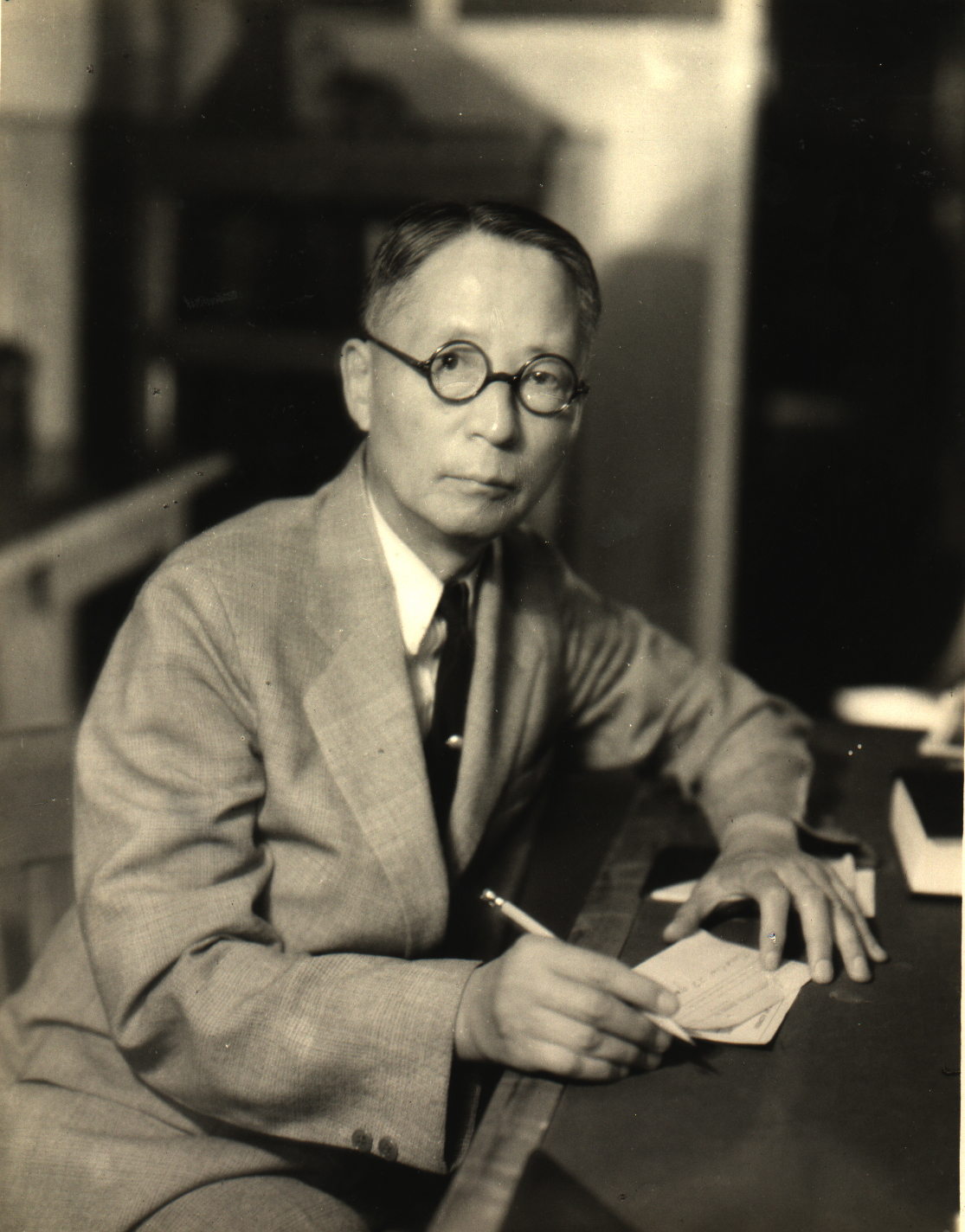
- Born: January 7, 1864; Boseong, Jeolla, Joseon
- Died: January 5, 1951 (aged 86); Norristown, Pennsylvania, United States
- Burial place: Seoul National Cemetery, South Korea
- Citizenship: Joseon (until 1890); United States (1890–1951)
- Political party: Independence Club
- Spouses: Lady Yi of the Gyeongju Yi clan; Lady Kim of the Gwangsan Kim clan; Muriel Armstrong
- Children: 1 daughter, 1 son; second marriage; 2 daughters; third marriage
- Parents: Seo Gwang-hyo (father); Lady Yi of the Seongju Yi clan (mother)
- Family: Daegu Seo clan

Korean name
- Hangul: 서재필
- Hanja: 徐載弼
- RR: Seo Jaepil
- MR: Sŏ Chaep'il

Art name
- Hangul: 송재, 쌍경
- Hanja: 松齋, 雙慶
- RR: Songjae, Ssanggyeong
- MR: Songjae, Ssanggyŏng

Courtesy name
- Hangul: 윤경
- Hanja: 允卿
- RR: Yungyeong
- MR: Yun'gyŏng

Seo Jae-pil (Korean: 서재필; Hanja: 徐載弼; January 7, 1864 – January 5, 1951), better known by his English name Philip Jaisohn, was a Korean American politician, physician, and Korean independence activist. He was the first Korean to become a naturalized citizen of the United States. He also founded the Tongnip sinmun, the first Korean newspaper written entirely in Hangul.

Jaisohn was one of the organizers of the failed Kapsin Coup in 1884. He was thus convicted for treason and sought refuge in the United States where he became a citizen and earned a medical doctorate. Upon returning to Korea in 1895, Jaisohn was offered a position as a chief advisor of the Joseon government. He declined, choosing to focus on reform movements where he advocated for democracy, Korean independence and self reliance from foreign intervention, numerous civil rights and universal suffrage. Jaisohn was forced to return to the United States in 1898, from where he participated in the First Korean Congress and advocated for the March First Movement and U.S. Government support for Korean independence. Jaisohn became a chief advisor to the United States Army Military Government in Korea after World War II and was elected as an interim representative in South Korea in the 1946 legislative election.

He died in 1951 shortly after returning to the United States during the Korean War. His remains were reinterred at the Seoul National Cemetery in 1994.

Jaisohn was an admirer of American-style liberalism and republicanism. He was also reform-minded, and sought to revise Confucianist culture and institutions in Korea.

== Biography ==
=== Early years ===
Jaisohn was born on January 7, 1864, in Boseong County, Jeolla Province, Joseon. He was born into the Daegu Seo clan. Jaisohn was the third son of Seo Gwang-hyo, who was a local magistrate, but was raised by his relatives in Seoul.

At a young age, Jaisohn was adopted by his father's second cousin, Seo Gwang-ha, and his wife. Jaisohn studied at Kim Seong-geun and Park Kyu-su's private school during his adolescence, where he was exposed to the reformist ideals of Kim Okkyun.

=== Political activist ===
Jaisohn passed the civil service exam at the age of 18, becoming one of the youngest people to ever pass this exam, and as a result became a junior officer in 1882. Thereafter he was appointed to Gyoseokwan Bujeongja (교서관 부정자; 校書館 副正字) and Seungmunwon Gajuseo (승문원 가주서; 承文院假主書). In 1883 he was appointed to Seungmunwon Bujeongja (승문원 부정자; 承文院 副正字) and Hunryunwon Bubongsa (훈련원 부봉사; 訓鍊院 副奉事). In the following year, he was sent to Japan where he studied both at the Keio Gijuku (the forerunner of the Keio University) and the Toyama Army Academy. In July 1884, his adoptive mother died, but he quickly returned to public service under special orders.

In his reports to the king, Jaisohn explained that Korea's armed forces were useless and obsolete in the new world. These reports annoyed powerful conservatives, but it made Jaisohn widely known and respected among like-minded young intellectuals. By that time, a small but growing number of young intellectuals believed that fundamental reform had to occur or Korea would fall victim to the neighboring imperialist powers of Qing China, Japan, or Russia. He was appointed to Joryeon-guk Sagwanjang (조련국 사관장; 操鍊局 士官長) shortly after.

In December 1884, Jaisohn, following Kim Okkyun, was involved in the Kapsin Coup, a radical attempt to overturn the old regime and establish equality among people. Jaisohn and Kim Okkyun, Pak Yŏnghyo, Yun Chi-ho, Hong Yeong-shik, and others had planned a coup for seven months, from July to December 1884. He was appointed the Vice-Minister of Defense. The coup was defeated in three days, as China intervened by sending military troops.

As a result, his older half-brother, Seo Jae-hyeong, and younger brother, Seo Jae-chang, were killed. His biological father, Seo Gwang-hyo, and biological mother, Lady Yi of the Seongju Yi clan, were executed under a guilt-by-association system. His second wife, Lady Kim of the Gwangsan Kim clan, was sold into slavery, but committed suicide. His 3-year-old son had also died in 1885. Convicted of treason, Soh Jaipil lost half of his family and had to flee Korea to save his life.

His only remaining family was his older brother, older sister, younger brother, and younger sister, along with his eldest daughter and her husband. However, his older brother soon committed suicide by poisoning on September 5, 1888.

The majority of the 1884 revolutionaries fled to Japan. Unlike them, Jaisohn moved to the United States. He saw Japan as essentially a conduit for Western knowledge and ideas, but preferred to deal with what he saw as the source itself.

=== Exile in the United States ===
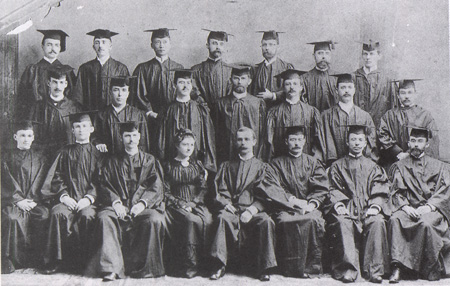
Graduation from Columbian Medical College (1892)

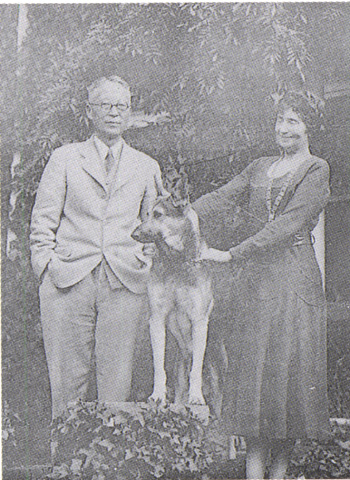
Philip Jaisohn and Muriel Armstrong, 1930s

In 1885, early in his stay in America, Jaisohn worked part-time jobs. In 1886, Jaisohn lived in Norristown, Pennsylvania, and attended the Harry Hillman Academy (Wilkes-Barre, PA) thanks to the help of John Welles Hollenback. He began to use the name "Philip Jaisohn" at that time. In 1890, he became the first Korean immigrant to acquire United States citizenship. He studied medicine at Columbia Medical College (now George Washington University School of Medicine & Health Sciences), and became the first Asian-American Doctor when he received his medical degree in 1892.

In 1894, he married Muriel Mary Armstrong, a distant relative of the former president of the United States, James Buchanan, and the eldest daughter of George B. Armstrong, credited as the founder of the U.S. Railway Mail Service. They had two daughters, Stephanie and Muriel.

=== Tongnip sinmun ===
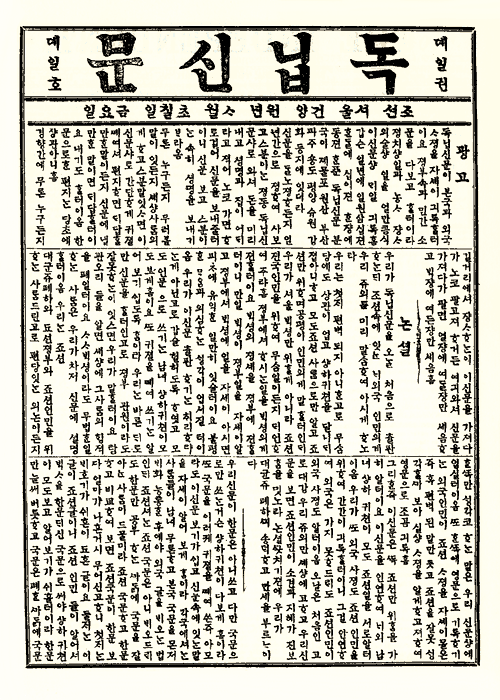
Tongnip sinmun

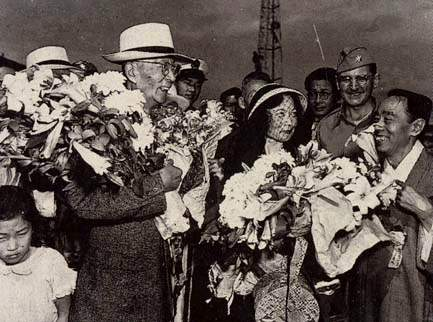
Jaisohn, his daughter Muriel, and Kim Kyu-sik in Incheon in 1947.

In 1894, Japan defeated China in the First Sino-Japanese War, which had occurred on the Korean Peninsula. The Korean cabinet was filled with reformists. Along with these political changes, the treason of the Kapsin Coup was pardoned, enabling Jaisohn's return in 1895. In December 1895, he went to Incheon. The Joseon government wanted to appoint him as the Foreign Secretary, but he refused to take the position. In Korea, he endeavored to politically educate people. Jaisohn published the Tongnip sinmun (also called The Independent) to transform the Korean population into an informed citizenry. He was the first to print his newspaper entirely in Hangul to extend readership to lower classes and women.

=== Sowing the ideals of independence and democracy ===
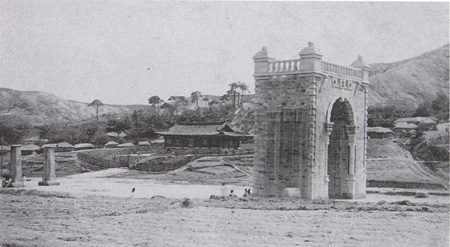
Independence Gate

In the 1896 to 1898 civil rights movement and suffrage movements, Jaisohn's goal was to ensure that Korea could drift away from the Chinese sphere of influence without falling too heavily under the influence of Russia or Japan. He was also behind the construction of the Independence Gate, which was initially meant to symbolize Korea's independence from foreign interventionism. Apart from his journalistic and political activities, he delivered regular lectures on modern politics and the principles of democracy.

He promoted national independence as the principal political ideal and emphasized neutral diplomatic approaches to protect Korea from China, Russia and Japan. He also underscored the importance of public education, modernized industry and public hygiene. The Independence was particularly critical of misconduct by government officials, which caused strong reactions by the conservatives. Under the aegis of the Independence Club (독립협회; 獨立協會), Jaisohn organized the All People's Congress, an open public forum to debate over political issues. The Congress was hailed by young reformers and began to establish nationwide chapters.

In November 1897, Jaisohn finished the construction of the Independence Gate (독립문;獨立門). At this time he also ended the policy of Yeongeunmun (영은문;迎恩門). Yeongeunmun was the Korean policy of welcoming the Qing Manchu envoys (Yeongeunmun roughly translates from Korean to English as "Welcome with kindness gate").

In 1898, conservatives accused Jaisohn and the Club of seeking to replace the monarchy with a republic, and the Korean government requested Jaisohn to return to the US. After his return, the Korean government ordered the club to disband and arrested 17 leaders, including Syngman Rhee.

=== Clerk and Company manage ===
In April to August 1898, he accompanied an army to the Spanish–American War. In 1899 he found employment as clerk for the Hospital of the University of Pennsylvania.

In 1904, worked with Harold Deemer, who was a year younger, to create the "Deemer and Jaisohn shop". It was a stationery and printing industry store. In 1915, the shop became called the Philip Jaisohn Company, and specialized in the printing industry.

=== Independence movements ===
In the United States, Jaisohn conducted medical research at the University of Pennsylvania and later became a successful printer in Philadelphia. When he heard the news of the March First Movement (1919), a nationwide protest against Japanese rule in Korea, Jaisohn convened the First Korean Congress, which was held in Philadelphia for three days on April 14 to 16, 1919. After the Congress, Jaisohn devoted his energies and private property to the freedom of Korea.

He organized the League of Friends of Korea in 21 cities with the help of Rev. Floyd W. Tomkins, rector of the Episcopal Church of the Holy Trinity, Philadelphia on Rittenhouse Square and established the "Korean Information Bureau." He published a political journal called Korea Review to inform the American public of the situation in Korea, and to persuade the U.S. government to support the freedom of Koreans.

In the 1920s, Jaisohn, who had just turned 60, returned to research and spent his 60s and 70s working as a specialist doctor and micro-biologist, as well as occasionally publishing in peer-review academic journals.

Five years later in 1924, Jaisohn went legally bankrupt due to his political engagement and had to resume practicing medicine to make a living. At age 62, he became a student again at the University of Pennsylvania to renew his medical knowledge. After this, he published five research articles in the medical journals specializing in pathology. During World War II, he volunteered as a physical examination officer with the belief that the victory of the U.S. would bring freedom to Korea.

=== Last days in Korea ===
Jaisohn returned to Korea once again after Japan's defeat in World War II. The U.S. Army Military Government in control of the southern part of Korea invited him to serve as chief adviser. In December 1946, he was elected to the Interim Legislative Assembly (남조선과도입법의원; 南朝鮮過渡立法議院). In May 1945, liberal and moderate socialist intellectuals selected him as candidate for presidency, but he declined. When the date of the first presidential election was confirmed by the United Nations, Jaisohn was petitioned to run for presidency by 3,000 people, including a young Kim Dae-jung, but he refused in the end.

Jaisohn felt that political unity was needed for a new nation, despite his uneasy relationship with the president elect Syngman Rhee. He decided to return to the United States in 1948. Suffering a heart attack a week earlier on December 29, Jaisohn died on January 5, 1951, during the Korean War, just two days before his 87th birthday.

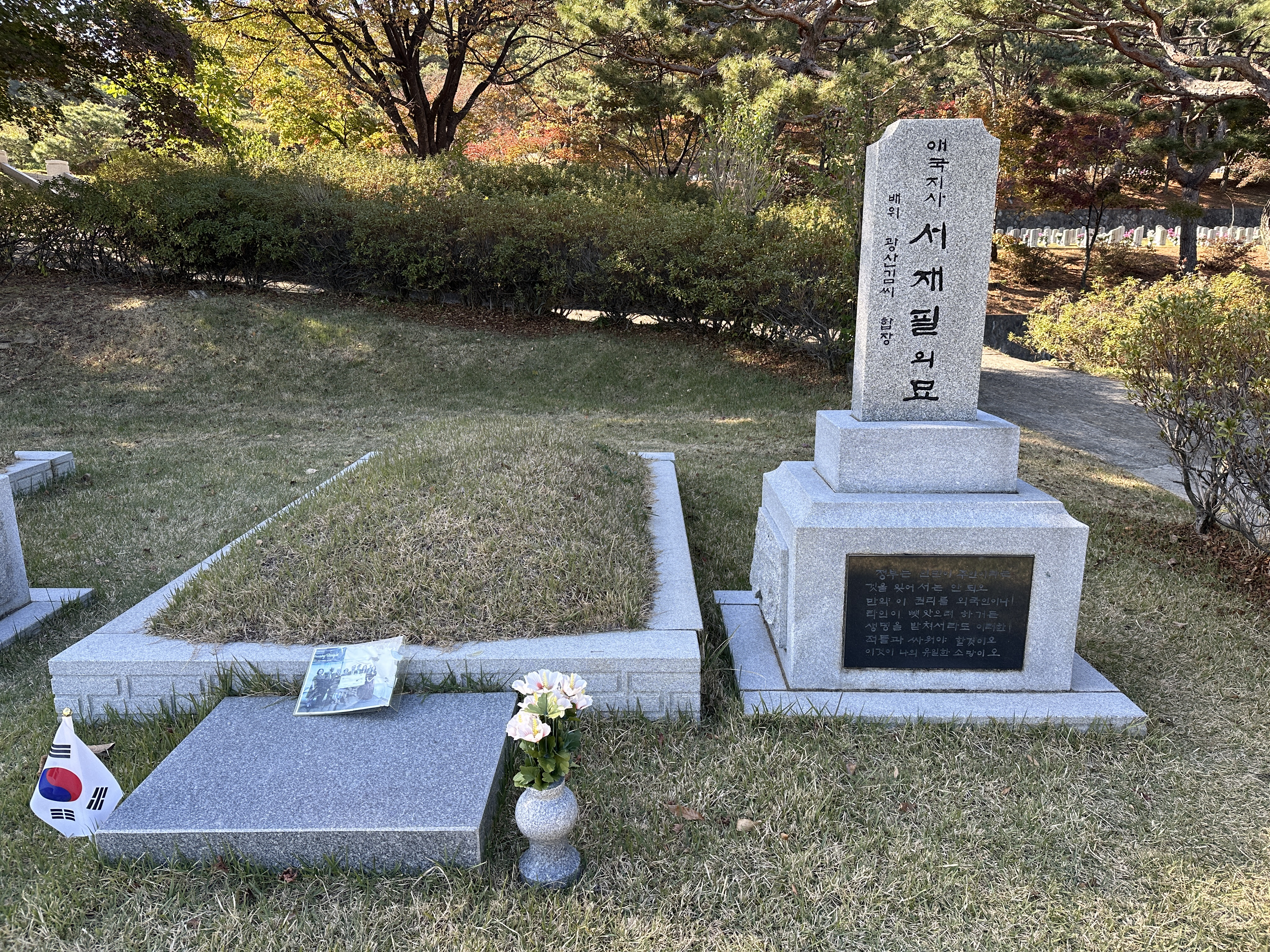
Jaisohn's grave in the Seoul National Cemetery (2023)

His body was cremated, and buried in Pennsylvania. In 1994 his remains were repatriated to South Korea. His ashes are buried in the Seoul National Cemetery.

== Family ==
- Father
  - Seo Gwang-hyo (서광효; 徐光孝; August 22, 1800 – December 19, 1884)
    - Adoptive father: Seo Gwang-ha (서광하; 1824–?)
- Mother
  - Yi Jo-yi (이조이; 李召史), Lady Yi of the Seongju Yi clan (성주 이씨; 星州李氏; 1830 – December 19, 1884)
    - Adoptive mother: Lady Kim of the Andong Kim clan (안동 김씨; 安東 金氏; 1828–?)
- Sibling(s)
  - Older half-brother: Seo Jae-hyeong (서재형; 徐載衡; 1851 – December 13, 1884)
  - Older sister: Lady Seo of the Daegu Seo clan (서씨; 1857–?)
  - Older brother: Seo Jae-chun (서재춘; 徐載春; March 4, 1859 – September 5, 1888)
  - Younger brother: Seo Jae-chang (서재창; 徐載昌; 1866 – December 13, 1884)
  - Younger brother: Seo Jae-woo (서재우; 徐載雨; September 5, 1868 – January 24, 1929)
  - Younger sister: Seo Gi-seok (서기석)
- Wives
  - Lady Yi of the Gyeongju Yi clan (경주 이씨; 慶州 李氏; 1860–1880)
  - Lady Kim of the Gwangsan Kim clan (광산 김씨; 光山 金氏; 1862 – January 12, 1885)
    - Unnamed daughter
    - Unnamed son (1883 – January 12, 1885)
  - Muriel Mary Armstrong (or Muriel Josephine Armstrong; 1871 – August 1944)
    - Father-in-law: George Buchanan Armstrong (May 18, 1852 – July 13, 1937)
    - Mother-in-law: Margaret Elizabeth Roben (June 27, 1852 – September 2, 1911)
      - Daughter: Stephanie Jaisohn Boyd (1896 – April 5, 1991)
        - Son-in-law: Waren Ross Hardican (April 1896 – May 2, 1958); divorced
          - Grandson: Philip Jaisohn Hardican (June 10, 1916 – June 14, 1993)
        - Son-in-law: Paul Cameron Boyd (December 7, 1899 – November 12, 1964)
          - Step-Grandson: Paul Cameron Boyd Jr. (May 16, 1920 – February 24, 1936)
          - Step-Grandson: Robert Martin Boyd (December 21, 1921 – June 24, 1992)
          - Step-Grandson: Rawie Carson Boyd (August 10, 1927 – April 2002)
          - Unnamed Grandson (1923)
      - Daughter: Muriel Jaisohn (1898 – June 16, 1987)

== Books ==
- Hansu's Journey
- My Days in Korea and Other Essays
- My Compatriots in the Homeland (고국에 계신 동포에게)

== Awarded ==
- Order of Merit for National Foundation, Republic of Korea Medal (1970)

== Timeline ==
=== 1864–1895 ===
- 1864 (January 7): Born in Bosung, Korea as the second son of Jaisohn Kwang-Hyo.
- 1871: Adopted to Jaisohn Kwang-Ha, Jaisohn Kwang-Hyo's second cousin.
- 1882: Passed the Civil Service Examination.
- 1883–1884: Attended the Toyama Army Academy in Japan.
- 1884 (December 4): Staged the Kapsin coup with Kim Okkyun. The attempt was aborted in three days and Jaisohn had to emigrate to Japan.
- 1885: Arrived in San Francisco with Park Young-hyo and Jaisohn Kwang Bum and worked at a furniture store.
- 1886–1889: Attended the Harry Hillman Academy (Wilkes Barre, PA). John W. Hollenback supported Jaisohn's living and tuition in entirety. Anglicized his name from 'Soh Jaipil' to 'Philip Jaisohn'.
- 1889: Worked at the Army Surgeon General's Library in Washington D.C translating Chinese and Japanese medical books into English. Entered the Medical School at Columbian University (now George Washington University).
- 1890 (January 19): Obtained American citizenship.
- 1892: Earned a medical degree and opened a private medical office in 1894.
- 1894 (June 20): Married Muriel Armstrong, daughter of George Buchanan Armstrong. Jaisohn later had two daughters (Stephanie and Muriel).
- 1895: Left Washington D.C. at the request of the Korean government.

=== 1896–1924 ===
- 1896 (April 7): Started to publish The Independent.
- 1896 (June 2): Founded the Independence Club.
- 1897 (May 23): Built the Independence Hall.
- 1897 (August 8): Began a public forum called 'All People's Congress'.
- 1897: Erected the Independence Gate.
- 1898: Proposed the constitution of Congress. Russia and Japan pressed the Korean government to dispel Jaisohn.
- 1899–1903: Worked at the Wistar Institute, University of Pennsylvania.
- 1904–1913: Operated a publishing and stationery business in Philadelphia with his friend, Harold Deemer.
- 1914–1924: Operated the Philip Jaisohn & Co. in Philadelphia.
- 1919 (April 14–16): Convened the First Korean Congress in Philadelphia after receiving the news of nationwide resistance in Korea.
- 1919 (April 22): Established the Korea Information Bureau.
- 1919 (May 16): Founded the League of Friends of Korea in Philadelphia with Rev. Floyd W. Tomkins. The League thereafter established 24 chapters in U.S., and one each in London and Paris.
- 1921 (September 29): Korean Provisional Government in Shanghai appointed Jaisohn as the vice-representative to the Washington Naval Conference.
- 1922–1935: Contributed a number of articles to Dong-A Ilbo, Chosun Ilbo, Shin Min, New Korea (Shin Han Min Bo), Peace & Liberty.
- 1924: Philip Jaisohn & Co. went bankrupt.

=== 1925–1951 ===
- 1925: With Yu Ilhan, Jaisohn founded the New-Ilhan & Co., but the business was not successful.
- 1925: Attended the Pan-Pacific Conference in Hawaii as a Korean delegate.
- 1925: Established residence in Media, Pennsylvania.
- 1926: Entered the Medical School of the University of Pennsylvania.
- 1927–1936: Worked at the Jeans Hospital, St. Joseph Hospital, Charleston General Hospital and Chester Hospital.
- 1929–1934: Published five research articles in pathology journals.
- 1936: Opened a private medical office in Chester, Pennsylvania.
- 1937–1940: Contributed various columns such as "My Days in Korea" and "Random Thoughts" to The New Korea.
- 1941: His wife, Muriel Armstrong died.
- 1942–1945: Volunteered as a physical examination officer for the US Army during World War II.
- 1945: Awarded a medal from the US Congress in honor of contribution to the US Army.
- 1947 (July 1): Returned to Korea as the Chief Advisor to the US Military Government and as a member of the Korean Interim Legislative Assembly. Jaisohn made strenuous efforts toward democracy and the unification of Korea.
- 1948: Petitioned to run for presidency.
- 1948 (September 11): Returned to the U.S.
- 1951 (January 5): Died at the Montgomery Hospital, PA during the Korean War (1950–1953).

=== After 1951 ===
- 1975 (January 15): The Jaisohn Memorial Foundation was established in Philadelphia, PA.
- 1977: The National Foundation Medal was awarded posthumously to Jaisohn by the Korean government. A memorial monument was erected at Rose Tree Park, Media, PA.
- 1994: His remains were exhumed from West Laurel Hill Cemetery in Philadelphia and moved to the National Cemetery in Seoul, Korea.
- 1994: The Philip Jaisohn Memorial House was added to the Pennsylvania Registry of Historic Places.

== Philip Jaisohn Memorial House ==
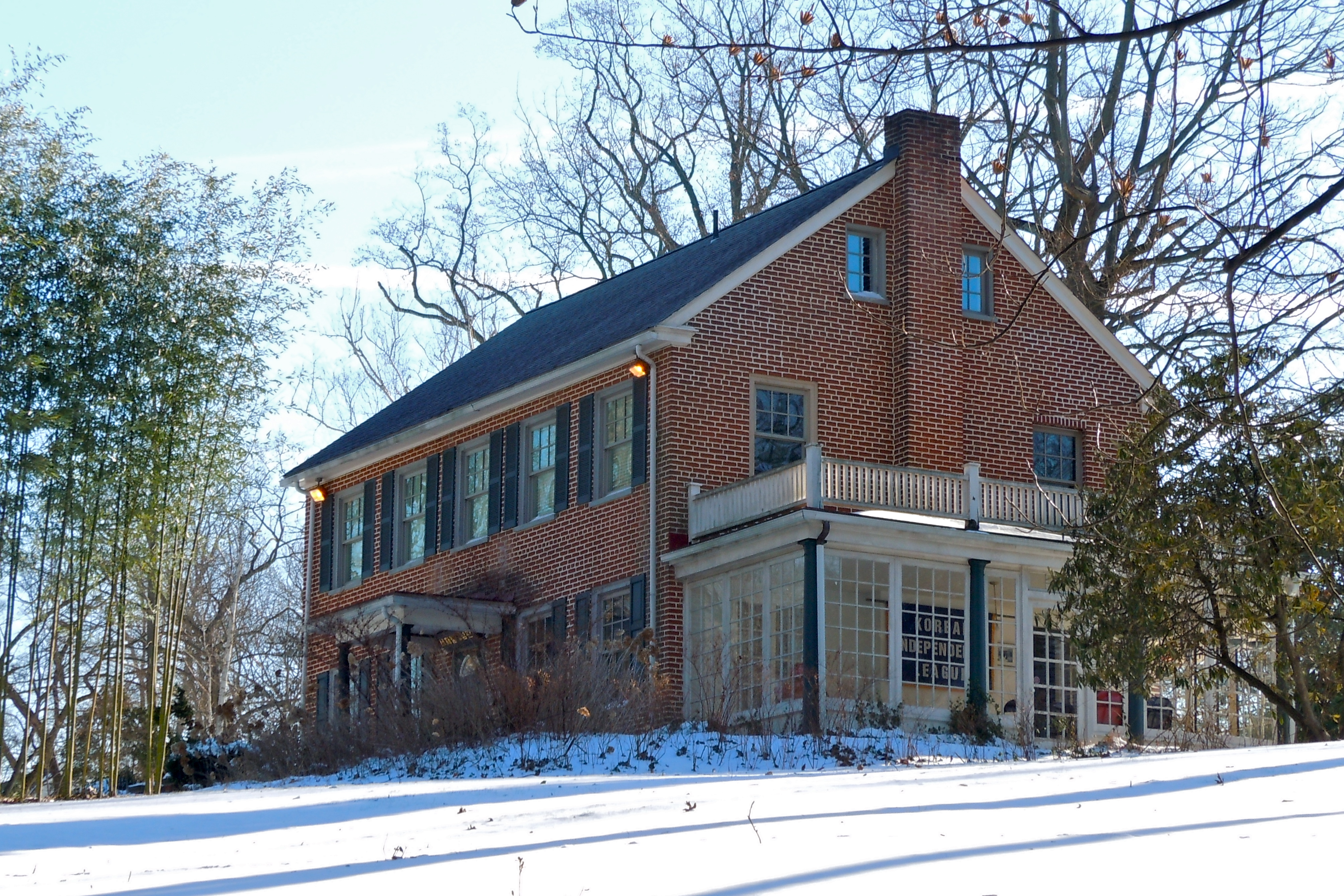
Philip Jaisohn Memorial House

The Philip Jaisohn Memorial House in Media, Pennsylvania was Jaisohn's home from 1925 to 1951. This house was bought when Jaisohn was in great financial difficulties, while his house in Philadelphia was pledged due to his devotion to the Korean independence. His Media home was acquired by the Philip Jaisohn Memorial Foundation in 1987 and opened to the public in 1990. Since then, the Jaisohn House has been visited by many students and politicians from Korea such as former South Korean president and Nobel peace laureate Kim Dae-jung as well as Korean American immigrants and community neighbors.

On May 21, 1994, the Pennsylvania Historical and Museum Commission and the Philip Jaisohn Memorial Foundation dedicated a historical marker for Jaisohn, stating:

American-educated medical doctor who sowed seeds of democracy in Korea, published its first modern newspaper (1896-98), and popularized its written language. The first Korean to earn a Western medical degree and become a U.S. citizen. He worked for Korean independence during the Japanese occupation, 1910-45. Chief Advisor to the U.S. Military Government in Korea, 1947-1948. This was his home for 25 years.
