= Jessamine S. Whitney =

American statistician and public health professional (1880–1941)

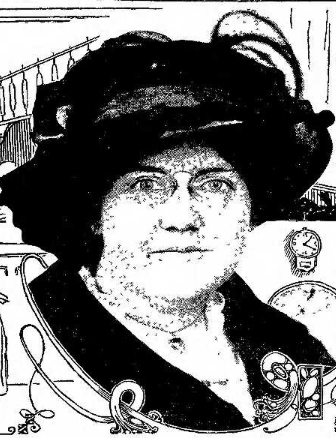
- Jessamine S. Whitney from a 1914 newspaper profile.
- Born: Jessamine Sophia Whitney; 1880; Norwich, New York, U.S.
- Died: March 11, 1941 (aged 60–61); New York City, New York, U.S.
- Occupations: statistician, public health expert
- Years active: 1904–1941
- Known for: Tuberculosis studies and publications

Jessamine Sophia Whitney (1880 – March 11, 1941) was an American statistician and public health professional, who worked at the National Tuberculosis Association for 22 years.

== Early life and education ==
Whitney was born in Norwich, New York, in 1880, the daughter of Dr. W. W. Whitney. She attended Binghamton Central High School in the class of 1897, and Oneonta Normal School. She studied mathematics and economics and earned a bachelor's degree in 1905 from Cornell University, with further studies in actuarial science at New York University. She was active in the New York College Women's Suffrage Association, and served as president of the New York and Washington chapters of the Cornell Women's Club.

== Career ==
Whitney taught English in Puerto Rico as a young woman; during that time, in 1904, she was described as "the first woman to drive an automobile in Porto Rico": "she very quickly mastered it, finally taking complete charge and guiding the vehicle the greater part of the distance" from Ponce to San Juan. She returned to Puerto Rico in 1931 for the National Tuberculosis Association.

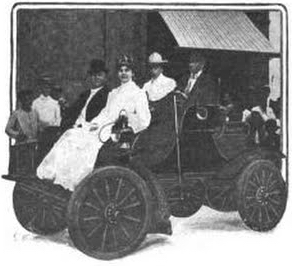
Jessamine S. Whitney in an automobile in Puerto Rico, from a 1904 publication.

Whitney worked at the United States Census Bureau in 1909, compiling tables of data on infant mortality, and then for the U. S. Bureau of Labor, studying child labor in cotton mills; she was also a statistician at the United States Shipping Board. In 1913 and 1914, she made a survey of conditions for tuberculosis in Georgia, under the auspices of the Raoul Foundation.

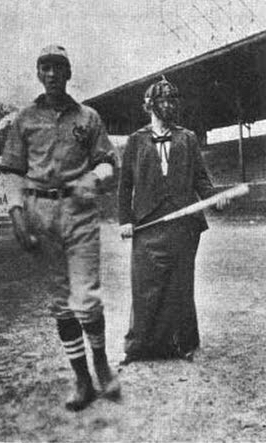
Jessamine S. Whitney as an umpire in a 1914 charity baseball game (the player in the foreground is Pat Witherbee).

Whitney began working at the National Tuberculosis Association in 1918, as "research secretary", a title eventually changed to "chief statistician". She wrote pamphlets and articles for the Association, including "The Costs of Tuberculosis" (1921, with Louis Israel Dublin), "The Rural Health Demonstration" (1924), "Facts and Figures about Tuberculosis" (1931), "Official Report of Childhood Type of Tuberculosis" (1934), "Tuberculosis among Nurses" (1935), and "The Need for Statistics on Rehabilitation" (1937). She worked with Alba M. Edwards of the Bureau of the Census on occupational health research, and standardizing occupational categories for mortality studies. She documented "tuberculosis migration," showing how Easterners with tuberculosis moving to the American Southwest for the supposed health benefits of a drier climate was creating a strain on resources in Arizona, New Mexico, Texas, Colorado, and California.

In 1929 and 1938, Whitney represented the United States at the meeting of the International Conference on the Classification of Causes of Death; she was the only woman delegate from any country to attend in 1929, and one of only three women delegates at the 1938 meeting. In 1935 she was described as the "ranking woman vital statistician of this country, and probably of the world."

== Baseball ==
Whitney was a self-described baseball fan from childhood. She compiled statistics on players and teams, and predicted winners based on her own calculations. In 1914, she was recruited to be an umpire at a charity baseball game at the National Conference of Charities and Correction meeting in Memphis.

== Personal life ==
Whitney died after suffering a heart attack at her desk in 1941, aged 61 years, in New York. Her gravesite was at Vestal Cemetery in Endicott, New York.
