= Louis Israel Dublin =

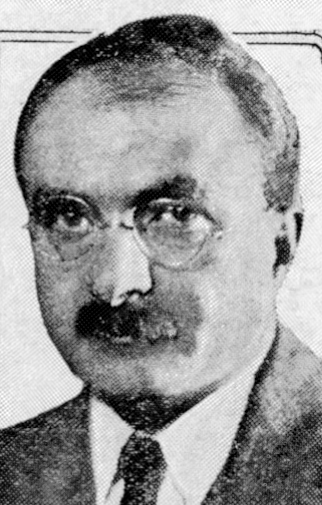
- Born: November 1, 1882; Kaunas, Russian Empire
- Died: March 7, 1969 (aged 86); Winter Park, Florida, US
- Education: City College of New York; Columbia University
- Occupation: Statistician
- Spouse: Augusta Salik (m. 1908)

Louis Israel Dublin (November 1, 1882 – March 7, 1969) was a Jewish American statistician. As vice president and statistician of the Metropolitan Life Insurance Company, he promoted progressive and socially useful insurance underwriting policies. As a scholar, Dublin was an important figure in the establishment of demography as a social-scientific discipline in the United States during the 1920s and 1930s. Dublin was interested in eugenics but as a Jew of recent immigrant extraction criticized eugenicists for equating biological superiority with Nordic origins.

== Biography ==
Dublin was born in Kovno, Russian Empire. He came to the U.S. in 1886 with his parents Max and Sarah (Rosensweig). Dublin obtained his bachelor's in 1901 at City College of New York. He earned his Ph.D. at Columbia University in 1904. He married Augusta Salik on April 5, 1908. Dublin taught at Yale as a lecturer in vital statistics. In 1924 served as president of the American Statistical Association.

He died in Winter Park, Orange County, Florida at the age of 86.

== Body Mass Index ==
While serving as a vice president at Met Life Insurance and as a statistician Dublin developed a height for weight table based on longevity of life insurance holders in the early 1940s. These tables would later develop into the Body Mass Index developed by University of Minnesota's cholesterol and heart disease physiology researcher Ancel Keys in 1972. Keys intended the BMI to be used only for the study of groups and not to be applied to individuals. The index is statistically very limited in usefulness as covered a very limited demographic of people who were able to afford life insurance and who were mostly white.

== Major works ==
- Louis Israel Dublin, Alfred J. Lotka: The Money Value of a Man (Public Health in America Series). New York : Arno Press, 1977 (Repr. of the 1930 ed. by the Ronald Press Co., New York). ISBN 978-0-405-09814-7
- with Lee K. Frankel and Miles M. Dawson, Workingmen's Insurance in Europe, 1910
- with Lee K. Frankel, Principles of Life Insurance, 1911
- Mortality Statistics of Insured Wage Earners and Their Families, 1919
- Louis I. Dublin, To Be or Not to Be: a Study of Suicide, 1933. Harrison Smith and Robert Hass, New York.
- Louis I. Dublin, A Family of Thirty Million: The Story of the Metropolitan Life Insurance Company, 1943.
- Louis I. Dublin, The Facts of Life: From Birth to Death, New York: The Macmillan Company, 1951.
- A 40 Year Campaign Against Tuberculosis, 1952
- Louis I. Dublin, Suicide: a Sociological and Statistical Study, 1963. Ronald Press Company, New York.

== Other works ==
- Louis I. Dublin, After Eighty Years (autobiography) University of Florida Press, Gainesville 1966, p. 243
- Louis I. Dublin, "Home-Making and Careers," Atlantic Monthly, 138: 335–43, September 1926.
- Louis I. Dublin and Jessamine S. Whitney (April 1921). "The Costs of Tuberculosis" American Review of Tuberculosis 5:178-184.
- Collected papers at the Archives, National Library of Medicine, Bethesda, Maryland
