= Floyd W. Tomkins =

American Episcopal priest (1850–1932)

Floyd Williams Tomkins Jr. (New York, February 7, 1850 – Philadelphia, March 24, 1932) was an American Episcopal Priest, and Rector of the Church of the Holy Trinity, Philadelphia in Rittenhouse Square for 33 years from 1899 to his sudden death in 1932. He supported the independence of Korea from Japan.

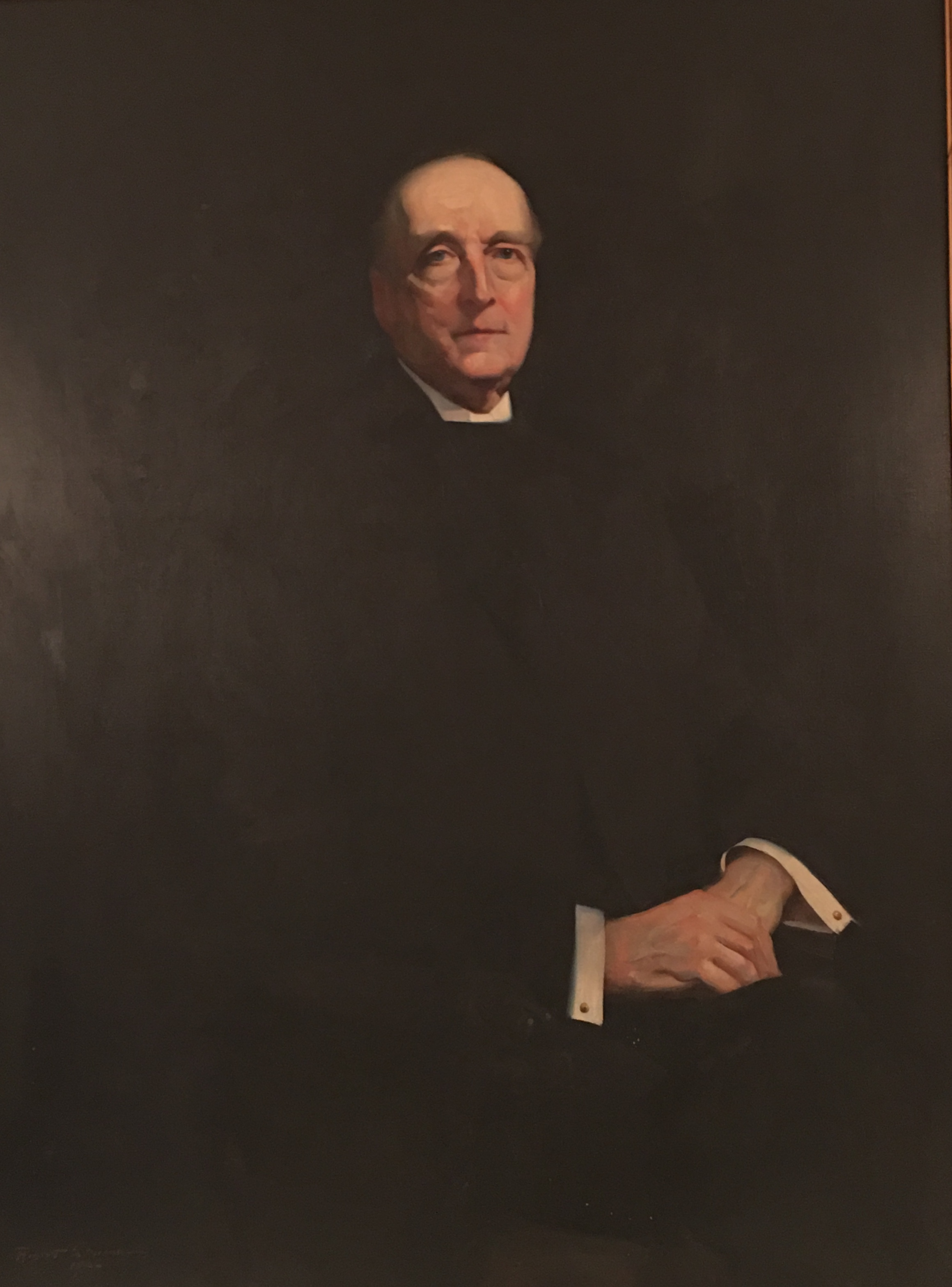
Rev. Floyd W. Tomkins in 1922, portrait in the Church of the Holy Trinity, Philadelphia, by Robert S. Susan (Vilnius 1887-Philadelphia 1957)

== Biography ==
Tomkins was born in New York City, February 7, 1850 from Floyd W. Tomkins (1815-1898), owner of newspapers in New York in 1870, son of Captain James Tomkins (1785-1859). Captain Tomkins's father Charles was a merchant born in London in 1747 and married in New York in 1782.

He graduated at Harvard in 1872 with the degree of Bachelor of Arts, and from the General Theological Seminary in 1875 with the degree of Bachelor of Divinity.

Ordained the same year to the Diaconate by Bishop Horatio Potter in Old Trinity Church, New York, Tomkins went to Colorado as a missionary, where in 1876 he was ordained priest by Bishop John Franklin Spalding. Until 1833 he served as a missionary in Pueblo, Col., Cheyenne, Wyo., Kenosha, Wis. and Minneapolis, Minn. From 1883 he occupied charges in New Hampshire, New York city, Hartford, Conn., Chicago, Ill., and Providence, R.I.

On March 5, 1899 he became Rector of the Church of the Holy Trinity, Philadelphia. In the Diocese of Pennsylvania he was active in religious work and movements for civic betterment. He was elected as a Deputy to the General Convention of 1913 and he served a Deputy to all General Conventions until the Denver Convention in 1931. Tomkins was frequently requested as a preacher and preached in every Diocese and Missionary District of the Church. He wrote a number of papers on religious subjects and devotional books.

Following Tomkins' death, the New York Times reported briefly on a memorial service held in his honor, noting that "representatives of virtually every Protestant communion in the city paid tribute today to his life." Rev. Schaeffer, President of the General Synod of the Reformed Church in the United States, referred to him as a "great pulpit orator and ready writer with a strong personality, large heart and liberal hands," adding that Tompkins "was a fearless champion of righteousness and a stanch defender of the faith.”

The Mayor of Philadelphia J. Hampton Moore said: “He was one of the outstanding clergymen of the city and country. Probably no voice upholding the standard of morality and religion was more familiar than his. A community can ill afford to lose men of such high ideals and sterling worth.”

His funeral officiated by Bishop Francis M. Taitt on March 28, 1932 was attended by hundreds of people, many of which were unable to gain admittance in the church.

He married Ann Maria Grant Cutter in 1875 and had one son, Rev Floyd W. Tomkins Sr. (1887-1979), founder of the ecumenical movement, and three daughters, Dr. Ann Maria Cutter Gibson, founder of Singing Eagle Lodge camp, Sarah Graham Tomkins and Dr. Mary Jeannette Keney Tomkins.

== The League of Friends of Korea ==
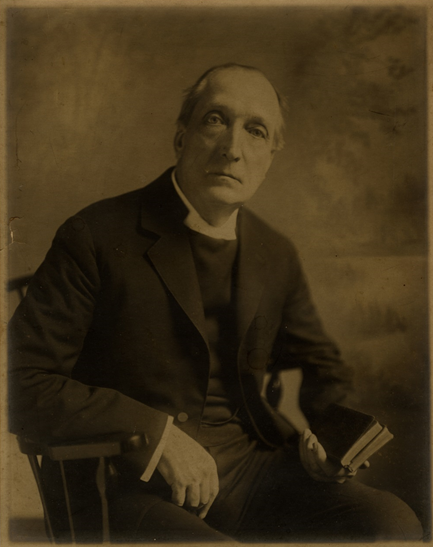
Rev. Floyd W. Tomkins around 1920

Reverend Floyd W. Tomkins helped Philip Jaisohn found the first branch of The League of Friends of Korea in Philadelphia at the First Korean Congress in April 1919. He was the President of the Philadelphia League and opened the First Korean Congress on April 14–16, 1919 in Philadelphia with a prayer and a speech. The board of governors of the Philadelphia branch of the League of Friends of Korea included influential Methodist and Presbyterian ministers as well as several notable businessmen. The League of Friends of Korea was an organization designed to inform the citizens of the United States of Korea’s struggle for independence and to use the influence of the United States to help Koreans gain religious freedom. At the initial meeting, a resolution was presented by Dr. Reverend M. Blackburn and was seconded by Dr. Warren F. Teel that concluded with the declaration of their “profound sympathy with the Korean people in their struggle for freedom” and pledged to the Korean people their “full moral support”.

The League developed more branches throughout the United States including branches in Washington D.C., New York City, and Chicago. These branches held mass meetings in which they would aid in the development of new branches and spread information through various series of lectures on the situation in Korea. Mass meetings often led to participants sending resolutions to Congress asking for action from the U.S. government to show sympathy for the Korean people.

Additionally, Reverend Floyd W. Tomkins was awarded the Korean National Medal in 2019.

== Bibliography ==
- Floyd W. Tomkins, Beacons on life's voyage; brief answers to personal problems, Philadelphia, G.W. Jacobs & Co., 1903, reprinted by Forgotten Books
- Floyd W. Tomkins, Following Christ, Philadelphia, G. W. Jacobs & co., 1901, reprinted by Forgotten Books
- Floyd W. Tomkins, Prayers for the quiet hour, Boston and Chicago, United society of Christian endeavor, c1910, reprinted by Forgotten Books
- Floyd W. Tomkins, contrib.: Russell H. Conwell, Founder of the Institutional Church in America: The Work and the Man, by Agnes Rush Burr
- Floyd W. Tomkins, Prohibition, The Annals of the American Academy of Political and Social Science, September 1, 1923
- Floyd W. Tomkins, The Christian Life, What It Is, and How to Live It, 1896, reprinted by Forgotten Books
- Floyd W. Tomkins, The Faith and Life of a Christian, reprinted by Forgotten Books
- Bishop Officiates the Burial Service of Rev. Dr. Floyd W. Tomkins at Church of the Holy Trinity, Rittenhouse Square (1932) , Church News, April 1932
- Floyd W. Tomkins, First Korean Congress: Philadelphia, 1919, reprinted in 2018 by Forgotten Books

== Honours ==
- Korean National Medal, 2019

== Quotes ==
"Let the resurrection joy lift us from loneliness and weakness and despair to strength and beauty and happiness"
