= Korea Review (1919) =

1919–1922 American monthly journal

Korea Review (Korean: 한국평론) was a monthly journal published in Philadelphia, Pennsylvania. It was founded by Philip Jaisohn (Soh Jaipil) in 1919 and published by the Korean Students League of America alongside the Korean Information Bureau. The journal was printed in English to inform Americans about the Korean independence movement. As Philip Jaisohn and Homer Hulbert were friends, it is likely that Jaisohn titled his 1919 publication as an homage to Hulbert.

Korea Review ceased publication in 1922, just a few years after its formation. However, its campaign to win support for Korean independence succeeded in strengthening organizations like the League of Friends of Korea and in bringing Japanese aggression to the attention of American politicians.

== Political background ==
Koreans wanted the support of the American public because many believed that their government failed to honor an agreement with Korea. In 1882, the United States signed the Shufeldt Treaty, which established a friendly relationship with Korea and promised support in the event of an attack. When Japan annexed Korea in 1910, some Korean politicians petitioned the U.S. government, arguing that they were obligated to help under the treaty signed just decades prior. Despite multiple attempts, the American government did not intervene on behalf of Korea, and the Japanese had control of the nation until their surrender to the Allied forces of WWII in 1945.

== History ==
The first issue of Korea Review was printed in March 1919, but founder Philip Jaisohn had been planning the journal since 1918. He had long been seeking to reform Korea—in 1884, he participated in the Gapsin Coup, which sought to eliminate social distinctions and legal privileges for the upper classes. After its failure he fled to America, where he earned a medical doctorate and met his wife Muriel Armstrong.

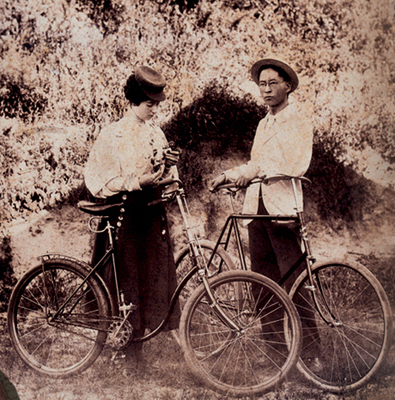
Philip Jaisohn and Muriel Armstrong in Korea, 1895

He returned to Korea in 1895, again hoping to change the consciousness of the people, this time by spearheading various peaceful reform movements, sharing Wilsonian ideals, and advocating for Korean self-determination. In 1898, he moved back to the United States, where he began to focus on American support for Korean independence.

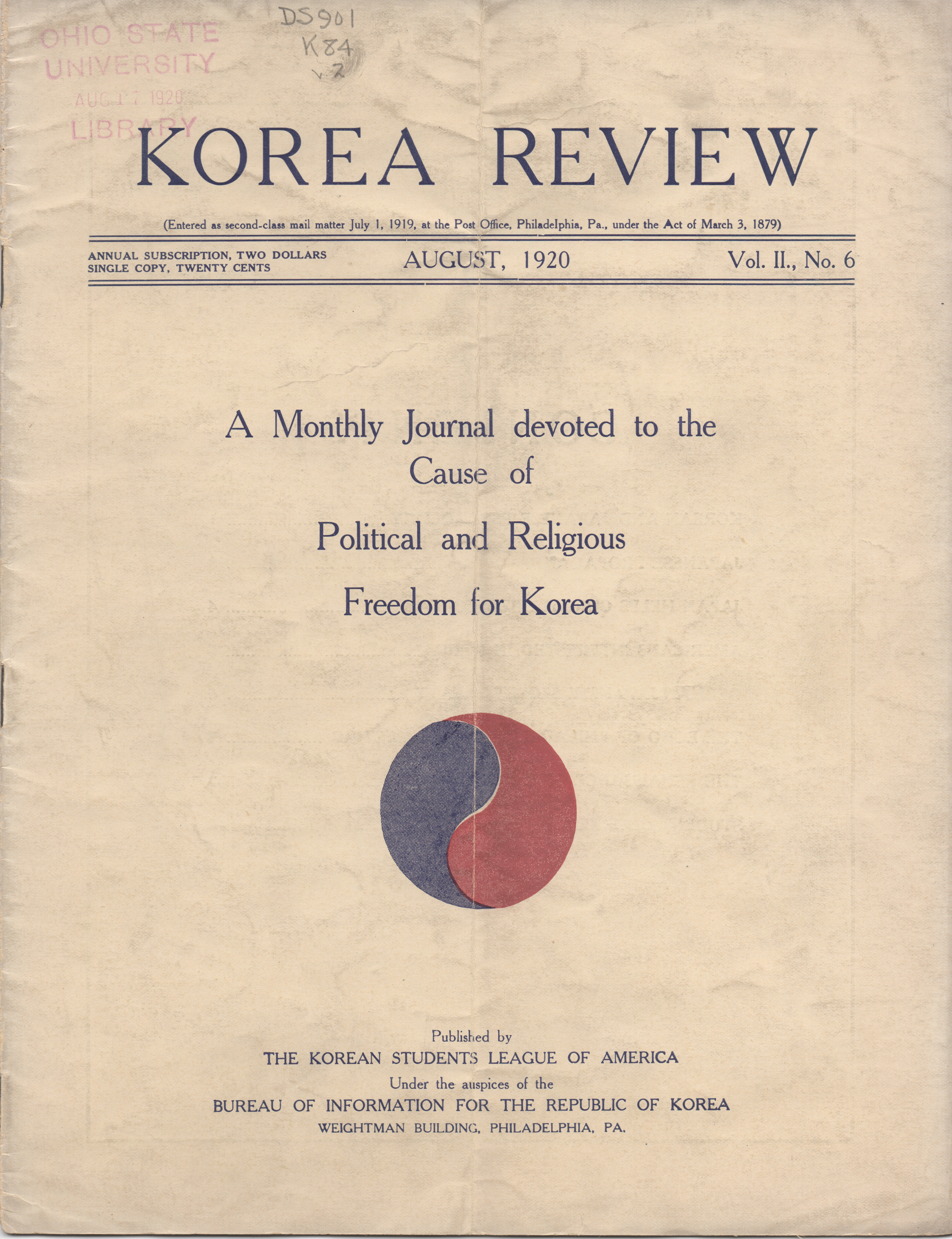
Korea Review 1920 cover

On March 1, 1919, a nation-wide nonviolent protest occurred in Korea. During this event, now known as the March 1st Movement or Sam-il Movement, a declaration of independence was read in Seoul, and people gathered at over 1,000 other sites to object to Japanese colonization. In support of this movement, Jaisohn organized the First Korean Congress, a three-day event in Philadelphia attended by Koreans and Americans. The Congress petitioned President Wilson and "released a number of tracts that outlined the Korean message to the world" including appeals to Christianity and a desire for global peace. Jaisohn also helped start the League of Friends of Korea, which eventually grew to over 10,000 members in 21 cities including the United Kingdom.

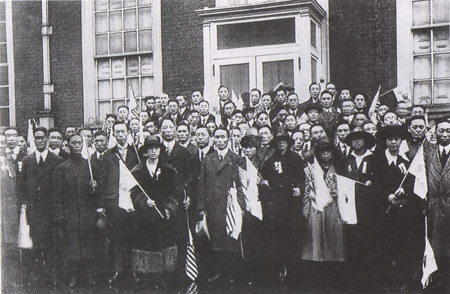
Members of the First Korean Congress; Philadelphia, 1919

== Content ==
The motto of Korea Review was "truth enlightens the world" and the journal focused on encouraging Americans to support Korean independence. Philip Jaison believed that Korea "had been misrepresented in America by the very clever Japanese press bureau, composed of highly educated men and backed by the government." To gain the trust of the American public, Korea Review focused on three areas: the brutality of the Japanese colonial government, Japan's political ambitions and global politics, and the suppression of Korean Christianity.

Syngman Rhee, the first president of the Korean Provisional Government, was featured frequently in Korea Review. His writing often addressed Japan's illegal occupation and insinuated that the nation would seek more territory on the Asian continent, which could destabilize Japanese-American relations.

Students were also a prominent part of Korea Review. Issues printed in 1919 and 1920 had a "Students' Corner" section in the back where Korean students shared their achievements related to the cause of Korean independence or offered their thoughts on Korea's relationship with Japan. The removal of this section of the paper coincided with the removal of the Korean Students League of America as publishers and the shift to a greater focus on economic concerns.
