= Jewish Chautauqua Society =

The Jewish Chautauqua Society was the interfaith education program of the Men of Reform Judaism (MRJ), a U.S. nonprofit organization, whose independent existence ceased in 2015 when it was merged into the Union for Reform Judaism. It had defined its mission as seeking "the dissemination of knowledge of the Jewish religion by fostering the study of its history and literature, giving popular courses of instruction, issuing publications, establishing reading-circles, holding general assemblies, and by such other means as may from time to time be found necessary and proper."

== History ==
The Jewish Chautauqua Society was conceived and founded in 1893 by its chancellor, Henry Berkowitz of Philadelphia, and modeled on the mother Chautauqua of New York. In 1897 the first assembly was held in Atlantic City, and this focusing of the work has so greatly prospered that the original session of two weeks was extended to three. The creation of departments for study and entertainment were similar to those of other Chautauquas. More than this, the influence of the society resulted in the London Jewish Study Society.

== Publications and structure ==
The official organ of the Society, Menorah Magazine, was published in New York City; Assembly Record, as well as a special series of various publications, were published in Philadelphia. The Society was incorporated in 1899, and was administered by the following officers: a chancellor, a president, a treasurer, a secretary and director, a field secretary, a board of trustees, and an educational council.
