= Henry Berkowitz =

American rabbi (1857–1924)

- Born: March 18, 1857; Pittsburgh, Pennsylvania
- Died: February 7, 1924 (aged 66); Atlantic City, New Jersey

Henry Berkowitz (March 18, 1857 – February 7, 1924) was a Reform rabbi, educator and author.

== Early life and education ==
Henry Berkowitz was born in Pittsburgh in 1857, the son of Louis and Henrietta (Jaroslawski) Berkowitz, both born and married in Prussia and immigrated to United States in 1847 on the ship Corvo from Hamburg.

After graduation from the Central High School of Pittsburgh in 1872 he attended Cornell University because he wanted to be a lawyer. Berkowitz decided to become a Reform rabbi because he heard a sermon by Isaac Mayer Wise and enrolled at the new Hebrew Union College-Jewish Institute of Religion founded by him, where he graduated in 1883 in the first class. He also graduated at the University of Cincinnati in the same year. In 1887 he received the D.D. degree from the Hebrew Union College.

== Career ==
Berkowitz served from 1883 to 1888 at Congregation Sha'arai Shomayim (Mobile, Alabama). In 1888 he moved to Congregation B'nai Jehudah' in Kansas City, Missouri. In 1892 he was called by the Congregation Rodeph Shalom (Philadelphia). In this city he helped in the establishment of the Federation of Jewish Philanthropies (1901) and the Philadelphia Rabbinical Association (1901).

In 1919, he was invited to speak at the First Korean Congress in Philadelphia, where he gave a prayer and a talk associating the fight for Korean independence from Japanese occupation with the freedom of the Jews from Egypt. In his speech, he compared the Egyptian Jews to independence activists for both courage of being rebellious to the totalitarians and confirms the strength of that sympathy bond.

He was rabbi at Temple Rodeph Sholem until 1922 when he fell ill. According to Encyclopaedia Judaica, he was a chaplain and also a tour-guide at army bases. This had led to heart condition and forced retirement in his later life.

Rabbi Berkowitz played a part in the creation of numerous humanitarian organizations. In Mobile, Alabama he created The Humane Movement for the Protection of Children and Animals from Cruelty. In Kansas City, he helped create the first bureau of charities and corrections and participated in the meetings of the National Conference of Charities and Correction as a representative of the state of Missouri. In Philadelphia, he was a member of the Mayor's Vice Commission which dealt with the prostitution among East European immigrant girls and of the Board of Recreation, and was a vice-president of the Universal Peace Union and Social Purity Alliance. He also helped create playgrounds in all the city.

Berkowitz founded the Jewish Chautauqua Society in 1893, where he served as chancellor, which was his key contribution to developing American Jewish institutions and educations.

When the Central Conference of American Rabbis (CCAR) was founded in 1889 and he became a charter member. According to the same biographical sketch, he drafted a formula on meditating congregations and rabbis while he worked at CCAR as a committee chairman.

Berkowitz published many works, with all his manuscripts are conserved at the Jacob Rader Marcus Center of the American Jewish Archives in Cincinnati, OH.

== Beliefs ==
Berkowitz was against Zionism. He opposed those who insisted that contemporary Judaism demanded creation of a national Jewish state in Palestine. At the Central Conference of American Rabbis (CCAR) convention in Cincinnati in 1899, well before the establishment of the modern State of Israel, he listed three reasons for his opposition: (1) he remained hopeful that the world would accept Jews; (2) he believed Zionism was more sentimental rather than practical; (3) he claimed Zionism would make Jews shift focus from religion to the race and nationality of being part of a Jewish state. Berkowitz’s sentiments in this statement reflected a pre-Holocaust worldview.

A petition signed in 1919 by Berkowitz and other US Jewish leaders was published in The New York Times, with the title "Protest to Wilson against Zionist State: Representative Jews Ask Him to Present it to the Peace Conferences." The petition was sent the same year to the Paris Peace Conference, 1919.

== Family ==
Berkowitz married Flora Brunn of Coshocton, Ohio in 1883 with whom he had two children: Etta J. Reefer and Max E. Berkowitz.

== Death ==
Berkowitz died in Atlantic City in 1924.

== Bibliography ==
- Henry Berkowitz, Joseph Krauskopf, Bible Ethics, 1883
- Henry Berkowitz, Joseph Krauskopf, The Union Hebrew Reader, Bloch (Cincinnati, OH), 1884
- Henry Berkowitz, Judaism on the Social Question, J. B. Alden (New York, NY), 1887
- Henry Berkowitz, Why I am not a Zionist, Central Conference of American Rabbis Yearbook, 9, 167-173, 1899.
- Henry Berkowitz, The Symbol of Lights, 1893
- Henry Berkowitz, The Open Bible, 1896
- Henry Berkowitz, Kiddush; or Sabbath Sentiment in the Home, illustrated by Katherine M. Cohen, Philadelphia, 1898
- Henry Berkowitz, The Pulpit Message, Philadelphia, c. 1905
- Henry Berkowitz, Religion and the Social Evil, c. 1910
- Henry Berkowitz, The New Education in Religion, with a Curriculum of Jewish Studies, two volumes, Jewish Chautauqua Society, Philadelphia, 1913
- Henry Berkowitz, Quenching the Fires of Hate, 1919
- Henry Berkowitz et al., A Statement to the Peace Conference, presented March 4, 1919
- Henry Berkowitz, Prayer and speech at the First Korean Congress, Philadelphia, 1919, page 62-63
- Henry Berkowitz, Intimate Glimpses of the Rabbi's Career, Hebrew Union College Press, Cincinnati OH, 1921
- Max Berkowitz, The Beloved Rabbi: An Account of the Life and Works of Henry Berkowitz, New York: The Macmillan Company, 1932.
- Donald Fishman, Reform Judaism and the Anti-Zionist Persuasive Campaign, 1897-1915, Communication Quarterly, Fall 1998 v46 i4 p375
