= Miles Menander Dawson =

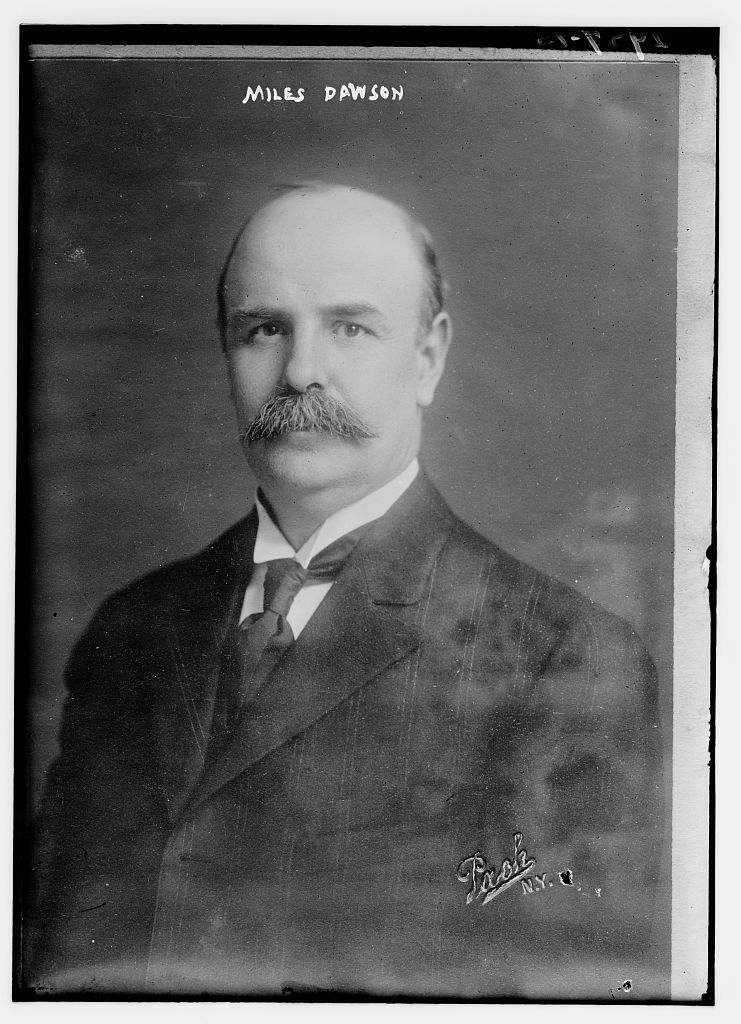

Miles Menander Dawson (May 13, 1863 – 1942) was an American author of poetry and philosophy, and ethics. He wrote books about the teachings of Zoroaster, Socrates, and Confucius. He was a member of the Confucian Society of China.

== Biography ==
He was born in Viroqua, Wisconsin on May 13, 1863. Dawson worked as an actuary in New York City. He wrote numerous books and articles on life insurance and actuarial science. In 1905 and 1910 he acted as a lobbyist when bills were being prepared to regulate the insurance industry. In 1908 he was an Invited Speaker of the ICM in Rome. In 1914 he became one of the inaugural Fellows of the American Statistical Association.

He died in 1942.

== Publications ==
- The Business Of Life Insurance (1905)
- The Basic Thoughts Of Confucius: the Conduct of Life (New York: Garden City Pub. Co., 1939)
