= Church of the Holy Trinity, Philadelphia =

Historic church in Pennsylvania, United States

- Church of the Holy Trinity
- U.S. National Register of Historic Places
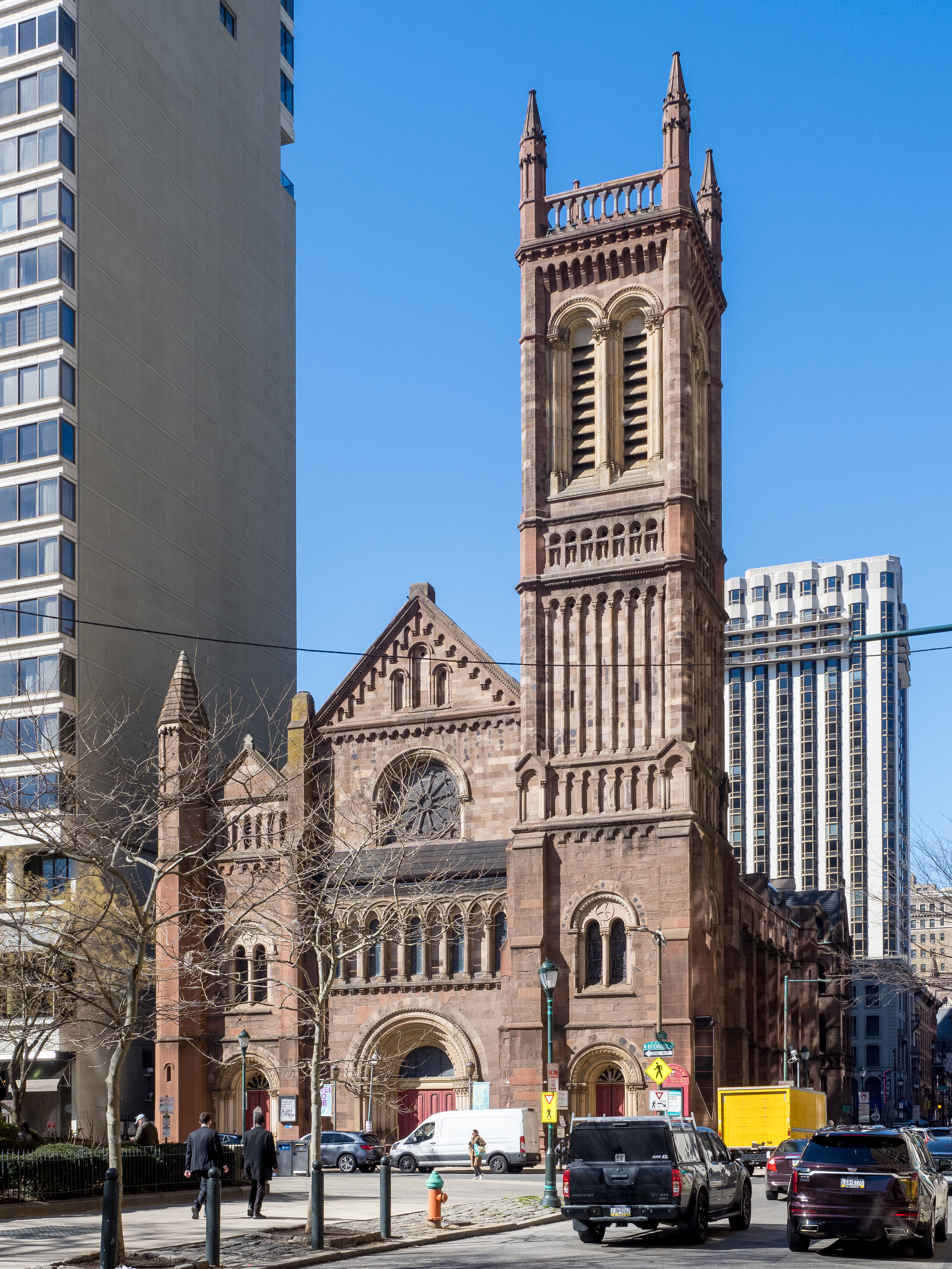
- (2024)

- Location within Philadelphia Location within Pennsylvania Location within the United States
- Location: 19th and Walnut Sts. facing Rittenhouse Sq., Philadelphia, Pennsylvania
- Coordinates: 39.9503°N 75.1730°W
- Built: 1857
- Architect: John Notman; George Hewitt
- Architectural style: Romanesque
- NRHP reference No.: 73001660
- Added to NRHP: February 6, 1973

Church of the Holy Trinity is an Episcopal church on Rittenhouse Square in Philadelphia. The first service in the church building, designed by Scottish architect John Notman, was held on March 27, 1859. The corner tower was added in 1867 and was designed by George W. Hewitt of the firm of Fraser, Furness & Hewitt. It is designed in the simpler "low church" style, rather than the fancier "high church" or Anglo-Catholic style of Notman's nearby St. Mark's Episcopal Church.

The church reported 471 members in 202 and 359 members in 2025. Plate and pledge income reported for the congregation in 2025 was $308,431. Average Sunday attendance (ASA) in was 163 persons in 2015 and 83 persons in 2025.

The church's rector from 1862 to 1869 was Phillips Brooks, who was also the author of the lyrics to the familiar Christmas carol "O Little Town of Bethlehem". Renowned (and sometimes reviled) for his ebullient homilies and his staunch opposition to slavery, Brooks delivered a eulogy to Abraham Lincoln in the church on April 23, 1865, following the U.S. President's assassination on April 14. This sermon was reprinted and widely read. After the end of the American Civil War, Brooks took a sabbatical from the church to travel to Europe, Israel and Palestine. His visit to Bethlehem inspired him to write a poem for his Sunday School students, and for the church's 1868 Christmas season he had church organist Louis Redner set the poem to music. The result was “O Little Town of Bethlehem."

In 1869, Brooks became rector of Trinity Church, Boston, where he oversaw the design, decoration and construction of Trinity's new Back Bay, Boston facility from 1872 to 1877 following the original church's destruction in Boston's Great Fire of 1872.

The church's rector from 1899 until his death in 1932 was the Rev. Floyd W. Tomkins.

Philadelphia's Church of the Holy Trinity is also known for its numerous stained-glass windows, including five by Louis Comfort Tiffany and one by Luc-Olivier Merson.

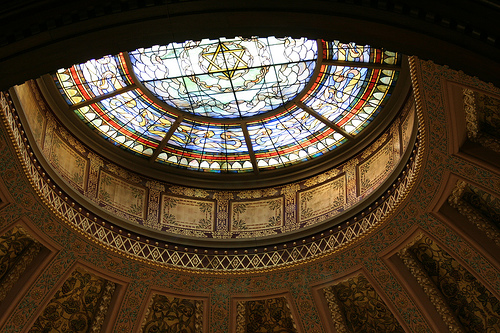
Skylight over the communion table

The church was listed on the National Register of Historic Places in 1973.

== Leadership ==
=== Vestry ===
The current vestry is composed of 12 members of the congregation.

=== Rectors ===
- Alexander Hamilton Vinton (1858-1861)
- Phillips Brooks (1862-1869)
- Thomas Augustus Jaggar (1870-1875)
- William Neilson McVickar (1876-1898)
- Floyd Williams Tomkins (1899-1932)
- Howard Robert Weir (1933-1937)
- Edgar Frank Salmon (1938-1951)
- Harry S. Longley (1951-1961)
- Cuthbert Pratt (1961-1979)
- Norman S. Kerr (1980-1983)
- John Arthur Smart (-1996)
- Terence Chaus Roper (1999-)
- Alan James Robert Neale (2004-2015)
- John Gardner and Rachel Wenner Gardner (co-rectors)

== See also ==
- The John Bohlen Lectureship
