= Plinths of Yeongeunmun Gate, Seoul =

Ruins in Seoul, South Korea

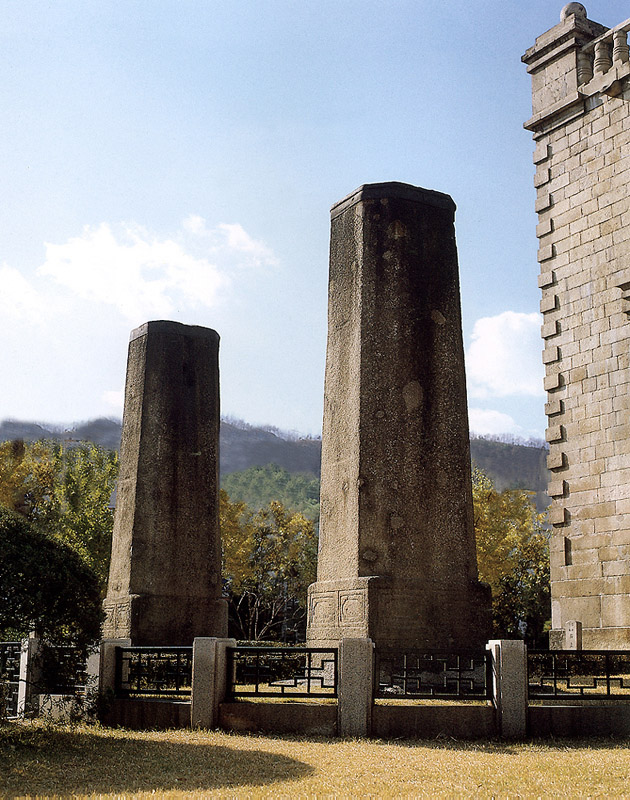
- The plinths viewed from the east
- Interactive map of Plinths of Yeongeunmun Gate, Seoul
- Type: Remnants of destroyed structure
- Location: 945 Hyeonjeo-dong, Seodaemun-gu, Seoul
- Coordinates: 37.5723037°N 126.9596220°E
- Area: 1,111 m^{2}
- Built: 1407
- Governing body: Seodaemun-gu
- Owner: Government of South Korea

Historic Sites of South Korea
- Official name: Plinths of Yeongeunmun Gate, Seoul
- Designated: 1963-01-21
- Reference no.: 33

Korean name
- Hangul: 서울 영은문 주초
- Hanja: 서울迎恩門柱礎
- RR: Seoul Yeongeunmun jucho
- MR: Sŏul Yŏngŭnmun chuch'o

The Plinths of Yeongeunmun Gate, Seoul (Korean: 서울 영은문 주초) are one of the Historic Sites of South Korea, as remnants of the Yeongeunmun destroyed in the year 1895. They are currently located in Seodaemun-gu, Seoul, inside of the Seodaemun Independence Park. This structure resulted from the intentional destruction of the Yeongeunmun, which was led by enlightenment activists in the Joseon government, promising diplomatic independence of the Joseon from the Late Chinese Empire.

== History ==
Yeongeunmun was a symbolic gate built in 1537 and gained its name in year 1539, in honor of the diplomatic hospitality of Joseon to Chinese diplomats. The Joseon Dynasty kept a diplomatic policy called Sadae (flunkeyism) until the late 19th century, which meant the Joseon would treat China with respect, as a much bigger country than Joseon. Yet during the Gabo Reform, which were a series of reformation movements driven by elites group called the Gaehwa Party to achieve modernization in the Joseon government, the Government led by the cabinet of Kim Hong-jip finally abandoned the Sadae policy and pursued an intention to demonstrate it to its people and other foreign powers. Eventually in February of 1895, Prime Minister Park Yung-hyo officially proposed the destruction of the Yeongeunmun to show there was no more Sadae towards China, and it gained support from Kim Hong-jip and Bak Jeongyang inside the cabinet. By this proposal, the Yeongeunmun was intentionally destroyed and its plinths were left as a memorial.

== Relation to Dongnimmun Arch ==
On April 17, 1895, Joseon had materialized its full diplomatic independence from the Qing dynasty by the conclusion of Treaty of Shimonoseki between the Empire of Japan and the Qing dynasty which was result of the First Sino-Japanese War. The Joseon government led by the Gaehwa Party desired to commemorate the abandonment of Sadae and emphasize the status of Joseon as a fully independent state. This desire was realized by Korean-American political activist Doctor Soh Jaipil. He suggested building a new symbolic gate styled as a Triumphal arch, at the site looking down on the remnants of the Yeongeunmun, to symbolize the independent state of Joseon around the world. The name of the newly proposed gate was to be Dongnimmun (Independence Gate). The construction of the Dongnimmun started in November of 1896 and finished around 1898. In this context, Dongnimmun and the Plinths of Yeongeunmun Gate, were both designated as Historic Sites of South Korea in same day in January of 1963, as a set together embodying Joseon's independent status.

== Relocation ==
In 1970s, the Government of Seoul was to modernize the roads around Dongnimmun and the Plinths of Yeongeunmun Gate. Though such road construction could harm two important historic sites, there were no alternatives to detour the project due to limited budget and other geographic issues. Experts of cultural heritage preservation were to draw out a feasible plan to relocate both Dongnimmun and the Plinths of Yeongeunmun Gate just 50 to 70 meters to the north of their then current location, towards the Seodaemun Prison. It is noteworthy that experts wanted to preserve the scenical structure where the Dongnimmun is looking down onto the Plinths of Yeongeunmun Gate, which was Soh Jaipil's intention as symbol of Joseon's independence, towering over the remnants of Sadae. The relocation process began on July 26, 1979, and finished on March 11, 1980. The area surrounding Dongnimmun, the Plinths of Yeongeunmun Gate and the Seodaemun Prison were restructured into a park to preserve the landscape of both historic sites. The park is currently named Seodaemun Independence Park.

== Gallery ==
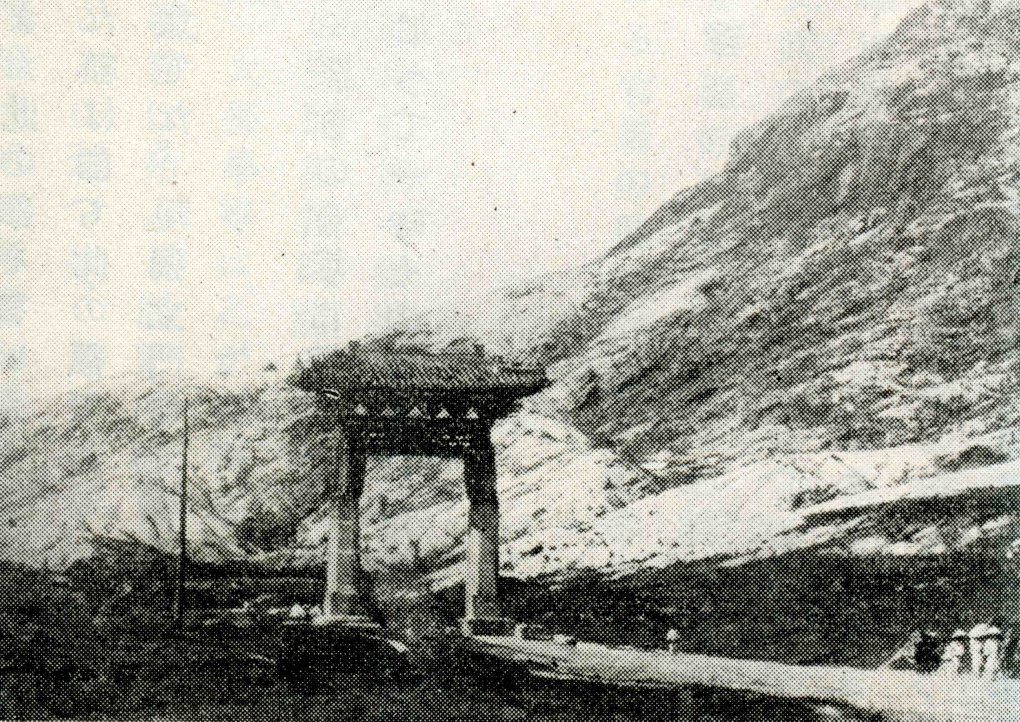
View of Yeongeunmun in front of Inwangsan before destruction

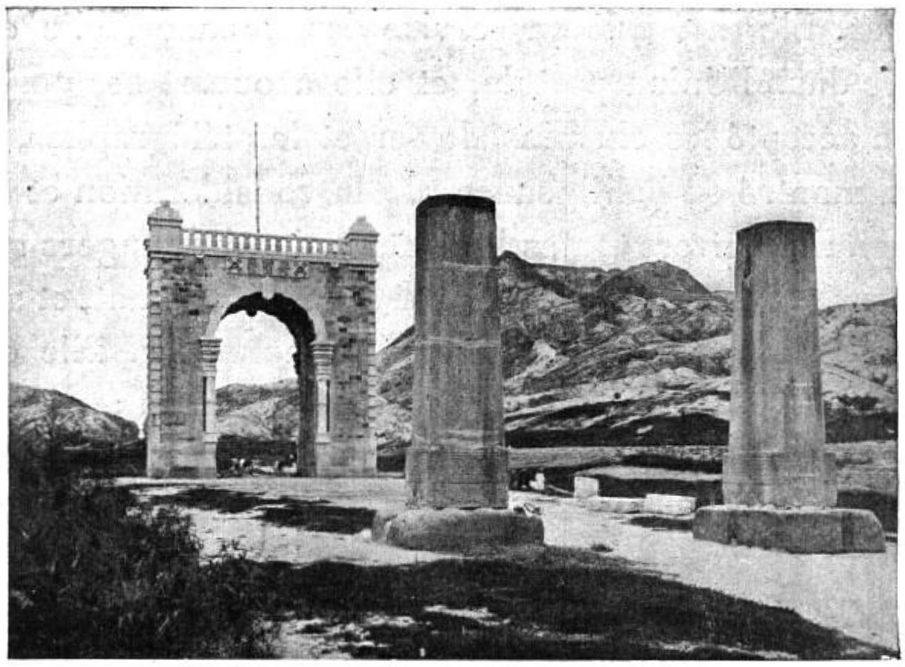
Scene of Dongnimmun looking down the Plinths of Yeongeunmun Gate

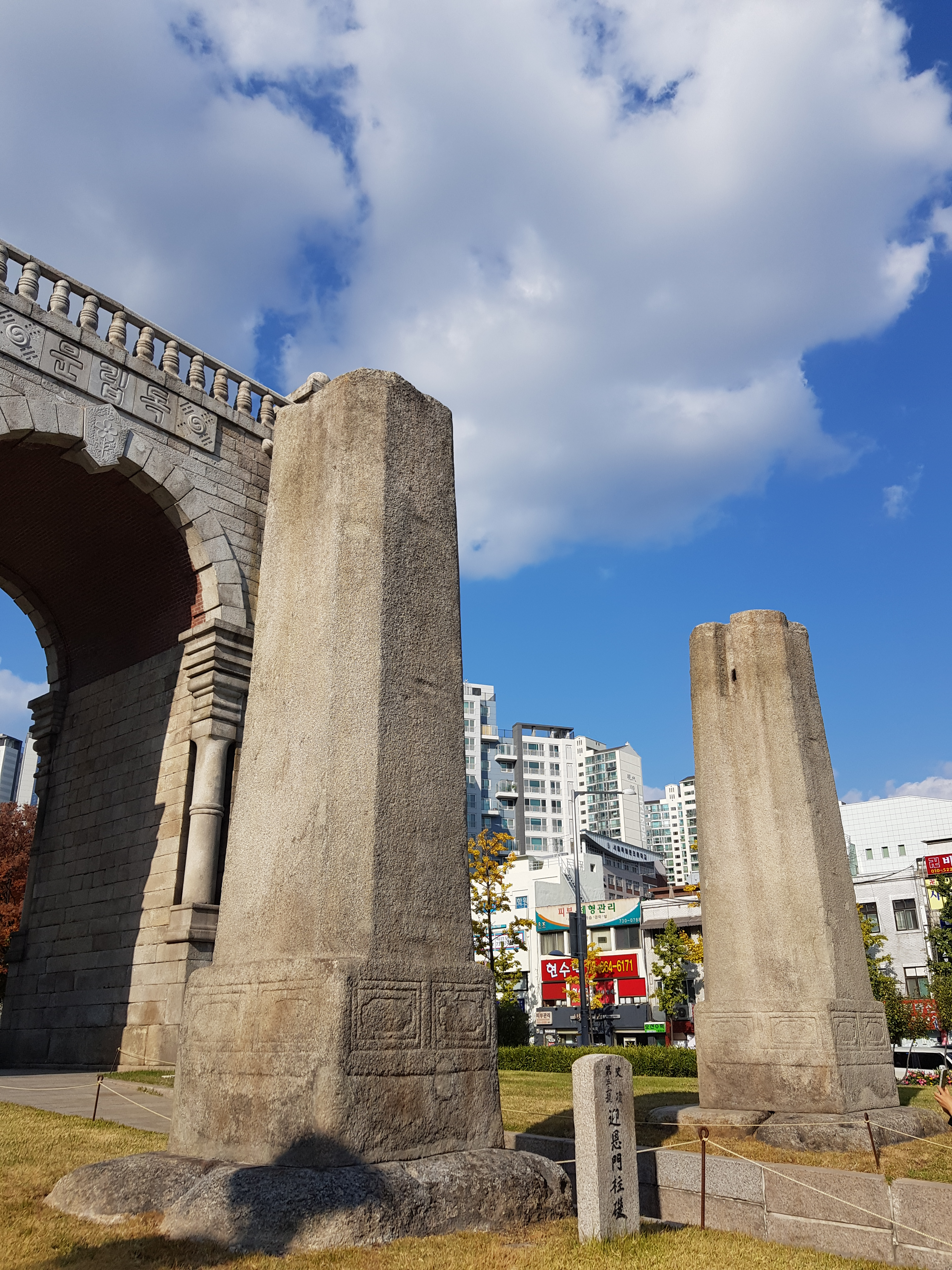
Relocated Dongnimmun and Plinths of Yeongeunmun Gate in Seodaemun Independence Park

== See also ==
- Independence Gate
- Seodaemun Independence Park
- Sadae
- Gabo Reform
- Gaehwa Party
