= Treasure Hunting =

Comic series by Kang Gyung-Hyo

Treasure Hunting (Korean: 보물찾기; RR: Bomulchatgi) is a South Korean Manhwa series by Kang Gyung-Hyo. The series has sold more than 13 million copies worldwide.

The series introduces South Korean readers to different countries around the world, their history, geography, and culture, through the eponymous treasure hunt for a lost, hidden, or stolen artifact that is culturally or historically significant to the particular country.

It mentions historical ties between South Korea and the country being visited. In translations for different countries, this introduction is changed accordingly for its target demographic.

== Premise ==
The primary character of the series is the young but precocious Pangi who accompanies his uncle, the Professor Gu-Bon, on various foreign trips for historical studies. They encounter a clue to a lost item, and the hunt would take them across the country, bringing them to sights and experiences significant to said country.

Pang-Yi's rival is Do To-ri, a child prodigy, though they are willing to work together occasionally.

== Characters ==
List of Treasure Hunting characters

=== Main characters ===
Name	Korean Name	Birthday	Description
Ji Pang-yi	지팡이	10 October	The main protagonist of the main series. An observant teenager who is knowledgeable in history. He is Gu-bon's nephew.
Do To-ri	도토리	3 May	The main protagonist of the main series after Ji Pang-yi. Pang-Yi's rival, but is actually caring about Pang-yi. His IQ is 180. but he has no luck with girls, untalented in mathematics, and suffers from acrophobia. His mentor is also his father, Dr. Dotoran.
Professor Ji Gu-bon	지구본	15 November	A famous archaeologist who was often invited overseas for assistance, portrayed as a fat gourmand with a brilliant mind. He is Pang-yi's uncle and mentor.
Lee Eun-ju	이은주	15 October	Research Assistant to Professor Gu-Bon, holds a crush on Dr. Pal-yi and Mark, despite both of them being the antagonists.
Dr. Do To-ran	도토란	20 November	The academic rival to Professor Gu-Bon, and father of Do To-ri and Do Re-mi. While Prof. Gu-Bon was mainly based in Korea, Dr. To-ran worked extensively for long periods overseas and appeared more cosmopolitan. His IQ is slightly higher than his son, To-ri.
Do Re-mi	도레미	3 May	Do To-ri's younger sister, who is less intelligent than her brother but friendlier towards Pang-yi. She is interested in art.

=== Antagonists ===
Name	Korean Name	Birthday	Description
Dr. Bong Pal-yi	봉팔이	15 October	One of the main antagonists of the main series, and the protagonist in the prequel series. In the main series, he use his handsome looks to lead women into stealing treasures.
Bong Ja-ba	봉자바	7 March	One of the main antagonists of the main series. She is Pal-yi's cousin, and is good at martial arts. Despite this, she was arrested and/or defeated multiple times.
Mark Youngman	마크 영맨	9 September	One of main antagonists of the main series. He is a member of the Treasure Masters. Like Pal-yi, he is a handsome man and made Eun-ju fall in love with him. Unlike the other antagonists in this series, he always escapes from Interpol and is never arrested. His real nationality is unknown. However, his loyalty to Sir M is great.
Sir M	M경	25 April	The head of a criminal organization headed Treasure Master that specializes in stealing valuable relics, and will stop at nothing to get the treasure. He is handsome and quite good at fighting. Being a notorious treasure hunter who values treasure more than human life, and would shoot people and beat them to death. He knew Pal-yi when he was young.
Wanda Kim	완다 김	1 November	Pal-yi's mother, who supports her son in his effort to steal treasures.
Ko & Kai	쟝과 얀센	5 May (Ko) 1 January (Kai)	Dr. Bong Pal-Yi's henchmen. Ko is fat but Kai is thin. They met Dr. Pal-yi since they were children.
CheChe Bros. (Coffee k),(Attila)	체체 형제 (커피 K),(아틸라)	30 August (Coffee K) 29 December (Attila)	They are brothers who are treasure hunters, and being the main villains following in the footsteps of Bong Pal-yi and Mark Youngman.

=== Supporting characters ===
Name	Korean Name	Birthday	Description
Kim Bok-nam/Takuya/James	김복남/후쿠오/푸난	15 September	First appears in Treasure Hunting in Japan. He is a Japanese-Korean boy who does not like his own name. He has 3 names. James (English), Takuya (Japanese), Kim Bok-nam (Korean).
Nuri	누리	30 May	First appears in Treasure Hunting in Turkey. He likes Do To-ri (who he was initially mistaken as a girl), but later likes Reyna, a girl in Israel. He is Muslim.
Professor William	윌리엄	25 March	An old English man. He is Professor Ji Gu-bon and Doctor Do To-ran's teacher.
Catherine	카트린느	20 January	First appears in Treasure Hunting in France. She is a rich girl who acts like a spoiled brat, and she likes Pang-yi, and later To-ri. Her name is as same as Catherine of Medici.
Duke Enrée	기즈 공		The High Duke of France and Catherine's father.
The Butler Louis	집사	19 November	Lady Catherine's personal butler. He is an old man who really cares of his young master.
Bart	도우리	25 November	First appears in Treasure Hunting in Canada as a Korean boy. He is Do To-ri and Do Re-mi's cousin. He is the best friend of Billy because they are hockey players.
Indy	인디아나 존즈	18 August	First appears in Treasure Hunting in America, then Treasure Hunting in Germany and Treasure Hunting in Italy. He is also a treasure hunter (but not associated with Sir M's organization). He likes adventure and hunting treasures from all around the world. He always has equipments with him, but he doesn't like to take a bath.

=== World Adventure History ===
Name	Korean Name	Country	Birthday	Description
Han Son-gi	한송이	Iraq	5 October	Pang-yi's friend. She is a member of UNESCO.
Wang Meiling	메이링	China	3 May	Chinese fighter.
Bandi	반디	India	23 October	A boy that looks like a girl because he never cut his hair, which causes Pang-yi to have a crush on him initially. His religion is Sikh.
Mrs. Misra		India		A beautiful Indian woman. She is Tandoori's mother. Professor Ji Gu-bon has a crush on her.
Mr. Hudson	하산	Egypt		An Egyptian oil millionaire. He wants Pang-yi and Do To-ri's team to help him hunting treasure in pyramid that he discovered. Yi Eun-ju has a crush on him.
Hawk	빛나는 나뭇가지	America	29 April	Native American fighter. He is working part-time job as a tour guide at the Statue of Liberty.
Two Tailed Skank	두 마리의 스컹크	America		No one know what his actual name is, but people call him Two Tailed Skank because his fart can separate into two lanes.
Akari	아카리	Japan		A ninja kid and the bodyguard for Kyonohana.
Kyonohana	쿄노하나	Japan		A geisha based in Kyoto. Her name means "the flower of the city". She keeps one fraction of Japanese sword.
Professor Kochu	모범상 교수	Japan	10 September	A good old friend of Professor Ji Gu-bon. He is clumsy and lives in a small house full of books and documents.
Hera	헤라	Greece	20 December	Her name is as same as the Greek goddess. She lives in Crete island. She likes Greek mythology. Both Pangyi and Dotori like her.
Nicos		Greece		Hera's father. He makes a fake treasure for Dr. Bong Pal-yi and regretted it.
Anne	안나	Germany		An innocent sweet girl. She likes German history and playing piano.
Emir	미하일	Germany		Anne's twin brother. He likes playing football.
Jens		Germany		He runs away from his father because his father is a Nazi. He has his own house. He is Anne and Emir's father.
Karl		Germany		Jens's father, Anne and Emir's grandpa. He used to be a Nazi SS officer. Currently, he is an old man that lives in a hospital in Munich. He is the only Nazi left that knows about the gold treasures.
Aborigine chieftain	어보리진 족장	Australia		When he learns that the sacred boomerang was taken away by being deceived by the acting of an indigenous youth who had been given it by Bong-pal yi, he faints from shock, but soon regains his strength and asks To-ri and the others for help.
Cupora	쿠커버러	Australia		She announces an important clue that a suspicious person was discovered on the night the ancestor's spirit appeared and teaches To-ri how to use a boomerang.
Maria	마리아 박사	Brazil	13 July	A Brazilian natural explorer. She is Professor Ji Gu-bon's friend and he likes her, too.
Doriko	토르코	Brazil	20 December	A student at the same soccer school as Pang-yi. Although he has a laid-back and optimistic personality, his soccer skills cannot be underestimated. He helps Pangi escape despite being captured by the instructor when he escapes the soccer school to watch the samba festival. While Pang-yi was wandering around looking for treasure, his soccer skills improved a lot.
Vice Professor Albert	앨버트 경	UK		A rich English man. He is Professor William's rival. He has a treasure of his own and he likes to make a competition for Pang-yi and Bong Pal-yi team. He wants them to battle to win his treasure.
Tom	톰	UK	27 February	The Student Council President of the boarding school Bok-nam studies at. He also received a message from 008 to find the treasue. His parents died and later adopted by Dr. Bong Pal-yi.
Professor Mahmoud	마흐무트 교수	Turkey	15 April	An architect and Nuree's father. He lies that he is Senan's relative after finding out he isn't. He was forced to aid Mark to help the treasure to preserve their family name.
Carlos valerón	카를로스 바레론	Spain		From Catalonia. A guard guarding the treasure trove of the Alhambra Palace. He is the only witness to the crime scene, but when he learns that the person who stole El Cid's flag was his friend, he quits his job and returns to his hometown to condone it.
Julio	훌리오	Spain		The criminal who stole El Cid's flag. He is a Basque and tries to negotiate with the Spanish government by stealing the flag of El Cid for the independence of his country, Basque Country. In the process, he tries to contact a colleague, but the colleague is captured by Paul and is later assaulted by Paul, but manages to escape and falls into a carriage. When he got on the carriage, Tori and his group were riding in it, and when he noticed that Tori and his group were chasing him, he quickly got back down and got hit by a car and fell into a coma.
Paul	바울	Spain		A member of ETA, an armed group working for Basque independence. He is quite radical and shows a violent side, but he considers the moderates who want to achieve independence in a peaceful way to be traitors to the people who are delaying independence by hundreds of years by negotiating with them. Paul was also looking for the flag of El Cid, and unlike Julio, who wanted to use it for negotiations with the Spanish government, he wanted to express his will for Basque independence by burning the flag in front of all of Spain.
Enriqueta	플라멩코 여성	Spain		A woman who appears as Bong Pal-yi's fiancée at a flamenco performance. She has a very arrogant personality. She openly compares Bong-Pal-yi's subordinates with her own and calls them pathetic While having a good time with Bong Pal-yi such as going shopping together her subordinates watch over Paul threatening Dotori and her group. He believed it and went against Paul as he pleased, but instead her subordinates suffered and she herself ended up being captured.
Thani S. Silachai	타닛	Thailand	17 January	A boxer that can fight using Muay Thai. He and Thani lost their parents in 2004 Indian Ocean earthquake and tsunami.
Kaew		Thailand		A flower seller in the street. She is Thani's younger sister.
Ruud van Basten	얀 바스턴	Netherlands		An Art teacher of the university Nuree studies in Netherlands. He is secretly a Treasure Master. His surname is derived from the footballer Marco van Basten.
Mr. van Basten	바스턴 씨	Netherlands		Ruud's father. A fat man who likes cheese and looks like Santa Claus.
Emily	에밀리	Netherlands		A Dutch florist. Her picture was founded in one of Rud's paintings.
Ugo	차크	Mexico		He believes in Mexican ancient civilisations and rituals. He wants to sacrifice Professor Ji Gu-bon's heart for the ritual.
Billy	빌리	Canada		Bart's best friend, first appears in Treasure Hunting in Canada. He is a hockey player and a native Canadian.
Nguen Bun Hong	훙	Vietnam		The third generation of chef after his father and grandfather, who loves to cook Pho.
Vinh		Vietnam		A professional Vietnamese chef. He wins the best chef of the year prize.
Vivika	비비카	Austria	15 June	An adopted child of President Rudolf. She is a musician who can play violin really good. She is Catherine's cousin.
President Rudolf	칼 마이스너	Austria		A rich Austrian man who adopted Vivika as his daughter. He is secretly a Treasure Master.
Reyna	레나	Israel	19 April	Reyna wants to choose her own religion, but later she wants to be proudly Jewish just like her parents.
Jose	호세	Cuba		A Cuban baseball player.
Amelia	아멜리아	Cuba		Jose's doctor aunt. Professor Ji Gu-bon has a crush on her.
Anna	안보니	Cuba		A female pirate who wants to steal all the treasure in the ocean. She is a relative of Davy Jones.
President Cecil White	세실 화이트	South Africa		A British man who lives in South Africa during times when racism was present.
Tandy	탄디	South Africa		A kid who likes football. She has many part-time jobs.
Rosa	로사	South Africa		Tandy's aunt. She helps President White to find the rainbow diamond. She is also his crush. She died due to AIDS.
Lion King	라이언 킹	South Africa		The antagonist. He is Tandy's boss and President White's nephew. He likes to support football.
Annette	아네트	Switzerland	20 September	She is Pang-yi's partner when they are hunting for treasure. She is a gold digger who likes to get money travel to another countries.
Schneider		Switzerland		Annette's father who was forced by his daughter to give her money.
George	게오르그	Switzerland		A gangster who wants to steal the treasure, and has a crush on Annette.
Johann & Barbara	발터와 벤더	Switzerland		A Swiss middle-aged couple who lend Annette and Pang-yi their residence for free.
Raffi	라위리	New Zealand	7 June	A Maori warrior whose grandfather is a tribal chief. He likes to play rugby. His favourite Rugby team is the All Blacks team.
Kena	케냐 족장	New Zealand		Maori tribal chief. He used to be a Maori warrior. He wants his grandson Raffi to be a Maori warrior just like him.
Antonio	안토니오	Italy		An Italian man from Milan. He asked Pang-yi and Indy to find a treasure for him. He is a rival of Mario.
Mario	마리오	Italy		An Italian man from Naples. He asked Do To-ri and Catherine to find a treasure for him. He is a rival of Antonio.
Francesca	프란체스카	Italy		A greedy Italian woman who is obsessed with valuable treasures. She likes to make a redeem event for people to buy limited treasures.
Joseph	조셉	Philippines		An orphan boy that was raised by Father Martin at the church since he was a kid.
Father Martin	마틴 신부	Philippines		A Filipino priest who raised many orphans at his church.
Jay	제이	Philippines		An emotionless girl who was raised by Father Martin since she was a kid after her parents died because of Typhoon. She was hired by Mark to find a treasure for him. She was forced to be a Treasure Master and betrayed on father Martin.
Professor Loyola	로욜라 교수	Philippines		A Filipino archeologist that keeps the golden plate.
Irene	아이린	Philippines		The daughter of Ita tribal chief. She works as the massage officer.
Count Fersen	페르센 백작	Sweden	16 August	A Swedish guy who likes to hide treasure for a competition. Yi Eun-ju has a crush on him. He is also Dr. Bong Pal-yi's childhood partner in Treasure Hunting in ancient India and Treasure Hunting in Ancient Greek.
Ole	올리	Finland		A Finnish university student who is struggle to find a treasure, so he asked Do To-ri and Doremi for help. He also has a twin brother who likes to cosplay as Moomin.
Santa Claus		Finland		He rescued Do Re-mi from drowning incident.
Saya	사야	Peru		A Peruvian kid who really respects her sister. She help Pang-yi finds treasure in Peru.
Goya	코야	Peru		Saya's older sister. She is a smart university student but got tricked by Dr. Bong Pal-Yi.
Franchi	프란지	Poland		Believing that the red lion is his grandfather, he tries to find the treasure. He is a boy who never loses his smile.
Marry	메리	Poland		Franchi's kind mother
Zhou Lunmi	주륜미	Taiwan		A Mensa member and Jialun's cousin. Pang is a girl around To-ri's age and has a brain as smart as To-ri's She had a smart and intelligent personality. She goes on a treasure hunt with To-ri.
Zhou Jialun	주걸륜	Taiwan	20 November	A boy around To-ri's age and has an exemplary and thoughtful personality. He's the cousin of Lunmi, who goes on a treasure hunt with Pang-yi and teases him for being stupid.
Guanma	관미	Taiwan		Lunmi and Jialun's grandmother. She runs a jade market in Taipei.
Carrel	카렐	Czechia	20 February	He is a Czech boy who likes everything about occultism and black magic and believes in the legend about Golem. He is also a wizard wannabe. He helps Catherine and Do To-ri to find Czech treasure.
Slakinski	슬라킨스키	Czechia		A spy of treasure master that helps Mark to steal treasure in Czechia.

=== Korean Adventure History ===
Name	Korean Name	Dynasty/Era	Birth Date	Description
Cheonjae	천재	Goguryeo		He is Meiling's coach and has skills that are different from his name. As an aside, he is said to be a descendant of Yeon Namgeon, the son of Yeon Gaesomun. And He's a Chinese citizen.
Jyaojeumin	쟈오즈민	Goguryeo		Although she is just like assistant teacher Eunjoo Lee, her skills are worlds apart Dating David
Do Gulwang	도굴왕	Baekje		The legendary grave robber who found more treasures than any archaeologist ends with a mysterious statement in the epilogue of his treasure hunt during the Baekje period.
Lee-il gul	이일구	Baekje		The assistant of the grave robber king who appeared. He is a timid person who divides his bangs 1:9He sneaks a look at Baekje's bracelet relic, but when Bongjaba chases him, he mistakes it for a ghost and sends an SOS to Tori, calling it a curse. Master of Artifact Replication
Sleuth	형사	Baekje		He has a rough-looking personality that makes him look more like a criminal than a criminal, but he is a genuine guy.
Tanaka	다나카	Baekje		Although she is a supporting character, She is also a villain.And she's Japanese
Choi Buja	최부자	Silla/Joseon	26 September	A girl of similar age to Pangi, Tori, and Catherine, but with a bold spirit of Hwarang. She is loved by Pangi and Junior. She dressed as a boy to become a Hwarang. She lost her parents at a young age and grew up receiving a lot of love from her grandfather. She has a fearless personality, is boyish, a nagging person, and has unexpectedly strong strength.
Leader Choi	최 단장님	Silla		He's Buja grandfather. When his granddaughter was young, he took good care of her, guided her, and looked after her well.
Haecho	해초	Unified Silla/Goryeo	3 September	He Dr. Donjuman's assistant His father is a captain, his mother is a diver, and he is an only son A sea man who is excellent at swimming and diving He is compassionate, kind-hearted and straightforward.
Donjuman	돈주만 박사	Unified Silla/Goryeo		One of the three genius archaeologists along with Jigubon and Dotoran If Portus is the gubon and Athos is the dotoran, then Donjuman is Aramis He major is underwater archeology. Survives dramatically on the uninhabited islands of Wando with incredible swimming skills
David	다비트	Balhae		Lee Eunju once liked him and is a Russian agent.
Captain Lee Chung-seong	리충성 대장	Goryeo		North Korean representative of the North-South joint excavation team Tori and Haecho are shocked when they first see each other due to their strong and blunt appearance, as expected from North Koreans, but they are actually soft on the inside.
Junior M	주니어 M	Joseon/Japanese occupation	15 January	Sir M's son. Become friends with Pangi He likes Buja and Catherine.
Adolf (Sir A)	아돌프(A경)	Joseon		He is the second-in-command and senior chairman of the Treasure Master and a close friend of Sir M, and is called Sir A within the organization. Junior calls him Uncle Adolf and seems to follow him well.
Hong Duna	홍두나	Joseon		A girl around Pangi Tori's age She is a model student, very smart and intelligent.
Go Mulwang	고물왕	Joseon		An antique rich man who lives in a junk shop. The real name is Lee Ha-eung. He don't buy or sell junk, and the doorbell has an explosive device.
Secret Agent 700	비밀 요원 700	Japanese occupation	21 April	Advanced Special Agent sent to Independence Gate for investigation
Bori	보리	Northern and Southern States period		He is a North Korean defector boy He is introverted but kind-hearted.
Bori grandfather	보리의 할아버지	Northern and Southern States period		At the time of the story, he is already deceased. He was originally from Daeseong-dong in South Korea, but was taken as a student soldier during the Korean War and was left in North Korea due to the division of North and South Korea. He eventually attempts to escape North Korea with Bori, but is seriously injured during the escape and dies, leaving only Bori with a walkie-talkie. Still, the funeral is held with Bongpal-i help.
Bori little grandfather	보리의 작은 할아버지	Northern and Southern States period		Bori's grandfather was separated from his older brother due to the Korean War. He hid the walkie-talkie he shared with his older brother in his hometown of Daeseong-dong when he was young, and was anxiously waiting for his older brother to return. In the end, he reunites with Bori who finds the radio, but since his older brother was no longer of this world, he weeps when he hears from Bori about his brother's death. He is quite fond of lemons, and even in his stamp album there is a doodle drawn with lemon juice depicting a meeting with his older brother.

=== World Civilization Adventure History ===
Name	Korean Name	Ancient	Birth Date	Description
Paris			15 October	Bong Pal-yi in youth. Main protagonist in the prequel series.
Diana	다이애나		28 June	A silly British girl, Dr. Bong Pal-yi's childhood friend and she also has a crush on him and Mark.
Sir Wellington	웰링턴 경			A rich British man who is Diana's father. He is mostly a supporting character.

=== World Cities Adventure History ===
Name	Korean Name	City	Birth Date	Description
Sasha		Shanghai	21 April	
Professor Jang		Shanghai		
Jean Gomez		LA	30 June	
Felicity Enders		LA		
Mary Jane		LA		
Pangi Greataunt		LA		
Mr. Ochon		LA		
Akina		Osaka	28 August	
Kaishi		Osaka		
Akina Mother		Osaka		
Akina Grandmother		Osaka		
Mikiharu		Osaka		
Kara		Toronto	31 October	
Rascal		Toronto		
Gilbirt		Toronto		
Annie		Toronto		
Merry		Toronto		
Isabel		Sydney	30 January	
Andrew Linden		London	26 April	
Harold Linden		London		
Linden Grandfather		London		
Daisy		London		
Erik		London		
Nancy and Julie		London		
Kevin		London		
Andrei		Moscow		
Boris		Moscow		
Anna		Moscow		
Sonya		Jakarta		
Dian		Jakarta		
Ice		Jakarta		
Fusia Resin		Jarkata		
Melissa		Seoul		
Meryl		Seoul		
Han Rahi		Jeju Island		
Han Rami		Jeju Island		
Granma Wang		Jeju Island		
Professor Go Buyang		Jeju Island	10 January	
Park Sooyoung		Busan		
Adam Lee		Busan	22 August	
Haeundae Group		Busan		
Howard Lee		Busan		
Hyeon		Busan		
Happy		Busan		
Adriina		Rome/ Lisbon	12 August	
Matia		Rom		
Colleen		Rome		
Giacomo		Rome		
Chompu		Bangkok		
Tony Kun		Bangkok		
Nen Nen Monk		Bangkok		
Toon		Bangkok		
Ho lang i		Istanbul	27 August	
Jerome Bonaparte		Paris	5 November	
Jerome Maid		Paris		
Lydia Holmes		Singapore/Hanoi	17 January	
Brad Lee		Singapore		
Juliet Morgan		New york		
Savona		New york		
Rashi		New york		
Marija		Lisbon		
Huynh Quang Long		Hanoi	19 January	
Kain		Hanoi	31 December	
Karl		Berlin		
Jenny		Berlin		
Yakup Gang		Berlin		
Jasmine		Doha		
Balla		Budapest		
Garbo		Budapest		
Mrs. Julia		Budapest		
Iolana		Hawaii		
Marina		Galapagos		
Juan		Galapagos		
Eleni		Santorini		
Nikos		Santorini		

== Titles ==
=== World Adventure History (세계 탐험 시리즈) ===
No.	Title	Original title	Date of publication	ISBN
1	Treasure Hunting in Iraq	이라크에서 보물찾기	10 December 2003	
2	Treasure Hunting in France	프랑스에서 보물찾기	20 January 2004	978-9-8108-8858-9
3	Treasure Hunting in China	중국에서 보물찾기	3 May 2004	978-9-8108-8870-1
4	Treasure Hunting in India	인도에서 보물찾기	12 October 2004	978-9-8108-9095-7
5	Treasure Hunting in Egypt	이집트에서 보물찾기	2 February 2005	978-9-8108-9095-7
6	Treasure Hunting in America	미국에서 보물찾기	29 April 2005	978-9-8108-9309-5
7	Treasure Hunting in Japan	일본에서 보물찾기	15 September 2005	978-9-8108-9308-8
8	Treasure Hunting in Greece	그리스에서 보물찾기	20 December 2005	
9	Treasure Hunting in Russia	러시아에서 보물찾기	1 March 2006	
10	Treasure Hunting in Germany	독일에서 보물찾기	17 May 2006	978-9-8107-3058-1
11	Treasure Hunting in Australia	호주에서 보물찾기	4 September 2006	
12	Treasure Hunting in Brazil	브라질에서 보물찾기	15 December 2006	978-9-8107-1962-3
13	Treasure Hunting in UK	영국에서 보물찾기	27 February 2007	
14	Treasure Hunting in Turkey	튀르키예에서 보물찾기	30 May 2007	978-9-8109-5581-6
15	Treasure Hunting in Spain	스페인에서 보물찾기	30 August 2007	978-9-8107-2756-7
16	Treasure Hunting in Thailand	태국에서 보물찾기	17 January 2008	
17	Treasure Hunting in the Netherlands	네덜란드에서 보물찾기	21 April 2008	978-9-8107-5596-6
18	Treasure Hunting in Mexico	멕시코에서 보물찾기	21 July 2008	978-9-8107-2602-7
19	Treasure Hunting in Canada	캐나다에서 보물찾기	25 November 2008	978-9-8107-6084-7
20	Treasure Hunting in Vietnam	베트남에서 보물찾기	10 March 2009	978-9-8107-6183-7
21	Treasure Hunting in Austria	오스트리아에서 보물찾기	15 June 2009	978-9-8107-6824-9
22	Treasure Hunting in Israel	이스라엘에서 보물찾기	30 October 2009	
23	Treasure Hunting in Cuba	쿠바에서 보물찾기	22 February 2010	978-9-6705-4271-3
24	Treasure Hunting in South Africa	남아공에서 보물찾기	1 June 2010	978-9-8107-1783-4
25	Treasure Hunting in Switzerland	스위스에서 보물찾기	20 September 2010	978-9-8107-1581-6
26	Treasure Hunting in New Zealand	뉴질랜드에서 보물찾기	8 June 2011	978-9-8107-7497-4
27	Treasure Hunting in Italy part 1	이탈리아에서 보물찾기 1	24 August 2011	
28	Treasure Hunting in Italy part 2	이탈리아에서 보물찾기 2	27 November 2011	
29	Treasure hunting in the Philippines	필리핀에서 보물찾기	30 May 2012	978-9-8109-4822-1
30	Treasure Hunting in Sweden	스웨덴에서 보물찾기	16 August 2012	978-9-8109-6282-1
31	Treasure Hunting in Finland	핀란드에서 보물찾기	25 January 2013	978-9-8109-9050-3
32	Treasure Hunting in Peru	페루에서 보물찾기	14 May 2013	978-9-8109-8372-7
33	Treasure Hunting in Poland	폴란드에서 보물찾기	19 August 2013	978-9-8111-0238-7
34	Treasure Hunting in Taiwan	대만에서 보물찾기	20 November 2013	978-9-8111-0798-6
35	Treasure Hunting in the Czech Republic	체코에서 보물찾기	20 February 2014	978-9-8109-9527-0
36	Treasure Hunting in Argentina	아르헨티나에서 보물찾기	9 April 2026	
37	Treasure Hunting in Iceland	아이슬란드에서 보물찾기	3 November 2026	

=== Korean Adventure History (한국사 시리즈) ===
No.	Title	Original title	Date of publication
1	Treasure Hunting in Goguryeo 1	고구려 시대 보물찾기 1	30 December 2010
2	Treasure Hunting in Goguryeo 2	고구려 시대 보물찾기 2	29 March 2011
3	Treasure Hunting in Baekje 1	백제 시대 보물찾기 1	30 October 2011
4	Treasure Hunting in Baekje 2	백제 시대 보물찾기 2	30 March 2012
5	Treasure Hunting in Silla 1	신라 시대 보물찾기 1	28 September 2012
6	Treasure Hunting in Silla 2	신라 시대 보물찾기 2	29 November 2012
7	Treasure Hunting in Later Silla	통일 신라 시대 보물찾기	10 March 2013
8	Treasure Hunting in Balhae	발해 시대 보물찾기	25 September 2013
9	Treasure Hunting in Goryeo 1	고려 시대 보물찾기 1	27 March 2014
10	Treasure Hunting in Goryeo 2	고려 시대 보물찾기 2	30 June 2014
11	Treasure Hunting in Goryeo 3	고려 시대 보물찾기 3	26 October 2014
12	Treasure Hunting in Joseon 1	조선 시대 보물찾기 1	15 January 2015
13	Treasure Hunting in Joseon 2	조선 시대 보물찾기 2	30 April 2015
14	Treasure Hunting in Joseon 3	조선 시대 보물찾기 3	31 July 2015
15	Treasure Hunting in Joseon 4	조선 시대 보물찾기 4	29 October 2015
16	Treasure Hunting in Joseon 5	조선 시대 보물찾기 5	25 February 2016
17	Treasure Hunting in Japanese occupation 1	일제강점기 보물찾기 1	26 April 2016
18	Treasure Hunting in Japanese occupation 2	일제강점기 보물찾기 2	25 August 2016
19	Treasure Hunting in Japanese occupation 3	일제강점기 보물찾기 3	25 October 2016
20	Treasure Hunting in Korean War	남북한 시대 보물찾기	23 February 2017

=== World Civilization Adventure History (세계사 시리즈) ===
No.	Title	Original title	Date of publication
1	Treasure Hunting in Mesopotamia	메소포타미아 문명 보물찾기	28 June 2013
2	Treasure Hunting in Ancient Egypt 1	이집트 문명 보물찾기 1	26 December 2013
3	Treasure Hunting in Ancient Egypt 2	이집트 문명 보물찾기 2	22 May 2014
4	Treasure Hunting in Indus Valley Civilization	인더스 문명 보물찾기	25 August 2014
5	Treasure Hunting in Yellow River civilization	중국 황허 문명 보물찾기	25 November 2014
6	Treasure Hunting in Persian Empire	페르시아 제국 보물찾기	10 March 2015
7	Treasure Hunting in Ancient Greece 1	그리스 문명 보물찾기 1	29 May 2015
8	Treasure Hunting in Ancient Greece 2	그리스 문명 보물찾기 2	30 December 2015
9	Treasure Hunting in Roman Empire 1	로마 제국 보물찾기 1	28 June 2016
10	Treasure Hunting in Roman Empire 2	로마 제국 보물찾기 2	27 December 2016

=== World Cities Adventure History (세계 도시 탐험 시리즈) ===
No.	Title	Original title	Date of publication
1	Treasure Hunting in Shanghai	상하이에서 보물찾기	21 April 2017
2	Treasure Hunting in Los Angeles	LA에서 보물찾기	30 June 2017
3	Treasure Hunting in Osaka	오사카에서 보물찾기	28 August 2017
4	Treasure Hunting in Vancouver	벤쿠버에서 보물찾기	31 October 2017
5	Treasure Hunting in Sydney	시드니에서 보물찾기	30 January 2018
	Treasure Hunting in Pyeongchang	평창에서 보물찾기	Published in conjunction with Pyeongchang Winter Olympics
6	Treasure Hunting in London	런던에서 보물찾기	26 April 2018
7	Treasure Hunting in Moscow	모스크바에서 보물찾기	26 June 2018
8	Treasure Hunting in Jakarta	자카르타에서 보물찾기	23 August 2018
9	Treasure Hunting in Seoul 1	서울에서 보물찾기 1	30 October 2018
10	Treasure Hunting in Seoul 2	서울에서 보물찾기 2	27 December 2018
11	Treasure Hunting in Jeju 1	제주에서 보물찾기 1	14 March 2019
12	Treasure Hunting in Jeju 2	제주에서 보물찾기 2	23 May 2019
13	Treasure Hunting in Busan 1	부산에서 보물찾기 1	22 August 2019
14	Treasure Hunting in Busan 2	부산에서 보물찾기 2	22 November 2019
15	Treasure Hunting in Rome	로마에서 보물찾기	6 February 2020
16	Treasure Hunting in Bangkok	방콕에서 보물찾기	21 May 2020
17	Treasure Hunting in Istanbul	이스탄불에서 보물찾기	27 August 2020
18	Treasure Hunting in Paris	파리에서 보물찾기	5 November 2020
19	Treasure Hunting in Singapore	싱가포르에서 보물찾기	18 February 2021
20	Treasure Hunting in New York	뉴욕에서 보물찾기	27 May 2021
21	Treasure Hunting in Lisbon	리스본에서 보물찾기	12 August 2021
22	Treasure Hunting in Hanoi	하노이에서 보물찾기	25 November 2021
23	Treasure Hunting in Berlin	베를린에서 보물찾기	1 April 2022
24	Treasure Hunting in Doha	도하에서 보물찾기	20 September 2022
25	Treasure Hunting in Budapest	부다페스트에서 보물찾기	28 February 2023
26	Treasure Hunting in Hawaii	하와이에서 보물찾기	13 July 2023
27	Treasure Hunting in Galapagos	갈라파고스에서 보물찾기	12 March 2024
28	Treasure Hunting in Santorini	산토리니에서 보물찾기	30 July 2024
29	Treasure Hunting in Quebec	퀘벡에서 보물찾기	7 January 2025
30	Treasure Hunting in Mumbai	뭄바이에서 보물찾기	27 May 2025
31	Treasure Hunting in Dubai	두바이에서 보물찾기	19 November 2025

=== The Best Gourmet In The World (천하제일 미식 시리즈) ===
No.	Title	Original title	Date of publication
1	The Best Gourmet In The World Treasure Hunting Asia Arc	천하제일 미식 보물찾기 아시아 편	13 November 2023
