= Seodaemun Independence Park =

Park in Seoul, South Korea

- 서대문독립공원
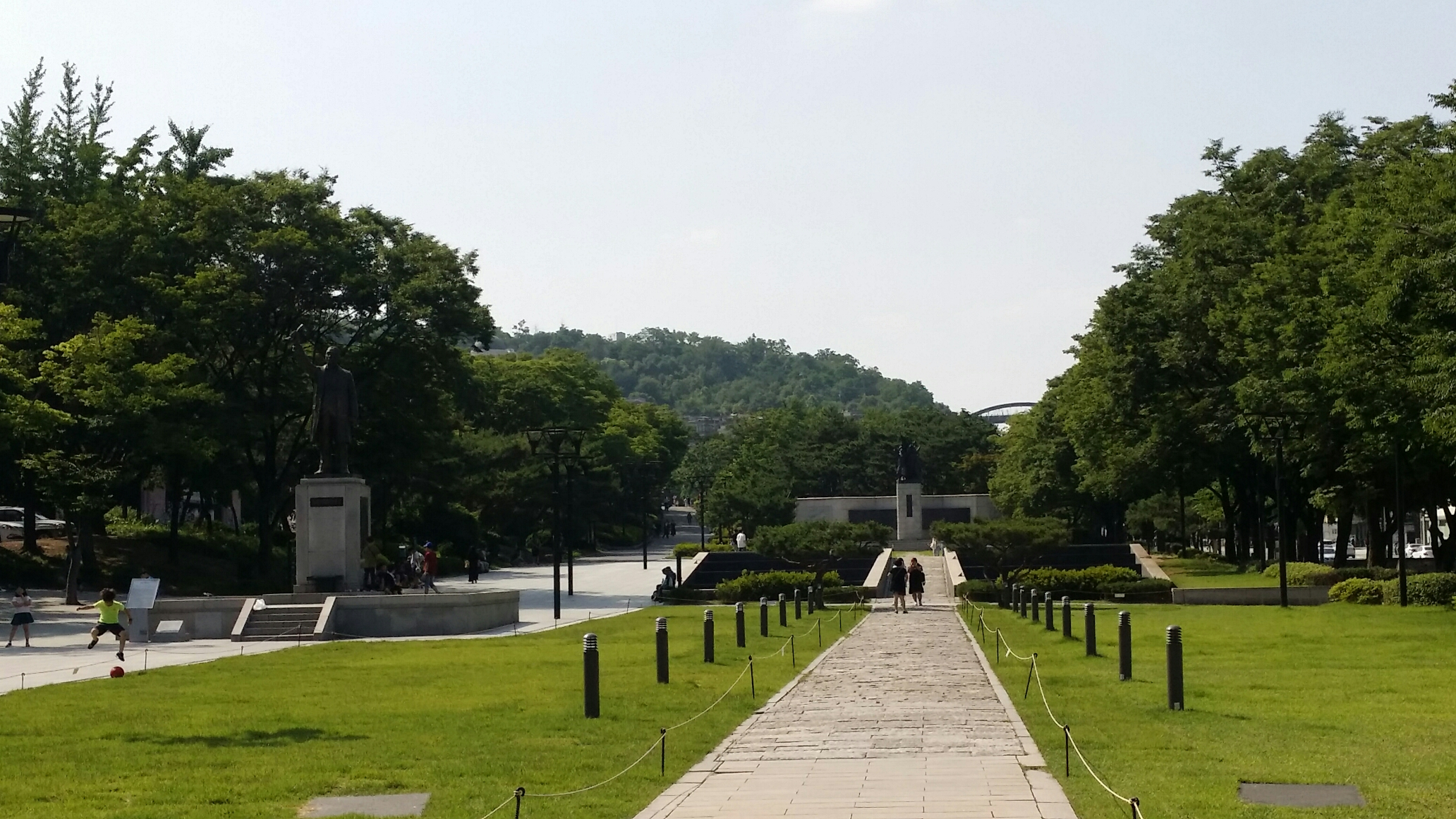
- Southern area of the Park
- Interactive map of Seodaemun Independence Park
- Type: Municipal Park
- Location: Seodaemun District, Seoul
- Coordinates: 37.5752858°N 126.9550192°E
- Created: August 15, 1992
- Operator: Seodaemun District
- Status: open
- Website: VisitSeoulNet

Seodaemun Independence Park (Korean: 서대문독립공원) is an educational and cultural park located in Hyeonjeo-dong, Seodaemun District, Seoul, South Korea. The park contains various monuments and buildings, most notably the Seodaemun Prison Museum. The park receives nearly half a million visitors annually.

== Overview ==
The name Seodaemun means literally "West Great Gate." This is a colloquial name of Donuimun, one of the former Eight Gates of Seoul, which was torn down in 1915. Even though the gate no longer survives, this area of Seoul still carries the name Seodaemun.

Seodaemun Independence Park contains:

1. Seodaemun Prison, originally built in 1907, currently a museum
2. Independence Gate (Dongnimmun, 독립문), completed in 1897, modeled after the Arc de Triomphe in Paris
3. Plinths of Yeongeunmun Gate, which is remnants of Yeongeunmun that was intentionally destroyed in 1895
4. Patriotic Martyr Monument
5. Independence Hall (Dongnipgwan, 독립관), rebuilding of a structure originally built in 1407
6. Statue of Seo Jae-pil, Korean independence activist
7. Declaration of Independence Monument
8. Independence Square (the southwest entrance to the park)
9. Visitor Center

== Location ==
Seodaemun Independence Park is easily accessed from exits 4 or 5 of the Dongnimmun Station on.
