= Anping Creek =

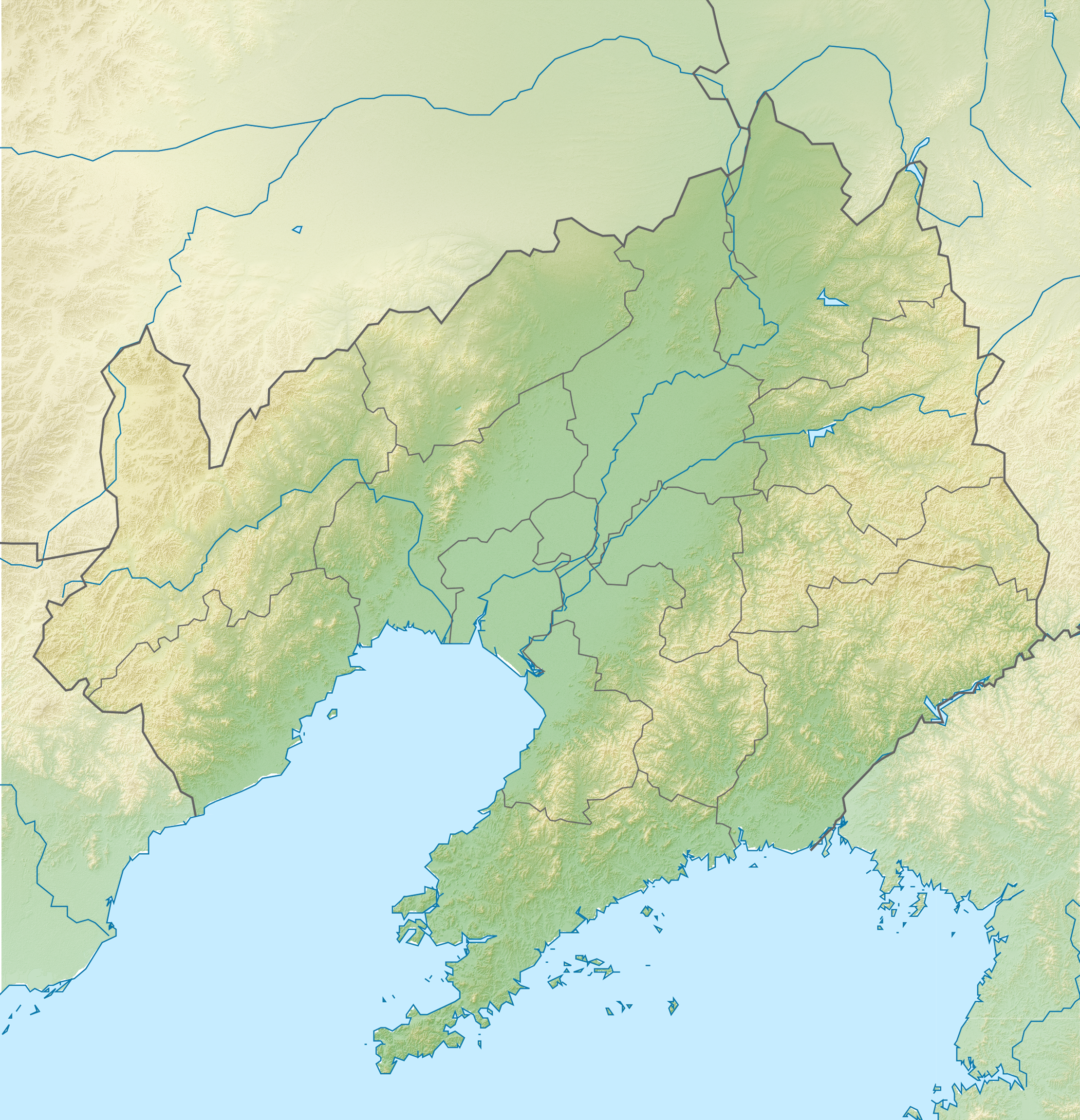
- Location of mouth in Liaoning Province

Location
- Country: China
- Province: Liaoning Province

Physical characteristics
- Mouth
  - coordinates: 40.31875404125569°N 124.70902071484124°E

Anping Creek or the An-ping River (Chinese: 安平河) is a creek in Liaoning Province, China.

It is a tributary of the Yalu River whose mouth is located at Gulouzi Township.

It formed part of the boundary between Russian-occupied Chinese Manchuria and Japanese Manchuria, as set forth in the Treaty of Shimonoseki in AD 1895.
