= Li Jingfang =

Chinese statesman

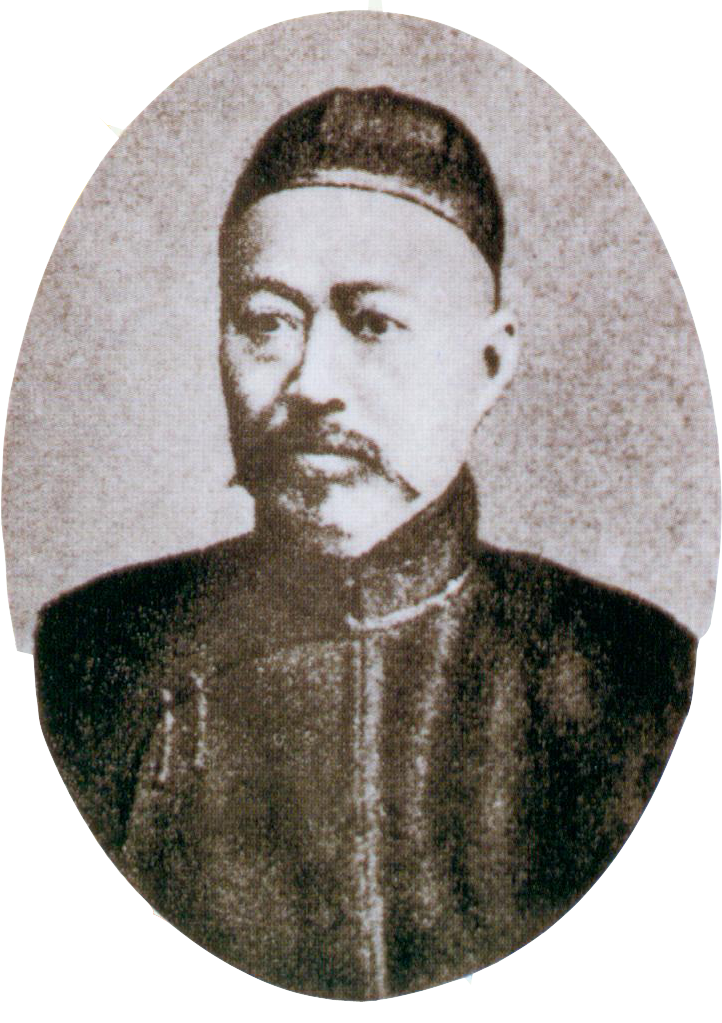
Li Jingfang

Li Jingfang GCVO (李經方; 1854 – 28 September 1934), also known as Li Ching-fong, was a Chinese statesman during the Qing dynasty. Being the nephew and adopted son of the late statesman Li Hongzhang, he served in his adoptive father's secretariat in his youth. In 1882, Li Jingfang obtained the second highest degree in the imperial examinations and subsequently obtained appointment in the Qing foreign service because of his knowledge of English. In 1886–89, he worked as a secretary to the Qing legation in London and in 1890-92 he served as the Qing minister to Japan. He is mostly known for having signed the Sino-Japanese Treaty of Shimonoseki in Li Hongzhang's stead in 1895. He was appointed as an Honorary Knight Commander of the Royal Victorian Order by Queen Victoria in 1896 and was promoted to an Honorary Knight Grand Cross a few years later in 1909. He also served as the Chinese Minister to London in 1909–1910.

== Life ==
Li Jingfang was originally the son of Li Zhaoqing, the sixth younger brother of Li Hongzhang. In 1862, Li Hongzhang was over 40 years old and still had no children, so Li Zhaoqing adopted Li Jingfang to Li Hongzhang, who referred to him as his "eldest son."

In 1877, Li Jingfang and his eldest younger brother Li Jingshu studied at the Viceroy of Zhili's Office in Tianjin under the tutelage of Hong Rukui. In 1890, he was appointed Resident Minister to Japan. In 1894, the Sino-Japanese Yellow Sea Battle (Battle of the Yalu River) broke out, and Li Jingfang returned to China.

In 1895, Li Jingfang accompanied Li Hongzhang to Shimonoseki, Yamaguchi Prefecture in Japan to negotiate the Treaty of Shimonoseki. As the Qing government's plenipotentiary, he was responsible for "handing over Taiwan" and was thus known as the "Taiwan Cession Envoy". On June 1, Li Jingfang arrived in Taiwan on the German steamship Gerechtigkeit. On June 2, accompanied by translators Lu Yongming and Tao Dajun, he signed the "Taiwan Handover Document" with Admiral Kabayama Sukenori, the first Japanese Governor-General of Taiwan, off the coast of Cape Santiago in Keelung. The document stipulated that "all forts, arsenals, and public property belonging to the various ports and prefectures of the entire island of Taiwan and the Penghu Islands" would be handed over to Japan. Li Jingfang chose to conduct the sovereignty handover on board a Japanese warship off the coast of Keelung to avoid angry locals. Kabayama had asked Li "why not go ashore to sign it," to which Li replied, "The Taiwanese people are very resentful and I am afraid of being assassinated."

In 1905, Li Jingfang was appointed Minister of Commerce by the Qing government. In 1907, he became Resident Minister to Britain. In 1911, he was transferred to the post of Left Vice-Minister of Posts and Communications. After much effort to negotiate with foreigners, Li Jingfang was appointed the first Director-General of the Chinese General Postal Administration.
