= Dongnimmun station =

Subway station in Seoul, South Korea

독립문 (감리교신학대학교); Dongnimmun (Methodist Theological Univ.)
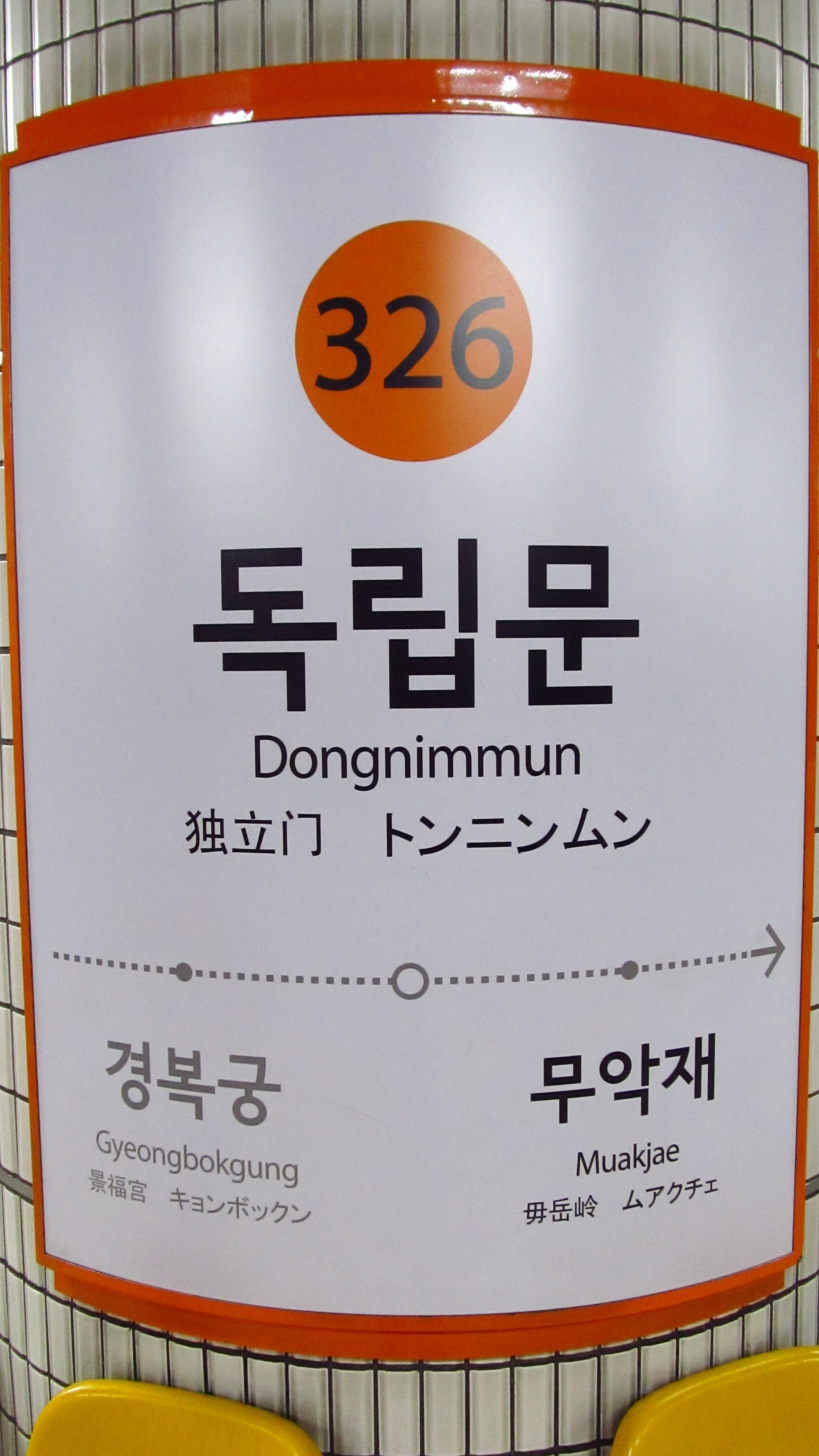

Korean name
- Hangul: 독립문역
- Hanja: 獨立門驛
- Revised Romanization: Dongnimmunnyeok
- McCune–Reischauer: Tongnimmunnyŏk

General information
- Location: 101 Hyeonjeo-dong, 247 Tongillo Jiha, Seodaemun-gu, Seoul
- Coordinates: 37°34′28″N 126°57′29″E
- Operator: Seoul Metro
- Line: Line 3
- Platforms: 1
- Tracks: 2

Construction
- Structure type: Underground

History
- Opened: Line 3: July 12, 1985

Passengers
- (Daily) Based on Jan-Dec of 2012. Line 3: 15,772
Location

Dongnimmun Station (Korean: 독립문역) is a station on the Seoul Subway Line 3 in Seodaemun District, Seoul, South Korea. It is named after the nearby Independence Gate.

== Station layout ==
G	Street level	Exit

L1; Concourse	Lobby	Customer Service, Shops, Vending machines, ATMs

L2; Platform	Northbound	← Line 3 toward Daehwa (Muakjae)
L2; Platform	Island platform, doors will open on the left
L2; Platform	Southbound	Line 3 toward Ogeum (Gyeongbokgung) →

== Vicinity ==
- Exit 1: Inwangsan, Fortress Wall of Seoul, Inwangsan IPark
- Exit 2: Muak-dong regional government
- Exit 3: Dongnimmun Elementary School
  - Exit 3-1: Muak Hyundai apartment complex
- Exit 4: Independence Gate
- Exit 5: Seodaemun Independence Park, Seodaemun Prison History Hall, National Memorial of the Korean Provisional Government, Hansung Science High School

Preceding station	Seoul Metropolitan Subway	Following station
Muakjae towards Daehwa	Line 3	Gyeongbokgung towards Ogeum
