= Treaty of Shimonoseki =

1895 treaty ending the First Sino-Japanese War

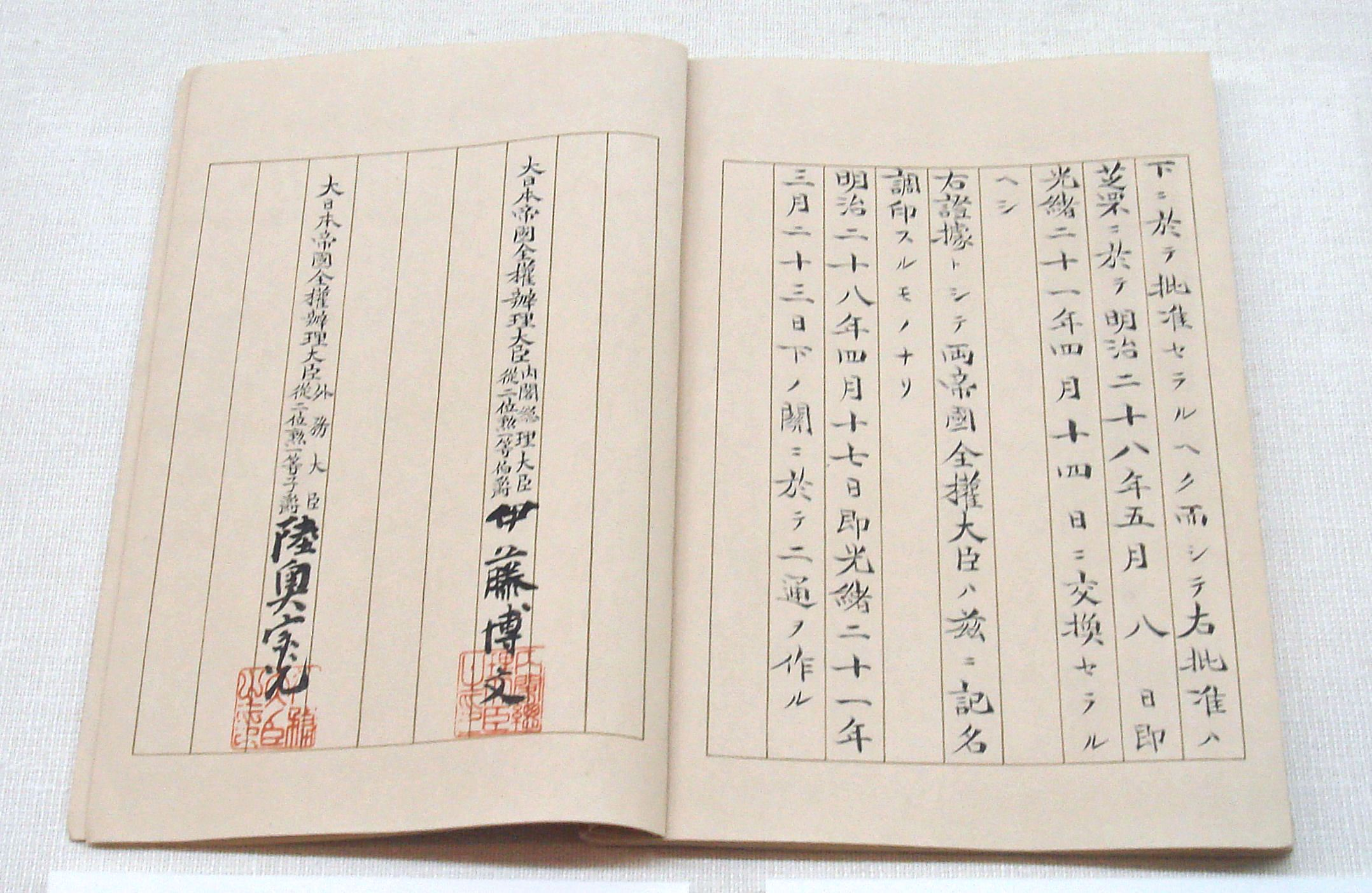
- Japanese version of the Treaty of Shimonoseki, April 17, 1895
- Type: Treaty
- Signed: April 17, 1895
- Location: Shimonoseki, Japan
- Effective: May 8, 1895
- Signatories: (Qing dynasty) Li Hongzhang, Li Jingfang; (Empire of Japan) Itō Hirobumi, Mutsu Munemitsu
- Parties: (Qing dynasty) Qing Empire; (Empire of Japan) Japan
- Depositary: National Palace Museum, Taiwan; National Archives of Japan
- Language: Chinese and Japanese

Treaty of Shimonoseki

Chinese name
- Traditional Chinese: 下關條約
- Simplified Chinese: 下关条约
Transcriptions
Standard Mandarin
- Hanyu Pinyin: Xiàguān tiáoyuē
Southern Min
- Hokkien POJ: Hā-koan Tiâu-iok

Japanese name
- Kanji: 下関条約
Transcriptions
- Romanization: Shimonoseki Jōyaku

Treaty of Bakan

Chinese name
- Traditional Chinese: 馬關條約
- Simplified Chinese: 马关条约
Transcriptions
Standard Mandarin
- Hanyu Pinyin: Mǎguān tiáoyuē
Southern Min
- Hokkien POJ: Má-koan Tiâu-iok

Japanese name
- Kyūjitai: 馬關條約
- Shinjitai: 馬関条約
Transcriptions
- Romanization: Bakan Jōyaku

Japanese sphere of influence Annexed by Japan Annexed by Japan, but temporarily sold due to the Triple Intervention; Southern part was later reannexed after the Russo-Japanese War

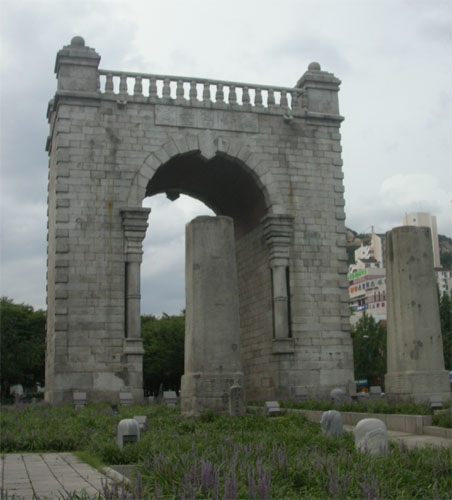
Independence Gate (front), Seoul, South Korea A symbol of the end of Korea's tributary relationship with the Qing Empire

The Treaty of Shimonoseki (Japanese: 下関条約, Hepburn: Shimonoseki Jōyaku), also known as the Treaty of Maguan (Note: (Chinese: 馬關條約; pinyin: Mǎguān Tiáoyuē; Pe̍h-ōe-jī: Má-koan Tiâu-iok)) in China or the Treaty of Bakan (馬關條約, Bakan Jōyaku) in Japan, was signed in Shimonoseki, Japan, on April 17, 1895, between the Empire of Japan and the Qing dynasty. The treaty ended the First Sino-Japanese War, in which the Japanese decisively defeated the Chinese land and naval forces. The treaty was signed at the Shunpanrō hotel by Count Itō Hirobumi and Viscount Mutsu Munemitsu for Japan and Li Hongzhang and his son Li Jingfang on behalf of China.

The peace conference took place from March 20 to April 17, 1895, and the treaty followed and superseded the Sino-Japanese Friendship and Trade Treaty of 1871. It consisted of 11 articles which provided for the termination of China's tributary relations with Korea; required that China pay an indemnity of 200 million taels and cede Taiwan (Formosa), the Penghu (Pescadores) Islands, and the Liaodong Peninsula to Japan; and opened four cities (Shashi, Chongqing, Suzhou, and Hangzhou) to Japan as trading ports. However, due to the diplomatic Triple Intervention of Russia, Germany, and France just one week after the treaty was signed, the Japanese withdrew their claim to the Liaodong Peninsula in return for an additional war indemnity of 30 million taels from China.

Chinese scholars and officials vigorously opposed the harsh terms of the treaty, but it was ratified by the Guangxu Emperor. The cession of Taiwan and the Penghu Islands met with strong resistance by the local populace, and the islands were not taken over by Japan until October 1895. At the end of the Second Sino-Japanese War in 1945, Japan surrendered and later signed the Treaty of Taipei with the Republic of China on 28 April 1952, which officially abrogated the Treaty of Shimonoseki.

== Treaty terms ==
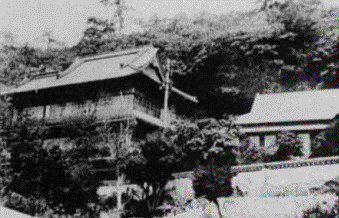
The Shunpanrō hall where the Treaty of Shimonoseki was signed. The original building was destroyed due to bombings in WWII. The Sino-Japanese Peace Treaty Memorial Hall (日清講和記念館) next to it was built in 1937 to commemorate the signing of this treaty.

- Article 1: China recognizes definitively the full and complete independence and autonomy of Korea, and, in consequence, the payment of tribute and the performance of ceremonies and formalities by Korea to China, that are in derogation of such independence and autonomy, shall wholly cease for the future.
- Articles 2 & 3: China cedes to Japan in perpetuity and full sovereignty of the Penghu (Pescadores) Islands, Taiwan (Formosa) and the Liaodong Peninsula together with all fortifications, arsenals, and public property.
- Article 4: China agrees to pay to Japan as a war indemnity the sum of 200,000,000 Kuping taels ( 7,500,000 kilograms/16,534,500 pounds of silver).
- Article 5: China opens Shashi (Shashih), Chongqing (Chungking), Suzhou (Soochow) and Hangzhou (Hangchow) to Japan. Moreover, China is to grant Japan most favoured nation status for foreign trade (which is equal to, not above, the trade relations granted to the United Kingdom, United States, and France in 1843–44 and to Russia in 1858),

The treaty ended the First Sino-Japanese War of 1894–1895 as a clear victory for Japan.

China recognized the "full and complete independence and autonomy" of Joseon (the kingdom of Korea) and formally renounced China's traditional tributary system. The ceremonies in which Joseon respecting the political influence of China by paying tribute were permanently abolished. In the next year, the Yeongeunmun gate outside Seoul, where those ceremonies were performed, was demolished leaving its two stone pillars.

China ceded to Japan the Island of Taiwan, the Penghu Islands, and the Liaodong Peninsula in the southern part of present-day Liaoning province (including the city of Dalian). However, Liaodong was subsequently returned to Qing dynasty due to diplomatic intervention of Russia, Germany, and France, which forced Japan to back down and withdraw from the peninsula in the same year.

China paid Japan a war indemnity of 200 million Kuping taels, paid over seven years.

China opened various ports and rivers to Japanese trade, and granted Japan the same status regarding trade as various western powers had gained in the aftermath of the First and Second Opium Wars.

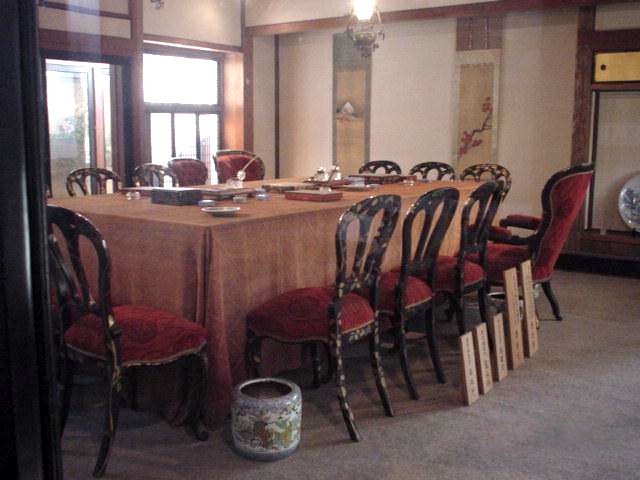
Reconstructed Shunpanrō interior in the Sino-Japanese Peace Treaty Memorial Hall

=== Value of the indemnity ===
Qing China's indemnity to Japan of 200 million silver Kuping taels, or about 240,000,000 troy ounces (7,500 t). After the Triple intervention, they paid another 30 million taels for a total of over 276,000,000 troy ounces (8,600 t) silver, worth about $5 billion US dollars in 2015. (Note: Assuming $18/oz, in 2015.)

=== Treaty and Taiwan ===
During the summit between Japanese and Qing representatives in March and April 1895, Prime Minister Itō Hirobumi and Foreign Minister Mutsu Munemitsu wanted to reduce the power of the Qing dynasty on not only the Korean Peninsula but also the Taiwan islands. Moreover, Mutsu had already noticed its importance in order to expand Japanese military power towards South China and Southeast Asia. It was also the age of imperialism, so Japan wished to mimic what the Western nations were doing. Imperial Japan was seeking colonies and resources in the Korean Peninsula and mainland China to compete with the presence of Western powers at that time. This was the way the Japanese leadership chose to illustrate how fast Imperial Japan had advanced compared to the West since the 1867 Meiji Restoration, and the extent it wanted to amend the unequal treaties that were held in the Far East by the Western powers.

At the peace conference between Imperial Japan and the Qing dynasty, Li Hongzhang and Li Jingfang, the ambassadors at the negotiation desk of the Qing dynasty, originally did not plan to cede Taiwan because they also realized Taiwan's great location for trading with the West. Therefore, even though the Qing had lost wars against Britain and France in the 19th century, the Qing emperor was serious about keeping Taiwan under its rule, which began in 1683. On March 20, 1895, at Shunpanrō (春帆楼) in Shimonoseki in Japan, a one month long peace conference began.

At the first half of the conference, Ito and Li talked mainly about a cease-fire agreement, and during the second half of the conference, the contents of the peace treaty were discussed. Ito and Mutsu claimed that yielding the full sovereignty of Taiwan was an absolute condition and requested Li to hand over full sovereignty of the Penghu Islands and the eastern portion of the bay at the southern tip of the Liaodong Peninsula. Li Hongzhang refused on the grounds that Taiwan had never been a battlefield during the first Sino-Japanese War between 1894 and 1895. By the final stage of the conference, while Li Hongzhang agreed to the transfer of full sovereignty of the Penghu islands and the portion of Liaodong to Imperial Japan, he still refused to hand over Taiwan. As Taiwan had been a province since 1885, Li stated, "Taiwan is already a province, and therefore not to be given away (臺灣已立一行省，不能送給他國)."

However, Imperial Japan had the military advantage, and eventually Li gave Taiwan up. On April 17, 1895, the peace treaty between Imperial Japan and the Qing dynasty had been signed and was followed by the successful Japanese invasion of Taiwan. This had a huge and lasting impact on Taiwan, the turning over of the island to Imperial Japan marking the end of 200 years of Qing rule despite local resistance in Taiwan against the annexation, which was quashed swiftly by the Japanese. Therefore, Taiwan was under Japanese rule from 1895 to 1945, until the end of World War II by the surrender of Japan.

== Signatories and diplomats ==
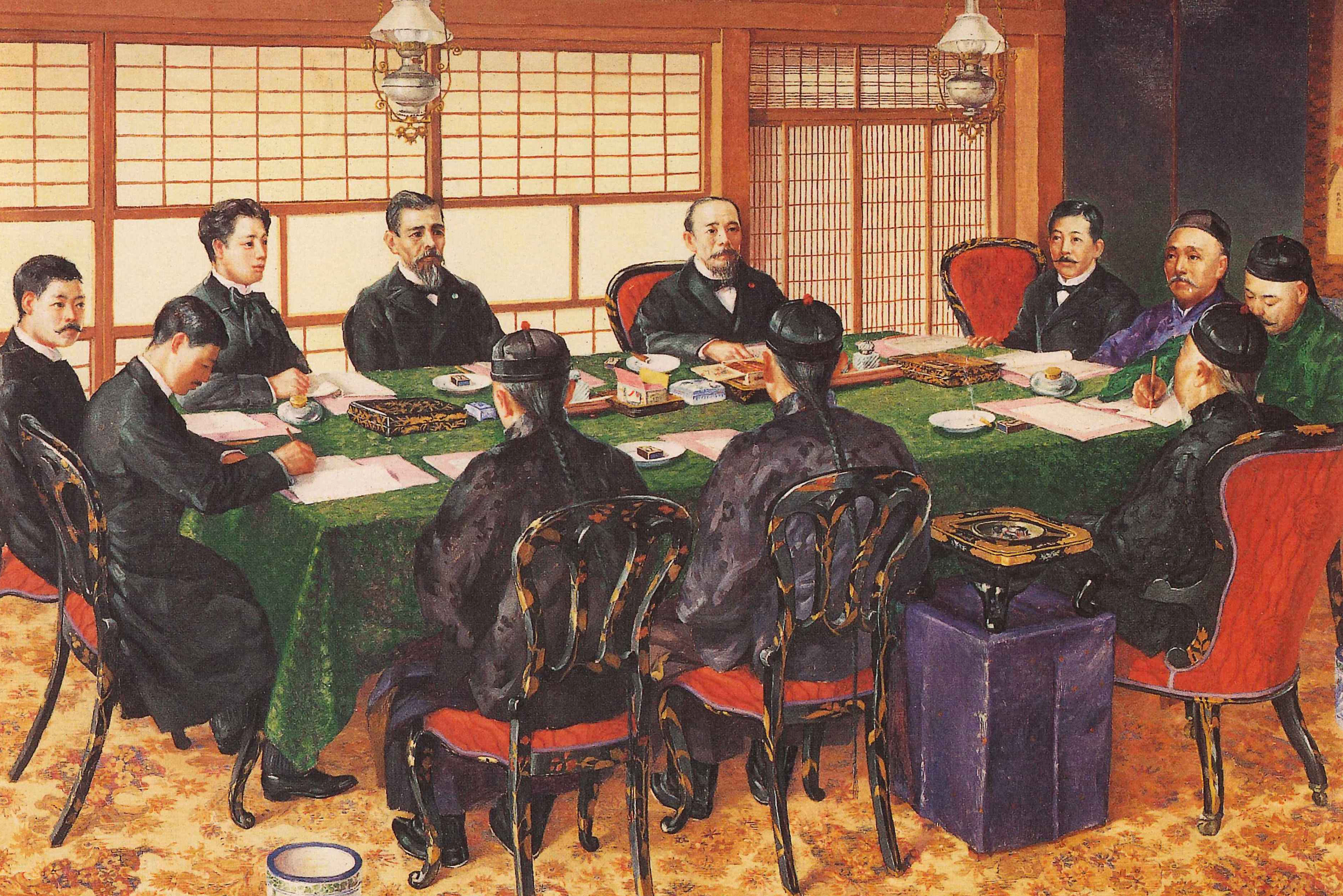
Painting of the conference at Shimonoseki, by Nagatochi Hideta (永地秀太), 1929

The treaty was drafted with John W. Foster, former American secretary of state, advising the Qing Empire. It was signed by Count Itō Hirobumi and Viscount Mutsu Munemitsu for the emperor of Japan and Li Hongzhang and Li Jingfang on behalf of the emperor of China. Before the treaty was signed, Li Hongzhang was attacked by a right-wing Japanese extremist on 24 March: he was fired at and wounded on his way back to his lodgings at Injoji temple. The public outcry aroused by the assassination attempt caused the Japanese to temper their demands and agree to a temporary armistice. The conference was temporarily adjourned and resumed on 10 April.

== Aftermath ==
=== Entry of the Western powers ===
The conditions imposed by Japan on China led to the Triple Intervention of Russia, France, and Germany, western powers all active in China, with established enclaves and ports, just six days after its signing. They demanded that Japan withdraw its claim on the Liaodong Peninsula, concerned that Lüshun, then called Port Arthur by Westerners, would fall under Japanese control. Tsar Nicholas II of Russia (an ally of France) and his imperial advisors, including Kaiser Wilhelm II of Germany, had designs on Port Arthur, which could serve as Russia's long sought-after 'ice-free' port.

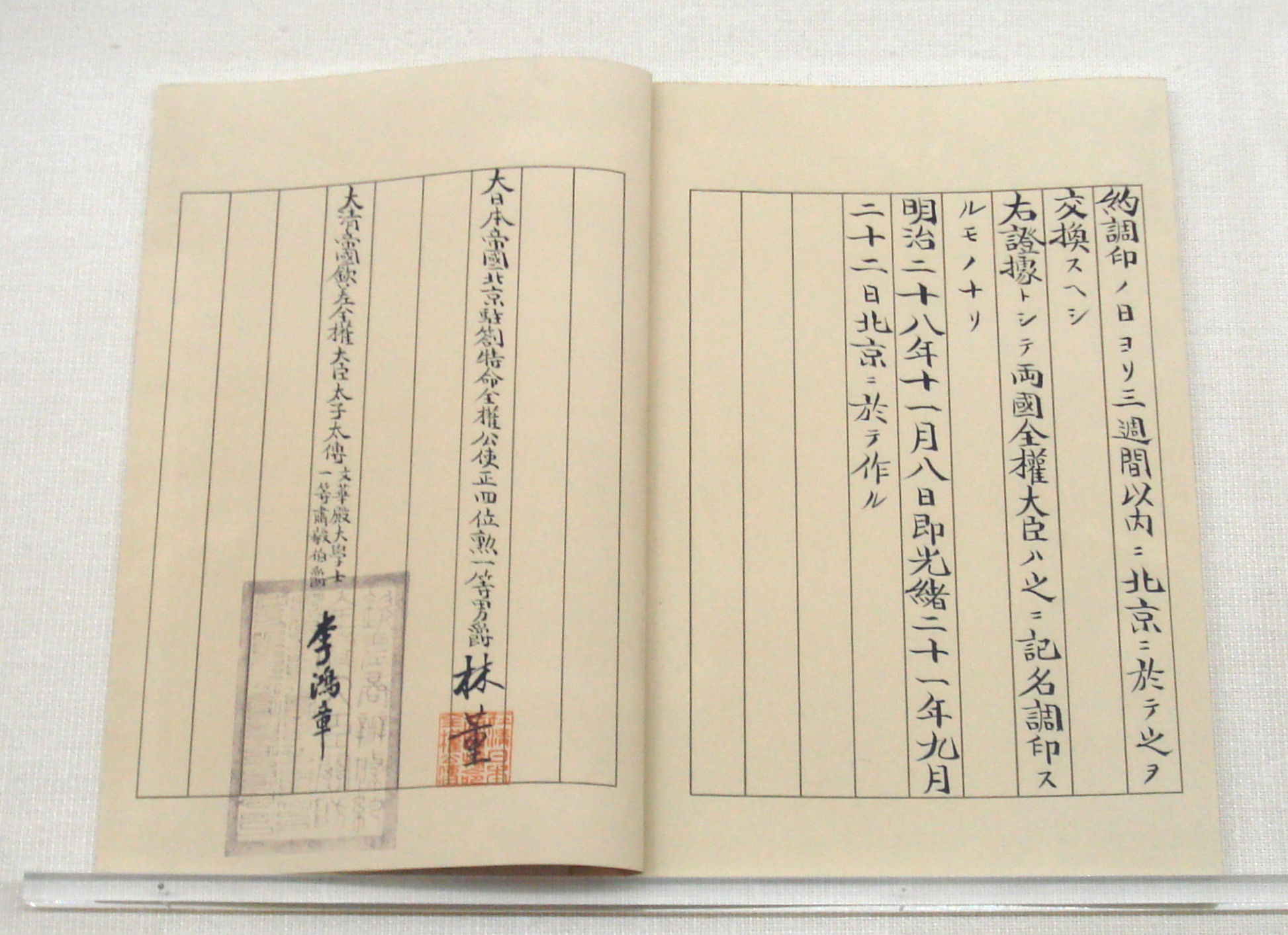
Convention of retrocession of the Liaodong peninsula, 8 November 1895

Under threat of war from three Western political powers, in November 1895, Japan — a weaker emerging nation not yet perceived as even a regional power — returned control of the territory and withdrew its de jure claim on the Liaodong Peninsula in return for an increased war indemnity from China of 30 million Taels. At that time, the European powers were not concerned with any of the other conditions, or the free hand Japan had been granted in Korea under the other terms of the Treaty of Shimonoseki. This would prove to be a mistake, as Japan would end up occupying Korea by 1905 and expand into Russia's sphere of influence with the Russo-Japanese War, and then encroach upon Germany's port in Shandong during World War I.

Within months after Japan returned the Liaodong peninsula, Russia started construction on the peninsula and a railway to Harbin from Port Arthur, despite Chinese protests. Eventually, Russia agreed to offer a diplomatic solution (See Russian Dalian) to the Chinese Empire, and agreed to a token lease of the region to save face, instead of annexing Manchuria outright, which was its effect. Within two years, Germany, France, and Great Britain had similarly taken advantage of the economic and political opportunities in the weak Chinese Empire (See Scramble for China), each taking control of significant local regions. Japan also took note of how the international community allowed the great powers to treat weaker nation states, and continued its remarkable measures to bootstrap itself into a modern industrial state and military power, with great success as it would demonstrate in the Russo-Japanese War less than a decade later.

In Taiwan, pro-Qing officials and elements of the local gentry declared a Republic of Formosa in 1895, but failed to win international recognition.

In China, the Treaty was considered a national humiliation by the bureaucracy and greatly weakened support for the Qing dynasty. The previous decades of the Self-Strengthening Movement were considered to be a failure, and support grew for more radical changes in China's political and social systems which led to Hundred Days' Reform in 1898. When the latter movement failed due to resistance from the Manchu nobility, a series of uprisings culminated in the fall of the Qing dynasty itself in 1911.

The Triple Intervention is regarded by many Japanese historians as being a crucial historic turning point in Japanese foreign affairs – from this point on, the nationalist, expansionist, and militant elements began to join ranks and steer Japan from a foreign policy based mainly on economic hegemony toward outright imperialism — a case of the coerced turning increasingly to coercion.

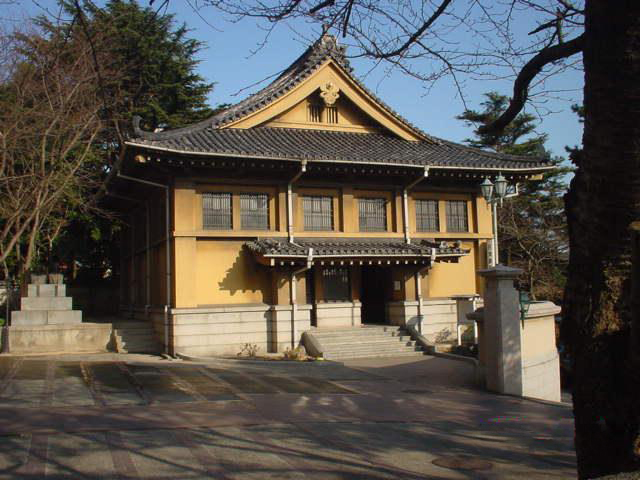
The Shunpanrō in 2004

Both the Republic of China, now controlling Taiwan, and the People's Republic of China, now controlling mainland China, consider the transfer of Taiwan to Japan to have been reversed by the Instrument of Surrender of Japan. Additionally, the Treaty of Shimonoseki is allegedly nullified by the Treaty of Taipei with the Republic of China. However, pro-independence activist Ng Chiau-tong argues that the terms subject to nullification should be limited to those not entirely fulfilled yet, to the exclusion of the cession provision. The People's Republic of China does not recognize the Treaty of Taipei.

=== Prelude to war ===
Russia wasted little time after the Triple Intervention to move men and materials down into the Liaodong to start building a railroad from both ends — Port Arthur and Harbin, as it already had railway construction in progress across northern Manchuria to shorten the rail route to Russia's principal Pacific Ocean naval base at Vladivostok, a port closed by ice four months of each year. Russia also improved the port facilities at Port Arthur and founded a commercial town nearby at Dalniy (modern-day Dalian, which now encompasses Port Arthur as its Lüshunkou District), before inking the lease of the territory.

When the de facto governance of Port Arthur and the Liaodong peninsula was granted de jure to Russia by China along with an increase in other rights she had obtained in Manchuria (especially those in Jilin and Heilongjiang provinces) the construction of the 550 mile Southern spurline of the Manchurian Railway was redoubled. Russia finally seemed to have gotten what the Russian Empire had been wanting in its quest to become a global power since the reign of Peter the Great. This ice-free natural harbor of Port Arthur/Lüshun would serve to make Russia a great sea as well as the largest land power. Russia needed this ice-free port to achieve world power status as it was tired of being blocked by the balance of power politics in Europe (The Ottoman Empire and its allies had repeatedly frustrated Russian power fruition).

However, the omission of the geopolitical reality in ignoring the free hand Japan had been granted by the Treaty (of Shimonoseki) with respect to Korea and Taiwan was short-sighted of Russia with respect to its strategic goals; to get to and maintain a strong point in Port Arthur Russia would have to dominate and control many additional hundreds of miles of Eastern Manchuria (the Fengtian province of Imperial China, modern Jilin and Heilongjiang) up to Harbin. Japan had long considered the lands paralleling the whole Korean border as part of its strategic sphere of influence. By leasing Liaodong and railway concessions, Russia crashed its Sphere of Influence squarely into Japan's.

This acted as a further goad to emerging Japanese anger at their disrespectful treatment by all the West. In the immediate fallout of the Triple Intervention, Japanese popular resentment at Russia's deviousness and the perceived weakness of its own government caving in to foreign pressure led to riots in Tokyo. The disturbance almost brought down the government, as well as a strengthening of imperial and expansionist factions within Japan. The Russian spear into the sphere also brought about the ensuing struggle with Russia for dominance in Korea and Manchuria. These events eventually led to the Russo-Japanese War of 1904–1905 by a renewed and modernized Japanese military, which led to a major defeat for Russia that marked the beginning of the end for the Romanov dynasty.

== See also ==
- Gongche Shangshu movement
- Unequal treaties
- Kwantung Leased Territory
- Chinese Eastern Railway
- South Manchuria Railway
- Yeongeunmun
- Independence Gate
- Taiwanese resistance to Japanese colonialism
