= Independence Gate =

Memorial arch in Seoul, South Korea

Independence Gate (Dongnimmun Arch)
- 독립문 (Korean)
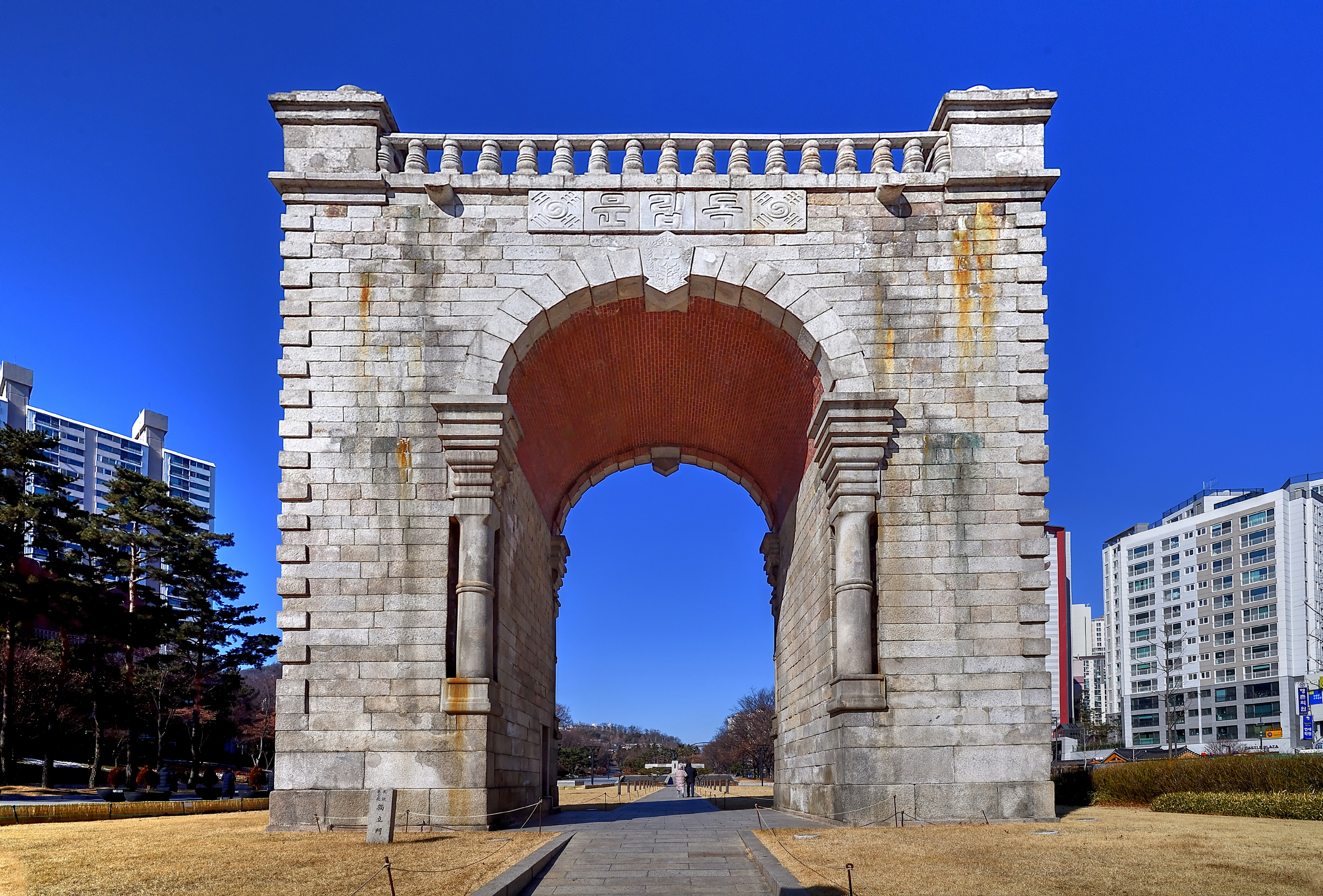
- Front side of the Independence Gate in Seoul, South Korea
- Interactive map of Independence Gate (Dongnimmun Arch)
- 37.5724101°N 126.9595249°E
- Type: Memorial Arch
- Location: 941, Hyeonjeo-dong, Seodaemun-gu, Seoul

History
- Built: January 1898

Site notes
- Area: 2,715.8 m^{2}
- Architect: Sim Ŭisŏk
- Architectural style: Triumphal arch
- Governing body: Seodaemun District
- Owner: Government of South Korea

Historic Sites of South Korea
- Official name: Dongnimmun Arch
- Designated: 1963-01-21

Korean name
- Hangul: 독립문
- Hanja: 獨立門
- RR: Dongnimmun
- MR: Tongnimmun

Independence Gate (Korean: 독립문; Hanja: 獨立門) or Dongnimmun is a memorial gate in Seoul, South Korea. It was built in January 1898. Its construction was planned by Philip Jaisohn, as a symbol of Korea's commitment to independence. It was designated as a Historic Site of South Korea in 1963, and relocated 70 metres (230 ft) northwest from the original location in 1979 for preservation.

Dongnimmun measures 14.28 meters in height and 11.48 meters in width, and is made of approximately 1,850 pieces of granite.

== History ==
=== Background ===
In early 1895, the Government of Joseon abandoned its long-standing diplomatic policy of sadae. Under sadae, Joseon was a tributary state of Qing China. To celebrate this change, the Government of Joseon demolished Yeongeunmun in February 1895, which they had built in 16th century as a symbolic gate for welcoming Chinese diplomats to the country. On April 17, 1895, the Joseon Government was formally released from China's sphere of influence with the conclusion of the Treaty of Shimonoseki between the Empire of Japan and the Qing dynasty at the end of the First Sino-Japanese War.

Philip Jaisohn proposed the building a new gate near the former site of Yeongeunmun's ruins to symbolize the country's desire for freedom. This plan was approved by King Gojong, and the gate was named "Independence Gate".

=== Plan for construction ===
To support construction of the gate, Soh created the Independence Club and published Korea's first modern newspaper named Tongnip sinmun. Regular citizens of Joseon donated to the construction of the gate via a public campaign run by the newspaper. Soh wrote the following in the English edition of that newspaper:

The croakers may croak and the pessimists may growl and the independence of Korea may be treated as a joke by those who can see nothing but the fact that His Majesty is still enjoying the hospitality of the Russian legation but they all argue from their fears and not from either present facts or future probabilities. Today we rejoice in the fact that the King has decided to erect upon the ruins of the arch outside the West Gate, a new one to be entitled Independence Arch. 독립문. We do not know as its inscription will be written in on-mun but we wish it might. For centuries the arch stood there as a constant insult to the autonomy of Korea, an autonomy which China always hastened to assert when called upon to stand responsible for any tremble in the peninsula but which site always denied when it was safe to do so. She denied it once too many times and now her "suzerainty" is where the old arch is, namely op-so. And now an arch is to be raised on the same spot to stand forever as a negation of Manchu dominance to show that Korea is once and for all cut off from the blighting influence of Chinese patronage; cut off, we hope, also from the system of fraud, corruption and trickery which today makes that most populous empire the laughing-stock of the world. This arch means independence not from China alone but from Japan from Russia and from all European powers.

— Philip Jaisohn, Editorial, The Independent, June 20, 1895

=== Construction ===
The design of Independence Gate was inspired by the design of the Arc de Triomphe in Paris. An unknown Swiss architect working for the German legation in Joseon created the blueprint for its construction. Its construction began in 1896, and finished in January 1898. The construction process was overseen by Korean engineer named Sim Ui-seok.

=== Subsequent history ===
The Government of South Korea designated it as a historic site of South Korea in 1963. The gate was initially located north of the plinths of Yeongeunmun Gate, but was relocated 70 meters northwest from its original location due to the construction of Seongsan Road and its overpass. It is now located in Seodaemun Independence Park, easily accessible from Exit 4 or 5 of Dongnimmun Station on Seoul Subway Line 3.

== Gallery ==
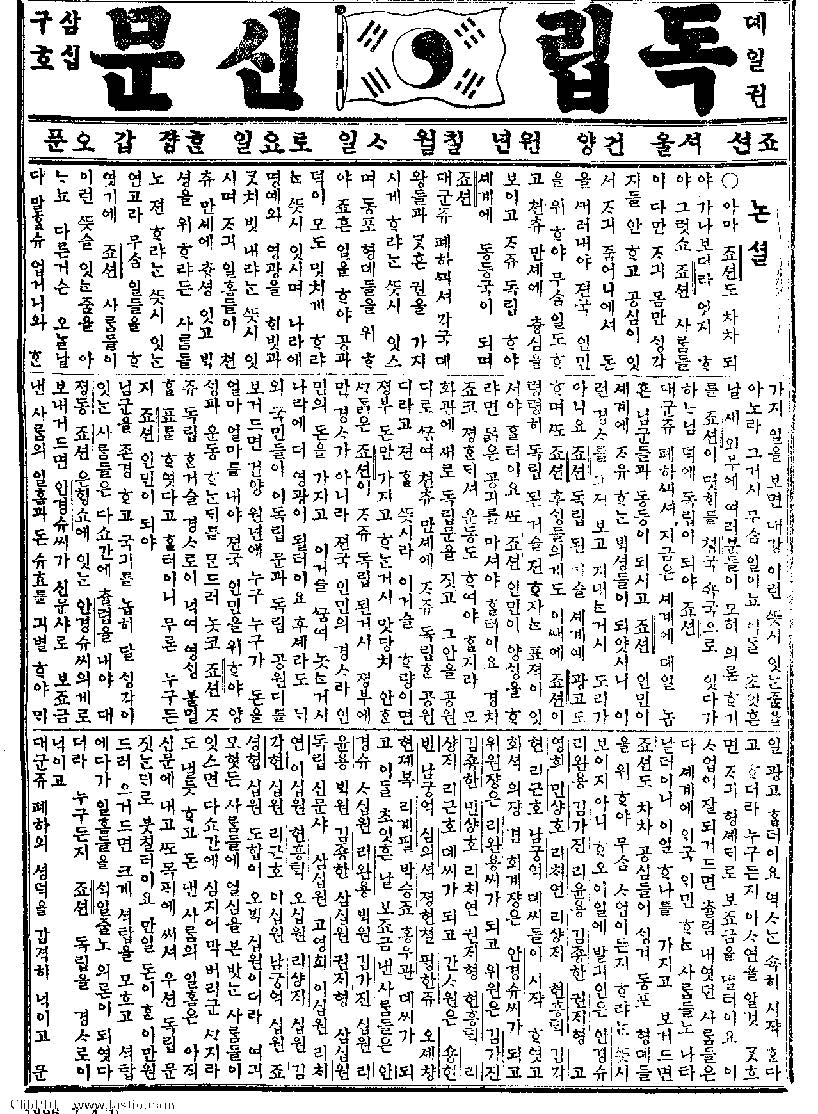
An editorial in Tongnip sinmun promoting fundraising for construction of Dongnimmun, July 4, 1896

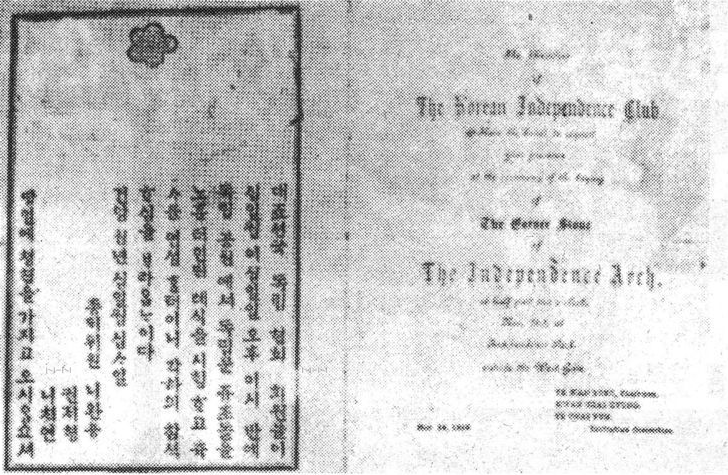
An image of the invitation to the groundbreaking ceremony for the Independence Gate on November 21, 1896

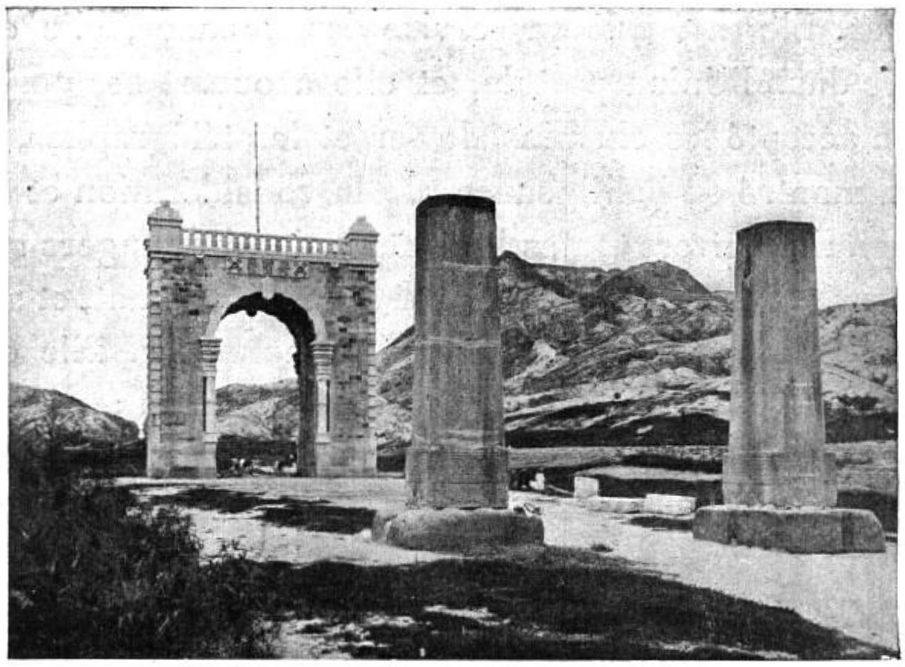
Scene of Dongnimmun looking down the Plinths of Yeongeunmun Gate in 1904

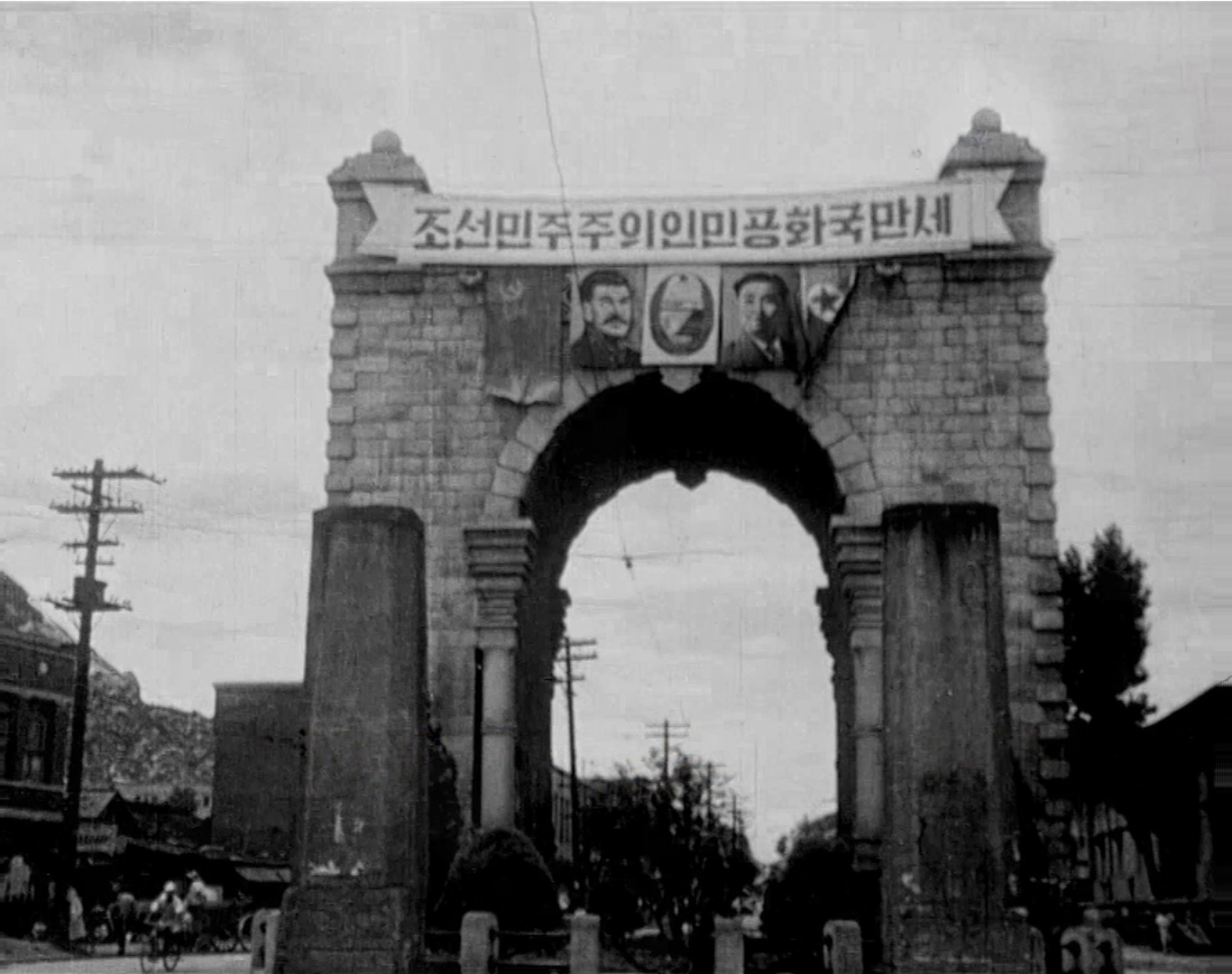
View of Dongnimmun after the First Battle of Seoul, 1950. It was decorated with the emblem of North Korea, the portraits of Joseph Stalin and Kim Il Sung, and the flags of Soviet Union and North Korea. The motto reads "Long Live the Democratic People's Republic of Korea".

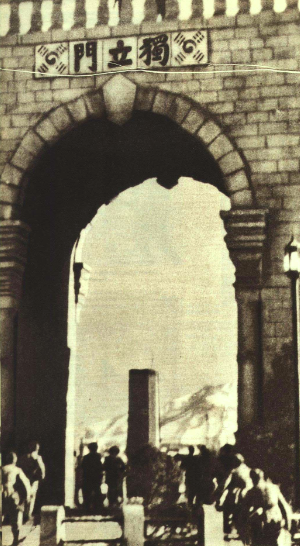
The Chinese People's Volunteer Army storming through Dongnimmun during the Third Battle of Seoul, January 1951

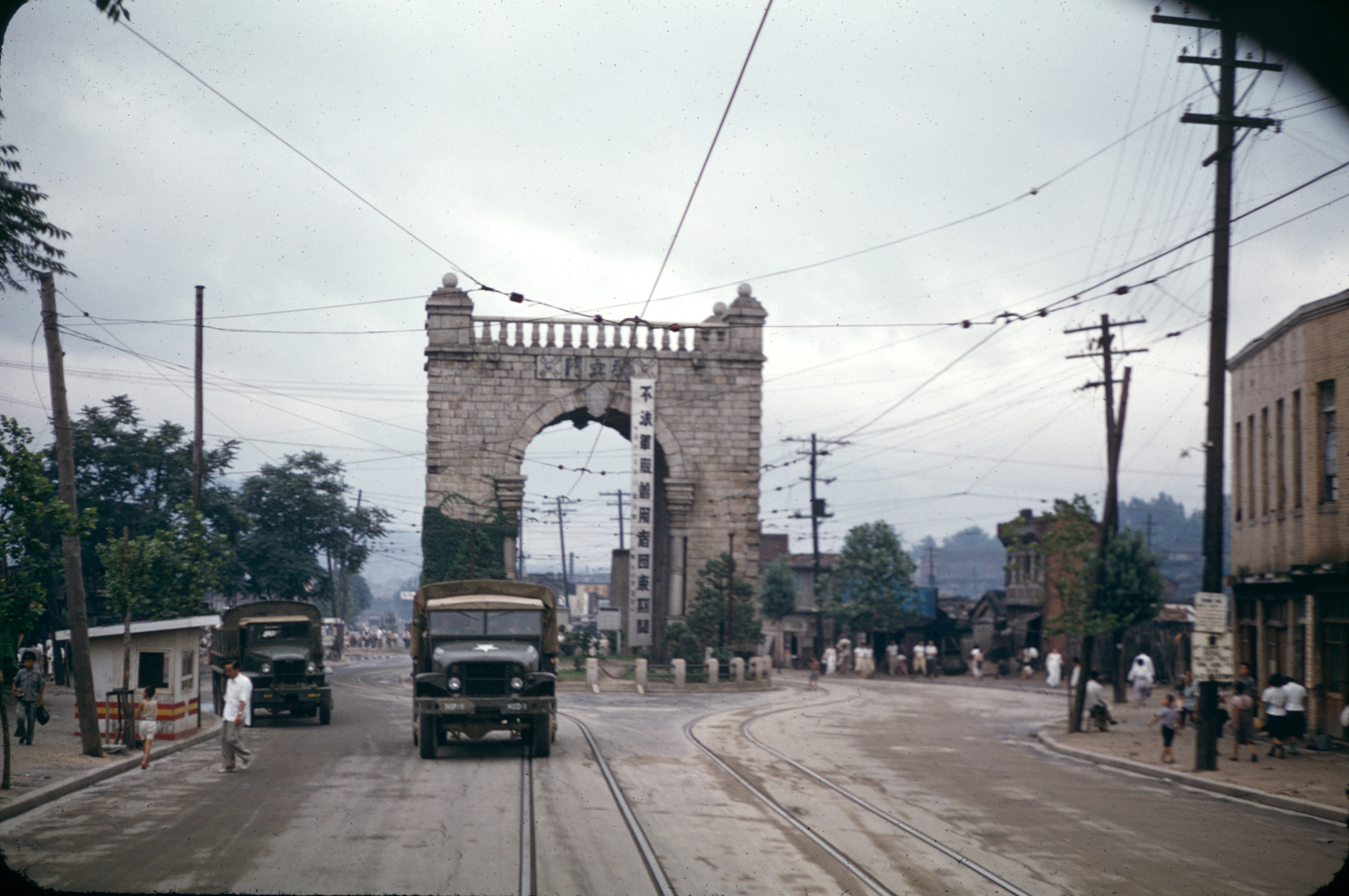
View of Dongnimmun from northern side in 1955 before relocation

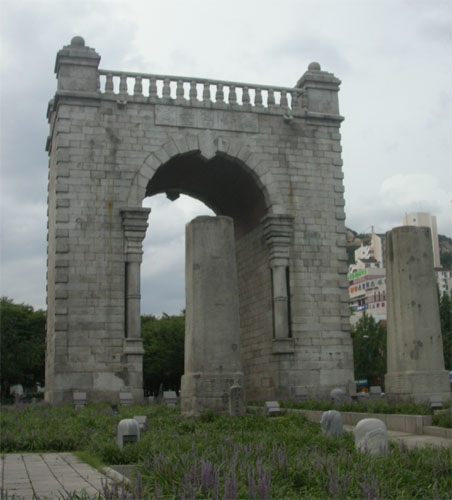
Dongnimmun and Plinths of Yeongeunmun Gate, Seoul after relocation

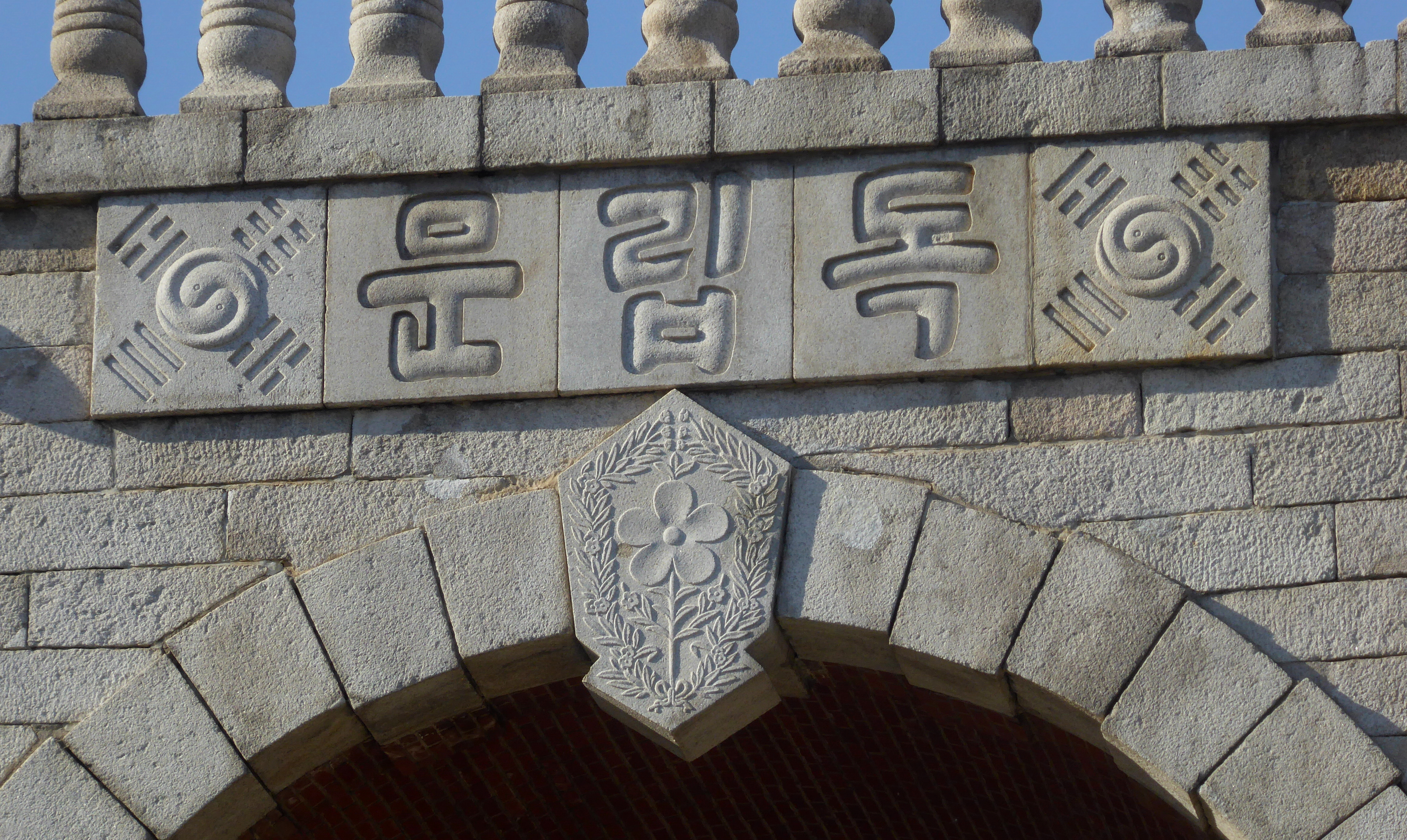
Letters of '독립문' and Taegukgi is carved on arch via Vertical writing. Below sign of flower is symbol of House of Yi

== See also ==
- Yeongeunmun Gate
- Plinths of Yeongeunmun Gate, Seoul
- Independence Club
- Tongnip sinmun
- Seodaemun Independence Park
- Dongnimmun station
