= Yŏngŭnmun =

1537–1895 gate in Seoul, Korea

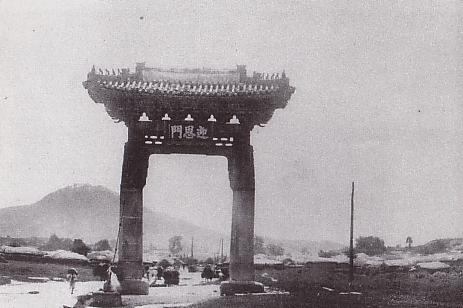
- Picture of Yŏngŭnmun before demolition
- Interactive map of the Yŏngŭnmun area
- Former names: Yeongjomun
- Alternative names: Yeonjumun, Yeoneunmun

General information
- Status: Demolished
- Type: Gate
- Location: South Korea
- Coordinates: 37.57220°N 126.96030°E
- Completed: 1537 (renamed in 1539)
- Demolished: 1895

Korean name
- Hangul: 영은문
- Hanja: 迎恩門
- RR: Yeongeunmun
- MR: Yŏngŭnmun

Yŏngŭnmun (Korean: 영은문; Hanja: 迎恩門) or Yeongeunmun Gate was a Joseon-era gate near present day Seoul, South Korea. Since it was a symbol of China's diplomatic influence on Joseon, the Enlightenment Party of the Joseon government intentionally demolished it in February 1895, seeking complete political independence of Joseon from China.

== History ==
For a long time, the Joseon Dynasty continued its diplomatic policy with the Late Chinese Empires in an arrangement respecting the political influence of China. This was called sadae (사대; 事大), which translates literally as "serving" (사; 事; Sa) the "greater" (대; 大; Dae) country (usually translated into suzerainty, flunkeyism or as "serving the Great"). This mode of diplomatic relationship was later enforced by the Qing dynasty, through the Qing invasion of Joseon in 1636.

Located at the current northwestern part of Seoul, South Korea, the Yŏngŭnmun was one of Joseon's material symbols of sadae. In 1407, King Taejong of Joseon built a special state guest house for Chinese envoys to rest en route from China to Joseon, outside of Seoul's west gate. It was named "Mohwa Pavilion" (모화루; 慕華樓; Mohwaru), literally in meaning of "Pavilion" (루; 樓; Ru) "admiring" (모; 慕; Mo) "Chinese civilization" (화; 華; Hwa). Its name was later changed to "Mohwa Guesthouse" (모화관; 慕華館; Mohwagwuan) in 1430 by King Sejong the Great of Joseon, simply changing meaning of "Pavilion" to "Guesthouse" (관; 館; Gwan).

King Sejong also built a Hongsalmun (홍살문; 紅살門) near the Mohwa Guesthouse. This guesthouse had an arrow-shaped decoration on its top. It was then reconstructed into a new gate in 1537, and became notorious after it was officially named as Yeongjomun (영조문; 迎詔門) by Jungjong of Joseon, literally in meaning of "Gate" (문; 門; Mun) "welcoming" (영; 迎; Yeong) "messages from China" (조; 詔; Jo). Yet, Chinese diplomats insisted they were not just delivering messages, so the name of gate was changed to Yŏngŭnmun in 1539, meaning "Gate welcoming grace from China". Though its official name was confirmed as Yŏngŭnmun from that time, it was also called as Yeonjumun or Yeoneunmun. The structure had a hip roof and columns over two long plinths.

== Demolition ==
In the late 19th century, The Enlightenment Party of Joseon tried to modernize the country. One of its political goals was to turn Joseon into a completely independent state. So in February 1895, during a period called the Kabo Reform, the Enlightenment Party demolished Yŏngŭnmun to show Joseon's enthusiasm of independence around the world. They thought the Mohwa Guesthouse could be reformed into another use, yet Yŏngŭnmun had to be demolished. Meanwhile, Soh Jaipil, a Korean-American political activist supporting independence of Joseon, planned the building of a new gate near the ruins of a demolished Yŏngŭnmun to symbolize the independent status of Joseon and his plan eventually obtained support from King Gojong. After Joseon was reestablished into the Korean Empire in 1897, there was a new gate built by Soh Jaipil, named as 'Independence Gate', at the site overlooking the ruins of the demolished Yŏngŭnmun. Also, the Mohwa Guesthouse was reformed into an "Independence Hall" (독립관; 獨立館; Dongnipgwan). For this long historical background, in 1963, South Korean government has designated the ruins of the demolished Yŏngŭnmun as a Historic Site of South Korea, and relocated them to another place for preservation in 1979.

== Gallery ==
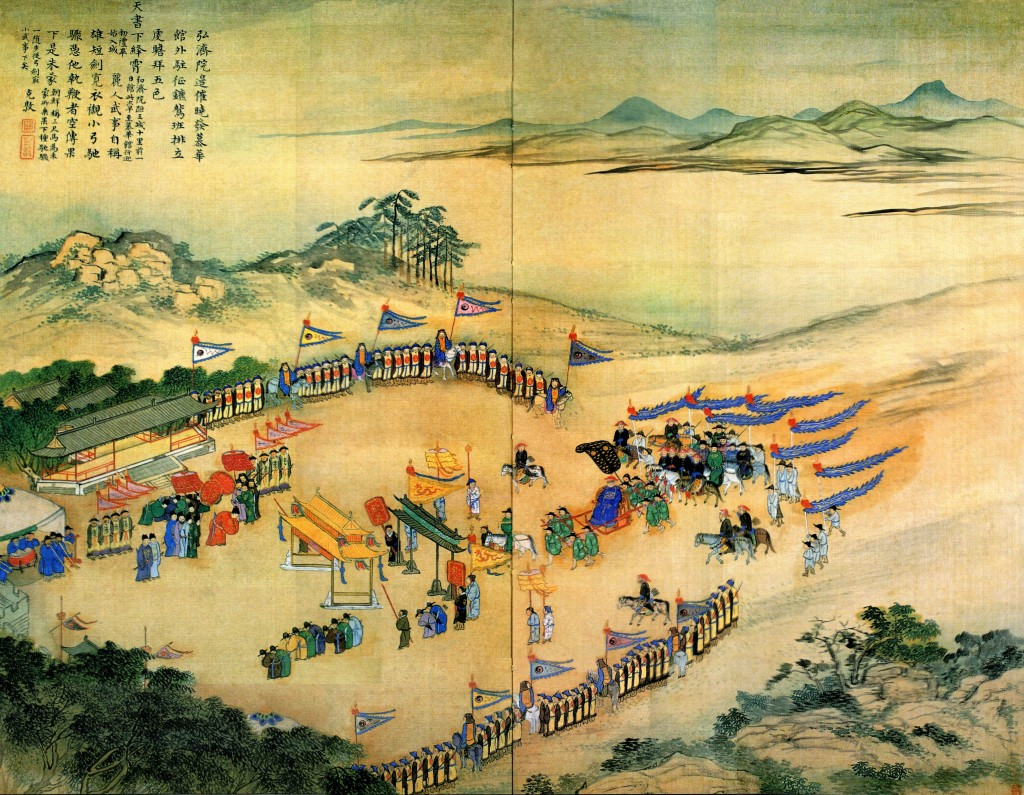
Picture describing Qing envoy greeted by the King of Joseon

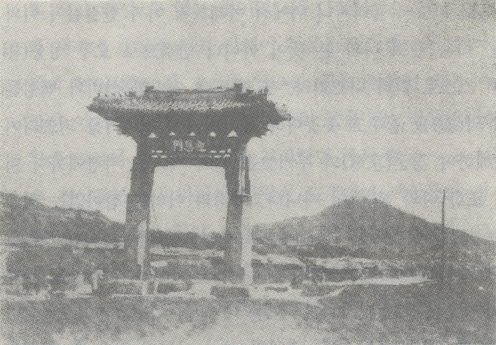
Picture of Yŏngŭnmun from other side

== See also ==
- Qing invasion of Joseon
- Historic Sites of South Korea
