= North Chosen Line =

1924–1933 railway line in Korea

Overview
- Native name: 북선선 (北鮮線)
- Status: Merged (see article)
- Owner: Domun Railway (1924–1929); Chosen Government Railway (1929–1933); South Manchuria Railway (1933–1945)
- Termini: Sangsambong; Unggi

Service
- Type: Heavy rail, Passenger & freight rail Regional rail

History
- Opened: 1924−1933

Technical
- Line length: 194.5 km (120.9 mi)
- Track gauge: 1,435 mm (4 ft 8 1/2 in) standard gauge

The North Chosen Line – specifically, the North Chosen West Line (北鮮西部線, Hokusen Seibu-sen; 북선서부선, Bukseon Seobu-seon) and the North Chosen East Line (北鮮東部線, Hokusen Tōbu-sen; 북선동부선, Bukseon Dongbu-seon) – was a railway line of the South Manchuria Railway in Japanese-occupied Korea from 1933 to 1945. Following Japan's defeat in the Pacific War and the subsequent partition of Korea, the line, being located entirely in the North, was taken over by the Korean State Railway as part of the Hambuk Line.

== History ==
In order to create the shortest possible route from Japan to eastern Manchuria, the Chosen Government Railway (Sentetsu) began construction of a line from Unggi (now Sŏnbong) to Donggwanjin via Namyang in 1929. Named the East Domun Line, it reached Donggwanjin on 1 August 1933. There, it connected with the West Domun Line that Sentetsu had nationalised from the Domun Railway in 1929, and the entire Hoeryeong−Unggi line was then redesignated as the Domun Line, and Donggwanjin Station was renamed to Donggwan Station.

At the same time as the Namyang–Tonggwan section of the mainline was opened, a bridge was built over the Tumen River at Namyang, along with a line to Tumen, Manchukuo. This line, called the Namyang Gukgyeong Line (Namyang Border Line), connected Sentetsu to the Manchukuo National Railway's new Jingtu Line from Xinjing (now Changchun), capital of Manchukuo, to Tumen, that was also opened in 1933. This new route, using the northern port of Unggi, made the distance from Japan to Harbin even shorter than via Cheongjin. After the opening of the Manchukuo National's Tujia Line (图佳铁路) from Tumen to Jiamusi, also in 1933, an international passenger service from Gyeongseong to Botankou (Mudanjiang) via the Hamgyeong, Cheongjin, and Domun Lines, was inaugurated.

Just a few months after completion of the line from Unggi, on 1 October 1933 the management of Sentetsu's entire route from Cheongjin to Unggi was transferred to the South Manchuria Railway (Mantetsu). On 1 November 1934, Mantetsu rearranged these lines, merging the Namyang Border Line with the Unggi−Namyang section of the Domun Line to create the North Chosen East Line (Unggi–Namyang–Tumen), with the Namyang–Sangsambong section becoming the North Chosen West Line. In 1936, the "Asahi" express train between Xinjing and Najin was inaugurated, to connect to the ferry from Najin to Japan.

In addition to the connections to the Manchukuo National Railway at Sangsambong and Namyang, Mantetsu had a third connection to Manchukuo, via the privately owned East Manchuria Railway's bridge across the Tumen River at Hunyung.

Section	Length	Opened	Original Owner	Line to 1928	1929	1933	1934 – 1945
Sangsambong−Jongseong	9.1 km	1 December 1922	Domun Railway	Domun Railway	West Tomun Line (Sentetsu)	Domun Line (Sentetsu)	North Chosen West Line (Mantetsu)
Jongseon−Donggwanjin	8.2 km	1 November 1924	Domun Railway	Domun Railway	West Tomun Line (Sentetsu)	Domun Line (Sentetsu)	North Chosen West Line (Mantetsu)
Donggwanjin−Namyang	18.7 km	1 August 1933	Sentetsu	-	East Tomun Line	Domun Line (Sentetsu)	North Chosen West Line (Mantetsu)
Namyang−Tumen	3.3 km	1 August 1933	Sentetsu	-	-	Namyang Gukgyeong Line (Sentetsu)	North Chosen East Line (Mantetsu)
Namyang−Pungri	3.9 km	1 December 1932	Sentetsu	-	East Tomun Line (Sentetsu 1932–1933)	Domun Line (Sentetsu)	North Chosen East Line (Mantetsu)
Pungri−Unseong	5.5 km	1 November 1932	Sentetsu	-	East Tomun Line (Sentetsu 1932–1933)	Domun Line (Sentetsu)	North Chosen East Line (Mantetsu)
Unseong−Hunyung	24.7 km	20 October 1931	Sentetsu	-	East Tomun Line (Sentetsu 1931–1933)	Domun Line (Sentetsu)	North Chosen East Line (Mantetsu)
Hunyung−Sinasan	39.8 km	1 October 1930	Sentetsu	-	East Tomun Line (Sentetsu 1930–1933)	Domun Line (Sentetsu)	North Chosen East Line (Mantetsu)
Sinasan−Unggi	65.0 km	16 November 1929	Sentetsu	-	East Tomun Line (Sentetsu 1929–1933)	Domun Line (Sentetsu)	North Chosen East Line (Mantetsu)

Service on the line was suspended after the Soviet invasion at the end of the Pacific War. The damage sustained by the line during the war - including the destruction of the Tumen River bridges at both Hunyung and Sambong - was slow to be repaired due to strained relations between the Soviets and the Korean People's Committees; those two bridges have not been repaired to the present day. After the partition of Korea, the Provisional People’s Committee for North Korea nationalised all railways in the Soviet zone of occupation on 10 August 1946, and following the establishment of the DPRK, the Korean State Railway was created in 1948. After the end of the Korean War, the North Korean railway system was restructured, which included the rearrangement of several rail lines. This included the merging of the North Chosen West Line, the Namyang−Unggi section of the North Chosen East Line, and the Ungna Line to create the present-day Cheongjin−Namyang−Rajin Hambuk Line. The Namyang−Tumen cross-border section of the North Chosen East Line was split off to create the Namyang Gukgyeong Line.

== Route ==
North Chosen West Line - stations as of 1945
Distance		Station name					
Total; km	S2S; km	Transcribed, Korean	Transcribed, Japanese	Hunminjeongeum	Hanja/Kanji	Opening date Original owner	Connections
0.0	0.0	Sangsambong; Sambong (after 1933)	Jōsanhō; Sanhō	상삼봉 삼봉	上三峰 三峰	5 January 1920; Domun Railway	Sentetsu Hamgyeong Line; Manchukuo National Railway Chaokai Line
3.2	3.2	Hasambong	Kasanhō	하삼봉	下三峰	1 December 1922; Domun Railway	Closed 1933
9.1	5.9	Jongseong	Shōjō	종성	鍾城	1 December 1922; Domun Railway	Mantetsu Tongpo Line
14.3	5.3	Soam	Shōgan	소암	小岩	1 November 1924; Domun Railway	Closed 1944
17.3	3.0	Donggwan	Tōken	동관	東關	1 November 1924; Domun Railway	Mantetsu Songpyeong Line
23.2	4.9	Sugupo	Suigōho	수구포	水口浦	1 August 1933; Sentetsu	
29.9	6.7	Gangyang	Kōyō	강양	江陽	1 August 1933; Sentetsu	
36.0	6.1	Namyang	Nan'yō	남양	南陽	1 December 1932; Sentetsu	Mantetsu North Chosen East Line

North Chosen East Line - stations as of 1945
Distance		Station name					
Total; km	S2S; km	Transcribed, Korean	Transcribed, Japanese	Hunminjeongeum	Hanja/Kanji	Opening date Original owner	Connections
0.0	0.0	Tumen, Manchukuo	Tomon	圖們	圖們	1933; Manchukuo National Railway	Manchukuo National Rly Jingtu Line
3.3	3.3	Namyang	Nan'yō	남양	南陽	1 December 1932; Sentetsu	Mantetsu North Chosen West Line
7.2	3.9	Pungni	Hōri	풍리	豊利	1 December 1932; Sentetsu	
13.3	6.1	Seseon	Seizen	세선	世仙	1 November 1932; Sentetsu	
17.8	4.5	Unseong	Onjō	운성	穏城	20 October 1931; Sentetsu	
24.3	6.5	Pung'in	Hōjin	풍인	豊仁	20 October 1931; Sentetsu	
33.6	9.3	Hwangpa	Kōha	황파	黄坡	20 October 1931; Sentetsu	
43.2	9.6	Hunyung	Kunjū	룬융	訓戎	1 October 1930; Sentetsu	East Manchuria Railway
48.6	5.4	Hamyeon	Kamen	하면	下面	1 October 1930; Sentetsu	
52.9	4.3	Gyeongwon	Keigen	경원	慶源	1 October 1930; Sentetsu	
60.2	7.3	Nongpo	Nōho	농포	農圃	1 October 1930; Sentetsu	
64.0	3.8	Seungnyang	Shōryō	승량	承良	1 October 1930; Sentetsu	
72.4	8.4	Singeon	Shinkan	신건	新乾	1 October 1930; Sentetsu	
83.0	10.6	Sinasan	Shin'azan	신아산	新阿山	16 November 1929; Sentetsu	
90.3	7.3	Songhak	Shōkaku	송학	松鶴	16 November 1929; Sentetsu	
96.2	5.9	Aoji	Aguji	아오지	阿吾地	16 November 1929; Sentetsu	Chosen Coal Industry Railway Ao Line
104.9	8.7	Cheonghak	Seikaku	청학	青鶴	16 November 1929; Sentetsu	
114.6	9.7	Sahoe	Seikai	사회	四会	16 November 1929; Sentetsu	
127.7	13.1	Guryongpyeong	Kyūryōhei	구룡평	九龍坪	16 November 1929; Sentetsu	
135.7	8.0	Ungsang	Yūshō	웅상	雄尚	16 November 1929; Sentetsu	
146.2	10.5	Dongunggi	Higashi-Yūki	동웅기	東雄基	16 November 1929; Sentetsu	
158.5	12.3	Unggi	Yūki	웅기	雄基	16 November 1929; Sentetsu	Mantetsu Ungna Line
