= Ungna Line =

1935–1945 railway line in Korea

Overview
- Native name: 웅라선 (雄羅線)
- Status: Merged (see article)
- Owner: South Manchuria Railway (1935–1945); Korean State Railway (since 1945)
- Termini: Unggi; Rason

Service
- Type: Heavy rail, Passenger & freight rail Regional rail

History
- Opened: 1935

Technical
- Line length: 15.2 km (9.4 mi)
- Track gauge: 1,435 mm (4 ft 8 1/2 in) standard gauge

- Ungna Line
- Hangul: 웅라선
- Hanja: 雄羅線
- RR: Ungnaseon
- MR: Ungnasŏn

The Ungna Line (Korean: 웅라선) was a railway line of the South Manchuria Railway (Mantetsu), connecting Unggi with the important port city of Rason.

== History ==
Seeking to create a shorter route from Japan to Xinjing and Harbin in Manchukuo, the South Manchuria Railway took over control of the Chosen Government Railway's Sangsambong–Unggi Domun Line in October 1933, creating the North Chosen Line. Although Unggi was a satisfactory port, a larger one was built at Najin, so Mantetsu built a new line to connect the North Chosen Line to the new port facilities. This line, the 15.2 km (9.4 mi) Ungna Line (Yūra Line in Japanese), was opened on 1 November 1935. At the same time, the Najinbudu Line was opened to connect the main railyard at Najin to the wharves at the port.

Following the end of the Pacific War and the partition of Korea, the Ungna Line was taken over by the Korean State Railway, which eventually merged it with several other lines to create the current Hambuk Line between Najin and Cheongjin.

== Route ==
Stations as of 1945
Distance		Station name					
Total; km	S2S; km	Transcribed, Korean	Transcribed, Japanese	Hunminjeongeum	Hanja/Kanji	Opening date Original owner	Connections
0.0	0.0	Unggi	Yūki	웅기	雄基	16 November 1929; Sentetsu	Mantetsu North Chosen Line
		Baekhwa	Hyakuka	백화	百花	1 November 1935	
6.2		Gwan'gok	Kankoku	관곡	寛谷	1 November 1935	
15.2	9.0	Najin	Rashin	나진	羅津	1 November 1935	Mantetsu Najinbudu Line
3.0	3.0 (from Najin)	Namnajin	Minami-Rashin	남나진	南羅津	1 November 1935	
