= Namyang Workers' District =

Namyang Workers' District 남양로동자구
- Workers' District
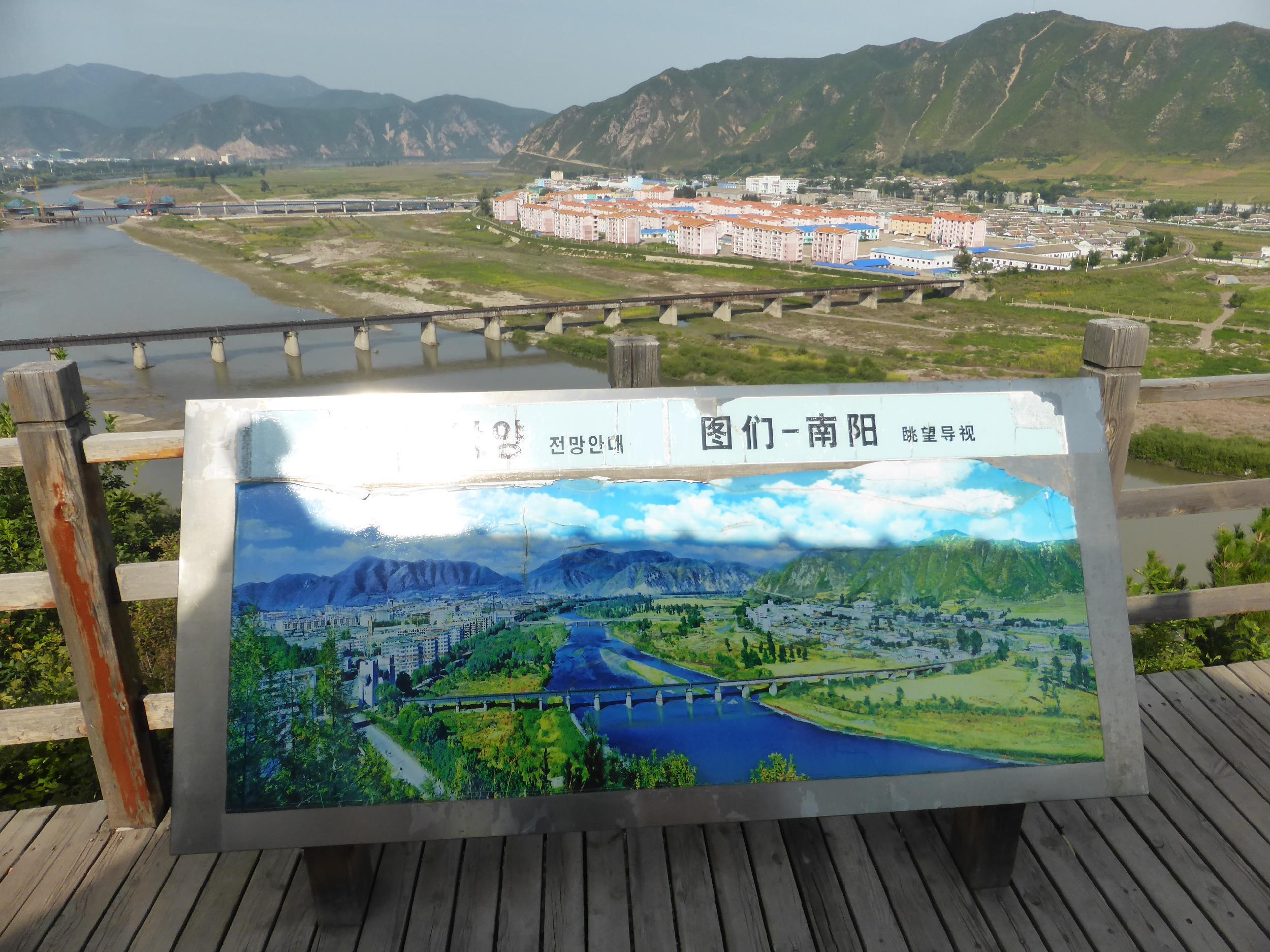
- View on the Namyang Workers' District from the Chinese side of the river (2018)

- Location within North Korea
- Coordinates: 42°57′06″N 129°51′33″E
- Country: North Korea
- Elevation: 40 m (130 ft)

Population
  - Total: 65,956 (within 5 km radius)
- Phone prefix: +850

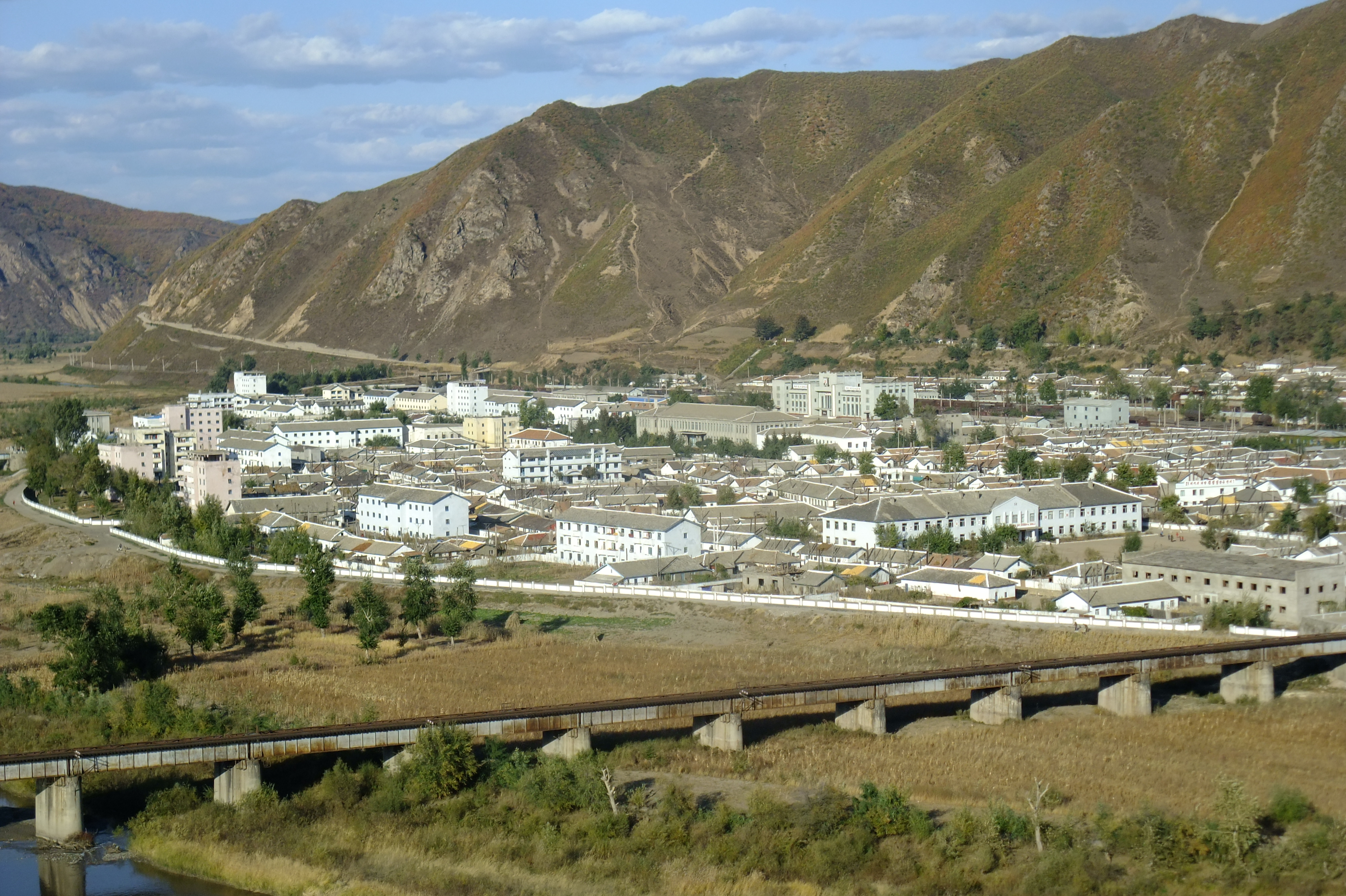
2011 view of the Namyang Workers' District from the Chinese side of the river.

Namyang Workers' District (남양로동자구) is a town in Onsong, North Hamgyong, North Korea. It lies on the Tumen River and opposite to the city of Tumen that stands in the Chinese bank of the river.

== Transportation ==
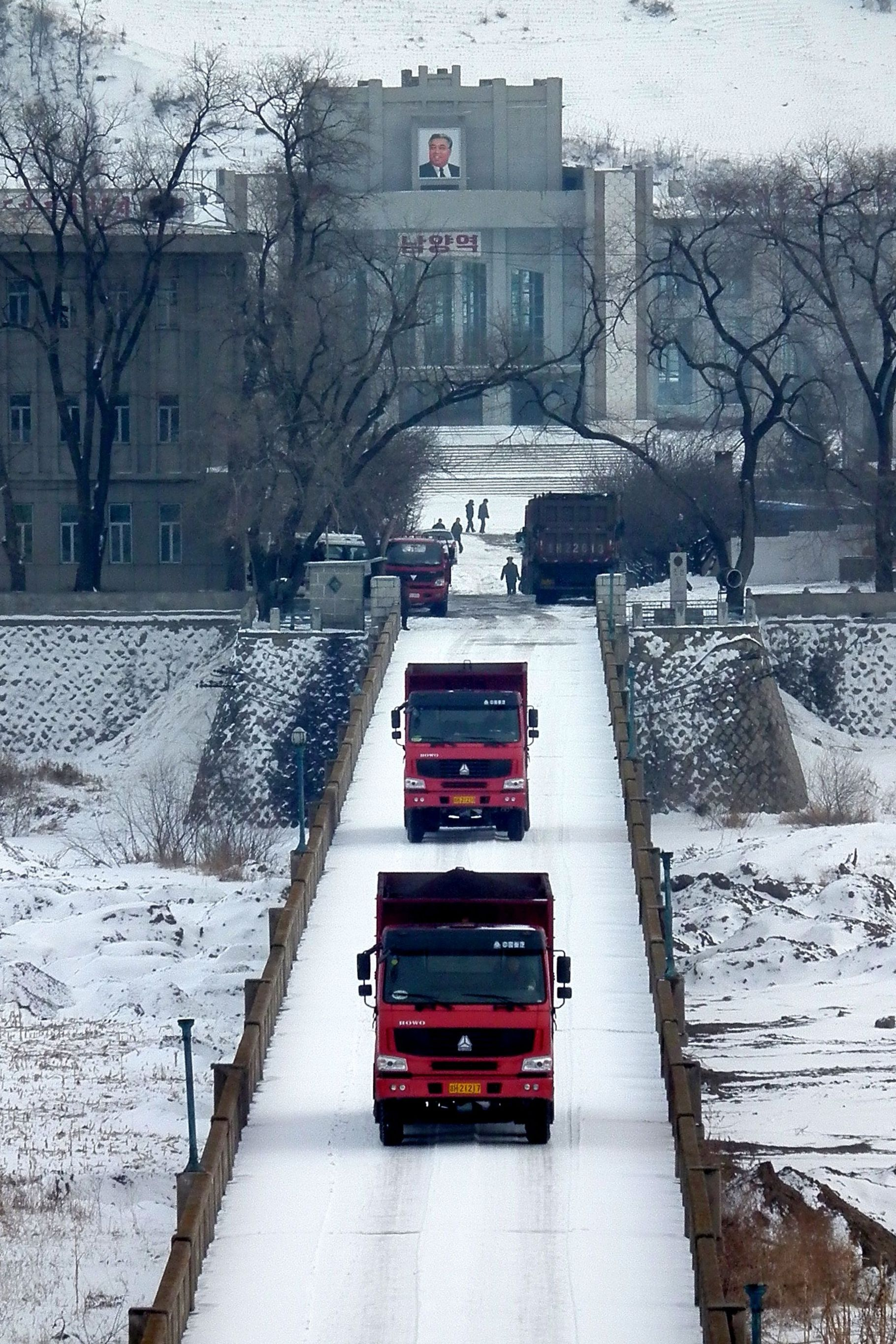
Tumen bridge in winter

Most of the movement in the town is made by trucks and bicycles. The town is also served by Namyang Station on the Hambuk Line of the Korean State Railway.

Three bridges connect Namyang to Tumen across the river. In the north there is a modern four-lane vehicle bridge, with a smaller bridge for vehicles and pedestrians running parallel. An older, single-track railway bridge lies farther south and carries the Namyanggukkyong Line across the river.

== See also ==
- Tumen Border Bridge

== Sources ==
- "Namyang". TRIP-CITY.COM. Archived from the original on 2007-10-09.
