= South Manchuria Railway =

1906–1945 Japanese company in China

South Manchuria Railway Company, Ltd.
- Native name: 南満州鉄道株式会社
- Romanized name: Minami-Manshū Tetsudō kabushiki gaisha
- Type: Public KK
- Founded: 26 November 1906
- Founder: Government of Japan
- Defunct: after the Soviet invasion of Manchuria in August 1945
- Headquarters: Dairen, SMR Railway Zone, Xinjing, Manchukuo (after 1931)
- Key people: Gotō Shinpei (first president)
- Owner: Government of Japan (50%)

South Manchuria Railway

Chinese name
- Traditional Chinese: 南滿洲鐵道
- Simplified Chinese: 南满洲铁道
Transcriptions
Standard Mandarin
- Hanyu Pinyin: Nánmǎnzhōu Tiědào

Japanese name
- Kanji: 南満州鉄道
- Hiragana: みなみまんしゅうてつどう
- Katakana: ミナミマンシュウテツドウ
Transcriptions
- Romanization: Minamimanshū Tetsudō

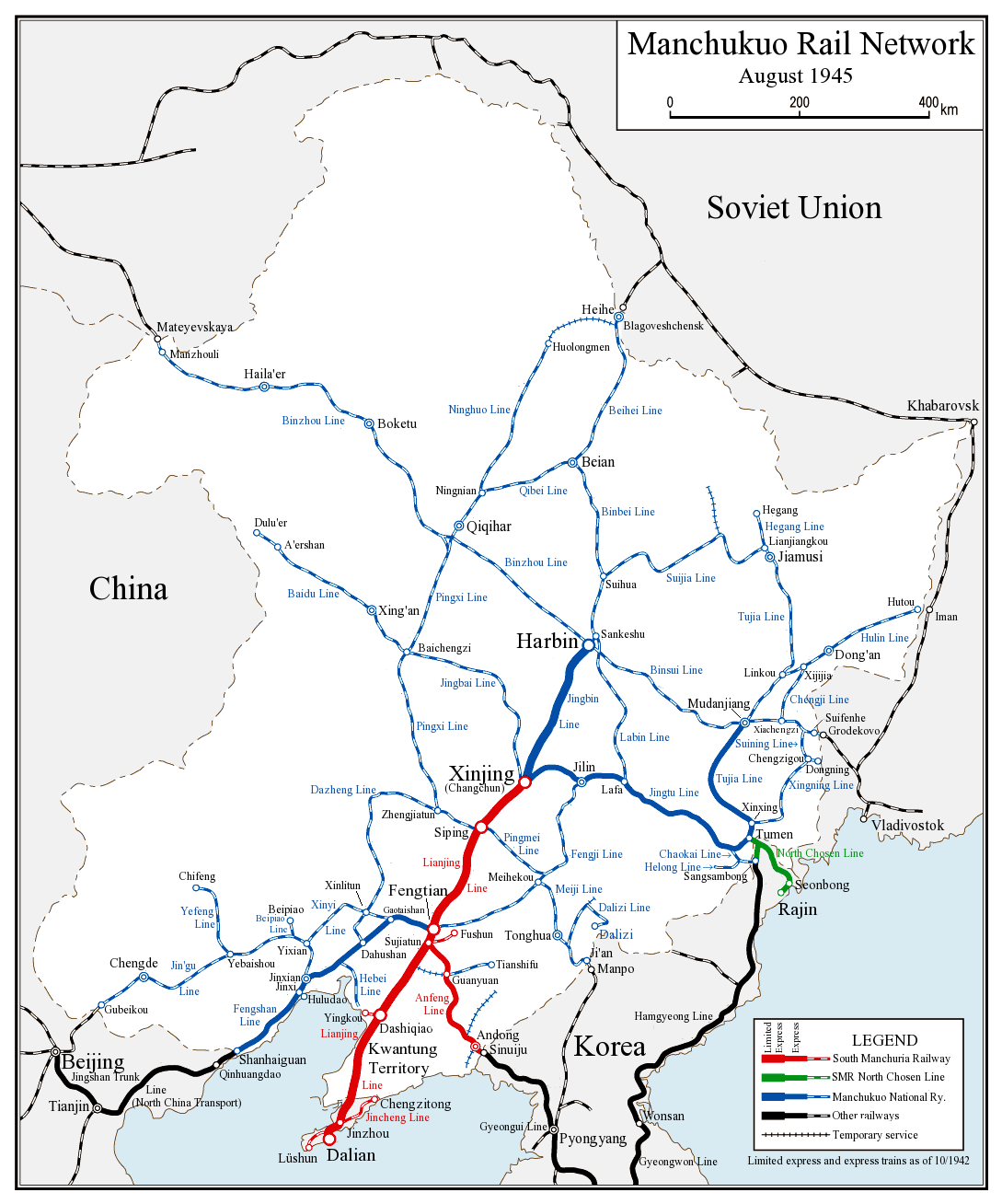
Rail network of Manchukuo in 1945

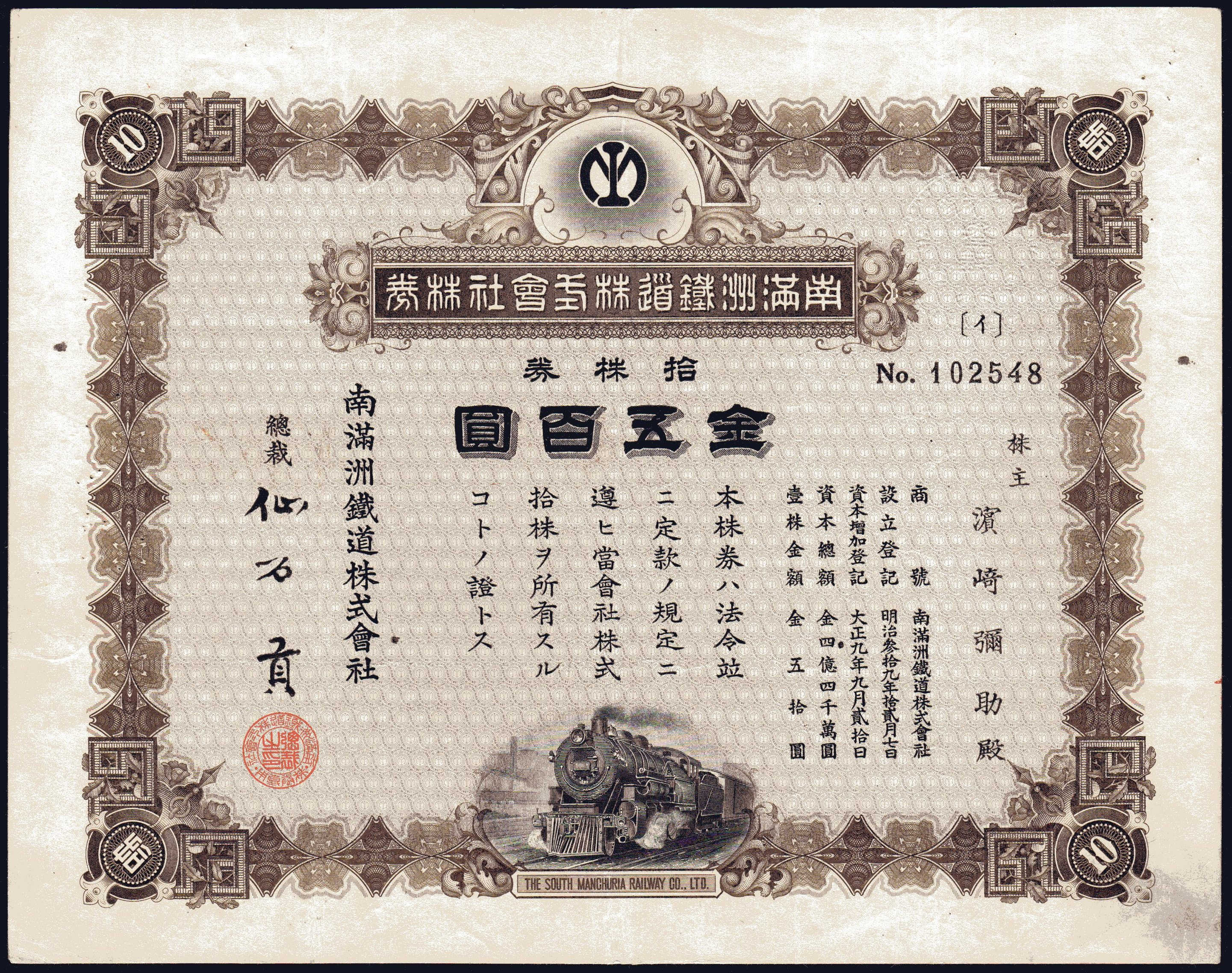
Share of the South Manchuria Railway Co. Ltd., issued 1920

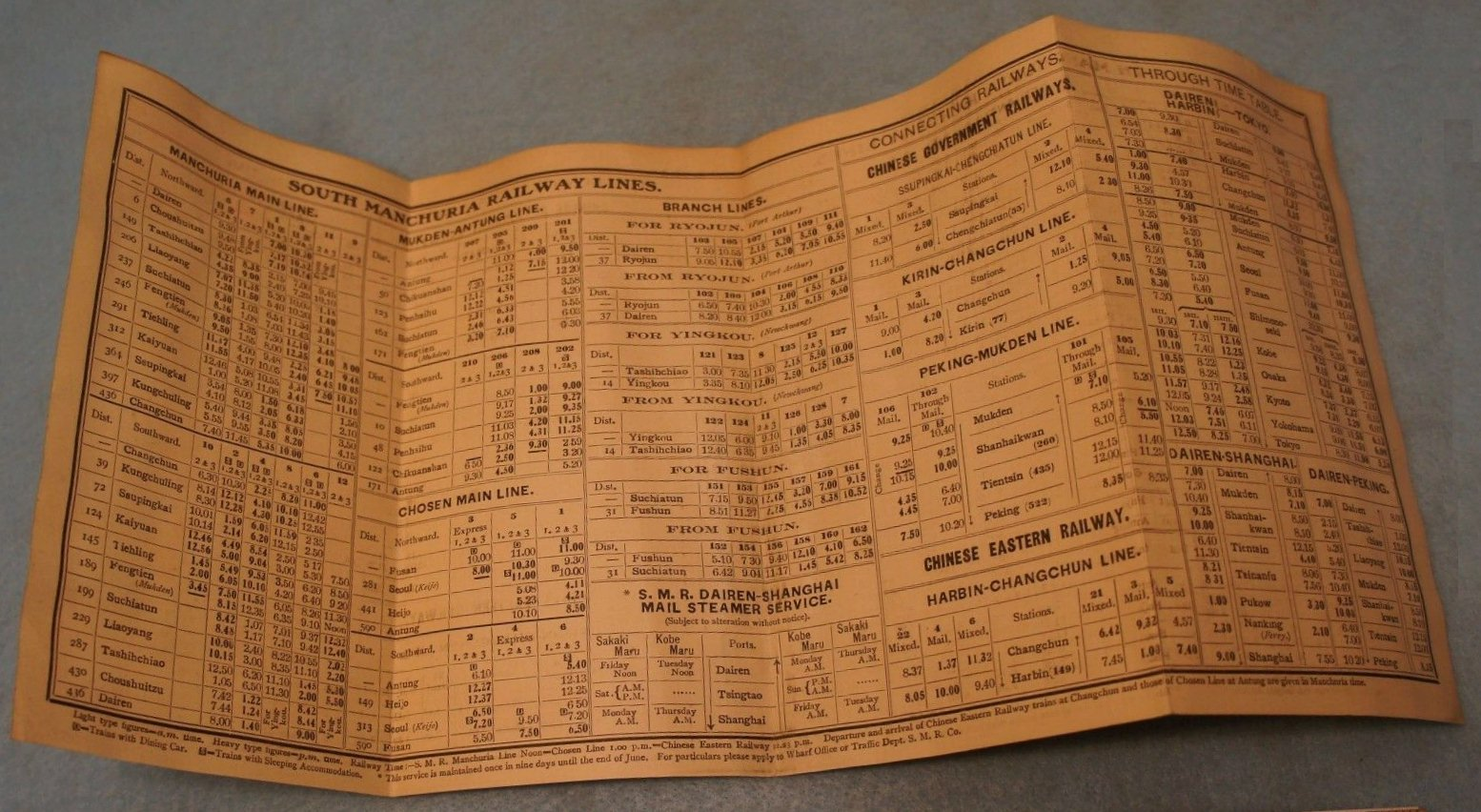
Schedule Page of South Manchuria Railway (Mantetsu) Train Service in May 1920

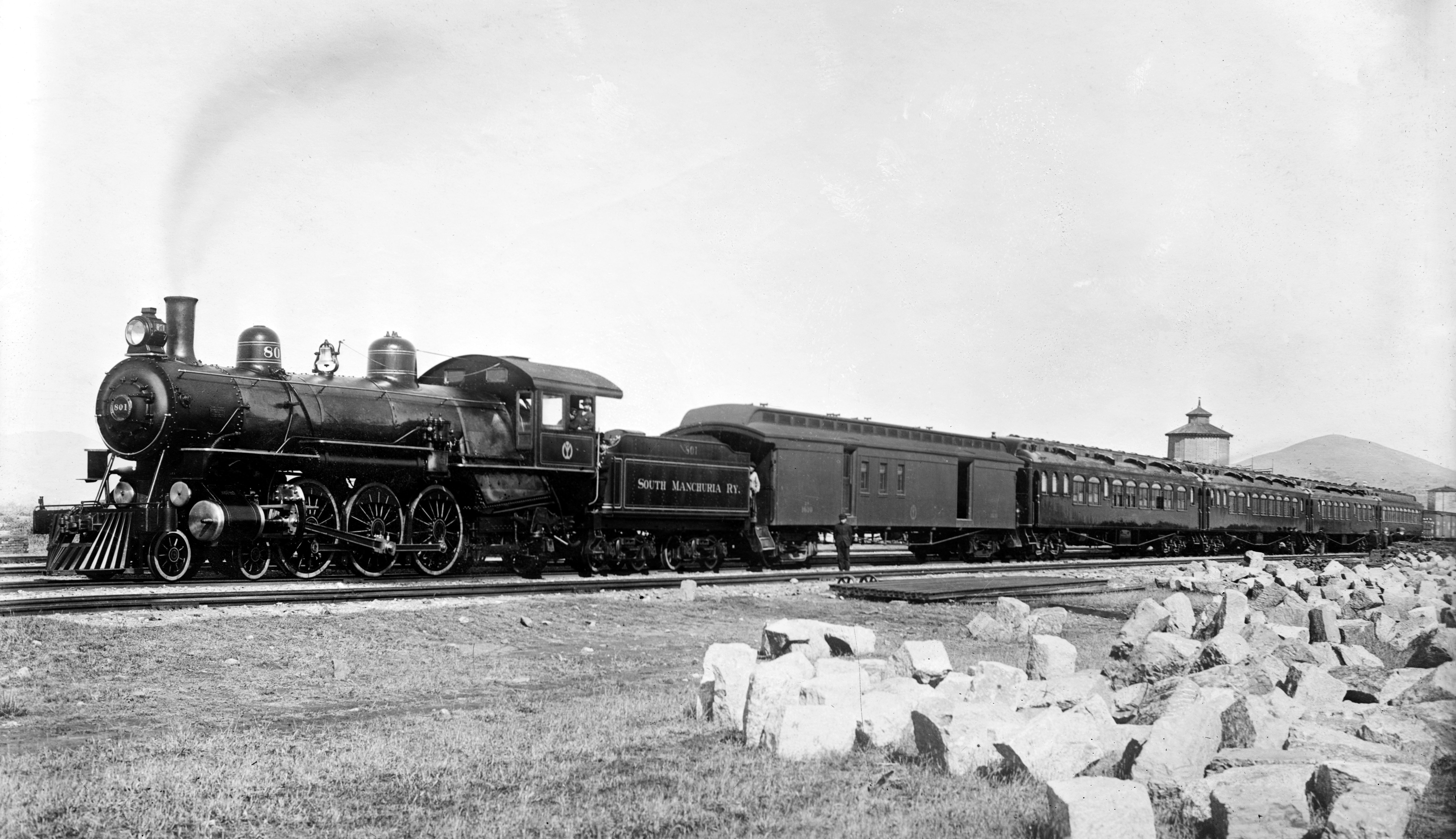
A train of the South Manchuria Railway

The South Manchuria Railway, officially the South Manchuria Railway Company, Ltd. (南満州鉄道株式会社, kyujitai: 南滿洲鐵道株式會社, Minamimanshū Tetsudō Kabushikigaisha), Mantetsu (Japanese: 満鉄, romanized: Mantetsu) or Mantie for short, was a large National Policy Company of the Empire of Japan whose primary function was the operation of railways on the Dalian–Fengtian (Mukden)–Changchun (called Xinjing from 1931 to 1945) corridor in northeastern China, as well as on several branch lines.

In 1905, after Russia's defeat in the Russo-Japanese War, this area was taken over by Japan as the South Manchuria Railway Zone. Mantetsu was established in 1906 to operate the railways taken over from the Russians. Subsequently, Mantetsu expanded by building new lines for itself and for Chinese-owned undertakings, and after the establishment of the puppet state of Manchukuo in 1932, it was also entrusted with the management of the Manchukuo National Railway. Between 1917 and 1925, Mantetsu was also responsible for the management of the Chōsen Government Railway in Japanese-occupied Korea.

However, it was also involved in nearly every aspect of the economic, cultural and political life of Manchuria, from power generation to agricultural research, for which reason it was often referred to as "Japan's East India Company in China". Nisshō Inoue, the founder of the interwar Japanese far-right militant organization Ketsumeidan (血盟団, League of Blood), was employed by Mantetsu from 1909 to 1920.

In 1945, the Soviet Union invaded and overran Manchukuo, and following Japan's defeat in the Pacific War, Mantetsu itself was dissolved by order of the American occupation authorities in occupied Japan. The railway was operated by the Soviets for a time, and handed over to China Railway after the establishment of the People's Republic of China in 1949. Fengtian has been called Shenyang since 1945, and the line from there to Dalian is today part of the Shenda Railway from Changchun to Dalian, whilst the Shenyang–Changchun section is now part of the Jingha Railway; the branch lines have also been part of China Railway since then.

== History ==
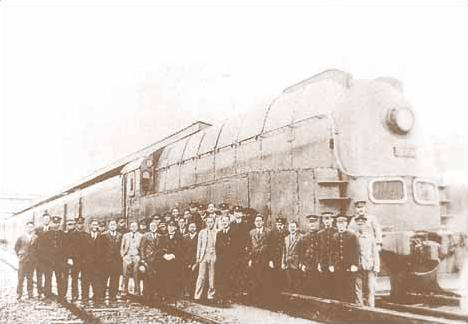
Locomotive for Asia Express

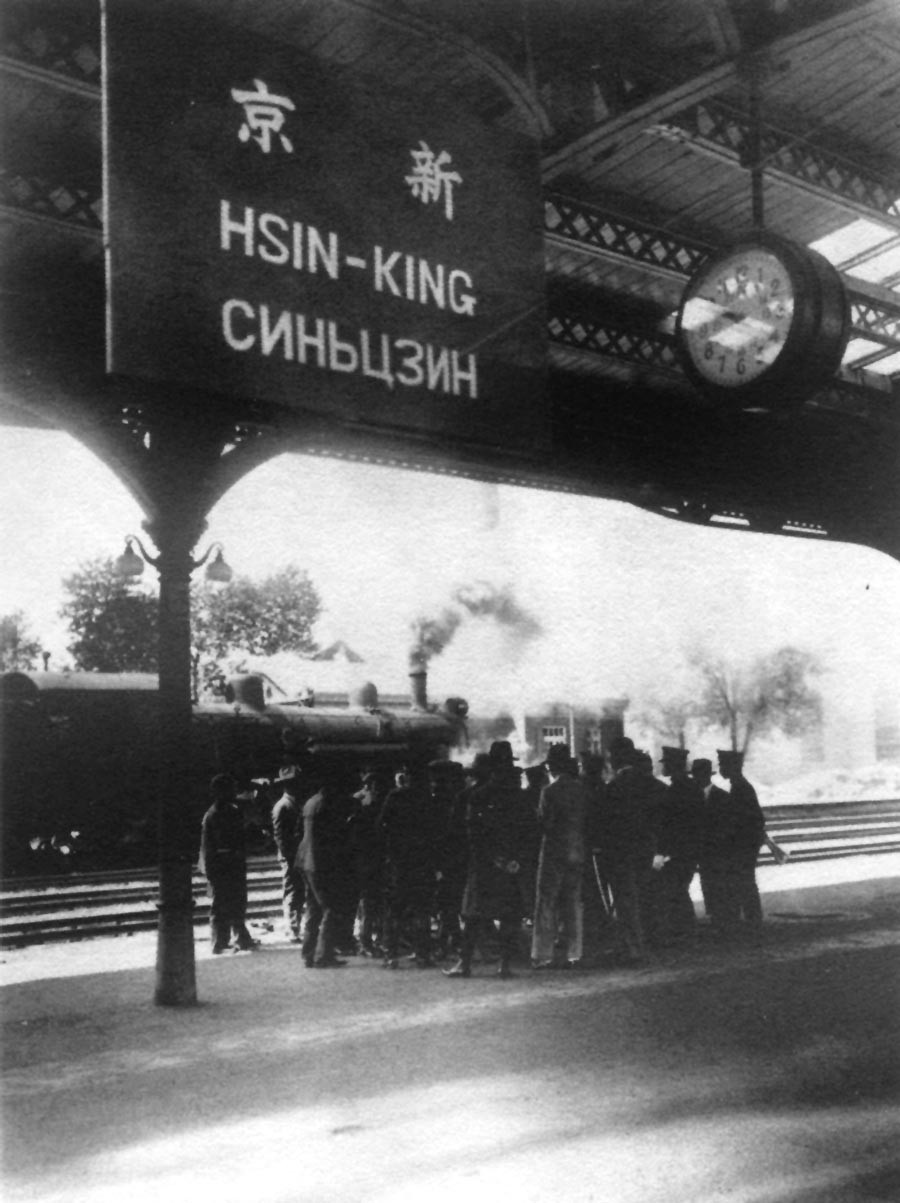
Xinjing (Changchun) Railway Station

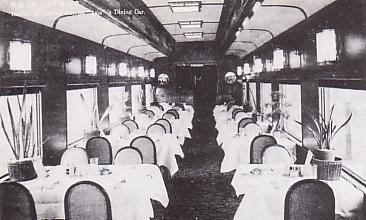
Dining car of South Manchuria Railway

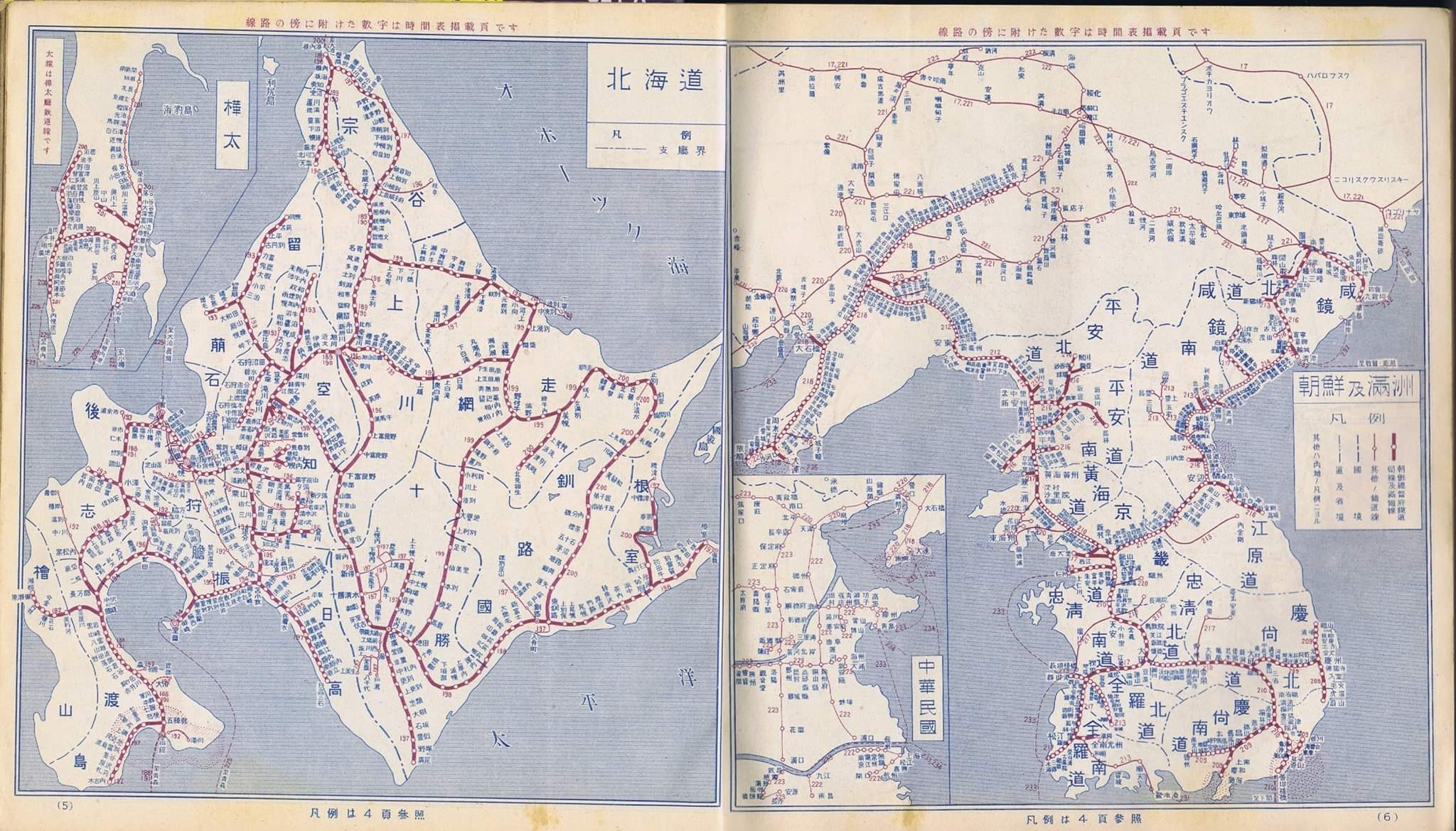
Japanese Government Railways map of Hokkaido, Chosen, Karahuto, and Manchukuo

The main line from Changchun to Port Arthur, as Luishun was called under Russian rule, was built between 1898 and 1903 by the Russians as the southern branch of their Chinese Eastern Railway according to the 1896 secret treaty and the 1898 lease convention between Qing China and Imperial Russia in the aftermath of the First Sino-Japanese War.

Following the Japanese victory over Imperial Russia in 1905 after the Russo-Japanese War and the signing of the Treaty of Portsmouth, most of the southern branch (Harbin—Port Arthur) of the China Eastern Railway was transferred to Japanese control. The last station remaining in Russian hands was at Kuanchengzi (寬城子) in modern-day Changchun. The northernmost Japanese-controlled station was the Changchun railway station.

Under the authorization of Emperor Meiji, Japan then established a new semi-privately held company, the South Manchurian Railway Company (a.k.a. Mantetsu), with a capitalization of 200 million yen to operate the railroad and to develop settlements and industries along its route. The organizing committee was headed by General Kodama Gentarō, and after his death, by General Terauchi Masatake. Count Gotō Shimpei, formerly the Japanese governor of Taiwan, was appointed the first president of the company, and the headquarters was established in Tokyo before relocated to Dalian in 1907.

One of the first tasks of the new company was to change the railway gauge. The rail line was originally built according to the gauge of 5 ft (1,524 mm), during the war it had been converted by the advancing Japanese troops to the Japanese 3 ft 6 in (1,067 mm) gauge, in order to facilitate the use of rolling stock brought from Japan. But once the new Japanese South Manchuria Railway Company took possession of the line, it had the tracks re-gauged again, now to the gauge of 4 ft 8 1/2 in (1,435 mm) standard gauge, presumably with an eye to connecting the system to other railways of China.

In 1907, an agreement was reached between the Japanese and Russian authorities about connecting the Japanese South Manchuria Railway with the line to the north, which remained in the hands of Russian China Far East Railway. According to the agreement, Russian gauge tracks would continue from the "Russian" Kuanchengzi Station to the "Japanese" Changchun station, and vice versa, tracks on the "gauge adapted by the South Manchuria Railway" (i.e., the standard gauge) would continue from the Changchun Station to the Kuancheng Station.

By the end of 1907, the company employed 9,000 Japanese and 4,000 Chinese. By 1910, those numbers had increased to 35,000 and 25,000 respectively. The railway used a significant amount of U.S.-made rails and signaling equipment, as well as some steam locomotives built by the American Locomotive Company at Dunkirk, NY. A visiting executive from the Erie Railroad was quite impressed with the arrangement, and described South Manchurian Railway ca. 1913 as "the only railroad in the whole world that is like our American railroads (and they are, fairly speaking, the best)".

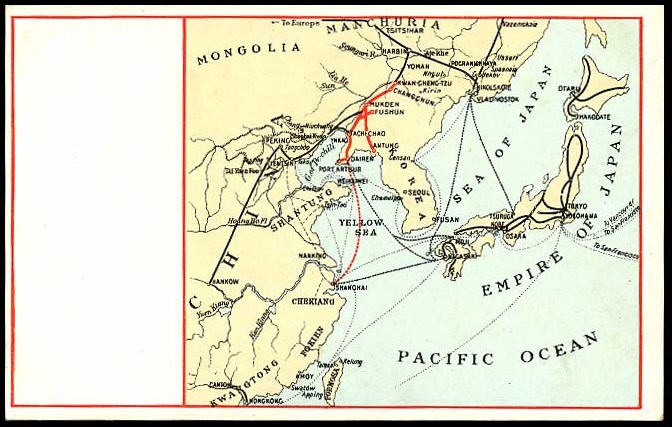
Promotional postcard from the 1920s

Mantetsu quickly expanded the system inherited from Russia to staggering proportions, building coal mines at Fushun and Yantai, and harbor facilities at Andong, Yingkou, and Dalian. At each station, Mantetsu built hotels for travelers and warehouses for goods. Japanese settlers were encouraged through the construction of schools, libraries, hospitals and public utilities. The Mantetsu Research Wing was the centerpiece of Japan's colonial program, and instigated agricultural research into development of soybean farming. Land under cultivation expanded 70% in 20 years.

From 1916, Mantestu began to spin off a number of subsidiary companies, including Showa Steel Works, Dalian Ceramics, Dalian Oil & Fat, South Manchurian Glass, as well as flour mills, sugar mills, electrical power plants, shale oil plants and chemical plants.

On 31 July 1917, the management of the Chosen Government Railway (Sentetsu) in Japanese-occupied Korea was transferred from the Railway Bureau of the Government-General of Korea to Mantetsu, which established the Mantetsu Keijō/Gyeongseong Railway Administration (Japanese: 満鉄京城管理局, Mantetsu Keijō Kanrikyoku; Korean: 만철 경성 관리국, Mancheol Gyeongseong Gwalliguk), and under Mantetsu control Korea's railway network was expanded rapidly. On 1 April 1925, management of Sentetsu was returned to the Railway Bureau, though Mantetsu retained control of the line along the Korea–Manchuria border from the port of Najin in Korea to Tumen in Manchuria and to Sangsambong in Korea. Mantetsu called this line the North Chosen Line, and it remained under Mantetsu control until 1945.

Company assets rose from 163 million yen in 1908 to over a billion yen in 1930. Mantetsu was by far the largest corporation in Japan, and also its most profitable, averaging rates of return from 25 to 45 percent per year. During the 1920s, Mantetsu provided for over a quarter of the Japanese government's tax revenues.

Over 75% of Mantetsu's income was generated by its freight business, with the key to profitability coming from soybean exports, both to Japan proper and to Europe. Soybean production increased exponentially with increasing demand for soy oil, and for soy meal for use in fertilizer and animal feed. By 1927, half of the world's supply of soybean was from Manchuria and the efforts by Mantetsu to expand production and to ship to export ports was a classic example of an extractive colonial economy dependent on a single product.

In 1931, the Mukden Incident occurred, where the Japanese military faked an attack on the railway by Chinese partisans as a pretext for the Japanese invasion of Manchuria.

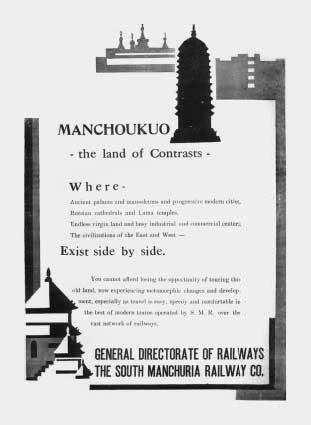
Advertisement in 1937

Mantetsu was also charged with a government-like role in managing the rail transportation system after the formation of Manchukuo in 1932, including management of the (theoretically independent) Manchukuo National Railway. By 1938, Mantetsu had 72 subsidiary companies, development projects in 25 urban areas and carried 17,515,000 passengers per year. Between 1930 and 1940, the Japanese population of Manchukuo rose by 800,000 making ethnic Japanese the majority in many of the towns and cities served by Mantetsu. Mantetsu prided itself on state-of-the-art urban planning, with modern sewer systems, public parks, and creative modern architecture far in advance of what could be found in Japan itself. These things were possible due to Mantetsu's tremendous profitability, and its political power to seize property and silence opposition and dissent at will through its political connections to the military and totalitarian national leadership.

In 1932, the Kwantung Army requested that the South Manchuria Railway establish an Economic Research Team. This team drafted many of Manchukuo's early economic policies and emphasized state control over the economy.

In 1934, Mantetsu inaugurated the "Asia Express", a high speed train from Dalian to the Manchukuo capital of Xinjing (Changchun). Reaching a top speed of 134 km/h (83 mph), the "Asia Express" was the fastest scheduled train in Asia at the time.

Changchun remained the break of gauge point between the Russian and standard gauges in the 1930s, until the Chinese Eastern railway itself was bought by Manchukuo and converted to the standard gauge in the mid-1930s.

In 1936, the company owned 466 locomotives, 554 coaches and 8134 goods wagons.

In 1945, the Soviet Union invaded and overran Manchukuo. Rolling stock and movable equipment was looted and taken back to the Soviet Union; some was returned when the Chinese Communist government came into power. Mantetsu itself was dissolved by order of the American occupation authorities in occupied Japan. The People's Republic of China government later merged the northern half of the South Manchuria Railway's mainline (the Renkyō Line) with other railway lines to form the present Beijing–Harbin railway.

=== Railway dining car service ===
In conjunction with magazine advertising by Japan Tourist Bureau (JTB), the railway attempted to create a unique food culture in Manchukuo. They offered a variety of special cuisine such as Yamato beef steak, Mongolian barbeque, and sorghum vulgare (kaoliang) confectionery in dining cars along the line and in the railway-operated Yamato Hotel. There was little uptake in the cuisine however after the fall of Manchukuo.

== Network ==
- Anpō Line: Fengtian–Andong, 260.2 km (161.7 mi)
- Bushun Line: Sujiatun–Fushun, 52.9 km (32.9 mi), electrified
- Eikō Line: Dashiqiao–Yingkou, 22.4 km (13.9 mi)
- Endai Colliery Line: Yantai–Yantai Colliery, 15.6 km (9.7 mi), freight only
- Futō Line: Shahekou–Dalian Quay, 6.9 km (4.3 mi), freight only
- Gusai Line: Dalian–Wuqi, 2.9 km (1.8 mi), freight only
- Kanseishi Line: Nanguangling–Dalian Ganjingzi Quay, 11.9 km (7.4 mi), freight only
- Kinjō Line: Jinzhou–Chengzitan, 102.1 km (63.4 mi)
- Kon'yu Connecting Line: Hunhe–Yushutai, 4.1 km (2.5 mi), freight only
- North Chosen East Line: Tumen, Manchukuo–Namyang, Korea–Unggi, Korea, 158.5 km (98.5 mi)
- North Chosen West Line: Sangsambong–Namyang 36.0 km (22.4 mi) (entirely in Korea)
- Nyūzen Line: Shahekou–Ruchuan Quay, 5.8 km (3.6 mi), freight only
- Rashinfutō Line: Najin–Najin Quay, 3.0 km (1.9 mi), freight only (entirely in Korea)
- Renkyō Line: Dalian–Xinjing, 701.4 km (435.8 mi)
- Ryojun Line: Zhoushuizi–Lüshun, 50.8 km (31.6 mi)
- Ryūshuton Line: Dafangshen–Liushutun, 5.8 km (3.6 mi)
- Jōhei Line: Donggwan–Seongpyeong, 11.5 km (7.1 mi) (owned by Chosen Government Railway)
- Tōho Line: Cheongseong–Tongpo, 15.6 km (9.7 mi) (owned by Chosen Government Railway)
- Yūra Line: Unggi–Najin, 15.2 km (9.4 mi) (entirely in Korea)

== Mantetsu presidents ==
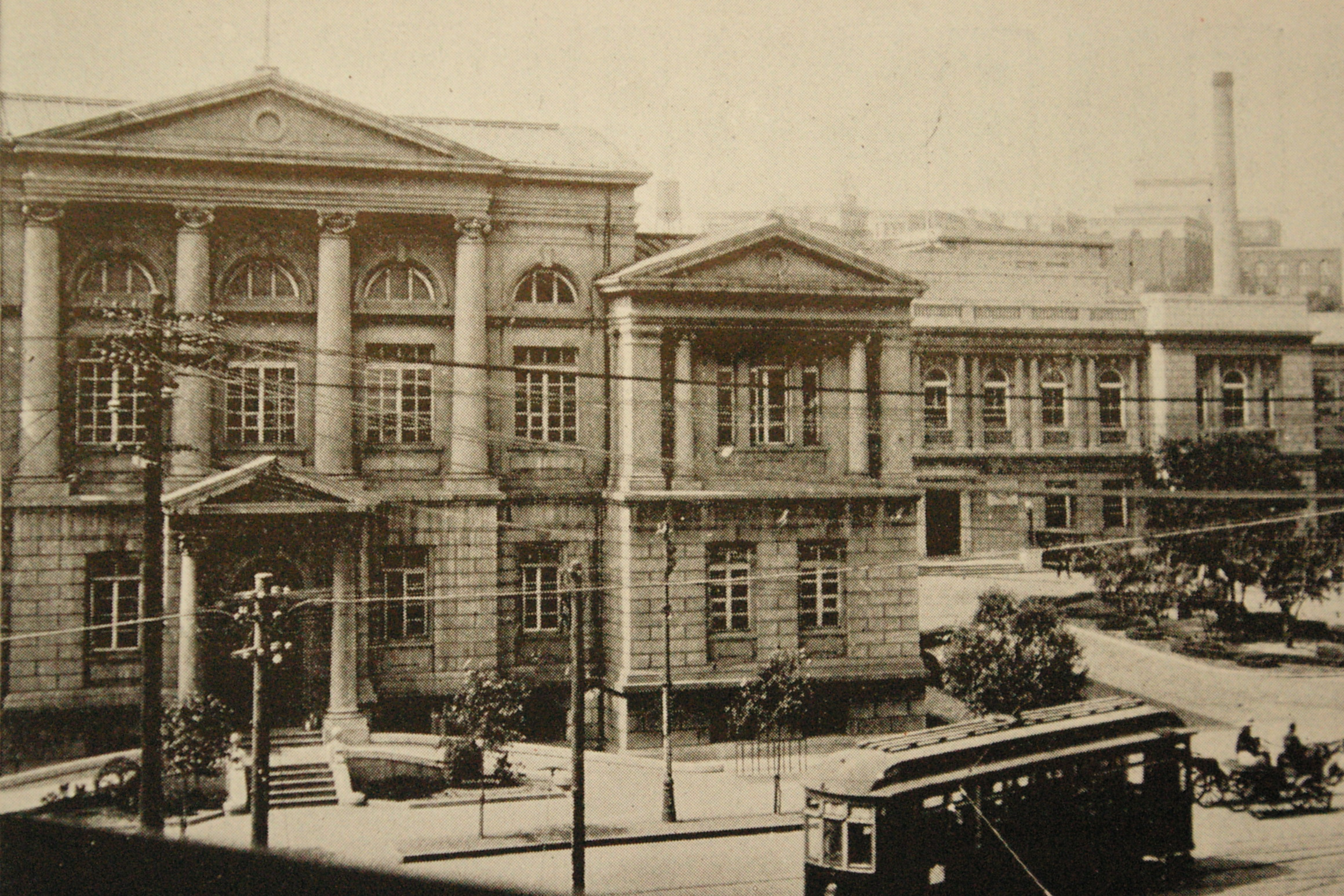
Headquarters of South Manchuria Railway, Dalian

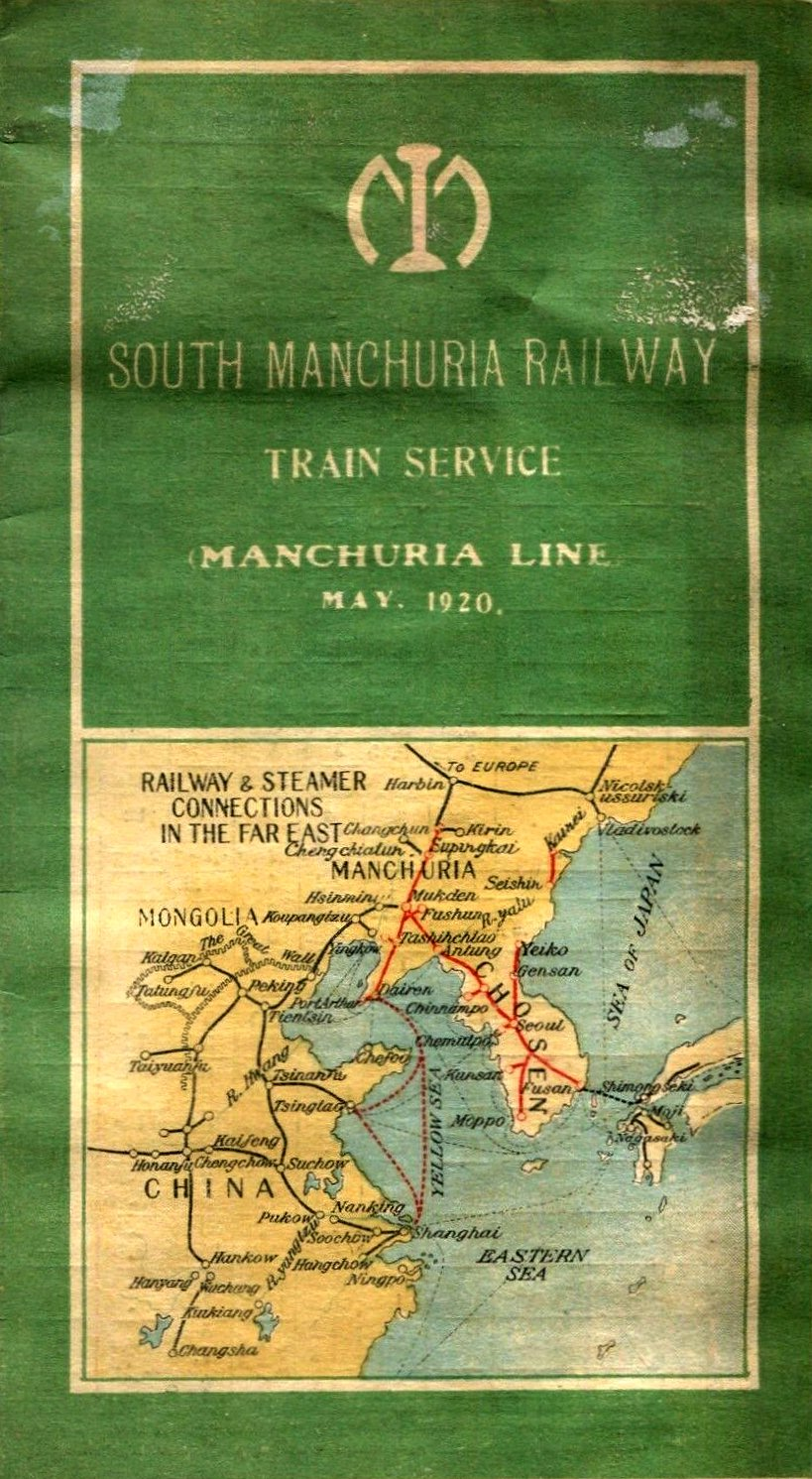
Cover Page of South Manchuria Railway (Mantetsu) Train Service Timetable in May 1920

	Name	From	To
1	Shinpei Goto	13 November 1906	14 July 1908
2	Yoshikoto Nakamura	19 December 1908	18 December 1913
3	Ryutaro Nomura	19 December 1913	15 July 1914
4	Yujiro Nakamura	15 July 1914	31 July 1917
5	Shimbei Kunisawa	31 July 1917	12 April 1919
6	Ryutaro Nomura	12 April 1919	31 May 1921
7	Senkichiro Hayakawa	31 May 1921	14 October 1922
8	Kawamura Takeji	24 October 1922	22 June 1924
9	Banichiro Yasuhiro	22 June 1924	19 July 1927
10	Jōtaro Yamamoto	19 July 1927	14 August 1929
11	Mitsugu Sengoku	14 August 1929	13 June 1931
12	Yasuya Uchida	13 June 1931	6 July 1932
13	Hakutaro Hayashi	26 July 1932	2 August 1935
14	Yōsuke Matsuoka	2 August 1935	24 March 1939
15	Takuichi Ohmura	24 March 1939	14 July 1943
16	Naoto Kobiyama	14 July 1943	11 April 1945
17	Motoki Yamazaki	5 May 1945	30 September 1945

== See also ==
- Rolling stock of the South Manchuria Railway
- Manchukuo National Railway
- Kwantung Leased Territory
- South Manchuria Railway Zone
- Yamato Hotels
