= Katsuji Akihara =

Japanese and Manchukuoan author

- 秋原勝二
- Akihara in 2012
- Born: Jun Watanabe; June 1913; Fukushima, Fukushima Prefecture, Empire of Japan
- Died: April 17, 2015 (aged 101); Tokyo, Japan
- Citizenship: Japan; Manchukuo (until 1945)
- Education: Dalian Manchuria Railway Training School
- Occupation(s): Novelist, writer, publisher, accountant
- Years active: 1930–2015
- Known for: Publisher of Sakubun (1964–2015)

Katsuji Akihara (Note: Sometimes spelled in English as Kasuji. Japanese: 秋原勝二) (June 1913 – April 17, 2015) was the pen name of Japanese-Manchukuoan novelist and writer Jun Watanabe. He primarily contributed to Sakubun, a Japanese language magazine based in Dalian.

== Early life ==
Jun Watanabe was born in Fukushima Prefecture in June 1913. After losing his parents, he moved to Manchuria with his brother at the age of seven. He graduated from the Dalian Manchuria Railway Training School and began working in the accounting department of the Manchuria Railway Company in 1930. After two years with the railway company, he joined the staff of Sakubun, a literary magazine written by railroad employees.

== Writing career ==
Akihara began authoring articles in 1936. The magazine's 55th and final edition was published in December 1942.

Akihara returned to Japan in the mid-1940s, eventually settling in Tokyo.

=== Sakubun reborn ===
In 1964, Akihara re-established Sakubun, which began publishing new issues twice a year. He served as the magazine's publisher until his death in 2015, releasing its final issue (volume 208) that same year. Sakubun ceased publication shortly thereafter.

As a writer, Akihara is best remembered for his essay “Hometown Lost” (故郷 喪失, Kokyō sōshitsu), which explores themes of family loss and rural poverty in Japan. Originally published in a 1937 issue of Sakubun, it reached a broader audience through the second edition of The Manchuria Year Book.

== Sources ==
- Okada, Hideki (2018-07-11). "Arimichi sakka Aoki Minoru ―`manjin mo no', soshite sengo" 在満作家青木實―「満人もの」、そして戦後 [Manchuria-based writer Aoki Minoru: "Manchurians" and the postwar period] (PDF). Ritsumeikan University Law Journal (in Japanese). 6 (March 2018). Kyoto, Japan: Ritsumeikan University: 195–226. ISSN 2434-2009..
