= Namyang station =

Railway station in Namyang-rodongjagu

Namyang 남양
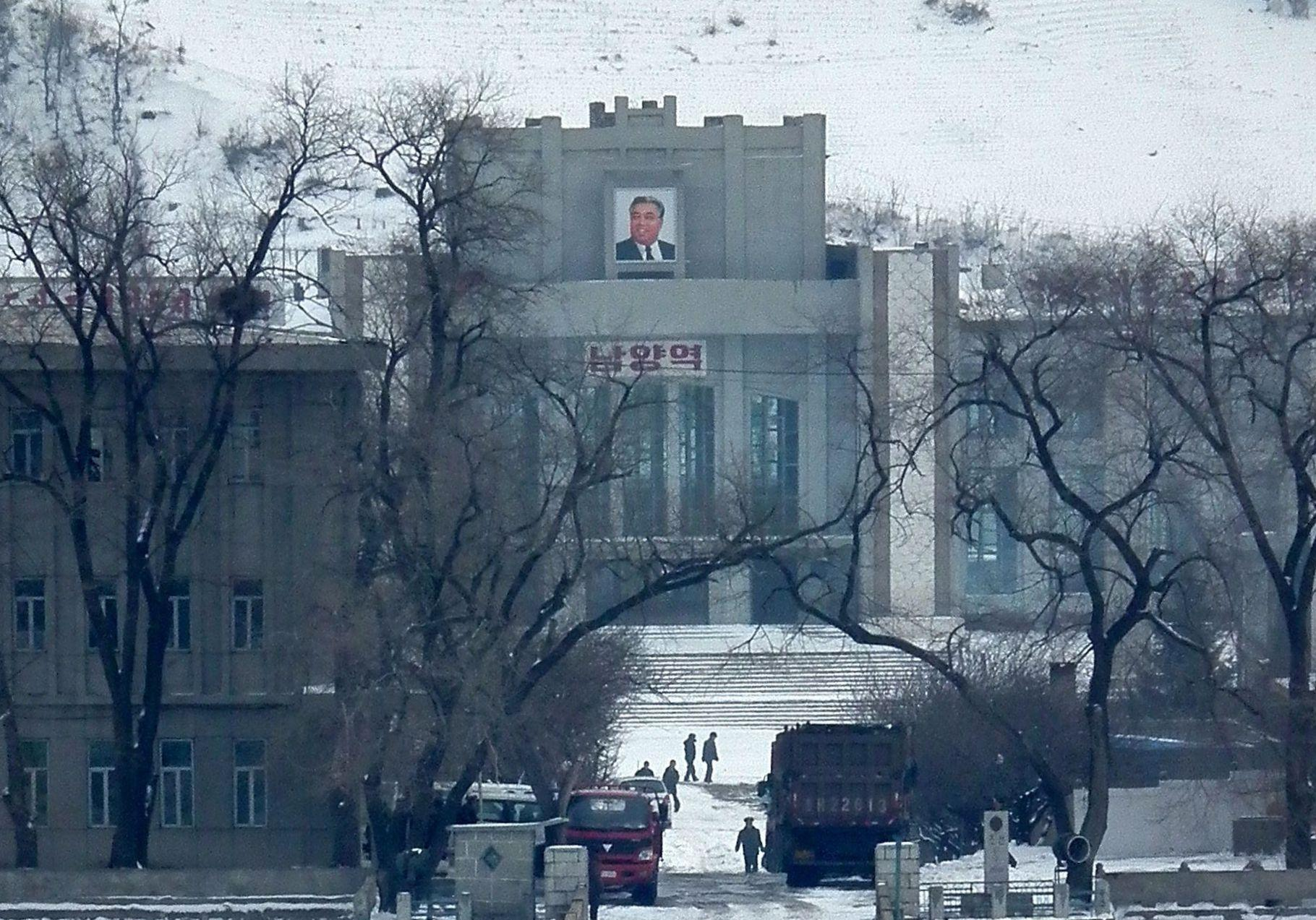
- Namyang station

Korean name
- Hangul: 남양역
- Hanja: 南陽驛
- Revised Romanization: Namyang-yeok
- McCune–Reischauer: Namyang-yŏk

General information
- Location: Namyang-rodongjagu, Onsŏng, North Hamgyŏng; North Korea
- Coordinates: 42.9530°N 129.8577°E
- Owner: Korean State Railway

History
- Opened: 1 December 1932
- Original company: Chosen Government Railway

Services
Preceding station	Korean State Railway	Following station
P'ungri towards Rajin	Hambuk Line	Kangyang towards Ch'ŏngjin Ch'ŏngnyŏn
Terminus	Namyang Border Line	Kukkyŏng towards Tumen (China)
Location

Namyang station is a railway station in Namyang-rodongjagu, Onsŏng county, North Hamgyŏng, North Korea, on the Hambuk Line of the Korean State Railway, and there is a bridge across the Tumen River, giving a connection to the Chinese railway network at Tumen, China via the Namyang Border Line.

It provides servicing facilities for freight cars.

== History ==
It was opened by the Chosen Government Railway on 1 December 1932, together with the rest of the Namyang-P'ungri section of the former East Tomun Line (Tonggwanjin–Unggi).

== Services ==
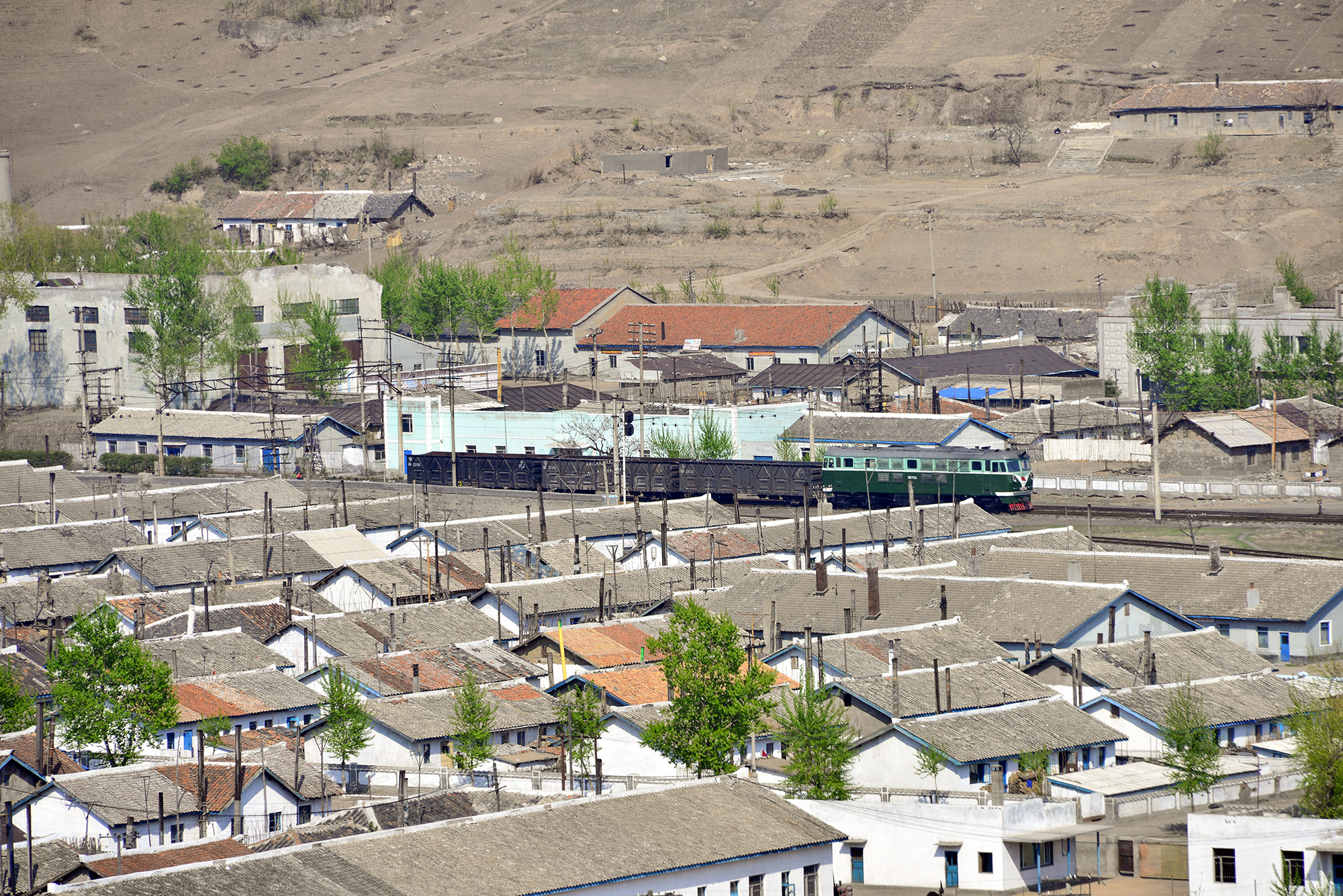
A freight train at Namyang station

=== Freight ===
Some cross-border freight traffic between the DPRK and China is handled at Namyang station; the primary exports shipped through Namyang to China are magnetite, talc and steel, and the main import is coke.

=== Passenger ===
A number of passenger trains serve Namyang station, including the semi-express trains 113/114, operating between West P'yŏngyang and Unsŏng via Ch'ŏngjin and Hoeryŏng. There are also long-distance trains Kalma-Ch'ŏngjin-Hoeryŏng-Rajin; Ch'ŏngjin-Hoeryŏng-Rajin; Haeju-Ch'ŏngjin-Hoeryŏng-Unsŏng; and Tanch'ŏn-Ch'ŏngjin-Hoeryŏng-Tumangang. There is also a commuter service operated between Namyang and Hunyung.
