= Namyanggukkyong Line =

Railway line in North Korea

Namyang Border Line
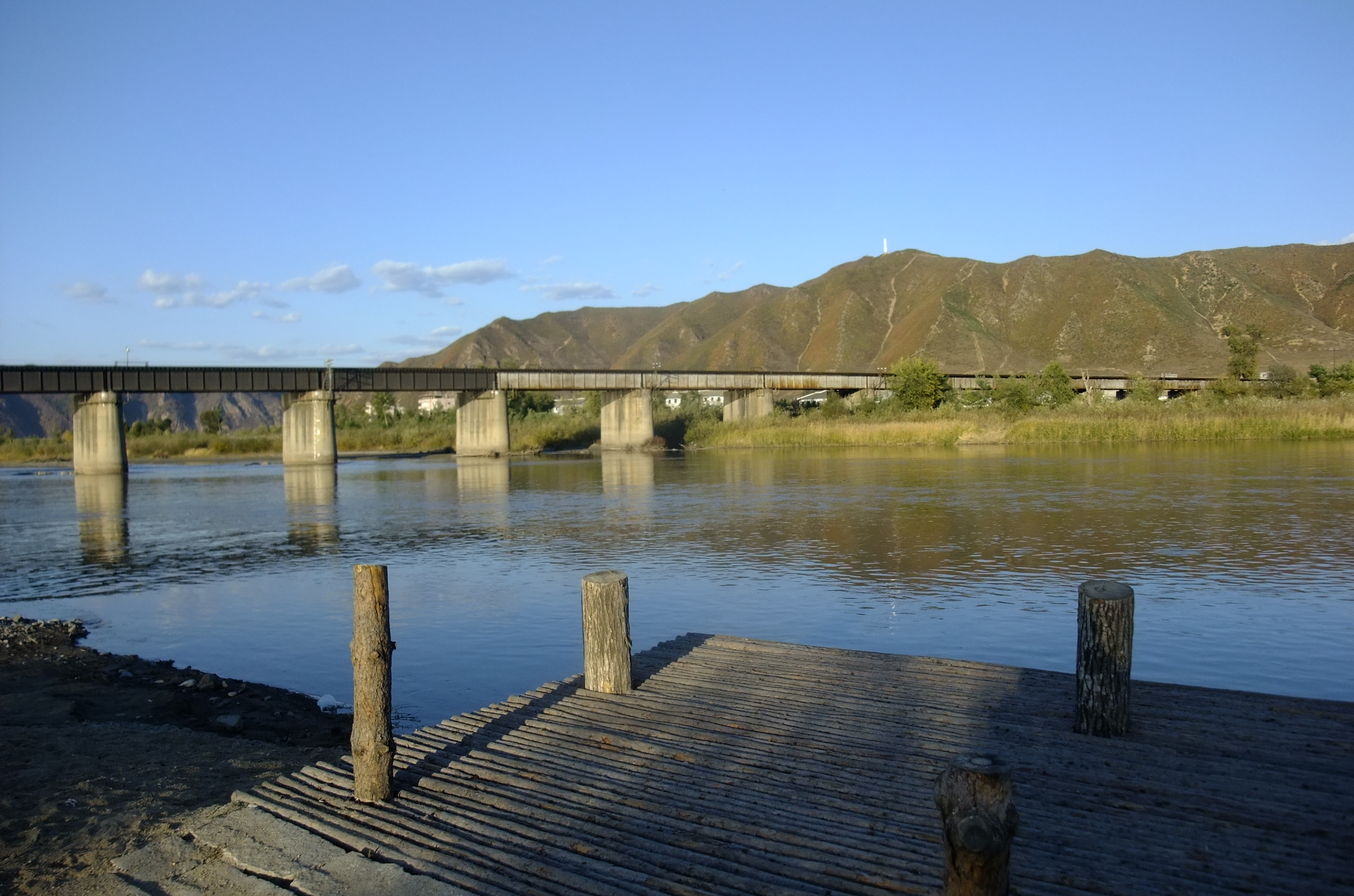
- The railway bridge over the Tumen River

Overview
- Native name: 남양국경선(南陽國境線)
- Status: Operational
- Owner: South Manchuria Railway (1933–1945); Korean State Railway (since 1945)
- Locale: North Hamgyŏng
- Termini: Namyang; Kukkyŏng
- Stations: 2

Service
- Type: Heavy rail, Passenger & freight rail Regional rail

History
- Opened: 1 August 1933

Technical
- Line length: 0.8 km (0.50 mi)
- Number of tracks: Single track
- Track gauge: 1,435 mm (4 ft 8 1/2 in) standard gauge
- Electrification: 3000 V DC Catenary

- Namyanggukkyong Line
- Hangul: 남양국경선
- Hanja: 南陽國境線
- RR: Namyanggukgyeongseon
- MR: Namyanggukkyŏngsŏn

The Namyanggukkyŏng Line, or Namyang Border Line, is a 0.8 km (0.50 mi) long railway line of the Korean State Railway connecting Namyang on the Hambuk Line with Kukkyŏng at the DPRK–China border, continuing on to Tumen, China, 3.3 km (2.1 mi) from Namyang. At Tumen it connects with China Railway's Changtu Railway (Changchun–Tumen; 长图铁路), Tujia Railway (Tumen–Jiamusi; 图佳铁路), and Tuhun Railway (Tumen–South Hunchun–Changlingzi and on to Russia; 图珲铁路). The line is electrified between Namyang and Kukkyong.

== History ==
The Chosen Government Railway (Sentetsu) nationalised the privately owned Tomun Railway on 1 April 1929, acquiring the private railway's route from Hoeryŏng to Tonggwanjin (now Kangalli) and calling it the "West Tomun Line". Intending to create as short a route as possible from Japan to Manchuria, Sentetsu had started building its own "East Tomun Line" from Unggi (now Sŏnbong) towards Tonggwanjin in 1929, eventually reaching Namyang on 1 December 1932, and finally closed the final gap between Namyang and Tonggwanjin on 1 August 1933, thus completing the Tomun Line from Hoeryŏng to Unggi; Tonggwanjin station was renamed Tonggwan at that time.

At the same time as the Namyang–Tonggwan section of the mainline was opened, a bridge was built over the Tumen River at Namyang, along with a line to Tumen, Manchukuo. This connected Sentetsu to the Manchukuo National Railway's new Jingtu Line from Xinjing (now Changchun), capital of Manchukuo, to Tumen, that was also opened in 1933. This established the desired shortest-possible connection from Japan to Harbin via the Korean ports of Ch'ŏngjin and Unggi through Xinjing.

On 1 October 1933, management of Sentetsu's entire route from Ch'ŏngjin to Unggi was transferred to the South Manchuria Railway (Mantetsu), and on 1 November 1934 the Unggi–Namyang section of the Domun Line and the Namyang–Tumen line were merged to form Mantetsu's North Chosen East Line (Unggi–Namyang–Tumen); the Namyang–Sambong section became the North Chosen West Line. In 1936, the "Asahi" express train between Xinjing and Rajin was inaugurated, to connect to the ferry from Rajin to Japan.

In 1940, management of the Ch'ŏngjin–Sambong route was transferred back to Sentetsu, which made it part of its Hamgyeong Line; Mantetsu continued to manage the North Chosen East Line, eventually acquiring outright ownership of the line.

== Services ==
The line is used for import-export traffic between the DPRK and China; the primary exports shipped through to China are magnetite, talc and steel, and the main import is coke. These trains are often hauled by Chinese or Korean DF5-type locomotives.

== Route ==
A yellow background in the "Distance" box indicates that section of the line is not electrified.

Distance (km)		Station Name		Former Name		
Total	S2S	Transcribed	Chosŏn'gŭl (Hanja)	Transcribed	Chosŏn'gŭl (Hanja)	Connections
0.0	0.0	Namyang	남양 (南陽)			Hambuk Line
0.8	0.8	Kukkyŏng	국경 (國境)			
1.2	0.4	Tumen Border Railway Bridge	두만강 (豆滿江)			DPRK−PRC border
3.3	3.3	Tumen, China	图们 (圖們)			China Railway Changtu Railway, Tujia Railway, Tuhun Railway
