= Yamato Hotel =

Defunct hotel chain in China

Yamato Hotels (Japanese: ヤマトホテル, romanized: Yamato hoteru; Chinese: 大和旅馆, romanized: Dàhé lǚguǎn) was a chain of hotels in Manchuria owned and operated by the South Manchuria Railway during the period from the 1910s to 1940s. Some of these hotels still exist in Northeast China, under different names.

== Background ==
During the time of the South Manchuria Railway Company's operations within various cities in Manchuria between 1907 and 1945, the South Manchuria Railway Company was involved in the management of a series of high-grade chain hotels. The South Manchuria Railway Company's department of transportation was responsible for high-class hotels within its jurisdiction, which were intended as a place for men to stay during times of military activity. A number of Yamato hotels were built, including the following:

- Dairen: Opened on August 1, 1914, renamed Dalian Hotel in 1956 (Chinese: 大连宾馆), will be rebranded as Fairmont Dalian
- Hoshigaura (Star Beach): Beach resort in suburban Dairen.
- Ryojun (Port Arthur): Opened March 21, 1908 by the Russians, when the city was known as Port Arthur. Today used by the People's Liberation Army, not open to foreigners.
- Mukden: Opened in 1910, current building constructed in 1929, used now as the Liaoning Hotel (Chinese: 辽宁宾馆). Mao Zedong, Deng Xiaoping and other political dignitaries used to stay there.
- Hsinking (Changchun): Built in 1910, used now as the old building of the Chunyi Hotel (Chinese: 春谊宾馆).
- Harbin: Originally built by the Russians in 1905, re-built by the Japanese in 1935, used now as the Longmen Dasha VIP Hotel (Chinese: 龙门大厦贵宾楼).

== See also ==
- Manchukuo
- South Manchuria Railway

== Gallery ==
Yamato Hotels

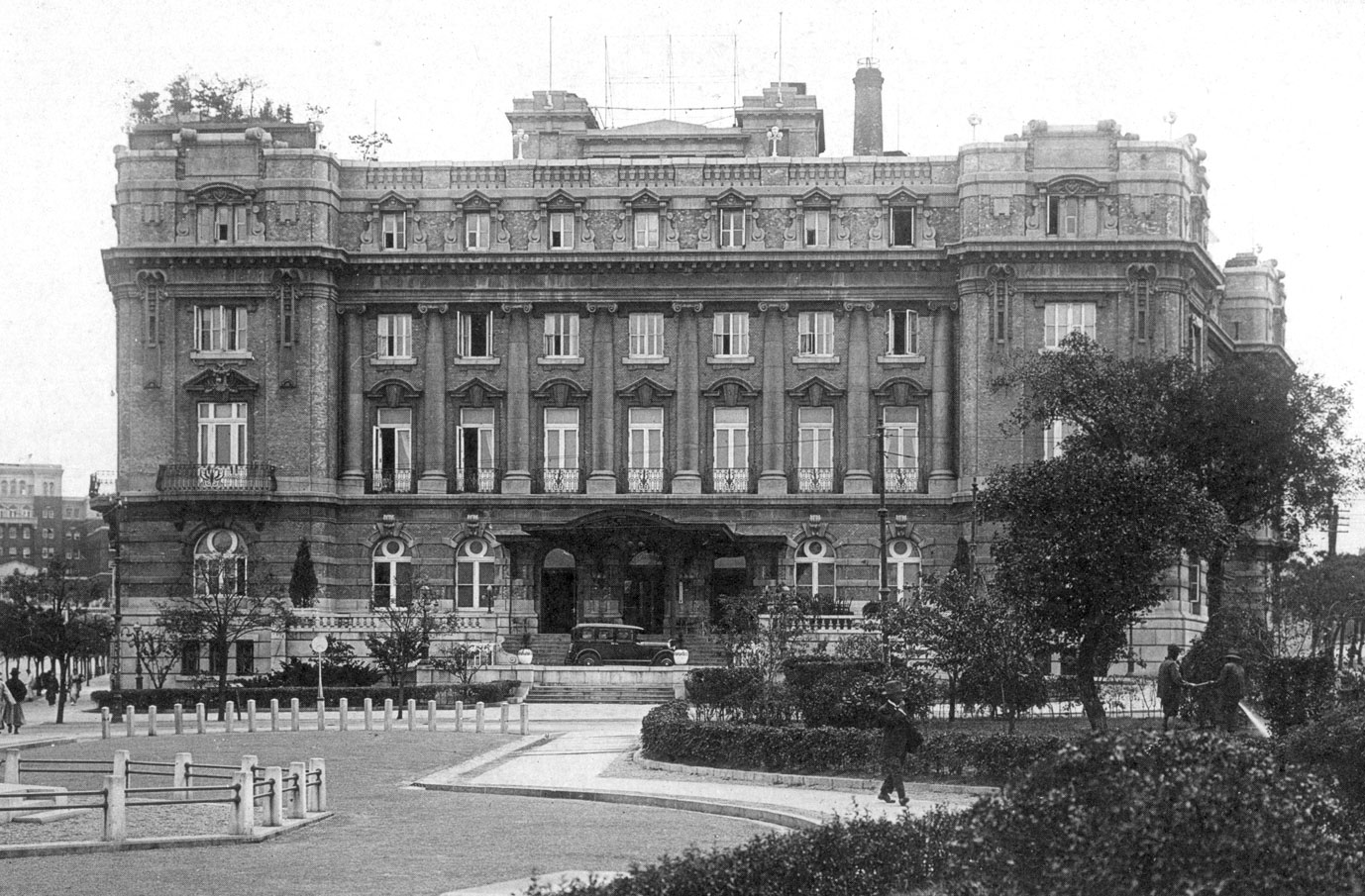
Yamato Hotel in Dalian

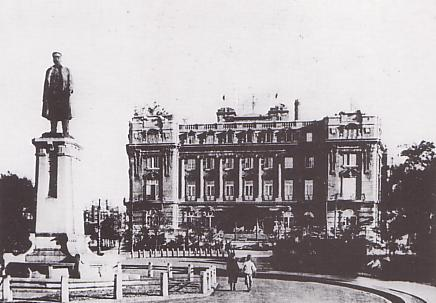
Yamato Hotel in Dalian

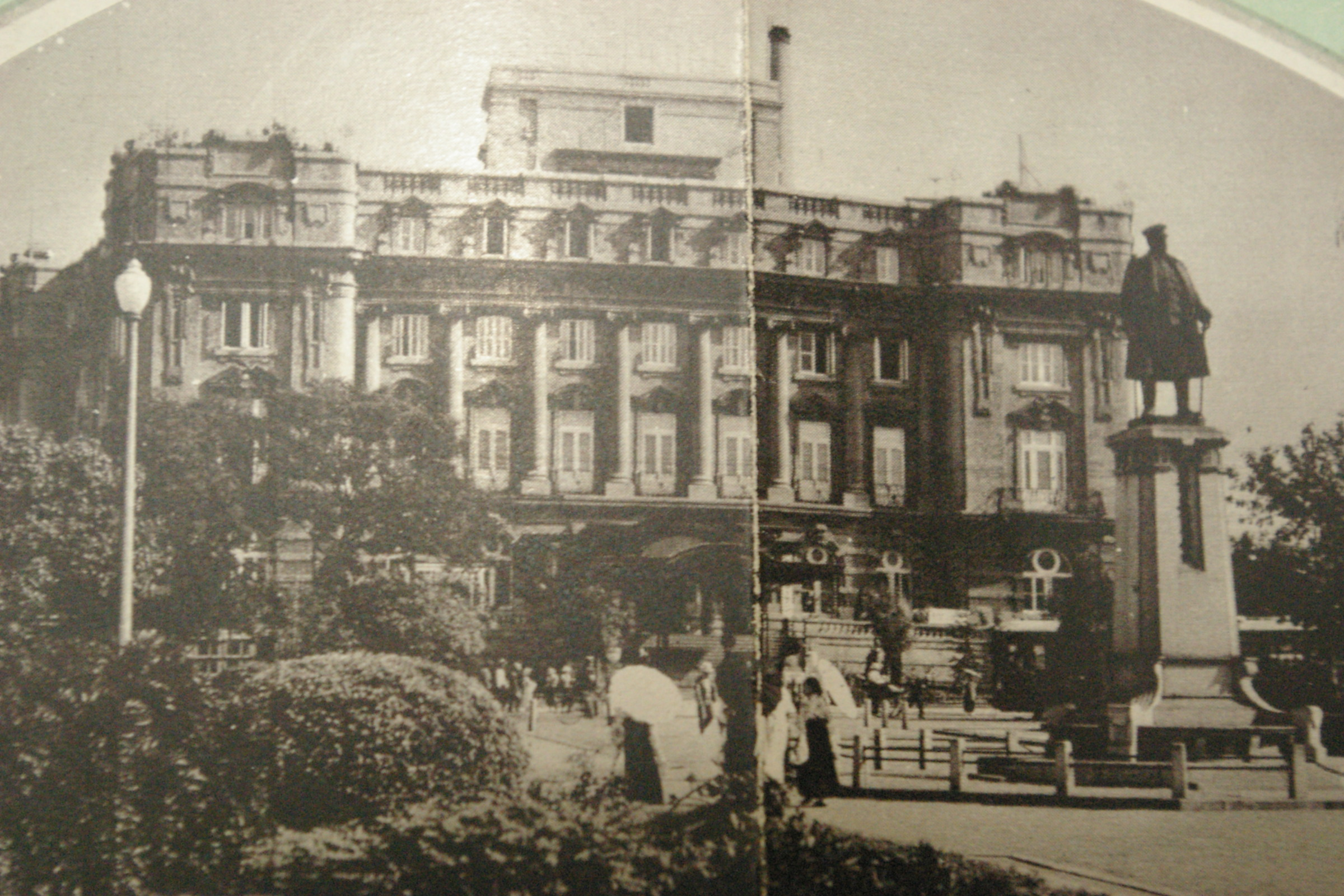
Yamato Hotel in Dalian

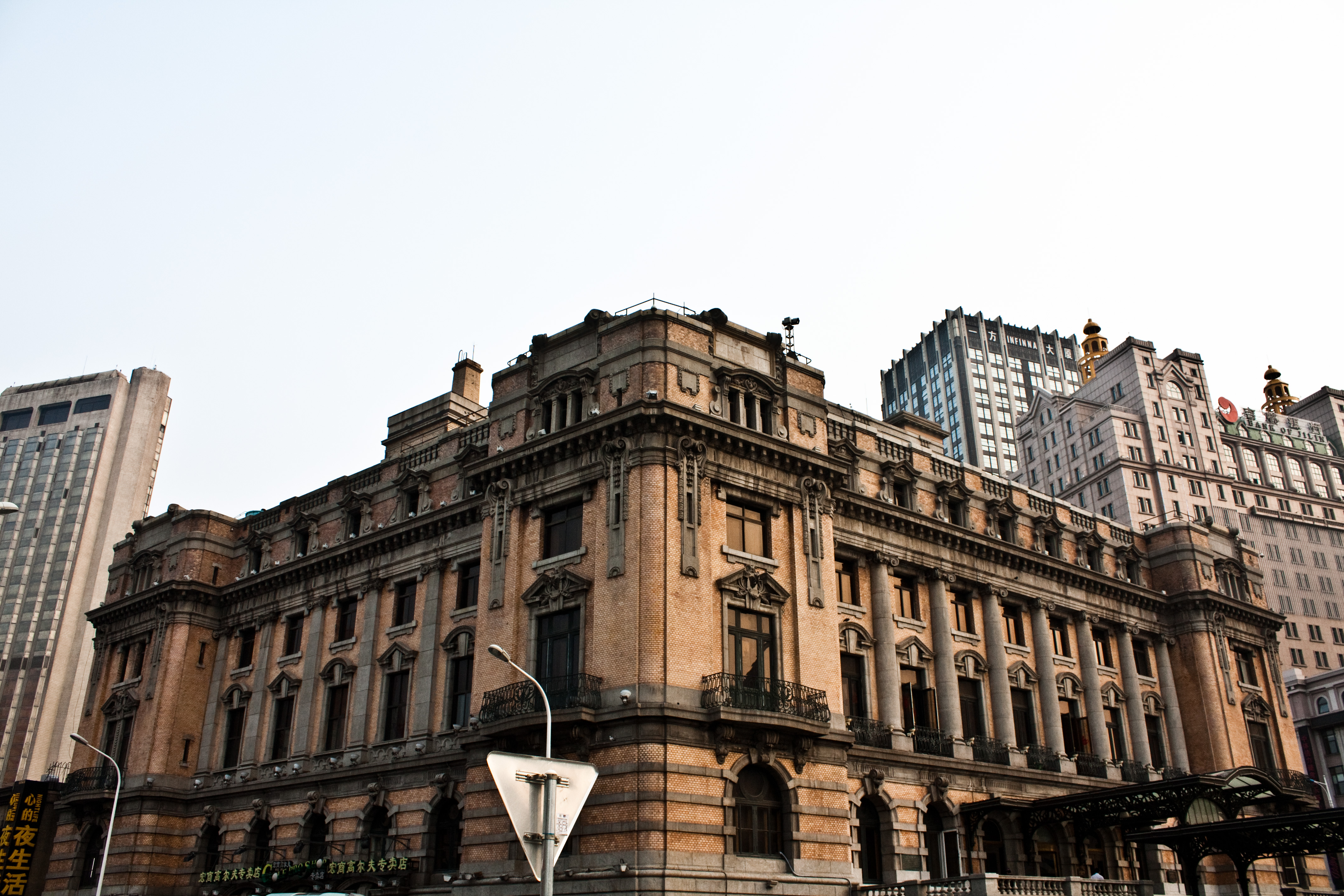
Yamato Hotel in Dalian, 2010

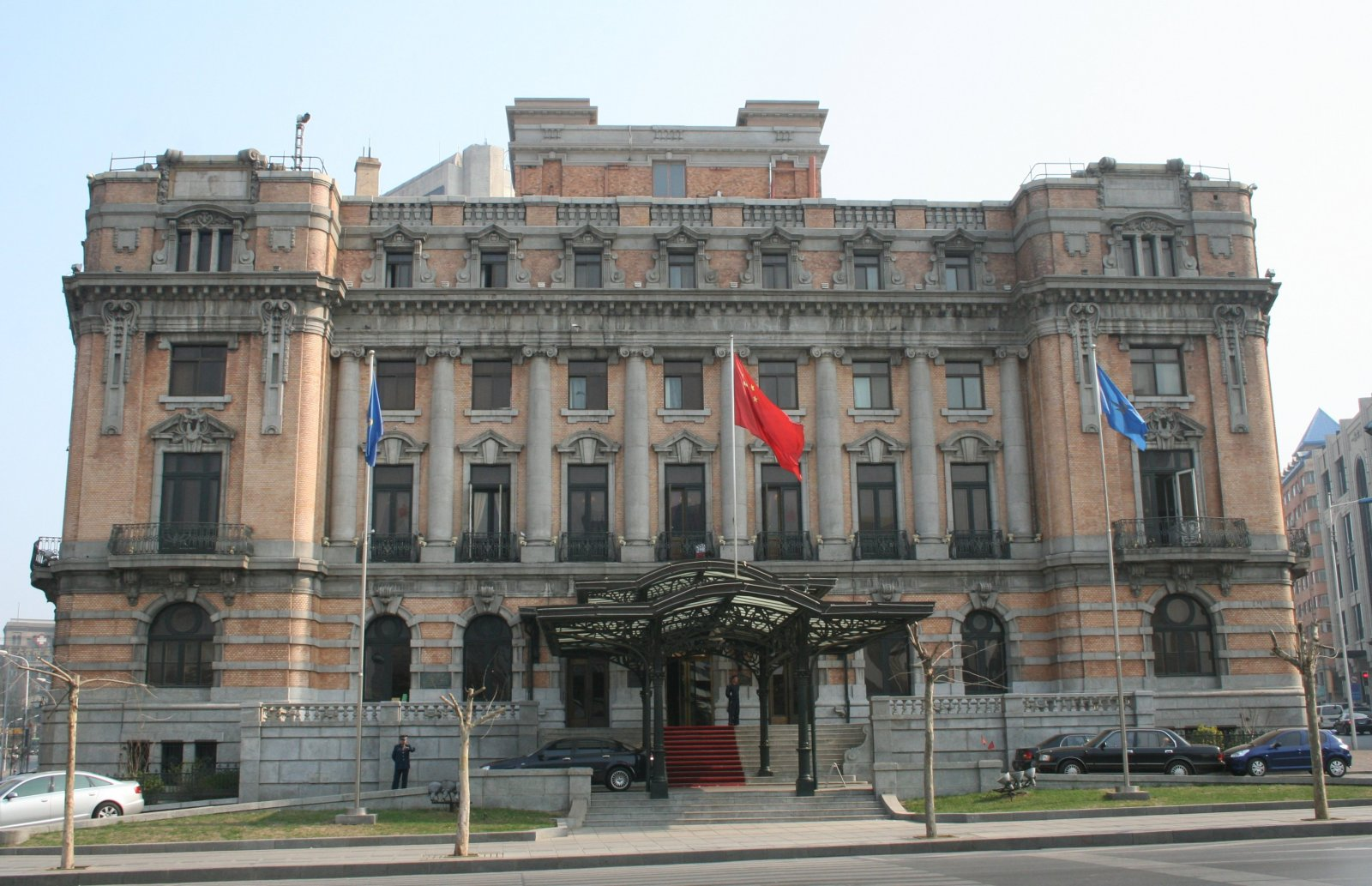
Yamato Hotel in Dalian, 2009

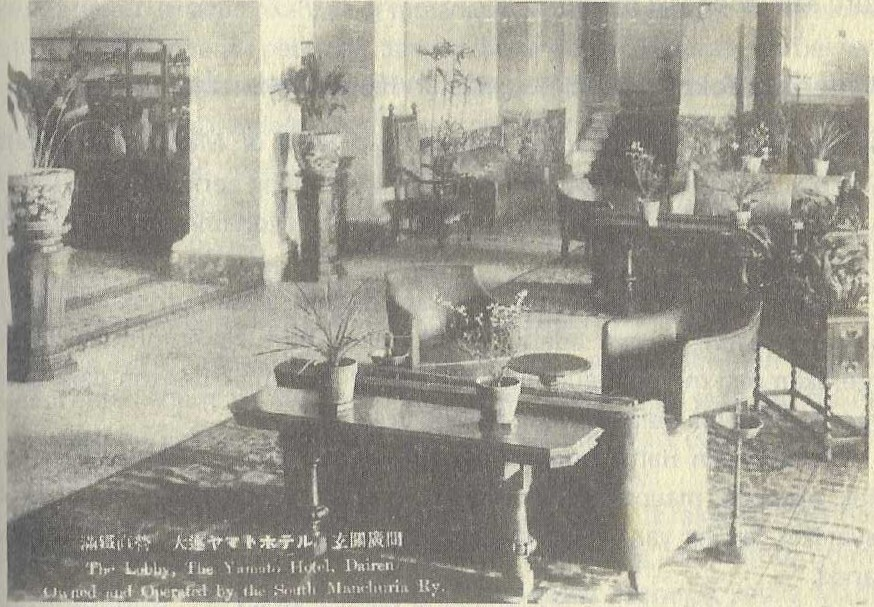
Yamato Hotel in Dalian, lobby, 1934

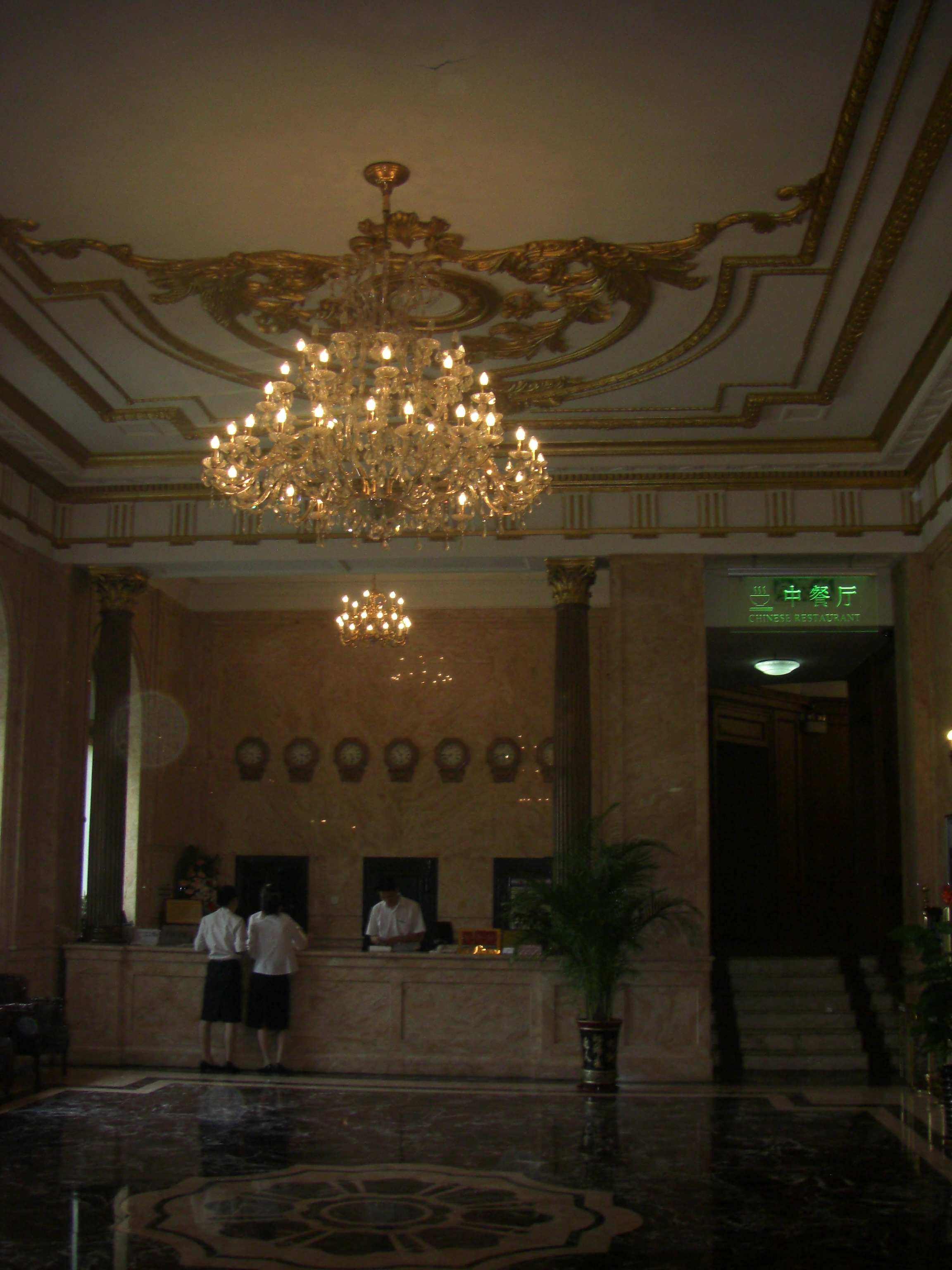
Yamato Hotel in Dalian, lobby, 2009

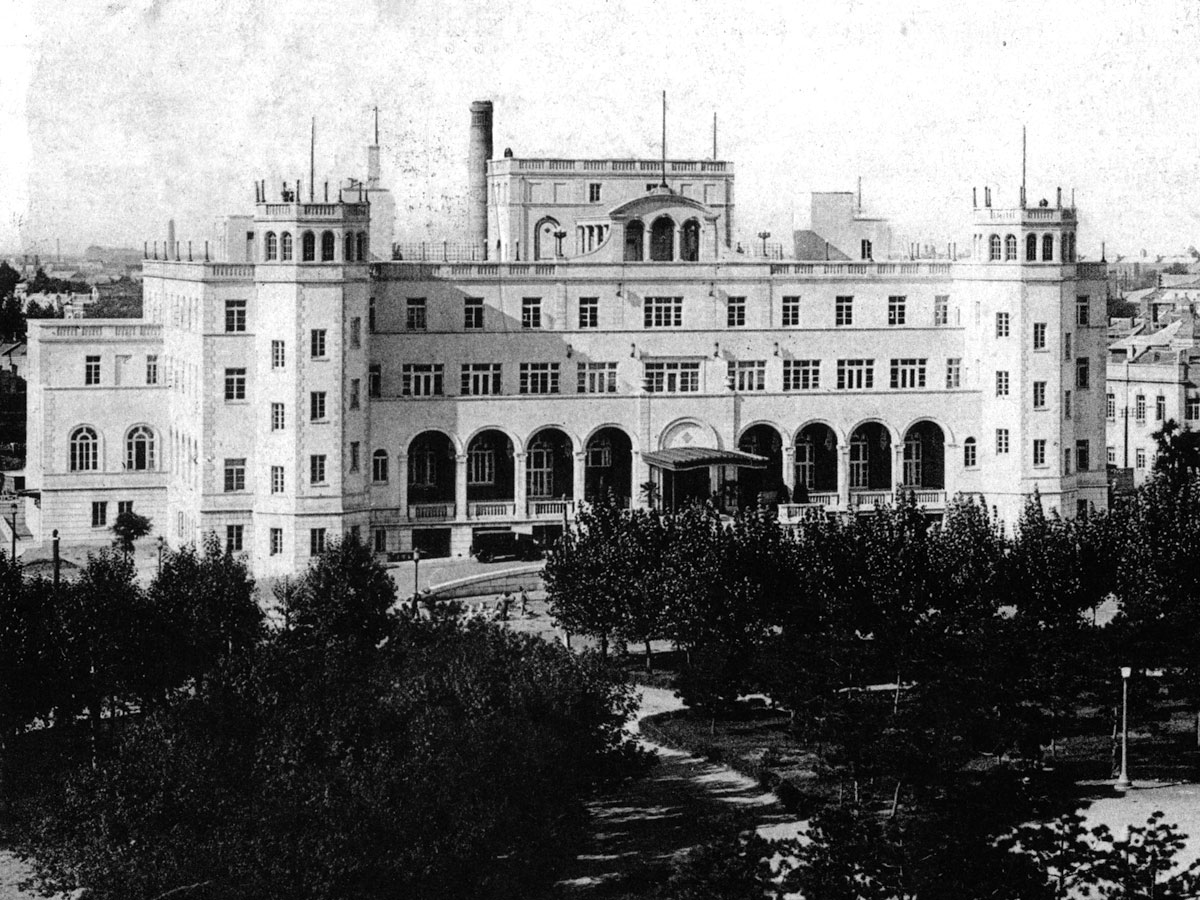
Yamato Hotel in Mukden, 1930s

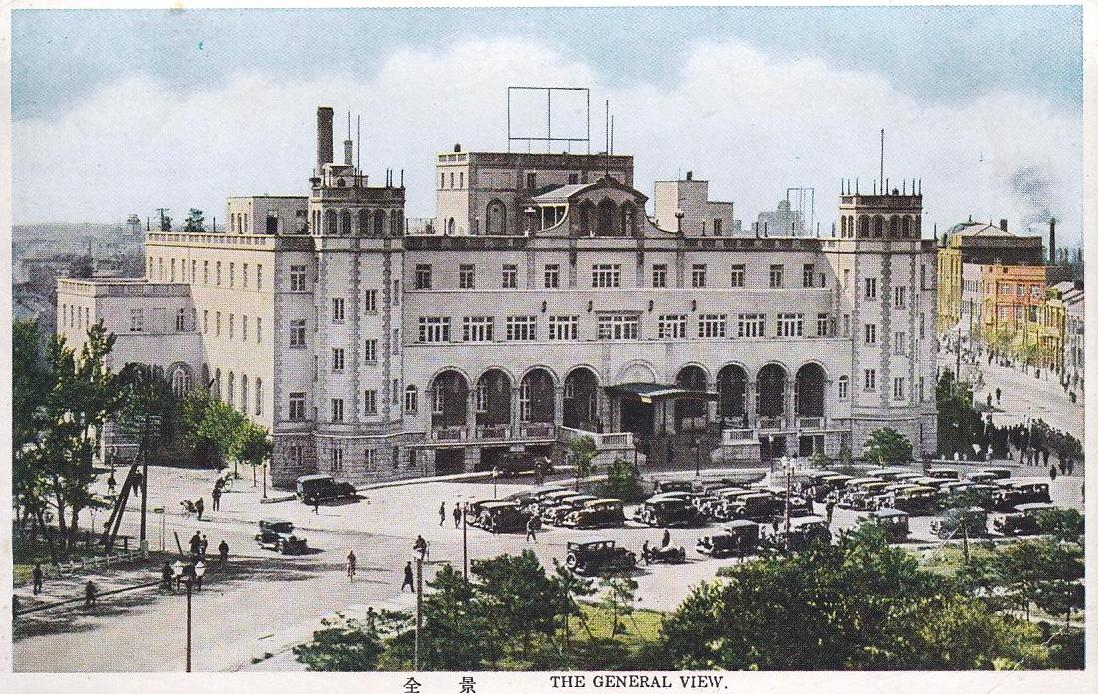
Yamato Hotel in Mukden, 1930s

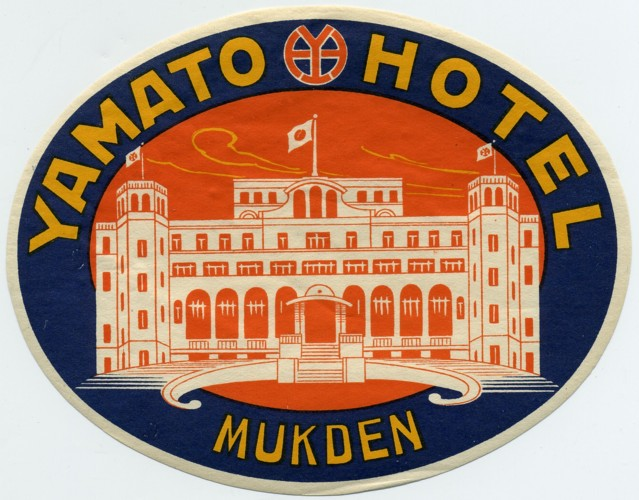
Luggage label from the Yamato Hotel in Mukden, 1930s

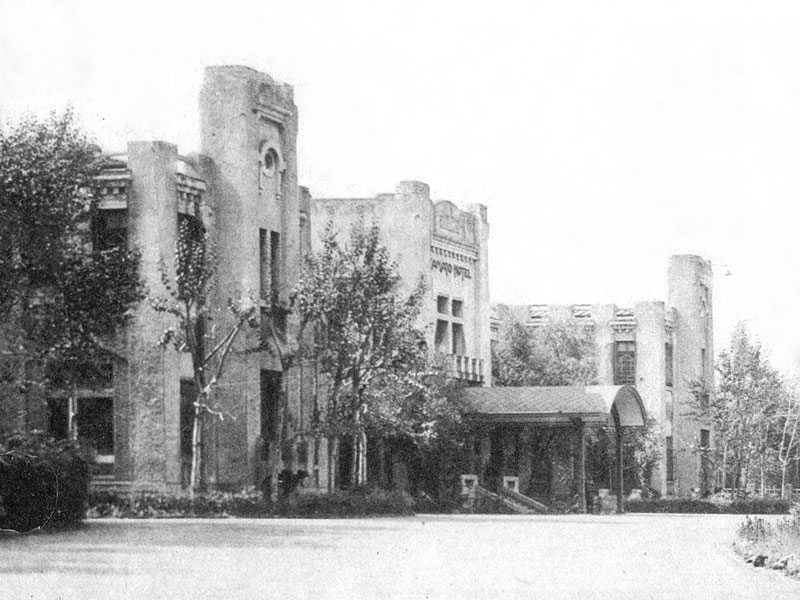
Yamato Hotel in Xinjing

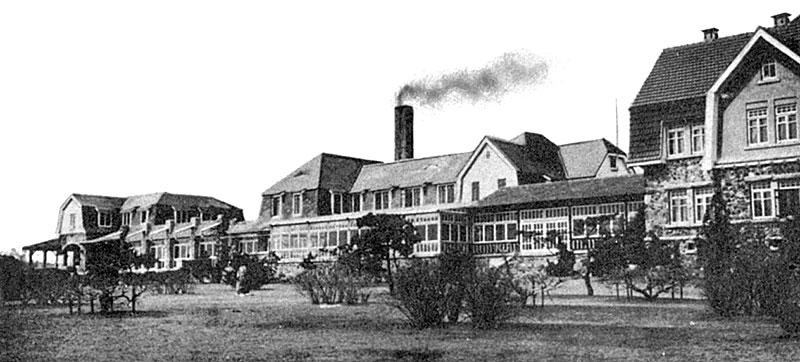
Yamato Hotel at Hoshigaura (星ヶ浦, now Xinghai Square)

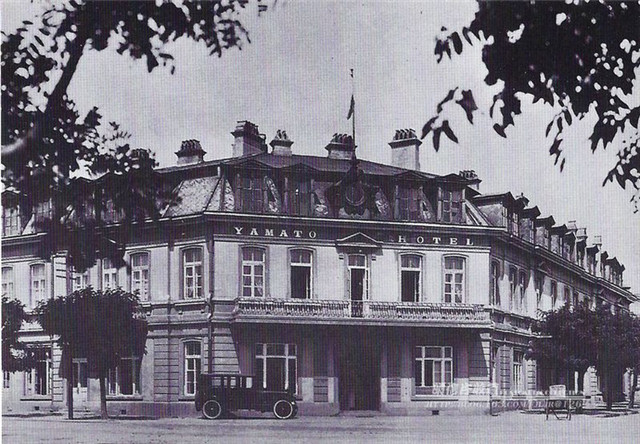
Yamato Hotel in Ryojun (Port Arthur), 1920s

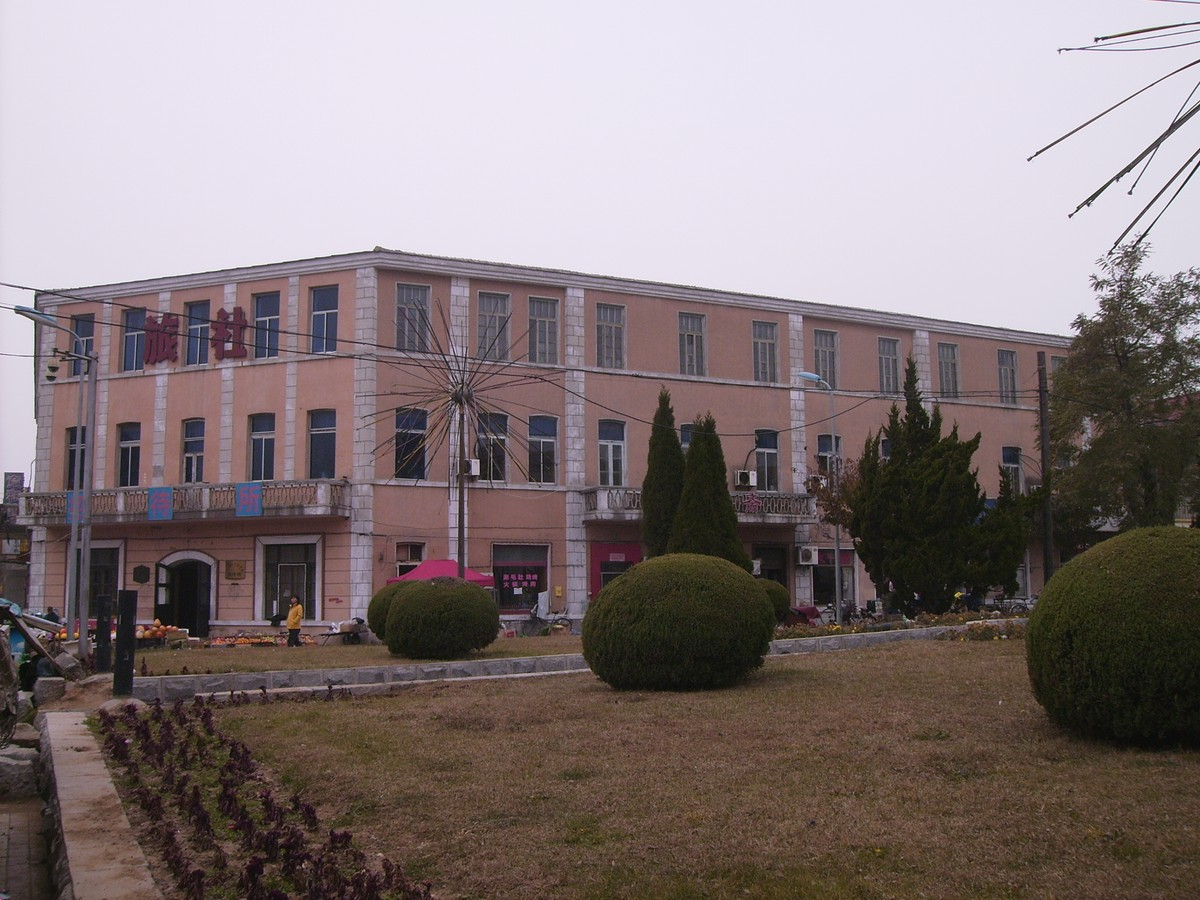
Yamato Hotel in Ryojun (Port Arthur) today

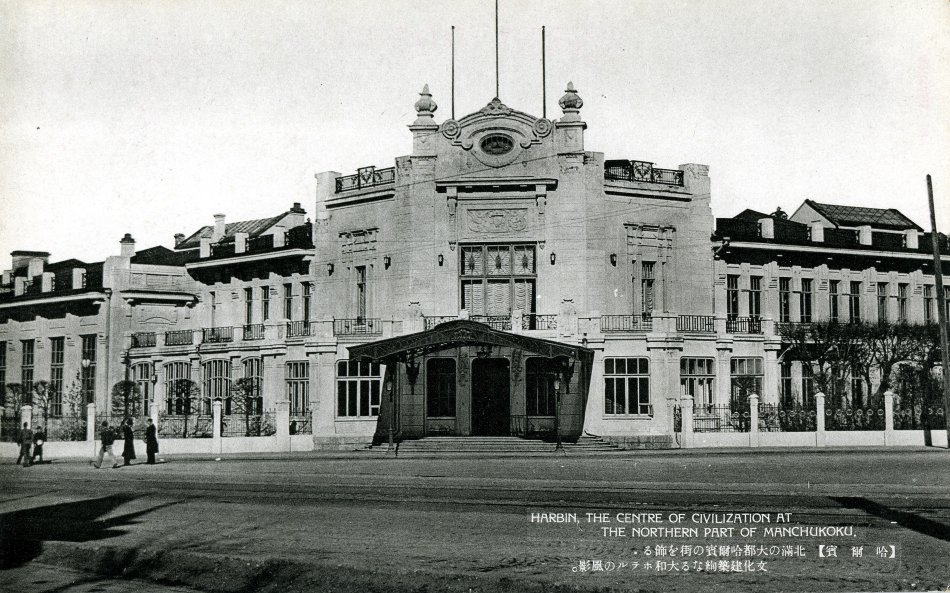
Yamato Hotel in Harbin, 1920s
