= Pungri station =

Railway station in North Korea

P'ungri 풍리
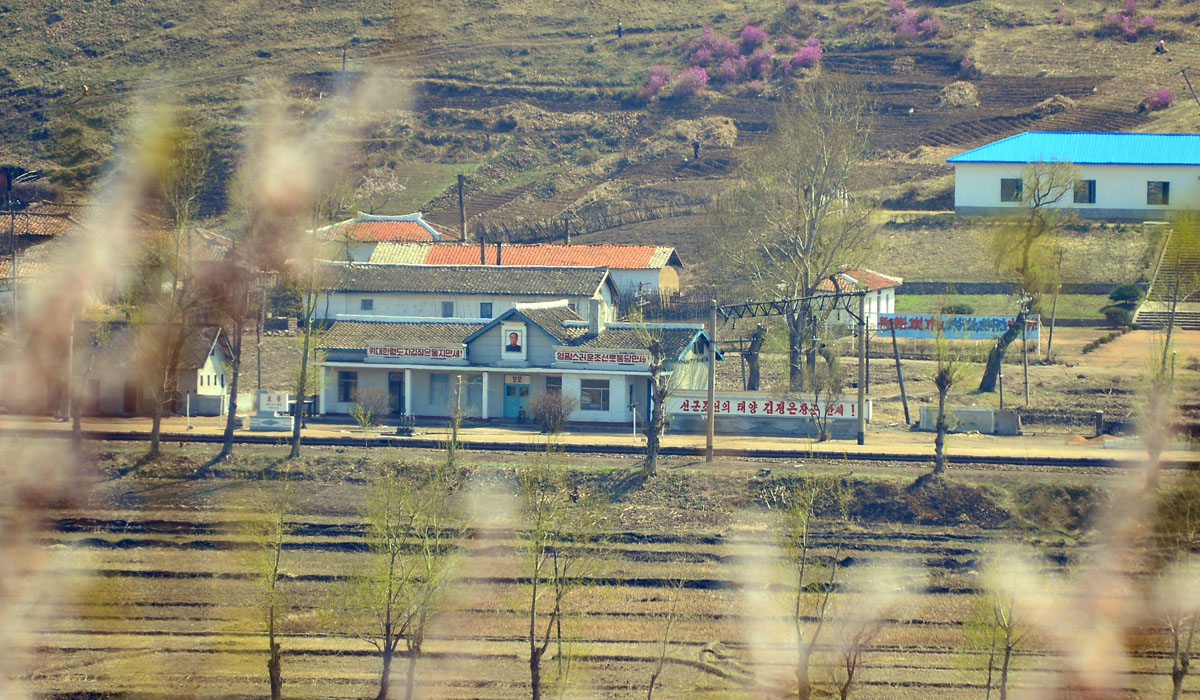
- P'ungri station

Korean name
- Hangul: 풍리역
- Hanja: 豊利驛
- Revised Romanization: Pungri-yeok
- McCune–Reischauer: P'ungri-yŏk

General information
- Location: Onsŏng, North Hamgyŏng; North Korea
- Coordinates: 42.9627°N 129.8929°E
- Owner: Korean State Railway

History
- Opened: 1 November 1932

Services
Preceding station	Korean State Railway	Following station
Onsong towards Rajin	Hambuk Line	Namyang towards Ch'ŏngjin Ch'ŏngnyŏn
Location

P'ungri station is a railway station in Onsŏng county, North Hamgyŏng, North Korea, on the Hambuk Line of the Korean State Railway, which is North Korea's railway.

== History ==
It was opened by the Chosen Government Railway on 1 November 1932, together with the rest of the Unsŏng–P'ungri section of the East Tomun Line.
