= Rajinhang Line =

Railway line in North Korea

Rajin Port Line

Overview
- Native name: 라진항선(羅津港線)
- Status: Operational
- Owner: South Manchuria Railway (1935–1945); Korean State Railway (since 1945)
- Locale: Rasŏn
- Termini: Rajin; Rajinhang
- Stations: 2

Service
- Type: Heavy rail, Freight rail

History
- Opened: 1935

Technical
- Line length: 3.0 km (1.9 mi)
- Number of tracks: Single track
- Track gauge: 1,435 mm (4 ft 8 1/2 in) standard gauge
- Electrification: 3000 V DC Catenary

- Rajinhang Line
- Hangul: 라진항선
- Hanja: 羅津港線
- RR: Rajinhangseon
- MR: Rajinhangsŏn

The Rajinhang Line, or Rajin Port Line, is an electrified 3.0 km (1.9 mi) long railway line of the Korean State Railway in North Korea, connecting Rajin at the junction of the P'yŏngra and Hambuk lines with Rajin Port.

== History ==
The line was opened in 1935 by the South Manchuria Railway as the Najinbudu Line ("Najin Wharf Line", 나진부두선, Najinbudu-sŏn; 羅津埠頭, Rashinfutō-sen). After the end of the Pacific War in 1945 and the subsequent establishment of the DPRK, it was nationalised with all other railways and taken over by the Korean State Railway, and given its current name.

== Route ==
A yellow background in the "Distance" box indicates that section of the line is not electrified.

Distance (km)		Station Name		Former Name		
Total	S2S	Transcribed	Chosŏn'gŭl (Hanja)	Transcribed	Chosŏn'gŭl (Hanja)	Connections
0.0	0.0	Rajin	라진 (羅津)	Najin	나진 (羅津)	Hambuk Line, P'yŏngra Line
3.0	3.0	Rajinhang	라진항 (羅津港)	Najinbudu	나진부두 (羅津埠頭)	
