= Onsong County =

Onsong County 온성군
- County

Korean transcription(s)
  - Hanja: 穩城郡
  - McCune-Reischauer: Onsŏng kun
  - Revised Romanization: Onseong-gun
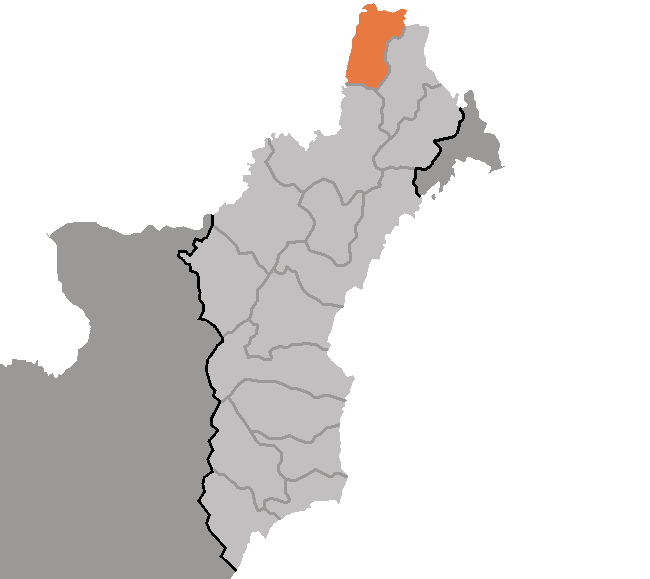
- Map of North Hamgyong showing the location of Onsong
- Country: North Korea
- Province: North Hamgyong Province
- Administrative divisions: 1 ŭp;, 10 workers' districts, 15 ri

Area
  - Total: 430 km^{2} (170 sq mi)

Population (2008 census)
  - Total: 127,893
  - Density: 300/km^{2} (770/sq mi)

Onsŏng is a county (kun) in North Hamgyong Province, North Korea, located near the border with China. The administrative center is the town (ŭp) of Onsong. Onsong is the site of the former Onsong concentration camp, now closed.

== History ==
Onsong was one of the six post/garrisons (Korean: 육진; Hancha: 六鎭) established under the order of Sejong the Great of Joseon (1418–1450) to safeguard his people from the hostile Chinese Ming dynasty and Manchurian/Jurchen nomads living in Manchuria.

== Geography ==
Onsong lies along the Tumen River, which forms the border with China. To the north of Onsong is Jilin Province, China. Onsong also contains the northernmost point in Korea, at 43°0'39″ N. Liangshui (Korean: 량수진; Hancha: 凉水鎮), in Tumen prefecture, is the closest Chinese town across the river.

The land of Onsong is mainly mountainous, although a part is flatland. It has a continental climate, and is the region of Korea with the longest winter, except the Kaema Plateau. The highest peak is Yŏndubong.

== Economy ==
Being mountainous in nature, Onsong is not well suited to agriculture. Ironically, however, it has the highest ratio of rice paddies to dry fields of any district in North Hamgyong Province. Logging is prevalent in the Tumen River basin. Lignite coal is also produced.

== Transportation ==
Onsong is served by roads and railroads. In winter, it is also possible to cross the frozen Tumen River into China.

Onsong has a 4 km long, single overhead bidirectional trolleybus line linking from the railway station to the Wangjaesan Grand Monument, although no trolleybuses are observed on the line since at least 2004. The overhead is nonetheless at least appearing to be in a good condition. The system formerly had two Jipsan 88 trolleybuses, though they were converted from the similar, but unrelated Jipsan 88 bus.

== Administrative divisions ==
Onsŏng County is divided into 1 town ("Ŭp"), 10 workers' districts ("Rodongjagu") and 15 villages ("Ri"):

| | Chosŏn'gŭl | Hancha |
|---|---|---|
| Onsŏng-ŭp | 온성읍 | 穩城邑 |
| Chongsŏng-rodongjagu | 종성로동자구 | 鍾城勞動者區 |
| Chuwŏl-lodongjagu | 주원로동자구 | 周原勞動者區 |
| Ch'angp'yŏng-rodongjagu | 창평로동자구 | 蒼坪勞動者區 |
| Namyang-rodongjagu | 남양로동자구 | 南陽勞動者區 |
| Ont'al-lodongjagu | 온탄로동자구 | 穩炭勞動者區 |
| P'ung'il-lodongjagu | 풍인로동자구 | 豊仁勞動者區 |
| Sambong-rodongjagu | 삼봉로동자구 | 三峰勞動者區 |
| Sanghwa-rodongjagu | 상화로동자구 | 上和勞動者區 |
| Sansŏng-rodongjagu | 산성로동자구 | 山城勞動者區 |
| Tongp'o-rodongjagu | 동포로동자구 | 東浦勞動者區 |
| Chungsal-li | 증산리 | 甑山里 |
| Hasambong-ri | 하삼봉리 | 下三峰里 |
| Hyangdang-ri | 향당리 | 香堂里 |
| Kangal-li | 강안리 | 江岸里 |
| Misal-li | 미산리 | 美山里 |
| P'ungch'ŏl-li | 풍천리 | 豊川里 |
| P'unggye-ri | 풍계리 | 豊溪里 |
| P'ungha-ri | 풍하리 | 豊利里 |
| P'ungsŏ-ri | 풍서리 | 豊西里 |
| Ryongnam-ri | 룡남리 | 龍南里 |
| Sesŏl-li | 세선리 | 世仙里 |
| Turubong-ri | 두루봉리 | 頭魯峯里 |
| Un'am-ri | 운암리 | 雲岩里 |
| Wangjaesal-li | 왕재산리 | 王在山里 |
| Yŏnggang-ri | 영강리 | 永江里 |

== Notable personalities ==
- Shin Rip, the prefect of Onsong before the Imjin War
- Hyok Kang, the author of the autobiographical This is Paradise!: My North Korean Childhood.

O jung hup, korean Partisan
