= Tumen, Jilin =

Tumen 图们市 · 도문시
- County-level city
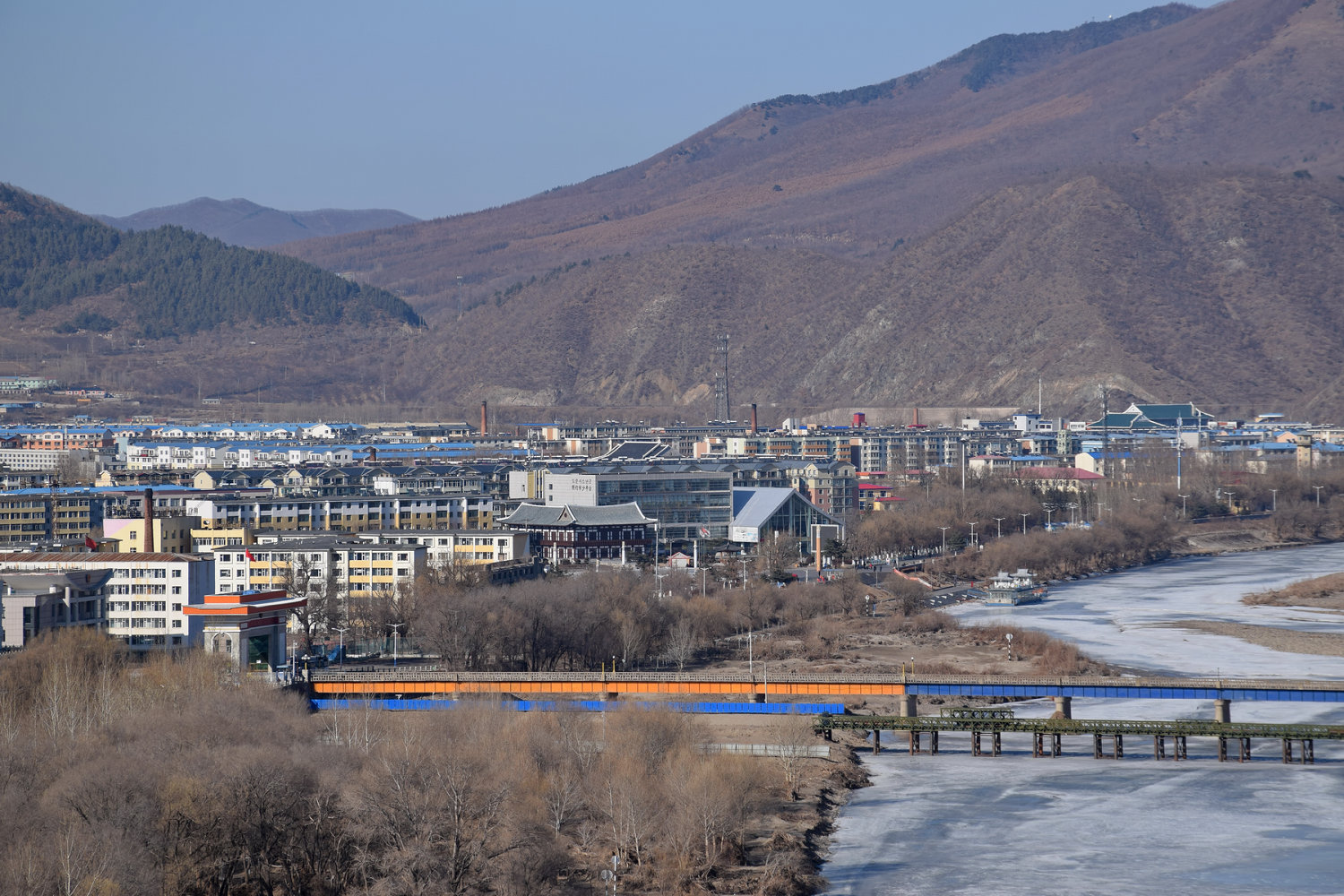
- Tumen and the Tumen River

- Location in Jilin province Tumen (China)
- Coordinates: 42°58′N 129°51′E
- Country: People's Republic of China
- Province: Jilin
- Prefecture: Yanbian
- Seat: Xiangshang Subdistrict

Area
  - County-level city: 1,142.7 km^{2} (441.2 sq mi)
  - Urban: 15.00 km^{2} (5.79 sq mi)
- Elevation: 97 m (318 ft)

Population (2017)
  - County-level city: 121,000
  - Density: 106/km^{2} (274/sq mi)
  - Urban: 84,700
- Time zone: UTC+8 (China Standard)
- Area code: 133100

Tumen, Jilin
- Simplified Chinese: 图们市
- Traditional Chinese: 圖們市
Transcriptions
Standard Mandarin
- Hanyu Pinyin: Túmén Shì

Chinese Korean name
- Chosŏn'gŭl: 도문시
Transcriptions
- Revised Romanization: Domun-si
- McCune–Reischauer: Tomun-si

South Korean name
- Hangul: 투먼 시
Transcriptions
- Revised Romanization: Tumeon Si
- McCune–Reischauer: T'umŏn Si

Tumen (simplified Chinese: 图们; traditional Chinese: 圖們; pinyin: Túmén; Chosŏn'gŭl: 도문; Hangul: 투먼) is a county-level city in Yanbian Korean Autonomous Prefecture, eastern Jilin province, Northeast China. Of its 136,000 inhabitants, approximately 78,000 (or 57%) are of Korean descent. The two official languages are Chinese and Korean. Tumen is separated from Namyang of North Hamgyong province of North Korea by the Tumen River. Due to this proximity, many North Koreans escaping North Korea pass through Tumen. Tumen is also the location of a large detention center for captured North Koreans awaiting deportation. Tumen has two major food markets, the South Market and the North Market, where most of the residents purchase their food. Packaged foods and meats are usually sold inside the building, and vegetables are sold outside. There are six elementary schools, with three Korean schools, and three Chinese schools.

A riverfront promenade in the city has restaurants where patrons can gaze across the river into North Korea.

== Administrative divisions ==
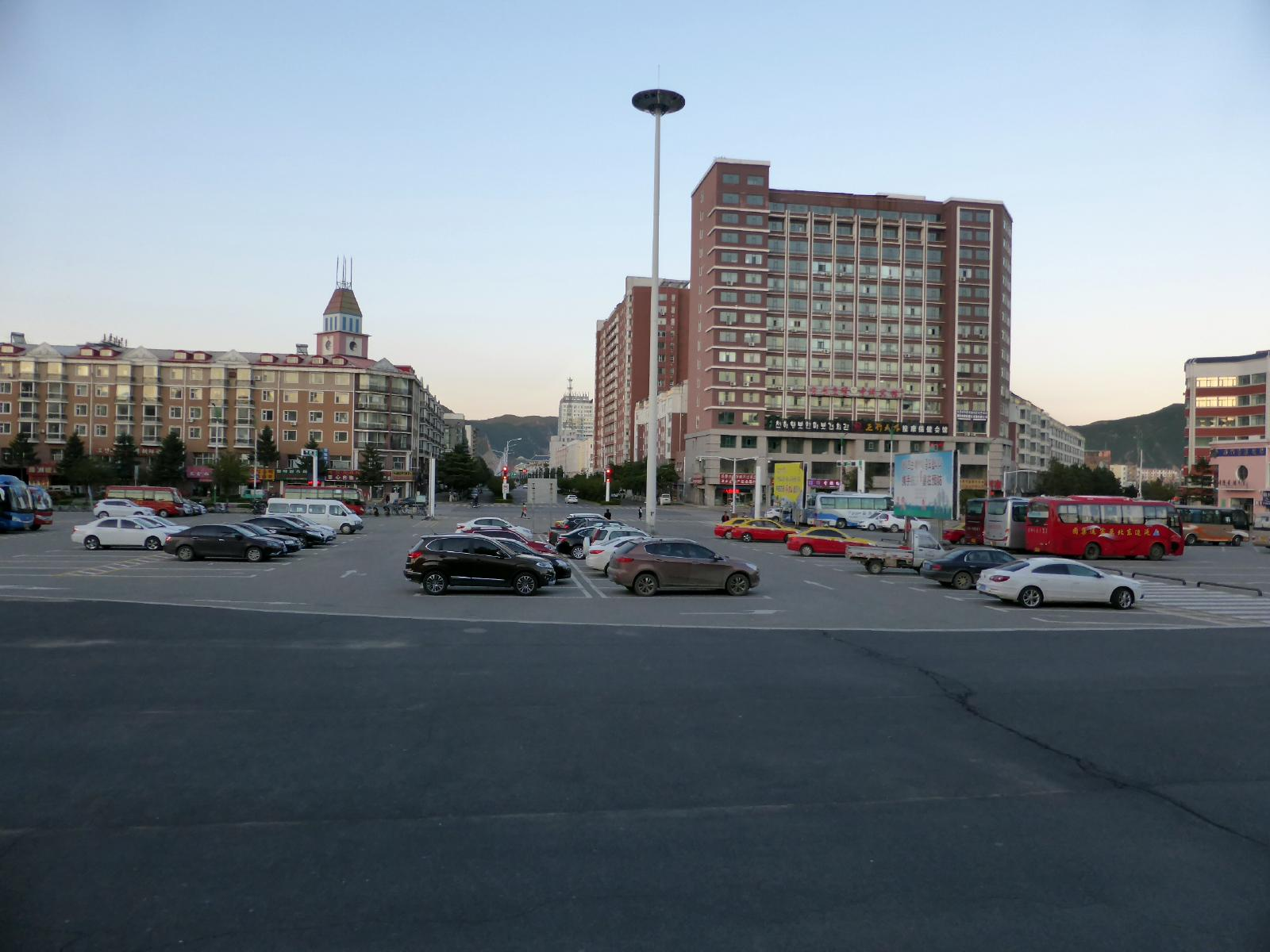
Square in front of Tumen railway station, 2018

Tumen has three subdistricts and four towns.

Subdistricts:

- Xiangshang Subdistrict (向上街道 / 향상가도)
- Xinhua Subdistrict (新华街道 / 신화가도)
- Yuegong Subdistrict (月宫街道 / 월궁가도)

Towns:

- Yueqing (月晴镇 / 월청진)
- Shixian (石峴镇 / 석현진)
- Chang'an (长安镇 / 장안진)
- Liangshui (凉水镇 / 량수진)

== Climate ==
Climate data for Tumen, elevation 143 m (469 ft), (1991–2020 normals, extremes 1981–present)
Month	Jan	Feb	Mar	Apr	May	Jun	Jul	Aug	Sep	Oct	Nov	Dec	Year
Record high °C (°F)	8.7 (47.7)	11.3 (52.3)	20.8 (69.4)	33.3 (91.9)	33.7 (92.7)	37.4 (99.3)	37.7 (99.9)	36.5 (97.7)	32.2 (90.0)	28.1 (82.6)	19.3 (66.7)	10.1 (50.2)	37.7 (99.9)
Mean daily maximum °C (°F)	−5.9 (21.4)	−1.2 (29.8)	5.8 (42.4)	14.7 (58.5)	20.4 (68.7)	23.6 (74.5)	26.2 (79.2)	26.6 (79.9)	22.6 (72.7)	15.1 (59.2)	4.1 (39.4)	−4.2 (24.4)	12.3 (54.2)
Daily mean °C (°F)	−11.7 (10.9)	−7.4 (18.7)	−0.2 (31.6)	7.9 (46.2)	13.5 (56.3)	17.7 (63.9)	21.2 (70.2)	21.5 (70.7)	15.9 (60.6)	8.3 (46.9)	−1.5 (29.3)	−9.5 (14.9)	6.3 (43.4)
Mean daily minimum °C (°F)	−16.6 (2.1)	−13.0 (8.6)	−5.8 (21.6)	1.5 (34.7)	7.7 (45.9)	13.2 (55.8)	17.5 (63.5)	17.7 (63.9)	10.8 (51.4)	2.5 (36.5)	−6.2 (20.8)	−14.0 (6.8)	1.3 (34.3)
Record low °C (°F)	−29.2 (−20.6)	−26.7 (−16.1)	−20.3 (−4.5)	−9.1 (15.6)	−1.3 (29.7)	5.7 (42.3)	10.0 (50.0)	7.1 (44.8)	−1.1 (30.0)	−11.5 (11.3)	−20.2 (−4.4)	−26.2 (−15.2)	−29.2 (−20.6)
Average precipitation mm (inches)	6.5 (0.26)	6.6 (0.26)	12.9 (0.51)	31.0 (1.22)	68.1 (2.68)	81.0 (3.19)	128.7 (5.07)	111.6 (4.39)	65.0 (2.56)	32.6 (1.28)	20.1 (0.79)	7.6 (0.30)	571.7 (22.51)
Average precipitation days (≥ 0.1 mm)	2.8	3.3	5.6	8.5	13.9	14.2	14.4	14.1	9.4	6.5	6.1	4.4	103.2
Average snowy days	4.2	4.9	6.4	2.6	0.1	0	0	0	0	1.1	5.7	5.8	30.8
Average relative humidity (%)	56	53	52	53	66	78	83	82	76	63	59	58	65
Mean monthly sunshine hours	193.3	200.0	228.6	213.9	212.0	186.9	163.4	172.7	202.4	202.0	166.1	171.3	2,312.6
Percentage possible sunshine	66	67	62	53	47	41	35	40	55	60	57	61	54
Source: China Meteorological Administration All-time Oct extreme

== See also ==
- Tumen Border Bridge
