= Sonbong station =

Railway station in Rason, North Korea

Sŏnbong 선봉

Korean name
- Hangul: 선봉역
- Hanja: 先鋒驛
- Revised Romanization: Seonbong-yeok
- McCune–Reischauer: Sŏnbong-yŏk

General information
- Location: Sŏnbong-ŭp, Sŏnbong, Rasŏn T'ŭkpyŏlsi, North Hamgyŏng; North Korea
- Coordinates: 42.3527°N 130.3794°E
- Owner: Korean State Railway
- Line: Hambuk Line

History
- Opened: 16 November 1929
- Former names: Unggi

Services
Preceding station	Korean State Railway	Following station
Tongsŏnbong towards Rajin	Hambuk Line	Kwan'gok towards Ch'ŏngjin Ch'ŏngnyŏn
Sŭngri Terminus	Sŭngri Line	Terminus
Location

Sŏnbong station is a railway station in Sŏnbong-ŭp, Sŏnbong, Rason Special City, North Hamgyŏng province, North Korea on the Hambuk Line of the Korean State Railway; it is also the starting point of the Sŭngri branch to Sŭngri.

The station was opened on 16 November 1929 by the Chosen Government Railway (Sentetsu) at the same time as the mainline from Unggi (now Sŏnbong) to Sinasan.
