= Koreans in China =

Ethnic group

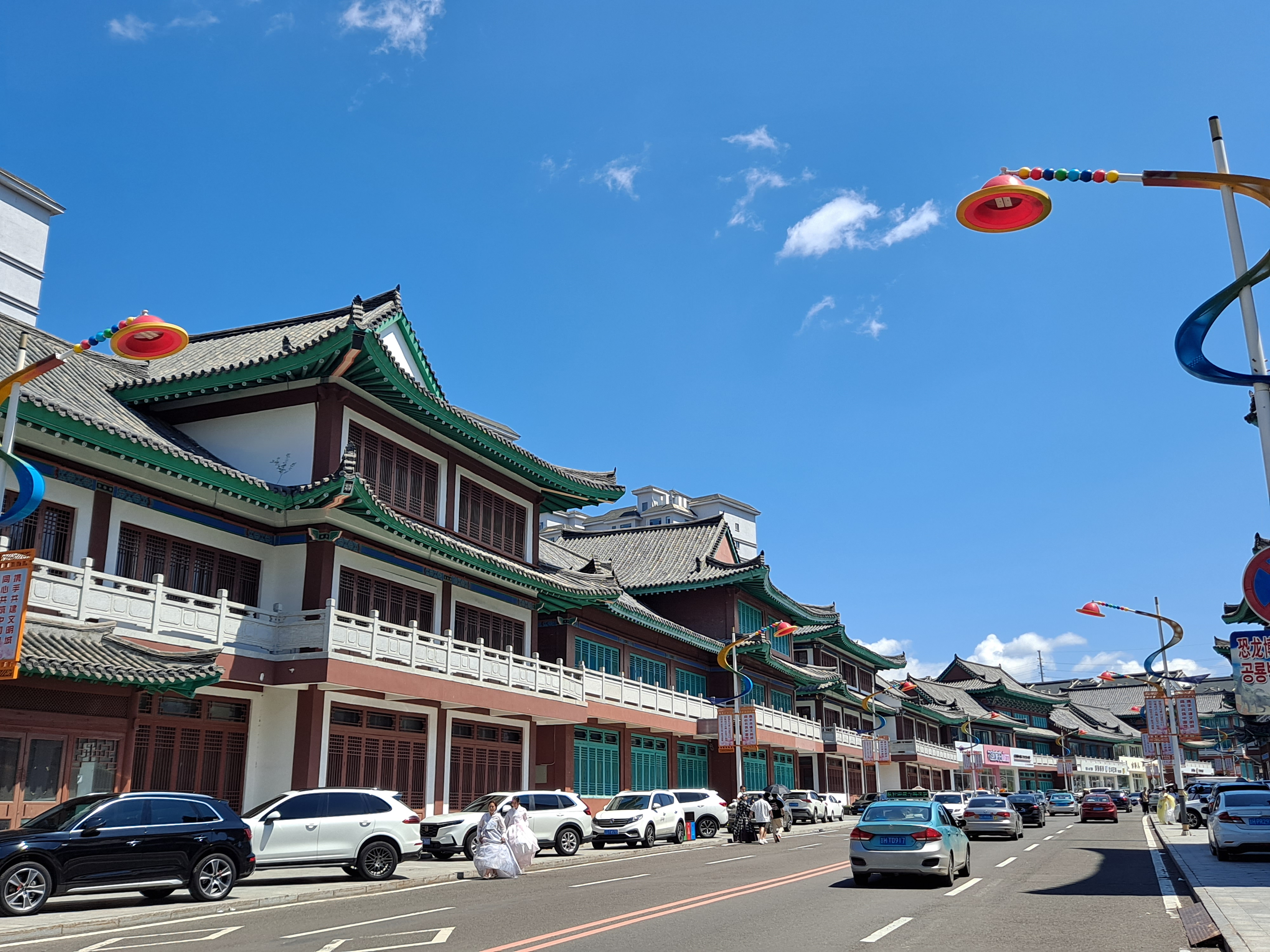
- Sino-Korean Folk Park in Yanbian Korean Autonomous Prefecture

Total population
- All Koreans: 2,109,727
- Chaoxianzu: 1,702,479–1,893,763

Regions with significant populations
- Jilin, Heilongjiang, Liaoning, Shandong peninsula, Beijing and other Chinese cities

Languages
- Korean; Standard Chinese

Religion
- Buddhism · Christianity

Koreans in China include both ethnic Koreans with Chinese citizenship and foreign residents living in China such as South Koreans (Chinese: 在华韩国人·韩裔), North Koreans (在华朝鲜人·朝鲜裔), and other overseas Koreans. For this reason, ethnic Koreans with Chinese citizenship are termed Korean Chinese, (Note: South Koreans often use the term 한국계 중국인; 韓國系中國人; lit. 'Chinese people of Korean descent') Joseonjok, or Chosŏnjok (Korean: 조선족; Hancha: 朝鮮族), and their official name in China is Chaoxianzu (朝鲜族; Cháoxiǎnzú; 'Joseon ethnic group'). Korean Chinese are the 13th largest ethnic minority group in China. They form a diasporic community with cultural ties to the Korean Peninsula across generations, including among individuals who have never visited Korea.

Most native Korean Chinese live in Northeast China. Significant populations can also be found in Heilongjiang and Inner Mongolia, with a sizable expatriate community in Shanghai and Shandong, across the Yellow Sea. According to the South Korean government, the combined population of Koreans with Chinese nationality, South Korean, and North Korean expatriates in China was 2,109,727 in 2023.

According to the Chinese government's 2020 Hukou census, the total population of ethnic Korean Chinese was 1,702,479 at that time. High levels of emigration to the Republic of Korea for better economic and work opportunities have contributed to a decrease in their residential numbers in China. Conversely, it is estimated that 42% (approximately 708,000) of these Korean Chinese individuals now reside in Korea while maintaining their Chinese nationality. Koreans in China are the largest or second-largest ethnic Korean population living outside of the Korean Peninsula, after Korean Americans.

Among the 56 ethnic groups recognized by the Chinese government, Koreans have the highest literacy and college enrollment rates and the lowest birth rate.

== Terminology ==
In South Korea, the terminology describing this demographic has evolved in recent years to adopt a more inclusive tone. Government regulations from 2004 prescribe the use of the terms "jaeoe dongpo" (Korean: 재외동포; Hanja: 在外同胞; lit. 'compatriots residing abroad') and "jungguk dongpo" (Korean: 중국동포; Hanja: 中國同胞; lit. 'compatriots in China'). The term "Jaejung Hanin" (Korean: 재중한인; Hanja: 在中韓人; lit. 'Koreans in China') is considered the most appropriate descriptor for Koreans in China without taking nationality into account.

Additionally, the term "joseon-jok" (Korean: 조선족; Hanja: 朝鮮族; lit. 'Joseon ethnicity') is often used to refer to Koreans in China who have Chinese nationality. This terminology parallels "Chaoxianzu," which is predominantly utilized in mainland China and stands as the official designation for this ethnic minority, as stipulated by the Chinese government.

== History ==
Due to the geographic proximity between China and the Korean Peninsula, population migration has occurred frequently throughout history. However, most early ethnic Koreans in China were assimilated into Han Chinese, Manchu, and Mongol populations. Consequently, the vast majority of today's ethnic Koreans in China are descendants of those who arrived during or after the late Qing Dynasty.

=== Early history ===
After the conclusion of the Goguryeo–Tang War (CE 645 – 668), Tang forces relocated over 200,000 prisoners from Goguryeo to the Chinese capital, Chang'an. During the 8th and 9th centuries of the Silla period, Korean trading quarters involved in commerce with China existed along the coast of Shandong Peninsula and in commercial towns on the Grand Canal, specifically between the borders of Henan and Shandong and the lower Yangtze River. These Koreans imported exotic products that were already foreign to China back into Korea (Silla). Like other foreign traders, Koreans were restricted to designated quarters in cities such as Dengzhou, Yangzhou, and Lianshui in Huai'an (Chuzhou), with special interpreters and managers. However, Korean traders mostly avoided southern China.

According to the records of the History of Liao (Chinese: 遼史), the Khitans set up Samhan county in Zhongjing Circuit (中京道), one of the five Liao 'circuits', to settle prisoners of war after the Goryeo–Khitan War. In the Yuan dynasty, Koreans were included in the third class, as 'Han people,' along with Northern Chinese, Khitans, and Jurchens. Korean settlements in the Yuan Dynasty were mostly war-related. In 1233, former Goryeo commander Hong Pok-wŏn and his followers moved to the present-day Liaoyang and Shenyang areas of Liaoning Province in Northeast China after his surrender during the Mongol invasions of Korea. He was offered an administrator position to take charge of the Korean population there, and in the following years, another ten thousand Goryeo households were brought under his administration. In 1266, Wang Jun (王綧), a member of the Goryeo royal family, was sent to the Mongol Empire as a hostage, accompanied by 2,000 Goryeo households who settled in present-day Shenyang.

The Korean population in China surged during the Ming dynasty. According to the Chronicles of Liaodong (遼東志), Koreans and Jurchens accounted for 30% of the total local population in Liaodong. In 1386, the Ming government established the Dongningwei (東寧衛) and Guangningwei (廣寧衛) to settle the growing Korean population. Between the mid-15th and early 16th centuries, the Liaodong Peninsula experienced a peaceful and prosperous era. Favorable policies were carried out for ethnic minorities in areas like Dongningwei (東寧衛). Many Koreans moved from the Korean Peninsula to Northeast China to take advantage of such policies. However, as the power of the Jianzhou Jurchens grew, Koreans began to move out of Dongningwei. By 1537, the Korean population in Dongningwei had decreased by 60 percent.

As the Jurchens (known as Manchus after 1635) established the Later Jin (後金), military clashes between Jurchens and Koreans increased. During the two Jurchen invasions of the Korean Peninsula, the Jurchens captured large numbers of Korean people. Most were drafted as soldiers into the Eight Banners or sold to wealthy Jurchens as farm laborers or servants. Most of the captured Koreans in the early Qing dynasty were forcibly converted to Manchu or other ethnicities and lost their ethnic identities. However, about 2,000 descendants of these captured Koreans in Qinglong Manchu Autonomous County (Hebei province) and Gaizhou and Benxi County (Liaoning Province) have kept their Korean identity. (Note: The ancestors of the Koreans in Qinglong Manchu Autonomous County, Hebei province were drafted into the "Bordered White Banner" after capture by Jurchens in the early Qing Dynasty during war, and then followed the Manchus to move to Beijing. They were banished to Changli County after their participation in a coup during Shunzhi Emperor's rule and then exiled. Their descendants later moved to their current location. The ancestors of the Koreans in Gaizhou Liaoning Province were forced to become farm laborers on Nurhaci's farm, and then Prince Zhuang's farm. The ancestors of the Koreans in Benxi County in Liaoning Province became Nurhaci's first son Cuyen's farm labors after capture by Jurchens during wars.) In 1982, during the third national population census of China, these 2,000 ethnic Koreans had their Korean ethnicity restored per their requests, in accordance with newly issued Chinese government policy.

=== Late Qing era ===
==== Migration Ban ====
In 1677, Manchus sealed the area north of Baekdu Mountain and the Yalu and Tumen Rivers as a conservation area of their ancestors' birthplace, and prohibited Koreans and people of other non-Manchu ethnicities from entering the area. The Joseon rulers were also forced by the Qing authorities to implement harsh penalties to prevent Koreans from entering the sealed areas. These Koreans were mostly seasonal or even illegal migrants because the Manchu leaders of the Qing Dynasty considered the Northeast, especially the Yanbian area, their sacred ancestral homeland and strictly forbade Han and other non-Manchu peoples from disturbing the region. As a result, the areas became deserted with no human settlement. But there were still Koreans living nearby who took the risk to collect ginseng, hunt animals, or cultivate agricultural products in the prohibited area. In 1740, the Qianlong Emperor extended the ban to the whole of Manchuria.

==== Ban Lifted ====
During the second half of the nineteenth century, Northeast China increasingly became depopulated after 200 years of Manchus' closure to the region. The Russian Empire meanwhile seized the opportunity to encroach on this region. In 1860, the Qing government was forced to sign the Convention of Peking and ceded more than 1 million square kilometers to the Russians. Pressed by the situation, the Qing government lifted the ban on Northeast China in 1860 and lifted the ban on the Yalu River and Tumen River area in 1875 and 1881 respectively.

During the years between 1860 and 1870, several unprecedented natural disasters struck the northern part of the Korean Peninsula. Meanwhile, peasant revolts in the south spread to the north. Large numbers of Korean refugees moved to the north banks of the Tumen and Yalu rivers during those turbulent times. In 1879, there were 8722 Korean households living in 28 villages in Tonghua, Huairen, Kuandian, Xinbin areas, with a total population of more than 37,000. In 1881, the Qing government established a special bureau to recruit farmers to cultivate the land and allocated the 700 by 45-square-kilometer area north of the Tumen River as the special farming areas for Korean farmers.

The Qing government strengthened the management of Korean emigrants during the start of the 20th century. Korean emigrants were able to obtain land ownership if they were willing to adopt the dress codes required by the Manchu government, such as the Queue hairstyle, and pay taxes to the Qing government. However, most of the Korean emigrants considered that official dress codes were a discriminatory policy of assimilation.

In 1881, numbers of ethnic Koreans in Yanbian were less than 10,000. By 1910, the number of Korean migrants in China reached about 260,000, with around 100,000 of them living in the current-day Yanbian Korean Autonomous Prefecture.

==== Development of paddy fields in Northeast China ====
The development of paddy fields in Northeast China during the modern era was related to rice cultivation by Korean emigrants. Korean emigrants attempted to cultivate rice in the Hun River valley as early as 1848. The experiment by Korean farmers in the Dandong region was successful in 1861. In 1875, Korean farmers also succeeded in cultivating rice in the wetland of Huanren region in Liaoning province. The cultivation of rice in Yanbian region began in 1877. The growth of paddy fields brings the further development of irrigation projects in Northeast China by Korean farmers, who built numerous watering canals to irrigate paddy fields. In June 1906, 14 Korean farmers built the earliest irrigation system in Yanbian. The total length of canals built exceeded 1.3 kilometer, irrigating 33 hectare of paddy fields.

On 3 March 1914, the newly established Republic of China issued a decree aimed to encourage land development in Northeastern China. In the same year, the water bureau of the Mukden province began to recruit Korean emigrants to use the water from Hun River to develop paddy fields near Mukden. In 1916, the local government of Jilin Province submitted a paddy field farming specifications document of a Korean immigrant farmer to the central Agriculture and Business Administration. After receiving the administration's approval, Jinlin Province started to promote rice production. Han Chinese farmer began to hire Korean emigrants to learn how to grow rice. In 1917, Korean farmers in Muling solved the problem of how to grow rice in regions with short frost-free period. Rice farming thereafter quickly expanded to the further north region of Mudan River, Muling River and Mayi River basins.

Between 1921 and 1928, the total areas of paddy fields in Northeast China increased from 48,000 hectare to 125,000 hectares, more than 80% of these rice fields was developed or cultivated by Korean farmers. In 1933, Korean farmers succeeded in growing rice in Aihui and Xunke area along Amur River, breaking the world record of growing rice north of the 50th parallel north. In 1934, Korean population accounted for only 3.3% of Northeast China's total population, but produced 90.1% of the rice outputs there.

=== Japanese occupation ===
Number of Korean expatriates in Manchukuo, 1945. At the end of WWII, there were roughly 2.16 million Koreans in China, and 700 thousand of them went back after Korea was freed from Japanese rule

After the Japanese occupation of Korea in 1910, thousands of Koreans fled to Northeast China and other regions of China to escape Japanese rule. Many Korean independence movement activists and organizations established bases or military training schools in Northeast China and move Korean people there in an organized way. In 1919, after the Japanese crackdown on March 1st Movement, Korean migration to China reached a peak. In 1920, the total number of Koreans in Northeast China exceeded 457,400.

During 1910–1934, cadastral land surveys and rice production promotion plans carried out by Governor-General of Korea forced thousands of disadvantaged Korean farmers to lose their land ownership or go to bankruptcy. Since there were no large enough urban industry to absorb these redundant rural population, the Japanese started to migrate these Korean farmers to Northeast China. At the same time, the newly established Republic of China was promoting land developments in Northeast China. This offered a favorable condition for the Japanese population migration policy. After the Chinese government issued the national wild land development decree on 3 March 1914, the water bureau of Mukden Province began to hire Korean emigrants to develop paddy fields near Mukden using the water from Hun River. Since Korean farmers had succeeded in growing rice in Northeast China in large scale and the price of rice in Japan kept climbing every year, the Japanese started to increase their paddy fields in Northeast China each year and hire Korean emigrants to grow rice.

The Fengtian clique in Northeast China maintained a complicated relationship with the Japanese. They sometimes cooperated with the Japanese and sometimes were at odds with them. To fight for the control of Korean emigrants, the Fengtian clique attempted to persuade or force Korean emigrants to become naturalized citizens of China. But most Korean emigrants considered such policies as Chinese authority's attempt to assimilate them into Han Chinese. In September 1930, realizing that Korean emigrants had little trust in Chinese governments, the Chairman of Jinlin Province Zhang Zuoxiang instead carried out policies to encourage Korean emigrants to become naturalized. To prevent the Japanese from using Korean emigrants as a tool of infiltration into Northeast China, the Chinese government also tried to put Korean immigrants' schools into its own national education system, increasing investments on Korean schools annually to sever the Japanese influence on Korean emigrants. In 1921, Jinlin province quadrupled its annual investments on local Korean schools to repair the damages during the Japanese massacre of Koreans (間島慘變) in October 1920. As the Japanese often used the excuse of protecting Korean emigrants to enlarge their sphere of influence in Northeast China, the views of Chinese government and people towards Korean emigrants changed after the mid of 1920, especially after the exposure of Tanaka Memorial and the Wanpaoshan Incident. Korean emigrants used to be considered as independent activists in China, but now they were generally considered as the vanguard of Japanese invasion. Relationship between local Chinese and Korean emigrants became tense. After the Chinese government signed the treaty with the Japanese government on 11 June 1925 to assist the Japanese get rid of Korean independent activists in Northeast China, the Fengtian clique began to use this treaty to expel and persecute Korean emigrants and began to take back the farm lands cultivated by non-naturalized Korean emigrants or put on more restrictions. Naturalized Korean emigrants, however, continue to have the rights to own farm lands.

Under these circumstances, Korean emigrants in Northeast China began to have the consensus of becoming naturalized and actively seeking local autonomy. Many anti-Japanese Korean organizations took measures to protect Korean emigrants and negotiated local Chinese governments into making concessions or acquiescence. In 1928, Zhang Xueliang replaced the Beiyang government flag in Northeast China with Republic of China's flag, after the Huanggutun incident. Many Korean independent organizations seized this good opportunity to encourage Korean emigrants in Northeast China to apply for Chinese citizenship. On 10 September 1928, Korean emigrants in Northeast China established the Korean autonomy organization "Korean Fellow Association" (韓橋同鄕會). In April, the leader of Korean Fellow Association Cui Dongwu went to Nanjing and hold negotiations with the Nationalist government on various issues about Korean emigrants' naturalization and autonomy. These negotiations helped to facilitate the naturalization process for Korean emigrants, but failed in establishing Korean autonomy.

In 1931, Japan staged the Mukden Incident and invaded Northeast China by force, then established a puppet state called Manchukuo. On 14 September 1936, the Japanese set up a special organization (滿鮮拓殖會社) and began to migrate Korean farmers to Northeast China in a planned systemic way.

While the overall number of Koreans in China was increasing, a significant number of Koreans left China in the 1920s, with the ratio of Korean repatriates from Manchuria reaching 35 percent between 1917 and 1928. Around 93% of Koreans reported initially moving to China to escape economic hardship, but when they arrived, they often faced further difficulties, such as exploitation from Chinese landowners and repression from the Japanese. This frustration was captured in popular cultural works such as movie "Across the Tumen River" (1928) and Kim Tong-in's popular essay "Red Mountain" (1932).

The 1930s saw the largest increase in Korean migrants, with the population growing by approximately 74%, exceeding a million across China by 1938. In 1945, when Japan surrendered at the end of World War II, there were more than 2.16 million Korean emigrants living in Northeast China. Among them, about 700,000 returned to Korea after the end of World War II. In 1947, the number of Korean emigrants decreased to 1.4 million, most of them living in the communist party controlled areas, only less than 100,000 living in the Kuomintang-controlled areas.

==== Anti-Japanese fights ====
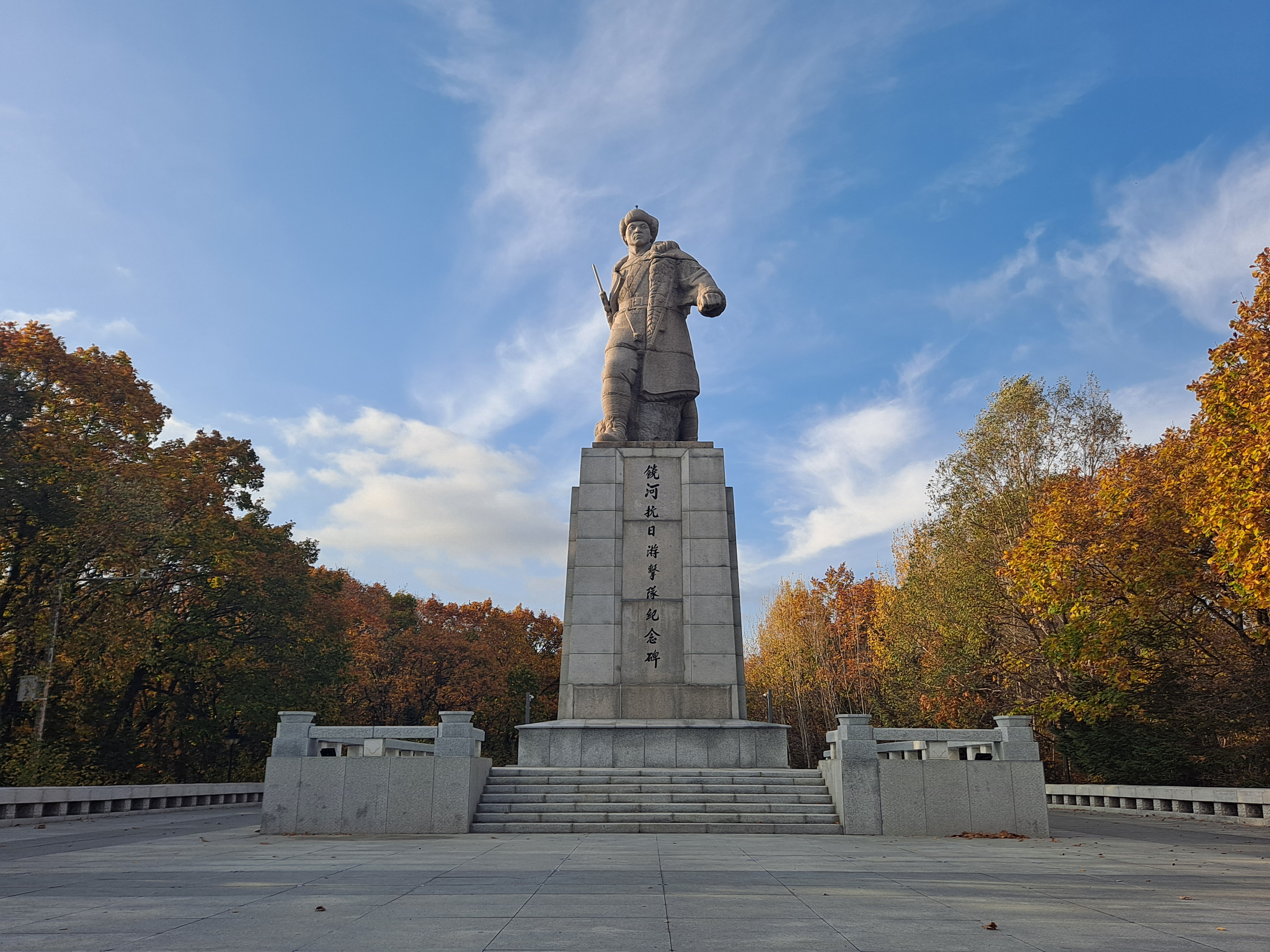
Monument of Raohe Anti-Japanese Guerrilla in Raohe, Heilongjiang, which was led by Korean general Choe Yong-gon in the 1930s

On 13 March 1919 shortly after the March 1st Movement in Korea, around 300,000 Koreans in Yanbian rallied on the Ruidian meadow in Longjing to protest against the Japanese and demonstrate supports for the 1 March Movement. This is the first massive grassroot anti-Japanese demonstration in Yanbian. A declaration of independence drafted by Yanbian Koreans was read out at the rally. The crowd then marched towards the Japanese consulate in Longjing, chanting anti-Japanese slogans and waving Taegukgi and placards. The crowd was stopped by Fengtian clique soldiers and Japanese police near the west gate of the Japanese consulate. Bullets were fired towards the demonstrators. Nineteen people were killed, 48 injured and 94 arrested. From 13 March to 1 May, a total of 73 anti-Japanese Korean rallies broke out in 15 counties in Northeast China. The total number of people participated in these demonstrations exceed 100,000.

In June 1920, the Korean independence fighters led by Hong Beom-do engaged the first armed force combat with the Imperial Japanese Army in Wangqing County, killing more than 100 Japanese soldiers. This led to the "Gando massacre" a few months later in Yanbian. The Japanese army killed 15,000 Koreans and destroyed more than 3,500 houses, 95 schools, 19 churches and nearly 25,000 kg grains. Between 21 and 26 October 1920, the combined Korean Liberation Army forces led by Kim Chwa-chin, Lee Beom-seok and Hong Beom-do fought the Battle of Qingshanli against Imperial Japanese Army in Helong. Local Korean residents provided vital supports for the Korean Liberation Army.

In the 1930s, many Koreans in China joined the Anti-Japanese forces led by the Chinese Communist Party. In June 1932, Korean leader Li Hongguang established one of the earliest Anti-Japanese Volunteer Armies (磐石游击队) in Northeast China. Most of its members were ethnic Koreans in China. Li later became a Key member of The Northeast Anti-Japanese United Army. Among the 11 army divisions of the Northeast Anti-Japanese United Army, Koreans accounted for half of the total number in the 1st, 2nd, 3rd and 7th army division. During the 14 years of fight against the Japanese, Northeast Anti-Japanese United Army killed 183,700 Japanese soldiers.

=== Resumption of Chinese Civil War (1946–1949) ===
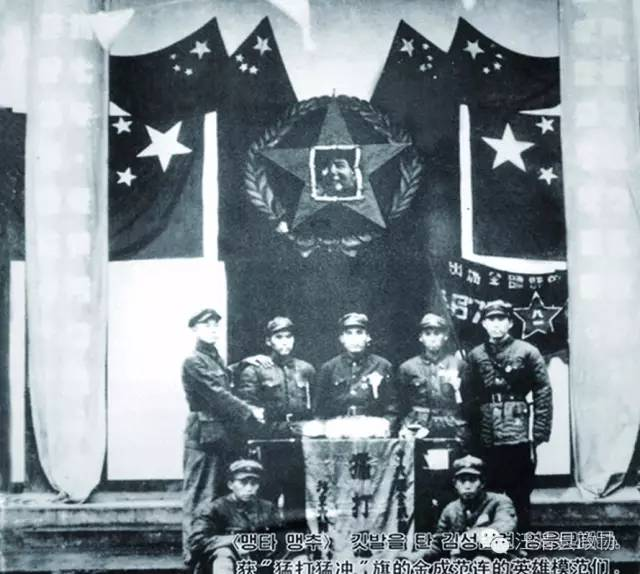
a Koreans company was awarded a banner for their bravery during the civil war

After the end of Second World War, Kuomintang forces took over the Northeast China from the Soviet Red Army. The Kuomintang initially implemented similar policies towards both Korean and Japanese people, impounding or confiscating Korean properties and repatriating Korean emigrants. Since Korean farmers played important roles in rice production in Northeast China, the Kuomintang revoked this hostile policy towards Koreans in China after the intervention of Provisional Government of the Republic of Korea and even took measures to persuade Korean farmers to stay in China to prevent possible declines in rice production in Northeast China.

In contrast to the Kuomintang, the Chinese Communist Party had been very friendly towards Koreans in China. Koreans had a long history of friendship with the Chinese communists. Koreans participated in both the Nanchang Uprising and Guangzhou Uprising, and contributed to the establishment of the Chinese Communist Party's army and the base of the Chinese Red Army in the Jinggang Mountains. The Chinese Communist Party considered Koreans in China as the same class of people in China who were oppressed and exploited by both the Imperial Japanese and feudal warlords in China, and a reliable source of support in the fight against the Imperial Japanese and feudal warlords. In July 1928, the Chinese Communist Party officially included Koreans in China as one of the ethnic minorities of China on its 6th National Conference. After the Japanese invasion of Northeast China, cooperation between the communists and Koreans in China strengthened and the social status of Koreans among the communists rose to new heights. The Chinese Communists let the Koreans choose whether to voluntarily become Chinese citizens and left them ample time and options to choose. In March 1946, Northeast China started the Land Reform Movement, allocating the land formerly occupied by the Japanese or rich Chinese and rich Koreans. Korean farmers in China received farmland just as other Chinese farmers did. From October 1947, the land reform was expanded to nationwide.

During the Chinese Civil War, 63,000 Koreans from Northeast China joined the People's Liberation Army, more than 100,000 joined local military forces and hundreds of thousands participated logistics supports. Soldiers in the 164th, 166th and 156th of the Fourth Field Army are mostly Koreans. They participated in the Siege of Changchun, Battle of Siping, Liaoshen Campaign, then continued to fight as far as in the Hainan Island Campaign.

=== Since 1949 ===
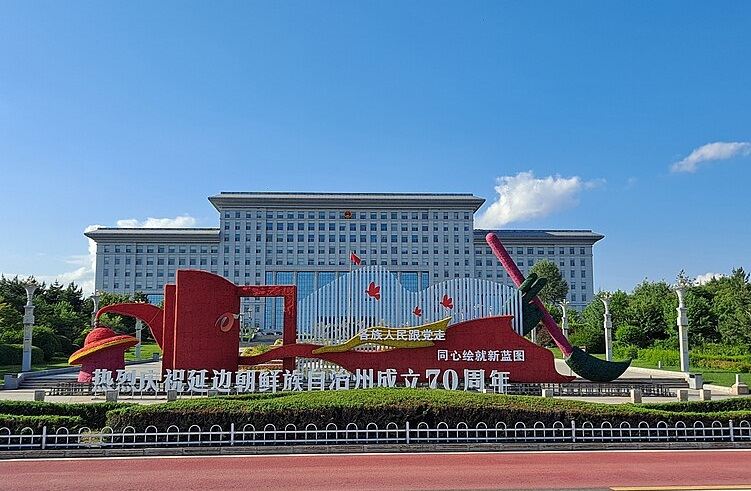
Yanbian Korean Autonomous Prefecture government building

After the founding of the People's Republic of China in 1949, Koreans in China became one of the official members of Zhonghua minzu. The total population of Koreans in China was 1.1 million, 47.6% of them living in Yanbian. In September 1949, Zhu Dehai, the chairman and local specialist of Chinese Communist Party in Yanbian attended the first plenary session of Chinese People's Political Consultative Conference (CPPCC) as one of the 10 ethnic minorities, participated in the establishment of CPPCC as a representative of Koreans in China. He also attended the grand ceremony for the founding of the People's Republic of China.

After the outbreak of Korean War in 1950, young Koreans in China actively joined the People's Volunteer Army in response to the Chinese Communist Party's call. These bilingual soldiers provided valuable communications help to other Chinese soldiers with locals in Korea in addition to manpower. Zhao Nanqi, Li Yongtai are two of the most notable Korean figures who participated in the war. Koreans in Longjing also organized the "Yanji Jet" donation campaign. Donations from Koreans in Yanbian reached the equivalent value of 6.5 jet fighters after the enormous destruction caused by the American Bombing of North Korea around 1.5 million Koreans were killed.

On 3 March 1952, Yanbian was officially designated as a Korean Autonomous Region and Zhu Dehai was appointed as the first chairman. On 20 July 1954, the first session of People's Congress was held in Yanbian. In April 1955, "Yanbian Korean Autonomous Region" was renamed as "Yanbian Korean Autonomous Prefecture" per the stipulation of the first Constitution of People's Republic of China and Zhu Dehai was appointed as the first chairman. On 29 May 1958, the State Council of the People's Republic of China approved the decision to designate Changbai County as "Changbai Korean Autonomous County".

During the Cultural Revolution, many Korean cadres including Zhu Dehai were prosecuted as capitalist roaders, local nationalists or counterrevolutionists. Many faculty members of Yanbian University were also prosecuted. The number of Yanbian University's faculty and staff decreased to 23.7% of that in 1966. The Korean language was labeled as part of the Four Olds, texts in Korean were burned, and bilingual education was suppressed. According to Julia Lovell, "[e]vents took a horrific turn in the frontier town of Yanbian, where freight trains trundled from China into the DPRK, draped with the corpses of Koreans killed in the pitched battles of the Cultural Revolution, and daubed with threatening graffiti: 'This will be your fate also, you tiny revisionists!'" After the Cultural Revolution ended, things gradually restored to normal.

On 24 April 1985, the eighth session of the People's Congress of Yanbian Korean Autonomous Prefecture passed the "Autonomy Regulations of Korean Autonomous Prefecture", which was later approved by the sixth session of Jilin Province People's Congress as law. The Yanbian Autonomy Regulations consist of 7 chapters and 75 clauses. It stipulated political, economic, cultural, educational, and social rights of and policies for Korean and other ethnic people in Yanbian Autonomous Prefecture in the form of law. It is the first autonomy regulations in China's history. These regulations stipulated that the Chairman of the Standing Committee of the Prefectural People's Congress should be a Korean, and that Koreans may occupy more than half the posts within the Prefectural People's Government as vice mayors, the chief secretary, directors of bureaus, and so on. Other regulations require the use of both Korean and Chinese languages while performing governmental duties, with Korean being the principal language used, along with encouraging the use of Korean in local primary and middle school.

In September 1994, Yanbian Korean Autonomous Prefecture was selected by the State Council of the People's Republic of China as a "Model Autonomous Prefecture". Yanbian was the first autonomous prefecture in China to receive this title and it had continuously received this title five times. According to a 2012 University of North Carolina honors thesis, the Chaoxianzu are seen as a model minority and have good relations with both the Chinese government and Han majority.

== Culture ==
=== Korean influence ===
Until the 1980s, Koreans living in China were culturally and politically tied closely to North Korea. When the education provisions for ethnic Koreans fell into total disarray following the fall of Japanese empire, North Korean authorities stepped in to help the re-establishment of Korean-run schools, providing books and teachers. When North Korea was officially established as a state in September 1948, notebooks with the North Korean flag were sent to ethnic Korean students in China. During the famine and political turmoil of the Great Leap Forward, many Joseonjok migrated to North Korea, which in the 1960s had a more robust and fruitful economy compared to China.

When relations between South Korea and the People's Republic of China were normalized for the first time in 1992, it had profound economic, social, cultural, and demographic consequences for the ethnic Korean community. According to Jeongwon Bourdais Park, it 'reshuffled the whole of Joseokjok society'. Closer ties between the two countries gave ethnic Koreans in China increased awareness of the economic opportunities and modern lifestyle in South Korea, along with their first exposure to globalization and capitalist democracy. This growing interest in South Korea was not only economic but also cultural. South Korea's rapid modernization, symbolized by the 1986 Asian Games and the 1988 Seoul Olympics, left a powerful impression on ethnic Koreans in China. Their perception of South Korea was shifted from a distant ancestral land to a model of ethnic and economic success. By 1996, around 120,000 Joseonjok (over 5% of their total population) had visited South Korea.

Many ethnic Koreans moved to South Korea in pursuit of the "Korean Dream": an aspirational lifestyle with promise of upward mobility, higher living standards, and a sense of ethnic and cultural belonging. Those seeking employment in South Korea were not limited to laborers — farmers, housewives, teachers, and even public officials also joined the exodus. As of 2011, it is estimated that around 200,000 Joseonjok reside in South Korea. This migration wave has led to the rapid dissolution of traditional Korean communities across the three northeastern provinces of China, including Yanbian. In villages like Huanan in Helong city, once home to over 300 households, more than half have since relocated, leaving behind aging populations and few young women.

However, there could be some benefits to this migration trend. In 2005, Chaoxianzu migrants remitted more money back home to Yanbian (US$300 million) than the entire official financial income of the prefecture (US$208 million). In other words, money sent home by migrants contributed more to the local economy than the government's own revenue. By 2011, these remittances exceeded US$1 billion annually, accounting for one-third of Yanbian's GDP, making Yanbian one of the wealthiest minority regions in China.

=== Dual identity ===
Ethnic Koreans in China have been said to have a dual identity: both Korean and Chinese. Some refer to Korea as their motherland and China their fatherland, or describe the dynamic as: “North and South Korea are the parents who gave birth to us, and China is the parent who has raised us". A 1997 survey found that over 70% of Joseonjok considered China their homeland, while only a small number felt emotionally connected to either Korea.

=== Education ===
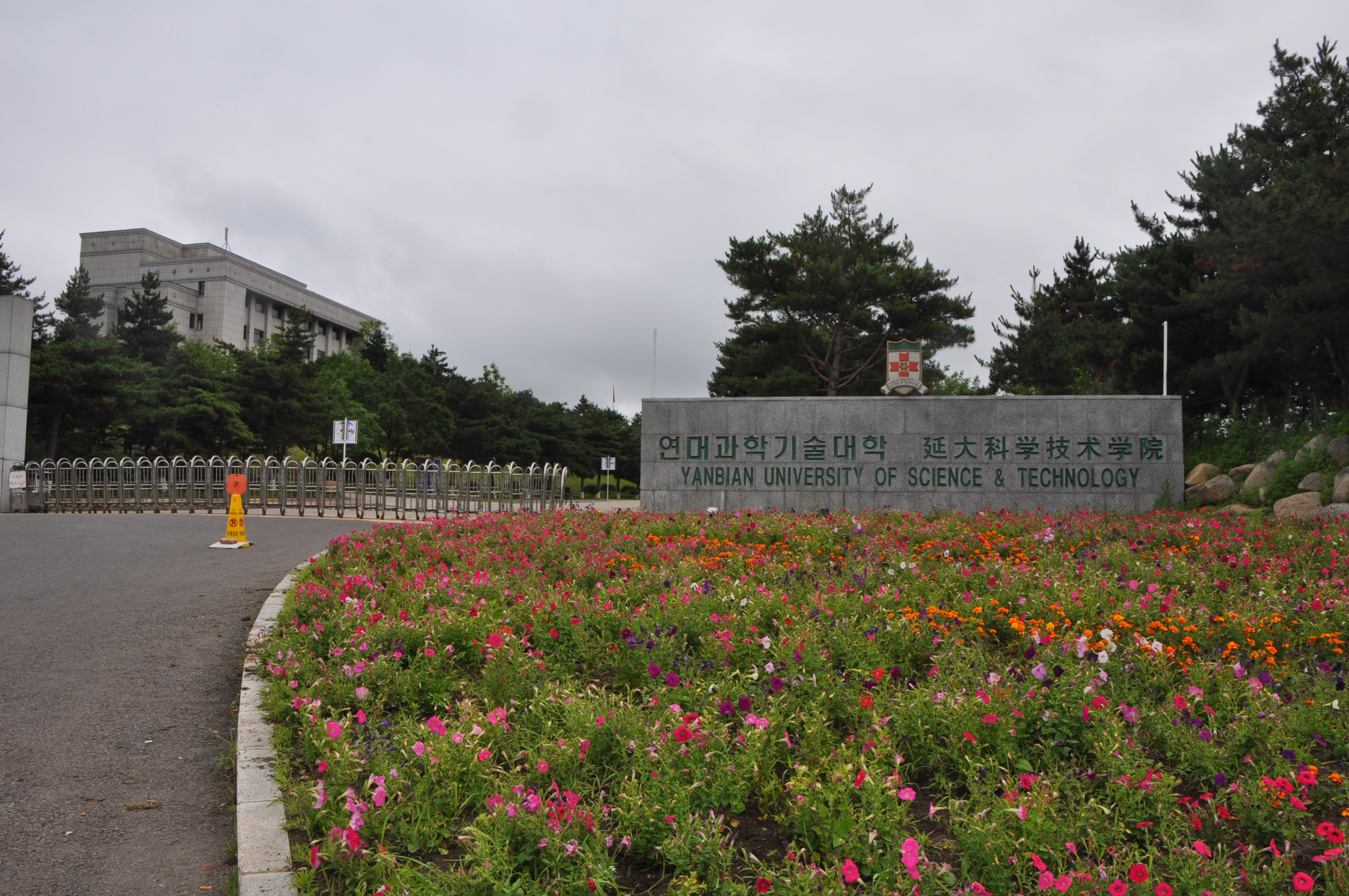
Yanbian University College of Science and Technology

Koreans in China are known for valuing education. The education level of Koreans in China is above China's national average and one of the highest among ethnic groups in China.

The 1982 national census revealed that literacy rates among ethnic Koreans were some of the highest in the country. Their literate rate is 3 times the national average. In the same year, the population percentage with a college degree among Koreans in China was more than twice the national average. Between 1990 and 2000, educational attainment among ethnic Koreans in Yanbian Prefecture increased markedly, with over 10% of Korean men attaining education beyond the university level by 2000.

==== History under the Japanese occupation ====
One of the earliest Korean schools in Yanbian was established in 1906 by Yi Sang-sul, a former Joseon high-ranking official, in Longjing. 70 students received an education in the Korean language on a wide range of topics—from mathematics to international law—free of charge, supported financially by Yi. However, when Yi spoke publicly against the Japanese occupation at the Second International Peace Conference at the Hague, Japanese authorities ordered his school to close with immediate effect.

Educational institutions for Koreans in Manchuria were often closely tied to anti-Japanese resistance. Following the annexation of Korea by Japan in 1910, six brothers from one of the most affluent families in Korea sold their assets and fled to Manchuria, establishing the Sinhŭng Military Academy in 1911 in hopes of training resistance fighters. Educators included Yi Si-yeong (future Vice President of South Korea) and Lee Beom-seok (future Prime Minister of South Korea). The Military Academy educated around 2,100 students until it was forceably closed by the Japanese in 1920.

To address the rise of anti-Japanese sentiment in Korean-run schools, Japanese authorities established their own educational institutions for Korean students in Manchuria. By 1928, these included 7 common schools operated by the South Manchurian Railway Company (serving 1,798 students) and 5 schools directly administered by the Japanese-occupied government in Korea (serving 2,312 students). While Japanese-led schools enrolled more students than Korean-run institutions in the Yanbian region, Korean-operated schools remained more widespread across Manchuria as a whole. Private Korean organizations operated 246 schools serving 7,070 students, and an additional 34 schools were affiliated with anti-Japanese organizations.

In 1937, the Japanese occupying forces further cracked down on Korean education in China. Schools came under the administrative control of the Manchukuo government, which subsequently closed 100 privately run Korean schools, imposed a ban on the use of the Korean language, and ordered education to be carried out in Japanese.

After the collapse of Japanese imperial control over the region in 1945, and the subsequent civil war, Japanese-run schools were in total chaos. Funding disappeared, and many teachers and Japanese education officials fled to Japan, leaving the ethnic Korean population to pick up the pieces and rebuild. By 1949, the number of middle schools had increased by 72% and student enrollment by 89% compared to the final year of Japanese control in 1944.

==== Decline ====
While instruction in the Korean language is important for maintaining cultural and linguistic roots to their homeland, it has been seen as disadvantageous in other aspects. Most students educated in Korean schools lack fluency in Mandarin Chinese, which can limit their opportunities and upward socioeconomic mobility in wider Chinese society. Consequently, more Korean parents began enrolling their children in Han schools. In 2000, more than 1 in 10 ethnic Korean elementary schoolers attended Han schools, increasing significantly compared to 1987, when just 1 in 30 ethnic Koreans attended Han schools. By the end of the 20th century, the number of Korean elementary schools had declined from 256 in 1996 to 183 in 2000, and student enrollment fell by nearly half.

The decline in Korean-specific education has resulted in unemployment for Korean teachers, with the number of faculty members at Korean elementary and middle schools in Yanbian cutting in half between 1991 and 2000.

==== Schools ====
The Chinese government is also very supportive in preserving their language and culture. Korean schools from kindergarten to higher education are allowed to teach in Korean language in Yanbian. Yanbian University located in Yanji city is a comprehensive university offering bachelor to doctoral degrees. The university is one of the Project 211 national key university and a member of the Double First Class University Plan.

There are also many South Korean international day schools in mainland China, including Korean International School in Beijing, Guangzhou Korea School, Korean International School in Shenzhen, Suzhou Korean School, Korean International School in Yanbian, Dalian Korean International School, Shenyang Korean International School, Qingdao Chungwoon Korean School, Weihai Korean School, Korean School in Yantai, Shanghai Korean School, Tianjin Korean International School etc. In addition, the Shenzhen Korean Chamber of Commerce and Industry organizes a Korean Saturday school because many Korean students are not studying in Korean-medium schools; the school had about 600 students in 2007. The chamber uses rented space in the Overseas Chinese Town (OCT) Primary School as the Korean weekend school's classroom. There is also the Korean International School of Hong Kong.

=== Religion ===
The majority of ethnic Koreans in China, like the demographics of China overall, have no formal affiliations with a religion. Major religions among ethnic Koreans in China include Buddhism and Christianity (with service in Korean).

=== Public media ===
The Korean language has been promoted in Yanbian partly by the government through a large network of schools, local Korean periodicals and television broadcasts, as well as a local law mandating all street signs be written in Korean and Chinese. Most ethnic Koreans in China speak Mandarin Chinese and many also speak fluent Korean as their mother tongue. Many Chinese of Korean descent have ancestral roots and family ties in the Hamgyong region of North Korea and speak the Hamgyŏng dialect of Korean according to North Korean conventions.

However, since South Korea has been more prolific in exporting its entertainment culture, more Korean Chinese broadcasters have been using Seoul dialect. The so-called Korean Wave (Hallyu) has influenced fashion styles.

In public appearances, ethnic Koreans in China are represented by the wearing of Chosŏn-ot, which caused discontent from South Korean ultra-nationalists during the 2022 Winter Olympics opening ceremony.

== North Koreans in China ==
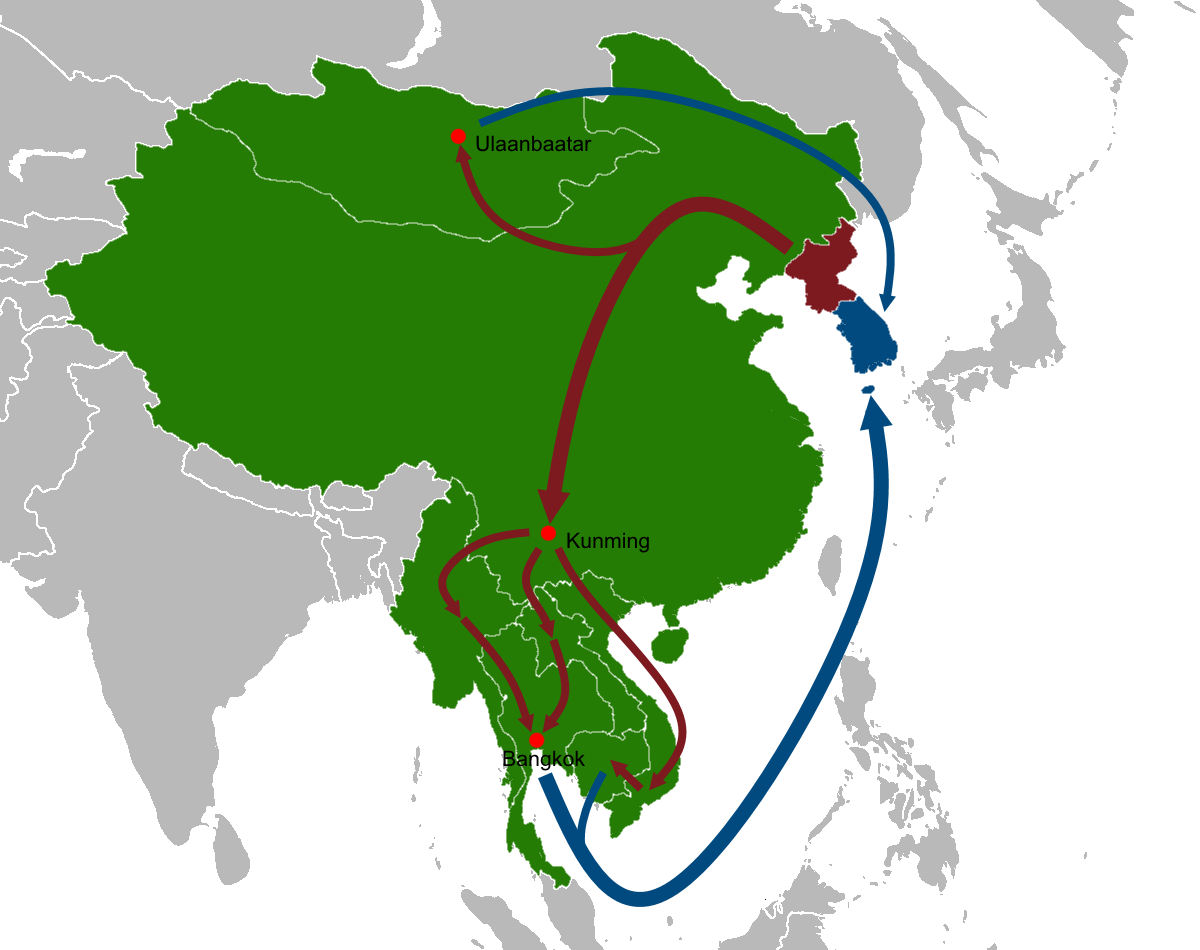
North Korean defectors often pass through China. Some of them settle there while others continue to South Korea.

North Korean state-owned restaurant, named Ongnyugwan, in Koreatown, Wangjing, Beijing

China has a large number of North Korean refugees, estimated in the tens of thousands. Some North Korean refugees who are unable to obtain transport to South Korea instead marry Chaoxianzu and settle down in China, blending into the community; however, they are still subject to deportation if discovered by the authorities. Although the PRC government estimated 10,000 refugees in the country, the United Nations alleged between 30,000 and 50,000 refugees, of which 75 percent are women. A large number of them experience forced marriage and human trafficking, although two academics have argued that many cases are more voluntary than forced. Most of the refugees originate from North Hamgyong Province. Victor Cha states that 86% of refugees seek passage to South Korea rather than remain in China, but this is disputed by The Hankyoreh.. According to a 2015 UC Santa Cruz paper, many North Korean refugees felt that China was the place where locals gave aid to them and did not judge them for their communist origins.

North Koreans seen as politically reliable by their government can acquire passports and visas for travelling to China. As of 2011, there are an estimated 4,000 to 5,000 North Koreans residing as legal resident aliens in China. An increasing number are applying for naturalization as Chinese citizens; this requires a certificate of loss of North Korean nationality, which North Korean authorities have recently become more reluctant to issue. Major North Korean universities, such as the Kim Il-sung University and the Pyongyang University of Foreign Studies, send a few dozen exchange students to Peking University and other top-ranked Chinese universities each year.

In June 2012, the Los Angeles Times reported that Beijing and Pyongyang had signed an agreement to grant as many as 40,000 industrial trainee visas to North Koreans to permit them to work in China per year; the first batch of workers arrived earlier in the year in the city of Tumen in Yanbian Korean Autonomous Prefecture. There have been reportedly 130 North Korean state-run restaurants in 12 countries, with most in China. Two have been found in Beijing, three in Shanghai, and others in Dandong.

== South Koreans in China ==
After the 1992 normalization of diplomatic relations between the PRC and South Korea, many citizens of South Korea started to settle in Mainland China; large new communities of South Koreans have subsequently formed in Beijing, Shanghai, Dalian and Qingdao. The South Korean government officially recognizes seven Korean international schools in China (in Yanbian, Beijing, Shanghai, Tianjin, Yantai, Qingdao, and Dalian, respectively), all founded between 1997 and 2003. Most of the population of Koreans in Hong Kong consists of South Korean migrant workers.

Typically, they come to China as employees of South Korean corporations on short-term international assignments or as employers of South Korean businesses operating in China handling Chinese workers; when their assignments are completed, many prefer to stay on in China, using the contacts they have made to start their own consulting businesses or import/export firms. Other South Koreans moved to China on their own after becoming unemployed during the 1997 financial crisis; they used funds they had saved up for retirement to open small restaurants or shops. The low cost of living compared to Seoul, especially the cheap tuition at international schools teaching English and Chinese, is another pull factor for temporary South Korean migration to mainland China but usually after this period, those that have moved have mostly gone back to Korea.

The number of South Koreans in China was estimated to be 300,000 to 400,000 as of 2006; at the 2006 rate of growth, their population had been expected to reach one million by 2008. By 2007, the South Korean Embassy in Beijing stated their population had reached 700,000. However, due to the global economic downturn in 2008 and the depreciation of the Korean won, large numbers of those returned to South Korea. A Bloomberg News article initially stated the proportion as 20% (roughly 140,000 people). Between 2008 and 2009, South Korean government figures show that the number of Koreans in China dropped by 433,000. The Sixth National Population Census of the People's Republic of China reported 120,750 South Koreans in mainland China, the largest single foreign group.

== Demographics ==
Between the first census in 1953 and the second in 1964, the ethnic Korean population in China grew at a faster rate than both the national average and the Han majority (which accounts for around 90% of the population).

However, this trend has not continued in subsequent censuses:

Population Trends 1953–2000
	Total Population (in 1,000s)			Annual Growth Rate (%)		
Year	Total	Han	Korean	Total	Han	Korean
1953	594,347	547,283	1,120	—	—	—
1964	697,943	654,565	1,349	14.6	16.3	16.9
1982	1,008,175	940,880	1,766	20.4	20.2	15.0
1990	1,133,683	1,042,482	1,921	14.7	12.8	10.5
2000	1,265,830	1,159,400	1,920	10.7	10.3	–0.1

Since 1964, the rate of growth of the Korean ethnicity in China has been lower than national and Han averages—despite being exempt from the one child policy—even declining in 2000.

Between 1989 and 2000, the birth rate among the Koreans in Yanbian declined by 72.8%, a steeper decline than both the Han majority (–62.2%) and the total population (–66.3%). This sharp decline has been attributed to the rising costs of child-rearing and education, a shift away from farming toward more aspirational but costly urban lifestyles, along with the imbalanced male-to-female ratio and marriage migration making it harder for couples to form.

== Distribution ==
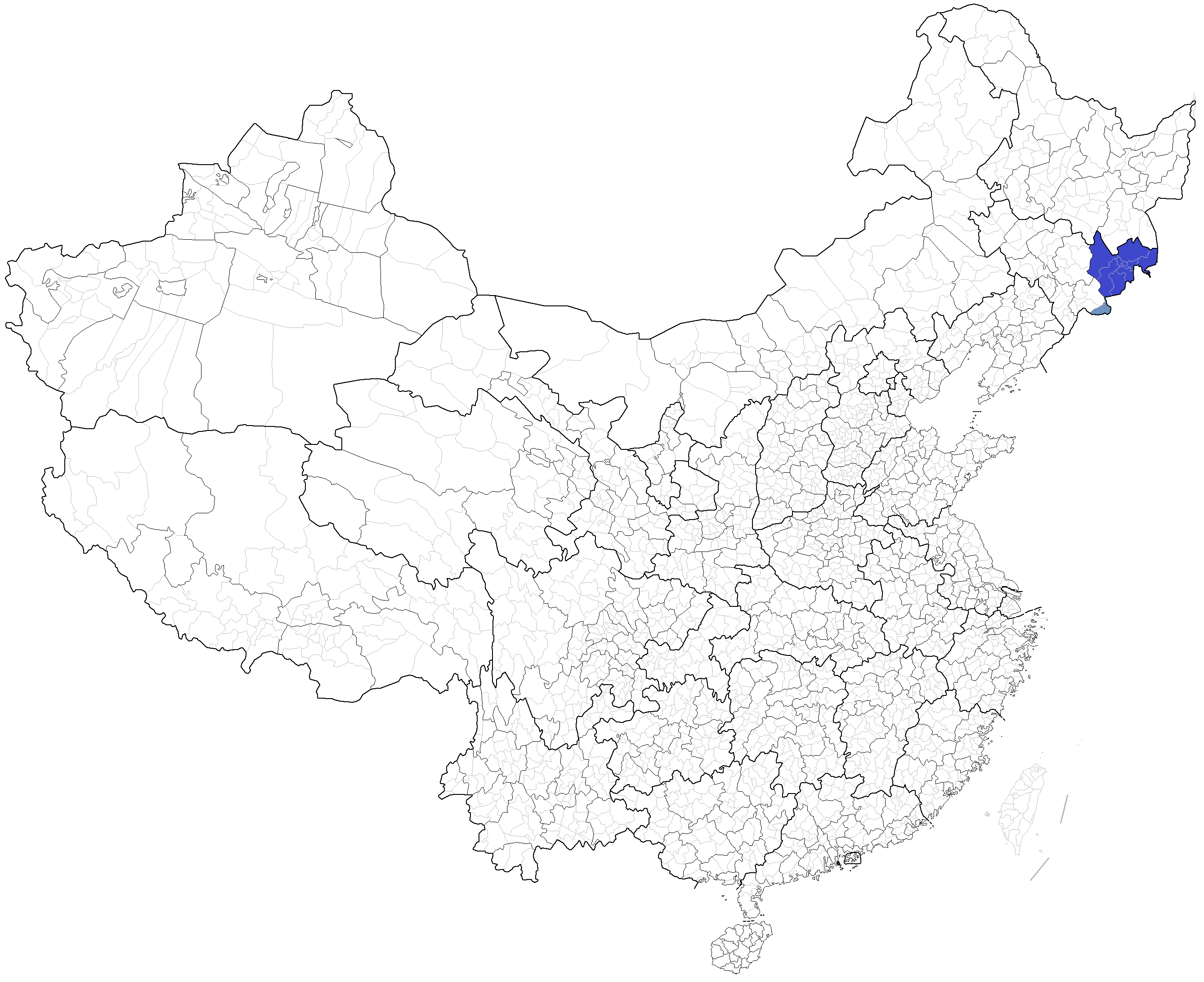
Korean autonomous prefectures and counties in China

The 2020 Chinese census recorded 1,702,479 ethnic Koreans in China. The ethnic Korean population in China is concentrated along the border with North Korea. In Yanbian Korean Autonomous Prefecture, Koreans make up a significant share of the population in certain cities, such as Longjing (65.4%), Yanji (53.5%), and Tumen (52.5%), while their presence is lower in counties like Antu (20.6%) and Wangqing (28.7%).

Provincial Distribution of the Korean (Chaoxianzu), from the 2020 census

Province-level division	Korean Population	% of China's Korean Population
Jilin Province	940,165	55.22%
Heilongjiang Province	270,123	15.87%
Liaoning Province	229,158	13.46%
Shandong Province	62,737	3.68%
Beijing Municipality	32,984	1.94%
Guangdong Province	30,666	1.80%
Shanghai Municipality	25,404	1.49%
Inner Mongolia Autonomous Region	18,216	1.07%
Tianjin Municipality	16,257	0.95%
Hebei Province	16,184	0.95%
Other	60,585	3.56%

=== Shandong ===
As of 2008 there are more than 148,000 Koreans living in Shandong.

=== Shenzhen (Guangdong) ===
As of 2007 there were about 20,000 people of Korean origins in Shenzhen, with the Nanshan and Futian districts having significant numbers. That year the chairperson of the Korean Chamber of Commerce and Industry, Kang Hee-bang, stated that about 10,000 lived in Overseas Chinese Town (OCT). Shekou, the area around Shenzhen University, and Donghai Garden housing estate had other significant concentrations. Donghai Garden began attracting Koreans due to its transportation links and because, around 1998, it was the sole residential building classified as 3-A. As of 2014 Donghai had about 200 Korean families.

South Koreans began going to the Shenzhen area during the 1980s as part of the reform and opening up era, and this increased when South Korea established formal diplomatic relations with the PRC.

In 2007 about 500 South Korean companies in Shenzhen were involved in China-South Korean trade, and there were an additional 500 South Korean companies doing business in Shenzhen. In 2007 Kang stated that most of the Koreans in Shenzhen had lived there for five years or longer.

As of 2007 there were some Korean children enrolled in schools for Chinese locals. As of 2014 spaces for foreign students in Shenzhen public schools were limited, so some Korean residents are forced to put their children in private schools. In addition, in 2007, there were about 900 Korean children in non-Chinese K–12 institutions; the latter included 400 of them at private international schools in Shekou, 300 in private schools in Luohu District, and 200 enrolled at the Baishizhou Bilingual School. Because many Korean students are not studying in Korean-medium schools, the Korean Chamber of Commerce and Industry operates a Korean Saturday School; it had about 600 students in 2007. The chamber uses rented space in the OCT Primary School as the Korean weekend school's classroom.

== Notable people ==
=== Historical figures ===
- Kim Gyo-gak, the Ksitigarbha at Mount Jiuhua (Originally from the Kingdom of Silla)
- Yi Tong (義通), the 16th patriarch of the Tiantai school
- Kim Ho-shang, Korean Ch'an master who introduced the first streams of Ch'an Buddhism to Tibet
- Seungnang (승랑; 僧朗), 6th century Goguryeo monk who went to China; his works heavily influenced Jizang and Zhouyoung and the Sanlun school
- Gao Xianzhi, a Tang general of Korean Goguryeo descent
- Gao Yun, Emperor of Later Yan and Northern Yan of Goguryeo descent
- Li Zhengji, general of the Tang dynasty
- Li Na, general of the Tang dynasty
- Li Shigu, general of the Tang dynasty
- Li Shidao, general of the Tang dynasty
- Wonch'uk, one of the two pupils of Hsüan-tsang, his work was revered and heavily influenced Tibetan Buddhism and Chinese Buddhism
- Chegwan (諦觀; 960–962), Korean Buddhist monk who arrived in China, who wrote the Tiantai Sijiaoyi (天台四教儀) which became a basic T'ien-t'ai text.
- Empress Gi (originally from the Goyang, Kingdom of Goryeo)
- Li Chengliang, general of the Ming dynasty
- Li Rusong, general of the Ming dynasty
- Li Rubai, general of the Ming dynasty

=== Contemporary Chaoxianzu/Joseonjok ===
- Jiang Jingshan, aerospace scientist, Fellow of Chinese Academy of Engineering
- Piao Shilong, physical geography scientist, Fellow of Chinese Academy of Sciences, Vice President of Peking University
- Jin Hongguang, physical chemist, Fellow of the Chinese Academy of Sciences
- Jin Ningyi (김녕일; 金宁一), virologist, Fellow of Chinese Academy of Engineering
- Hyen-taik Kimm, oncologist, known as "The Father of Chinese Oncology"
- Kong Xuanyou, former China ambassador to Japan and Vietnam, former Vice Minister of Foreign Affairs
- Lin Xianyu, former deputy director of the National Bureau of Statistics of China
- Bai Lei, Chinese football player
- Jin Yan, actor of the 1930s
- Cui Jian, Chinese rock musician, composer, trumpet player and guitarist; also known as "The Father of Chinese Rock"
- Han Dayuan, Dean of Renmin University of China Law School and Director of the Constitutional Law Institute of China Law Society
- Geum Hee, author
- Jin Xing, dancer, choreographer and actress
- Zhang Lü, film director, screenwriter and novelist
- Li Yongtai, member of the 9th NPC Standing Committee, Deputy Commander of the People's Liberation Army Air Force
- Piao Wenyao, professional Go player
- Joe Wong, Chinese–American comedian and chemical engineer
- Zhao Nanqi, People's Liberation Army general, former vice chairman of the Chinese People's Political Consultative Conference
- Li Xianyu, Fellow of Chinese Academy of Engineering, the first female general of People's Liberation Army Rocket Force
- Zheng Lücheng, composer of the Military Anthem of the People's Liberation Army
- Jin Longguo, soloist and former member of South Korean Boy Band JBJ
- Jin Yulin (김우림; 金雨霖; Stage name: D.Ark), rapper based in South Korea under P Nation
- Jin Bo: Chinese footballer
- Huang Renjun (황인준; 黄仁俊), member of boygroup NCT DREAM based in South Korea under SM Entertainment
- Jin Jingzhe, physician, delegate of the 13th NPC
- Li Yunfeng, athlete, delegate of the 14th NPC
- Zheng Haohao, skateboarder
- Tai Zhien, speed skater
- Cui Daozhi, forensic scientist, recipient of the July 1 Medal

=== Expatriates of other nationalities and their descendants ===
- Kwon Ki-ok, one of the first female pilots in China (originally from Pyongyang, North Korea)
- Pak Cholsu (박철수), head representative of the North Korean government-run company, Taep'oong International Investment Group of Korea (조선대풍국제투자그룹)
- Howie Liu, American-born CEO of Airtable

== See also ==
- Ethnic Chinese in Korea
- General Association of Koreans in China
- Korean Chinese cuisine
- Harbin No. 2 Korean Middle School
- Yanbian Korean Autonomous Prefecture
- Changbai Korean Autonomous County
- Koreans in Beijing
- Korean community of Shanghai
- Koreans in Hong Kong
- Pyongyang (restaurant chain)
