= Zhu Dehai =

Chinese politician (1911–1972)

- 朱德海
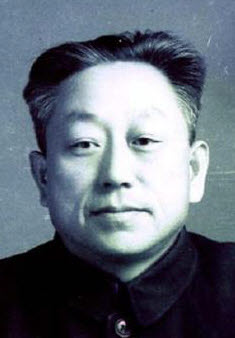

1st Governor of Yanbian Korean Autonomous Prefecture
- In office 2 September 1952 – 18 April 1967

Personal details
- Born: Wu Jishe; 5 March 1911 Dobea, Nikolsk-Ussuriysky, Primorskaya Oblast, Russian Empire
- Died: 3 July 1972 (aged 61) Wuhan, Hubei, China
- Party: Chinese Communist Party
- Spouse: Jin Yongshun (Kim Youngsun)
- Education: Communist University of the Toilers of the East

Military service
- Allegiance: People's Republic of China
- Branch/service: Eighth Route Army
- Years of service: 1939–1947
- Rank: Political Commissar
- Battles/wars: World War II, Chinese Civil War

Zhu Dehai (Chinese: 朱德海; 5 March 1911 – 3 July 1972) or Joo Duk-hae (Korean: 주덕해) was a Korean Chinese revolutionary, educator, and politician of the People's Republic of China. He served as a political commissar of the Eighth Route Army during the Second Sino-Japanese War. He was the first governor of Yanbian Korean Autonomous Prefecture from 1952 to 1965. He also served as the member of the National People's Congress (NPC) for several years. He was known as a political moderate and defied orders from the during the Great Leap Forward while maintaining a close relationship with the North Korean government. During the Cultural Revolution, the Red Guards stigmatized Zhu as a North Korean spy, and he was expelled from all political positions.

As a Korean minority high-ranking cadre, Zhu contributed to improve the social status of the Korean minority in China. His support for Korean's autonomy in northeastern China culminated in the establishment of Yanbian Korean Autonomous Prefecture in 1952. He also paid attention to the education for Korean Chinese. In Yan'an, Zhu was a founder of the Military and Political University for Korean Revolution (朝鲜革命军政大学; 조선혁명군정대학). He also played a crucial role in the establishment of Yanbian University, the first university in Yanbian prefecture.

Born as the son of a poor Korean farmer who immigrated to Primorsky Krai, Russian Empire in 1911, Zhu was inspired to become a communist by attending a school sponsored by Korean communists. As a member of the Chinese Communist Party (CCP), he engaged in guerrilla actions against the Japanese invasion of Manchuria in 1931. In 1935, he followed the party's command to study at the Communist University of the Toilers of the East and graduated in 1938.

Zhu joined the Chinese Communist Party headquarters in Yan'an and took up a position in the education department for the Korean Chinese minority in China. During the Chinese Civil War, he organized and led a voluntary battalion of Korean communists and occupied Harbin along with the People's Liberation Army. Zhu came to prominence through his exploits during the Chinese Civil War.

In 1949, shortly before the foundation of the People's Republic of China, the CCP appointed Zhu to be the first secretary of the Yanbian Local Committee of the Communist Party, which represented all ethnic Koreans in northeastern China. In 1952, he became the first governor of the freshly established Yanbian Korean Autonomous Prefecture. Simultaneously, he rose in influence in the central politics of China. In 1954, he was appointed vice governor of Jilin Province and elected to the 1st National People's Congress. He served as the member of the congress for 3 consecutive terms until the Cultural Revolution.

In 1966, Zhu became the target of criticism by the Red Guards in Yanbian. Mobilized by Mao Yuanxin, a cousin of Mao Zedong, Red Guards accused him of treason and being the province's "top capitalist". He resigned from his position in 1966 and was sent down to Hubei Province, where he died of lung cancer in 1972.

After the demise of Mao and the subsequent downfall of the Gang of Four, Zhu Dehai was posthumously rehabilitated officially in 1978. In 2007, his remains were moved from Wuhan to Yanji.

== Early life ==
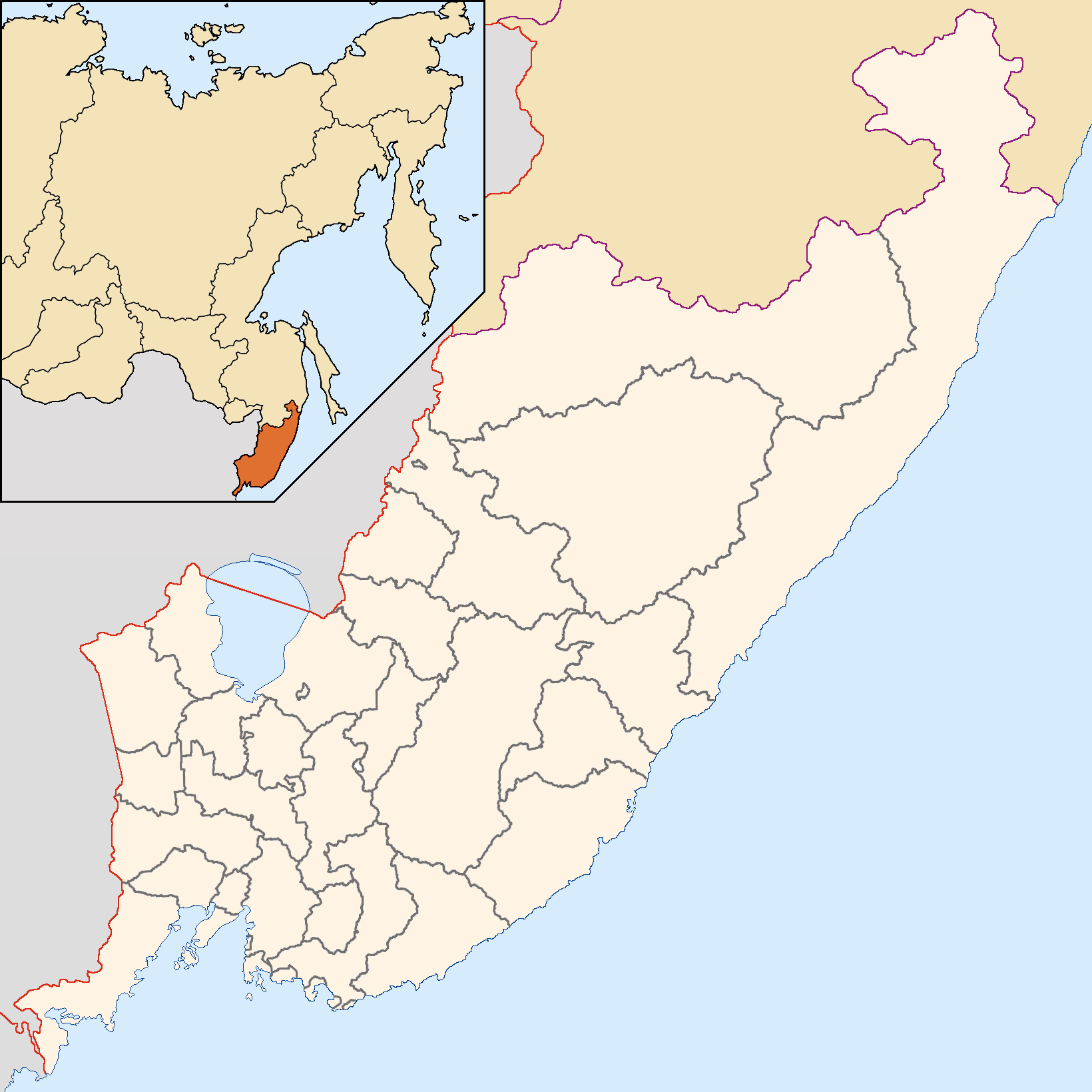
Map of Primorsky Krai

Zhu Dehai was born Oh Giseop (Chinese: 吴基涉; Korean: 오기섭) in Dobea (道別河; 도별하), Nikolsk-Ussuriysky, Primorskaya Oblast (present-day Primorsky Krai), Russian Empire in March 1911. His father, Oh Wooseo, born in Hoeryong, a border city in Korea, immigrated to Primorsky Krai during the great famine in 1902. Dobea, approximately 50 kilometers from Ussuriysk, was a small settlement established by immigrant Korean farmers like the Oh family. Oh Wooseo worked as a poor tenant farmer in a remote valley away from the village. Zhu was the youngest of two children.

When Zhu was seven years old, his father was killed by a Chinese robber. Zhu, his brother, and his mother Ms. Heo moved to his late father's hometown, Hoeryong, in October 1918. Two years later, the family moved to Jiandao, China, the most popular destination for Korean immigrants during the Japanese occupation of Korea. Zhu's family settled in a Korean immigrant town called Sudong'gol (present-day Guang Xin Xiang, Longjing, Jilin), where Zhu had an uncle with a farm.

In Sudong'gol, Zhu enrolled in the Fourteenth Public Elementary School of Helong County, run by the Republic of China's local government. Zhu's revolutionary and nationalistic consciousness was greatly inspired by the school's teaching of the Xinhai Revolution and Sun Yat-sen. Zhu graduated elementary school in Winter 1922. However, due to poverty, he could not continue his studies. He worked in order to support his family.

== Early revolutionary activity ==
=== Communist education ===
While working as a laborer in Longjing for several years, Zhu learned of conflict between the Japanese and the Korean minorities in Jiandao. In 1927, Zhu became a student of a private school owned by Kim Kwangjin, a locally prominent Korean communist. Driven by Korean nationalism and the ideal of the communist revolution inspired by Kim, he joined the Communist Youth League of Korea (고려공산주의청년동맹) in 1929. This organization was affiliated with the Korean Communist Party, an underground party outlawed by the colonial government of Korea. Zhu delivered secret messages among the organization's members, who were looking for a way to smuggle firearms to Korea.

=== Organizing communes ===
In February 1930, Zhu left his family to become a revolutionary. He joined a team of communists who planned to build a base for an upcoming communist's revolution in Ning'an, Heilongjiang Province. In Ning'an, Zhu settled in a farmhouse near the urban area, where his comrades stored rifles in secret. In August, according to the Comintern's new guideline, "One nation, One Party," he switched membership from the Communist Youth League of Korea to Communist Youth League of China. Later in 1930, the CCP's Harbin branch ordered Zhu's organization to prepare a riot early the next year. However, in November, the Republican authorities revealed the riot and most local cadres were arrested. In the midst of chaos, Zhu escaped from the scene and found refuge on a nearby mountain.

In January 1931, Zhu left his shelter and settled in a village called Chengzicun (城子村) near Jingpo Lake, under an alias. In May 1931, he became a member of the Chinese Communist Party and was named by the party as secretary of the village, in recognition of his contribution to the building of a commune.

=== Partisan activity during the Japanese invasion ===
On 19 September 1931, the Imperial Japanese army invaded northeastern China. As the nationalist government withdrew from the region to avoid confrontation, the Chengzicun commune became occupied by the Japanese army by late September. Shortly after the Japanese invasion, Zhu and his communist colleagues fled to Mishan, Heilongjiang, which was yet to be overrun by the Japanese army. The local committee of the party in Mishan sent Zhu to Errenbanxiang, a small town in the southern vicinity of Mishan, to build a revolutionary base in the village. He worked for the party in Errenbanxiang, forming a sham marriage with one of his comrades to avert suspicion from the Japanese patrols and pro-Japanese local authorities by 1934.

The Japanese army seized Mishan in May 1932. In a protest against the Japanese occupation, Zhu organized an anti-Japanese mass rally in October 1932. However, he was caught at the scene of the protest. When the police investigated him, he used the alias Zhu Dehai for the first time. He continued to use this alias from then onwards. Zhu denied the police accusation that he was the mastermind of the rally, and he was discharged. In Spring 1934, in order to break away from Japanese surveillance, Zhu moved his base to a mountain slope near the River Hada (哈达河), along with approximately twenty guerrilla members. For a year on that base, contracting tuberculosis, Zhu trained approximately one hundred guerrillas. These guerrillas later constituted the third battalion of the Northeast Anti-Japanese United Army, a partisan army fighting the Japanese puppet regime of Manchukuo.

== Activities during the Sino-Japanese War ==
=== Education in Moscow and Yan'an ===
Because his worsening illness prevented Zhu from working on the front lines, the party sent him to Moscow for treatment and cadre education. In Summer 1936, with his destination unknown, Zhu crossed the Russo-Manchurian border to go to Vladivostok and rode the train to Moscow. The party enrolled him in the Communist University of the Toilers of the East in late 1936. He first enrolled in the course for Chinese students but switched to the Korean course. During the coursework, he studied the basic theory of Marxism–Leninism, the history of the communist movement, and military strategy. At the university, he was also acquainted with other Chinese cadres, such as Kang Sheng, who later accused Zhu as a traitor of the party during the Cultural Revolution.

Zhu and his cohort graduated the course in Summer 1938. After a year of travel from Moscow via Xinjiang, Zhu finally arrived in Yan'an. The Chinese Communist Party ordered him to study further at the Counter-Japanese Military and Political University so that the party could send him back to work in northeast China. At the school, he studied with notable Korean communists such as Zu Chungil (who later became the North Korean ambassador to Moscow) and Kim Changdeok (who later became the commander of the Fifth Division of the Korean People's Army). He graduated the course in Winter 1938.

Map of Shaan-Gan-Ning Region

=== Eighth Route Army ===
In Winter 1938, the party cancelled its plan to send Zhu to the northeastern front, due to the impending Japanese offensive toward Yan'an. Zhu was instead assigned to the 718th Regiment of the Eighth Route Army. For three years, he served as a political commissar in the regiment, dispatched in Nanniwan of Shaan-Gan-Ning Border Region, a small village approximately thirty kilometers away from Yan'an. According to a biography on Zhu, he also participated in some form in the Yan'an Rectification Movement. In 1942, the party sent him to Yan'an again to enroll in an advanced education course for high-ranking cadres. During the course, he researched the application of Marxism–Leninism to China. In Yan'an, Zhu befriended Zhu De, Hu Yaobang, and Zhou Enlai, who later supported Zhu's political stance in Yanbian.

=== Education for Korean Communists ===
In 1943, after his graduation, the party ordered Zhu to establish a cadre school for the education and training of Korean communists. This school, later called Military and Political University for Korean Revolution (朝鲜革命军政大学; 조선혁명군정대학) was established by Zhu and other high-profile Korean communists, such as Kim Tu-bong, and trained about 200 graduates. Those graduates later formed the Yan'an Faction, a group of Pro-Chinese communists in North Korea. Zhu took charge of the management of the school until the defeat of the Japanese Empire.

== Korean minority leadership ==
=== Chinese Civil War ===
After the end of the Second World War, the United States and the Soviet Union occupied Korea. Many Korean communists returned to an independent Korea, which they assumed would soon be unified. Zhu instead expected that the division of Korea would be perpetual. He believed that Korean communists in the CCP should govern Manchurian territory in northeast China, where more than a million ethnic Korean lived. Once the CCP occupied the northeast, the communists could recruit and train a Korean army that could consolidate the divided Korea.

Amid continuing hostilities between the CCP and the Nationalist government in the Chinese Communist Revolution, Zhu was one of about 300 Korean communists who left Yan'an for the northeastern provinces to take over the former Japanese territory in late August. Zhu organized a voluntary battalion and took charge as the political commissar. His voluntary battalion, commanded by Lee Sangjo (who later became the vice chief of staff of the Korean People's Army), engaged in several battles with the National Army and finally seized Harbin on 28 April 1946.

In Harbin, Zhu met and married his wife, Gin Yongson (김용순) in Spring 1947. Spurred by the CCP's Land Reform Movement, including the Chinese Agrarian Law's passage on 10 October 1947, Zhu dispatched soldiers to the ethnic Korean–populated countryside to distribute land from landlords to peasants, sometimes violently. As a result, the CCP distributed 75.7ha of lands to Korean minorities. Zhu also took control of formerly Japanese-owned factories left behind after the defeat. He ordered the continued operation of the factories and exported manufactured products to North Korea. The trade between the northeastern provinces and North Korea contributed to the military campaign of the party in the northeastern theater.

In 1948, the People's Liberation Army named Zhu as the Ethnic Affairs Minister (民族事务处长), a position to administer all ethnic minority issues in the northeastern provinces. He particularly invested in the education and cultural programs for ethnic Koreans. During his tenure, he established several civil and cadre schools in order to train Korean bureaucrats to work for the party. He also established Yanbian University in 1949 and was inaugurated as the first president of the university.

=== Establishment of Autonomous Prefecture ===
By 1949, the communist victory in the civil war became irreversible. As the foundation of a new communist Republic of China was being discussed, Korean minority leaders and North Korean leaders privately, if not entirely confidentially, began to debate the future of Korean minority in the northeastern provinces. In November 1948, an official delegation of Korean-Chinese minority leaders visited Pyongyang. In a meeting with the delegation, Kim Chaek, the vice chancellor of North Korea, claimed sovereignty over Yanbian. Zhu's response is unknown, but Lim Chunchoo, the acting secretary of Yanbian, was inclined to support Kim's claim. While the official biographies deny that Zhu colluded with North Korean leaders, Zhu at least promised to support the North Korean regime, according to an article reported by Daily Yanbian on 1 December 1948.

The delegation of Korean Chinese of Northeastern China visiting North Korea to celebrate the foundation of the Democratic People's Republic of Korea, had toured and experienced the new democracy across the field of industry, economy, education and the culture. They were also impressed by how our democratic fatherland is going forward to the rich and powerful country by the hand of the patriotic people. The head [of] the delegation, Mr. Zhu Dehai stated that "Looking at the gleaming flag of the people's republic, we ... appreciate our glorified nation that performs the historical mission given to us." In addition, he pledged that he and overseas Korean will bring an honor to the revolutionary tradition and the glory of Korean nation perpetually.

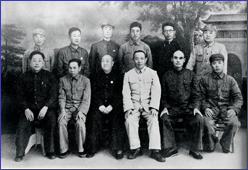
Zhu (leftmost on the first row) at the Chinese People's Political Consultative Conference (CPPCC) 21 September 1949

When Zhu came back to China, he reversed his stance toward the relationship with the North Korea. In a meeting on ethnic issues in January 1949, Zhu repudiated Lim's support for the North Korean annexation of the Yanbian region, and backed a plan for Korean autonomy that kept the area in Chinese control. According to historian Yeom In-Ho, this meeting was decisive to the career of these two Korean minority leaders: Zhu proved that he was a minority leader committed to the CCP, while Lim's affiliation with the North Korean leaders was seen as sectarianism. Eventually, Lim was expelled to North Korea. The CCP, facing a crucial battle in Shenyang against the Nationalist Army in 1949, approved the proposal for autonomy to secure the support from the Korean minority and to stabilize the home front in the northeast. Zhu was appointed secretary of Yanbian province in February 1949, and subsequently named the first governor of the Yanbian Korean Autonomous Prefecture in September 1952. However, several cadres disagreed with the party's decision. Some political opponents persistently accused of Zhu of loyalty of North Korea up to the Cultural Revolution.

== Anti-Rightest Movement and backlash ==
=== Background ===
In 1956, Mao encouraged intellectuals to discuss the current problem of Chinese society, and even allowed them to criticize the party and the regime (the Hundred Flowers Campaign). This movement boosted criticism of the ethnic supremacy and chauvinism of Han Chinese from minority intellectuals in early 1957. In April 1957, Mao abruptly stopped the movement and instigated the Anti-Rightest Campaign (反右运动) that purged the intellectuals who took part in the criticism against the regime. Along with liberal intellectuals, the campaign also targeted minority intellectuals who raised issues of ethnic inequality.

=== Movement in Yanbian ===
In Yanbian province, the CCP Yanbian Committee led by Zhu held several meetings in response to the Anti-Rightest Campaign. This meeting embraced scholars, artists, and leading figures in the cultural and industrial fields. In a series of meetings, Korean leaders sympathized with the Korean minority's sentiment over nationalism issues. For example, Zhu mentioned that "Korean Chinese people pretend that China is their fatherland. However, especially among the older generation over forty, they do not consider themselves as Chinese. When they come across trouble, they tend to miss Korea more in particular." Other participants, such as Lee Shousong mentioned in a bolder tone, saying, "Korea is not simply a foreign country for the Korean minority; Korea is the 'national fatherland (民族祖国)'." Notwithstanding the issues discussed in the meetings, Zhu and Yanbian Committee performed the rectification movement as ordered from Beijing. The movement aimed to attack three rightest tendencies: bureaucratism, sectarianism, and subjectivism. Zhu led self-criticism of the rightest tendencies among the cadre group in a series of symposiums in order to expand the scale of the movement throughout the prefecture. As a result, Jung Kyuchang, a renowned doctor at Yanbian Medical School, writer Choi Jungryeon, and other prominent scholars and artists were ousted from their positions and prohibited from publication as they were stigmatized as rightists.

=== Criticism toward Zhu ===
The Anti-Rightest Campaign provoked unprecedented criticism toward the high-ranked party officials and bureaucrats including Zhu. The main criticism came from Jin Minghan (김명한), the vice secretary of the Yanbian Committee. He was the first leading cadre who raised the issue of "local [ethnic] nationalism" (地方民族主义). Opposing some cadres' sympathetic attitude toward Korean nationalism among the cadres, Jin denounced "Korean [ethnic] nationalism" (朝鲜民族主义) for attacking the party and the regime to protect their personal and national interest. To defend the party from these sectarianists, Jin argued that Korean Chinese cadres should comply with the course of the Proletariat Nationalism, the official stance of the CCP on ethnic issue.

At first, self-criticism by the local cadres consolidated unity and affirmed allegiance to the CCP. But amidst the Anti-Rightest Campaign, the charge against provincial nationalism became a political slogan. From the early 1958, some students at Yanbian University condemned Zhu and high cadres for nurturing Korean [ethnic] nationalism. The student groups put up more than 45,000 wall newspapers accusing local cadres of being "local [ethnic] nationalists" on the campus wall of Yanbian University from April to May in 1958. One of the wall newspapers condemned Zhu and vice governor Li Haoyuan for their alleged claim that all ethnic Koreans in northeastern China should be governed by the autonomous government.

Zhu withheld taking action against the movement, waiting for the situation to calm down. After a turbulent couple of months, the Anti-Rightist Campaign tapered out late 1958. Zhu and high-ranking cadres in Yanbian prefecture maintained their position, despite strong demands to resign. However, the movement succeeded in abolishing of the Ethnic Education Agency of Jilin Province, which Zhu established. Six officials of the agency, five Korean and one Mongolian, were purged for allegedly being "local [ethnic] nationalists", at the demands of protesters. Consequently, the leading cadres of Yanbian denounced Korean nationalism, and calls for more autonomy were strictly restricted.

== Great Leap Forward ==
=== Politburo meeting ===
Earlier in 1958, a mass mobilization plan to raise up productivity in a short term, later known as the Great Leap Forward, was adopted by the Central Committee of the Communist Party. The party established a model commune at Chayashan in Henan Province, where private plots were entirely abolished, and commune members were required to dine at a communal kitchen. On 13 August 1958, Chairman Mao Zedong ordered the party to apply the model commune across the country. In August 1958, at a Politburo meeting that Zhu attended as the representative of Yanbian, Mao adopted an ambitious plan to surpass the United Kingdom's steel production within 15 years. According to Zhu's biography, Zhu was skeptical of the initiative's feasibility, although he agreed with the movement's initiatives like backyard furnaces. In Yanbian, Zhu ordered the establishment of an experimental commune in Longjing, Jilin. Within a month the commune system entirely replaced the collective farms in Yanbian: 921 collective farms were consolidated into 78 communes, encompassing 172,388 households. Also, the possession of farm equipment, livestock, and orchard trees, formerly owned privately, were all vested to the commune.

=== Productivity Improvement Movement ===
The commune system of Yanbian changed the lifestyle of people entirely. First of all, the communal kitchen was introduced. However, Zhu opposed running the communal kitchen all year round, suggesting three reasons below at a cadre meeting.

First, given the long and harsh winter in the Northeastern province, the households in Yanbian should stoke a hypocaust (ondol) in winter no matter where they eat. In winter season, therefore, it will be a waste of firewood if we stoke a communal kitchen and a domestic hypocaust simultaneously. Second, a collective meal for hundreds of workers could not satisfy everyone's appetite. In fact, people are already cooking leftovers again at home. Lastly, it became harder to feed a domestic pig and a dog. Before the communal kitchen, farmers fed leftovers to the pigs and dogs. Now, farmers should find another way to feed their pigs and dogs.

In winter 1957, Zhu persuaded the cadres to stop running the communal kitchen. However, other movements, in the name of the "New mode of production movement (新的生产高潮)," were beyond the control of the local cadres in Yanbian. For example, during the Deep Plowing movement (深耕高潮), Jilin province allocated a production quota to its subordinate prefectures, including Yanbian, and expelled a cadre if his prefecture did not meet the quota allocated. According to Zhu's biography, Zhu was reluctant to encourage the Deep Plowing movement, but he feared being criticized as a rightest in the aftermath of the Anti-Rightest Campaign.

The Jilin Provincial Party also gave Yanbian Prefecture a quota on steel and irrigation construction. At first, Zhu was optimistic about the steel production plan, because it had been his long dream to make Yanbian self-sufficient in steel production. In Yanbian, many communes built hundreds of backyard furnaces, mobilizing around 9,000 of workers, but the result was not as good as local cadres expected. In 1958, Zhu admitted his misjudgment and closed the furnaces.

== Cultural Revolution and downfall ==
=== "Fatherland" question ===
Ethnic minorities in China struggled with how to define their own nationality since the late nineteenth century, when the idea of nationalism was first introduced in China. The "Fatherland" (祖国; Zǔguó) question, or the nationality question, was particularly prevalent in the 1920s, along with the arrival of Marxism–Leninism. In 1925, Lenin published his thoughts about the liberation of oppressed nations, writing:

Victorious socialism must achieve complete democracy and, consequently, not only bring about the complete equality of nations, but also give effect to the right of oppressed nations to self-determination, i.e., the right to free political secession.

Lenin's thesis prompted some Han chauvinists and minority leaders to question whether ethnic minorities in China should claim independence. During the Yan'an period, Mao Zedong concluded that all Chinese people are part of the "mighty Zhonghua nation (伟大的中华民族)." With respect to the Korean minority, Mao wrote:

China borders ... Korea in the east, where she is also a close neighbor of Japan... China has a population of 450 million, or almost a quarter of the world total. Over nine-tenths of her inhabitants belong to the Han nationality. There are also scores of minority nationalities, including the Mongol, Hui, Tibetan, Uighur, Miao, Yi, Chuang, Chungchia and Korean nationalities ... All the nationalities of China have resisted foreign oppression and have invariably resorted to rebellion to shake it off ... Thus the Chinese nation has a glorious revolutionary tradition and a splendid historical heritage ... The contradiction between imperialism and the Chinese nation and the contradiction between feudalism and the great masses of the people are the basic contradictions in modern Chinese society ... the contradiction between imperialism and the Chinese nation is the principal one.

Mao and the CCP believed that the discourse of common nationhood bound by resistance to foreign oppression could consolidate the Han nation with the other ethnic minorities in China during the War against Japan.

The discourse of common nationhood was, however, unacceptable to most of the Korean minority population. Koreans believed that their status was different from other minorities in China. While other minorities were indigenous in China for generations, Korean Chinese immigrated more recently. Many of Korean minorities assumed that their "Fatherland" was North Korea until the 1950s. In 1948, the communist party even acknowledged that the status of Korean minorities was a special case. The Yanbian party committee announced that "the Party will admit that this nation [Koreans] is a minority that belongs to another "fatherland." On the other hand, Zhu officially embraced the "big family nation" advocated by Han-dominant party cadres, and that Korean minority is part of the big family, namely the Chinese nation. However, a few people were discontent with Zhu's point of view. Some Korean nationalists supported a "Multi-Fatherland" theory. It explained that the Korean minority, in the light of its historical experience, has three "Fatherlands;" first, North Korea, the national Fatherland; second, USSR, the fatherland of the proletariat class; and lastly, China, the third "fatherland" where they live now.

Some of the Han population was also discontent with Korean leadership in Yanbian. They believed that Zhu's policy was too skewed toward the Korean minority's interest. This ethnic conflict turned out to be the primary factor behind the political turmoil during the Cultural Revolution.

=== Rebellion in Yanbian ===
In May 1966, Mao launched the Cultural Revolution. In Yanbian, the revolution was initiated by Korean-Chinese students who were studying in universities outside Yanbian in the northeast provinces. These students were inspired by the ideal of the Cultural Revolution at their universities, and they came back to Yanbian to spread the revolution in their hometown. They rallied at Yanbian University in August 1966 and formed a rebel group called "8. 27 rebels." This rebel group was a far-leftist group that consists of Korean students emphasizing Maoist theory. The other students who disagreed with the "8. 27 rebels" organized another rebel group, "Hongqi Zhandou Lianjun (The United Army of the Red Flag; 红旗战斗联军)." By the end of 1966, these two rebel groups struggled to win the support of the public. According to the biography, Zhu asked them to return to school, but the two groups refused. The rebels said that they were in Yanbian at the request of Jiang Qing, one of the Gang of Four, as well as the then-first lady of China. Later, the rebels also accused Zhu of defying the order of Jiang Qing.

In January 1967, as Mao Yuanxin, a cousin of Chairman Mao, delivered an order to rebel groups, the Cultural Revolution in Yanbian entered its second phase. At that time, Mao Yuanxin was leading a series of attacks toward cadres of the party in northeast provinces. He announced that the criticism of rebels should be toward the corrupted cadre, Zhu Dehai. Mao also argued that the success of the Cultural Revolution in Yanbian rested upon whether the rebels could overthrow Zhu Dehai or not. Driven by Mao's announcement, the rebels denounced Zhu in public speeches and pamphlets. The most notable pamphlet was published in the mid-1967, the result of an investigation against Zhu and his close cadres.

=== Pamphlet incident ===
In 1967, the rebel group in Yanbian published a pamphlet accusing Zhu of being a traitor, a Korean nationalist, and a spy from North Korea. The relationship between China and North Korea was worsening during the Cultural Revolution as Maoists condemned North Korean leader Kim Il Sung as a revisionist. The accusations that stigmatized Zhu as a North Korean spy also implied that Zhu followed Kim Il Sung's revisionist line defying the orthodox Maoist dogma of the CCP.

The accusation was based on Zhu's statement in the late 1940s. First, the pamphlet accused him as an agent of Kim Il Sung. For example, the pamphlet, quoting the aforementioned 1948 Daily Yanbian article, argued that Zhu's statement about "Fatherland" (refer to the underlined part) was proof that he is a North Korean agent. The pamphlet also condemned Zhu for violating Mao's discourse of "mighty Zhonghua nation," saying, "Senile old man Zhu Dehai attempted to segregate Korean minorities from the big family of Zhonghua nation."

The pamphlet also alleged that the then-leadership of North Korea was plotting to annex Yanbian province. For example, this pamphlet quoted Kim Il Sung's statement at a meeting with Zhu in 1948, that "All Yanbian's [Korean] minority should serve their genuine 'Fatherland,' North Korea." According to the pamphlet, Zhu accepted Kim's orders and had played a secret agent role for North Korea. The pamphlet also suggested that Zhu aided and planned the large number of Chinese defections to North Korea in the 1960s, numbering as many as 28,000 people. The pamphlet concluded that Zhu conspired to establish an "independent [Korean] nation" in Yanbian and to merge the province into North Korea in the near future. The rebels pasted this pamphlet on the walls of streets in major cities of Yanbian. This pamphlet incident played a decisive role in the downfall of Zhu.

=== Deportation and death ===
At the time of the Pamphlet Incident, Zhu was under house arrest by rebel groups driven by Mao Yuanxin's call to depose Zhu. Cadres of the People's Liberation Army negotiated with rebels to save him from house arrest, moving Zhu to confinement in a hospital under the surveillance of Red Guards. During the Pamphlet Incident, the local CCP committee deported Zhu from Yanbian, not only because of pressure from rebels but also for his security.

On 18 April 1967, the party sent Zhu to Beijing. In Beijing, he reportedly worked with other deported high-ranking cadres in a farm. In September 1969, the party sent him to a countryside town near Wuhan. It is still not clear who was responsible for this decision. Zhu was forced to work in a farm with other farm workers, concealing his former position and name. After his deportation, Zhu developed a respiratory disease, which later turned out to be lung cancer. On 3 July 1972, he died from lung cancer at a hospital in Wuhan. In 1978, following the third plenary session of the 11th Central Committee of the Chinese Communist Party, the CCP Yanbian Autonomous Prefecture Committee made a decision to posthumously rehabilitate and restore his reputation.
