= Jin Hongguang =

Chinese physical chemist

- Born: May 1957 (age 69); Changchun, Jilin Province China
- Education: Northeast Electric Power University - B.S. Chinese Academy of Sciences - M.S. Tokyo Institute of Technology - PH.D.
- Scientific career
- Fields: Thermophysics
- Workplaces: Chinese Academy of Sciences

Chinese name
- Traditional Chinese: 金紅光
- Simplified Chinese: 金红光
Transcriptions
Standard Mandarin
- Hanyu Pinyin: Jīn Hóngguāng

Chinese Korean name
- Chosŏn'gŭl: 김홍광
Transcriptions
- Revised Romanization: Gim Honggwang
- McCune–Reischauer: Kim Honggwang

Jin Hongguang (Chinese: 金紅光; born May 9, 1957) or Kim Hong-kwang (Korean: 김홍광) is a Chinese physical chemist, and fellow of the Chinese Academy of Sciences.

== Biography ==
Jin Hongguang was born in Changchun, Jilin Province on May 9, 1957. Both of his parents are Korean medical doctors. He grew up in local Korean schools. In 1978, he took the National College Entrance Examination after the Cultural Revolution. Despite the language barriers, he was admitted to Northeast Electric Power University.

After graduation in 1982, he became a researcher at Institute of Engineering Thermophysics, Chinese Academy of Sciences and completed his master's degree there from August 1986 to January 1990. In 1991, he went to Tokyo Institute of Technology with a United Nations Development Programme (UNDP) scholarship, and obtained his doctorate in 1994. Afterwards, he became a Tokyo Tech Associate Professor.

In 1998, he was honored as a Distinguished Young Scholar by the National Science Fund for Distinguished Young Scholars (Chinese: 国家杰出青年科学基金). He returned to China next year to lead Program 973 research projects. He was elected as a fellow of Chinese Academy of Sciences in 2013.

== Awards and honors ==
- Distinguished Young Scholar by the National Science Fund for Distinguished Young Scholars (Chinese: 国家杰出青年科学基金) - 1999
- Program 973 leading scientist (Chinese: 国家973项目首席科学家) - 1999
- National Natural Science Award (Chinese: 国家自然科学二等奖) - 2009
- Ho Leung Ho Lee Foundation Science and Technology Progress Award (Chinese: 何梁何利科学与技术进步奖) - 2011
- Fellow of Chinese Academy of Sciences (Chinese: 中国科学院院士) - 2013
