= Li Yunfeng (skier) =

Chinese skier and politician (b. 1988)

Personal details
- Born: August 22, 1988 (age 38) Hegang, Heilongjiang, China

Chinese name
- Simplified Chinese: 李云峰
- Traditional Chinese: 李雲峰
Transcriptions
Standard Mandarin
- Hanyu Pinyin: Lǐ Yúnfēng

Chinese Korean name
- Chosŏn'gŭl: 리운봉
Transcriptions
- Revised Romanization: Ri Unbong
- McCune–Reischauer: Ri Unbong

Li Yunfeng (Chinese: 李云峰; born 22 August 1988) or Ri Un-bong (Korean: 리운봉) is a Chinese skiing coach, politician, and former professional athlete of Korean ethnicity. Following an injury sustained during an accident in 2010, he retired from competitive alpine skiing and halfpipe snowboarding. He was a delegate to the 14th National People's Congress, held in 2023.

== Athletic career ==
Li began alpine skiing professionally in 2001, at the encouragement of his father, Li Zhenxiong (李镇雄). By then Li had been training for two years; he was selected as a top contender by the Heilongjiang provincial ski team. Later that year, Li switched to halfpipe snowboarding and won the national championship; he also finished third in the Asian championship.

Li's father founded the Hegang alpine ski team in 1993; he was the team's first and only coach for nearly twenty years, until 2010. An accident in 2010 left Li with injuries which prevented him from competing professionally. As a result, Li retired from professional competition and joined the Hegang alpine ski team as their second ever coach. The team nicknamed Li and his father "Little Coach" / "Little Li" and "Big Coach" / "Old Li", respectively.

The Chinese press credits Li's father with fostering several top athletes in the country. For example, Li's father coached the local snowboarder and 2018 Winter Olympics silver medalist Liu Jiayu.

== Political career ==
Li attended the 14th National People's Congress held in 2023 as a delegate for Heilongjiang. He proposed increasing the size of China's national teams in winter sports and implementing the training methods of his home city at the national level. He suggested that the governments of wealthier cities in South China could provide financial support for such endeavors.
