= Geum Hee =

Korean-Chinese writer (born 1979)

- Education: Teacher's College of Yanji City
- Writing career
- Language: Korean

Korean name
- Hangul: 김금희
- Hanja: 金錦姬
- RR: Gim Geumhui
- MR: Kim Kŭmhŭi

Kim Geum Hee (Korean: 김금희; born 1979), also known by her pen name Geum Hee (금희) and the Chinese reading of her name Jin Jinji (Chinese: 金錦姬), is a Chinese writer who writes in Korean. She is an ethnic Korean in China.

Her writing covers issues of identity for ethnic Koreans living in China and the diaspora experience. She made her literary debut in 2007 with the short story "Gaebul" (개불; lit. '"Spoon Worm"'). In 2014, she became recognized in South Korea through her short story "Ok-hwa" (옥화), which is about North Korean defectors.

She received the Baek Shin-ae Literature Prize and the Shin Dong-yup Prize for Literature with her short story collection Sesange Eomnun Naui Jip (세상에 없는 나의 집; lit. 'My Home Nowhere in The World').

== Life ==
Geum was born in Jiutai, Changchun, Jilin in northeast China. She is ethnically Korean (Joseonjok), and she grew speaking both Korean and Chinese. She graduated from the Yanji College of Education and worked as a teacher at a Chinese-Korean elementary school. After quitting her teaching job, she worked in various jobs in China and South Korea, where she lived with her husband for two years from 2002 to 2004, cleaning and serving at a restaurant. Eventually she settled down in Changchun, China, and began to write fiction. She also finished the Thirteenth Advanced and Middle-Aged Writers class at the Lu Xun Literary Institute in Beijing.

In 2007, "Gaebul", a short story about the true meaning of love, earned her the Yun Dongju New Writer's Prize, awarded by Yeonbyeonmunhak ("Yanbian Literature"), the literary journal published by the Yanbian Writers Association (연변작가협회). In 2009, she received attention for her short story "Paran ribongui mojareul sseun yeoja" (파란 리봉의 모자를 쓴 여자; lit. '"A Woman with a Blue Ribboned-Hat"'). In 2010, she was invited to the Lu Xun Literary Institute in Beijing to study creative writing. In 2011, she received the Dumangang Literary Award (두만강문학상). Her first short story collection titled Syuroedinggeoui sangja (슈뢰딩거의 상자; lit. 'Schrödinger's Box') was published in China in 2013. The next year, she received the Grand Prize in fiction from Yeonbyeonmunhak for her novella Noran haebaragikkot (Korean: 노란 해바라기꽃; lit. 'Yellow Sunflower'), about a woman who lost her direction in life after her family fell apart.

She received attention from South Korean readers with the publication of "Ok-hwa", a short story about North Korean defectors in the spring 2014 edition of The Quarterly Changbi. This work was also translated and published in a bilingual English-Korean edition of Asia Publisher's "K Fiction" series. It was also published in her second short story collection Sesange eomnun naui jip (2015), which is also her first short story collection to be published in Korea.

== Work ==
Geum Hee's birth in China is why most of the setting or theme in her story stories set with Joseonjok or refugees from North Korea who have crossed over to China and/or Korea. She first started writing in 2006 where she wrote novels, and her first book Syuroedinggeoui sangja was published in 2007. She mainly writes her book to express what she feels and sees beyond a person's ethnicity and race. The writer has also mentioned that she wanted herself to feel free through writing her books. The episodes of her books are influenced by the people around her who were refugee families from North Korea, a Joseonjok who married a South Korean exchange student and similar themes.

Her first book was published in China but her stories regarding refugees were refused by the Chinese publications because this problem is also a sensitive matter in China. Instead, she sent the copy to a South Korean publisher which gladly accepted to print her story. This story is "Ok-hwa."

In her book Sesange eomneun naui jip, she writes in the dialect spoken by Koreans in China, which is different from the South Korean standard. This is why there are some expressions that came straight from the Chinese language and South Korean readers are unable to interpret. The author says that this is an inevitable due to the gap between cultural differences.

Moreover, she says that she not only wants to focus on a specific group of people but want to write a book where everyone can relate to the characters.

Geum Hee's sole translation into English is Ok-hwa, translated by Jeon Seung-hee, which was a nominee for the prestigious Ku Sang Literary Award.

=== Themes ===
Geum Hee is said to have expanded the scope of Korean diaspora literature. While many South Korean works of fiction feature North Korean defectors or Koreans living in China, Geum Hee's work is different as they tell the stories of women who defected from North Korea before they settle down in the South.

Considered a third-generation ethnic Korean living in China, Geum Hee believes that the ethnic Korean communities in China have disintegrated due to migration and links it to China's industrialization and urbanization. Furthermore, she also differs from the first- and second-generation ethnic Korean writers living in China, such as Heo Ryeon-sun and Kim Hak-cheol, as she specifically describes women's migration and paints multifaceted pictures of the identity of North Korean defectors who cannot be simply described as good or evil. In particular, she vividly describes the diaspora experience of people who choose to migrate for survival through a strong narrative and provides a detailed description of their psychological state. In this way, she shows that the reality of migration is not specific to the community of ethnic Koreans living in China but rather universal and links it to migration on a broader, transnational level.

In Sesange eomnun naui jip (2015), her first short story collection published in Korea, Geum Hee depicts not only the experience of moving to South Korea but also the identity conflicts of ethnic Koreans living in China as minorities and the issue of North Korean defectors as seen from the community of ethnic Koreans living in China. She also captures the issues of the family system under capitalism, disintegration of agricultural communities, and the ethical degradation resulting from materialism.

=== Major works ===
"Ok-hwa" is Geum Hee's first work to be introduced to Korean readers. It tells the story of a woman, who escapes from North Korea and goes to China and then to Korea from the perspective of a character named Hong. When she meets a woman asking to borrow some money, Hong is reminded of Ok-hwa and thus the relationship between Hong and Ok-hwa-Woman continues. In addition, rather than the simple dynamics of Hong showing compassion to the North Korean defectors and the North Korean defectors becoming their beneficiaries, the story addresses the dilemma and confusion about North Korean defectors.

"Nomad" (노마드 Nomad) depicts the reality of transnational migration through Park Cheol, as well as Su-mi, an ethnic Korean living in China, North Korean defector Seon-a, and a Korean woman who set up a hair salon in China. Park Cheol, who returned to his hometown after making money in South Korea, encounters the reality of the disintegration of the ethnic Korean community in China, through a friend in a failed marriage with a woman who defected from North Korea, a cousin who lives as a mistress to a South Korean man, and a Chinese person who runs an ethnic Korean restaurant. Faced with these circumstances, Park plans to start a farm and an ethnic Korean restaurant. This kind of ending suggests optimistic prospects for the future as well as negative prospects, since there is only a small chance of success for Park.

"Sesange eomnun naui jip" features three characters: the narrator, who teaches the Korean language, Yeon-ju, a Korean woman studying abroad in China, and Ning, a Han Chinese librarian. At the end of the story, the narrator builds a house that has an atmosphere unique to ethnic Koreans living in China, Geum Hee shows an alternative way to deal with the issue of identity.

== Awards ==
=== International ===
- Yun Dongju New Writer's Prize (2007)
- Dumangang Literary Award (두만강문학상) (2011)
- Yeonbyeonmunhak Grand Prize in Fiction (2014)

=== National ===
- Baek Shin-ae Literature Prize (2016)
- Shin Dong-yup Prize for Literature (2016)

== Publications ==
=== Works in translation ===
- 《옥화(Ok-hwa)-K픽션009》, 전승희 옮김, 아시아, 2015 / Ok-hwa (K Fiction 009), translated by Jeon Seung-hee, ASIA, 2015.

=== Selected works in Korean ===
- "Swallow, Swallow"
- "Irises at the Bus Stop"
- "A Girl Wearing a Hat with a Blue Ribbon"

==== Short story collections ====
- 《슈뢰딩거의 상자》, 료녕민족출판사, 2013 / Shuroedinggeoui sangja (Schrödinger's Box), Liaoning National Publisher, 2013.
- 《세상에 없는 나의 집》, 창비, 2015 / Sesange eomnun naui jip (My Home Nowhere in The World, Changbi, 2015.

==== Themed short story collection ====
- 《시린 발》(공저), 걷는사람, 2018 / Sirin bal (Cold Feet) (co-authored), Walker, 2018

== Sources ==
- Roh, Taehoon, "Review of Choi Eun-mi’s Mongryeonjeongjeon (목련정전 The Story of Magnolia), Geum Hee’s Sesange eomneun naui jip, and Jin Bo-gyeong’s Geseuteuhauseu (게스트하우스 Guesthouse)," Jaeumgwa moeum (자음과모음Vowels and Consonants) Spring 2016, 376–385.
- Roh, Sin-ju, "Introspection of Modernity in Kim Geum Hee’s Fiction," Jangbaeksan (장백산 Mount Baekdu) January 2014, 205–217.
- Lee, Gyeong-jae, "Another Perspective on the North Korean Defectors," Ok-hwa, translated by Jeon Seung-hee, Asia, 2015.
