= Jiang Jingshan =

Chinese aerospace engineer (1936–2021)

- 姜景山
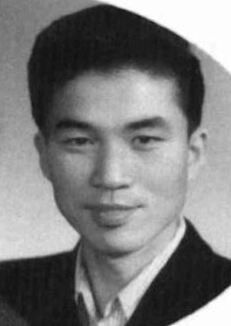
- Born: February 1936; Longjing, Jilin, Manchukuo
- Died: 27 June 2021 (aged 85); Beijing, China
- Education: Saint Petersburg Electrotechnical University
- Spouse: Chen Zenghui
- Scientific career
- Fields: Spaceflight engineering
- Workplaces: Center for Space Science and Applied Research, Chinese Academy of Sciences

Jiang Jingshan or Kang Kyung-san (Chinese: 姜景山; pinyin: Jiāng Jǐngshān; Korean: 강경산; February 1936 – 27 June 2021) was a Chinese aerospace engineer with expertise in microwave remote sensing and spaceflight engineering. He had been the director of the Center for Space Science and Applied Research, Chinese Academy of Sciences, deputy chief designer of the Chinese Lunar Exploration Program and an aerospace expert of China's 863 Program.

== Biography ==
Jiang was born in February 1936, in Longjing, in Yanbian Korean Autonomous Prefecture, Jilin Province, Manchukuo. He was of Korean descent. He became the first Chinese researcher of microwave remote sensing technology, after his participation in the creation of China's first satellite, Dong Fang Hong I. He was the founder of China's National Microwave Remote Sensing Laboratory (NMRS), Chinese Academy of Sciences.

He was an academician of Chinese Academy of Engineering, International Eurasian Academy of Sciences and a member of CN COSPAR.

Jiang was married to Chen Zenghui (Chinese: 陈增辉); they had two children together.
