= Harbin No. 2 Korean Middle School =

Korean middle school in China

Coordinates: 45.772182°N 126.615023°E

Harbin Korean No. 2 Middle School
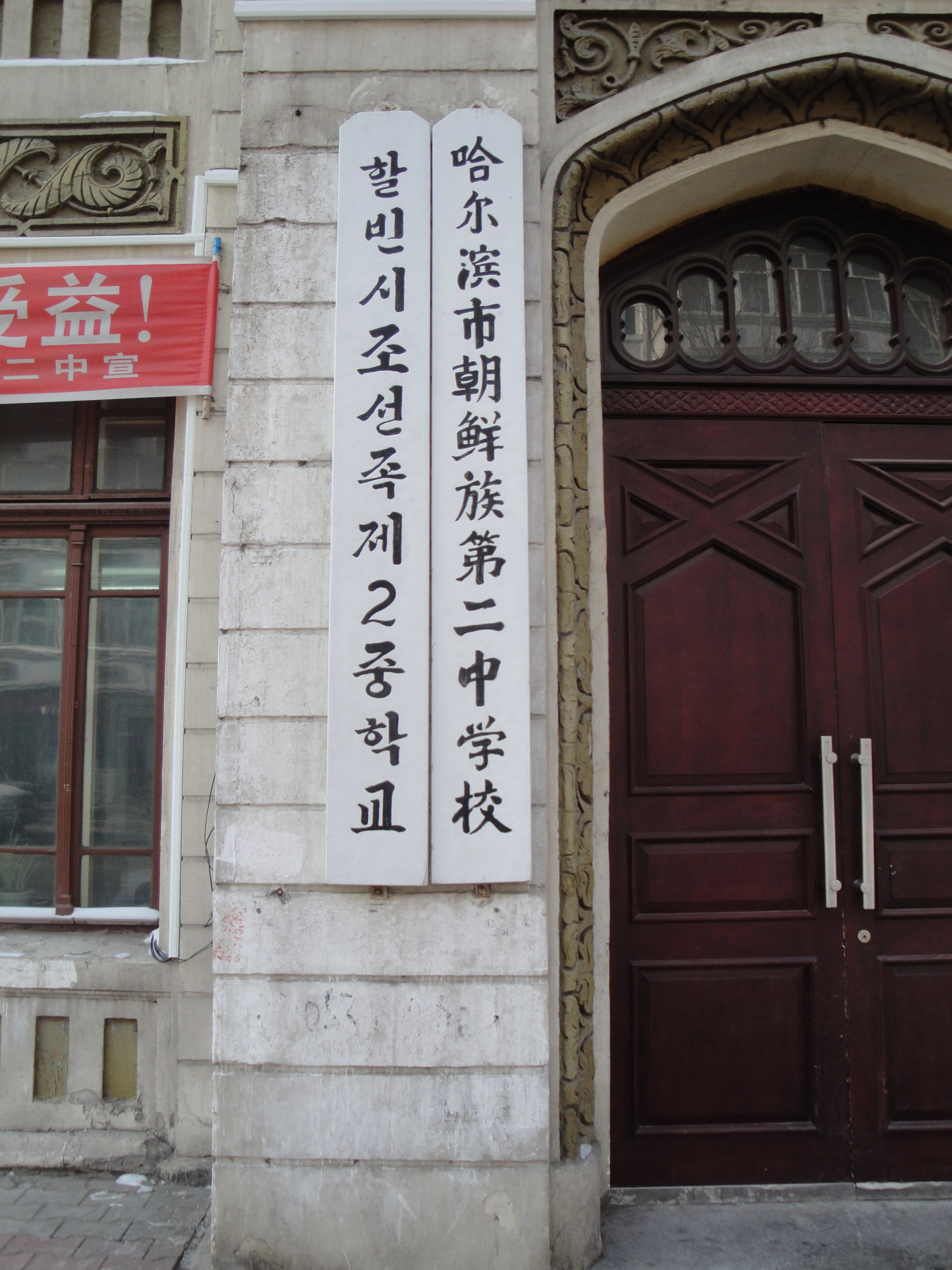
- Simplified Chinese: 哈尔滨市朝鲜族第二中学校
- Traditional Chinese: 哈爾濱市朝鮮族第二中學校
Transcriptions
Standard Mandarin
- Hanyu Pinyin: Hā'ěrbīn Shì Cháoxiǎn Zú Dì-èr Zhōngxuéxiào

Chinese Korean name
- Chosŏn'gŭl: 할빈시조선족제2중학교
- Hancha: 할빈市朝鮮族第二中學校
Transcriptions
- Revised Romanization: Halbin-si Joseonjok Je-Yi Junghakkyo
- McCune–Reischauer: Halbin-si Chosŏnjok Che-Yi Chunghakkyo

The Harbin Korean No. 2 Middle School (also Harbin Korean 2nd Nationality Middle School) is a school for ethnic Korean residents of Harbin, Heilongjiang in northeast China.

== History ==
Korean No. 2 Middle School was established in 1962, and received permission to convert from an ordinary middle school to a foreign-language vocational middle school in September 1992. It was the only ethnic vocational middle school in Heilongjiang province. Its conversion into a municipal-level standard school was approved in December 2010.

In 2006, the Heilongjiang College of Education organised computer training for teachers at the school and several other Korean schools in the province. In 2011, the school signed an agreement with the Harbin Tourism Department to train Korean-speaking tour guides.

== Building ==
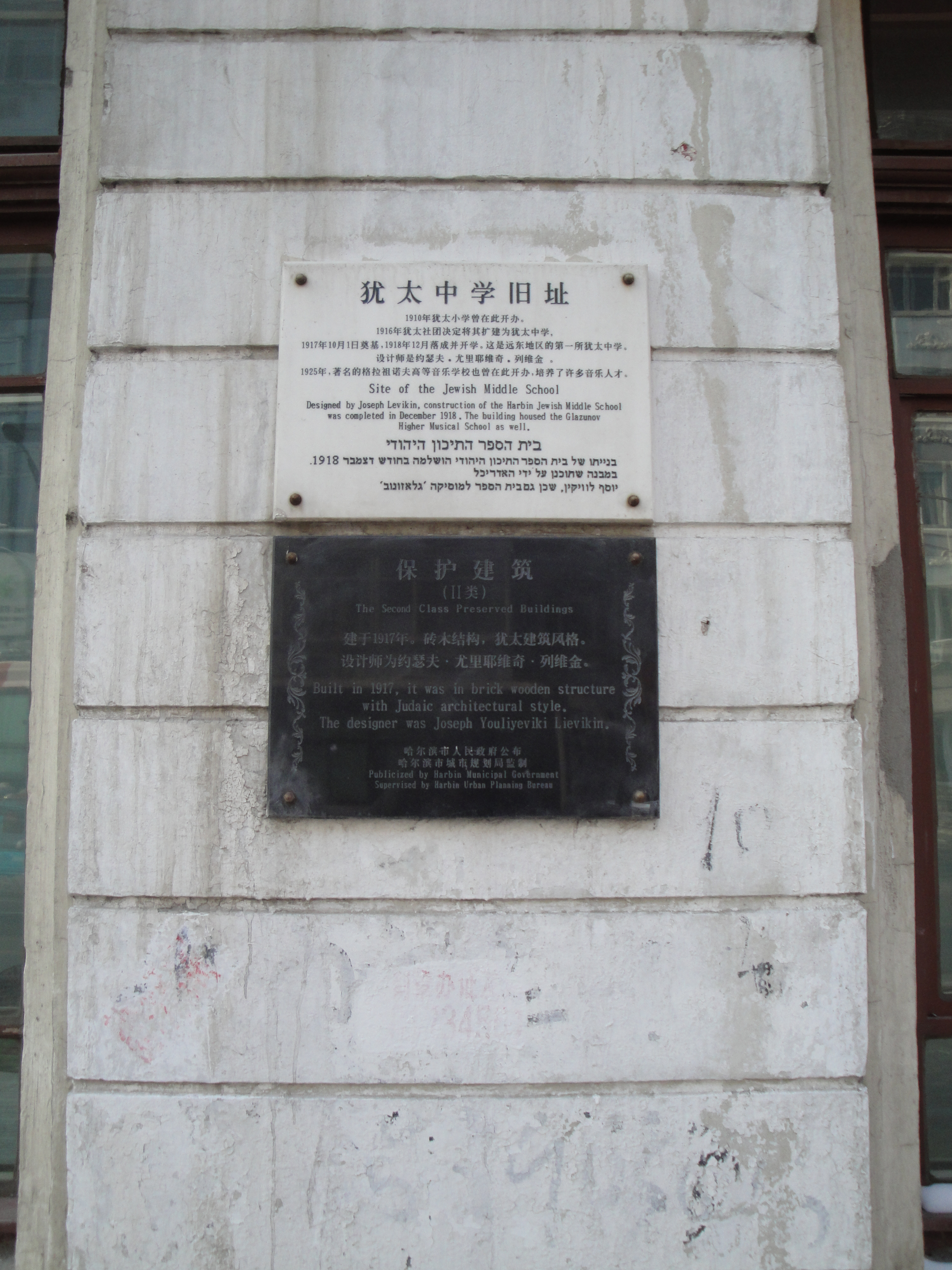
Commemorative plaque on Korean No. 2 Middle School building

The No. 2 Korean Middle School is located at 86 Tongjiang Street, Daoli District, in a building constructed in the late 1910s. The same building once housed the city's Jewish Middle School; it is listed by the municipal government as a second-class preserved historical building.
