= Li Xianyu =

Chinese missile expert

- Born: April 26, 1965 (age 61); Mudanjiang, Heilongjiang, China
- Education: Peking University
- Scientific career
- Fields: Missile command systems
- Workplaces: People's Liberation Army Rocket Force Research Academy

Chinese name
- Traditional Chinese: 李賢玉
- Simplified Chinese: 李贤玉
Transcriptions
Standard Mandarin
- Hanyu Pinyin: Lǐ Xiányù

Chinese Korean name
- Chosŏn'gŭl: 리현옥
- Hancha: 李賢玉
Transcriptions
- Revised Romanization: Ri Hyeonok
- McCune–Reischauer: Ri Hyŏnok

Li Xianyu or Ri Hyon-ok (Chinese: 李贤玉; Korean: 리현옥; born 26 April 1965) is a Chinese engineer and missile expert. She serves as the director of a research institute of the People's Liberation Army Rocket Force Research Academy and holds the military rank of major general. She is an academician of the Chinese Academy of Engineering.

== Early life and education ==
Li was born into an ethnic Korean family in Mudanjiang, Heilongjiang province in 1965. Her father was an engineer and her mother an accountant.

Upon completing the 11th grade in 1982, she took the National College Entrance Examination a year early, and earned the highest marks in Heilongjiang province. She was admitted to Peking University, where she majored in radio physics. She obtained her bachelor's degree in 1986 and her master's in July 1990.

== Career ==
In 1990, Li enlisted in the Second Artillery Force, China's strategic missile force. Spurred by the US military's use of information technology in the Gulf War, the Second Artillery initiated an informationization and command automation project in 1992. Li joined the project as its youngest member and was tasked with developing a network framework and a real time data transmission system. In the summer of 1995, the system was successfully tested in a military exercise. It won the People's Liberation Army's Science and Technology Progress Award (Second Class).

After the Iraq War broke out in 2003, the US military again demonstrated the advantage of information technology in battlefield, and the Second Artillery Force decided to develop a mobile command system. Li, who had just been appointed chief engineer of a research institute of the missile force, was put in charge of the project. In 2006, the system passed its test in a military exercise, and the commander of the Second Artillery Force praised Li as being "equal to several brigade commanders combined". The system was awarded the State Science and Technology Progress Award (Second Class).

In 2007, Li proposed the development of China's own command system software, which came into fruition three years later. She also spent six years developing a unified control system for the strategic missile force.

On July 6, 2015, Li was awarded the military rank of major general (shaojiang), the first and only female general in the Second Artillery Force, which became the People's Liberation Army Rocket Force (PLARF) later that year. She currently serves as director of a research institute of the People's Liberation Army Rocket Force Research Academy.

Li was a delegate to the 9th and 12th National People's Congress. In January 2018, she became a member of the National Committee of the 13th Chinese People's Political Consultative Conference. In November 2019, she was elected an academician of the Chinese Academy of Engineering.

== Personal life ==
She is married and has a son.

== Honours and awards ==
- November 22, 2019 Member of the Chinese Academy of Engineering (CAE)
