= Nedu =

NEDU can refer to:

- Northeast Dianli University - Northeast Dianli University (NEDU; Chinese: 东北电力大学; pinyin: Dōngběi Diànlì Dàxué) is a university in Jilin City, Jilin Province, China.
- Navy Experimental Diving Unit - The United States Navy Experimental Diving Unit (NEDU or NAVXDIVINGU) is the primary source of diving and hyperbaric operational guidance for the US Navy. It is located within the Naval Support Activity Panama City in Panama City Beach, Bay County, Florida.
