= Sanhe, Longjing =

Sanhe 三合镇
- Town
- Location in Jilin
- Coordinates: 42°28′36″N 129°44′20″E
- Country: People's Republic of China
- Province: Jilin
- Autonomous prefecture: Yanbian
- County-level city: Longjing
- Village-level divisions: 1 residential community 4 villages
- Elevation: 218 m (715 ft)
- Time zone: UTC+8 (China Standard)
- Area code: 0433

Sanhe (Chinese: 三合; pinyin: Sānhé) is a town under the administration of Longjing City in southeastern Jilin, People's Republic of China, located along the Sino-Korean border west of North Korea; the nearest major settlement across the Tumen River (and the border) is Hoeryong in North Hamgyong Province. It is 41 kilometres (25 mi) southeast of downtown Longjing and 50 km (31 mi) south-southeast of Yanji. As of 2018, it has one residential community (社区) and four villages under its administration.

== See also ==
- List of township-level divisions of Jilin
