= Korean School in Yantai =

- 연대한국학교 烟台韩国学校

Location
- 1001 Fenghuang N. Road, Laishan District, Yantai, Shandong, China 264003 우) 264-003 중국 산동성 연대시 래산구 봉황북로 1001호 中国山东省烟台市 莱山区凤凰北路1001号; China
- Coordinates: 37.472211°N 121.41403600000001°E

Information
- Established: March 5, 2001.
- Website: koreaschool.org

Korean School in Yantai (Korean: 연대한국학교, simplified Chinese: 烟台韩国学校; traditional Chinese: 煙臺韓國學校; pinyin: Yāntái Hánguó Xuéxiào) is a Korean international school in Laishan District, Yantai, Shandong, China.

It was established on March 5, 2001. It serves levels kindergarten through senior high school.

Its campus was previously elsewhere in Chenjia Village (陈家村), Chujia Town (初家镇), Laishan District.

== See also ==
- Koreans in China
