= Yi Tong =

Chinese researcher and politician (born 1967)

- 伊彤

Representative of National People's Congress
- Incumbent
- Assumed office 2018
- Constituency: Beijing

Representative of Beijing Municipal People's Congress

Assembly Member for Haidian
- In office 14th Congress – 15th Congress
- Parliamentary group: Office of Education, Science, Culture, Health and Sports

Personal details
- Born: February 1967 (age 59)
- Occupation: Researcher, Politician

Yi Tong (Chinese: 伊彤; born February 1967) is a Manchu researcher and the director of Innovation at the Beijing Academy of Science and Technology.

Yi Tong was elected as a representative to the 14th and 15th Beijing Municipal People's Congresses in the Haidian constituency and a member of the Office of Education, Science, Culture, Health and Sports of the 15th Beijing Municipal People's Congress.

In January 2018, she was elected as one of the delegates from Beijing to the 13th National People's Congress.

== See also ==
- List of members of the 13th National People's Congress
