= Longjing, Jilin =

County-level city in the Yanbian Korean Autonomous Prefecture, Jilin, China

Longjing 龙井市 · 룡정시
- County-level city
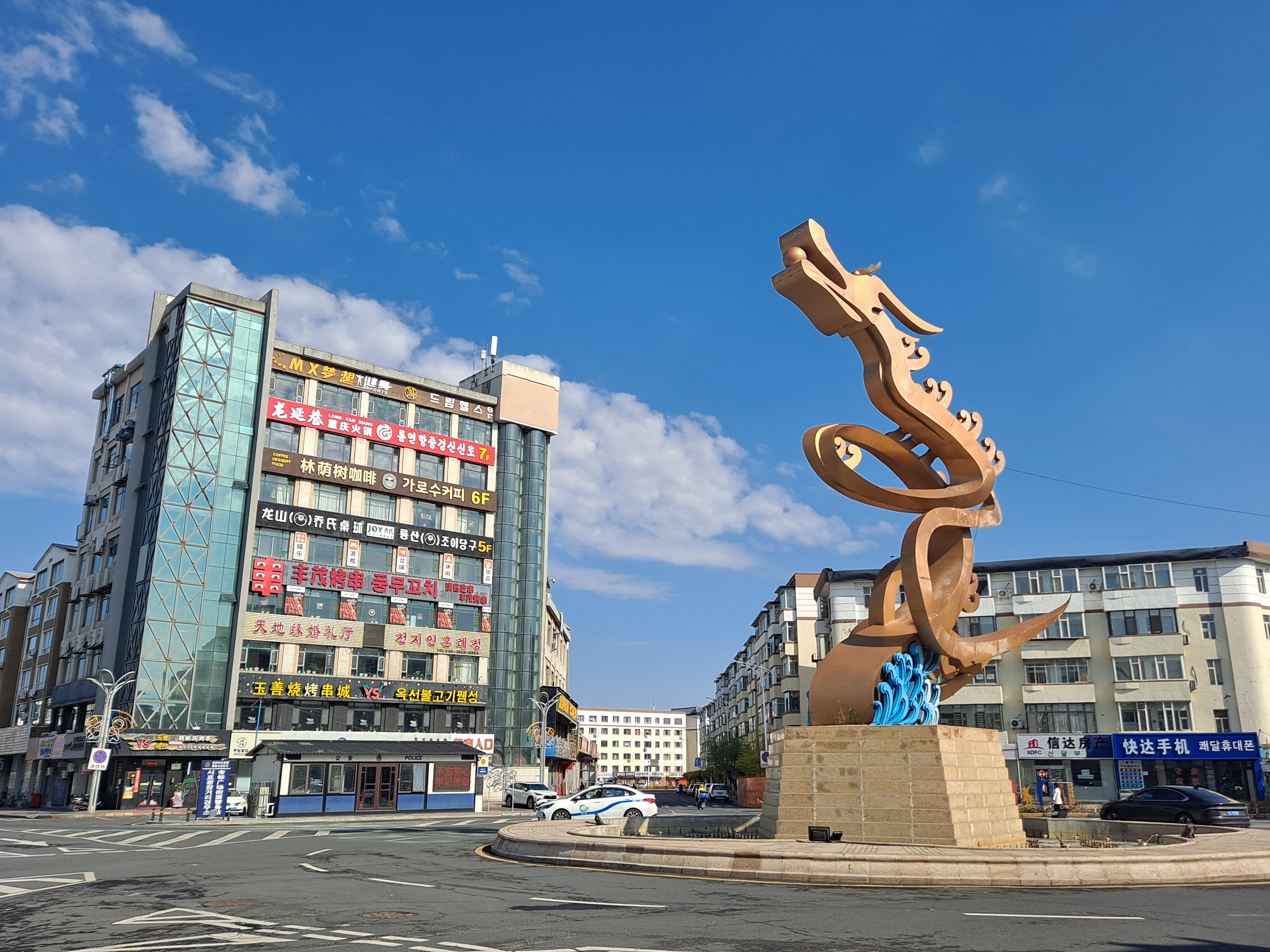

- Location in Jilin province
- Coordinates: 42°46′N 129°26′E
- Country: People's Republic of China
- Province: Jilin
- Prefecture: Yanbian
- Seat: Anmin Subdistrict

Area
  - County-level city: 2,208.0 km^{2} (852.5 sq mi)
  - Urban: 31.05 km^{2} (11.99 sq mi)
- Elevation: 266 m (873 ft)

Population (2017)
  - County-level city: 178,000
  - Density: 80.6/km^{2} (209/sq mi)
  - Urban: 117,800
- Time zone: UTC+08:00 (China Standard)

Longjing, Jilin
- Simplified Chinese: 龙井市
- Traditional Chinese: 龍井市
Transcriptions
Standard Mandarin
- Hanyu Pinyin: Lóngjǐng Shì

Chinese Korean name
- Chosŏn'gŭl: 룡정시
- Hancha: 龍井市
Transcriptions
- Revised Romanization: Ryongjeong-si
- McCune–Reischauer: Ryongjŏng-si

South Korean name
- Hangul: 룽징시
- Hanja: 룽징市
Transcriptions
- Revised Romanization: Rungjing-si
- McCune–Reischauer: Rungjing-si

Longjing (simplified Chinese: 龙井; traditional Chinese: 龍井; pinyin: Lóngjǐng; Chosŏn'gŭl: 룡정; Hangul: 룽징) is a county-level city in the Yanbian Korean Autonomous Prefecture, south-eastern Jilin province, China. It lies on the Tumen River, opposite the North Korean city Hoeryong. Longjing is "the birthplace of Chinese Korean folk culture, the area in China where Korean people live most concentratedly and where Korean folk culture is best preserved."

Its population is approximately "167,000, including 110,800 Koreans, accounting for 66.4% of the total population." It borders Yanji and Tumen City on the northeast, Helong to the southwest, and Antu County in the southwest. The border length is 142.5 kilometres (88.5 mi).

Longjing covers an area of 2,208.0 km2, with a forest coverage rate of 71.5%. It is rich in natural resources. "There are 1,072 species of wild economic plants in 124 families, including 186 species of precious medicinal plants. Wild economic animals include black bear, wild boar, Siberian roe deer, Rana chensinensis, etc." Longjing is famous for producing rice, Pyrus pyrifolia, Matsutake, red sun-cured tobacco, Yanbian cattle, and fine-wool sheep. It has the largest orchard in Asia - "万亩果园/10,000 Mu Orchard" (One "mu" is equal to 666.67 m2), the largest bear breeding base in China - "东方熊乐园/Oriental Bear Paradise" and the "吉林天佛指山国家级自然保护区/Jilin Tianfozhishan National Nature Reserve" which aims to protect Matsutake, Pinus densiflora and its ecosystem.

There is a "朝鲜族民俗博物馆/Korean Folklore Museum" in Longjing, with a total construction area of 24,800 m2. The museum building covers an area of 2,200 m2. There are more than 3,000 Korean folk cultural relics in its collection, as well as more than 800 ancient historical relics and modern cultural relics. Among them, there are 53 "national-grade relics".

Yun Dong-ju studied in Longjing.

== Administrative divisions ==
Longjing has two subdistricts, six towns and two townships:

- Subdistricts
  - Anmin Subdistrict (安民街道 / 안민가도)
  - Longmen Subdistrict (龙门街道 / 룡문가도)
- Towns
  - Chaoyangchuan (朝阳川镇 / 조양천진)
  - Dongshengyong (东盛涌镇 / 동성용진)
  - Kaishantun (开山屯镇 / 개산둔진)
  - Laotougou (老头沟镇 / 로두구진)
  - Sanhe (三合镇 / 삼합진)
  - Zhixin (智新镇 / 지신진)
- Townships
  - Baijin Township (白金乡 / 백금향)
  - Dexin Township (德新乡 /덕신향)

== Climate ==
Climate data for Longjing, elevation 242 m (794 ft), (1991–2020 normals, extremes 1981–2010)
Month	Jan	Feb	Mar	Apr	May	Jun	Jul	Aug	Sep	Oct	Nov	Dec	Year
Record high °C (°F)	6.8 (44.2)	15.1 (59.2)	20.7 (69.3)	33.1 (91.6)	33.8 (92.8)	36.7 (98.1)	37.1 (98.8)	37.0 (98.6)	32.7 (90.9)	29.3 (84.7)	19.4 (66.9)	11.6 (52.9)	37.1 (98.8)
Mean daily maximum °C (°F)	−6.2 (20.8)	−1.5 (29.3)	5.8 (42.4)	15.1 (59.2)	21.4 (70.5)	25.1 (77.2)	27.4 (81.3)	27.1 (80.8)	22.6 (72.7)	14.9 (58.8)	3.7 (38.7)	−4.6 (23.7)	12.6 (54.6)
Daily mean °C (°F)	−13.1 (8.4)	−8.5 (16.7)	−0.7 (30.7)	7.8 (46.0)	14.2 (57.6)	18.8 (65.8)	22.0 (71.6)	21.6 (70.9)	15.5 (59.9)	7.4 (45.3)	−2.5 (27.5)	−10.7 (12.7)	6.0 (42.8)
Mean daily minimum °C (°F)	−18.6 (−1.5)	−14.7 (5.5)	−6.8 (19.8)	0.9 (33.6)	7.8 (46.0)	13.6 (56.5)	17.6 (63.7)	17.2 (63.0)	9.7 (49.5)	1.1 (34.0)	−7.7 (18.1)	−15.8 (3.6)	0.4 (32.7)
Record low °C (°F)	−30.9 (−23.6)	−28.2 (−18.8)	−23.6 (−10.5)	−11.2 (11.8)	−1.8 (28.8)	5.4 (41.7)	8.9 (48.0)	7.1 (44.8)	−1.2 (29.8)	−10.8 (12.6)	−24.5 (−12.1)	−29.1 (−20.4)	−30.9 (−23.6)
Average precipitation mm (inches)	5.1 (0.20)	7.6 (0.30)	13.5 (0.53)	30.3 (1.19)	68.5 (2.70)	78.8 (3.10)	132.2 (5.20)	116.1 (4.57)	65.2 (2.57)	29.6 (1.17)	19.4 (0.76)	6.2 (0.24)	572.5 (22.53)
Average precipitation days (≥ 0.1 mm)	3.1	3.4	5.7	8.1	13.8	14.2	14.0	14.0	9.5	6.8	5.7	4.2	102.5
Average snowy days	5.6	6.1	7.3	3.0	0.2	0	0	0	0	1.6	5.9	6.8	36.5
Average relative humidity (%)	60	55	53	52	61	72	79	80	75	64	62	61	65
Mean monthly sunshine hours	170.1	180.4	210.8	205.0	211.7	198.8	182.6	187.9	207.5	198.8	153.0	150.7	2,257.3
Percentage possible sunshine	58	60	57	51	47	44	40	44	56	59	53	54	52
Source: China Meteorological Administration
