= Northeast Electric Power University =

Provincial public university in Jilin City, Jilin, China

- Type: Public
- Established: 1949
- President: Guowei Cai (蔡国伟)
- Academic staff: 800
- Undergraduates: 14,373
- Postgraduates: 4,679
- Location: Jilin, Jilin, China
- Campus: 198 acres
- Nickname: 东北电力
- Website: en.neepu.edu.cn (English)

Northeast Electric Power University (NEEPU; Chinese: 东北电力大学; pinyin: Dōngběi Diànlì Dàxué) is a provincial public university in Jilin City, Jilin, China. It is affiliated with the Province of Jilin and sponsored by the provincial government.

The university was formed in 1949 in Changchun and was moved to Jilin in 1955. It focuses on engineering and has about 19,000 full-time students.

== History ==
In 1949, NEEPU was founded in Changchun, it grew out of Changchun Electrical Machinery Advanced Professional School, which was the first school of Electrical Engineering set up by the new Republic of China.

In 1955, NEEPU moved to Jilin from Changchun.

In 1958, NEEPU became an undergraduate institute of higher learning, named Jilin Electric Power Institute.

In 1978, its name was changed to Northeast China Institute of Electric Power Engineering. Originally, the university had been under leadership of Ministry of Electric Power of the People's Republic of China.

From 2000, NEEPU has been under the management model of joint-building by the central and local governments.

Approved by the Ministry of Education of the People's Republic of China in December 2005, its name was changed to Northeast Dianli University.

In 2016, the university changed its English name to Northeast Electric Power University.
