= Yanbian University =

Public university in Yabian, Jilin, China

Coordinates: 42°54′29″N 129°29′7″E

- 延边大学 (Chinese) 연변대학 (Korean)
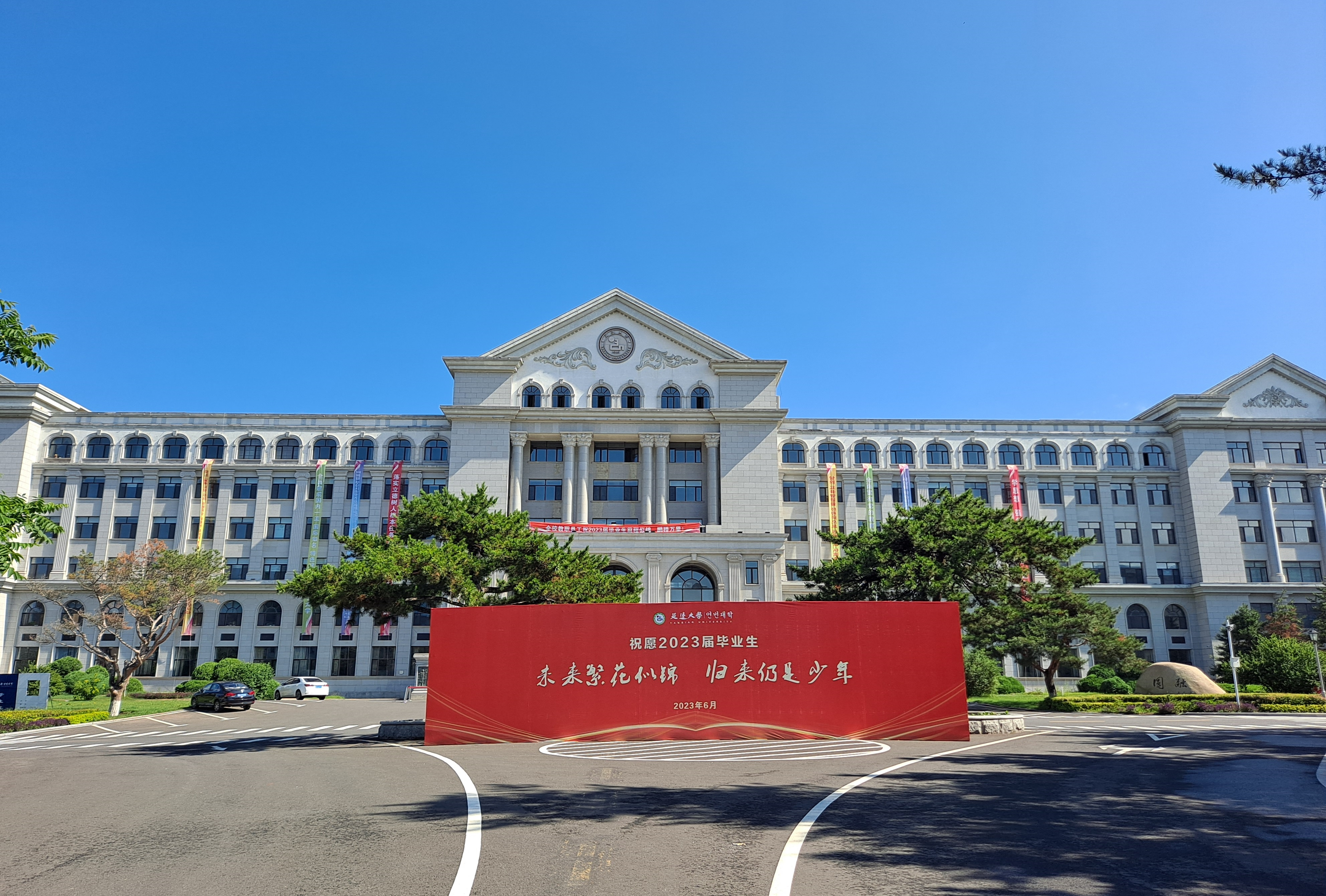
- Type: Public
- Established: 1949; 77 years ago
- Location: Yanji, Jilin, China
- Language: Chinese
- Website: www.ybu.edu.cn

Chinese name
- Simplified Chinese: 延边大学
- Traditional Chinese: 延邊大學
Transcriptions
Standard Mandarin
- Hanyu Pinyin: Yánbiān Dàxué

Chinese Korean name
- Chosŏn'gŭl: 연변대학
- Hancha: 延邊大學
Transcriptions
- Revised Romanization: Yeonbyeon Daehak
- McCune–Reischauer: Yŏnbyŏn Taehak

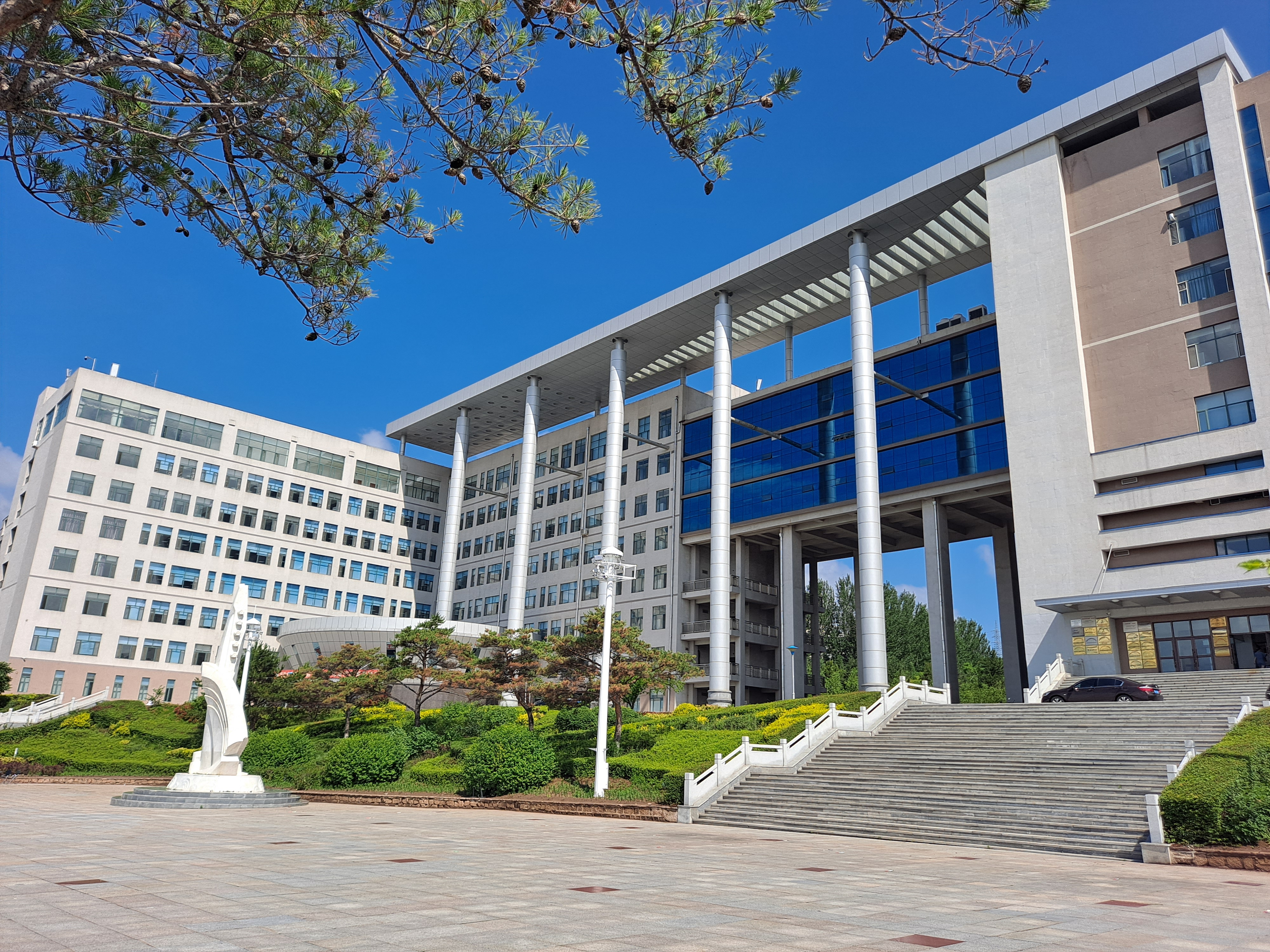
Yanbian University Library

Yanbian University (YBU; 延边大学) is a public university at Yanji, Yanbian, Jilin, China. It is affiliated with the Province of Jilin, and co-funded by the provincial government and the Ministry of Education. The university is part of Project 211 and the Double First-Class Construction.
