= Korean language in China =

Chinese Korean language
- Simplified Chinese: 中国朝鲜语
- Traditional Chinese: 中國朝鮮語
- Literal meaning: China Joseon Language
Transcriptions
Standard Mandarin
- Hanyu Pinyin: Zhōngguó Cháoxiǎnyǔ

Chinese Korean name
- Chosŏn'gŭl: 중국조선말
- Hancha: 中國朝鮮말
Transcriptions
- Revised Romanization: Jungguk Joseonmal
- McCune–Reischauer: Chungguk Chosŏnmal

The Chinese Korean language (Korean: 중국조선어; Hancha: 中國朝鮮語; RR: Jungguk Joseoneo, lit. 'China Joseon language') is the variety of the Korean language spoken by ethnic Koreans in China, primarily located in the northeastern provinces of Heilongjiang, Jilin and Liaoning, the latter two of which share borders with North Korea.

All varieties of Korean except the Jeju language are spoken by members of the Korean diaspora who settled in China before 1949. The educational standard is the North Korean standard language. Chinese Korean vocabulary is very similar to the North Korean standard, as is orthography; a major exception of orthography is that the spelling of some Chinese cities is different (for example, Hong Kong is referred to by the Sino-Korean name of 香港, 향항, Hyanghang, rather than the North and South Korean transcription of English Hongk'ong, 홍콩); exceptions of vocabulary are all related to China.

== Background ==
=== Language standardization ===
The text used in the Korean language of Yanbian was originally in Korean mixed script, which made it difficult for a large number of grassroots Korean people to read articles. In 1949, the local newspaper Northeast Korean People's Daily in Yanbian published the "workers and peasants version" which used all-hangul in text, in addition to the existing "cadre version" that had mixed script for the convenience of grassroots Korean people. Starting April 20, 1952, the newspaper abolished the "cadre version" and published in hangul only, soon the entire publishing industry adopted the hangul-only style. On June 28, 1963, Zhou Enlai instructed that the Korean language of Yanbian should be based on the Pyongyang standard of North Korea. Subsequently, the Yanbian Language and History Research Committee standardized the Korean language of Yanbian on the basis of North Korean standard. Currently, the standardized dialect of Korean amongst Chinese-Koreans is similar to that of North Korea due to China's favorable relations with North Korea, and also the proximity of the two nations.

In 1989, the GB 12052 character set standard was established for text processing on computers.

=== Regional variations ===
Yanbian Koreans primarily use Hamgyŏng dialect. Pyongan dialect is spoken by ethnic Korean communities in Liaoning, while Kyŏngsang dialect is spoken in Heilongjiang.

== Characteristics ==
=== Phonetics ===
The southwestern variant of Chinese Korean retains the [ø] pronunciation for ㅚ and [y] for (ㅟ), which have been simplified into [we] and [wi] respectively in standard Korean. The southeastern variant of Chinese Korean does not differentiate the respective pronunciations for [ɛ] (ㅐ) and [e] (ㅔ).

Additionally, in the northeast and the southeast regions of this dialect, pitch accent is used.

Chinese Korean also simplifies diphthongs in loanwords into single vowels, such as in the word 땐노 (ttaenno, "computer"; from Chinese 电脑 diànnǎo).

=== Grammar ===
The copula "-ㅂ니까/-습니까" in Standard Korean is rendered as "-ㅁ둥/-슴둥" in dialects of Korean spoken in Northeastern Jilin, and "-ㅁ니꺼/-심니꺼" in dialects spoken in Southwestern Heilongjiang.

At the same time, there are grammatical influences from Standard Chinese, for example:

- 전화 치다 "make a phone call" (Standard Korean: 전화 걸다). In Chinese, the same sentence 打电话 literally means to physically "hit" a telephone, hence the word 치다, "to hit", is used to describe making a phone call.
- 뭘 주면 뭘 먹는다 "eat whatever is given" (Standard Korean: 주는 건 다 먹는다)

=== Vocabulary ===
Vocabulary is another differentiating factor in comparison with other varieties of Korean, with usage of words such as 개구리 and 개구락지 (frog). As a result of Chinese influence, there are many words that arise from Modern Standard Chinese.

Some words arise from the eum pronunciation of hanja, for example 공인 (工人, worker, Standard Korean: 노동자, 勞動者) and 판공실 (辦公室, office, Standard Korean: 사무실, 事務室).

There are also some loanwords that are phonetically transliterated from Japanese that standard Korean does not have (probably due to influence of Manchukuo's rule):

English	Japanese	Yanbian Korean	Standard Korean
Onion	たまねぎ tamanegi	다마네기 tamanegi	양파 yangpa
Radio	ラジオ rajio	라지오 rajio	라디오 radio

== As a foreign language ==
Korean language education in China began in 1945 at the National Oriental Language College, but the Korean language department at that college was then moved into Peking University around 1949. Later on, the University of International Business and Economics, the PLA College of Foreign Language, Yanbian University, and the Beijing International Studies University also established Korean language departments. The study of Korean in China then declined until 1992, when China-South Korea relations were normalized. After that point, interest in Korean began to grow again: there were 24 Korean departments around the end of the 21st century, and 266 universities offered Korean majors as of 2017.

In an ethnographic study, Korean language learners in a bilingual school cited business connections with South Korea and the anticipation of educational success as reasons to learn Korean.
