= Sinhanch'on Incident =

1920 massacre of Koreans by Japan

The Sinhanch'on Incident (Korean: 신한촌사건; Hanja: 新韓村事件) or the April Disaster (4월참변) was a massacre of Korean civilians by Japanese soldiers in the Korean enclave Sinhanch'on, Vladivostok, Far Eastern Republic beginning on April 4, 1920. The massacre lasted for several days. It is not known how many were killed, although one estimate puts the number at several hundred.

== Background ==
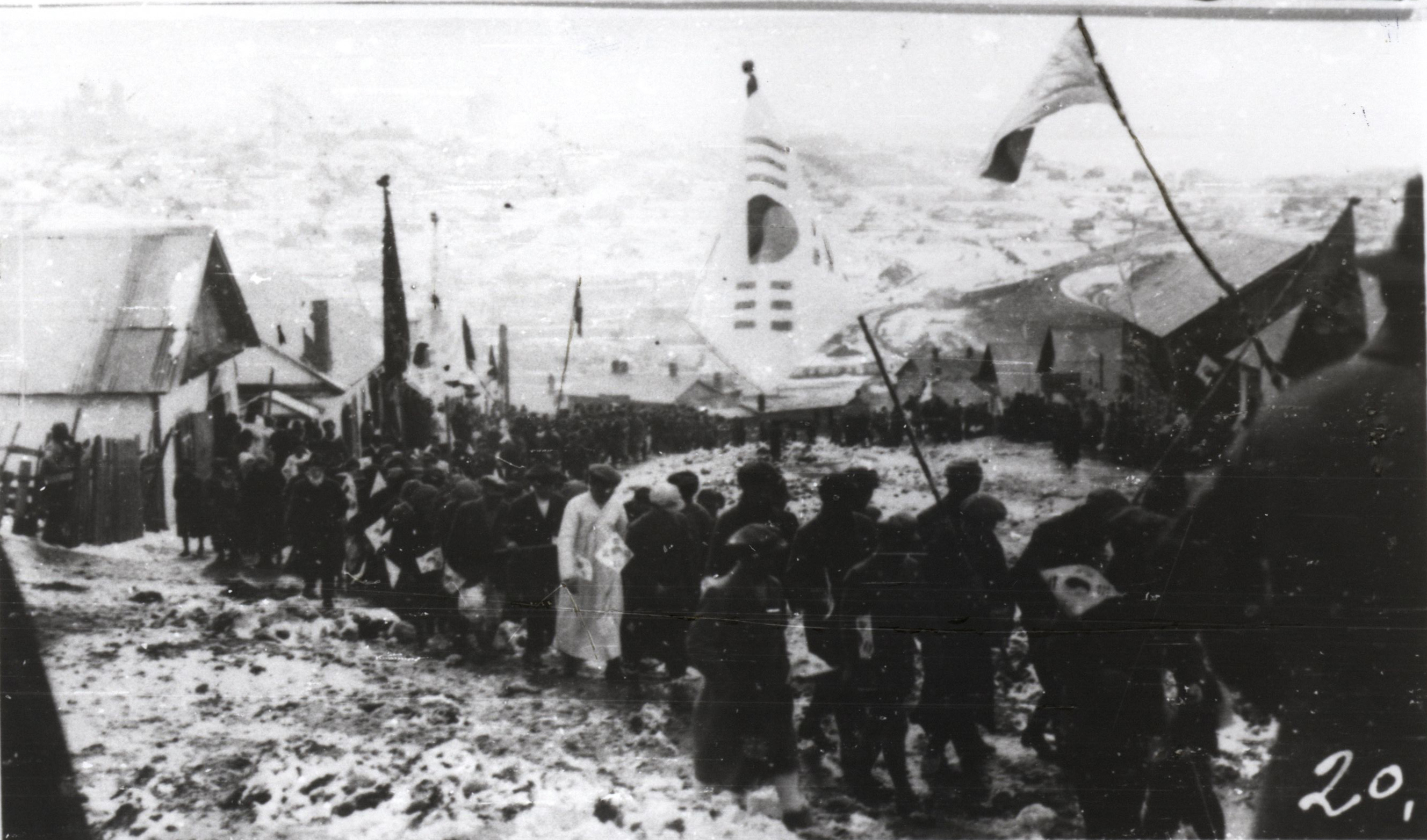
March First Movement anniversary protests in Vladivostok on March 1, 1920, a month before the massacre

Since the late 19th century, Koreans moved into the Russian Far East in search of economic opportunities. After Japan colonized Korea in 1910, the enclave Sinhanch'on in Vladivostok became a hotbed for the Korean independence movement. Famous independence activist and general Hong Beom-do used the village as his base. Other notable activists Shin Chae-ho and Choe Jae-hyeong also stayed in the village. Various institutions, including schools and newspapers, were created for the community.

When the Russian October Revolution broke out in 1917, the region became destabilized. The Bolsheviks massacred Japanese civilians and attacked military institutions. As the Koreans were generally friendly to the Bolsheviks due to sharing Japan as a mutual enemy, they became a target of retaliation.

== Description ==
Around 5 a.m. on April 4, 1920, Japanese soldiers made a surprise attack on Sinhanch'on, conducting mass arrests, killing civilians, and burning down buildings. The number of civilian deaths is unknown. Japanese records record arrests of 60 Koreans, but a Korean source records more than 300 arrests. Arrested Koreans were tortured for information about independence activists. An account of a survivor reports that Korean civilians were dragged into the office of a local Korean newspaper and kept in there. The building was then set on fire, which killed the occupants. Korean possessions were looted and a Korean school was burnt down. The attack continued until 8 a.m. After a pause, the Japanese returned around 4 p.m. and continued their attack. They attacked again on the following day.

Numerous Koreans fled Sinhanch'on, with some making their way to Shanghai to join the Provisional Government of the Republic of Korea. Similar attacks on Korean civilians occurred in Ussuriysk. Choe Jae-hyeong was captured there by the Japanese, and eventually executed by firing squad.

== Legacy ==
In August 1999, a memorial was set up to the Korean independence movement in Sinhanch'on by the Institute of Koreans Abroad (해외한민족연구소).

== See also ==
- Big suppression operation against South Korea
- Free City Incident – A subsequent related Soviet–Korea conflict
- Gando massacre
- Hailan River massacre
- Hainan mass grave
- Imperial Japanese massacre against Donghak Peasant Movement
- Imperial Japanese massacre against March First Movement
- Japanese war crimes
- Kamishisuka massacre
- Mizuho massacre
