= Mao'ershan National Forest Park =

Forest park in Yanji, China

- 帽儿山国家森林公园
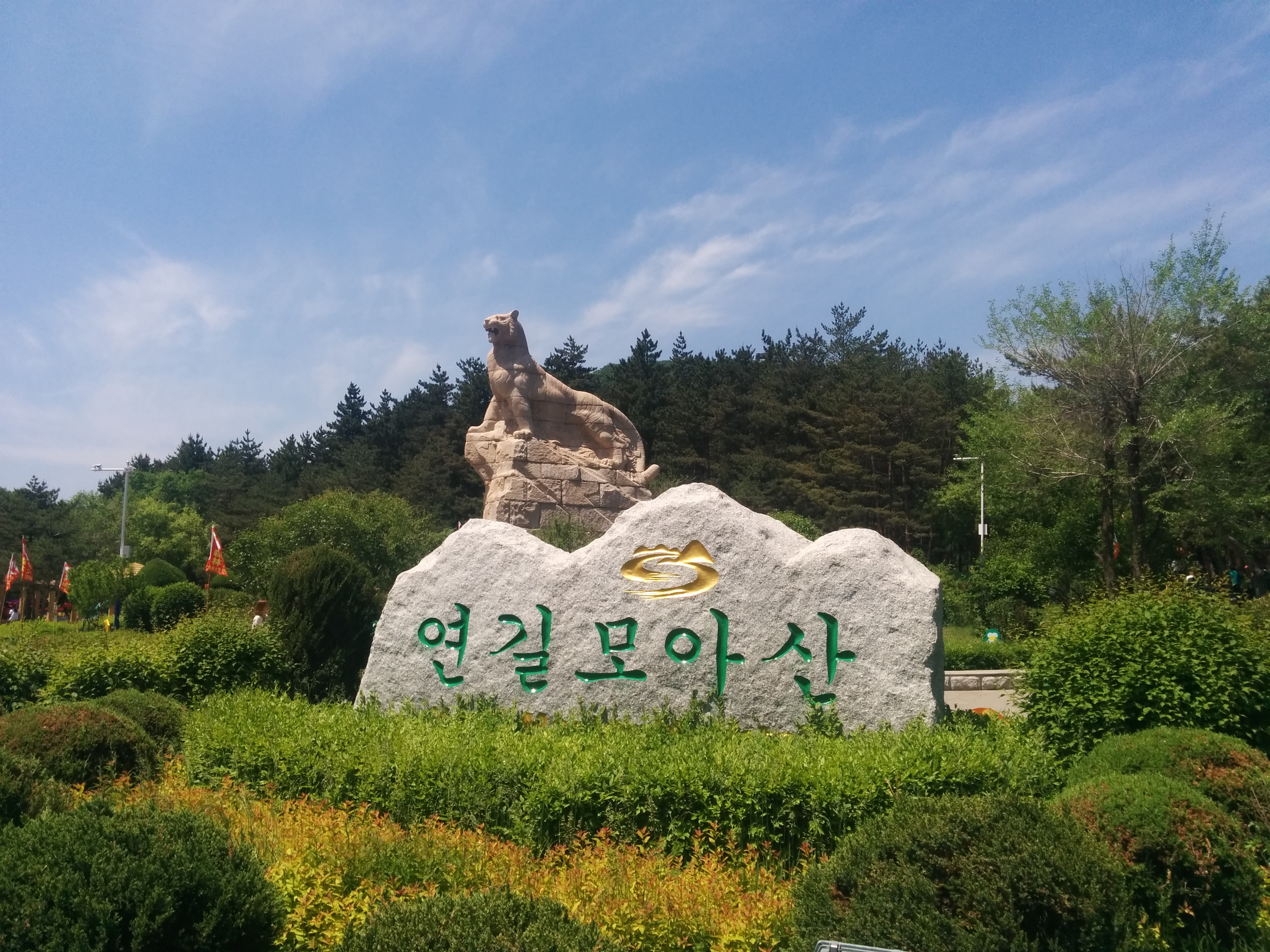
- Mao'ershan National Forest Park.

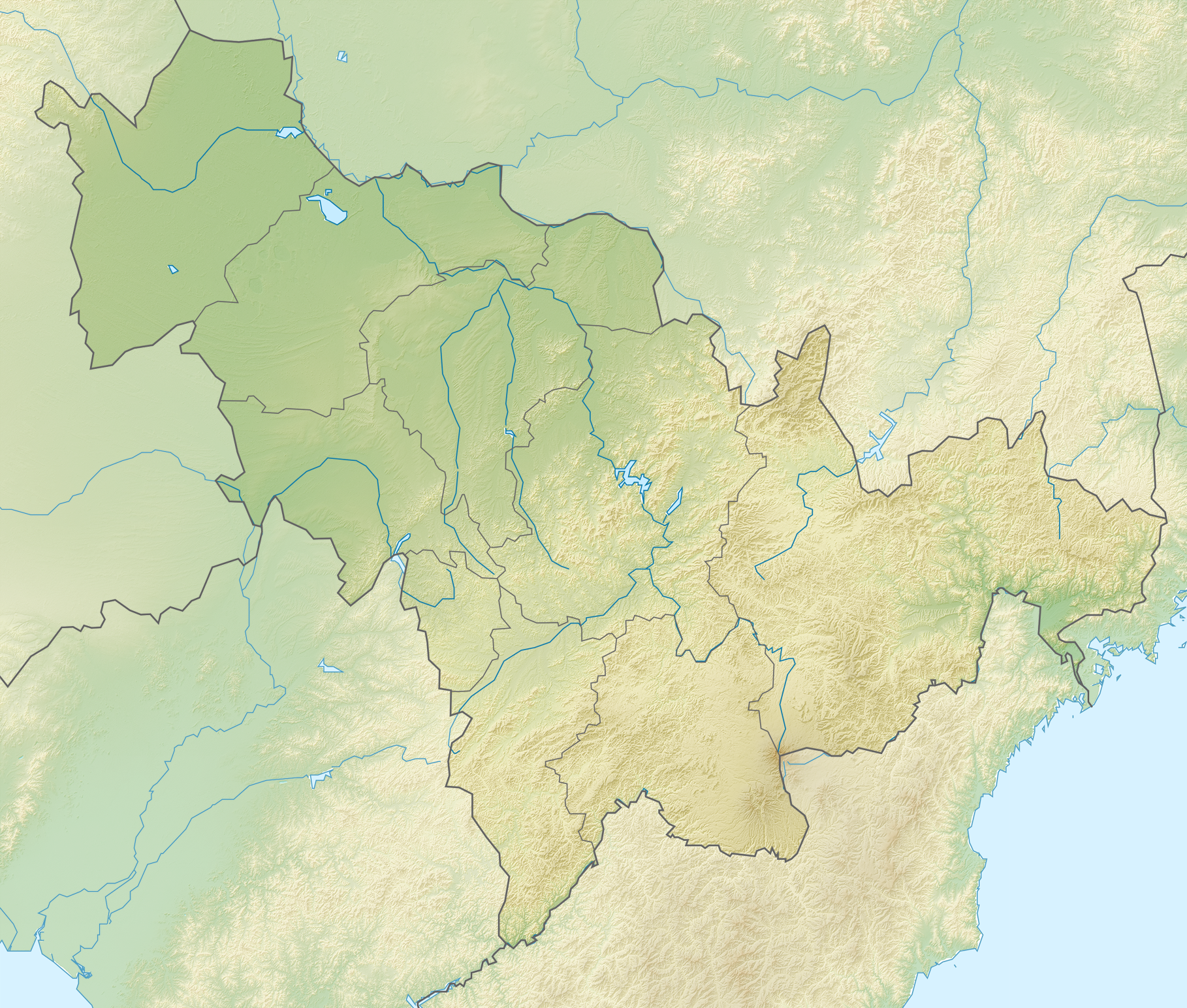
- Location within Jilin
- Type: Public park, state park
- Location: Yanji, Jilin
- Coordinates: 42°51′40″N 129°28′32″E
- Area: 11-square-kilometre (4.2 sq mi)
- Created: 1992
- Operator: Jilin Provincial Government
- Open: All year

Chinese name
- Simplified Chinese: 帽儿山国家森林公园
- Traditional Chinese: 帽兒山國家森林公園
Transcriptions
Standard Mandarin
- Hanyu Pinyin: Máo'érshān Guójiā Sēnlín Gōngyuán

Chinese Korean name
- Chosŏn'gŭl: 모아산국가삼림공원
Transcriptions
- Revised Romanization: Moasan Gukga Samnim Gongwon
- McCune–Reischauer: Moasan Kukka Samnim Kongwŏn

The Mao'ershan National Forest Park (Chinese: 帽儿山国家森林公园; Korean: 모아산국가삼림공원) is a national forest park located in Yanji, Jilin, China. It covers an area of 11-square-kilometre (4.2 sq mi). Located in the southern suburbs of Yanji, it is bordered by the Buerhatong River and Hailan River. Its main peak is 517.3-metre (1,697 ft) above sea level.

== History ==
In November 1992 it was classified as a "National Forest Park" by the State Forestry Administration.

== See also ==
- List of protected areas of China
