= Mizuho massacre =

1945 massacre of Koreans in Karafuto

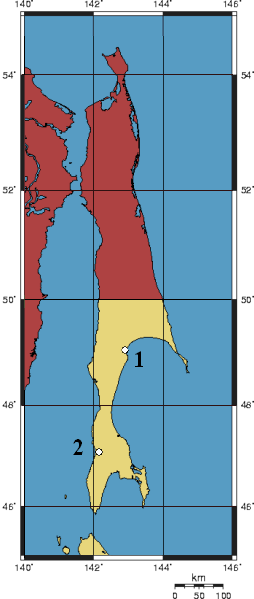
- Massacre Locations; 1. Shisuka-chō (Poronaysk, 敷香町) 2. Maoka-chō (Pozharskoye, 真岡町)
- Location: Imperial Japan Karafuto Prefecture Maoka (마오카군, 真岡郡) Shimizu (시미즈촌, 清水村)
- Date: August 20, 1945 – August 23, 1945
- Attack type: Massacre
- Deaths: 27 civilian deaths
- Inquiry: unknown
- Convictions: Death sentence sought for Japanese leaders of the massacre

The Mizuho massacre (미즈호 학살 사건 (Korean), 瑞穂事件(みずほじけん) (Japanese), Резня в Мидзухо (Russian)), or the Mizuho Village massacre, was a mass murder incident that occurred from August 20 to 23, 1945, in Shimizu Village, Maoka District, Karafuto Prefecture. At the time, it was the final stages of World War II—specifically, not long after Imperial Japan's official surrender—and the Soviet-Japanese War was underway following the Potsdam Declaration. An official investigation into the incident was conducted after the Soviet Union completely occupied Sakhalin Island and the Kuril Islands, and two Japanese individuals, the main perpetrators of the massacre, were convicted.

== Background ==
On August 11, 1945, the Imperial Japan, which had signed the Soviet–Japanese Neutrality Pact, faced an unexpected Soviet invasion of South Sakhalin at the end of World War II. Soviet forces continued their offensive against Sakhalin even after Imperial Japan's surrender. At the time, Karafuto Prefecture was considered a rear area within Imperial Japan, so it was not properly prepared for defense against Soviet attacks.

== Massacre ==
In Sakhalin, Koreans who were not natives were forcibly brought by the Imperial Japanese army against their will for the purpose of forced labor and were working in mines, whaling farms, sawmills, and other facilities.

Around August 1945, Imperial Japanese soldiers stationed in Sakhalin began to indiscriminately kill Koreans. After brutally murdering one Korean, the Sakhalin garrison planned to massacre all other Koreans residing on the island. Hiroshi Hosokawa, who participated in the massacre, later testified at a Soviet military tribunal that they had identified Koreans attempting to escape en masse and killed all 27 people, including them, regardless of whether they were women, children, or the elderly.

At the time, a form of intelligence warfare was taking place on Sakhalin Island. The Imperial Japanese army was using Ainu, Oroks, and Nivkh people as spies to infiltrate Soviet-controlled Sakhalin, but they were not utilizing Koreans as spies. Even for the Soviet military, Koreans were indistinguishable from the Japanese, making it difficult to distinguish them. The Japanese residents of Mizuho village began to frame the Koreans they had forcibly brought there as Soviet spies, and exploiting the situation to their advantage, they massacred the villagers. According to materials later revealed by Professor Gilseong Choe (최길성), it was discovered that this massacre occurred because the Japanese residents of Sakhalin at the time were already armed with firearms and swords.

The Soviet Union completely occupied Sakhalin and proceeded with investigations and trials regarding this massacre. After the trial held in Vladivostok concluded, a total of seven Japanese individuals involved in the killings were sentenced to death. These facts came to light as secret KGB documents were declassified.

Currently, a memorial monument stands at the site of the massacre, bearing an inscription in both Korean and Russian.

== Investigatioin ==
The Mainichi Shimbun obtained and deciphered classified Soviet documents, confirming that several massacres of Koreans by Japanese people in Sakhalin occurred between August and September 1945. Along with the Mizuho massacre, other incidents were brought to light, including the Kamishisuka massacre (or Ueshika massacre). On August 15, 1945, the day of Liberation Day, a Korean man residing in Ujo (Oroo) was accused of being a spy for sending a telegram during a Soviet air raid; he was shot eight times by Imperial Japanese soldiers and stabbed 27 times with a sword by Japanese residents, resulting in his death. On the same day in Sankoro (Nerpich), a Korean man belonging to the Korean Male Labor Service Corps was executed by firing squad for demanding weapons. In early September 1945, a Korean man died by firing squad for betraying a Imperial Japanese army arsenal to the Soviet army. All of these incidents were investigated by the Soviet military, alongside the interrogation of the Imperial Japanese soldiers involved and the examination of the bodies of Koreans.

Although there are no precise statistics, it is estimated that at least several dozen to several hundred people were killed.

According to the Mainichi Shimbun, Soviet military testimonies and records indicate that rumors began circulating in the village that Koreans were Soviet spies. Former soldiers residing in Mizuho village and local residents agreed to target Korean men, women, and children for murder. Following the incident, the Soviet military referred 18 suspects to a military court in 1946, sent seven to death and 11 to 10-year prison terms, and sent them to Siberian prisons. Of the 11 serving prison sentences, three are known to have died while incarcerated.

== See also ==
- Gando Massacre
- Hailan River massacre
- Hainan mass grave
- Japanese war crimes
- Kamishisuka massacre
- Kantō Massacre
- Massacre against March First Movement
- Nanjing Massacre
- Sakhalin Koreans
