= Kamishisuka massacre =

1945 massacre of Koreans in Karafuto

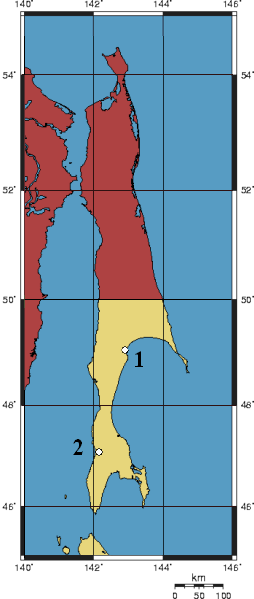
- Massacre Locations; 1. Shisuka-chō (Poronaysk, 敷香町) 2. Maoka-chō (Pozharskoye, 真岡町)
- Location: Imperial Japan Karafuto Prefecture Shisuka-chō (敷香町) Shisuka town
- Date: August 17, 1945 – August 18, 1945
- Attack type: Massacre
- Deaths: 18 civilian deaths
- Perpetrator: Imperial Japanese police
- Inquiry: unknown
- Convictions: Criminal charges against 7 Imperial Japanese police officers who led the massacre acknowledged

The Kamishisuka massacre (가미시스카 학살 사건 (Korean), 上敷香虐殺事件(かみしすかじけん) (Japanese), Расстрел в Камисикуке (Russian)) was a mass slaughter perpetrated by Imperial Japanese police against Koreans in Sakhalin on August 18, 1945.

== Background ==
On August 11, 1945, the Imperial Japan, which had signed the Soviet–Japanese Neutrality Pact, faced an unexpected Soviet invasion of South Sakhalin at the end of World War II. Soviet forces continued their offensive against Sakhalin even after Imperial Japan's surrender. At the time, Karafuto Prefecture was considered a rear area within Imperial Japan, so it was not properly prepared for defense against Soviet attacks.

== Massacre ==
As Soviet forces advanced from Northern Sakhalin to Kamishisuka in Shisuka-chō, Karafuto Prefecture, Imperial Japan issued a retreat order to Kamishisuka village on the evening of August 16. On August 17, the residents of Kamishisuka village set out on a truck-based evacuation route toward southern Karafuto Prefecture. Koreans were not included in the retreat from Kamishisuka village. The Imperial Japanese army handed over the Koreans to the Imperial Japanese military police, and the reason they were handed over at the time was that they were Soviet spies. The Imperial Japanese military police executed all the Koreans at the police station without any proper investigation or interrogation. The Imperial Japanese military police then set fire to the police station. During this process, a Korean man with the Japanese name Nagata managed to make a dramatic escape through the restroom.

Following the Imperial Japanese military police's arson of the police station, the Soviet Air Force carried out a bombing raid on the building. While investigating the wreckage, Soviet troops discovered 18 bodies, which bore multiple wounds from firing squads and swords. According to residents of a nearby village, they heard screams coming from inside the police station. According to the testimony of a Korean family, all 18 detainees were handcuffed and shackled, making escape impossible, and one member of the Imperial Japanese military police shouted loudly at the imprisoned Koreans. Another testimony states that an elderly Korean man attempted to escape through the restroom but fell into a septic tank and failed; his blackened body was indeed found in the septic tank. It is presumed that some of the imprisoned Koreans were burned alive.

The victims of the Kamishisuka massacre were arrested by a pro-Japanese informant of Korean origin who was collaborating with the Imperial Japanese military police. This Korean informant was brought before a Soviet military court on charges of anti-Soviet activities and sentenced to imprisonment, and seven officers of the Imperial Japanese Military Police were also found guilty.

For a long time, it was unknown where these 18 Koreans were buried after their execution. The Koreans in Sakhalin later erected a memorial at the site where the massacre took place to honor the spirits of the deceased. This location is currently the village of Leonidovo in Poronaisk.

In addition to Kamishisuka, massacres against Koreans also occurred in the villages of Mizuho, Ushikoro, and Chirikoro.

== Current ==
In August 1991, the families of the victims of the Kamishisuka massacre filed a lawsuit against the Japanese government for damages, demanding compensation and a sincere apology. However, on July 27, 1995, the Tokyo District Court dismissed the lawsuit, ruling that the statute of limitations had expired. On August 7, 1996, the Tokyo High Court also dismissed the plaintiff's lawsuit, and the trial ended.

== See also ==
- Gando Massacre
- Hailan River massacre
- Hainan mass grave
- Japanese war crimes
- Kantō Massacre
- Massacre against March First Movement
- Mizuho massacre
- Nanjing Massacre
- Sakhalin Koreans
