= Dancheon Forestry Association massacre =

Massacre in Dancheon, Korea

The Dancheon Forestry Association massacre (단천 삼림조합 사건, 端川森林組合事件) refers to a large-scale demonstration staged by farmers in Dancheon, South Hamgyong Province, in July 1930, in protest against the Forestry Law enacted by Imperial Japan in 1911. This law imposed heavy membership fees on farmers owning forests and required them to obtain permission from the Forestry Association and pay a fee even to harvest forest products from privately owned forests.

== Summary ==
An incident occurred in which a forest guard in Hada-myeon (하다면, 何多面), Dancheon, assaulted a pregnant woman on charges of illegal logging. Enraged by this, farmers stormed the township office. In connection with this incident, 53 ringleaders, including leaders of the farmers' movement in Hada-myeon, were arrested by the Imperial Japanese police. On July 20, 1930, leaders of the Dancheon Peasant League and the Dancheon Youth League held a county-citizen rally in Dancheon-eup to oppose the Forestry Association. Thousands of farmers attending the rally demanded the dissolution of the Forestry Association and the release of the detainees. When the county magistrate refused, they stormed the county office and subsequently attacked the police station. Although the situation was calmed after police opened fire, resulting in 16 deaths and hundreds of arrests, protests continued for some time afterward.

The Chosun Ilbo published an article on July 21, 1930, reporting the following:

"Residents of Yeondae-ri(연대리, 蓮臺里), Hada-myeon, who had been complaining that the Dancheon Forestry Association's crackdown on logging for firewood and charcoal was too harsh, were enraged by the abusive language of a certain association branch employee and a certain Japanese national. They swarmed the township office to protest, but the violence was so severe—including township officials throwing bicycles and causing injuries—that the residents resisted by destroying the office and beating township officials and police officers, resulting in a horrific scene. At this time, the crowd shouted 'Long live Korea!' The police substation reported this to the main station, and with the reinforcement of about 20 officers, efforts were made to suppress the unrest. However, arrests began at 4 a.m. this morning, and 40 people were apprehended. Consequently, hundreds of men and women swarmed the police station, demanding unconditional release and refusing to disperse, making the situation extremely critical."

== See also ==
- Gando massacre
- Hailan River massacre
- Japanese war crimes
- Kantō Massacre
- Massacre against March First Movement
- Nanjing Massacre
