= Big suppression operation against South Korea =

1909 Japanese military operation in the Korean Empire

Big suppression operation against South Korea 南韓大討伐作戰
Date	1909
Location	Honam region of Korean Empire
Result	Success of the Japanese Empire's suppression of the Righteous armies; Disappearance of organized armed anti-Japanese struggle on the Korean Peninsula; Succession of the armed anti-Japanese struggle by the Korean Independence Army in the Manchuria region

Belligerents
Jeongmi Righteous armies	Imperial Japan

Strength
Jeongmi Righteous armies	Imperial Japanese army infantry·military police Imperial Japanese Navy

Casualties and losses
over 17,000 deaths	Imperial Japan claims 8 death Righteous armies claims 136 deaths and 277 injured

The Big suppression operation against South Korea (南韓大討伐作戰) was a punitive operation established by the Imperial Japan to suppress Righteous armies resisting in South Jeolla Province and its outskirts within the Korean Empire, spanning approximately two months from September 1 to October 30, 1909. The Imperial Japanese designation for this operation was the Big suppression operation against South Korean insurgent.

== Background ==
Following the dissolution of the Korean Empire's army in 1907, the activities of the Righteous armies expanded nationwide as disbanded soldiers joined the Righteous armies. Consequently, the approximately two-year period from 1907 to the first half of 1909 was the time when the most intense struggles unfolded across the country.

From 1907 to 1909, the number of battles fought by the Righteous armies against the Imperial Japanese army reached approximately 2,700, and the number of participating soldiers alone amounted to about 40,000. This Righteous armies struggle was active nationwide, centered around Hanseong, and the Righteous armies war continued vigorously across the country. Imperial Japan decided to conduct a large-scale military operation in the Honam region, where Righteous armies activity was strong, from September 1 to October 10, 1909, but due to fierce resistance, it was extended until October 30.

== Development ==
It was only in 1909 that Righteous armies activities began to unfold, and by this time, other regions had naturally been suppressed by Imperial Japan. Starting in September 1909, the operation to wipe out the Righteous armies in the Jeolla region began. Consequently, starting September 1, 1909, for approximately two months, the Imperial Japan launched a massive crackdown on the South Jeolla region—the area where Righteous armies were most violent—under the name of the so-called "Big suppression operation against South Korean insurgent".

Mobilizing over 2,000 regular troops, the Imperial Japan suppressed the Righteous armies in the South Jeolla region through a three-stage operation. The first stage targeted the outer zones extending from Namwon in North Jeolla Province to Goheung, Gwangju, and Yeonggwang; the second stage targeted the zone extending from the vicinity of Goheung, Gwangju, and Yeonggwang to the southwestern coast; and the third stage was a so-called "scorched earth operation" that even targeted uninhabited islands to annihilate Righteous armies attempting to escape to the western part of South Jeolla Province.

Utilizing their overwhelming firepower, the Imperial Japanese army employed brutal methods, mercilessly slaughtering civilians and their homes, setting fires, and even engaging in looting, resulting in the massacre of countless civilians and innocent people.

During this process, 103 Righteous armies commanders alone were killed. Among them, 23, including Haesan Jeon, were arrested by the Imperial Japanese army and martyred at the execution grounds. At this time, the Righteous armies soldiers captured by the Imperial Japanese army were subjected to forced labor; a representative example was their forced labor on the road construction from Gwangyang to Hadong, passing through Haenam, Jangheung, Boseong, Nakan, and Suncheon. Later, the Imperial Japanese army named this road the "Rebel Road" (暴徒道路).

After the suppression of the Righteous armies, Japanese photographer Seiyo Yamamoto published the "Commemorative Photo Album of the Big suppression operation against South Korean insurgent" (南韓暴徒大討伐記念寫眞帖) in Tokyo on April 5, 1910. This contains photographs of the 16 Honam Righteous armies commanders taken prior to their execution and other materials. In 2023, original photographs of the Honam Righteous armies commanders were discovered.

== See also ==
- Gando massacre
- Hailan River massacre
- Hainan mass grave
- Imperial Japanese massacre against Donghak Peasant Movement
- Imperial Japanese massacre against March First Movement
- Japanese war crimes
- Righteous armies
- Shinhanchon massacre
