= Yeongil =

Yeongil may also refer to:

- Yeon-gil, Chinese Korean transliteration name of Yanji
- Yeongil, old name of Pohang
