= Hunchun incident =

1920 anti-Japanese raid in Manchuria

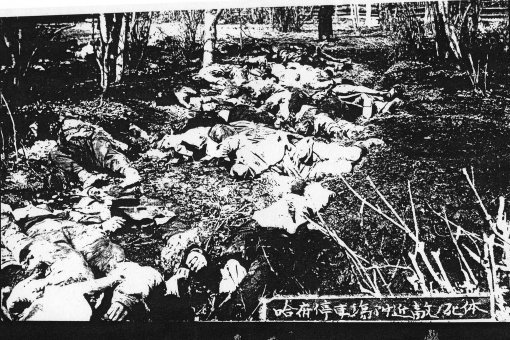
Bodies of the enemy around Khabarovsk station, n.d.

The Hunchun incident (Korean: 훈춘 사건; Hanja: 琿春事件) was a reported raid on 2 October 1920 at a Japanese consulate in Manchuria. It reportedly resulted in the death of thirteen Japanese. The Japanese government used this incident to justify sending thousands of Imperial Japanese troops into Manchuria on 5 October 1920. These escalations culminated with the Battle of Qingshanli (21–26 October 1920) between Japan and the Korean Independence Army, where Korean rebels fought Japanese soldiers.

== Background ==
For more than a decade prior to Korea's March 1st Movement (1919), nationalist groups of Korean rebels, many of whom were former soldiers in the Korean Army, organized into various pro-independence factions in Manchuria. Its strategic location across the Korean border allowed guerilla fighters to launch effective raids on Japanese consular police stations and then to retreat to the Chinese side of the boundary. For example, Hong Pomdo, a previous Righteous Army leader)l, created the Korean Independence Army and trained so-called independence fighters in Yanji. Additionally, the Northern Route Military Headquarters was established under the leadership of So Il, with Kim Chwajin commanding more than four hundred independence fighters at its officer training school. Separately, Yi Tonghwi also trained over 3,000 independence fighters in Hunchun and armed them with weapons provided by the Bolshevik Army.

Responding to the March 1st Movement's failure to secure independence and arouse international sentiments toward the Koreans' plight under Japanese colonial rule, disaffected Koreans came together on 13 April 1919 in Shanghai to form a republican Korean provisional government in the hope of working together with the independence factions in Manchuria and eventually obtaining freedom from Japan.

As the momentum behind Korean independence movements in Manchuria increased, the Japanese consular police chief Suematsu Kichiji became increasingly concerned about increasing radical Bolshevism among Koreans. To try to suppress those movements, he ordered numerous illegal police raids on suspected radical Jiandao base camps, which were protested by local Chinese leaders. It is clear that some of the Korean guerrilla fighters in Manchuria were influenced by leftist ideologies, the major factions primarily supported the Shanghai Provisional Government and were focused on Korean independence and self-determination.

Angered by the Japanese suppression of the 1 March Movement, Korean independence fighters in Manchuria began increasing their raids against Japanese border posts, killing numerous Japanese guards, and had the eventual goal of advancing into Korea to remove the Japanese. During the early summer months of 1920, Korean rebels fought with Japanese troops in 32 battles along the border. After one particular Japanese counterattack, Hong Pomdo's forces had surrounded and killed 120 Japanese soldiers and wounded more than 200.

== Attack and controversy ==
In an effort to contain the Korean rebels, Japan petitioned both Tokyo and the Chinese government to help but received little assistance. On 2 October 1920, a Japanese consulate in the Chinese city of Hunchun in Jilin Province was attacked and burned to the ground. According to Japanese sources, the perpetrators were the Korean Independence Army, and the attack killed thirteen Japanese. It was further reported that the "bandits" carrying out the attack "committed indiscriminate acts of murder and pillage" and "looted local shops."

Many South Korean historians maintain, however, that the attack on Hunchun was not carried out by the Korean rebels but rather was staged by the Japanese to justify incursion into Manchuria. Some South Korean sources further believe that the attack was coordinated with the Chinese bandit leader Ch'ang-chiang-hao, who had been bribed by the Japanese to carry out the attack with several bandits to incriminate the Koreans. The sources maintain that Chang went further than the Japanese had requested him in the scale of his attack. Other South Korean scholars even maintain that the entire incident was a complete Japanese fabrication.

North Korea is likewise skeptical about the Japanese narrative of the incident, with official sources recently asserting that "the Japanese imperialists cooked up the 'Hunchun incident' in which they hurled mounted bandits into attacking their consulate and kicked up a wholesale whirlwind of suppression against Koreans in Northeast China under that pretext."

It is difficult for historians to determine who was behind the attack or whether the incident actually took place, the controversial event is historically significant because Japan used it to justify its escalated military intervention in Manchuria. Japan petitioned and received permission from China to send 15,000 troops from the 19th Division of the Chosen Army of Japan to contain the Korean rebel armies in Jilin province.

== Aftermath ==
In reaction to the Hunchun incident, the Japanese punitive Jiandao Expedition was accordingly sent to Manchuria, and used search-and-destroy patrols to suppress the guerrilla fighters by carrying out numerous arrests and executions. By December 1920, a Korean Commission report described that Japanese soldiers had burned down 32 villages and killed "all the male inhabitants of the [Hunchun] district, and massacred 145 peaceful inhabitants." One house was reportedly burned down with "women and children inside." This is called the Gando Massarce.

Korean independence forces in Manchuria were never effectively organized under the leadership of the Shanghai Provisional Government, but they achieved notable military victories against the Japanese brigades. The most significant one was the Battle of Qingshanli in which about 400 Korean rebels defeated the better-trained Japanese for four days of intense combat. In the battle, the Koreans killed about 1,200 Japanese soldiers and lost only 60 of their own. However, according to Japanese records, 11 soldiers were killed in action, and 24 were wounded.

In early 1921, after a series of skirmishes and retreats on both sides, as well as criticism from local Chinese authorities and the international community, most members of the 19th Division withdrew from eastern Manchuria. Some of the socialist-leaning Korean rebels were then recruited by the Bolshevik Army to assist in the Russian Civil War prior to the formation of the Soviet Union.
