= Hailan River massacre =

Massacre committed by the Imperial Japanese army

The Hailan River massacre is a massacre committed by the Imperial Japanese army and Manchukuo army in the early 1930s in the Hailan River area.

== Background ==
In the early 1930s, the Chinese Communist Party's organization in East Manchuria organized the Chinese Communist Party's Hailan District Committee in Hwayeon-ri (화연리), located northeast of the confluence of the Hailan River and the Bu'erhatong River. Following the Mukden Incident in 1931, the peasants of Hailan District organized anti-Japanese guerrilla units under the leadership of the Chinese Communist Party and actively waged an anti-Japanese struggle. In response, the Imperial Japanese army dispatched troops and, in alliance with the Manchukuo army and others, carried out a large-scale suppression campaign against the Hailan River region.

== Massacre ==
From October 1931 to December 1932, the Imperial Japanese army and the Manchukuo army carried out 94 punitive expeditions against Hailan District in Yanji County, centered around Hwayeon-ri, massacring approximately 1,700 people, including Communist Party members, anti-Japanese forces, and civilians. Representative examples are as follows:

On the 7th day of the 8th lunar month of 1932, about 70 members of the Imperial Japanese garrison and self-defense corps surrounded Yujeong Village (유정촌) in Hwayeon-ri, which had only nine households, armed with three heavy machine guns, light machine guns, and one cannon. They went from house to house, setting fires and killing residents indiscriminately. The victims at this time included 28 Party members and about 20 farmers. In particular, at the house of Samdal Lee (이삼달), where an anti-Japanese guerrilla unit was stationed, about 19 family members were killed. Among them were a two-year-old child and a grandmother in her 70s. Thus, Yujeong Village became a sea of blood due to the indiscriminate massacre by the Imperial Japanese army. This was the so-called "August 7 Massacre."

On the 12th day of the 12th lunar month of the same year, the self-defense unit of Hadong in Yanji County, along with the Imperial Japanese garrison stationed in Yanji and the Manchukuo police, launched another punitive expedition in Hwayeon-ri. They arrested five anti-Japanese guerrillas who were receiving treatment for typhoid fever and burned them to death. They also buried dozens of anti-Japanese civilians alive.

== Aftermath ==
After the defeat of Imperial Japan in 1945, Yanbian held a rally to settle accounts for the Hailan River massacre in October 1946 and judged those responsible for the crimes committed against their compatriots.

The Hailan River massacre was one of the largest massacres committed by the Imperial Japanese army in Yanbian.

== See also ==
- Big suppression operation against South Korea
- Gando Massacre
- Hainan mass grave
- Imperial Japanese massacre against Donghak Peasant Movement
- Imperial Japanese massacre against March First Movement
- Japanese war crimes
- Kantō Massacre
- Nanjing Massacre
- Shinhanchon massacre

== Sources ==
- Hwan Bak (박환) (2014). 만주 지역 한인 민족 운동의 재발견 (in Korean). 국학 자료원. ISBN 9788927903758.
- Donghwa Gim (김동화), Cheolsu Gim (김철수), Changyeok Yi (이창역), Gisong O (오기송) (1988). 연변 당사 사건과 인물 (in Korean). 연변인민출판사.
- Seongchun Choe (최성춘) (1999). 연변 인민 항일 투쟁사 (in Korean). Beijing: 민족 출판사. ISBN 9787105036813.
