= Hailan River =

River in Jilin, China

Coordinates: 42°54′20″N 129°36′51″E

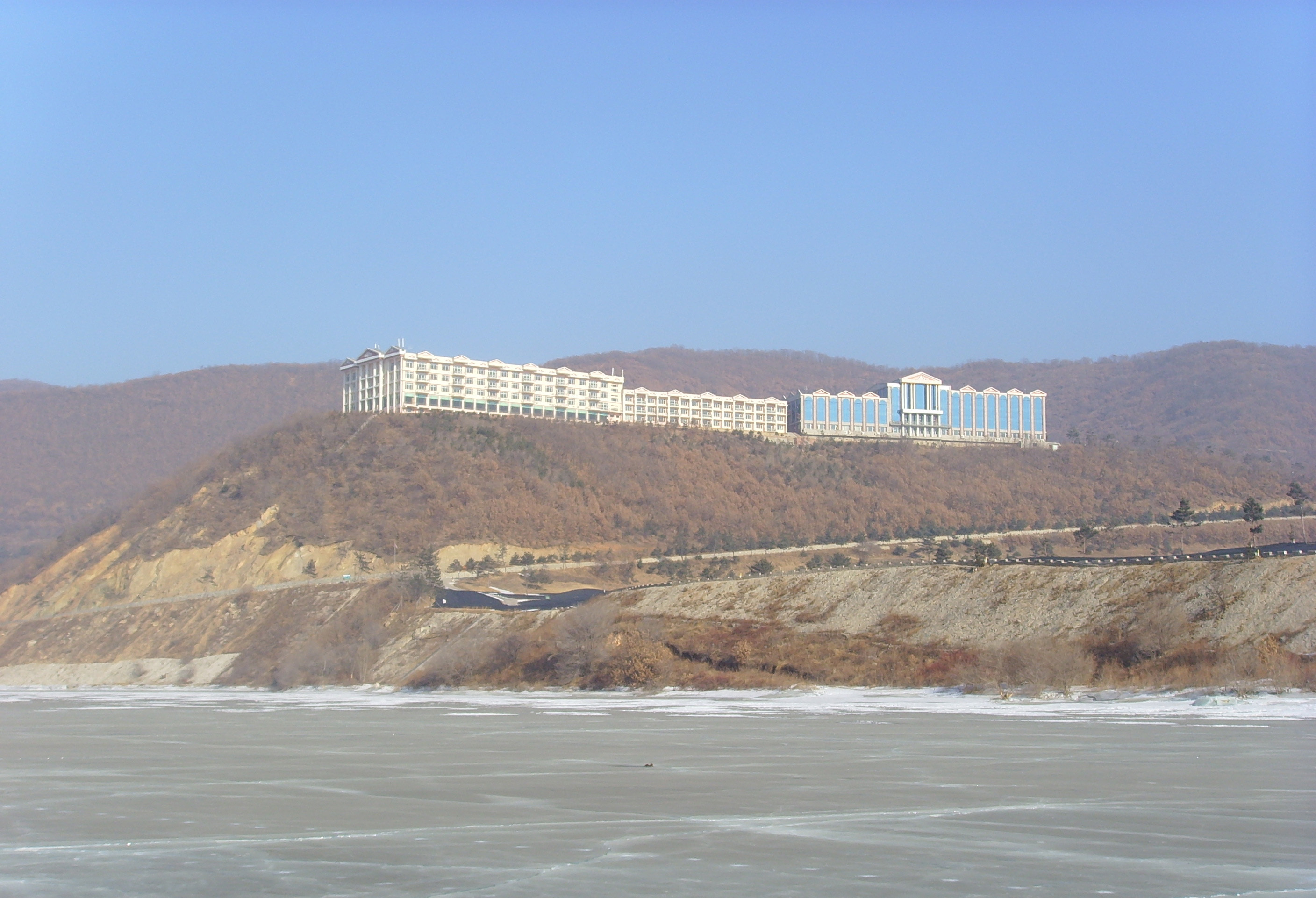
Hailanhu Scenic in Yanji.

The Hailan River (Chinese: 海兰江; pinyin: Hǎilán Jiāng, Korean: 해란강, Manchu: ᡥᠠᡳᠯᠠᠨ
ᠪᡳᡵᠠ, romanized: hailan bira) is a tributary of the Buerhatong River in east Jilin province of China. The source of river is located in Helong and flows generally from southwest to northeast across Longjing City and joins Buerhatong River at east of Yanji City.The river has a length of 145 km and drains an area of 2,934 square km.
