= Sandaowan =

Town in Jilin, China

Sandaowan 三道湾镇
- Town
- Location in Jilin
- Coordinates: 43°9′41″N 129°10′11″E
- Country: People's Republic of China
- Province: Jilin
- Autonomous prefecture: Yanbian
- County-level city: Yanji
- Time zone: UTC+8 (China Standard)

Sandaowan is a town in Yanji, Yanbian, Jilin, China. It has a total population of 9944 and a total area of 555.7 sq km. It is divided into Canchang Community, Meikuang Community, Zhongxin Village, Wudao Village, Nanzhangzhi Village, Beizhangzhi Village, Donggou Village, Pinggang Village, Tuntian Village, Zhibian Village and Lishu Village.
