= Henan Subdistrict, Yanji =

Henan Subdistrict 河南街道
- Subdistrict
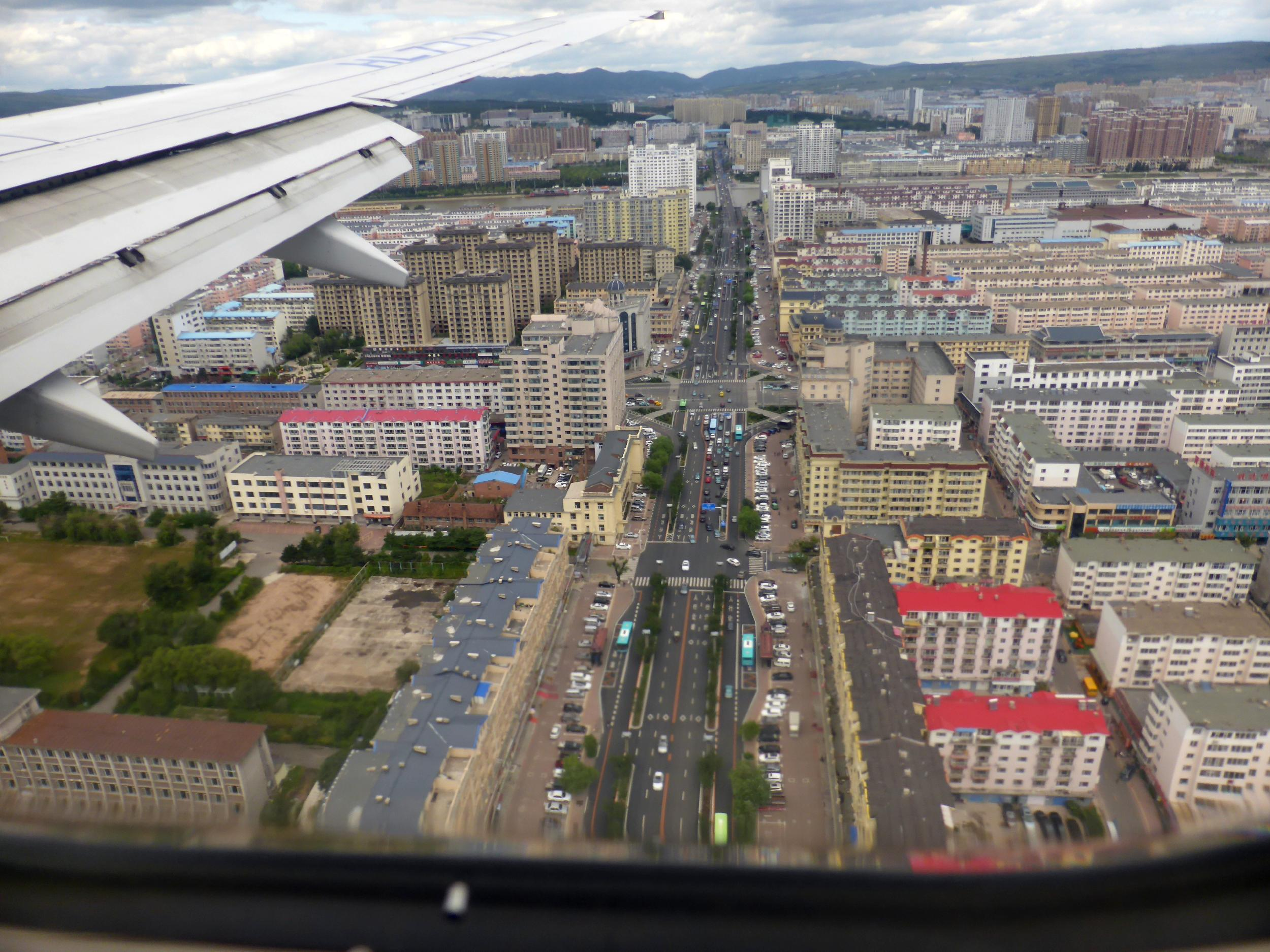
- Henan subdistrict as seen from above.

- Location in Jilin
- Coordinates (Henan Subdistrict office): 42°53′43″N 129°28′58″E
- Country: People's Republic of China
- Province: Jilin
- Autonomous prefecture: Yanbian
- County-level city: Yanji
- Time zone: UTC+8 (China Standard)

Henan Subdistrict (Chinese: 河南街道; pinyin: Hénán Jiēdào) is a subdistrict in Yanji, Jilin province, China. As of 2018, it has 12 communities under its administration.

== See also ==
- List of township-level divisions of Jilin
