= Bu'erhatong River =

River in Jilin, China

Coordinates: 43°00′16″N 129°47′04″E

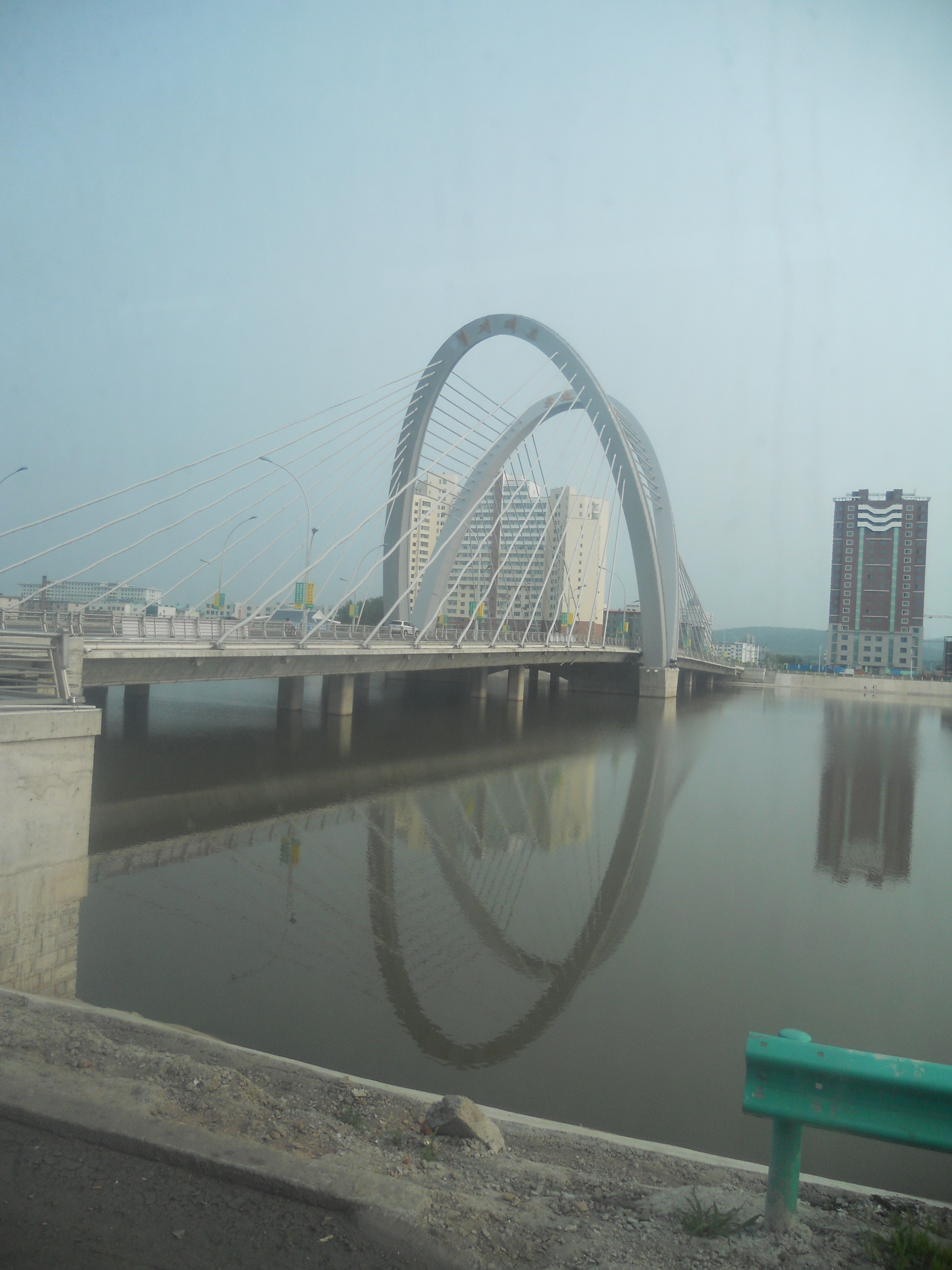
Bu'erhatong River in Yanji.

The Bu'erhatong River (Chinese: 布尔哈通河; pinyin: Bù'ěrhātōng Hé, Manchu: ᠪᡠᡵᡥᠠᡨᡠ
ᠪᡳᡵᠠ, romanized: burhatu bira) is a tributary of the Gaya River in east Jilin province of China. The source of river is located in Antu County and flows generally from west to east across Yanji City and joins Gaya River at west of Tumen City.The river has a length of 172 km and drains an area of 7,065 square km.
