= Gando Massacre =

1920–1921 massacre of Koreans by Japan

Gando massacre
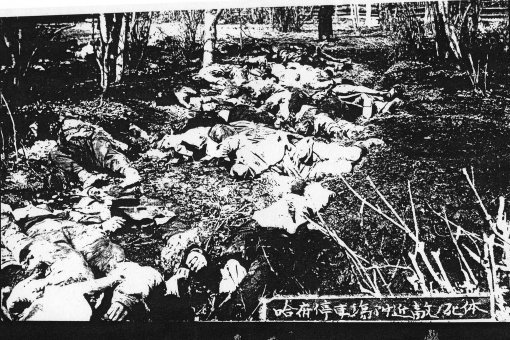
- Bodies of Korean civilians near Khabarovsk station (photo album of the 75th Infantry Regiment, 19th Division of Imperial Japanese Army)
- Location: Eastern Manchuria
- Date: October 1920 – April 1921
- Target: Koreans in China; National Army troops
- Attack type: Massacre
- Weapons: Gun, Japanese sword and bamboo spear
- Deaths: at least 5,000 civilians
- Injuries: unknown
- Perpetrator: Imperial Japanese Army

Gando massacre

Kantō incident
- Kanji: 間島事件
- Hiragana: かんとうじけん
Transcriptions
- Revised Hepburn: Kantō jiken

Gando massacre on Gyeongsin
- Hangul: 경신간도학살사건
- Hanja: 庚申間島虐殺事件
Transcriptions
- Revised Romanization: Gyeongsin Gando haksal sageon
- McCune–Reischauer: Kyŏngsin Kando haksal sakŏn

Gando massacre
- Hangul: 간도참변
- Hanja: 間島慘變
Transcriptions
- Revised Romanization: Gando chambyeon
- McCune–Reischauer: Kando ch'ambyŏn

Gyeongsin massacre
- Hangul: 경신참변
- Hanja: 庚申慘變
Transcriptions
- Revised Romanization: Gyeongsin chambyeon
- McCune–Reischauer: Kyŏngsin ch'ambyŏn

The Gando massacre was a mass murder committed by the Japanese military against the Korean residents of Gando (present-day Jiandao, Yanbian Korean Autonomous Prefecture, Jilin, China), after the Hunchun incident.

The massacre occurred over a period of three weeks starting in October 1920, the day of the Hunchun Incident after the Battle of Qingshanli. During this period, soldiers of the Imperial Japanese Army murdered Korean civilians who numbered an estimated at least 5,000, and perpetrated widespread rape.

== Background ==
In June 1920, Japan, which suffered a crushing defeat in the Battle of Fengwudong, launched the so-called 'Gando Region Bulyeong Seonin Scorched Land Plan (間島地方不逞鮮人剿討計劃)' for a large-scale 'subjugation' of the independence army and invaded Gando with the size estimated to be around 18,000. However, these units were attacked by the Korean Northern Army Command.

In October 1920, Japan launched the Hunchun incident to create a pretext for the Japanese army's invasion of Manchuria. And under the pretext of this, the Japanese army invaded Gando and carried out a scorched earth operation in order to eliminate the Korean Independence Army. However, at almost the same time as the Japanese army's Invasion of Manchuria, the Korean Independence Army had already moved its troops deep into the mountains or into the Sino-Soviet border area, out of the Japanese army's pursuit, causing a setback in the Japanese army's operations from the beginning. Moreover, the Japanese army, which had suffered a crushing defeat by the Korean Independence Army at the Battle of Cheongsanri, abandoned the subjugation plan and carried out an indiscriminate massacre of Koreans in retaliation over the course of three to four months.

== Massacre ==
Page 36 and 37 of memoir of Muntek Gim of Korean Liberation Army, describes Gando massacre.

Korean Provisional Government Foreign Office announced 3,469 people death, 3,209 burnt houses and other casualties at Gando from October 9th to November 30th, 1920. (page 2 of No.87 Tongnip sinmun on December 18th, 1920)

Chicago Daily News on December 16th, 1920 reports Gando massacre of Imperial Japan.

Letter of William R. Foote pastor at Longjing on October 30th, 1920 describes massacre at Jangam-dong (장암동).

Two civilians facing death at the hands of Imperial Japanese army during Gando massacre of 1920 (from photo album of the 75th Infantry Regiment, 19th Division of Imperial Japanese Army)

Bodies of Korean civilians massacred by Imperial Japanese army during Gando massacre in 1920 (from photo album of the 75th Infantry Regiment, 19th Division of Imperial Japanese Army)

Dead body at Gando massacre (from photo album of the 75th Infantry Regiment, 19th Division of Imperial Japanese Army)

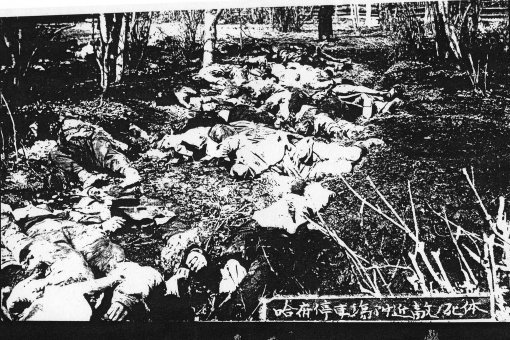
Bodies of Korean civilians near Khabarovsk station (from photo album of the 75th Infantry Regiment, 19th Division of Imperial Japanese Army)

Joint funeral for victims of Gando massacre

Memorial monument for the victims of the Jangam-dong massacre (part of Gando massacre), erected at the site of the massacre at Gando

The Japanese army surrounded and attacked the Korean village, gathered all the men in one place and massacred them with guns or spears, and raped and killed the women on sight. In addition, they burned all the houses and looted the livestock, turning the village into ruins.

The 19th Division of the Japanese Army invaded the North Gando region and burned down the barracks and the officers' training center building of the North Gando Association, and at the end of October 1920, they caused the Jangam-dong disaster. The 77 troops of the 3rd Battalion of the 15th Regiment of the 14th Division of the Japanese Army from the Maritime Province, entered Jangam-dong, located 25 ri north of Yongjeongchon, and gathered all the residents, the majority of whom were Christians, at a church and held a concentration camp. They set up 28 Christians and used them as targets for rifle shooting practice, and in Uiran-gu, Yanji County, they massacred all the residents of about 30 households and killed four brothers. They made the above 33 men kneel on the ground, filled the church with straw bales, sprinkled petroleum on them, and set it on fire. The church was immediately engulfed in flames, and the Japanese soldiers committed atrocities by stabbing and eventually exterminating all those who jumped out of the fire.

After the Japanese army returned, the distraught families retrieved the charred bodies, barely dressed it, and held a funeral. However, five or six days later, the Japanese army attacked the village again and ordered graves to be dug and the bodies gathered in one place. In order to survive, the family dug up the frozen ground again and gathered all the corpses. This time, the Japanese soldiers got straw bales on the corpses, sprinkled oil on them, and set them on fire, burning them until they turned into charcoal and ashes. The bodies of these double massacres were unknown, so the families were unable to do so, so they buried them together and made a tomb.

Also, on 19 October 1920, Japanese troops arrested Lee Yong-jeom, the chief of Bukjangpae Village in Hwaryong-hyeon, and farmers Jang Doo-hwan, Shin Guk-hyeon, and Kim Jong-min, and killed them in Pungdoryeong. They broke into Songeon-dun (宋堰屯), Hwaryong-hyeon, searched the house, massacred 14 people, including Ji Gye-sun, and then caused the 'Songeon-dong Massacre' by spraying oil and incinerating the bodies.

In addition, as part of retaliation for the defeat in the Battle of Baekunpyeong, the Japanese massacred all men living in the 23rd household of Baekunpyeong Village, including infants, and on 20 October. Myeongdong School was incinerated. Not only that, they captured a teacher living in Waryong-dong, Yanji County, skinned his face, and gouged out his eyes, making it impossible to identify him. In addition, they committed heinous atrocities, including stabbing a young child to death with a knife and burning the body, and assaulting and killing a young girl.

These cruel atrocities of the Japanese army were vividly exposed by foreign missionaries who were doing missionary work in Manchuria. An American missionary who witnessed the Japanese army's massacre lamented, "The blood-soaked land of Manchuria is a cursed page of human history," and this is vividly proven in the memoirs of missionaries Martin (SH) and Foote.

In addition, the assassination of Dong-A Ilbo reporter Jang Deok-jun (張德俊) by the Japanese military, who had gone to the site to cover such atrocities by the Japanese military at the time, was also one of the means to cover up the atrocities of the Japanese military. It was also reported in domestic and international media by Dr. S. Martin (Minsanhae), a British missionary who ran the company.

== Aftermath ==
The number of Koreans massacred in the Gando area over a 27-day period from 9 October – 5 November 1920, was 3,469. The number of Koreans who were sacrificed by the Japanese army's massacre that lasted for 3 to 4 months, would have been many more.

As public opinion toward the Japanese military worsened both at home and abroad due to the Gyeongshin Disaster, the Japanese decided to withdraw the main force from Gando on 20 December. However, even in this situation, the Japanese military called some troops of the 19th Division the 'Gando Detachment' on 16 December. The Jiando detachment, which was left in the field and was organized on 31 December, focused on searching for independence movement forces and handling the problem of defectors in Yongjeongchon, Gukjaga, Baekcho-gu, Dudo-gu, and Uiran-gu. In addition, in February 1921, the Japanese organized a Gando liaison group to connect Yongjeongchon, Dudogu, Baekchogu, Cheonbosan Mountain. They stationed themselves in other places and carried out intelligence activities, and even after the remaining units completely withdrew in May 1921, they worked to strengthen their influence in Gando by renaming the liaison group as 'liaison office' and continuing its activities.

== In popular culture ==
- Song of the Bandits (2023 TV series)

== See also ==
- Battle of Qingshanli
- Big suppression operation against South Korea
- Hailan River massacre
- Hainan mass grave
- Imperial Japanese massacre against Donghak Peasant Movement
- Imperial Japanese massacre against March First Movement
- Japanese war crimes
- Jinan incident
- Kantō Massacre
- Nanjing Massacre
- Shinhanchon masssacre
