= Hainan mass grave =

Massacre committed by Imperial Japan

The Hainan mass grave refers to the incident during Korea under Japanese rule in which approximately 1,000 out of about 2,000 Koreans forcibly mobilized by Imperial Japan to Hainan Island in China died at the hands of the Imperial Japanese through endemic diseases such as malaria, malnutrition, and burning.

== Background ==
Hainan Island is located south of the Leizhou Peninsula in Guangdong Province, China. With an area of 33,210 square kilometers, it is the largest island in China. It borders the South China Sea to the east and south, and the Gulf of Tonkin to the west. Historically, it has been inhabited by ethnic minorities such as the Li, Miao, and Zhuang peoples.

Imperial Japan's ambitions regarding Hainan Island had been accumulating since before 1939, when it launched a military invasion. Starting in the early 20th century, Imperial Japan conducted various surveys in conjunction with the Government-General of Taiwan, with a particular focus on mineral resources. Hainan, which has a subtropical climate, is rich in various resources including mines, marine resources, and forests. Furthermore, situated at a point connecting China's Guangdong Province, Indochina, Taiwan, and the South Seas Mandate, it holds significant geopolitical importance. In 1939, Imperial Japan invaded Hainan Island with the aim of managing it as a military base encompassing the South China region (including Guangdong Province, southern China), Southeast Asia, and the Pacific Ocean, while simultaneously serving as a raw material supply base to secure iron ore and timber essential for the production of military supplies.

Imperial Japan launched the Second Sino-Japanese War following the Lugou Bridge incident on July 7, 1937, and after invading Hainan Island on February 10, 1939, it colonized the island for six years and six months until its defeat. During this period of colonial rule, Imperial Japan established a series of wartime economic development policies to procure war materials and mobilized agricultural, industrial, and commercial enterprises from Imperial Japan and Taiwan under the protection of the Imperial Japanese Navy to engage in various development projects. Under these circumstances, as the local population of Hainan alone could not meet the labor requirements, Koreans and Chinese were forcibly mobilized to Hainan. They were mobilized to work in areas under the jurisdiction of companies or to construct military facilities commanded by the Navy.

== Reality of forced mobilization of Koreans ==
The Koreans sent to Hainan were prisoners. Imperial Japan began sending prisoners to the South Seas Mandate starting in 1939. Prisoners from Imperial Japanese prisons were dispatched to islands such as Tinian and Chuuk Lagoon under the pretexts of the Southern Red Serenity Corps (南方赤誠隊) and the Tunan Patriotic Corps (圖南報國隊). Since the Russo-Japanese War, Imperial Japanese prisons had served the mission of supplying military materials. This was because the work performed within the prisons by prisoners offered the advantages of simultaneously satisfying both cheap labor and security. In addition to prison labor, prisoners were also mobilized for external work at factories. Particularly after 1943, during the so-called "decisive battle system," prisoners became the most easily mobilized group, and the forced mobilization of Korean prisoners to Hainan took place against this backdrop.

According to the ‘Matter Concerning the Increase in Supervisory Personnel, etc. Following the Deployment of Prisoners from the Government-General of Korea to Hainan Island’ sent by Minister of Home Affairs Michio Yuzawa to Prime Minister Hideki Tojo on April 12, 1943, over 2,000 people were conscripted from prisons throughout Korea, including Seodaemun Prison, and sent to Hainan Island in eight separate batches from March 30, 1943, to 1944. According to the *Punishment System of Korea (朝鮮の行刑制度)* (治刑協會, 1938), compiled by the Penal Administration Division of the Legal Affairs Bureau of the Government-General of Korea, the total number of inmates in Korea in 1943 was 23,532, with approximately 8.5% of the total inmates being sent to Hainan Island.

The Korean inmates stationed on Hainan Island were later stationed in Joseon Village (조선촌, 朝鮮村) and Namjeong Village (남정촌, 南丁村). Additionally, about 1,500 people were assigned to the construction of naval facilities in Sanya (三亞) and Lingshui (陵水), and about 500 people were assigned to the iron ore mining work in Seokrok (석록, 石碌), which was developed by Japan Nitrogen Fertilizer Co., Ltd. It is estimated that about 1,000 of them perished on-site. Meanwhile, it is also known that the aforementioned about 1,000 people were subjected to a "massacre" by Imperial Japan, and their bodies were buried in the "mass grave (천인갱, 千人坑)" However, it appears they died from endemic diseases such as malaria and malnutrition, and the claim of a "massacre" is based on secondary sources or testimonies derived from rumors. Nevertheless, it is evident that Imperial Japan drove approximately 1,000 Koreans to their deaths, whether by neglecting laborers to death when they contracted endemic diseases or by burning them to death to prevent the spread of infectious diseases.

== See also ==
- Gando Massacre
- Hailan River massacre
- Japanese war crimes
- Kantō Massacre
- Massacre against March First Movement
- Nanjing Massacre
