= Yanji =

Yanji 延吉市 · 연길시
- County-level city
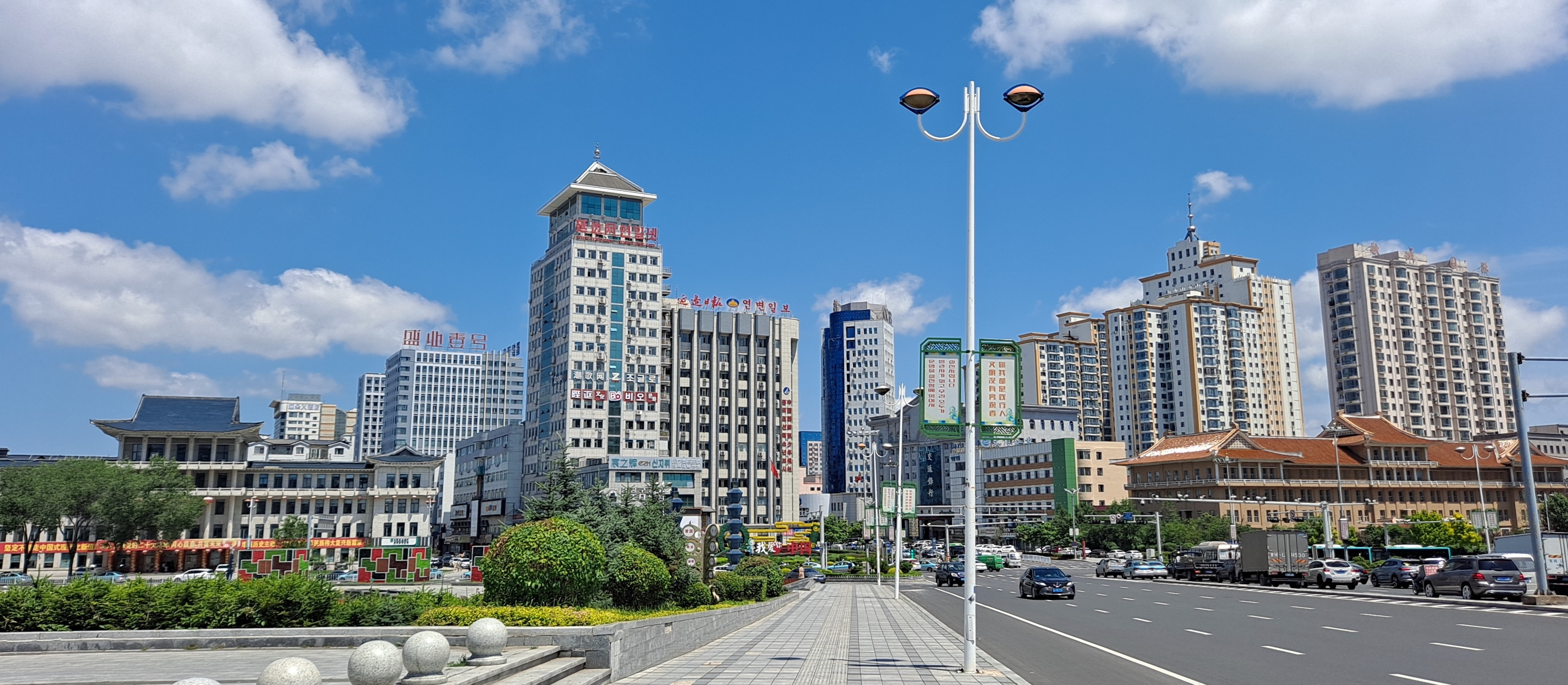
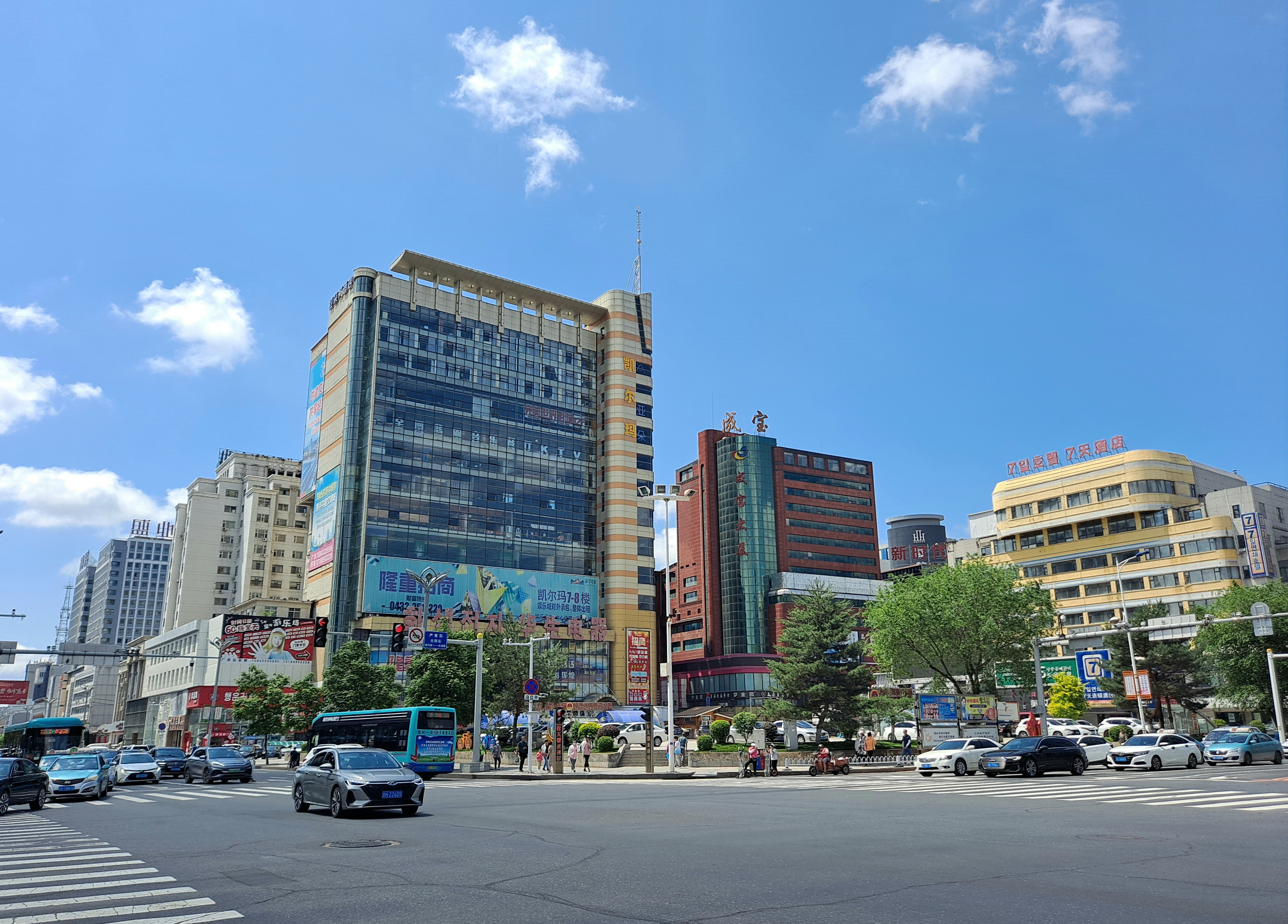
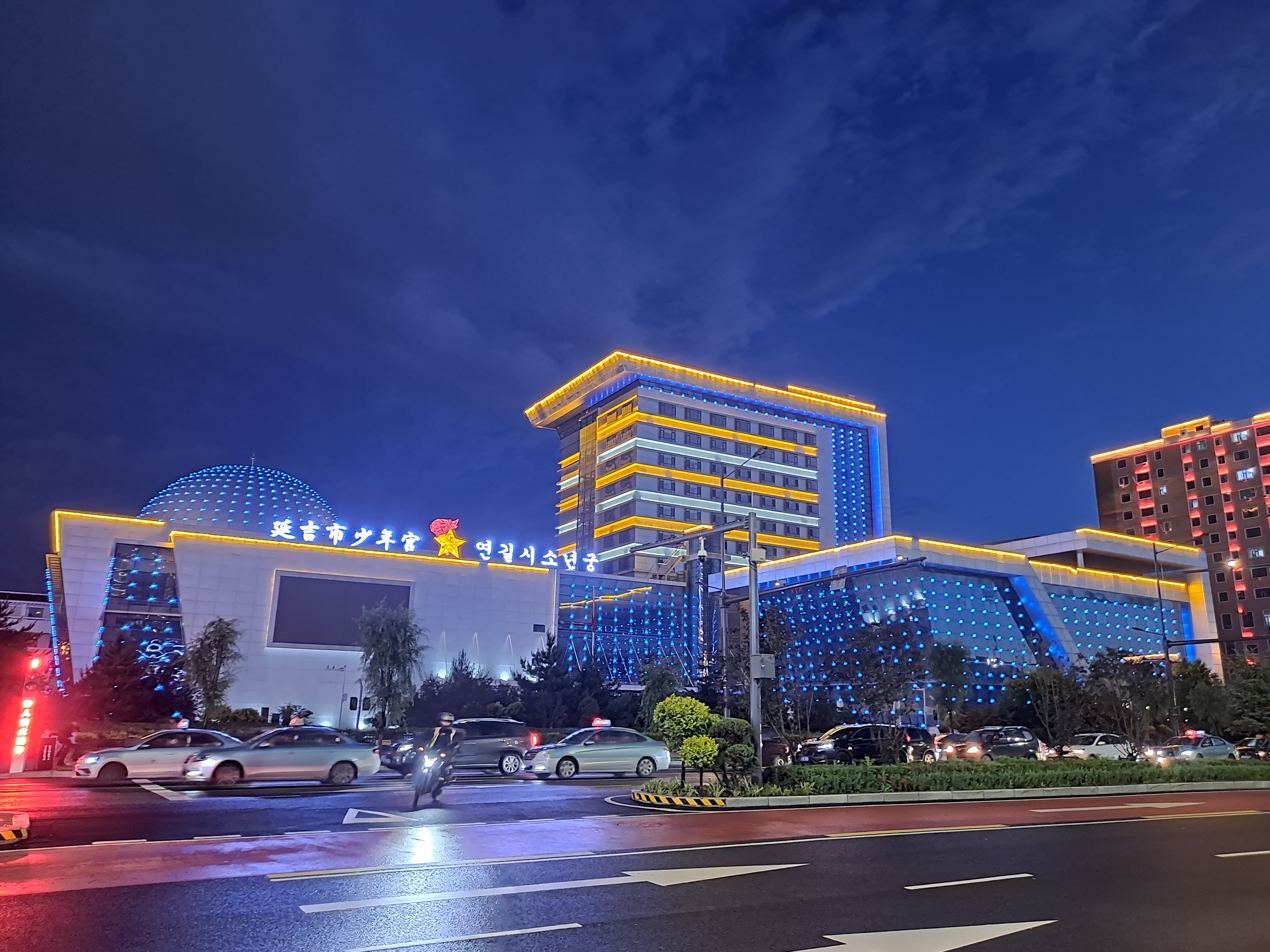
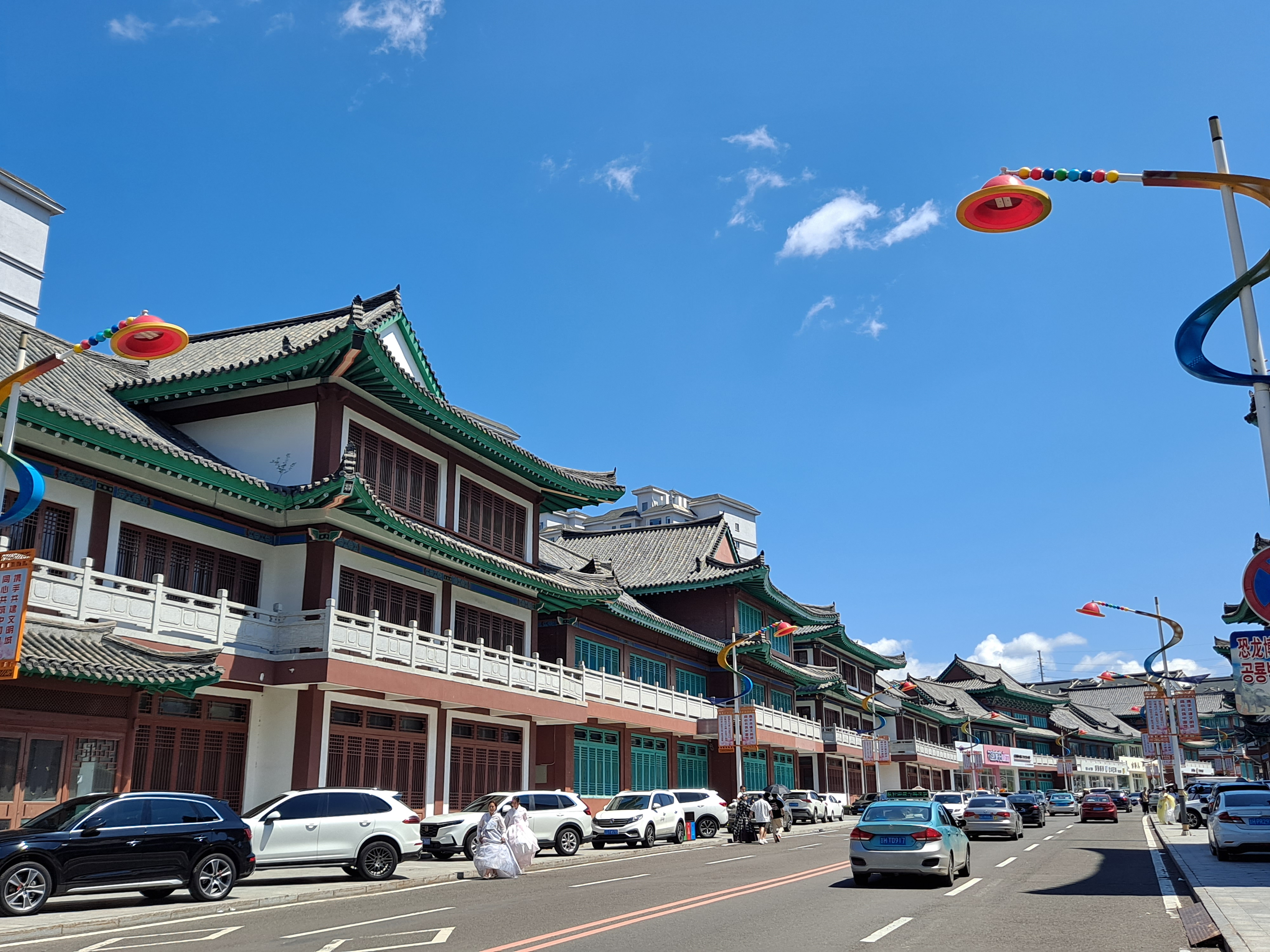
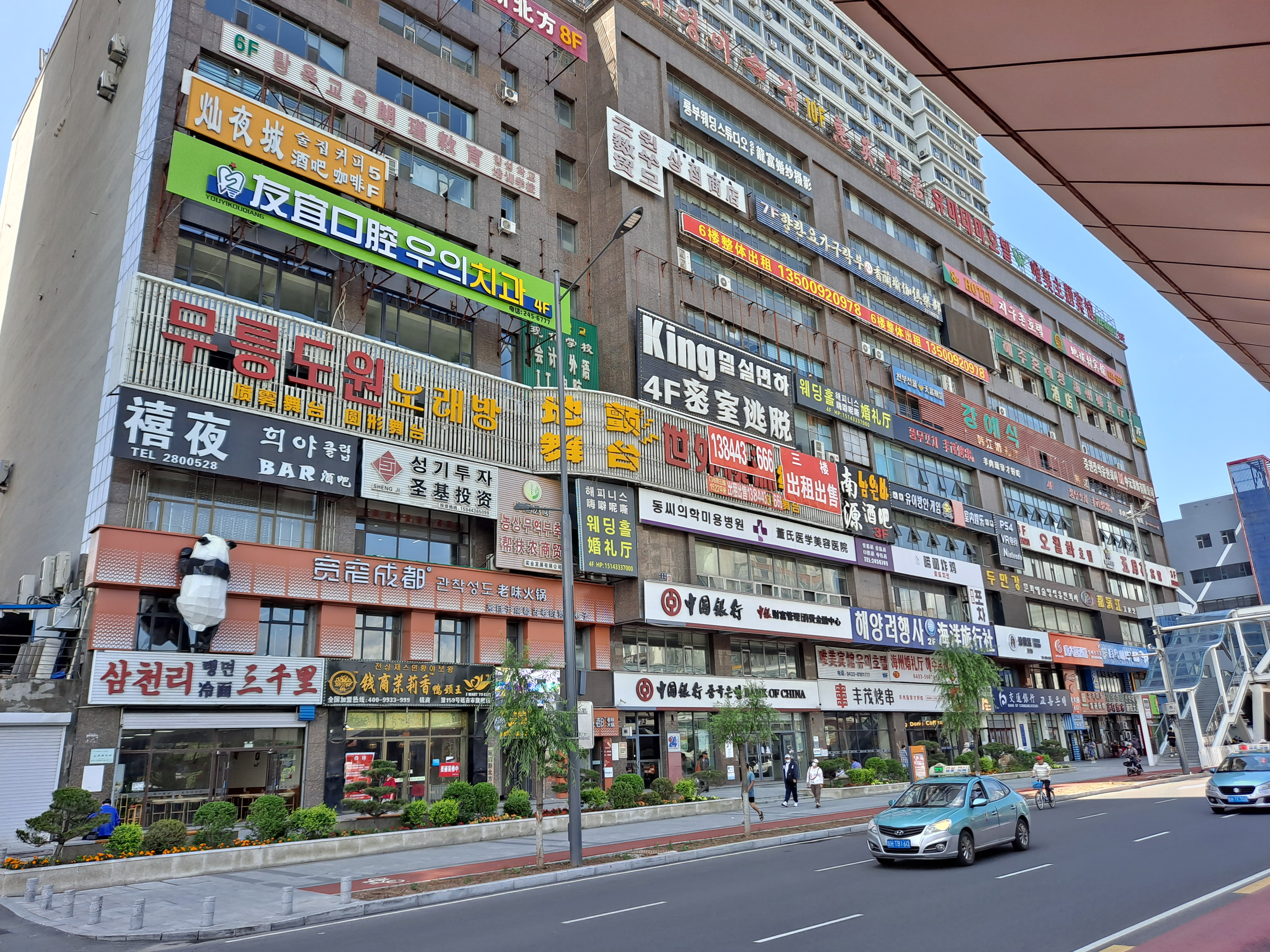
- Cityscape of Yanji Downtown Yanji Children's Palace Chinese Korean Folk Park Shopping mall adjacent to Park Bridge Station

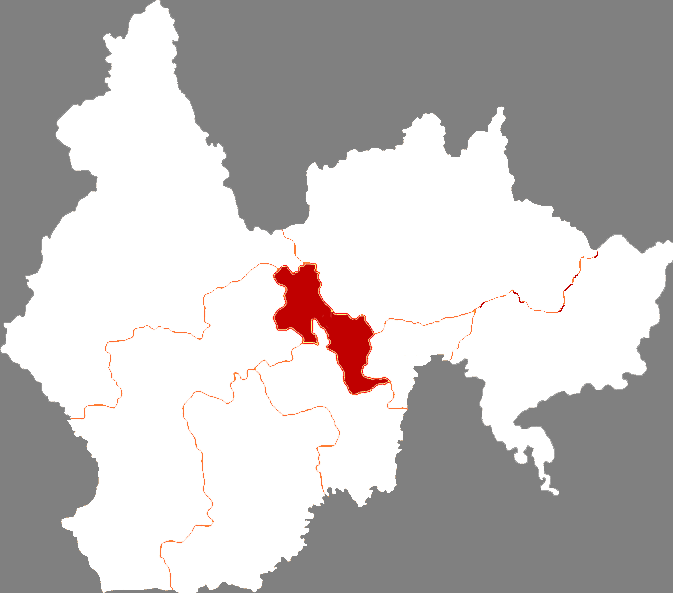
- Yanji in Yanbian

- Location of Yanji in Jilin Province
- Coordinates: 42°54′N 129°30′E
- Country: China
- Province: Jilin
- Autonomous prefecture: Yanbian
- Township-level divisions: 6 subdistricts 3 towns
- Municipal seat: Henan Subdistrict

Area
  - County-level city: 1,748.3 km^{2} (675.0 sq mi)
  - Urban: 40.66 km^{2} (15.70 sq mi)
- Elevation: 179 m (587 ft)

Population (2020 census)
  - County-level city: 686,136
  - Density: 392.46/km^{2} (1,016.5/sq mi)
  - Urban: 548,700
  - Urban density: 13,490/km^{2} (34,950/sq mi)
- Time zone: UTC+8 (China Standard)
- Website: www.yanji.gov.cn

Yanji
- Chinese: 延吉
Transcriptions
Standard Mandarin
- Hanyu Pinyin: Yánjí
- Wade–Giles: Yen-chi

Chinese Korean name
- Chosŏn'gŭl: 연길
- Hancha: 延吉
Transcriptions
- Revised Romanization: Yeongil
- McCune–Reischauer: Yŏn'gil

South Korean name
- Hangul: 옌지
Transcriptions
- Revised Romanization: Yenji
- McCune–Reischauer: Yenji

Yanji (Chinese: 延吉; Korean: 연길 Yŏn'gil; alternately romanized as Yenki or Yenji) is a county-level city in the east of China's Jilin Province, and is the seat of the Yanbian Korean Autonomous Prefecture. Yanji City is located in the eastern part of Jilin Province. It is the seat of the government of Yanbian Korean Autonomous Prefecture and the political, economic and cultural center of the entire autonomous prefecture. Its population is approximately 400,000 of which a significant portion is ethnic Korean. Yanji is a busy hub of transport and trade between China and North Korea. The city is home to Yanbian University, a comprehensive university and the only Project 211 university in Yanji.

== History ==
Yanji and its environs were largely unpopulated until the 1800s when Qing dynasty rulers of China began to encourage migration there from China proper as part of its Chuang Guandong policy to populate Manchuria in an effort to stem encroaching Russian expansion.

The city was the seat of Jiandao Province in the Japanese puppet state of Manchukuo from 1934 to 1943. In 1943, the city itself was renamed Jiandao (Chientao) and made a part of the Dongman Consolidated Province (东满总省).

Following World War II, the city (again called Yanji) was nominally part of a new Songjiang Province but with the communist seizure of power in 1949, Sonjiang's borders were changed and Yanji became part of Jilin Province.

Yanji is now part of the Yanbian Korean Autonomous Prefecture, which is situated in eastern Jilin. Yanji City is centrally located, surrounded by five other county-level cities and two rural counties (see map); it is the administrative seat of the prefecture.

== International incidents ==
The North Korean military detonated its second nuclear test in May 2009 close to the Chinese border, and the blast set off an earthquake of magnitude 4.5 with an epicenter only 112 mi (180 km) from Yanji. The mutual goodwill of the Chinese and Korean populations in the region was put under severe strain, and many in Yanji expressed newfound feelings of dismay and insecurity regarding their North Korean neighbors.

A South Korean pastor, the Reverend Kim Dong-shik, was kidnapped in Yanji in January 2000, one of numerous well-publicized North Korean abductions of South Koreans; a suspect of mixed Korean-Chinese descent, said to have been trained in Pyongyang, was arrested and charged with the crime in December 2004.

Yanji was the starting point of an international dispute in 2009 when two American journalists, Euna Lee and Laura Ling, were detained by North Korean border guards when, after leaving Yanji, they overstepped the nearby demarcation line. The two were freed only after intervention at the highest level by former US President Clinton.

Crystal meth seeping across the border from North Korea has led to a drug problem. According to a Brookings report, "Jilin Province is not only the most important transshipment point for drugs from North Korea into China, but has itself become one of the largest markets in China for amphetamine-type stimulants." Yanji had registered nearly 2100 drug addicts in 2010 compared to just 44 in 1990; local officials admitted that the actual number was possibly five or six times higher.

== Geography and climate ==
The geographical coordinates are between 42°50' and 43°23' north latitude, and between 129°01' and 129°48' east longitude. Yanji is situated among foothills, with the main metropolitan area contained in a small, very flat area. It is ringed by mountains dotted with small, remote farming communities. It has a four-season, monsoon-influenced, humid continental climate (classified in the Köppen system as Dwb), with long, very cold winters, and short, but very warm, humid summers. Spring and autumn constitute very short transitions with some, but usually not heavy, rainfall. The monthly 24-hour average temperature ranges from −13.2 °C (8.2 °F) in January to 21.7 °C (71.1 °F) in August, while the annual mean is 5.69 °C (42.2 °F) and a total precipitation of 531 mm (20.9 in), most of it falling during the summer. Sunshine is generous but falling far short of the central and western parts of Jilin; with monthly percent possible sunshine ranging from 39% in July to 62% in February, there are 2,280 hours of bright sunshine annually.

Climate data for Yanji, elevation 257 m (843 ft), (1991–2020 normals, extremes 1951–present)
Month	Jan	Feb	Mar	Apr	May	Jun	Jul	Aug	Sep	Oct	Nov	Dec	Year
Record high °C (°F)	8.6 (47.5)	15.1 (59.2)	26.6 (79.9)	32.8 (91.0)	35.5 (95.9)	37.2 (99.0)	37.7 (99.9)	37.3 (99.1)	33.1 (91.6)	30.2 (86.4)	21.1 (70.0)	10.1 (50.2)	37.7 (99.9)
Mean daily maximum °C (°F)	−6.4 (20.5)	−1.5 (29.3)	5.8 (42.4)	15.0 (59.0)	21.1 (70.0)	24.5 (76.1)	27.1 (80.8)	27.0 (80.6)	22.5 (72.5)	14.8 (58.6)	3.6 (38.5)	−4.8 (23.4)	12.4 (54.3)
Daily mean °C (°F)	−12.6 (9.3)	−8.4 (16.9)	−0.8 (30.6)	7.7 (45.9)	14.0 (57.2)	18.4 (65.1)	21.8 (71.2)	21.6 (70.9)	15.5 (59.9)	7.4 (45.3)	−2.4 (27.7)	−10.5 (13.1)	6.0 (42.8)
Mean daily minimum °C (°F)	−17.6 (0.3)	−14.3 (6.3)	−6.8 (19.8)	1.0 (33.8)	7.7 (45.9)	13.4 (56.1)	17.6 (63.7)	17.4 (63.3)	10.0 (50.0)	1.4 (34.5)	−7.3 (18.9)	−15.1 (4.8)	0.6 (33.1)
Record low °C (°F)	−31.7 (−25.1)	−32.7 (−26.9)	−25.7 (−14.3)	−11.7 (10.9)	−5.2 (22.6)	3.9 (39.0)	9.1 (48.4)	6.5 (43.7)	−4 (25)	−13.6 (7.5)	−27.5 (−17.5)	−32.2 (−26.0)	−32.7 (−26.9)
Average precipitation mm (inches)	4.9 (0.19)	6.5 (0.26)	11.4 (0.45)	27.2 (1.07)	63.9 (2.52)	81.1 (3.19)	123.8 (4.87)	116.3 (4.58)	60.0 (2.36)	29.2 (1.15)	16.7 (0.66)	5.8 (0.23)	546.8 (21.53)
Average precipitation days (≥ 0.1 mm)	2.7	3.7	5.1	7.7	13.4	14.0	13.6	14.2	9.0	6.7	5.6	3.9	99.6
Average snowy days	5.4	5.6	7.1	2.8	0.1	0	0	0	0	1.3	5.8	6.5	34.6
Average relative humidity (%)	58	54	52	51	62	73	78	79	75	64	61	59	64
Mean monthly sunshine hours	174.3	186.8	219.3	211.4	222.1	199.8	186.2	193.1	210.7	203.1	154.8	153.2	2,314.8
Percentage possible sunshine	60	63	59	53	49	44	40	45	57	60	54	55	53
Source: China Meteorological Administration extremes

== Administrative divisions ==
Yanji has six subdistricts and four towns.

Name	Simplified Chinese	Hanyu Pinyin	Korean	McCune–Reischauer	Administrative division code
Subdistricts
Jinxue Subdistrict	进学街道	Jìnxué jiēdào	진학가도	chinhak kato	222401001
Beishan Subdistrict	北山街道	Běishān jiēdào	북산가도	puksan kato	222401002
Xinxing Subdistrict	新兴街道	Xīnxīng jiēdào	신흥가도	sinhŭng kato	222401003
Gongyuan Subdistrict	公园街道	Gōngyuán jiēdào	공원가도	kongwŏn kato	222401004
Henan Subdistrict	河南街道	Hénán jiēdào	하남가도	hanam kato	222401005
Jiangong Subdistrict	建工街道	Jiàngōng jiēdào	건공가도	kŏnkong kato	222401006
Towns
Xiaoying Town	小营镇	Xiǎoyíng zhèn	소영진	soyŏng chin	222401100
Yilan Town	依兰镇	Yīlán zhèn	의란진	wiran chin	222401101
Sandaowan Town	三道湾镇	Sāndàowān zhèn	삼도만진	samtoman chin	222401102
Chaoyangchuan Town	朝阳川镇	Cháoyángchuān zhèn	조양천진	choyangch'ŏn chin	222401105

== Demographics ==
The Korean diaspora in China has significant populations in at least eleven major Chinese cities, but none larger than Yanji: official Chinese census reports from 1990 placed the city's ethnic Korean population at over 170,000. In 1994, the estimated total population of Yanji was 343,600. Official census reports from 2000 have not yet been released publicly, but current estimates place it between about one third of the city's total population to more than one half. Both Chinese and Korean are considered "official languages" of the city: all official signs are in bilingual text.

== Economy ==
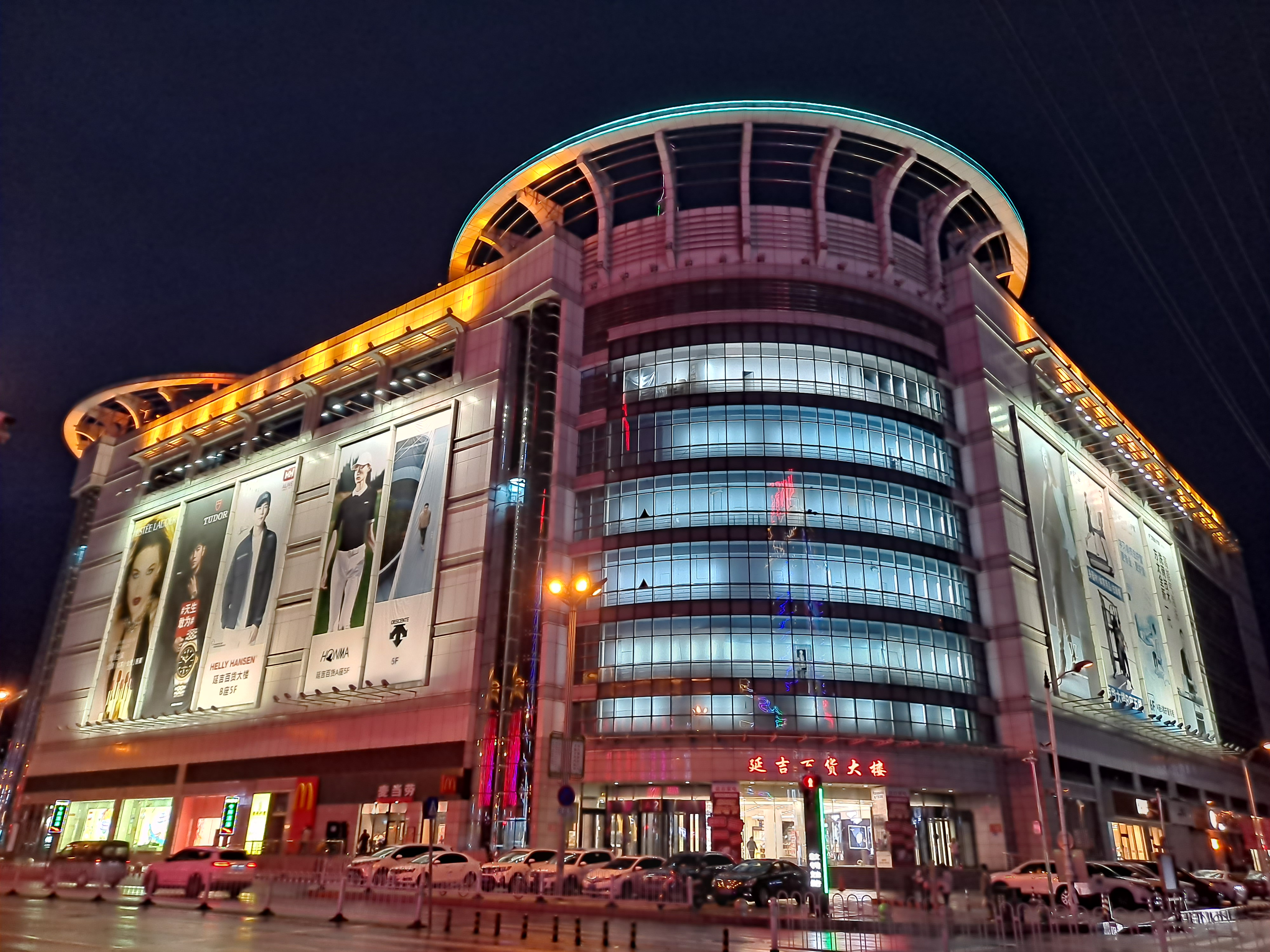
Yanji Department Store

With its current population estimated at four hundred thousand, Yanji is small by Chinese standards (by comparison, the population of Shanghai is almost twenty million). Yanji is also relatively young: the city was developed only in the nineteenth century and became the regional capital after the Second World War. Recent growth in tourism and overseas investment has helped to make Yanji a notably prosperous city. It abounds with modern architecture of steel and glass, and its broad avenues are conspicuously clean and well-maintained. In modern times, Yanji has become a city of transport and trade. China is the largest trading partner of North Korea, accounting for almost 40% of that country's international commerce, and Yanji is the center of much of the cross-border enterprise.

Beyond North Korea, other countries have begun to partner with Yanji business groups: currently there are over five hundred joint ventures with international partners ongoing in Yanji. Much of the recent investment has been made by South Korea and Taiwan, which has helped substantially in building the city's tourism industry.

Yanji also burnishes its reputation as a center of tourism by hosting the annual North China Travel Fair. Held every year since 1996, the fair is one of the largest of its kind in the country, showcasing over a thousand exhibitions representing cultural and economic partners from across China and overseas. Yanji also hosts the Tumen River Area International Investment & Business Forum, a three-day exposition held annually since 2000. As a key hub for cross-border trade with North Korea and Russia, Yanji hosts a national-level Cross-Border E-Commerce Comprehensive Pilot Zone. The zone leverages the city's bilingual (Chinese-Korean) workforce and logistical advantages to facilitate e-commerce for small and medium-sized enterprises in Northeast Asia.

== Transport and infrastructure ==
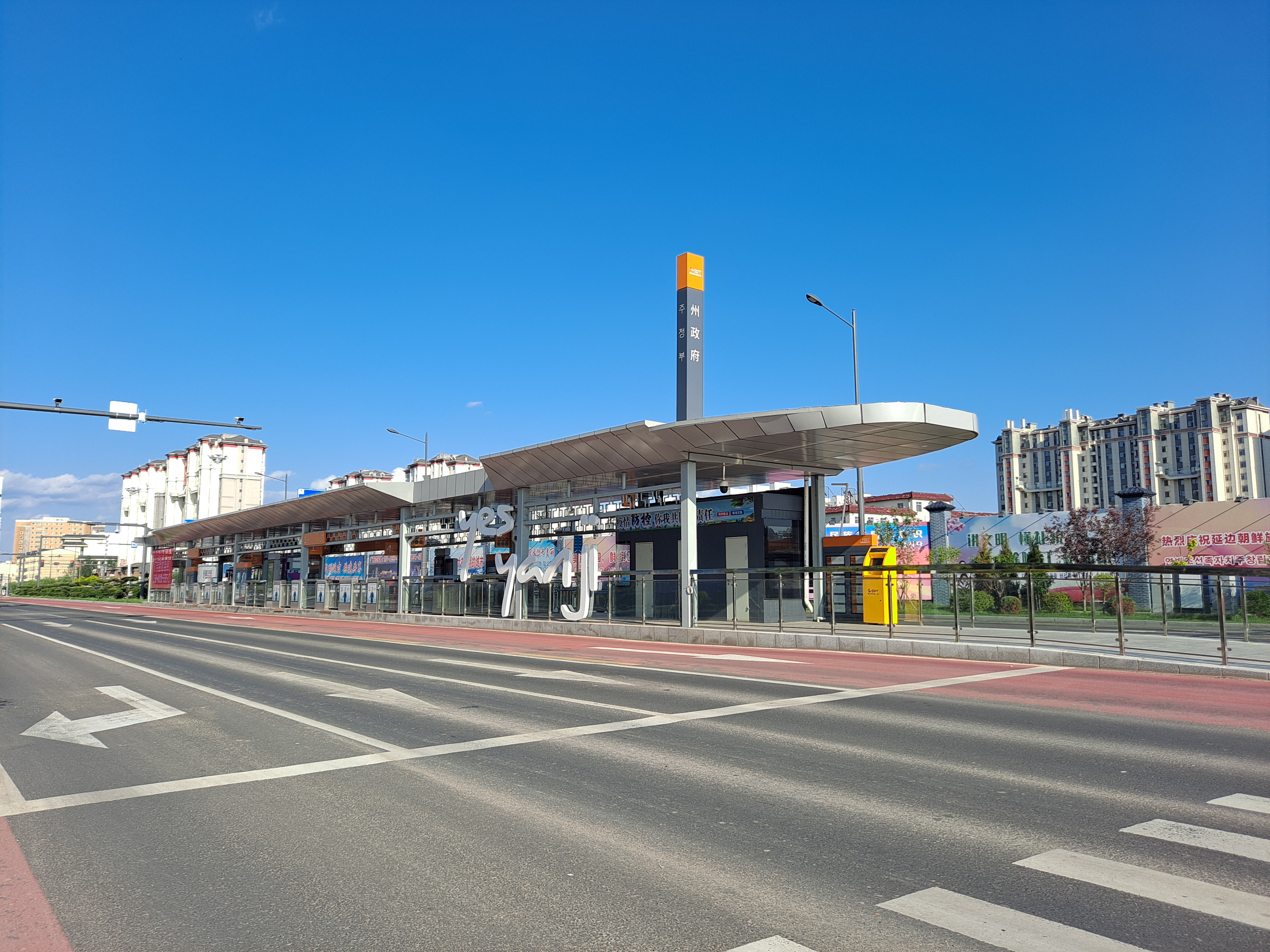
Yanji BRT station

Daily train service to most major urban centers of the province is available from Yanji, including a 24-hour trip to Beijing. A much shorter trip to the Chinese capital can be arranged at Yanji Chaoyangchuan International Airport which serves the area with scheduled passenger flights domestically and to Korea. International air service is provided by the Changchun Longjia Airport, and surface travel to Changchun itself has been made more accessible since the large Changchun-Yanji Expressway was opened to the public in 2009.

A new 125-mile (201 km) water and sewage pipeline was completed in 2006, linking Yanji and the neighboring cities of Jilin and Songyuan to modern sewage treatment plants along the Songhua River.

Yanji Station, located in Yanbian Autonomous Prefecture, Jilin Province, China, is a second-class station under the jurisdiction of China Railway Shenyang Bureau Group Co., Ltd. It was built in 1924. As of 2012, Yanji offers the most convenient road access to the Rason Special Economic Zone in North Korea.

== Education ==
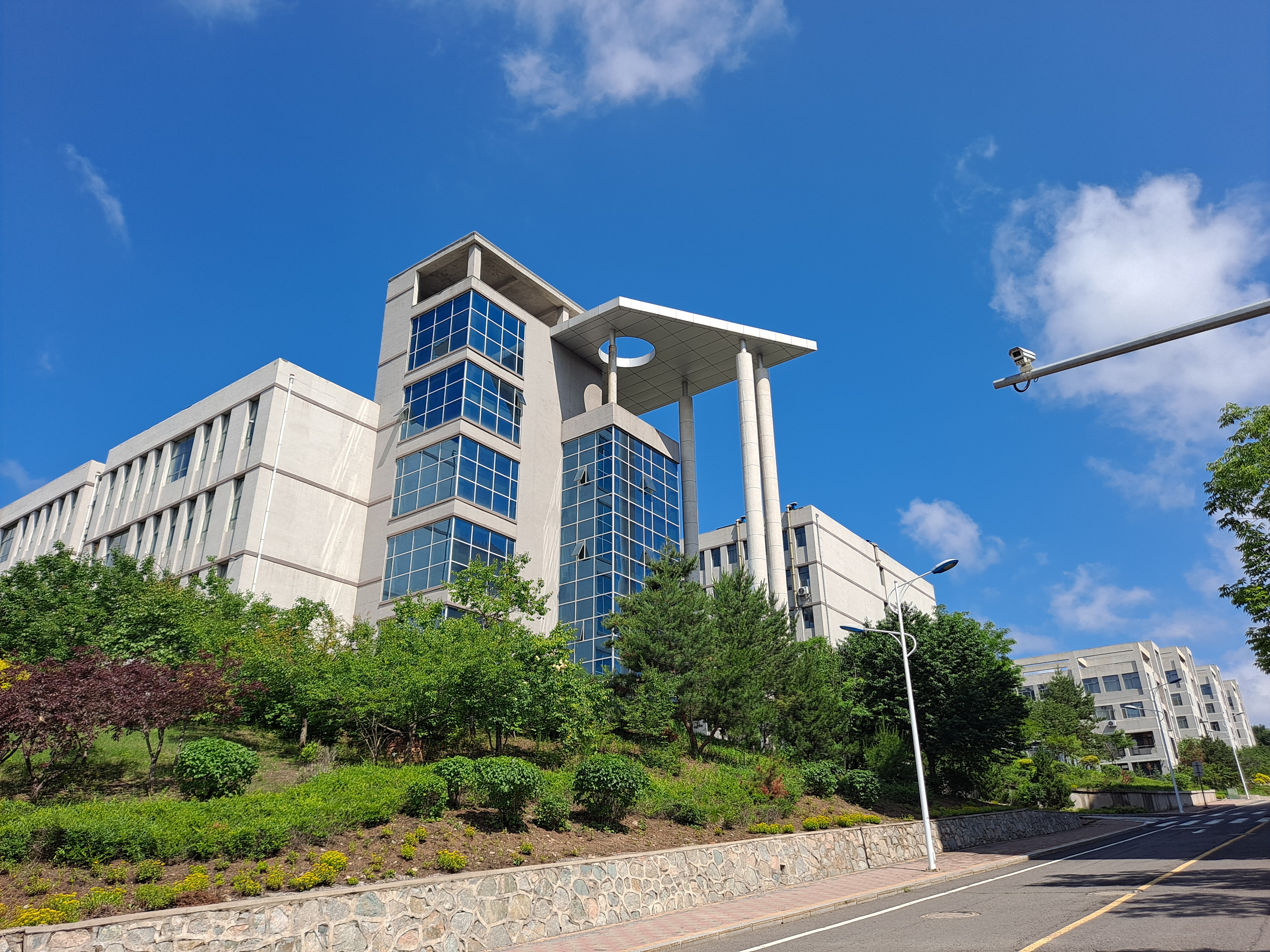
Yanbian University

Yanbian University is a comprehensive university in Yanji, founded in 1949; it offers eleven programs of study, including four doctoral programs. The university maintains a full-time teaching staff of over 1,400, serving an active student body of over sixteen thousand. One of Yanbian University's graduates, a Korean language major, is Zhang Dejiang, formerly a deputy secretary of the Municipal Committee of Yanji (1983–1985), and now a Vice-Premier of the Chinese Communist Party in Beijing. It is a national "double first-class" construction university, a national "211 Project" key construction university, a key construction university for western development, a key construction university jointly supported by the Jilin Provincial People's Government and the Ministry of Education, and a jointly supported construction university by the Jilin Provincial People's Government and the National Ethnic Affairs Commission.

Yanji is also home to the Yanbian University of Science and Technology, a technical research college founded in 1990, and the Yanbian Medical College.

Yanbian International Academy, the area school for foreigners, is located in Yanji. There is also a school for Koreans, Korean International School in Yanbian.

== Sport ==
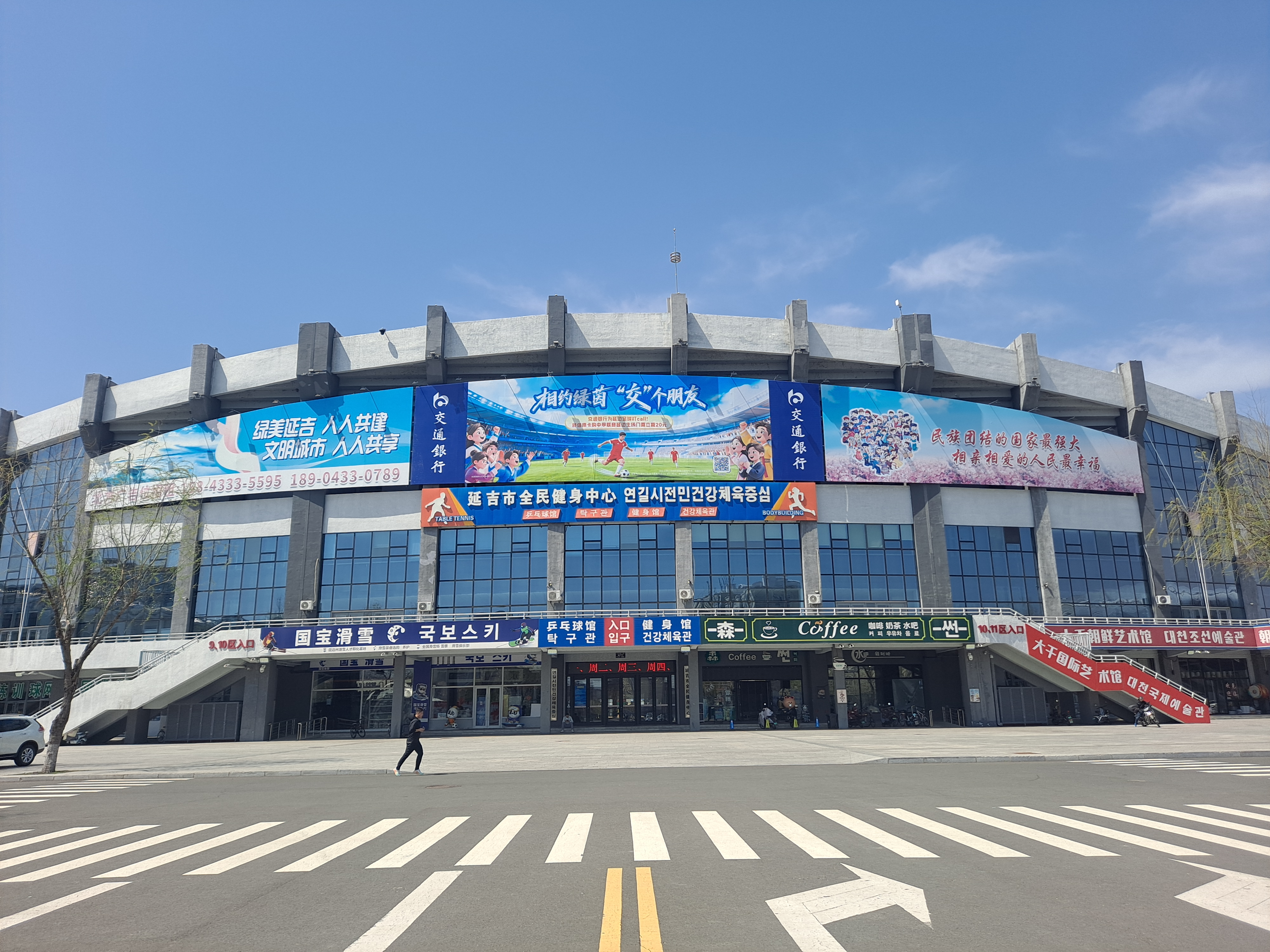
Yanji stadium entrance

Yanji hosts sporting events at the 50,000-seat People's Stadium. The city was the eighteenth stop for the Olympic torch relay at the opening of the 2008 Summer Games.

Officials from the Guinness Book of World Records visited the athletics stadium at Yanbian University in July 2010 to witness a new world record being set: over one thousand students simultaneously juggled soccer balls with their feet for more than ten seconds.

== Culture ==
Two all-Korean television channels are produced locally, and others can be freely received from both North and South Korea. Korean cuisine is highly popular and available everywhere. An annual Korean folk festival takes place each September in Yanji, featuring traditional Korean music, dance, painting, and sports.

Karaoke is popular in Yanji, and the city even has a burgeoning underground beatboxing scene, which has been documented by filmmaker Liu Feng in Yan Bian Box (2007).

== Travel ==
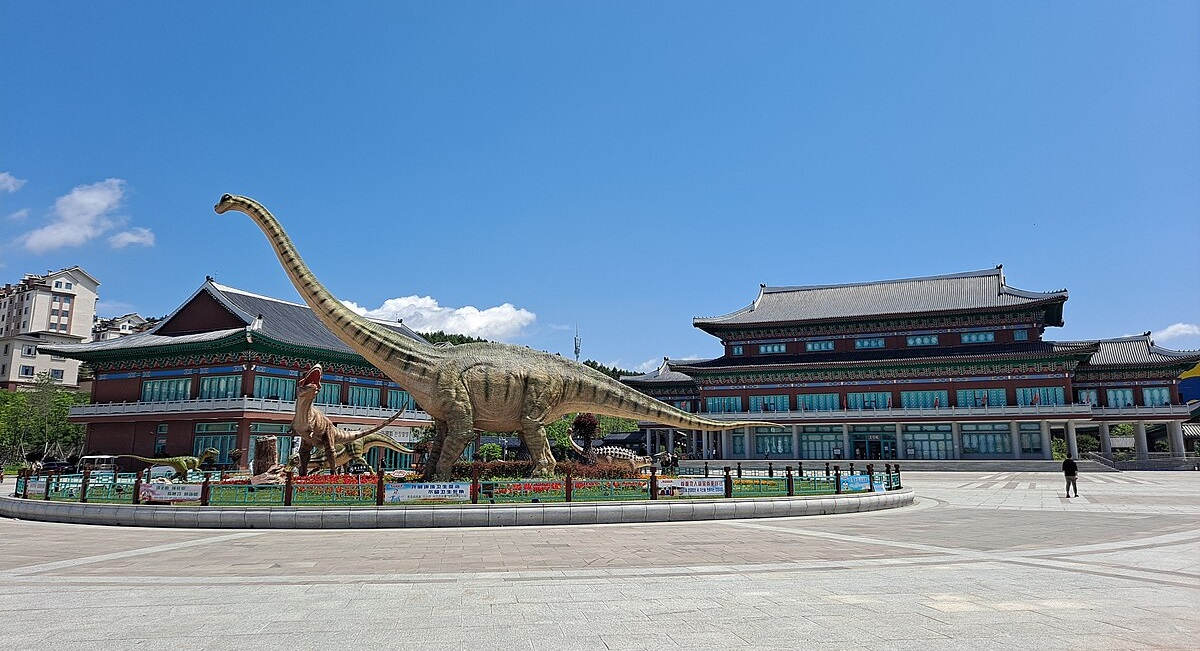
Yanji Dinosaur Museum

Yanji was named "China's Excellent Tourist City" by the National Tourism Administration. It has beautiful natural scenery, rich Korean culture, the majestic Changbai Mountain to the south, and the summer resort Jingbo Lake to the north. Attractions in Yanji include: Maoershan National Forest Park, Chengzishan Mountain City Ruins, Mengdumei Folk Tourism Resort, Chunxing Village, an ancient Korean village, etc.

Places such as China Korean Folk Garden, Yanbian University Internet Celebrity Wall, and Floating Market have become popular travel destinations. Tourists' experience activities in Yanji have also expanded from simply viewing the scenery, tasting food, and appreciating folk customs to visiting the local morning market and wearing traditional costumes.
