= Helong railway station =

Railway station in Helong, China

Coordinates: 42.5531°N 128.9891°E

Helong railway station, formerly Qingdao railway station and Sandaogou railway station, is a Chinese railway station in Helong, Yanbian, Jilin. It was founded in 1939.
