= Korean Chinese in Korea =

Return diaspora community

Korean Chinese in Korea (Chinese: 在韩朝鲜族; pinyin: Zàihán Cháoxiǎnzú), also called Jaehan Joseonjok (Korean: 재한조선족, romanized: Jaehan Joseonjok) are Chinese nationals of Korean ethnicity who live in Korea, primarily South Korea, with a visa or after having changed their nationality. They are a diasporic community whose ancestors migrated to China in the late 19th and early 20th centuries and have since relocated to Korea.

== South Korea ==
From the establishment of the Republic of Korea in 1948 until the early 1990s, there was limited governmental outreach or engagement with the Korean Chinese diaspora.

Then, after diplomatic relations were normalized between South Korea and the People's Republic of China in 1992, many ethnic Koreans living in China moved back to their ancestral homeland. Inspired by the newly revived and thriving South Korean economy, Korean Chinese from various backgrounds - labourers, farmers, housewives, teachers, and even public officials - left China, chasing the 'Korean Dream'. Around 200,000 Joseonjok resided in South Korea by 2011. This mass migration resulted in the disintegration of many villages and Korean-Chinese 'cultural islands' back in China. For example, more than half of the households in the village of Huanan in Helong city reportedly relocated to South Korea.

Many Joseonjok migrants initially tried to make a living by selling traditional Chinese medicines, but due to significant concerns over authenticity, they were shut down by the Korean Red Cross. Many Korean Chinese turned to other types of work. A 1995 report by the Institute of Labor Policy found that about 41% of Korean Chinese migrants were working in construction, while around 23% were employed in restaurants.

Korean Chinese were able to earn significantly more in South Korea than in China. In the 1990s, the average monthly income for Korean Chinese workers in South Korea was about 830,000 won (roughly US$900), nearly 20 times what they could earn in China. In other words, just two years of work in South Korea could equal more than 20 years' worth of income back home. Many of the Korean Chinese in South Korea send money back to their relatives who remained in China in the form of remittances, enriching the Chinese economy. In the ethnic-Korean majority Yanbian Korean Autonomous Prefecture, remittances from Joseonjok workers back to Yanbian exceeded the entire official financial income of the prefecture. Remittances made up one-third of Yanbian's GDP by 2011.

While economic prospects were better, those who moved back to South Korea reported disappointment and discrimination. Some faced harsh working conditions, discrimination, and social exclusion. One Joseonjok author wrote, "there is no place for us in this country". The Pescama incident, in which a group of Korean Chinese fishermen murdered South Korean crew members after alleged mistreatment aboard the steamship Pescama, sparked national debate and revealed resentment among some Joseonjok, who felt looked down upon despite shared ethnic roots. Many expressed frustration that, although South Koreans referred to them as “compatriots,” they were often treated as outsiders or second-class citizens.

=== Legal status ===
In 1996, the Ministry of Justice reported that over half of the approximately 60,000 Korean Chinese living in the country had overstayed their visas and were residing there illegally.

The Overseas Koreans Act, first enacted in 1999, aimed to make it easier for overseas Koreans to work and live in South Korea legally. It granted eligible overseas Koreans a special visa which allowed long-term stay, the right to work in most professions, the right to property ownership, access to national health insurance and pension schemes among other social services, though it still fell short of full citizenship. However, its narrow definition of “overseas Korean” — limited to those whose predecessors had left South Korea after its establishment in 1948 — largely excluded the Joseonjok, whose ancestors had migrated to China in the late 19th and early 20th centuries, long before South Korea was founded as a country. This exclusion sparked protests, including a hunger strike at Myeongdong Cathedral, and legal challenges that reached the Constitutional Court. In response, a 2004 presidential decree under President Roh Moo-hyun broadened the definition to include descendants of Koreans who had left the Korean peninsula before 1948, thereby finally extending eligibility to the Joseonjok.

Despite the amendment, many Joseonjok remained in a legal grey area. The law required official proof of ancestry, which many Joseonjok could not give because their ancestors had left the Korean peninsula over a century ago. Those unable to provide this documentation were excluded from legal benefits. As a result, many Korean Chinese already living and working in South Korea had no access to legal employment, healthcare, or residency rights, leaving them vulnerable to exploitation or deportation.

=== Population ===
According to a 2021 announcement by the Chinese government, the total global population of the Korean ethnic group with Chinese nationality stands at around 1.7 million, with Korean Chinese in China comprising about 42% of the total Korean ethnic population, amounting to 700,000 individuals. The population of Korean Chinese in South Korea has been continuously increasing since the 1990s. In 2007, the population was confirmed to be 330,000, which increased to 443,836 by May 2009, 447,000 by April 2011, 498,000 by 2017, and 540,000 by 2019. Including naturalized citizens and permanent residents, the population of Korean Chinese in South Korea reaches 708,000, which is significantly higher than the population of Korean ethnicity residing in Yanbian Korean Autonomous Prefecture (597,000 as of November 2020).

Additionally, as of the end of 2020, the total population of Korean Chinese in China was 1,702,479, comprising 872,372 females and 831,107 males.

== North Korea ==
The turning point for Koreans who had migrated to China, but later returned in the opposite direction to the Korean Peninsula, was the fall of Japanese colonial rule. The peak of the return migration to the peninsula was about two years after liberation, during which time approximately 700,000 Koreans in China, equivalent to a third of their total population, returned. The return of Korean Chinese took place in several phases from just before the outbreak of the Korean War until the early 1960s. Tens of thousands returned on the eve of the war, and during the war, tens of thousands more moved under the guise of support. After the armistice, North Korea's primary challenge in economic reconstruction was a labor shortage. The Chinese government organized the migration of Korean Chinese to North Korea to assist with this reconstruction. When the Chinese government organized this migration, around 60,000 Korean Chinese who identified with their peninsular roots migrated to North Korea and adopted North Korean citizenship. The massive illegal migration of Korean Chinese to North Korea peaked in 1961 and 1962, with almost 100,000 "defectors from China" in less than two years. Throughout this migration, the Chinese government always respected North Korea's opinions and considered its stance. Of course, the notion of the Korean homeland provided the ideological and emotional foundation for everyday movements, and it's evident that this was the basis for the large-scale return of Korean Chinese to North Korea. The movement to North Korea and the ethnic identity of Korean Chinese are closely related. For those who either remained in China or returned after migrating to North Korea, the migratory process from liberation until the early 1960s was also a period when the Korean Peninsula's ethnic identity gradually dissolved and the identity of Korean Chinese in China, which means the ethnic Korean with Chinese (PRC) citizenship was established.

== The Korean War ==
Korean Chinese soldiers affiliated with the Chinese Communist Party and Soviet army were incorporated into the North Korean army, and many Korean Chinese participated in the Korean War. In fact, there were conflicts between Chaoxianzu and United States Army and South Koreans during the war. Due to differences in regime and other factors, interactions between Korean Chinese and South Korea were suspended for a long time.

== See also ==
- Chinese people in Korea
- Korean Chinese in Japan
- Return migration
