= Kim Chin-kyung =

Kim Chin Kyung (also spelled Kim Jin Kyong and known as James Kim in the United States) born 1935 in Keijo (Seoul), Japanese Korea is a professor of economics and a builder of international institutes of higher learning. He holds a United States passport, but also an honorary permanent Chinese citizenship. He was held as a political prisoner of Kim Jong Il in 1998.

== Early life ==
Kim wanted to join the South Korean army when the Korean War broke out in 1950, but was initially rejected since he was too young. After having signed a petition with his own blood he was allowed to join a student battalion, however, where he was one of only 17 survivors out of 800 fighters.

== Career ==
=== Yanbian University of Science and Technology ===
In 1992, Kim founded the Yanbian University of Science and Technology (YUST) in the North-Eastern part of China, inside the Yanbian Korean Autonomous Prefecture, and served as its first president.

=== Pyongyang University of Science and Technology ===
Kim was also the driving force behind the creation of the Pyongyang University of Science and Technology (PUST), the first joint venture institute of higher learning inside North Korea that is founded, funded and operated jointly by both North and South Korean associations and individuals. The PUST project was started in 2001, and was scheduled to be open in 2003 but only took in its first class in 2010. In 2012 it had 267 students of whom 200 were undergraduates.

== Awards ==
Among honours won for Kim are the KBS Award to the Outstanding Overseas Countryman of the Year (1995); Honorary Citizenship to the city of Seoul (1995); Honorary Permanent Citizenship to China (1998); and the Korean Peony Prize for Distinguished Service (2002).
