= Toudao, Helong =

Town in Jilin, China

Toudao is a town in Helong, Yanbian, Jilin. Toudao Town administers Jiangbei Community, Jiangnan Community, Yanfeng Village, Mingxing Village, Sanhe Village, Longping Village, Longxin Village, Guangxin Village, Longhai Village, Longhu Village, Xinmin Village, Longyuan Village, Longshui Village, Changren Village, Longmen Village, Qinglong Village, Xinbei Village and Zhenxing Village.

The population is 32,036 and there are 10,438 households. 75% of the total population are ethnically Korean. Toudao covers an area of 513 sq km.

Toudao is known for its rice production. Three state-owned forest farms are located in Toudao.

The Ancient Tombs at Longtoushan are located in Toudao.
