= 2024 Helong North Korean migrant workers unrest =

Strike and civil unrest in Helong, China

2024 Helong civil unrest
- Date: 11–14 January 2024 (3 days)
- Location: Helong, Yanbian Korean Autonomous Prefecture, Jilin, China
- Caused by: Withholding of payments caused by COVID-19 lockdowns
- Goals: Payment of owed wages
- Result: Workers ended their occupation after authorities agreed to repayment

Parties
North Korean migrant workers	North Korean authorities

Casualties and losses
	1 dead; 3 injured

According to South Korean sources, between 11 and 14 January 2024, several thousand North Korean migrant workers in the Chinese city of Helong went on strike over unpaid wages. The civil unrest ended after North Korean authorities agreed to distribute several months' worth of pay to the workers. While many of the sources that reported on the event cited a senior analyst at the Korea Institute for National Unification (KINU) and a North Korean defector who claimed to have informants in the region, Chinese authorities have denied that the incidents occurred and several news sources, including Newsweek and Reuters, have stated that they have been unable to independently verify the stories.

In China, several thousand migrant workers from North Korea are employed in factories and food processing plants. This work program is in violation of United Nations sanctions, and workers in the program are often subject to abuse, including the withholding of payment. These issues were further exacerbated by the COVID-19 lockdowns, during which time many North Korean workers in China were barred from reentering North Korea. Additionally, workers during the time reported that they had not received some of their payments, with the North Korean government withholding the money.

South Korean sources claim that, on 11 January, workers at a plant in Helong initiated a factory occupation, took several managers and plant officials hostage, and vowed to not resume work until they had been paid. On 14 January, one of the hostages was killed. That day, North Korean officials brought an end to the dispute by distributing payments to the involved workers. In total, the protests and work stoppages had affected over ten plants in the city and had involved between 2,000 and 3,000 workers. These events were reported on by Cho Han-bum, a senior analyst at KINU, and Ko Young-hwan, a North Korean defector. Following the unrest, North Korean officials repatriated about 100 workers and imprisoned them.

Multiple sources highlighted the rarity of such incidents of civil unrest among North Korean citizens, with several academics opining that the events in Helong could spur further unrest in other locations. In mid-February 2024, there were reports of a similar work stoppage in the Chinese border city of Dandong, with North Korean workers demanding to return home.

== Background ==
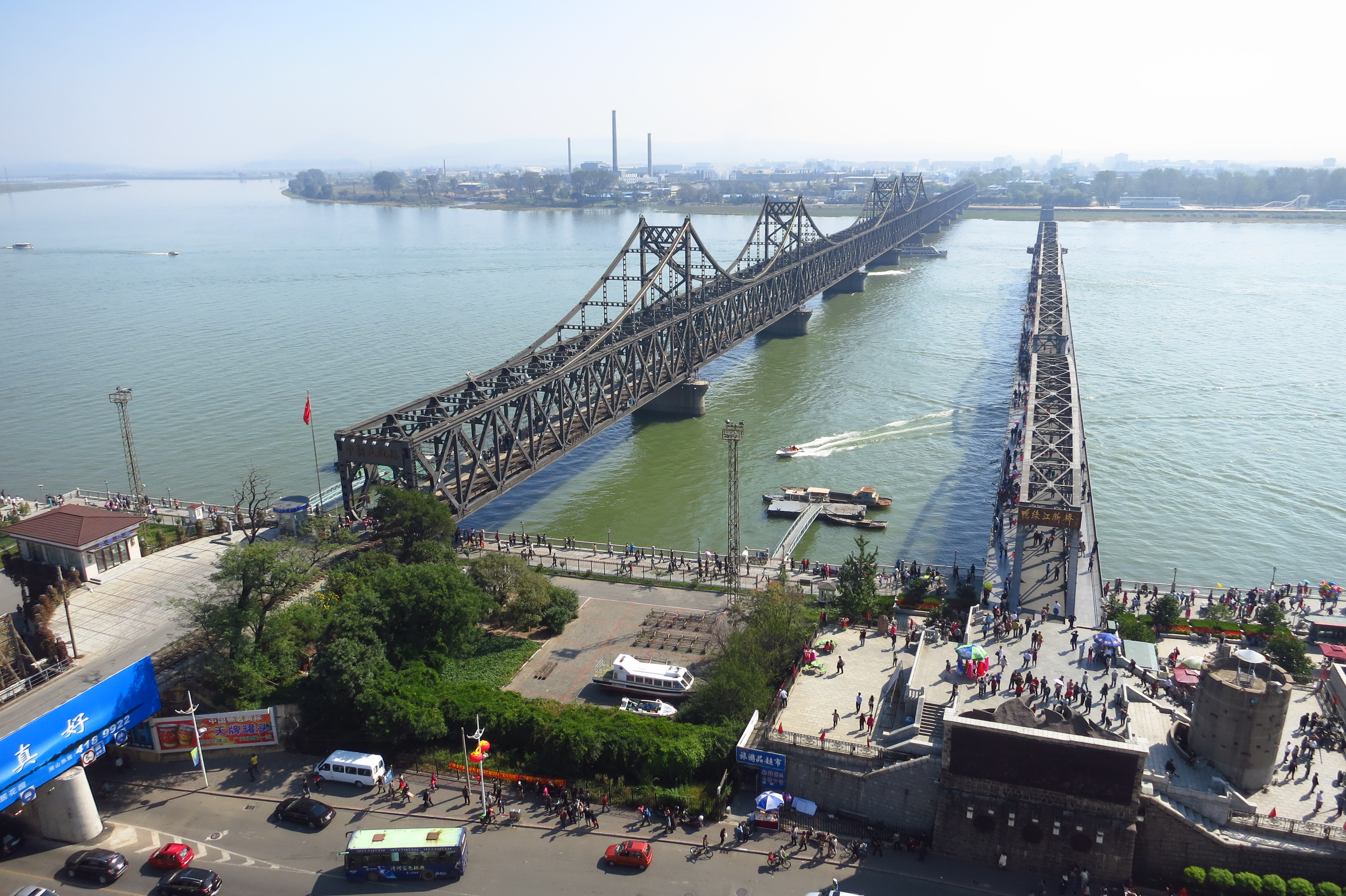
The Sino-Korean Friendship Bridge (left) spans the Yalu River between China and North Korea.

In China, many North Koreans are employed as migrant workers, in fields including food processing, manufacturing, and construction. The migrant worker program is overseen by multiple government agencies, including Room 39, and in 2012, a Seoul-based think tank estimated that the program generated approximately $2.3 billion (equivalent to $3.2 billion in 2025) for the government of North Korea. That year, there were roughly 40,000 North Koreans working in China. Chinese companies are incentivized to hire North Koreans because they are often paid about a quarter of what a Chinese worker would be paid and are usually excluded from social welfare programs, such as retirement and parental leave.

Jobs in the country are often sought out by North Koreans due to higher wages. In 2024 article for The New Yorker, investigative journalist Ian Urbina reported that contracts for migrant workers in China averaged about $270 per month, with comparable jobs in North Korea paying only around $3 per month. Some workers bribe government officials in order to participate in the migrant work program, sometimes taking out loans from loan sharks in order to do so. However, migrant workers are often subject to poor working and living conditions. Often, the workers have to sign up for a two- to three-year contract and have their passports confiscated when they arrive at their place of work. Additionally, managers often withhold payments until the end of their workers' contracts. According to Urbina, due to fees and managers keeping some of the money for themselves, workers typically take home less than ten percent of what they were promised in their contract. Also, worker deaths often go unreported and sexual exploitation of the female employees is common, with many workers reporting sexual abuse from managers. According to Remco Breuker, a Korean studies professor at Leiden University, "Hundreds of thousands of North Korean workers have for decades slaved away in China and elsewhere, enriching their leader and his party while facing unconscionable abuse".

Following the 2017 North Korean nuclear test, the United Nations passed sanctions that prohibited North Korean nationals from working abroad. Despite these sanctions, many North Korean nationals continue to work in China, with a 2022 estimate from Chinese officials claiming that 80,000 North Koreans were working in Dandong, a city on the China–North Korea border. According to Urbina, the migrant workers are an "open secret" in China.

== Civil unrest ==
On 29 January 2024, the South Korean newspaper The Korea Times published an article quoting Cho Han-bum, a senior analyst at the Korea Institute for National Unification, who said that there had been a series of violent protests between 11 and 15 January conducted by North Korean migrant workers at more than ten textile factories in Helong, a city in the Yanbian Korean Autonomous Prefecture, located in the northeastern Chinese province of Jilin. Cho's claims were supported by Ko Young-hwan, a former diplomat from North Korea who defected to South Korea in the 1990s, who said that informants of his in the region had told him that thousands of North Korean workers in clothing factories and fishery processing plants in the area had been engaged in protesting. In an interview given with the online newspaper NK News, Cho stated that the factories were managed by North Korea's Ministry of Defence, with the Singaporean newspaper The Straits Times further stating that the factory workers were "dispatched by a trading company operated by the country's military". Multiple sources put the number of workers involved in the protest at about 2,000, with some claiming a figure of up to 3,000. In a February 2024 interview, Ko stated that the incident involved about 2,500 to 3,000 workers.

=== Causes ===
According to Ko, his informants told him that the protests stemmed from overdue wage payments. Per Cho, the protests occurred after workers in the city discovered that, for years, their pay had been sent to the Workers' Party of Korea without their consent or knowledge. The American news magazine Newsweek, which described the protests as a "wage strike", reported workers at roughly 15 garment factories in the region were owed approximately US$10 million in backpay for between four and seven years of labor. Reporting from The Straits Times said that resentment over "lingering pandemic lockdowns" also played a role in the furor. Per the newspaper, some of the migrant workers had been in China for several years, as they were unable to return to North Korea due to border lockdowns caused by the COVID-19 pandemic. According to The Japan News, following the border closures, the North Korean enterprises withheld all money from the workers for "war preparation funds". The newspaper further stated that the civil unrest had commenced after factory workers in China had heard rumors that workers who had returned to North Korea had not received their payments. In a statement to Reuters regarding the unrest, South Korea's National Intelligence Service said, "Various incidents and accidents have been happening due to poor living conditions of North Korean workers dispatched overseas, so we are checking on related movements", offering no further clarification.

=== Factory occupation and later developments ===
According to The Japan News, on 11 January, North Korean workers at a food processing plant and clothing factory located near the Tumen River in Helong initiated a factory occupation, vowing to go on strike until their wages were paid. Workers proceeded to destroy factory equipment, including kitchen utensils and sewing machines, and take several managers and North Korean officials hostage, additionally subjecting them to physical assault. Multiple sources stated that a large number of the women involved in the occupation were women in their 20s who had formerly served as soldiers. North Korean authorities at the Chinese consulate responded by sending members of the Ministry of State Security and secret police officers, though workers barred them from entering the factory. On 14 January, the workers beat to death one of the hostages. Three others were wounded. According to Cho, the protests ended after North Korean officials agreed to distribute several months' worth of salaries to the involved workers.

== Aftermath ==
Following the riots, multiple sources stated that North Korean officials had identified about two hundred workers who had taken on leadership roles in the riots and had repatriated about half of them to serve terms in political prison. Ko stated that North Korean authorities stopped short of arresting more workers who had been involved in the unrest due to the value that the workers brought to the government through their work. Concerning the protests, journalist Ju-min Park wrote for Reuters:

Large-scale protests by North Koreans are virtually unheard of, and the researchers said it suggests these labourers are caught in a disagreement over their fate: China wants to send them home to comply with UN resolutions and avoid defections, but North Korea wants to maintain the number of labourers there.

Multiple sources reflected on the rarity of similar incidents of civil unrest among North Korean citizens, with Ko saying that the disorder was part of a recent uptick in violence in North Korea. Further discussing this, journalist Wendy Teo of the Straits Times opined that the unrest could be indicative of a loosening of social control that North Korean leader Kim Jong Un's administration was experiencing at the time. He also stated that similar unrest could restart if wage payments were to again cease. The Japan News also reported that "the impact of the Yanbian incident is likely to spread to other regions" where North Korean migrant workers had been stationed. In mid-February, Cho reported that there had been claims of a similar work stoppage in Dandong, with the North Korean workers there demanding a return to their home country.

== Disputed claims ==
In their coverages of the incidents, both Reuters and Newsweek reported that they were unable to independently verify Cho's claims, citing the difficulty in getting information regarding North Korean migrant workers in China. According to the news magazine, the earliest reports of unrest among factory workers in the region stemmed from an interview Ko gave earlier in the month with the Japanese newspaper Sankei Shimbun. However, Peter Jung, the head of the Justice for North Korea rights group, disputed these claims, telling NK News that he had received confirmation from local workers in the region and public security authorities that no violent protests had occurred. Additionally, Reuters reported that Chinese officials had stated that they were "not aware" of any unrest in the area. Discussing the matter, Jae-Pyoung Seo, the director of the Association of North Korean Defectors, stated that it was possible that the protests had occurred as reported by Cho and Ko, citing previous incidents of wage disputes going back several years regarding migrant workers in China, as well as recent discussions on Jilin websites about the "wage arrears" among an unspecified group of migrant workers.
