= Paensae =

North Korean holiday dish

Paensae (Korean: 밴새; RR: baensae), alternatively spelled paense (밴세; baense) is a traditional holiday food eaten in North Korea and the Yanbian Korean Autonomous Prefecture of China. The dough can be made with rice (입쌀밴새; ipssalbaensae) or with potato (감자밴새; gamjabaensae; kamjabaensae).

== North Korea ==
Paensae is traditionally served during Chuseok, an annual holiday in both Koreas. Beans, vegetables and minced pork are added into a dough made from leaf powder (나뭇잎 가루; namunnip garu; namunnip karu) shaped into palm sized pieces and steamed.

== China ==
Primarily eaten in the province of Yanbian, which has the largest concentration of ethnic Koreans in the country, with around 1/3 of the population being Korean. Typically eaten during Chinese New Year festivities. Some buns are made with coins inside, and it is believed that whoever eats the bun with the coins inside will receive good luck.
