= YIA =

YIA may refer to:

- Yanbian International Academy
- Yogyakarta International Airport
