= Pyongyang University of Science and Technology =

University in North Korea

Coordinates: 38°57′15.5″N 125°42′4″E

- 평양과학기술대학
- Established: October 2010; 16 years ago
- Affiliations: Northeast Asia Foundation for Education and Culture (NAFEC)
- Chairman: Dr James Chin-Kyung Kim
- President: Dr Yu-Taik Chon
- Administrative staff: 45 (excluding DPRK staff)
- Students: 638
- Undergraduates: 543
- Postgraduates: 95
- Location: Pyongyang, North Korea
- Nickname: PUST
- Website: pust.co

- Pyongyang University of Science and Technology
- Hangul: 평양과학기술대학
- Hanja: 平壤科學技術大學
- RR: Pyeongyang gwahak gisul daehak
- MR: P'yŏngyang kwahak kisul taehak

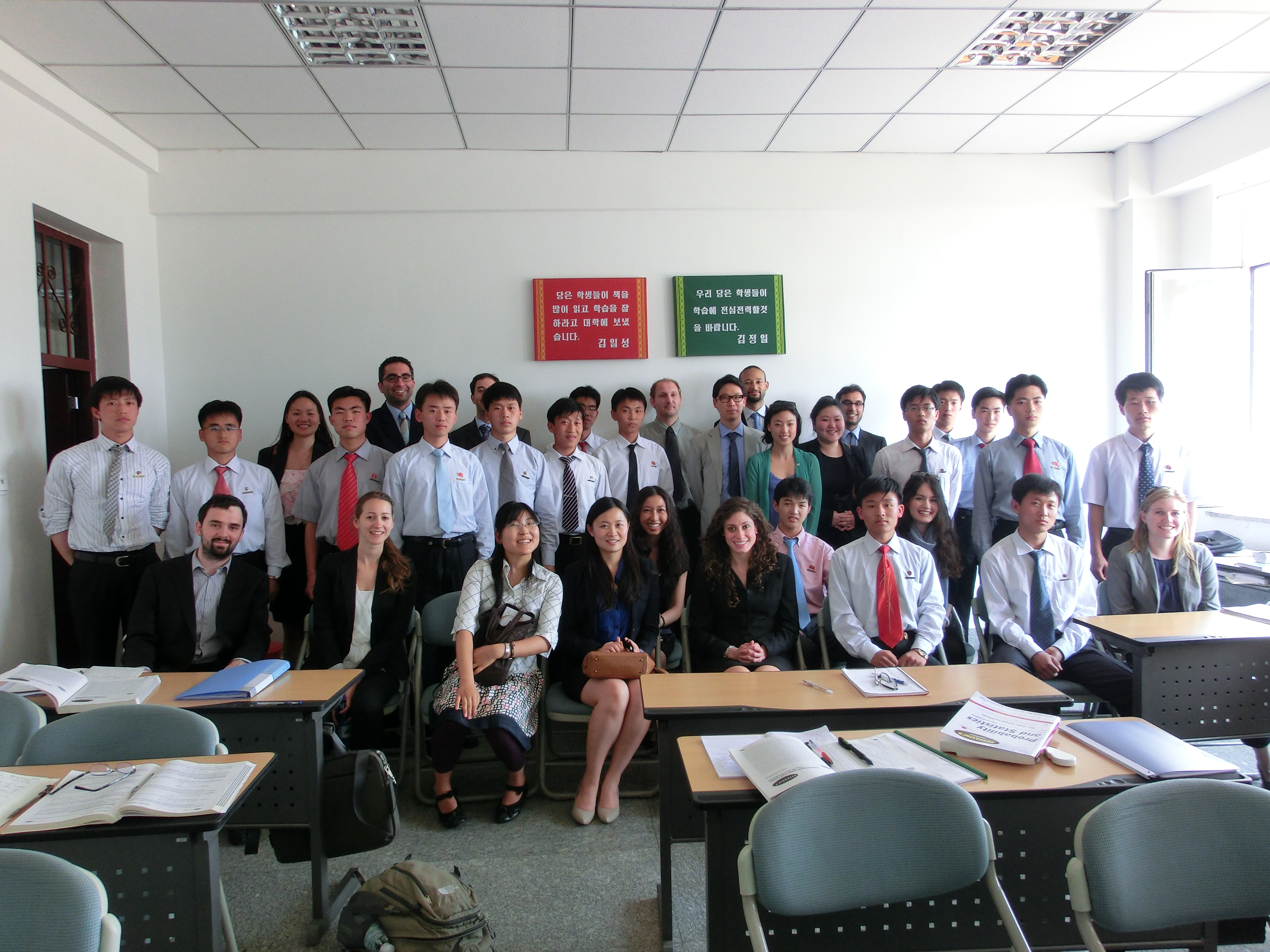
PUST students pose with visitors from SIPA during a math class of Prof. Dr. Jerome Philippe COSS, Ph.D.

Pyongyang University of Science and Technology (PUST) is North Korea's first privately funded university. It is founded, operated, and partly funded by associations and people outside the country. PUST was jointly planned and constructed by forces from both North and South Korea, along with contributions from groups and individuals from other nations, in particular China and the United States. The initiative is largely funded by Evangelical Christian movements. Originally scheduled for launch in 2003, the project was delayed for several years and began operations in October 2010.

== History ==
The university is located in the countryside outside of Pyongyang in a separate but nearby administrative region with permission required to enter and exit the campus. After introductory negotiations, PUST project started in 2001, as an initiative of Professor Kim Chin Kyung, endorsed in a personal meeting with former North Korean leader Kim Jong-Il. Professor Kim is the founding president of Yanbian University of Science and Technology (YUST) in northeastern China inside the Yanbian Korean Autonomous Prefecture, founded in 1992. PUST has cooperated with YUST and drew on their experiences.

With the exception of foreign language courses, all teaching is conducted in English. All foreign faculty work as volunteers and most come from a Christian background, with the founding president and now chairman saying:

"While the skills to be taught are technical in nature, the spirit underlying this historic venture is unabashedly Christian...."

PUST construction plans were politically troubled and slowed down in 2005 and 2006, in connection with the 2006 North Korean nuclear test, but later on were resumed and completed. PUST celebrated its grand opening in September 2009 and its official opening in October 2010. It had planned to enrol up to 200 higher-level students per year, from both parts of Korea. Plans include the hiring of up to 250 faculty members from universities and research institutions in South Korea, China, the United States, and other countries. PUST classes began in the fall of October 2010. As a joint venture university, PUST is seen as a contribution to the Korean reunification process.

Kim Hak Song, who managed a farm run by the agriculture department of the university, was detained on charges of committing “hostile criminal acts” against the country on 6 May 2017. Another US citizen, Kim Sang-duk, who also worked for the university, had been arrested on similar charges on April 22. They both were released on May 8, 2018, into U.S. Secretary of State Mike Pompeo's custody after overtures were made for a meeting to be held between President Donald Trump and Supreme Leader Kim Jong-un in June 2018.

Due to a ban on Americans travelling to North Korea issued by the U.S. State Department in mid-July 2017, the university had to start the fall semester without its dozens of American staffers in September, who comprised roughly 60 out of 130 foreigners at the university, including faculty members, staffers and family members, as none of them received special permission to stay.

On October 3, 2019, PUST officially celebrated its 10-year anniversary by holding an international Conference (ICoPUST2019) on campus with more than 30 prominent international speakers.

Foreign professors were granted visas to return to the university in 2024, according to NK News.

According to a paper published by the Daily NK in May 2025, in the second half of 2025 Chinese faculty would start to teach basic medicine, smart agriculture, and applied statistics through both online and offline lectures.

As of 2025, due to the 2021 shutdown of the YUST partnership there is no information on which institutions these professors from China are coming from.

== Subjects ==
The goal of PUST is to contribute to North Korean economic development by producing professionals and leaders in technical disciplines, who are fluent in English and another foreign language (such as Chinese or German), and who are accustomed to working in an international setting. Bachelor of Science and doctorate degrees will be awarded in Electrical and Computer Engineering (ECE), Agriculture and Life Sciences (ALS), International Finance and Management (IFM), and Medical Sciences (DMS). The university has plans to open Construction Engineering as early as 2013.

Graduate students and professors have internet access, but it is filtered and monitored.

== See also ==
- List of universities in North Korea
- Suki Kim – author of Without You, There Is No Us: My Secret Life Teaching the Sons of North Korea’s Elite, a book about her experience teaching at PUST
