= Korean Chinese in Japan =

Ethnic minority with Chinese citizenship in Japan

在日朝鲜族 재일조선족

Languages
- Korean; Chinese languages Japanese

Related ethnic groups
- Chinese people in Japan, Korean Chinese

Korean Chinese in Japan, also called Chaoxianzu in Japan (Japanese: 在日朝鮮族; Korean: 재일조선족), are ethnic Koreans who hold Chinese nationality and reside in Japan. They have Korean (朝鲜族) listed as the ethnicity on their household registrations in China, but they are simply considered Chinese nationals by the Japanese government. Korean Chinese people constitute about 10% of the Chinese population in Japan, approximately 70,000 to 80,000 individuals.

Korean Chinese in Japan have very little historical connection with the Zainichi Korean community. It has been argued that the Korean Chinese society in Japan is very different from that of the Korean Chinese (Chaoxianzu) in Korea. The Korean Chinese community in Japan began to take shape in the late 1980s due to an influx of international students. This trend saw a significant increase in the mid-1990s as more Chinese people pursued higher education in Japan or other countries, marking a notable expansion of the Korean Chinese presence.

== See also ==
- Korean Chinese (Chaoxianzu)
- Korean Chinese in Korea (Joseonjok)
