= Korean International School in Yanbian =

- 연변한국국제학교 延边韩国国际学校

Location
- 2728 Chaoyang Street, Yanji City, Jilin Province China 133000 吉林省延吉市朝阳街2728 中国 133000; China
- Coordinates: 42.92292500000001°N 129.53088200000002°E

Information
- Website: www.kisy.or.kr

Korean International School in Yanbian (KISY; Korean: 연변한국국제학교; Chinese: 延边韩国国际学校) is a Korean international school in Yanji, Yanbian, Jilin, China. It serves students in elementary school through high school.

It was established on December 1, 1997. Prior to its opening, the Korean students in Yanji attended Yanbian International Academy, an English-language international school.

== See also ==
- Koreans in China
