= Yanbian Museum =

Museum in Jilin, People's Republic of China

Coordinates: 42.8877°N 129.4164°E

Yanbian Museum / 연변박물관
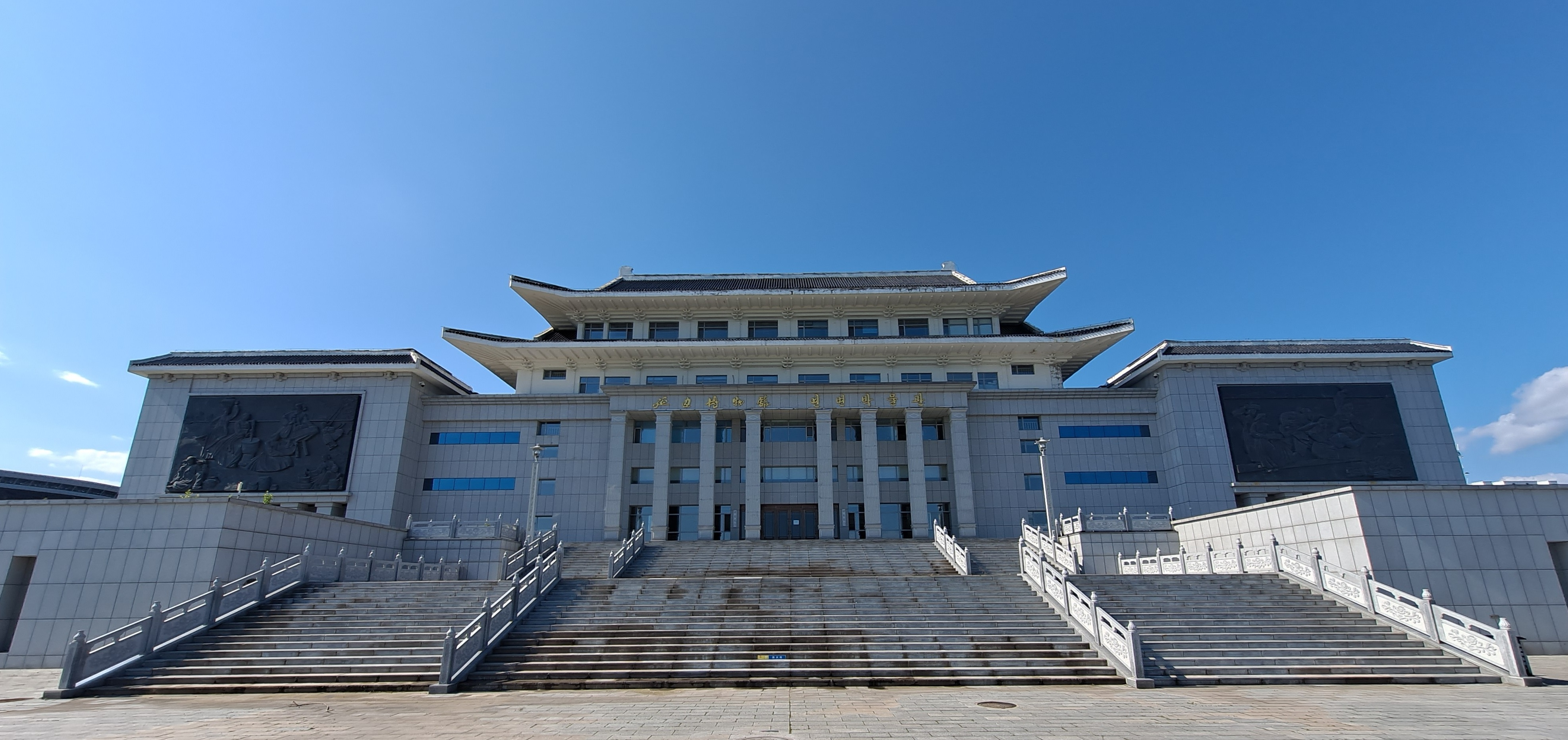
- Established: Preparation in 1960; Opened to the public in April 1982; Opened the new building in September 2012
- Location: Yanji, Yanbian Korean Autonomous Prefecture, Jilin Province, China
- Type: History museum Folklore museum Memorial museum
- Director: Jin Minghua
- Website: http://www.ybbwg.org.cn/

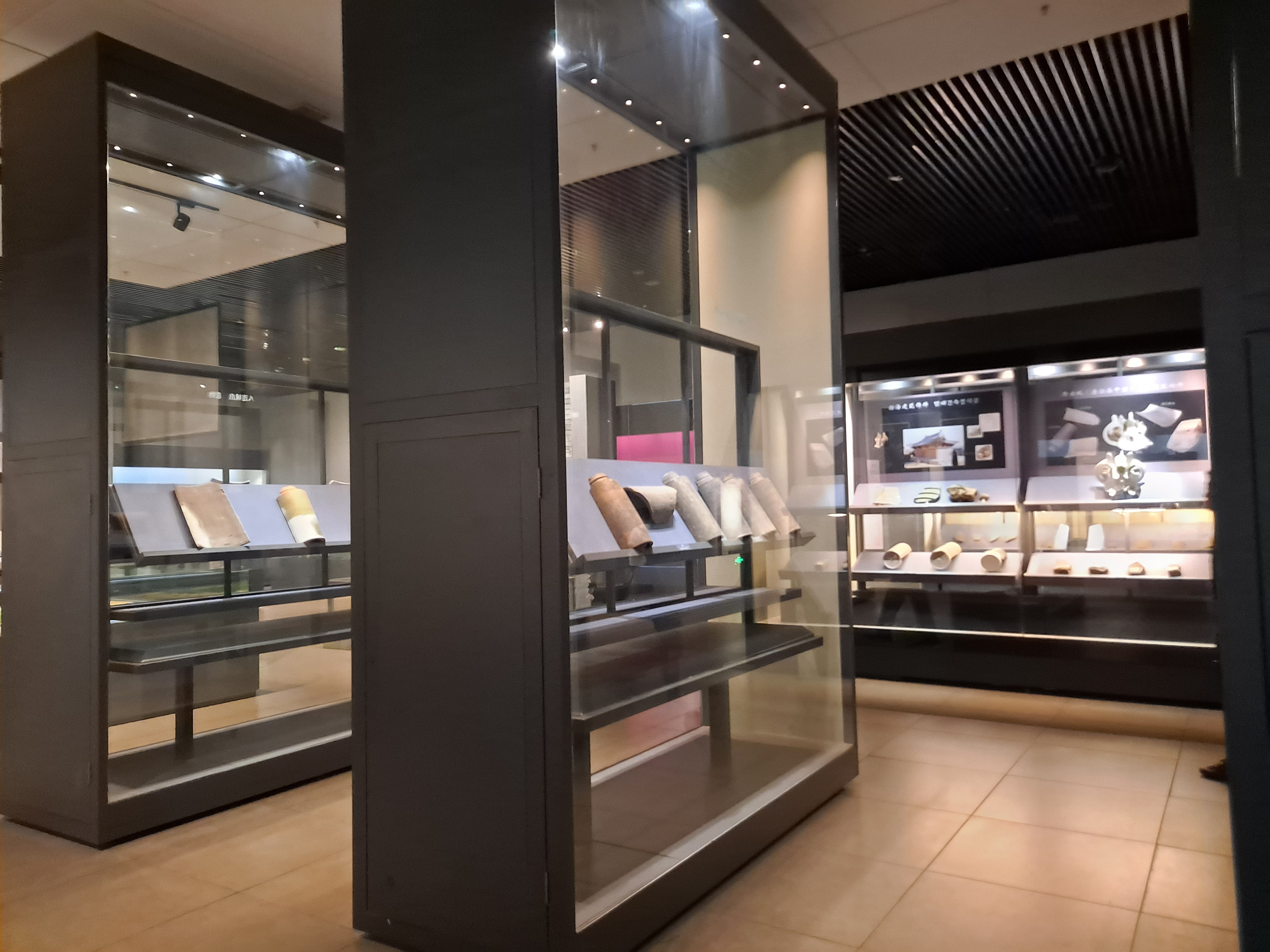
Bohai State Architectural Components and Decoration

Yanbian Museum (Chinese: 延边博物馆; Korean: 연변박물관) is a museum of Korean Chinese people located in Yanji, Yanbian Korean Autonomous Prefecture, Jilin, China. It is a national second-class comprehensive museum and national 4A-level tourist attraction. Along with Yanbian Korean Folk Museum, and Yanbian Korean Revolutionary Memorial Museum it covers Korean Chinese history and culture.

It covers more than 20,000 square meters, with a collection of nearly 15,000 artifacts. These include, Korean folklore, the history of China's Korean Revolutionary Struggle in three basic displays, as well as China's Korean Nongle Dance and two thematic exhibitions. In 2013, "Yanbian Korean Folklore Exhibition" won the 10th National Museum 10th Display and Exhibition Excellence 2012 Excellence Award.

== History ==
The history of Yanbian Museum began on April 19, 1960 when the Preparatory Office of Yanbian Museum was established to protect and manage Yanbian cultural relics. During the Cultural Revolution, the Preparatory Office was abolished and turned into an exhibition hall. After the end of the Cultural Revolution the Yanbian museum business was restored, and in January 1973 the Yanbian Museum was formally established.

In April 1982, the three-story Yanbian Museum premises was completed. It covered 12,350 square meters. The following year, the Yanbian Museum of Korean Folklore was approved, forming a set of two brands with the Yanbian Museum.

In 2002, to celebrate the 50th anniversary of the Yanbian Korean Autonomous Prefecture, a new Yanbian Museum building was constructed on the west side of Jindalai Plaza.

In 2007, after the Yanbian Korean Revolutionary Memorial Museum was approved for establishment, the Yanbian Museum became a set of three brands with one staff.

In 2009, Yanbian Museum was listed in the National Cultural Heritage Administration as a national second-class comprehensive museum. In order to meet the 60th anniversary of the establishment of Yanbian Korean Autonomous Prefecture, the Yanbian Museum's new hall began construction on June 10, 2010 at Changbaishan West Road, Yanji City. In September 2012, the new hall of the Yanbian Museum was opened. In 2014, the Yanbian Museum was selected as a national 4A-level tourist attraction.
