= Korean Chinese =

Ethnic Koreans with Chinese citizenship

Chaoxianzu / Korean Chinese
中国朝鲜族 (朝鲜族) 조선족 (Joseonjok)
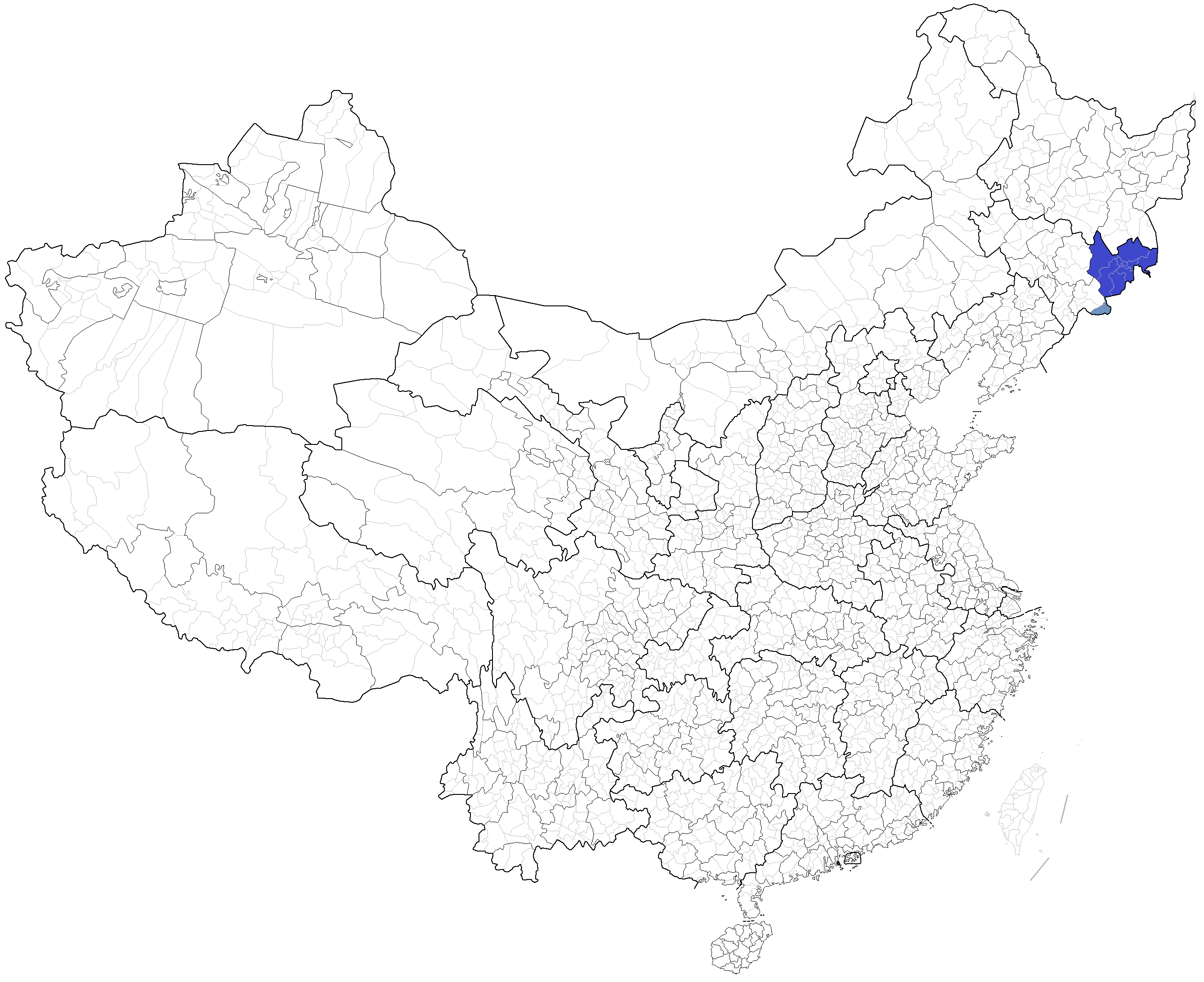
- Location of Yanbian Korean Autonomous Prefecture and Changbai Korean Autonomous County

Total population
- 1,702,479–1,893,763 (2023)

Regions with significant populations
- Jilin, Heilongjiang, Liaoning, Shandong peninsula, Beijing and other Chinese cities

Languages
- Korean; Mandarin Chinese

Religion
- Mahayana Buddhism · Christianity

Related ethnic groups
- Koreans

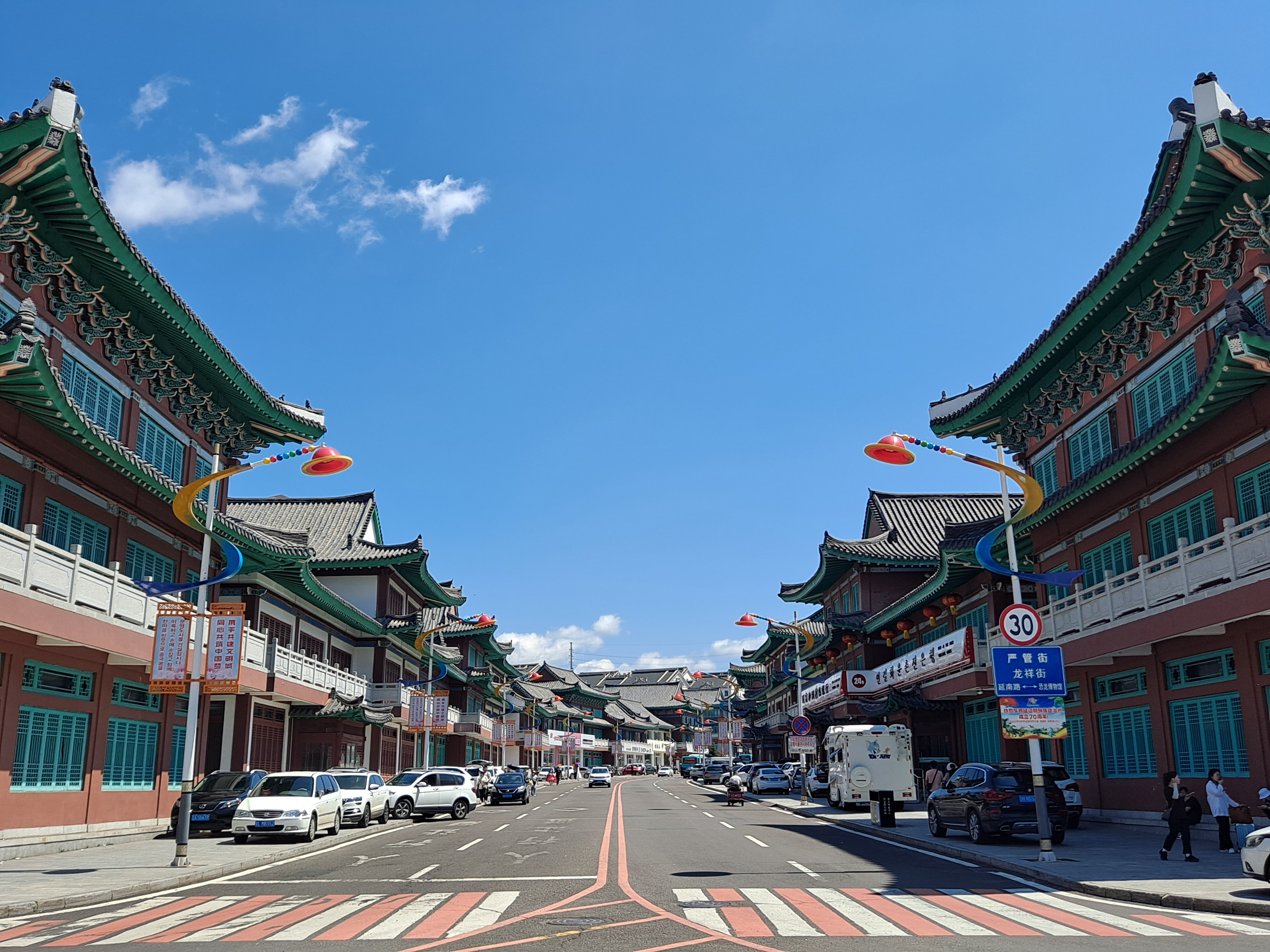
Korean Folk Park in Yanbian

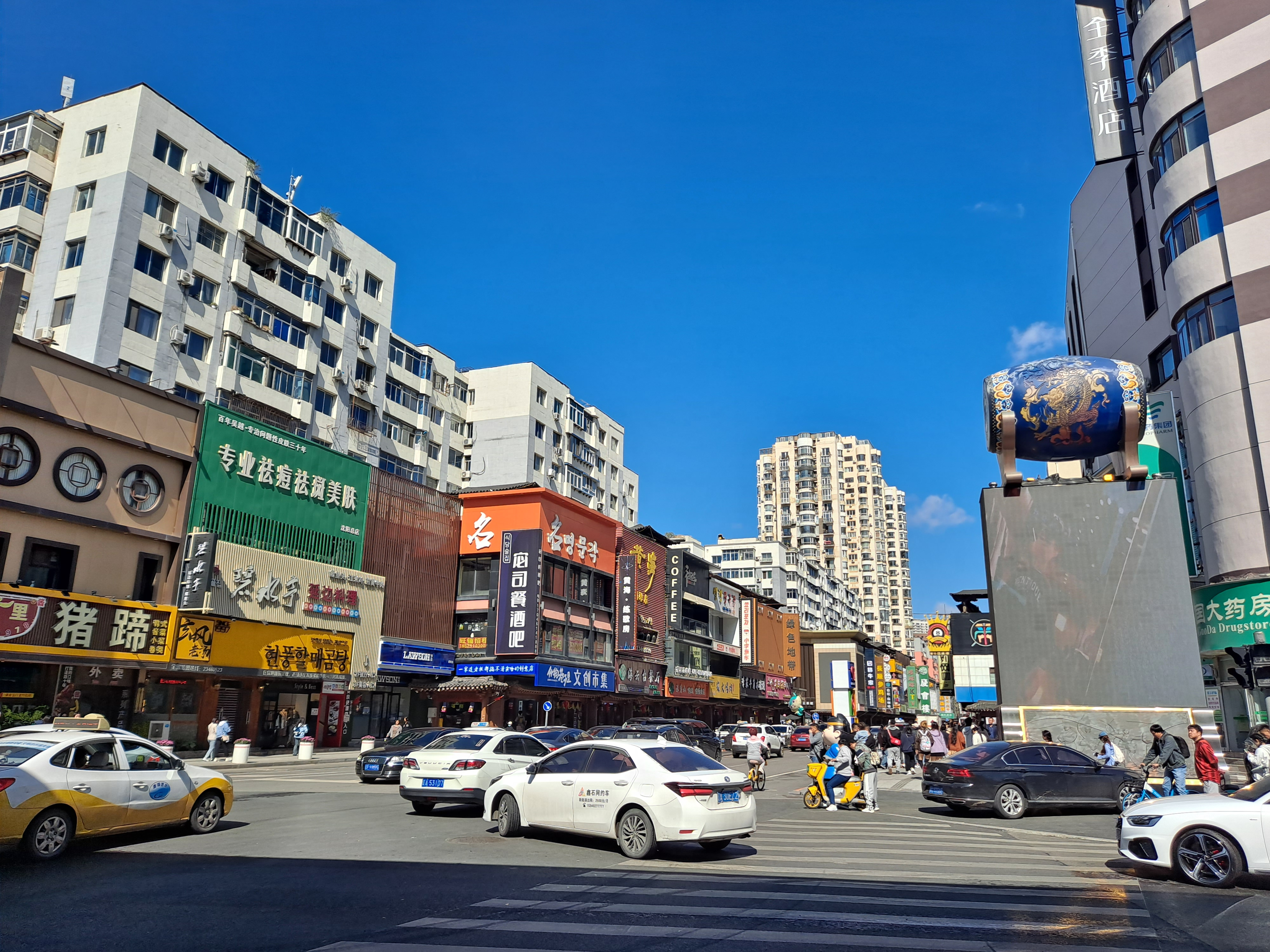
The Xita neighborhood in Shenyang, often cited as the world's 2nd largest Koreatown after Los Angeles.

Korean Chinese are Chinese citizens of Korean descent, who account for the vast majority of ethnic Koreans in China. The official term used in the People's Republic of China is Chaoxianzu (Chinese: 朝鲜族; Korean: 조선족; RR: Joseonjok, lit. "Joseon ethnicity"), a term that is used only occasionally outside of China. They are one of the 56 officially recognized ethnic groups by the Government of China and the Chinese Communist Party, and the 15th-largest ethnic minority in China according to the 2020 census. In South Korea, they are referred as "compatriots with Chinese nationality" (Korean: 중국국적동포; Chinese: 中国国籍同胞).

Most Korean Chinese are descendants of migrants from the Korean Peninsula who settled in Manchuria primarily between the late 19th and mid-20th centuries, especially during the famine in North Hamgyong in 1869–1870, after the Japanese annexation of Korea in 1910 and after the Japanese invasion of Manchuria in 1931. Many Koreans in Manchuria, both native descendants of prior immigrants and new refugees fleeing the Japanese-ruled home country, joined the Northeast Counter-Japanese United Army in guerilla warfare against the Japanese Kwantung Army and the puppet state of Manchukuo, among them a young Kim Il Sung, who later became the supreme leader of North Korea. After the Japanese defeat and end of the Second World War, some of the Korean migrants chose to stay and acquired Chinese citizenship, forming their own communities in various settlements in Northeast China, especially in the Yanbian Korean Autonomous Prefecture and Changbai Korean Autonomous County in Jilin province.

Consequently, Korean Chinese have a dual identity: a national identity as Chinese and a cultural identity as Koreans. Many Korean Chinese, educated under China's education system, often view the Korean War as an anti-imperialist struggle to "Resist America and Aid Korea", reflecting the official Chinese narrative.

== Terminology ==
The Chinese Communist Party had begun to include Koreans in official documents in 1928, however they had various terms to refer to them, such as: Gaoliren (高丽人; 'Goryeo people'), Hanren (韩人; 'Han people'), and Chaoxianren (朝鲜人; 'Joseon people'). These terms are today used to mean Koreans regardless of nationality, though are sometimes used interchangeably or erroneously by those unaware of their distinction. Following the first census in 1954, the term "Chaoxianzu" became the official name for the Korean ethnicity in China.

== History and population ==
Chaoxianzu's presence in China began intensively in the late 19th and early to mid-20th centuries. In the 1964 national census, the number of ethnic Koreans in China was reported at over 1.3 million, or 0.19% of the Chinese population. By 1982, this figure had grown by 30% to 1.7 million, but due to rapidly increasing birth rates across China, the overall proportion of Koreans actually dropped slightly to 0.18%. This ranked Chaoxianzu as the 11th largest minority in the country.

As of 2021, the Chinese government officially recognized a population of around 1.7 million Chaoxianzu. It is important to differentiate between Chaoxianzu and South Koreans who might have acquired Chinese nationality, which together may sum up to approximately 2.11 million in 2023, according to the Overseas Koreans Agency of South Korea.

Their total population of Chaoxianzu is 1,702,479 according to the 2021 Chinese government census. High levels of emigration to South Korea for better economic and financial opportunities have contributed to a decrease in their numbers in China. Conversely, it is estimated that 42% (Approximately 708,000) of this Korean Chinese population now resides in Korea, maintaining their Chinese nationality. They are called Jaehan Joseonjok (재한조선족) or Zaihan Chaoxianzu (在韩朝鲜族/在韓朝鮮族) (Chaoxianzu in Korea). Based on the data from the 7th population census conducted in 2020, it was observed that the population of the Chaoxianzu (Korean ethnic group in China with Chinese nationality) in Jilin Province has fallen below 1 million, indicating a trend of dispersion across China. Out of 1.7 million individuals, around 700,000 are economically active in South Korea. As of December 2019, the number of Chinese descendants residing in Korea amounted to 701,098, accounting for 27.8% of the total foreign population in Korea (2,524,656). This has made Chinese descendants the largest immigrant group in Korea.

Based on the data from the "Chinese Ethnic Culture Resources," the Chaoxianzu population makes up about 0.14% of China's total population of 1.4 billion, ranking them 13th among the country's ethnic groups. The official Chinese government's census in 2010 reported their population as approximately 1.83 million.

== Regions of residence ==
The majority of the Korean Chinese population resides in the Yanbian Korean Autonomous Prefecture, which holds special significance as China's first ethnic minority autonomous prefecture. There is also the Changbai Korean Autonomous County and various other regions in China with a lower population density of Korean Chinese. Notably, around 700,000 Korean Chinese, which constitutes over 41.2% of their total population, live or have established residency in South Korea.

== See also ==
- Chinese people
- Korean Chinese in Korea (Joseonjok)
- Korean Chinese in Japan (Chōsenzoku)
