= North Korean migrant workers =

Migrant labour originating from North Korea

Total population
- At least 100,000 (2019)

Regions with significant populations
- China: 80,000
- Russia: 40,000
- Kuwait: 5,000
- Qatar: 2,800
- United Arab Emirates: 1,300
- Mongolia: 1,200

Languages
- Korean

Related ethnic groups
- North Koreans (Koreans)

North Korean migrant workers are a significant source of finances for the North Korean state. Often working in hard labour fields such as construction, logging, textile production, or mining, migrant workers' conditions have been frequently described by human rights activists as a modern-day form of slavery. North Korean labourers are frequently found in China, Russia, and the Gulf states, although they are also located in other countries.

== Overview ==
North Korea began formally sending migrant workers abroad in 1967, following the signing of an agreement between the North Korean government and the Soviet Union which allowed North Koreans to work at logging camps in the Russian Far East. North Korean labour exports increased during the 2000s and peaked during the early 2010s, as part of an effort by the North Korean government to acquire foreign hard currencies. With the beginning of the COVID-19 pandemic in 2020, most migrant labourers were left stranded in their home countries as a result of stringent anti-pandemic protocols instituted by the North Korean government. Three-year contracts, typical for migrant labourers, were extended to as long as seven years.

Migrant workers have reportedly rioted on multiple instances, in contrast to tightly controlled North Korea. Of particular note was a January 2024 protest against non-payment of wages and working conditions in China, which allegedly involved as many as 3,000 factory labourers. Labourers are governed by the External Construction Guidance Bureau, part of the Ministry of Social Security.

=== Conditions ===
Anti-slavery non-governmental organisation Walk Free has criticised the overseas labour programme as being part of "state-imposed forced labour on a mass scale". Workers' payment is frequently withheld or collected by the North Korean government, and injuries or fatalities caused by work accidents are frequent. Aidan McQuade, director of human rights group Anti-Slavery International, further said that descriptions of working conditions indicate "state-sponsored trafficking for forced labour". According to defector Kim Joo-il, 70% of salary is taken by the government directly, with an additional 20% being paid to the government, ostensibly as fees for food and housing, leaving only 10% for the worker. Other defectors have stated that workers will usually receive nothing, only getting the 10% of their pay in "very extreme" circumstances.

== Migrant workers by country or region ==
=== Belarus ===
An unknown number of North Korean migrant workers are present in Belarus. According to the pro-government BelNovosti portal, North Korean migrant labourers have participated in construction or reconstruction of several buildings in Belarusian capital of Minsk, such as the Independence Palace, the Belarus Hotel. A high-level agreement between the North Korean and Belarusian governments in 2014 established greater opportunities for migrant labourers to work in Belarus.

=== China ===
China hosts the largest amount of North Korean migrant workers, estimated at 80,000 by the East–West Center and National Committee on North Korea in 2019. Most North Korean migrant labourers in China work in textiles and garments, though many also work in the food processing industry, particularly in seafood processing. Several of their products are exported to United States retailers such as Walmart and ShopRite. In January 2024, several thousand migrant workers in the border city of Helong initiated a series of protests over withheld payments.

=== Gulf states ===
Aside from Russia and China, the Arab states of the Persian Gulf are among the largest employers of North Korean migrant labour; Kuwait had 5,000 North Korean workers in the country in 2019. Labourers from North Korea participated in a 2017 construction project on Al Dhafra Air Base, a joint United Arab Emirates air base hosting the 380th Air Expeditionary Wing of the United States Air Force, and multiple restaurants run by the North Korean government also operate in the country.

North Korean migrant labourers were heavily involved in the 2022 FIFA World Cup. The Qatari government reported in 2014 that 2,800 North Koreans were involved in the construction of facilities for the World Cup, though it denied media reports that North Koreans were working in conditions of slavery.

Oman expelled 300 of 380 North Korean migrant workers in December 2016.

=== Mongolia ===
Mongolia has historically been one of the top employers of North Korean migrant labour and among the few democracies to use labourers, drawing criticism from human rights organisations such as Human Rights Watch. In response to increased pressure from the United Nations, Mongolia began refusing to renew visas for workers in 2017, vowing to send the remainder home by the end of 2018. Prior to being expelled, many North Koreans worked in construction, and made roughly ₮400,000 monthly in comparison to the ₮600,000 average monthly wage of Mongolian workers.

=== Poland ===
North Korean migrant labour in Poland has been a source of continued controversy, and a small group of workers remained in the country by mid-2017, despite several attempts to repatriate them. According to a 2017 report by the Polish State Labour Inspectorate, 450 North Koreans were employed by at least 19 companies. An investigation by The New York Times revealed additional North Korean labourers at two other companies.

=== Russia ===
Russia is the second-largest importer of North Korean labour after China, as of 2019. North Koreans have worked in Russia since the Soviet Union, and primarily work in Siberia's logging industry, though they have also worked in construction. North Korean migrant workers in Russia have frequently sent products back to their home country, aiding in the development of the country's black market.

==== Russian-occupied territories ====
As of 2019 an estimated 400 North Koreans are working in the self-proclaimed state of Abkhazia, which is internationally recognised as a part of Georgia under Russian military occupation. According to The Washington Post, the presence of migrant workers in Abkhazia is part of an effort by the Russian government to sidestep international obligations on the repatriation of North Korean workers, as Abkhazia is not recognised as a subject of international law by the United Nations.

Following the beginning of the Russian invasion of Ukraine and the subsequent Russian occupation of Ukrainian territories, North Korean migrant labourers were sent to work in the Russian-occupied Donbas region. According to The Diplomat citing North Korean sources and Daily NK, North Korean workers have been primarily involved with the reconstruction of buildings damaged during the war.
