= Yanbian International Academy =

Yanbian International Academy 延边外国人学校

Location
- 2728B Chaoyang Street, Yanji City, Jilin Province China 133000 吉林省延吉市朝阳街2728B 外国人学校 中国 133000; China
- Coordinates: 42.92292500000001°N 129.53088200000002°E

Information
- Website: web.archive.org/*/https://yiachina.org

Yanbian International Academy (YIA; 延边外国人学校 "Yanbian Foreigners' School") is a K-12 international school in Yanji, Yanbian, China. It is a part of the Yanbian University of Science and Technology.

== History ==
YIA opened in 1997 as a quasi-homeschool run by a group of mothers, teaching English and Korean. There were 25 students in this homeschooling group. Dr. James Wooton became the first headmaster of YIA in the fall of 1998. The student body was reduced to 14 at the time because some of the original students transferred to the Yanbian Korean School when it opened.

The school had ten part-time teachers and five full-time teachers at the time. When Lee Nichols took over as headmaster in the fall of 2000, the student body had grown to 30. There was one fewer full-time teacher at the time, but the number of part-time teachers increased to 17. Scott Kim took over as headmaster in the fall of 2013.

The student body is currently stabilized at 53 in November 2017.
