= Yanbian University of Science and Technology =

Private university in Jilin, China

- 延大科学技术学院 (Chinese) 연변과학기술대학 (Korean)
- Other names: 延科大 / YUST
- Motto: Truth, Peace, Love
- Type: Private
- Active: 1992–2021
- President: Chin Kyung Kim (김진경)
- Academic staff: c. 400 (incl staff)
- Undergraduates: c. 1,800
- Location: Yanji, Jilin, China; 42.9264°N 129.5250°E
- Website: www.yust.edu ifec.or.kr

Chinese name
- Simplified Chinese: 延大科学技术学院
- Traditional Chinese: 延大科學技術學院
Transcriptions
Standard Mandarin
- Hanyu Pinyin: Yándà Kēxué Jìshù Xuéyuàn

Chinese Korean name
- Chosŏn'gŭl: 연변과학기술대학
- Hancha: 延大科學技術學院
Transcriptions
- Revised Romanization: Yeonbyeon gwahak gisul daehak
- McCune–Reischauer: Yŏnbyŏn kwahak kisul taehak

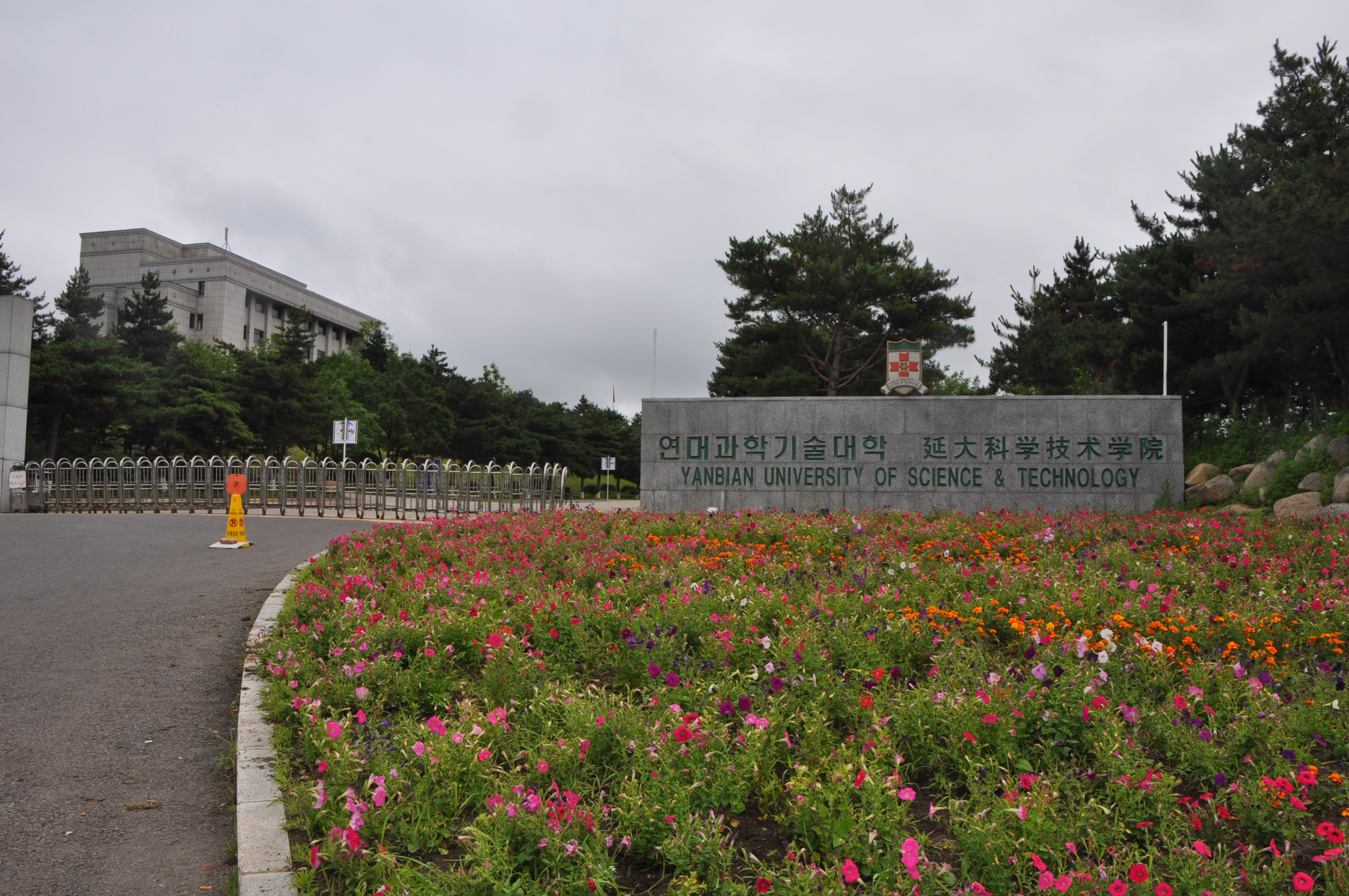
YUST Main Gate

The Yanbian University of Science and Technology (YUST; Chinese: 延大科学技术学院, Korean: 연변과학기술대학), is a research university in the city of Yanji, Jilin, China.

YUST is the first Korean Chinese joint-venture university in the Yanbian Korean Autonomous Prefecture and first international university in China.

== History ==
=== 1990–1995 ===
- January 1990 A foundation for the Chinese-Korean Technology University is established and registered legally in the United States.
- March 1990 The three-year technical college becomes a four-year technology university.
- March 1991 The Jilin Province Board of Education ratifies the establishment of the university.
- April 1991 The YUST Supporters’ Committee is approved by the South Korean Foreign Affairs Department.
- June 1991 The Chinese National Board of Education ratifies the establishment of the university.
- June 1992 The university and the Chinese National Institute of Science and Technology ratify the Yanbian Mid and Long Range Land Development Plan
- September 1992 The university is renamed Yanbian University of Science and Technology. The Industrial Technology Training School, an auxiliary branch of YUST, is established. (It is composed of the Industrial Information Training Institute, the Construction Technology Training Institute, and the Kia Training Institute.) The main buildings and the academic buildings are finished.
- April 1993 A committee for development and promotion is organized.
- July 1993 The first graduation ceremony of the Industrial Information Training Institute is held (200 students).
- September 1993 A four-year college and a two-year college of YUST start classes. The East Asia Technology Training Institute is founded. The second opening ceremony for the Kia Training Institute is held. Construction of the cafeteria and dormitory are completed.
- October 1993 An academic exchange program is established with Yonsei University.
- April 1994 An academic exchange program is established with Songsil University.
- September 1994 The four-year college, the two-year college, and the East Asia and Kia Training Institutes enroll new students for the second year. An academic exchange program is established with Hanyang University.
- February 1995 An academic exchange program is established with Postech.
- May 1995 An academic exchange program is established with Liberty University and InJe University.
- July 1995 59 students of the two-year college and 77 trainees of the training institute graduate.
- September 1995 The Korean Language Department (three-year college) is established. Tennis and basketball courts are constructed beside the athletic field. Second dormitory construction starts.
- November 1995 An academic exchange program is established with CUST.
- December 1995 The Yanbian Information and Culture Public Relations, belonging to Continuing Education, is founded.

=== 2021 ===
- July 2021 Due to the expiration of its contract with the Chinese government, the university has halted its operations.

== School ==
The university operates K-12 school for China and foreign students, Yanbian International Academy.

== See also ==
- Pyongyang University of Science and Technology
- Yust Pust Foundation
