= Helong =

County-level city in Jilin, China

Helong 和龙市 · 화룡시
- County-level city
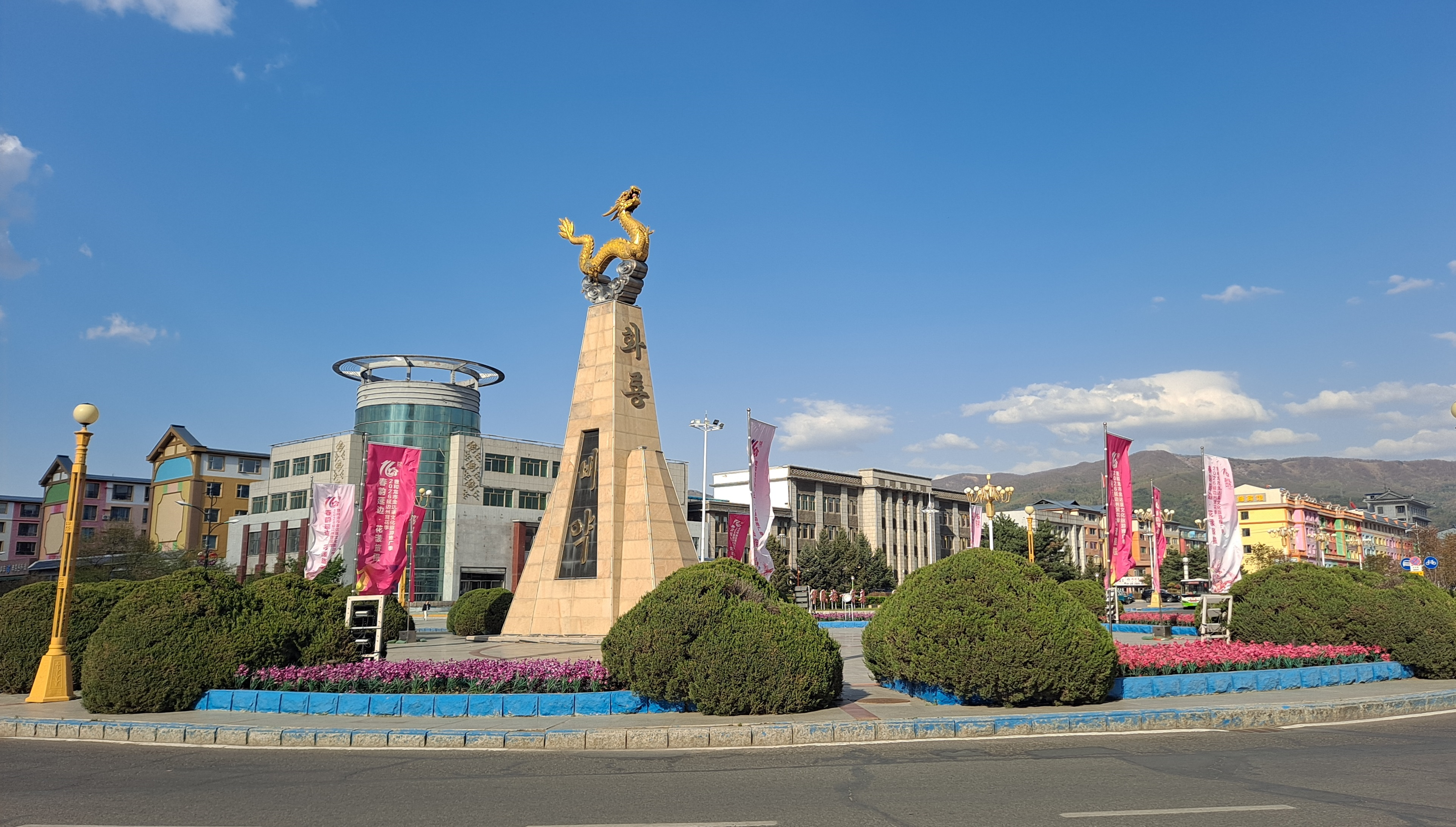

- Location in Jilin province
- Coordinates: 42°32′37″N 129°00′10″E
- Country: People's Republic of China
- Province: Jilin
- Prefecture: Yanbian
- Seat: Wenhua Subdistrict

Area
  - County-level city: 5,069.0 km^{2} (1,957.2 sq mi)
  - Urban: 145.00 km^{2} (55.98 sq mi)
- Elevation: 451 m (1,480 ft)

Population (2017)
  - County-level city: 181,000
  - Density: 35.7/km^{2} (92.5/sq mi)
  - Urban: 95,399
- Time zone: UTC+8 (China Standard)
- Postal code: 133500
- Website: http://www.helong.gov.cn/

Helong
- Simplified Chinese: 和龙市
- Traditional Chinese: 和龍市
Transcriptions
Standard Mandarin
- Hanyu Pinyin: Hélóng Shì

Chinese Korean name
- Chosŏn'gŭl: 화룡시
- Hancha: 和龍市
Transcriptions
- Revised Romanization: Hwaryong-si
- McCune–Reischauer: Hwaryong-si

South Korean name
- Hangul: 허룽시
- Hanja: 허룽市
Transcriptions
- Revised Romanization: Heorung Si
- McCune–Reischauer: Hŏrung Si

Helong (simplified Chinese: 和龙; traditional Chinese: 和龍; pinyin: Hélóng; Chosŏn'gŭl: 화룡; Hangul: 허룽) is a county-level city in southeastern Jilin province, Northeast China. It is under the administration of the Yanbian Korean Autonomous Prefecture. In January 2024, several thousand North Korean migrant workers in the city initiated a series of protests over withheld payments.

== History ==
In 2014, seven people were killed in Longcheng, Helong by North Korean border guards who had crossed the border in search of money, with locals of the township reporting of North Korean soldiers of crossing the border to commit thefts and murders, especially during winter months when the Tumen River freezes over, allowing for easier access on foot. Later in 2015, three people were killed by North Korean border guards in the same area.

== Administrative divisions ==
Helong has three subdistricts and eight towns.

Subdistricts:

- Wenhua Subdistrict (文化街道 / 문화가도)
- Minhui Subdistrict (民惠街道 / 민혜가도)
- Guangming Subdistrict (光明街道 / 광명가도)

Towns:

- Toudao (头道镇 / 두도진)
- Bajiazi (八家子镇 / 팔가자진)
- Fudong (福洞镇 / 복동진)
- Xicheng (西城镇 / 서성진)
- Nanping (南坪镇 / 남평진)
- Longcheng (龙城镇 / 용성진)
- Dongcheng (东城镇 / 동성진)
- Chongshan (崇善镇 / 숭선진)

== Climate ==
Climate data for Helong, elevation 476 m (1,562 ft), (1991–2020 normals, extremes 1981–present)
Month	Jan	Feb	Mar	Apr	May	Jun	Jul	Aug	Sep	Oct	Nov	Dec	Year
Record high °C (°F)	10.7 (51.3)	17.0 (62.6)	22.3 (72.1)	31.4 (88.5)	32.7 (90.9)	35.7 (96.3)	36.2 (97.2)	35.9 (96.6)	32.6 (90.7)	29.5 (85.1)	23.4 (74.1)	14.0 (57.2)	36.2 (97.2)
Mean daily maximum °C (°F)	−5.9 (21.4)	−1.8 (28.8)	5.0 (41.0)	14.2 (57.6)	20.6 (69.1)	24.1 (75.4)	26.6 (79.9)	26.1 (79.0)	21.6 (70.9)	14.5 (58.1)	4.0 (39.2)	−3.9 (25.0)	12.1 (53.8)
Daily mean °C (°F)	−12.4 (9.7)	−8.3 (17.1)	−1.2 (29.8)	7.2 (45.0)	13.6 (56.5)	18.0 (64.4)	21.1 (70.0)	20.4 (68.7)	14.4 (57.9)	7.1 (44.8)	−2.0 (28.4)	−9.9 (14.2)	5.7 (42.2)
Mean daily minimum °C (°F)	−17.7 (0.1)	−14.1 (6.6)	−7.0 (19.4)	0.7 (33.3)	7.3 (45.1)	12.6 (54.7)	16.5 (61.7)	15.8 (60.4)	8.4 (47.1)	0.8 (33.4)	−7.2 (19.0)	−15 (5)	0.1 (32.2)
Record low °C (°F)	−31.5 (−24.7)	−27.4 (−17.3)	−23.5 (−10.3)	−10.6 (12.9)	−3.7 (25.3)	4.2 (39.6)	7.2 (45.0)	5.1 (41.2)	−3.4 (25.9)	−12.4 (9.7)	−22.9 (−9.2)	−28.5 (−19.3)	−31.5 (−24.7)
Average precipitation mm (inches)	3.8 (0.15)	7.5 (0.30)	12.0 (0.47)	24.2 (0.95)	66.7 (2.63)	84.9 (3.34)	128.3 (5.05)	126.0 (4.96)	58.7 (2.31)	22.6 (0.89)	17.4 (0.69)	6.6 (0.26)	558.7 (22)
Average precipitation days (≥ 0.1 mm)	3.2	4.0	6.5	8.5	14.6	15.5	15.8	15.3	9.6	6.2	6.2	4.4	109.8
Average snowy days	6.6	6.9	9.1	4.4	0.2	0	0	0	0	2	7.8	7.8	44.8
Average relative humidity (%)	55	50	48	48	58	71	79	81	74	58	56	55	61
Mean monthly sunshine hours	175.4	182.8	214.2	203.1	210.0	191.1	180.3	191.2	206.3	201.2	159.7	153.4	2,268.7
Percentage possible sunshine	60	61	58	51	46	42	39	45	56	59	55	55	52
Source: China Meteorological Administrationall-time February high
