= Yanbian Korean Autonomous Prefecture =

Yanbian Korean Autonomous Prefecture 延边州/연변주
- Autonomous prefecture

Chinese transcription(s)
  - Simplified Chinese: 延边朝鲜族自治州
  - Hanyu Pinyin: Yánbiān Cháoxiǎnzú Zìzhìzhōu

Korean transcription(s)
  - Chosŏn'gŭl: 연변조선족자치주
  - McCune–Reischauer: Yŏnbyŏn Chosŏnjok Chach'iju
  - Revised Romanization: Yeonbyeon Joseonjok Jachiju
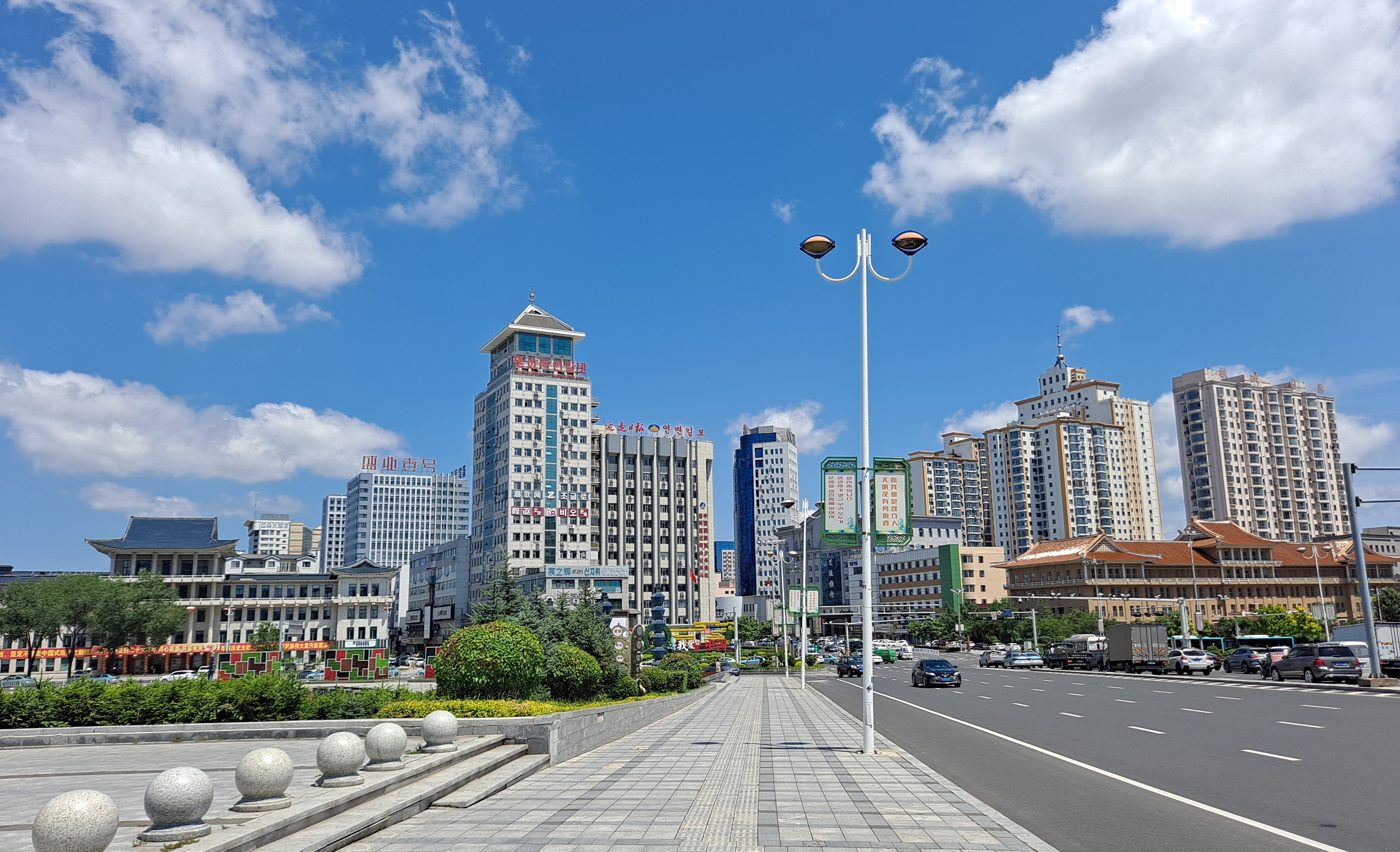
- Yanji, the prefectural seat of Yanbian

- Location of Yanbian Prefecture (red) in Jilin Province (orange) and Mainland China (yellow)
- Coordinates: 43°08′N 129°11′E
- Country: China
- Province: Jilin
- County-level divisions: 6 county-level cities 2 counties
- Prefectural seat: Yanji

Government
  - CCP Secretary: Hua Jiafu
  - Congress Chairman: Zhang Taifan
  - Governor: Hong Gyeong
  - Prefectural CPPCC Chairwoman: Kang Fang

Area
  - Total: 43,329.3 km^{2} (16,729.5 sq mi)

Population (2022)
  - Total: 2,015,500
  - Density: 46.516/km^{2} (120.48/sq mi)

Demographics
  - Ethnic composition: 65.79% Han; 30.77% Korean; 3.44% other
  - Languages: Korean, Mandarin Chinese

GDP
  - Total: CN¥ 100 billion yuan US$ 14.49 billion
  - Per capita: CN¥40,119; US$6,441
- Time zone: UTC+8 (China Standard)
- Postal code: 133000
- Area code: +86 433
- ISO 3166 code: CN-JL-24
- Licence plate prefixes: 吉H
- Website: www.yanbian.gov.cn

Yanbian Korean Autonomous Prefecture
- "Yanbian" written in Simplified Chinese and Chosŏn'gŭl
- Simplified Chinese: 延边朝鲜族自治州
- Traditional Chinese: 延邊朝鮮族自治州
Transcriptions
Standard Mandarin
- Hanyu Pinyin: Yánbiān Cháoxiǎnzú Zìzhìzhōu
Yue: Cantonese
- Jyutping: Jin^{4}bin^{1} Ziu^{4}sin^{1}zuk^{6} Zi^{6}zi^{6}zau^{1}

Chinese Korean name
- Chosŏn'gŭl: 연변조선족자치주
- Hancha: 延邊朝鮮族自治州
Transcriptions
- Revised Romanization: Yeonbyeon Joseonjok Jachiju
- McCune–Reischauer: Yŏnbyŏn Chosŏnjok Chach'iju

South Korean name
- Hangul: 옌볜조선족자치주
- Hanja: 옌볜朝鮮族自治州
Transcriptions
- Revised Romanization: Yenbyen Joseonjok Jachiju
- McCune–Reischauer: Yenbyen Chosŏnjok Chach'iju

Yanbian Korean Autonomous Prefecture (Note: Chinese: 延边朝鲜族自治州; pinyin: Yánbiān Cháoxiǎnzú Zìzhìzhōu; Korean: 연변조선족자치주; RR: Yeonbyeon Joseonjok Jachiju; MR: Yŏnbyŏn Chosŏnjok Chach'iju) is an autonomous prefecture of eastern Jilin province in Northeast China, bordered to the north by Heilongjiang province, to the west by Jilin's Baishan and Jilin City, to the south by North Korea's North Hamgyong Province, and to the east by Russia's Primorsky Krai. Yanbian is known as the region with the largest number of ethnic Koreans (Chaoxianzu) living in China. It is sometimes referred to as the "Third Korea".

The prefectural capital is Yanji and the total area is 42,700 square kilometres (16,500 sq mi). The prefecture has an important Balhae archaeological site – the Ancient Tombs at Longtou Mountain – which includes the Mausoleum of Princess Jeonghyo.

== History ==
In the Ming dynasty, Yanbian was governed by the Jianzhou Guard (建州衛) and in the late Qing dynasty the area was divided into the Yanji (延吉廳) and Hunchun (琿春廳) subprefectures. From 1644 to 1800s, the Manchurian Qing state maintained a policy of disallowing Han Chinese immigration into traditionally Manchurian lands in order to ensure that the Manchu were not assimilated by the Han Chinese. However, this effort failed because of the trading and agricultural opportunities available to Han Chinese migrants in the northeast region which made it profitable to evade the rules, as well as later Qing relaxation of the same rules (Chuang Guandong) to discourage Russian encroachment. Thus, in the 19th century, Chinese immigrants migrated en masse from China proper to areas that were formerly off limits to Han Chinese migration.

In the late 19th century, Korean immigrants migrated en masse from the Korean Peninsula to China. Korean (Joseon) migration into Northeast China began in significant numbers in the last quarter of the 19th century and was mainly motivated by economic hardship on the Korean side of the border. After the Japanese annexed Korea in 1910, a small but significant number of migrants also came to Manchuria for political reasons.

After the foundation of the Republic of China, a second wave arrived. Of the 2 million ethnic Koreans in Manchuria at the time of the communist takeover, 1.2 million remained in the region after the end of World War II. Many participated in the Chinese Civil War, most on the side of the Chinese communists.

On the 3rd of September 1952, the Yanbian Autonomous Region was established. This was the sixth of over 157 different administrative areas created in the 1950s for ethnic minorities in China. In December 1955, Yanbian was 'administratively downgraded' to an Autonomous Prefecture due to its 'insufficiently large' population. It now sits one level below the Jilin provincial government which, despite containing many ethnic-majority counties, is a regional not an ethnic province.

During the Cultural Revolution, ethnic Koreans were killed and persecuted in Yanbian. Many non-Han Chinese residents of Yanbian were suspected to be disloyal to the Chinese state, and subsequently beaten, killed, publicly humiliated, fired, exiled or imprisoned.

Many Yanbianese Koreans died in the Korean Civil War. Of the Yanbianese fatalities, 90% were ethnic Koreans.

In 1952, the Korean migrants composed some 60% of the local population, but by 2000 that was down to 32%. The Chinese authorities subsidize Korean language schools and publications, but also take measures to prevent an emergence of Korean irredentism in the area.

In July 1982, national census data indicates there were around 1.8 million ethnic Koreans in China, with over 755,000 residing in Yanbian. The provincial capital, Yanji, was around 56% Korean, with the highest concentration situated in Longjing County, at a 65.1% majority. Overall, the area of Yanbian was reported to be 40.3% ethnically Korean.

From the late 1990s, the Chaoxianzu have assimilated into mainstream Chinese culture with increasing speed, often switching to daily use of Chinese and choosing to attend Chinese-language schools.

== Geography ==
- Geographic coordinates: 41° 59' 47" – 44° 30' 42" N, 127° 27' 43" – 131° 18' 33" E
- Total border length: 755.2 kilometres (469.3 mi)
  - With North Korea: 522.5 kilometres (324.7 mi)
  - With Russia: 232.7 kilometres (144.6 mi)

Mountains that are in the prefecture are:

- Changbai Mountains (central range)
- Zhangguangcai Range
- Harba Peak (哈尔巴岭)
- Peony Peak (牡丹领)
- Old Master Peak (老爷岭)
- Nangang Mountain Range (南岗山脉)

There have been over 40 types of minerals and 50 kinds of metals – including gold, lead, zinc, copper, silver, manganese and mercury – discovered near or in the mountains.

The average land height is 500 metres above sea level.

Main rivers include:

- Songhua River
- Mudan River (Peony River)
- Tumen River
  - Gaya River (branch of the Tumen)
  - Hunchun River

The rivers sustain 28 running water processing facilities. They created basins, which are suitable for agricultural uses, like rice paddies and bean farms.

== Politics ==
=== Structure ===
Title	CCP Committee Secretary	People's Congress Chairman	Governor	Yanbian CPPCC Chairwoman
Name	Hua Jiafu	Zhang Taifan	Hong Gyeong	Kang Fang
Ethnicity	Han	Korean	Korean	Han
Born	October 1967 (age 59)	November 1964 (age 61–62)	November 1976 (age 49–50)	March 1966 (age 60)
Assumed office	June 2022	January 2022	November 2021	January 2022

=== Administrative divisions ===
The prefecture is subdivided into eight county-level divisions: six county-level cities and two counties:

Administrative divisions of the Yanbian Korean Autonomous Prefecture
Division code	Division	Area (km^{2})	Total population 2020	Seat	Postal code
222400	Yanbian Korean Autonomous Prefecture	43,329.34	1,941,700	Yanji	133000
222401	Yanji City	1,722.24	686,136	Xinxing Subdistrict	133000
222402	Tumen City	1,140.50	85,248	Xiangshang Subdistrict	133100
222403	Dunhua City	11,787.76	392,486	Minzhu Subdistrict	133700
222404	Hunchun City	5,141.29	239,359	Henan Subdistrict	133300
222405	Longjing City	2,208.80	129,286	Anmin Subdistrict	133400
222406	Helong City	5,068.71	117,087	Wenhua Subdistrict	133500
222424	Wangqing County	8,825.81	167,911	Dachuan Subdistrict	133200
222426	Antu County	7,434.23	124,187	Jiulong Subdistrict	133600

Divisions in Chinese and Korean
English	Chinese	Pinyin	Chinese Korean transliteration		
English	Chinese	Pinyin	Joseongeul	Revised	McCune
Yanbian Korean Autonomous Prefecture	延边朝鲜族自治州	Yánbiān Cháoxiǎnzú Zìzhìzhōu	연변조선족자치주	Yeonbyeon Joseonjok Jachiju	Yŏnbyŏn Chosŏnjok Chach'iju
Yanji City	延吉市	Yánjí Shì	연길시	Yeongil-si	Yŏngil-si
Tumen City	图们市	Túmén Shì	도문시	Domun-si	Tomun-si
Dunhua City	敦化市	Dūnhuà Shì	돈화시	Donhwa-si	Tonhwa-si
Hunchun City	珲春市	Húnchūn Shì	혼춘시	Hunchun-si	Hunch’un-si
Longjing City	龙井市	Lóngjǐng Shì	룡정시	Ryongjeong-si	Ryongjŏng-si
Helong City	和龙市	Hélóng Shì	화룡시	Hwaryong-si	Hwaryong-si
Wangqing County	汪清县	Wāngqīng Xiàn	왕청현	Wangcheong-hyeon	Wangch’ŏng-hyŏn
Antu County	安图县	Āntú Xiàn	안도현	Ando-hyeon	Ando-hyŏn

The above counties and cities are divided into 642 villages (边境村).

== Transportation ==
Railways include:

- Chang-Tu Line (长图线)
- Mu-Tu Line (牡图线)
- Chao-Kai Line (朝开线)
- Yangchuan-Shantun Line (阳川山屯线)
- Jilin–Hunchun intercity railway (吉珲客运专线)

There are 1,480 km (920 mi) of public roads altogether. There are four airports.

== Demographics ==
The total registered population in Yanbian at the end of 2022 was 2.015 million. The urbanization rate was 69.6% in 2022. Between 1952 and 2002, Yanbian had among the highest rates of urbanization at 55.6%, 20 percentage points greater than the provincial average (31.3%) and 25 more than the national average (26.5%).

As of 2005, the overall sex ratio among Yanbian Koreans is relatively balanced at 99.1, going against the trend of sex-ratio imbalance across China, but significant differences emerge between urban and rural areas. Urban centers like Yanji show a lower sex ratio of 95.3, indicating more women than men, while rural counties have a higher ratio of 105.7, reflecting more men.

=== Ethnic composition ===
In 1881, numbers of ethnic Koreans in Yanbian were less than 10,000. By 1910, this number had increased 10-fold.

In July 1982, national census data indicated that 1.8 million ethnic Koreans lived in China overall, with 755,000 in Yanbian alone. The proportion of ethnic Koreans in Yanbian Prefecture was reported as:

Population in Yanbian, 1982
	Population	Koreans (%)
Yanji City	175,957	56.9
Tumen City	93,197	58.9
Longjing City	314,672	65.1
Helong County	241,600	60.3
Hunchun County	146,672	56.6
Wangqing County	264,475	34.0
Antu County	185,901	28.1
Dunhua County	449,030	5.3
Total	1,871,504	40.3

As of 2022, the population of Yanbian was predominantly Han, who were estimated to make up 60.2%, followed by Koreans at 35.5%, and Manchus at 3.6%. The ethnic composition according to the 2020 census:

Demographic Profile of the Yanbian Korean Autonomous Prefecture
Ethnicity	Han	Korean	Manchu	Hui	Mongol	Miao	Tujia	Zhuang	Jingpo	Yi	Other
Population	1,222,373	597,426	54,292	5,530	4,532	349	248	219	214	168	1,350
%	65.79	30.77	2.80	0.28	0.23	0.02	0.01	0.01	0.01	0.01	0.07
% of ethnic minorities	–	89.93	8.17	0.83	0.68	0.05	0.04	0.03	0.03	0.03	0.20

As on the Korean peninsula, the most common surname among Yanbian Koreans is Kim (Jin [金] in Chinese).

== Economy ==
The GDP of Yanbian was about CN¥83.857 billion (US$12.479 billion) as of 2022. Its per capita for 2022 was CN¥44,007 (US$6,542). Its primary, secondary, and tertiary industries were worth CN¥7.652 billion (US$1.138 billion), CN¥33.527 billion (US$4.9285 billion), and CN¥42.708 billion (US$6.350 billion), respectively.

Since the 1990s, Yanbian's economy has transformed due to China's market reforms and stronger ties with South Korea. After China normalized diplomatic relations with the South in 1992, Yanbian was exposed to South Korean investment, media, and consumer culture like never before. Many Joseonjok migrated to South Korea for work — a trend known as Hanggukbaram (Korean: 한국바람; lit. 'Korean dream or Korean wind'). By 2011, money that Joseonjok migrants sent back home to Yanbian in the form of remittances reached $1 billion USD annually, making up one-third of Yanbian's GDP. The economy also shifted from farming and industry to services and tourism, making Yanbian one of the wealthiest minority regions in China.

== Education ==
During the Japanese occupation of Manchuria and Korea, education for ethnic Koreans in Yanbian was tightly linked to anti-Japanese resistance movements. As such, the Japanese government sought to exert their own influence over Korean learners. In Yanbian specifically, by 1928 Japanese authorities managed to enroll around 6,056 students across 38 schools, while Korean-run Christian, religious, and private schools enrolled a comparable number – 5,386 students – across 137 schools. In the 1930s, the Japanese government was able to impose further crack-downs on Korean-run institutions, banning the use of the Korean language in education.

Following the collapse of the Japanese empire, local Koreans in Yanbian had to rebuild Japanese schools, which were shut down or abandoned. In fact, in the years after the Japanese occupation fell, more pupils were enrolled in education in Yanbian than before. The number of primary schools had risen from 557 in 1944 to 647 in 1949, and student enrollment grew from 96,800 to 129,800 in the same period. Middle schools increased from 18 to 31, while the number of enrolled students nearly doubled from 6,700 to 13,797.

In the late 1970s, there was a rapid expansion in the number of Korean schools in Yanbian. 96 new primary schools and 27 new middle schools were opened between 1976 and 1982.

However, since the start of the 21st century, enrollment in Korean schools in Yanbian has been declining. Attendees of Korean-language schools have significantly lower fluency rates in Mandarin Chinese, which inhibits socioeconomic mobility and cultural integration into wider Chinese society. Between 1996 and 2000, the number of Korean elementary schools in Yanbian fell from 256 to 183, and student enrollment was cut in half. Equally, attendance of Joseonjok at Han schools in Yanbian more than doubled between 1987 and 2000.

As of 2017, 303 in every 10,000 people in Yanbian hold university degrees, which is 2.13 times the national average.

Colleges and universities:

- Yanbian University, which uses both Chinese and Korean as instruction mediums.
- Yanbian University of Science and Technology

International schools:

- Yanbian International Academy
- Korean International School in Yanbian

== Culture ==
The Yanbian Museum was planned in 1960, and constructed in 1982. It contains over 10,000 exhibits, including 11 first-level artifacts. The exhibits' labels and explanations are bilingual in Korean and Chinese and tour guides are also available in both languages.

== Tourism ==
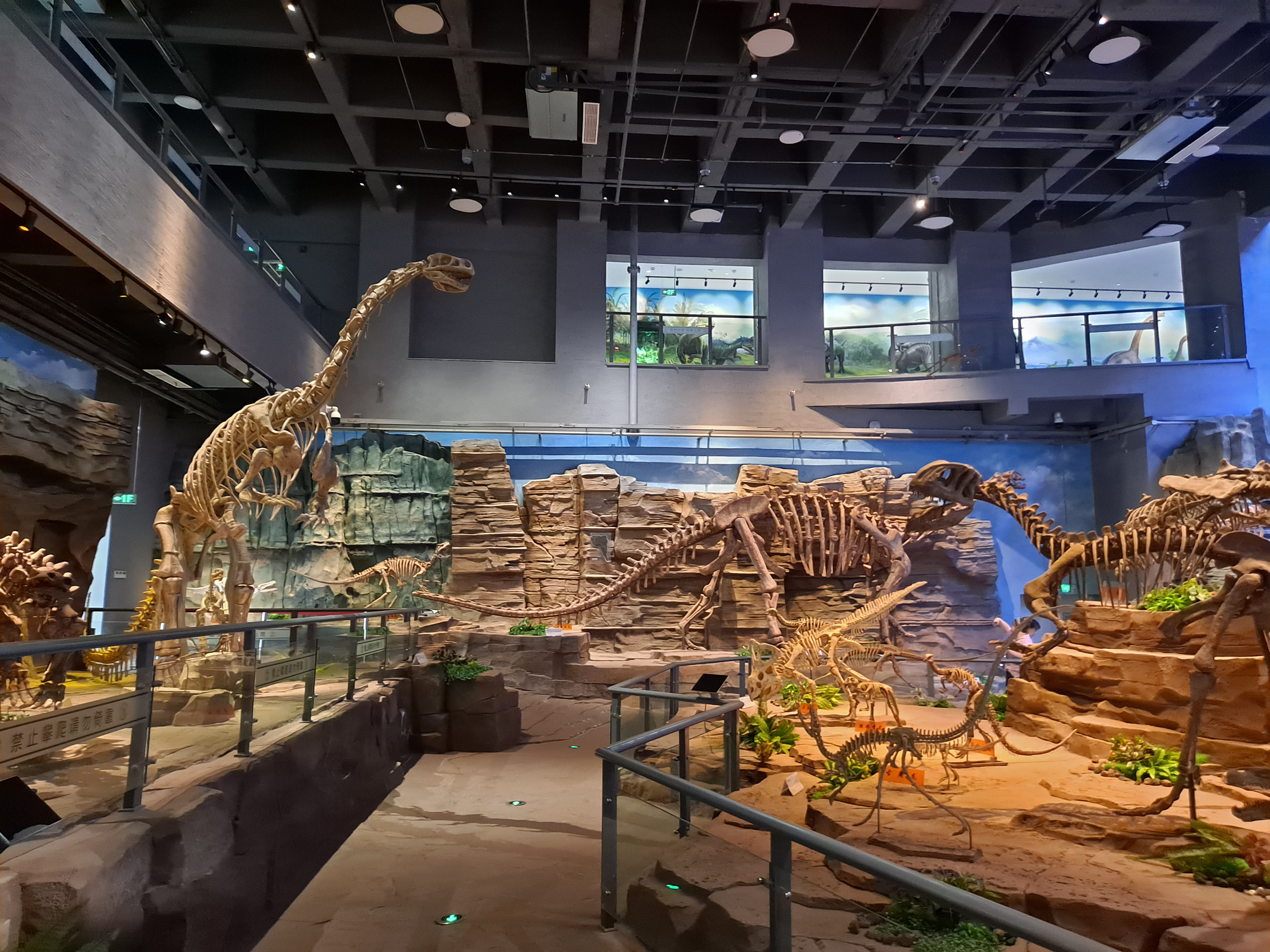
Yanji Dinosaur Museum

There are seven public parks in Yanbian's green space (18% of whole prefecture), including:

- Yanji People's Park (延吉人民公园)
- Youth Lake Park (青年湖公园)

Also popular among locals during holidays and festivities.

- Changbaeksan

== Nature and environment ==
Over 70% of the prefecture is forest, so there is a rich biodiversity.

- 1,460 species of native animals
- 250 species of native plants.

== Sports ==
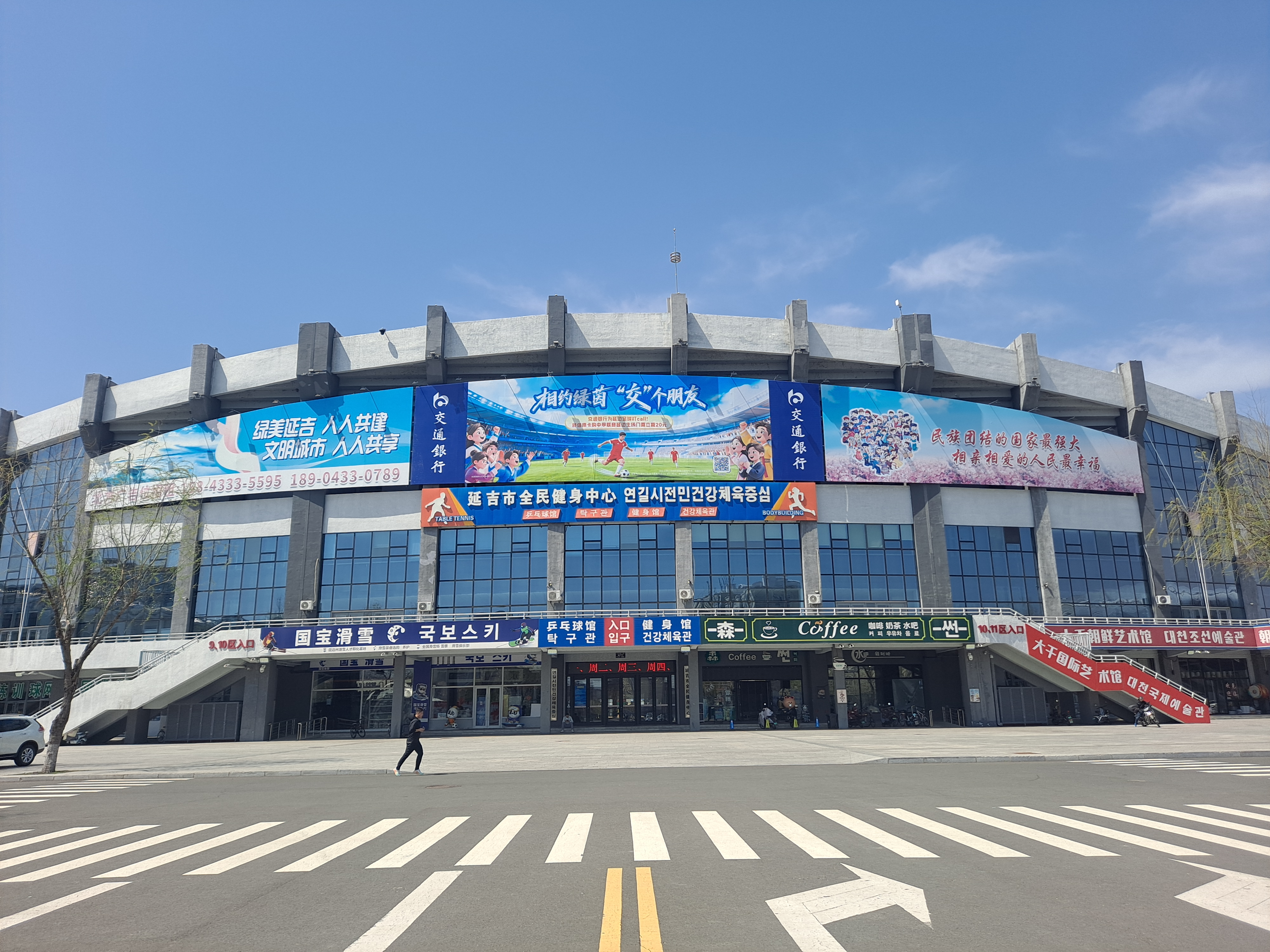
Yanji Stadium

Yanbian Korean Autonomous Prefecture is an important region for Chinese football. Over 50 years, more than 40 footballers have been selected by the China national team.

The first professional football team in this prefecture is Jilin Three Stars Football Club. From 1994 to 2000, this club had played each year in the top Chinese football league. In 2000, they were relegated from the top league. Because of poor economic conditions the club was sold to Lucheng Group in Zhejiang Province.

Yanbian Longding plays in the 30,000-seater Yanji Stadium in China League One, the second tier of the Chinese football league system.

In 2016, Yanbian Football Club was sponsored by Shenzhen Funde Group (Chinese: 富德集团) when they got the permission of Chinese Super League, since they acquired the 1st place in the Chinese Second League in 2015.

== See also ==
- Changbai Korean Autonomous County
- Koreans in China
