= Jilin–Hunchun intercity railway =

Railway line in China

Jilin–Hunchun intercity railway 吉珲客运专线

Overview
- Status: Operational
- Locale: Jilin City and Yanbian Korean Autonomous Prefecture; Jilin
- Termini: Jilin City; Hunchun
- Stations: 9

Service
- Type: High-speed rail
- Operator: China Railway High-speed

History
- Opened: September 30, 2015

Technical
- Line length: 359 km (223 mi)
- Track gauge: 1,435 mm (4 ft 8 1/2 in) standard gauge
- Minimum radius: 4,000 to 3,500 m (13,123 to 11,483 ft)
- Electrification: 50 Hz 25,000 V
- Operating speed: 250 km/h (155 mph)

Jilin–Hunchun intercity railway
- Simplified Chinese: 吉珲客运专线
- Traditional Chinese: 吉琿客運專線
Transcriptions
Standard Mandarin
- Hanyu Pinyin: Jí Huī Kèyùn Zhuānxiàn

Jilin–Hunchun intercity railway, also known as Jihun Passenger Dedicated Line, is a high-speed railway operated by China Railway High-speed in Jilin Province. It connects the major city of Jilin City with the eastern city of Hunchun near the border with Russia and North Korea. It will have a total length of 359 km (223 mi) of electrified double-track railways, built to the Grade 1 standard. Project construction started on October 30, 2010, with operations commencing on September 20, 2015. The railway has been described as "Dongbei's most beautiful railway" (due to the terrain it runs through) and "the fastest way to Vladivostok" (4 hours by train from Shenyang to Hunchun, plus 4 hours by bus from Hunchun to Vladivostok). Reflecting the border location of the city, the new train station has its sign in four languages: Chinese, Korean, Russian, and English. Future prospects could see the line extended to Vladivostok.

== History ==
- July 26, 2010: the project is eligible for the National Development and Reform Commission approval.
- October 30, 2010: the project officially started.
- September 20, 2015: officially opened.

== Route ==
Line starting from Jilin City, the railway runs eastward towards Jiaohe. Crossing into Yanbian Korean Autonomous Prefecture the railway moves through Dunhua, Antu County, Yanji, Tumen and finally ending in Hunchun. The railway length is 359 km (223 mi), with a total investment of about 41.6 billion yuan. There are 106 bridges along the route with a total length of 87 km (54 mi), 86 tunnels account for a total length of 149 km (93 mi). Thus combined, bridges and tunnels cover more than 66% of the total route.

At Jilin, the line connects with the Changchun–Jilin intercity railway. Many services run between Hunchun and Changchun.

== Stations ==
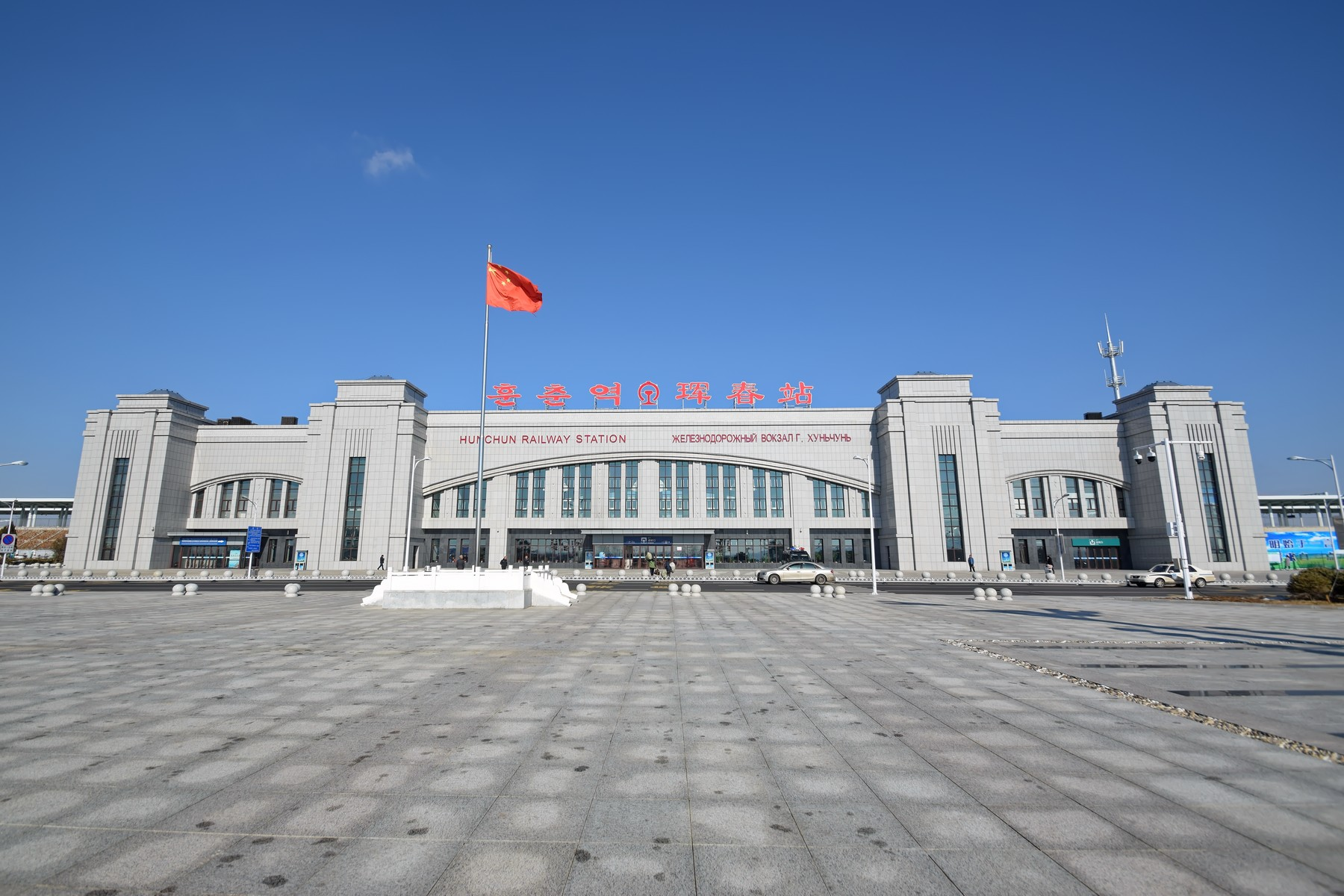
Hunchun Railway Station, with signage in Chinese, Korean, Russian, and English

Nine stations are located along the route.

- Jilin
- Jiaohe West
- Weihuling North
- Dunhua (interchange with the Dunhua–Baihe high-speed railway, under construction)
- Dashitou South
- Antu West
- Yanji West
- Tumen North
- Hunchun
