= Shenyang–Baihe high-speed railway =

High-speed rail line in China

Shenyang–Baihe high-speed railway 沈白高速铁路

Overview
- Status: Open

Service
- Operator(s): China Railway Shenyang Group

Technical
- Line length: 428.8 km (266 mi)
- Track gauge: 1,435 mm (4 ft 8 1/2 in)
- Operating speed: 350 km/h (217 mph)

The Shenyang–Baihe high-speed railway is a high-speed railway in China. The railway runs from Shenyang North station in Shenyang to Changbaishan station in Erdao Baihe, Antu County, Yanbian. It is 428 kilometres (266 mi) long and will have a design speed of 350 kilometres per hour (220 mph). The railway was expected to open in 2025. Eventually, the whole railway opened on 28 September 2025.

== History ==
Preliminary research into the project began in September 2015. Construction started in October 2020.

== Stations ==
Station Name	Chinese	China Railway transfers/connections
Shenyang North	沈阳北	
Boguan	伯官	
Fushun	抚顺	
Donghanjia	东韩家	
Xinbin	新宾	
Tonghua	通化	
Baishan East	白山东	
Jiangyuan East	江源东	
Changbaishan West	长白山西	Jingyu–Songjianghe railway Hunjiang–Baihe railway
Changbaishan	长白山	Dunhua–Baihe high-speed railway
