= Baihe railway station =

Railway station in Erdaobaihe, People's Republic of China

Baihe 白河
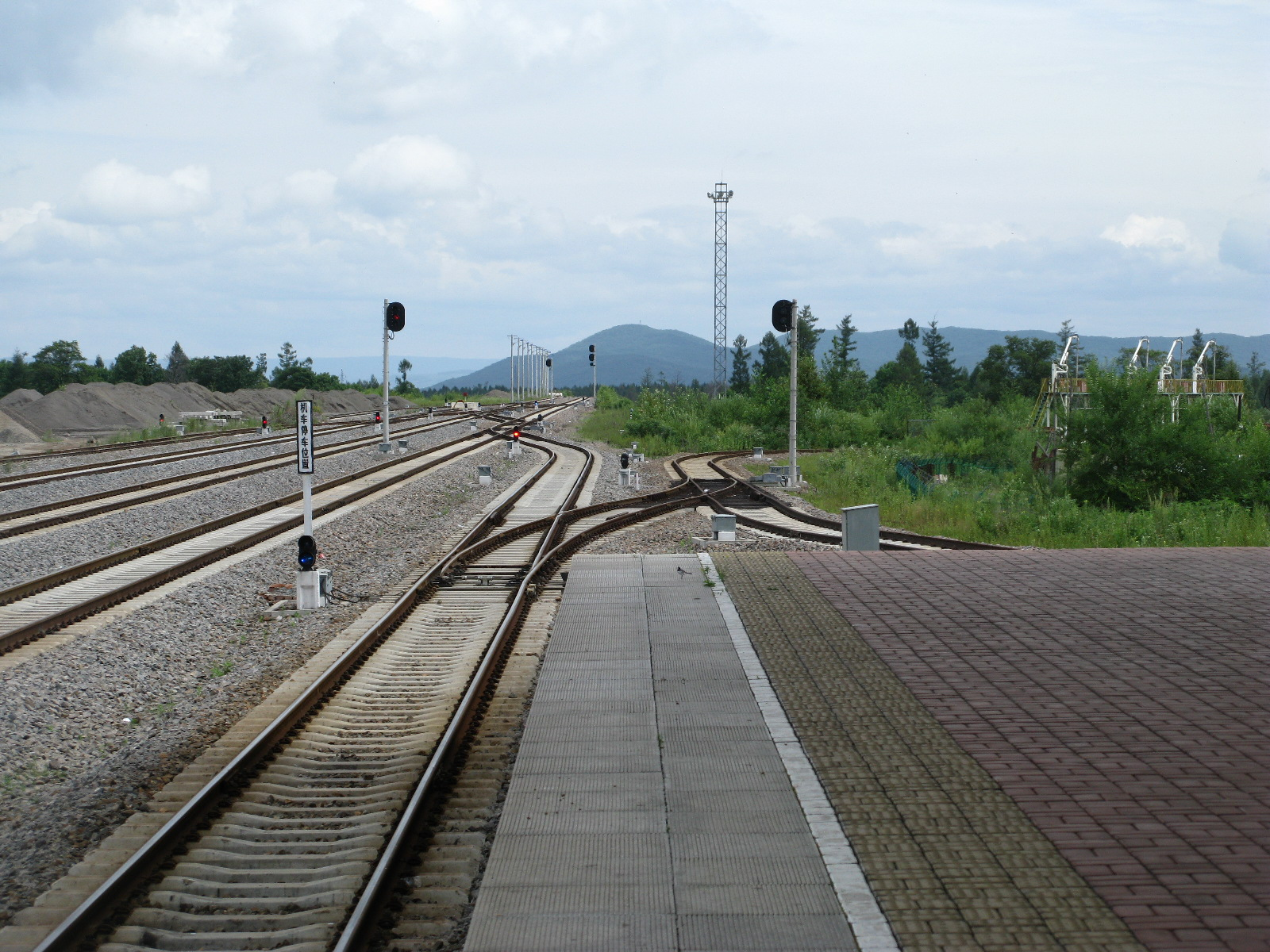

General information
- Location: Erdaobaihe, Antu County, Yanbian, Jilin; China
- Coordinates: 42°27′00″N 128°07′30″E
- Operator: CR Shenyang
- Lines: Baihe Railway; Hunbai Railway; Jiaozuo–Liuzhou railway

Other information
- Station code: 64790 (TMIS code); BEL (telegraph code); BHE (Pinyin code)
- Classification: Class 3 station (三等站)

History
- Opened: 1973
- Closed: 2021
Location
- Location within Jilin Location within China

Baihe railway station (Chinese: 白河站) is a station on the Baihe Railway and Hunbai Railway in Erdaobaihe, Antu County, Yanbian, Jilin, China.

The station was closed for passengers as passenger services moved to the nearby Changbaishan railway station which opened on the Dunhua-Baihe railway in 2021.
