= Dunhua (disambiguation) =

Dunhua is a county-level city of the Yanbian Korean Autonomous Prefecture in Jilin province, People's Republic of China.

Dunhua may also refer to:

- Dunhua railway station, a railway station in Dunhua, Yanbian, Jilin
- Dunhua Road, arterial in Taipei, Taiwan
