= Dashitou railway station =

Railway station in Dunhua, China

Coordinates: 43.3029°N 128.4950°E

Dashitou railway station is a fourth-class railway station in Dashitou, Dunhua, Yanbian, Jilin, China on the Changchun–Tumen railway. It was opened in 1932.

== See also ==
- Dashitou South railway station
