= Dashitou South railway station =

Railway station in Dunhua, China

Coordinates: 43.2982°N 128.4508°E

Platform 1

Dashitounan railway station is a railway station in Dashitou, Dunhua, Yanbian, Jilin, China on the Jilin–Hunchun intercity railway. Although the line opened in 2015, Dashitou South railway station did not open until 10 April 2018.

== See also ==
- Dashitou railway station

Preceding station	China Railway High-speed	Following station
Dunhua towards Jilin	Jilin–Hunchun intercity railway	Antu West towards Hunchun
