= Dunhua railway station =

Railway station in Dunhua, China

Coordinates: 43.3775°N 128.2395°E

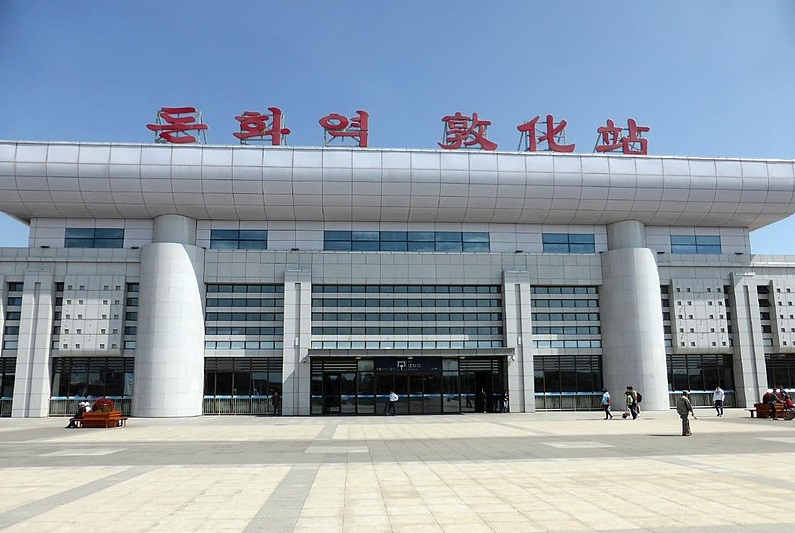

Dunhua railway station is a second-class railway station in Dunhua, Yanbian, Jilin. It was built in 1928.

It is on the Changchun–Tumen railway, Jilin–Hunchun intercity railway, and the Dunhua–Baihe high-speed railway, which is currently under construction.

Preceding station	China Railway High-speed	Following station
Jiaohe West towards Jilin	Jilin–Hunchun intercity railway	Dashitou South towards Hunchun
