= Daqiao Township, Jilin =

Daqiao Township 大桥乡
- Township
- Location in Jilin
- Coordinates: 43°20′42″N 128°22′14″E
- Country: People's Republic of China
- Province: Jilin
- Autonomous prefecture: Yanbian
- County-level city: Dunhua
- Village-level divisions: 15 villages
- Elevation: 533 m (1,749 ft)
- Time zone: UTC+8 (China Standard)
- Area code: 0433

Daqiao Township (simplified Chinese: 大桥乡; traditional Chinese: 大橋鄉; pinyin: Dàqiáo Xiāng; lit. 'great or large bridge') is a township under the administration of Dunhua City in southeastern Jilin province, China, located 11 kilometres (6.8 mi) east-southeast of downtown Dunhua. As of 2018, it has 15 villages under its administration.

== See also ==
- List of township-level divisions of Jilin
