= Changbaishan railway station =

Railway station in Yanbian, Jilin, China

Changbaishan 长白山
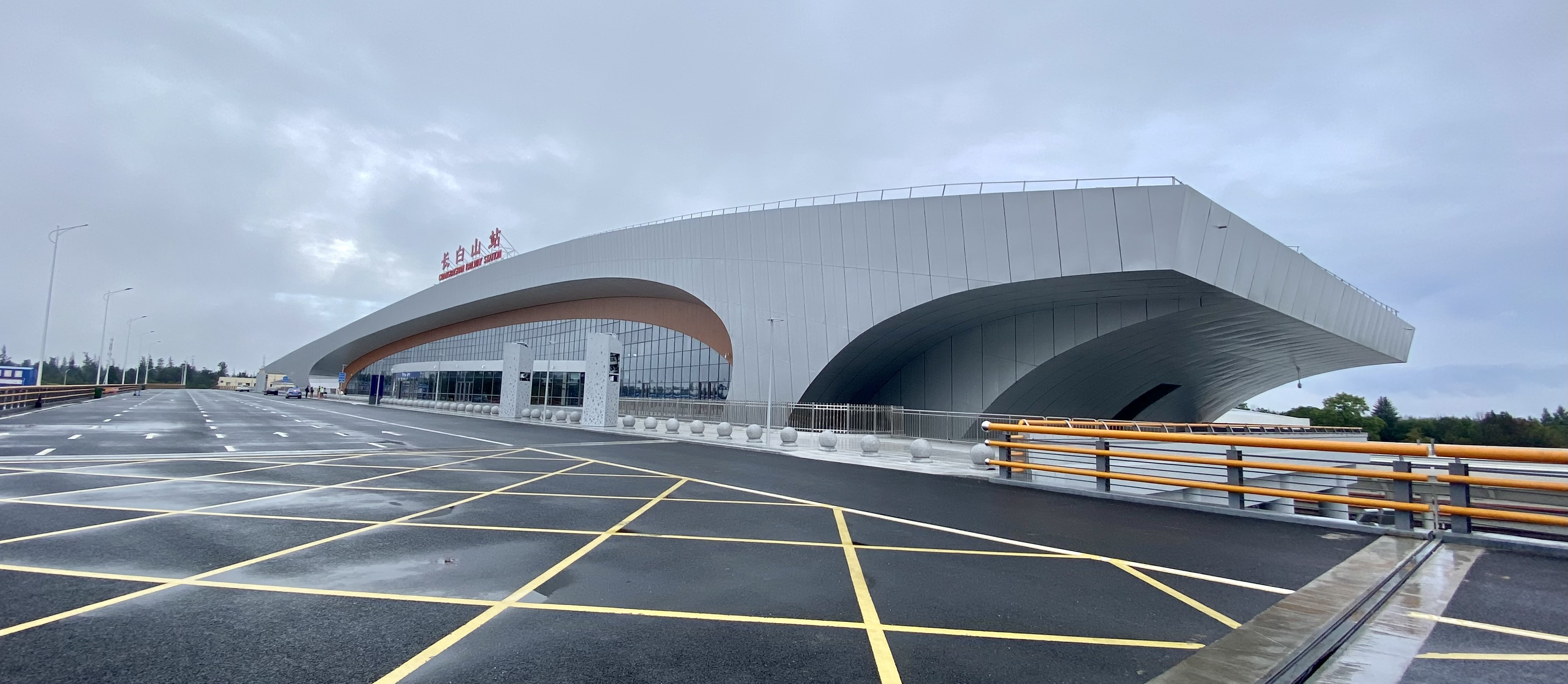

General information
- Location: Erdaobaihe, Antu County, Yanbian, Jilin; China
- Coordinates: 42.46009°N 128.12152°E
- Elevation: 900 m
- Operated by: CR Shenyang
- Line: Dunhua–Baihe high-speed railway
- Platforms: 5
- Tracks: 12

History
- Opened: December 24, 2021; 4 years ago
Location

The Changbaishan railway station is a station on the Dunhua–Baihe high-speed railway. It opened on 24 December 2021 and serves Erdaobaihe town and the Changbai Mountain Scenic Area. The station is located in a scenic forested area.
