= Yanji West railway station =

Railway station in Chaoyangchuan, China

Coordinates: 42.9017°N 129.4078°E

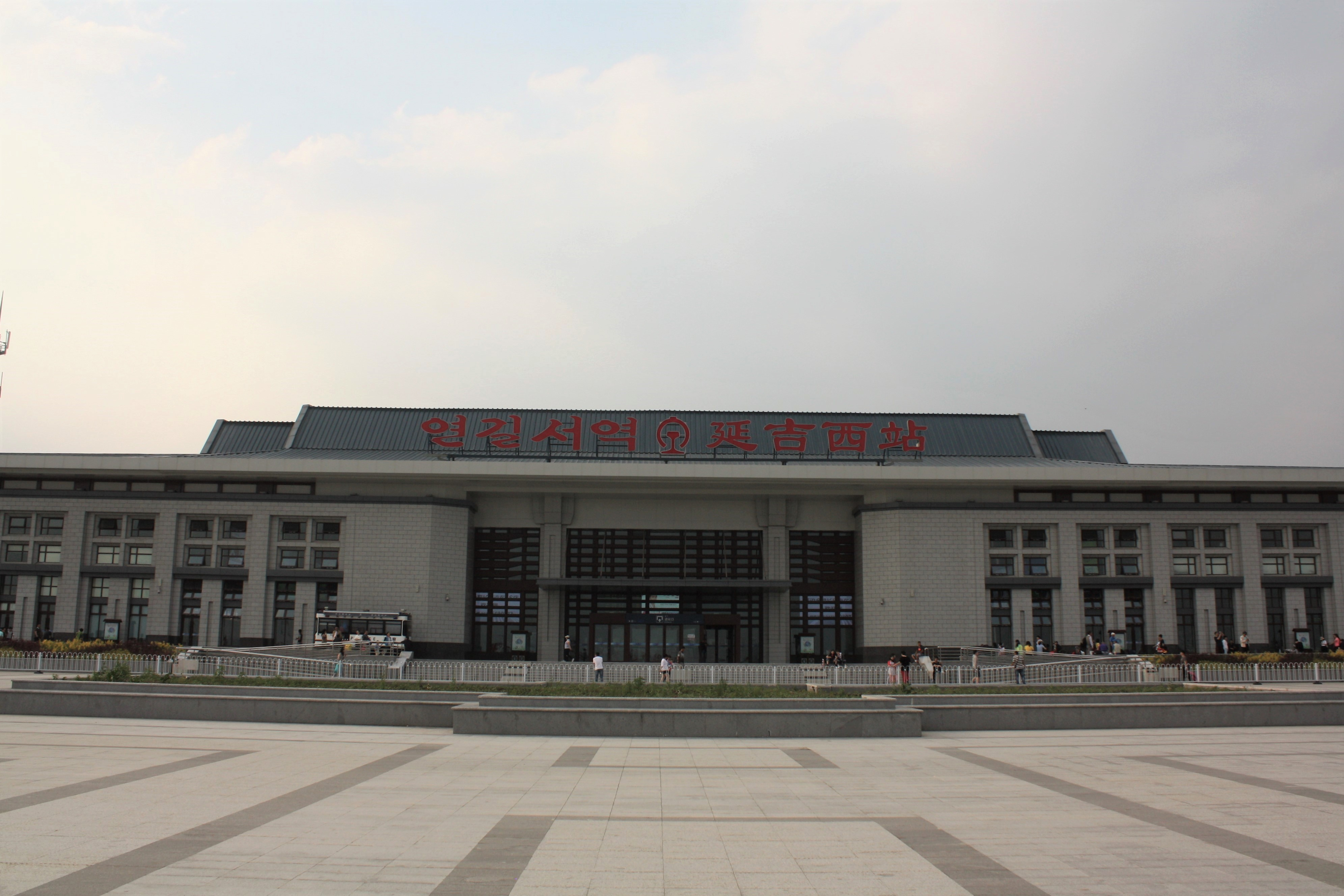
Yanji West railway station

Yanji West railway station is a railway station in Chaoyangchuan, Yanji, Yanbian, Jilin on the Changchun–Tumen railway.
