= Dashitou =

Human settlement in China

Dashitou: 大石头镇 (Chinese); 大石頭鎮 (Chinese); 대석두진 (Korean)
- Town

Dunhua transcription(s)
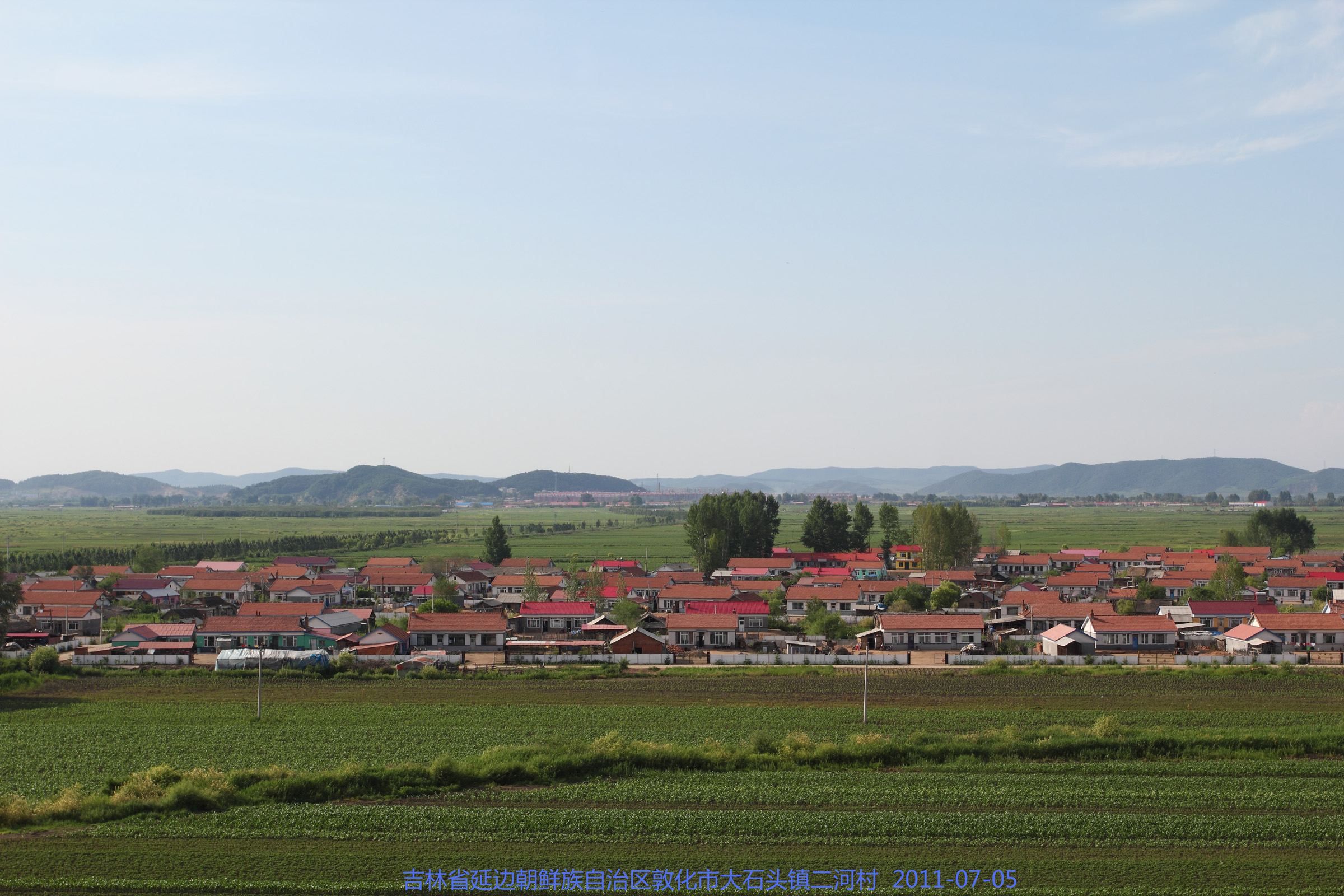

- Location within Jilin
- Coordinates: 43°18′10″N 128°30′30″E
- Country: China
- Province: Jilin
- Autonomous prefecture: Yanbian Korean Autonomous Prefecture
- County-level city: Dunhua

Area
  - Total: 1,398.6 km^{2} (540.0 sq mi)

Population
  - Total: 61,173
  - Density: 43.739/km^{2} (113.28/sq mi)

Dashitou (simplified Chinese: 大石头镇; traditional Chinese: 大石頭鎮; pinyin: Dàshítou Zhèn, Korean: 대석두진; RR: Daeseokdu Jin; MR: Taesŏktu Jin) is a town in Dunhua, Yanbian, Jilin. Dashitou is located approximately 25 kilometres (16 mi) east of Dunhua's urban center. The town has an area of 1,398.6 square kilometres (540.0 mi^{2}) total population of 61,173 people, and the total number of households is 17,264.

== Administrative divisions ==
Dashitou contains 8 residential communities and 20 administrative villages.

=== Residential communities ===
The town's 8 residential communities are as follows:

- Jinrong Community (Chinese: 金融社区)
- Shangye Community (Chinese: 商业社区)
- Xinghuo Community (Chinese: 星火社区)
- Xilin Community (Chinese: 西林社区)
- Tiebei Community (Chinese: 铁北社区)
- Donglin Community (Chinese: 东林社区)
- Nanlin Community (Chinese: 南林社区)
- Zhongxin Community (Chinese: 中心社区)

=== Administrative villages ===
The town's 20 administrative villages are as follows:

- Taipingchuan Village (Chinese: 太平川村)
- Dayushuchuan Village (Chinese: 大榆树川村)
- Dongsheng Village (Chinese: 东升村)
- Minsheng village (Chinese: 民胜村)
- Xinlitun Village (Chinese: 新立屯村)
- Hongxing Village (Chinese: 红星村)
- Erdaohezi Village (Chinese: 二道河子村)
- Sandaohezi Village (Chinese: 三道河子村)
- Ha'erbaling Village (Chinese: 哈尔巴岭村)
- Huizu Village (Chinese: 回族村)
- Zengyi Village (Chinese: 增益村)
- Changsheng Village (Chinese: 长胜村)
- Yongle Village (Chinese: 永乐村)
- Hebei Village (Chinese: 河北村)
- Dongchang Village (Chinese: 东昌村)
- Changqing Village (Chinese: 长青村)
- Yongqing Village (Chinese: 永青村)
- Mingxing Village (Chinese: 明星村)
- Sandaoliangzi Village (Chinese: 三道梁子村)
- Minqiangcun Village (Chinese: 民强村村)

== Demographics ==
Dashitou is home to populations of Han Chinese, Korean, Manchu, Hui, and Mongol ethnicities.

== Transportation ==
National Highway 302 runs through the town.

The Changchun-Tumen railway runs through Dashitou. The town is served by the Dashitou South railway station, which opened on April 10, 2018.
