= Erdaobaihe =

Township in Jilin division, China

Erdaobaihe 二道白河镇
- Town
- Location within China Location within Jilin
- Coordinates: 42.442°N 128.121°E
- Country: China
- Province: Jilin
- Autonomous prefecture: Yanbian
- County: Antu

Population (2020)
  - Total: 4,791
- Postal code: 133000
- Area code: 0433
- Vehicle registration: 吉H

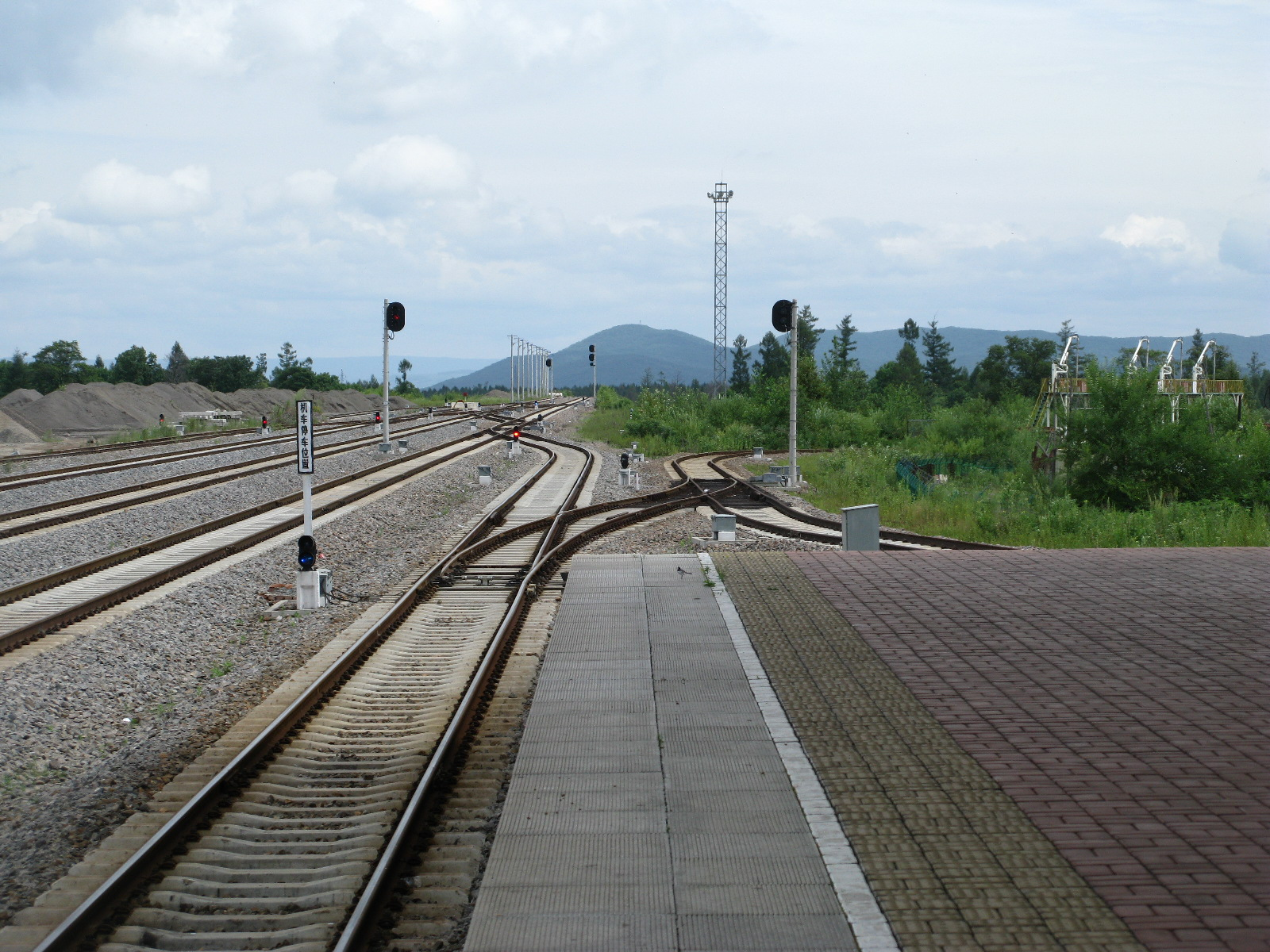
Baihe railway station, which is located in Erdaobaihe

Erdaobaihe is a town in Antu County, Yanbian, Jilin, China. Erdaobaihe is subdivided into Hongfeng Village, Anbei Village, Changsheng Village, Tiebei Village, Toudaobaihe Village, Changbai Village, Baoma Village and Naitoushan Village. The town had a population of 4,791 in 2020. Erdaobaihe's economy is reliant on tourism as it is next to Changbai Mountain.

Unlike most other towns in China, it administers only the built up area, with the surrounding villages being administered directly by Antu County. The forest areas surrounding the town are administered by the Changbai Mountain Management Committee and by the Baihe Forestry Bureau.

== Climate ==
Climate data for Erdaobaihe Town, elevation 721 m (2,365 ft), (1991–2020 normals)
Month	Jan	Feb	Mar	Apr	May	Jun	Jul	Aug	Sep	Oct	Nov	Dec	Year
Mean daily maximum °C (°F)	−8.1 (17.4)	−4.4 (24.1)	2.8 (37.0)	11.8 (53.2)	19.6 (67.3)	23.5 (74.3)	26.0 (78.8)	25.2 (77.4)	20.3 (68.5)	13.2 (55.8)	2.1 (35.8)	−6.5 (20.3)	10.5 (50.8)
Daily mean °C (°F)	−15.5 (4.1)	−11.1 (12.0)	−3.0 (26.6)	5.5 (41.9)	12.7 (54.9)	17.1 (62.8)	20.2 (68.4)	19.5 (67.1)	13.2 (55.8)	5.9 (42.6)	−3.7 (25.3)	−12.8 (9.0)	4.0 (39.2)
Mean daily minimum °C (°F)	−22.9 (−9.2)	−18.7 (−1.7)	−9.3 (15.3)	−0.9 (30.4)	5.7 (42.3)	10.9 (51.6)	15.0 (59.0)	14.5 (58.1)	6.6 (43.9)	−1.1 (30.0)	−9.8 (14.4)	−19.5 (−3.1)	−2.5 (27.6)
Average precipitation mm (inches)	5.3 (0.21)	14.4 (0.57)	24.1 (0.95)	39.0 (1.54)	86.3 (3.40)	104.4 (4.11)	145.0 (5.71)	158.5 (6.24)	60.3 (2.37)	36.7 (1.44)	27.8 (1.09)	11.5 (0.45)	713.3 (28.08)
Average precipitation days (≥ 0.1 mm)	7.8	7.8	10.5	11.9	15.6	17.6	16.8	16.5	11.2	8.8	10.6	9.9	145
Average snowy days	9.3	8.9	11.6	6.9	0.5	0	0	0	0.1	3.3	10.4	11.9	62.9
Average relative humidity (%)	64	60	57	55	63	76	82	84	78	64	68	68	68
Mean monthly sunshine hours	192.5	188.8	218.4	203.3	230.0	215.1	212.7	200.4	216.7	212.5	162.2	165.4	2,418
Percentage possible sunshine	66	63	59	51	51	47	46	47	58	63	56	59	56
Source: China Meteorological Administration
