= Jilin railway station =

Railway station in Jilin City, China

Jilin 吉林站
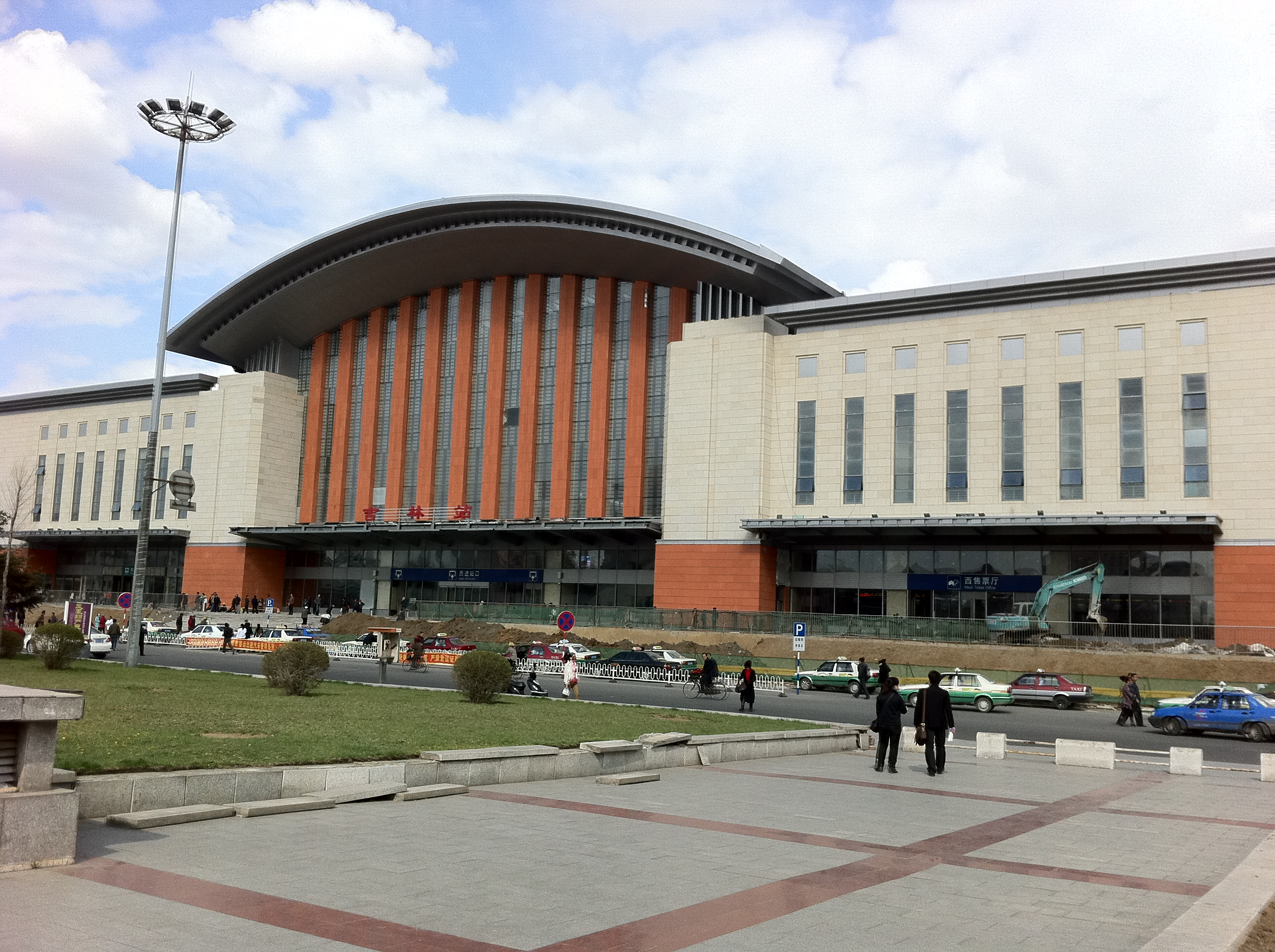
- Jilin railway station

General information
- Location: Changyi District, Jilin City, Jilin Province; China
- Coordinates: 43°51′26″N 126°34′17″E
- Operated by: China Railway Shenyang Group
- Line(s): Changchun–Jilin intercity railway Jilin–Hunchun intercity railway

Jilin railway station (Chinese: 吉林站; pinyin: Jílín zhàn) is a railway station of Changchun–Jilin intercity railway and Jilin–Hunchun intercity railway located in Changyi District, Jilin City, Jilin Province, China.

== See also ==
- Chinese Eastern Railway
- South Manchuria Railway
- South Manchuria Railway Zone

Preceding station	China Railway High-speed	Following station
Shuangji towards Changchun	Changchun–Jilin intercity railway	Terminus
Terminus	Jilin–Hunchun intercity railway	Jiaohe West towards Hunchun
