= Antu County =

Antu County 安图县 · 안도현
- County
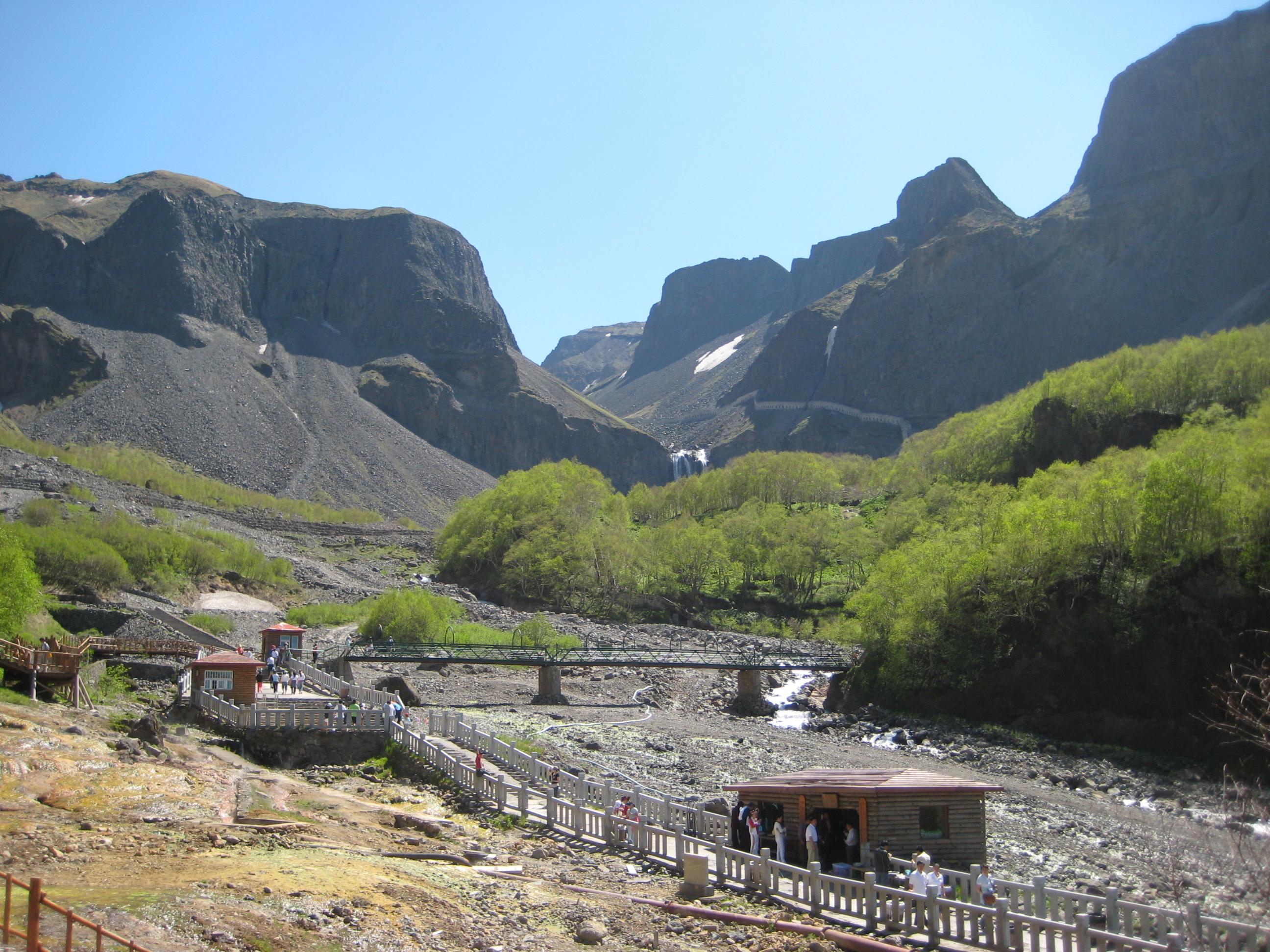

- Location in Jilin province
- Coordinates: 43°07′N 128°54′E
- Country: People's Republic of China
- Province: Jilin
- Prefecture: Yanbian
- County seat: Mingyue

Area
  - Total: 7,444 km^{2} (2,874 sq mi)
- Elevation: 355 m (1,165 ft)

Population (2020)
  - Total: 195,000
  - Density: 26.2/km^{2} (67.8/sq mi)
- Time zone: UTC+8 (China Standard)
- Postal code: 133600
- Website: www.antu.gov.cn/index.html

Antu County
- Simplified Chinese: 安图县
- Traditional Chinese: 安圖縣
Transcriptions
Standard Mandarin
- Hanyu Pinyin: Āntú Xiàn

Chinese Korean name
- Chosŏn'gŭl: 안도현
Transcriptions
- Revised Romanization: Ando-hyeon
- McCune–Reischauer: Ando-hyŏn

South Korean name
- Hangul: 안투 현
Transcriptions
- Revised Romanization: Antu Hyeon
- McCune–Reischauer: Ant'u Hyŏn

Antu County (simplified Chinese: 安图县; traditional Chinese: 安圖縣; pinyin: Āntú Xiàn; Chosŏn'gŭl: 안도현; Hangul: 안투현) is a county of southeastern Jilin province, Northeast China. It is under the administration of the Yanbian Korean Autonomous Prefecture. Antu is home to Korean and Manchu minorities. In 2020 it had a population of 195,000, of which 17.9% were Koreans. It has a border crossing with North Korea at Shuangmufeng (双目峰).

== Administrative divisions ==
Antu has seven towns and two townships.

Towns:

- Mingyue (明月镇 / 명월진)
- Songjiang (松江镇 / 송강진)
- Erdaobaihe (二道白河镇 / 이도백하진)
- Liangjiang (两江镇 / 량강진)
- Shimen (石门镇 / 석문진)
- Wanbao (万宝镇 / 만보진)
- Liangbing (亮兵镇 / 량병진)

Townships:

- Xinhe Township (新合乡 / 신합향)
- Yongqing Township (永庆乡 / 영경향)

== Climate ==
Climate data for Antu, elevation 367 m (1,204 ft), (1991–2020 normals, extremes 1981–present)
Month	Jan	Feb	Mar	Apr	May	Jun	Jul	Aug	Sep	Oct	Nov	Dec	Year
Record high °C (°F)	7.0 (44.6)	15.6 (60.1)	20.1 (68.2)	30.3 (86.5)	32.4 (90.3)	35.4 (95.7)	36.8 (98.2)	35.5 (95.9)	31.0 (87.8)	28.9 (84.0)	22.2 (72.0)	11.2 (52.2)	36.8 (98.2)
Mean daily maximum °C (°F)	−7.4 (18.7)	−2.9 (26.8)	4.2 (39.6)	13.6 (56.5)	20.2 (68.4)	23.8 (74.8)	26.3 (79.3)	25.9 (78.6)	21.4 (70.5)	13.8 (56.8)	2.8 (37.0)	−5.5 (22.1)	11.4 (52.4)
Daily mean °C (°F)	−14.9 (5.2)	−10.6 (12.9)	−2.5 (27.5)	6.4 (43.5)	12.9 (55.2)	17.6 (63.7)	21.0 (69.8)	20.4 (68.7)	13.9 (57.0)	5.9 (42.6)	−3.9 (25.0)	−12.3 (9.9)	4.5 (40.1)
Mean daily minimum °C (°F)	−21.1 (−6.0)	−17.5 (0.5)	−8.8 (16.2)	−0.6 (30.9)	6.0 (42.8)	12.3 (54.1)	16.7 (62.1)	16.1 (61.0)	8.3 (46.9)	−0.4 (31.3)	−9.3 (15.3)	−17.9 (−0.2)	−1.4 (29.6)
Record low °C (°F)	−37.1 (−34.8)	−34.3 (−29.7)	−26.2 (−15.2)	−11.0 (12.2)	−3.8 (25.2)	2.1 (35.8)	7.7 (45.9)	3.5 (38.3)	−4.7 (23.5)	−13.3 (8.1)	−26.7 (−16.1)	−33.7 (−28.7)	−37.1 (−34.8)
Average precipitation mm (inches)	6.2 (0.24)	9.0 (0.35)	18.3 (0.72)	35.1 (1.38)	71.6 (2.82)	99.6 (3.92)	155.4 (6.12)	126.1 (4.96)	64.6 (2.54)	30.9 (1.22)	22.1 (0.87)	8.4 (0.33)	647.3 (25.47)
Average precipitation days (≥ 0.1 mm)	5.6	6.1	7.9	8.7	15.1	15.5	15.3	14.6	10.1	8.0	7.9	6.5	121.3
Average snowy days	8.2	7.9	9.2	3.6	0.3	0	0	0	0	2.0	7.7	8.2	47.1
Average relative humidity (%)	63	59	56	54	64	75	80	81	77	65	65	64	67
Mean monthly sunshine hours	165.2	178.0	207.4	200.9	217.0	197.1	179.5	176.4	191.2	188.8	149.0	143.4	2,193.9
Percentage possible sunshine	57	60	56	50	48	43	39	41	52	56	52	51	50
Source: China Meteorological Administration all-time extreme temperature all-time February high

Climate data for Erdaobaihezhen, Antu, elevation 721 m (2,365 ft), (2005–2020 normals)
Month	Jan	Feb	Mar	Apr	May	Jun	Jul	Aug	Sep	Oct	Nov	Dec	Year
Mean daily maximum °C (°F)	−8.1 (17.4)	−4.4 (24.1)	2.8 (37.0)	11.8 (53.2)	19.6 (67.3)	23.5 (74.3)	26.0 (78.8)	25.2 (77.4)	20.3 (68.5)	13.2 (55.8)	2.1 (35.8)	−6.5 (20.3)	10.5 (50.8)
Daily mean °C (°F)	−15.5 (4.1)	−11.1 (12.0)	−3.0 (26.6)	5.5 (41.9)	12.7 (54.9)	17.1 (62.8)	20.2 (68.4)	19.5 (67.1)	13.2 (55.8)	5.9 (42.6)	−3.7 (25.3)	−12.8 (9.0)	4.0 (39.2)
Mean daily minimum °C (°F)	−22.9 (−9.2)	−18.7 (−1.7)	−9.3 (15.3)	−0.9 (30.4)	5.7 (42.3)	10.9 (51.6)	15.0 (59.0)	14.5 (58.1)	6.6 (43.9)	−1.1 (30.0)	−9.8 (14.4)	−19.5 (−3.1)	−2.5 (27.6)
Average precipitation mm (inches)	5.3 (0.21)	14.4 (0.57)	24.1 (0.95)	39.0 (1.54)	86.3 (3.40)	104.4 (4.11)	145.0 (5.71)	158.5 (6.24)	60.3 (2.37)	36.7 (1.44)	27.8 (1.09)	11.5 (0.45)	713.3 (28.08)
Average precipitation days (≥ 0.1 mm)	7.8	7.8	10.5	11.9	15.6	17.6	16.8	16.5	11.2	8.8	10.6	9.9	145
Average snowy days	9.3	8.9	11.6	6.9	0.5	0	0	0	0.1	3.3	10.4	11.9	62.9
Average relative humidity (%)	64	60	57	55	63	76	82	84	78	64	68	68	68
Mean monthly sunshine hours	192.5	188.8	218.4	203.3	230.0	215.1	212.7	200.4	216.7	212.5	162.2	165.4	2,418
Percentage possible sunshine	66	63	59	51	51	47	46	47	58	63	56	59	56
Source: China Meteorological Administration
