= Dunhua–Baihe high-speed railway =

High-speed railway line in China

Overview
- Status: Operational
- Termini: Dunhua; Changbaishan
- Stations: 4

Service
- Type: Heavy rail

History
- Opened: 24 December 2021

Technical
- Line length: 113 km (70 mi)
- Track gauge: 1,435 mm (4 ft 8 1/2 in) standard gauge
- Electrification: 50 Hz 25,000 V
- Operating speed: 250 km/h (155 mph)

The Dunhua–Baihe high-speed railway, or Changbaishan–Dunhua section of Shenyang–Jiamusi high-speed railway, is a high-speed railway line in China. It is 113 kilometres (70 mi) long and has a design speed of 250 kilometres per hour (160 mph).

== History ==
Construction on the line began in August 2017. Trial operation began on 29 October 2021. It opened on 24 December 2021.

== Route ==
The line runs from north to south, starting at the existing Dunhua railway station. It has two intermediate stations, Dunhua South and Yongqing. The southern terminus is Changbaishan.
