= Dunhua =

Dunhua 敦化市 · 돈화시
- County-level city
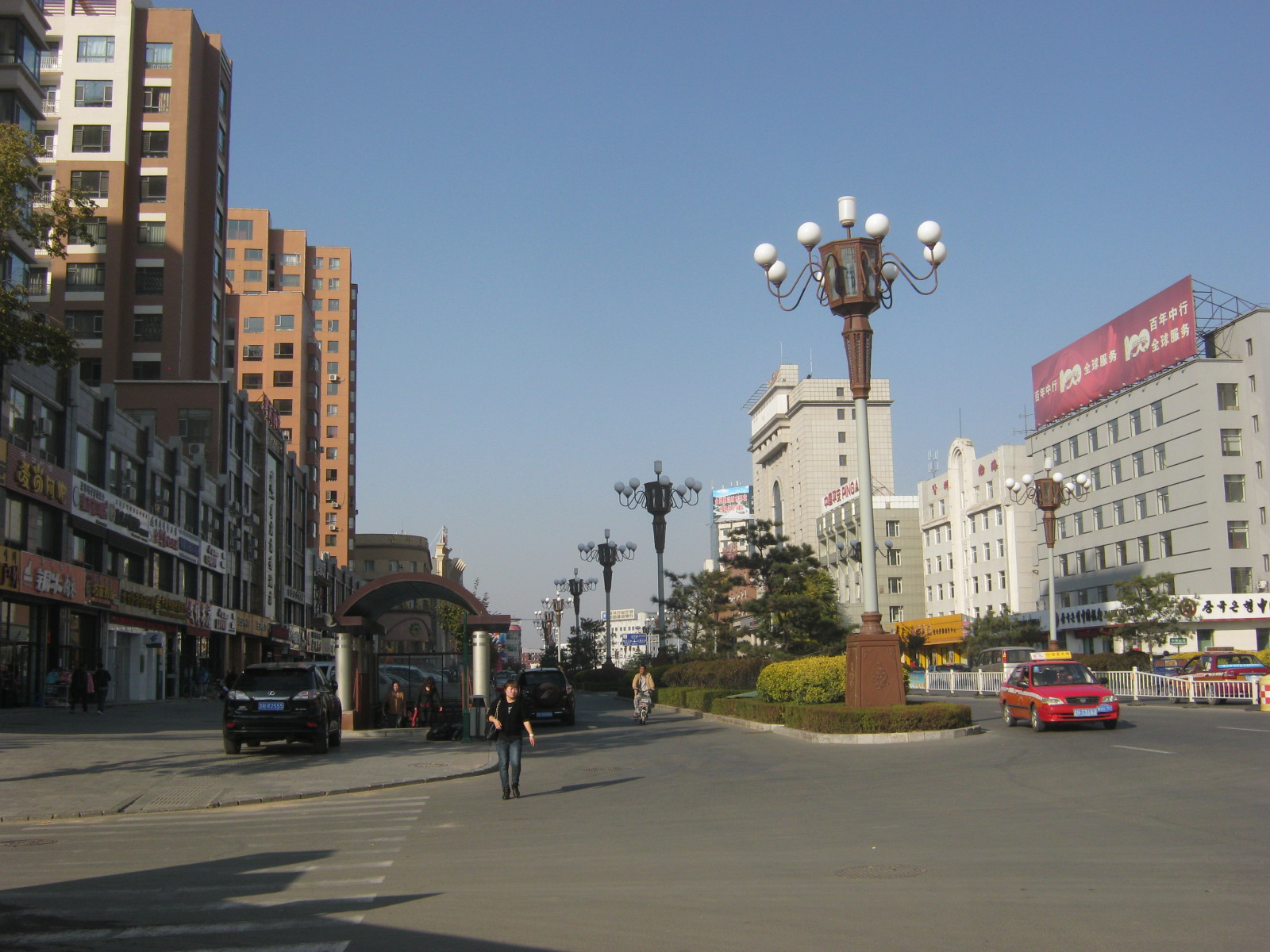
- Dunhua in 2013

- Location in Jilin province
- Coordinates: 43°22′N 128°14′E
- Country: China
- Province: Jilin
- Prefecture: Yanbian
- Municipal seat: Minzhu Subdistrict

Area
  - County-level city: 11,957.0 km^{2} (4,616.6 sq mi)
  - Urban: 116.00 km^{2} (44.79 sq mi)
- Elevation: 505 m (1,657 ft)

Population (2020 census)
  - County-level city: 392,486
  - Density: 32.8248/km^{2} (85.0158/sq mi)
  - Urban: 201,900
- Time zone: UTC+8 (China Standard)
- Postal code: 133700
- Area code: 0433
- Website: www.dunhua.gov.cn

Dunhua
- Chinese: 敦化市
Transcriptions
Standard Mandarin
- Hanyu Pinyin: Dūnhuà Shì

Chinese Korean name
- Chosŏn'gŭl: 돈화시
- Hancha: 敦化市
Transcriptions
- Revised Romanization: Donhwa-si
- McCune–Reischauer: Tonhwa-si

South Korean name
- Hangul: 둔화시
Transcriptions
- Revised Romanization: Dunhwa Si
- McCune–Reischauer: Tunhwa Si

Dunhua (Chinese: 敦化; Korean: 돈화) is a county-level city of the Yanbian Korean Autonomous Prefecture in southeastern Jilin province, China. It has more than 480,000 inhabitants (as of 2002) and was the capital of Balhae between 742 and 756, known at the time as "Junggyeong". During the Qing dynasty it was called Áodōng (敖东) in Chinese and Odoli in Manchu.

== Geography and climate ==
Dunhua is situated amongst the Changbai Mountains, its administrative area spanning 42°42′−44°30′ N latitude and 127°28′−129°13′ E longitude, reaching a maximal north–south extent of 200 km (124 mi) and east–west width of 142 km (88 mi). Its total area of 11,957 km^{2} (4,617 sq mi) makes it, by area, the largest county-level city of the province.

Dunhua has a four-season, monsoon-influenced, humid continental climate (Köppen Dwb), with long, very cold winters, and short, but warm, humid summers. Spring and autumn constitute very short transitions with some, but usually not heavy, rainfall. The monthly 24-hour average temperature ranges from −16.2 °C (2.8 °F) in January to 20.2 °C (68.4 °F) in July, while the annual mean is 3.8 °C (38.8 °F) and a total precipitation of 633.7 mm (24.9 in), more than 60% of which falls from June through August.

Liuding Mountain is located 5 km south of Dunhua. The mountain is one of the AAAAA Tourist Attractions of China, and contains tombs from the Balhae kingdom, a large monastery and a 48-meter-tall (157 ft) statue of the Buddha.

Climate data for Dunhua, elevation 525 m (1,722 ft), (1991–2020 normals, extremes 1971–2010)
| Month | Jan | Feb | Mar | Apr | May | Jun | Jul | Aug | Sep | Oct | Nov | Dec | Year |
|---|---|---|---|---|---|---|---|---|---|---|---|---|---|
| Record high °C (°F) | 5.6 (42.1) | 12.7 (54.9) | 18.3 (64.9) | 29.0 (84.2) | 32.4 (90.3) | 34.5 (94.1) | 36.4 (97.5) | 33.3 (91.9) | 29.2 (84.6) | 28.3 (82.9) | 20.2 (68.4) | 8.4 (47.1) | 36.4 (97.5) |
| Mean daily maximum °C (°F) | −8.8 (16.2) | −4.3 (24.3) | 2.8 (37.0) | 12.5 (54.5) | 19.5 (67.1) | 23.8 (74.8) | 26.2 (79.2) | 25.2 (77.4) | 20.5 (68.9) | 12.7 (54.9) | 1.5 (34.7) | −6.8 (19.8) | 10.4 (50.7) |
| Daily mean °C (°F) | −15.6 (3.9) | −11.1 (12.0) | −3.2 (26.2) | 6.0 (42.8) | 12.9 (55.2) | 17.9 (64.2) | 20.9 (69.6) | 19.9 (67.8) | 13.8 (56.8) | 5.7 (42.3) | −4.2 (24.4) | −12.8 (9.0) | 4.2 (39.5) |
| Mean daily minimum °C (°F) | −21.1 (−6.0) | −17.2 (1.0) | −8.9 (16.0) | −0.1 (31.8) | 6.6 (43.9) | 12.5 (54.5) | 16.5 (61.7) | 15.5 (59.9) | 8.1 (46.6) | −0.2 (31.6) | −9.1 (15.6) | −17.9 (−0.2) | −1.3 (29.7) |
| Record low °C (°F) | −35.9 (−32.6) | −33.9 (−29.0) | −26.8 (−16.2) | −13.7 (7.3) | −9.6 (14.7) | 1.4 (34.5) | 7.4 (45.3) | 3.0 (37.4) | −6.0 (21.2) | −19.3 (−2.7) | −31.5 (−24.7) | −34.1 (−29.4) | −35.9 (−32.6) |
| Average precipitation mm (inches) | 4.7 (0.19) | 8.6 (0.34) | 17.4 (0.69) | 28.9 (1.14) | 70.6 (2.78) | 100.4 (3.95) | 145.1 (5.71) | 134.8 (5.31) | 65.7 (2.59) | 30.0 (1.18) | 18.1 (0.71) | 7.1 (0.28) | 631.4 (24.87) |
| Average precipitation days (≥ 0.1 mm) | 4.8 | 5.0 | 7.6 | 8.6 | 14.1 | 15.0 | 15.3 | 14.4 | 9.6 | 8.5 | 8.4 | 7.2 | 118.5 |
| Average snowy days | 9.1 | 8.5 | 10.5 | 5.5 | 0.4 | 0 | 0 | 0 | 0.1 | 3.1 | 10.2 | 10.4 | 57.8 |
| Average relative humidity (%) | 65 | 60 | 57 | 53 | 60 | 71 | 78 | 80 | 74 | 64 | 65 | 67 | 66 |
| Mean monthly sunshine hours | 161.3 | 178.0 | 207.2 | 203.3 | 219.1 | 207.0 | 187.7 | 182.6 | 200.6 | 185.8 | 145.7 | 143.2 | 2,221.5 |
| Percentage possible sunshine | 55 | 60 | 56 | 50 | 48 | 45 | 41 | 43 | 54 | 55 | 51 | 52 | 51 |
Source 1: China Meteorological Administration
Source 2: Weather China

== Administrative divisions ==
Dunhua has four subdistricts, 11 towns, and five townships.

| Name | Simplified Chinese | Hanyu Pinyin | Korean | McCune–Reischauer | Administrative division code |
|---|---|---|---|---|---|
Subdistricts
| Bohai Subdistrict | 渤海街道 | Bóhǎi jiēdào | 발해가도 | palhae kato | 222403001 |
| Shengli Subdistrict | 胜利街道 | Shènglì jiēdào | 승리가도 | sŭngri kato | 222403002 |
| Minzhu Subdistrict | 民主街道 | Mínzhǔ jiēdào | 민주가도 | minchu kato | 222403003 |
| Danjiang Subdistrict | 丹江街道 | Dānjiāng jiēdào | 단강가도 | minchu kato | 222403004 |
Towns
| Dashitou | 大石头镇 | Dàshítóu zhèn | 대석두진 | taesŏktu chin | 222403100 |
| Huangnihe | 黄泥河镇 | Huángníhé zhèn | 황니하진 | hwangniha chin | 222403101 |
| Guandi | 官地镇 | Guāndì zhèn | 관지진 | kwanchi chin | 222403102 |
| Shaheyan | 沙河沿镇 | Shāhéyán zhèn | 사하연진 | sahayŏn chin | 222403103 |
| Qiuligou | 秋梨沟镇 | Qiūlígōu zhèn | 추리구진 | ch'uriku chin | 222403104 |
| Aegmog | 额穆镇 | Émù zhèn | 액목진 | aekmok chin | 222403105 |
| Xianru | 贤儒镇 | Xiánrú zhèn | 현유진 | hyŏnyu chin | 222403106 |
| Dapuchaihe | 大蒲柴河镇 | Dàpúcháihé zhèn | 대푸채하진 | taep'uch'aeha chin | 222403107 |
| Yanminghu | 雁鸣湖镇 | Yànmínghú zhèn | 안명호진 | anmyŏngho chin | 222403108 |
| Jiangyuan | 江源镇 | Jiāngyuán zhèn | 강원진 | kangwŏn chin | 222403109 |
| Jiangnan | 江南镇 | Jiāngnán zhèn | 강남진 | kangnam chin | 222403110 |
Townships
| Daqiao Township | 大桥乡 | Dàqiáo xiāng | 대교향 | taekyo hyang | 222403200 |
| Heishi Township | 黑石乡 | Hēishí xiāng | 흑석향 | hŭksŏk hyang | 222403201 |
| Qinggouzi Township | 青沟子乡 | Qīnggōuzi xiāng | 청구자향 | ch'ŏngkucha hyang | 222403202 |
| Hanzhang Township | 翰章乡 | Hànzhāng xiāng | 한장향 | hanchang hyang | 222403203 |
| Hongshi Township | 红石乡 | Hóngshí xiāng | 홍석향 | hongsŏk hyang | 222403204 |

== Sister cities ==
- Dongjak-gu, Seoul of South Korea (1968)
