= Korean Righteous Corps =

1919–1919 Korean pro-independence group

- Leader: Seo Il
- Founded: May 1919
- Dissolved: October 1919
- Country: Korea
- Headquarters: Jiandao
- Ideology: Korean independence movement Daejongism; Cheondoism; Confucianism
- Size: 500

- Korean Righteous Corps
- Hangul: 대한정의단
- Hanja: 大韓正義團
- Revised Romanization: Daehanjeonguidan
- McCune–Reischauer: Taehanjŏngŭidan

The Korean Righteous Corps (Korean: 대한정의단) was a short-lived militant Korean independence activist organization from May to October 1919. It was founded as a union of Daejong followers and believers of other religions, such as the Confucian Church. The Korean Justice Corps aimed to carry out a secret armed struggle to achieve independence, and its leader was Seo Il. The Korean Justice Corps contributed to promoting the necessity of the anti-Japanese independence struggle and promoting national consciousness. They reorganized into the Northern Military Government but they changed the name to Northern Military Administration Office under the Provisional Government of the Republic of Korea.

== Background ==
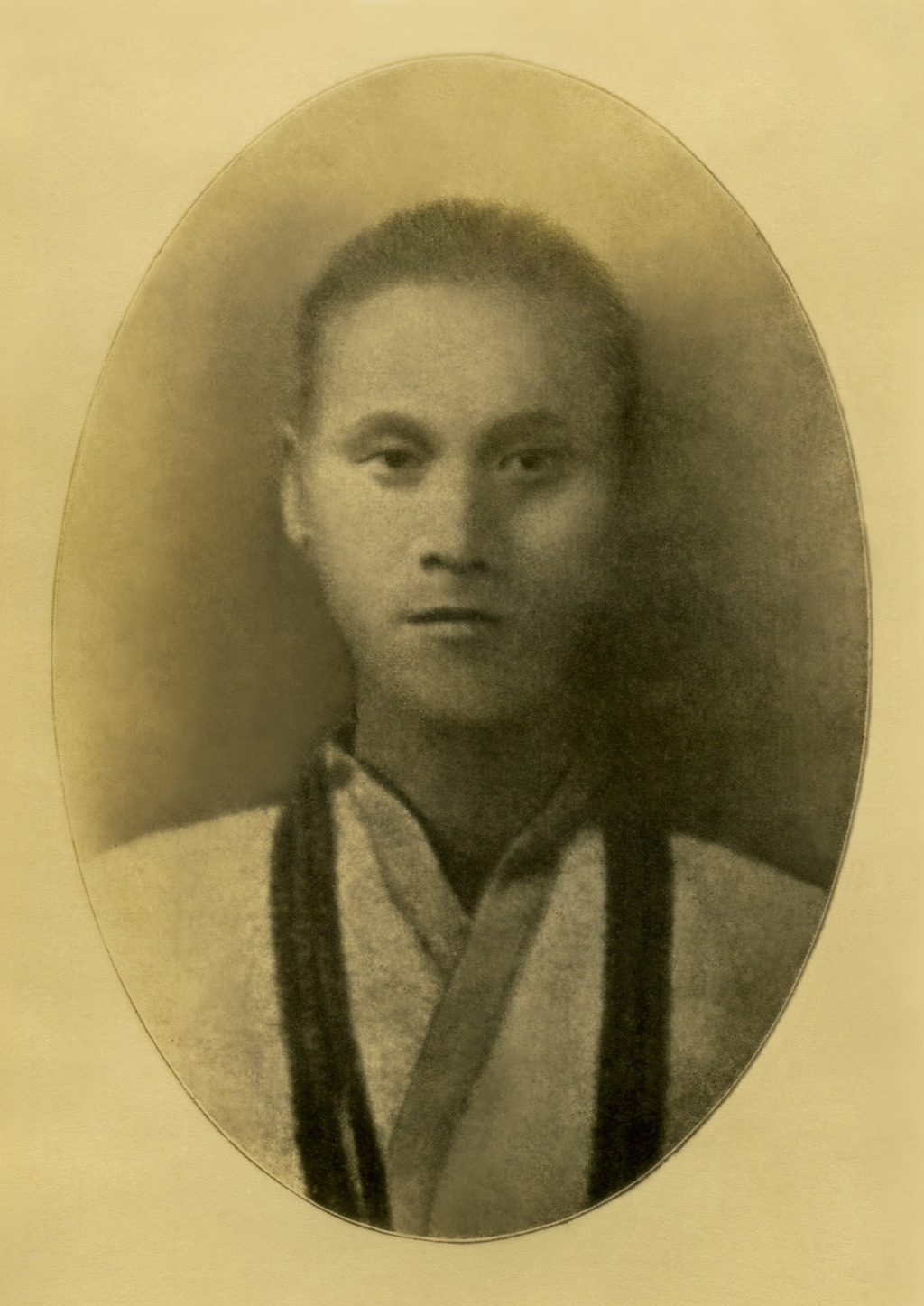
Seo Il, the Daejonggyo priest who inspired the militant Korean Independence Movements and became president of the Korean Righteous Corps.

In March 1919, immediately after the March 1st Movement, many independence movement groups were organized in the region of North Jiandao. There were about 70 organizations. The Korean Righteous was one of those organizations which was established in March 25, 1919, with Seo-il (徐一) and many Daejonggyo members such as Gyehwa, Chaeo, and Yanghyeon. It was organized on the basis of the Central Light Corps.

=== Central Light Corps ===
The Central Light Corps is an armed group established by the Daejong Church (大倧敎團) in North Gando in March 1911. It was established in Wangcheong County in March 1911 by members of the Daejong Church who fled to North Gando. Seo Il was the leader, while the executives of Daejonggyo were Baek Sun, Hyeon Cheon-muk, Park Chan- ik, Gye-hwa, Kim Byeong-deok [Kim Seong], Chae-oh, Yang Hyeon (梁賢) and Lee Hong-rae (李鴻來).

Although they aimed for armed struggle, they did not have the resources to acquire weapons, so they focused on strengthening the capabilities of the Korean community. From 1911 to 1916, he established 25 schools and operated them and provided education as a principal or teacher, to cultivate talented people.

Kim Gyo- heon, who became the second Taosagyo of Daejonggyo in 1916, went into exile in Bukgando the following year and prepared for an armed struggle in earnest and launched a diplomatic independence movement. Wangqing County was used as the base for the resistance against Japan, Gopyeong was stationed in Vladivostok, Lee Min-bok was stationed in Nikolsk-Usurisky, Baek Sun was stationed in Milsan in Northern Manchuria, and Jin Hak-shin was stationed in Northern Manchuria. He attempted to connect with the independence movement forces in Manchuria and the Maritime Province by dispatching them to Korea. Baeksun and Lee Beom-yoon toured the border regions of Russia and China to recruit volunteer soldiers. In October 1918, Gyehwa hired a bomb maker and went to Jilin. Seong Kim and Shin Jeong was dispatched as a first- party delegation, but returned midway.

=== March 1st ===
When the March 1st Movement broke out in 1919, the Central Light Corps along with Daejonggyo members held anti-Japanese demonstrations along with Christians and Cheondogyo members. They launched a demonstration for national independence centered on Wangcheong-hyeon, Ando-hyeon, and Yangil-hyeon. Immediately after the 3·13 Yongjeong demonstration, a secret organization called 'Free Industrial Complex' was formed at Guoji Street in Yanji County to raise human resources and military funds for the war against Japan, and a monthly salary per person was established. It was decided to collect membership fees of 1 won each.

On March 18, 1919, Kim Hyeon-muk (金賢黙) met with Christian Kim Ha-beom (金河範) and others, held a protest with 900 people, including prisoners and students. On March 24, 1919, Hyun Cheon-muk took the lead in the protest movement with a crowd of about 800 people in Ido-gu, Yanji County. On March 26, 1919, in Baekcho-gu, Wangcheong-hyeon, Gyehwa, Kim Seok-gu, and Koo Ja-ik led a rally of about 1,200 people was held and a ceremony to celebrate the declaration of independence was held while waving the Korean flag.

== Foundation ==
A union of Daejong followers and believers of other religions, such as the Confucian Church founded the Korean Righteous Corps around May 1919. They aimed to carry out a secret armed struggle to achieve independence, and its leader was Seo Il. The Korean Righteous Corps contributed to promoting the necessity of the anti-Japanese independence struggle and promoting national consciousness. From the beginning, independence activists had expected that the issue of Korea's independence would be discussed in accordance with the principle of national self-determination at the Paris Peace Conference held at the end of June 1919 after the March 1 Declaration of Independence. However, as no results were achieved contrary to expectations, the anti-Japanese armed movement, which valued the armed line rather than the diplomatic line, began to grow.

In August 1919, the Korean Righteous Corps organized the Military Administration Association as an armed group for the struggle for independence under its umbrella and distributed creative statements calling for the unity of Korean compatriots for the anti-Japanese independence struggle. Afterwards, members of Daejong Church felt the need to recruit personnel with military experience. Accordingly, on August 7, 1919, Kim Jwa-jin joined the Righteous Corp to train an independence army.

== Internal strife ==
However around August 1919, there was a split between Daejongyo believers and the New People's Association, and Confucian believers due to internal conflict between republicanism and monarchism. The fact that the New People's Association-affiliated nationalists took charge of the military administration association caused opposition from members of the Confucian Church. This is because the New People's Association group were republicans, while the Confucian church supported the monarchy and were pro-Joseon dynasty loyalists. Eventually, after conflict, on the 16th of the same month, Kim Seong-guk and the Confucius members broke away from the Korean Righteous Corps.

== Organization ==
The Corps cooperated with various independent organizations in Noryeong and the northern Manchurian area with the support of its friends. It was truly the central organization of the liberation movement in Northeast Manchuria, and also paid special attention to local administration and industrial promotion and worked hard to provide guidance. He also contributed greatly to education by establishing elementary schools and night classes in the villages of Korean residents under their jurisdiction. They even published pure hangul journals such as 『Ilminbo (一民報)』 and 『New Gukbo (新國報)』.

=== Korean Military Administration Association ===
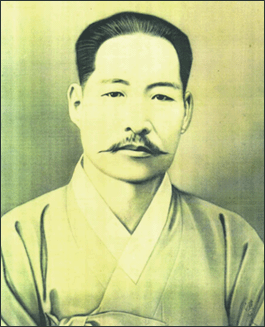
Kim Chwa-chin, commander of the Korean Military Administration Association.

The Korean Military Administration Association (Daehangunjeonghhoe; 대한군정회; 大韓軍政署)), an armed group organized by the Korean Justice Corps in August 1919. However, because the existing leaders of the Korean Justice Corps were non-experts in military matters, they invited Kim Jwa-jin, a military attaché from the New People's Association, and others to guide the armed group and entrusted them with military training and the formation of an independent army. At that time, they had 500 troops (initial establishment).

==== Equipment ====
While struggling with a lack of weapons, they received large quantities of weapons purchased from the old Haesamwi through the special generosity of the Czech Legion that had been dispatched to Siberia during World War I. As a result, preparations were perfected and the morale of the soldiers was also boosted.

They had 500 long guns, 40 pistols, 3 machine guns, 1 million rounds of various bullets, and 100,000 won in military funds.

== Reorganization ==
In October 1919, the Korean Righteous Corps and the Military Administration Association merged and reorganized the entire organization under the name of the Northern Military Government (大韓軍政府). The president of the Korean military government was Seo Il, and the commander was Kim Jwa-jin.

In December of the same year of Dong Muo, Seo Il Jongsa collaborated with his religious comrades Hyeon Cheon-muk, Cho Seong-hwan, Lee Jang-nyeong, Lee Beom-seok, Kim Gyu-sik, Gye-hwa, Jeong Jeong, Lee Hong-rae, Na Jung-so, and Park Seong-tae to establish the Northern Military Government. Seo Il was elected president by popular vote. Seo Il established his headquarters in Seodaebo, Wangcheong County, a dense forest area adjacent to the border, and steadily proceeded with preparations for resistance.

To strengthen the military government, they established the Gyeongshin Branch, an intelligence liaison organization stationed in each place, and an officer training center was established in Sipripyeong, Wangcheong-hyeon and an officer training institution, devoting its efforts to training of both companies. The number of officer cadets at the time was 400, and the number of the first officer graduation ceremony held in the forest of Simnipyeong was 298.

Subsequently, the establishment of the new Korean Military Government was reported to the Provisional Government of the Republic of Korea in Shanghai and applied for recognition as a military institution under the Provisional Government. At this time, the Provisional Government of the Republic of Korea requested that the name 'Northern Military Government' be changed to Northern Military Administration Office. Because the military government, as its name suggests, is not a military government, it has been criticized for saying that there cannot be two governments in one compatriot society.

== See also ==
- Korean Independence Movement
  - List of militant Korean independence activist organizations
- Kim Chwa-chin
- Northern Military Administration Office
- Seo Il
- Daejongism
