= List of militant Korean independence activist organizations =

Rebel groups against the Empire of Japan

During the Japanese occupation of Korea, some groups participated in violent resistance against the Empire of Japan, as part of the Korean independence movement. They functioned as a big tent political movement that represented a wide array of ideologies, including democracy, socialism, nationalism, communism, and anarchism. Some of these groups were coordinated by or collaborated with political organizations such as the right-leaning Korean Provisional Government, as well as with various left-leaning parties. Many of them operated in the border region between Korea and China, particularly in Manchuria until roughly the end of World War II (1939–1945).

== Background ==
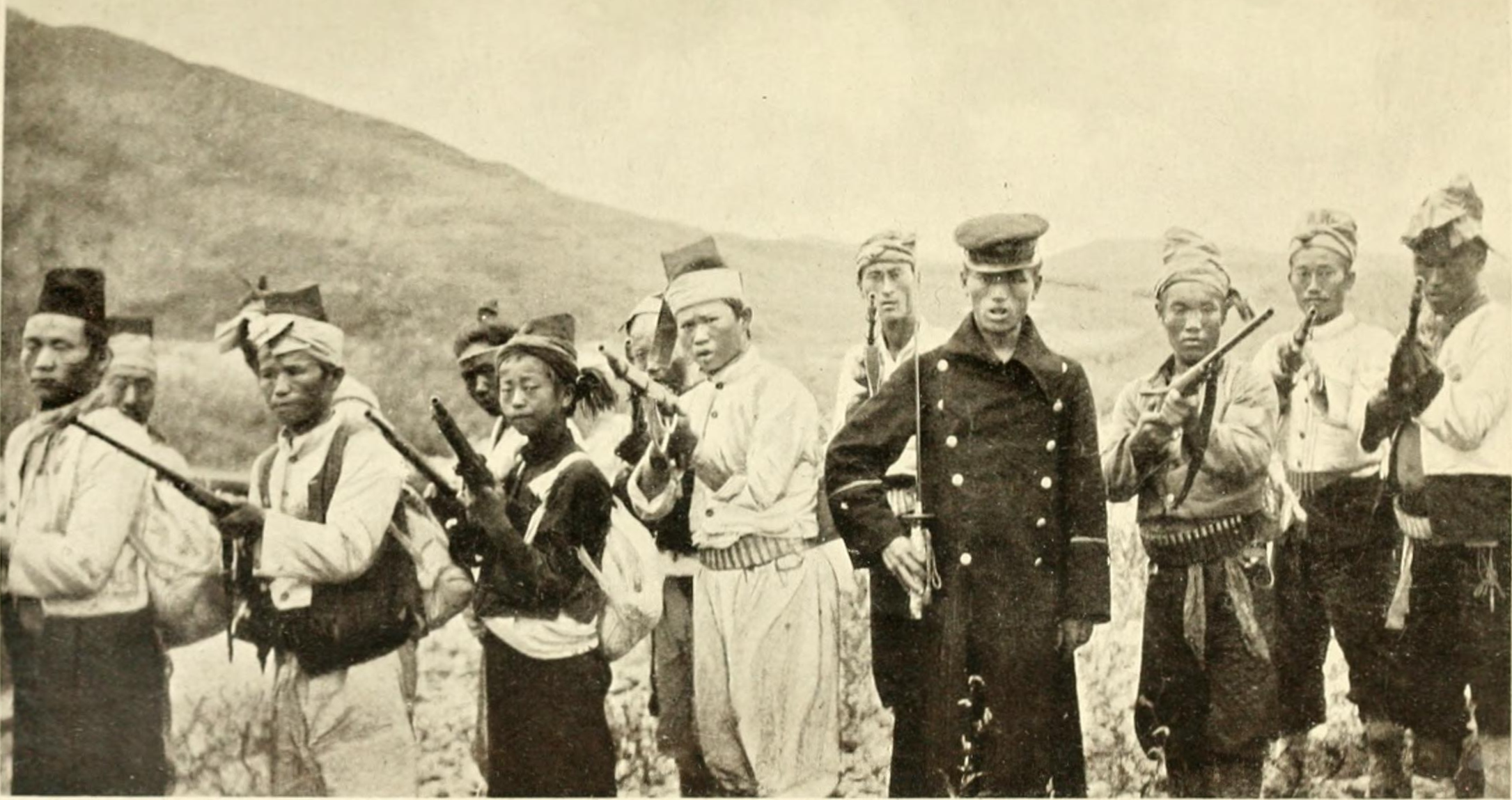
Righteous army of Jeongmi (1907)

Late Joseon dynasty period Korean nationalism outgrew the unplanned, spontaneous, and disorganized Donghak movement, and became more violent as Japanese colonizers began a brutal regime throughout the Korean peninsula and pursued repressive policies against the Korean people. For at least thirteen years after 1905, small irregular forces, often led by regular army commanders, fought skirmishes and battles throughout Korea against Japanese police, armies, and underworld mercenaries who functioned to support Japanese corporations in Korea, and as well-armed Japanese settlers who seized Korean farms and land. In one period, according to Japanese records in Boto Tobatsu-shi (Annals of the Subjugation of the Insurgent), between October 1907 and April 1908, over 1,908 attacks were made by the Korean people against the invaders.

The Righteous Army was formed by Yu In-seok and other Confucian scholars during the Peasant Wars. Its ranks swelled after the Queen's murder by the ronin. Under the leadership of Min Jeong-sik, Choe Ik-hyeon and Shin Dol-seok, the Righteous Army attacked the Japanese army, Japanese merchants and pro-Japanese bureaucrats in the provinces of Gangwon, Chungcheong, Jeolla and Gyeongsang. Shin Dol-seok, an uneducated peasant commanded over 3,000 troops. Among the troops were former government soldiers, poor peasants, fishermen, tiger hunters, miners, merchants, and laborers.

The Imperial Korean Armed Forces was disbanded on August 1, 1907. The Army was led by 1st Battalion Commander Major Park Seung-hwan, who committed suicide after the disbandment, and led to the former soldiers of the Korean Army fighting against the Japanese occupying troops in Namdaemun Gate. Many members of the disbanded army joined the Righteous Armies.

In 1907, the Righteous Army under the command of Yi In-yeong massed 10,000 troops to liberate Seoul and defeat the Japanese. The Army came within 12 km of Seoul but could not withstand the Japanese counter-offensive. The Righteous Army was no match for two infantry divisions of 20,000 Japanese soldiers backed by warships moored near Incheon. The Righteous Army retreated from Seoul and the war went on for two more years. Over 17,000 Righteous Army soldiers were killed and more than 37,000 were wounded in combat. Unable to fight the Japanese army head-on, the Righteous Army split into small bands of partisans to carry on the War of Liberation from China, Siberia, and the Baekdu Mountains in Korea. The Japanese troops first quashed the Peasant Army and then disbanded the remained of the government army. Many of the surviving guerrilla and anti-Japanese government troops fled to Manchuria and Primorsky Krai to carry on their fight. In 1910, Japan annexed Korea, starting the period of Japanese colonial rule.

== Summary ==
Flag of the Provisional Government of the Republic of Korea.

The March 1st Movement provided a catalyst for the Korean Independence Movement, which was crucial to the spread of Korea's independence movement to other local governments, including Hoengseong. Given the ensuing suppression and hunting down of activists by the Japanese, many Korean leaders went into exile in Manchuria, Shanghai and other parts of China, where they continued their activities. The Movement was a catalyst for the establishment of the Provisional Government of the Republic of Korea in Shanghai in April 1919 and several left-wing organizations.

They coordinated armed resistance such as the Northern Military Administration Office, the Korean Independence Army, and the Korean Patriotic Organization against the Imperial Japanese Army during the 1920s and 1930s, including at the Battle of Samdunja, Battle of Bongoh Town in June 1920 and the Battle of Chingshanli in October 1920. However, the Japanese sought revenge by massacring the Koreans at Gando, forcing the resistance forces to Mt. Milsan and form the Korean Independence Corps, then move to Free City, Russia. Their manpower diminished when the Bolsheviks believed them to be a liability to the Soviet Union during the Russian Civil War when the Japanese joined forces with the White Army and forced them disarm and join the Red Army. But they refused and the Red Army massacred them at Svobodny. Still, despite these losses, they executed the Hongkou Park Incident attack on Japanese military leadership in April 1932.

Although the Free City Incident depleted their manpower, many resistance forces advocated for an autonomous region for Koreans to replenish their military and promote their independence movement. The first attempt for self-governance was the Korean Unification Government, a military government formed to unify the resistance forces. However, infighting over political ideological leadership caused the government to fragment as the armies of this government established their own autonomous regions causing the government dissolve. The three self-governing Korean authorities that formed after the government's fall were the General Staff Headquarters on the Manchurian side of the Yalu River; the Righteous Government in the provinces of Jilin and Liaoning; and the Korean People's Association in Manchuria (Note: The New People's Government, also known as Shinmin Prefecture, is translated from the Korean: 신민부, romanized: Sinminbu.) in northern Manchuria. Although initially driven by Korean nationalism, they increasingly began to take up anarchist principles and socialist principles, in order to counter the rising influence of Marxism–Leninism in the region. (Note: The Korean People's Association (KPA), also known as the United Society of All Korean People (USAKP) or the General League of Koreans (GLK), is translated from the Korean: 재만한족총연합회, romanized: Hanjok Chongyeon Haphoe (HCH).)

The Japanese invaded Manchuria forced members of these authorities to defect and form the National People's Prefecture under a political party and their army, the Korean Revolutionary Party and the Korean Revolutionary Army. Some however formed political parties in the provisional government such as the Korean Independence Party and the Korean National Revolutionary Party with their own armed wings. They coordinated with the Chinese Nationalist and Communist armies such as the Northeast Anti-Japanese United Army against the Japanese armies to continue their fight for independence.

As they enter World War 2, their struggles culminated in the formation of the Korean Volunteer Army, and the Korean Liberation Army in 1940s, bringing together all Korean resistance groups in exile once more.

== 1910s ==
=== Korea Liberation Corps ===
The Korea Liberation Corps (Korean: 대한광복단) was a Korean association formed in 1913 to fight against Japanese rule. At its height its members numbered about 200. The corps was initially organized in Punggi by Kim Byeong-yeol, Kang Byeong-su, Yu Chang-sun, Jang Du-hwan, Yi Gak, Han Hun, Yu Jang-yeol, Jeong Jin-hwa, Chae Gi-jung, Jeong Man-gyo, Hwang Sang-gyu, Kim Sang-ok, and Jeong Un-hong. This group is sometimes called the "Punggi Gwangbokdan," or Punggi Liberation Corps. In 1915 this group united with a group of independence leaders in Daegu at an assembly in Dalseong Park, to officially form the Korea Liberation Corps. Its first commander-in-chief was Park Sang-jin. This anti-Japanese independence group sourced money for the training of troops, trained troops, planned assassinations of pro-Japanese Koreans (and other pro-Japanese in Korea), formed a provisional government, and worked with domestic and foreign organizations (to increase foreign understanding of Korea under Japanese occupation and get foreign funding) in the 1910s.

== 1920s ==
=== Heroic Corps ===
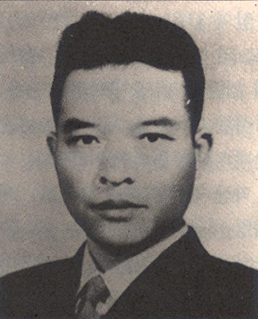
Kim Won-bong, commander of the Heroic Corps, and the Korean Volunteer Corps

The Heroic Corps was an organization founded in Korea in 1919, during the Japanese colonial period. Its activists believed in revolutionary uprising as well as egalitarianism.

After the March 1st Movement was crushed in 1919, many independence activists moved their bases to foreign countries. However, members of the Heroic Corps thought that those organizations were too moderate and would not contribute to independence in Korea, and instead took a more radical approach by opposing compromising solutions such as culturalism. The Heroic Corps wished for a violent revolution, reflected by the Manifesto of the Korean Revolution (조선혁명선언) by independence activist Shin Chae-ho. The Corps struggled for independence by assassinating high-ranking Japanese officials and committing acts of terrorism against government offices. The Heroic Corps moved their base to Beijing, China and brought members to Shanghai where they had about 70 members in 1924. Kim Gu, Kim Kyu-sik, Kim Chang-suk, and Shin Chae-ho were engaged as advisers and Chiang Kai-shek, President of the Republic of China, supported the Heroic Corps. However, as time passed, their movement evolved with the spirit of the times.

=== Korean Independence Army ===
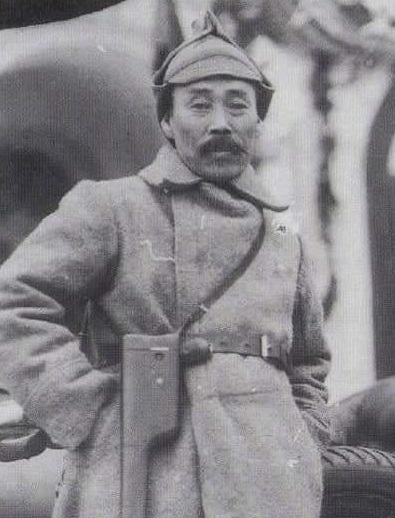
Hong Beom-do, commander of the Korean Independence Army in 1921

Korea Independence Army Marching Flag

In 1919, Hong Beom-do (1868 ~ 1943) created relations with Koreans residing in Yeonggae, Primorsky Krai, and Gando (Jiandao). The army crossed the Yalu River and wiped out a Japanese military unit. This was the first domestic military operation to take place in Korea following the March 1st Movement. In October, Hong's forces once again moved into Korea, occupied Ganggye and Manpojin, fighting a fierce battle with the Japanese army in Jaseong county, northern Korea. However, due to difficulties in supplying his weapons and logistics, in the winter of 1919, he went under the Korean National Association in Gando and received financial support. The number of soldiers increased to 600.

By March 1920, Hong was allied with the Military Affairs Command to provided a boost to the national spirit of Koreans everywhere and prompted further armed resistance struggles in Manchuria. 2,000 Korean independence fighters in the Jilin area attacked the camp of the Japanese army at night, killing 300 people and routing 400 while developing an independence movement while maintaining organic contact with the other independence groups. The army had moved its base from Antuhyun to Fengwudong, Wang Qinghyun, China and received financial support from the Korean People's Association for a larger domestic resistance operation. Hong also joined forces with the National Liberation Army, which was under the leadership of the Korean People's Association. The military's finances and administration were managed by the Korean Minjok Association and the Korean Independence Army was directed by Hong Beom-do. Around 200 old righteous soldiers and old farmers and laborers from Gando, centering on Hongbeom-do, purchased weapons from various places to train the independence army.

In the Battle of Baegunpyeong on the 21st of October, the Battle of Wanlugu, Battle of Cheonsupyung, Battle of Eorangchon on the 22nd, and the Battle of Cheonbosan on the 24th, the enemy lost 1,254 dead and over 2,000 wounded. Among them, the 1st Regiment under Hong Beom-do killed 1,200 enemy soldiers. After that, in fear of retaliation from the Japanese Empire, 600 members of the Korean Independence Army moved to Noryeong under the command of Commander Hong Beom-do and joined the Korean Independence Corps.

=== Cheonmasan Army ===
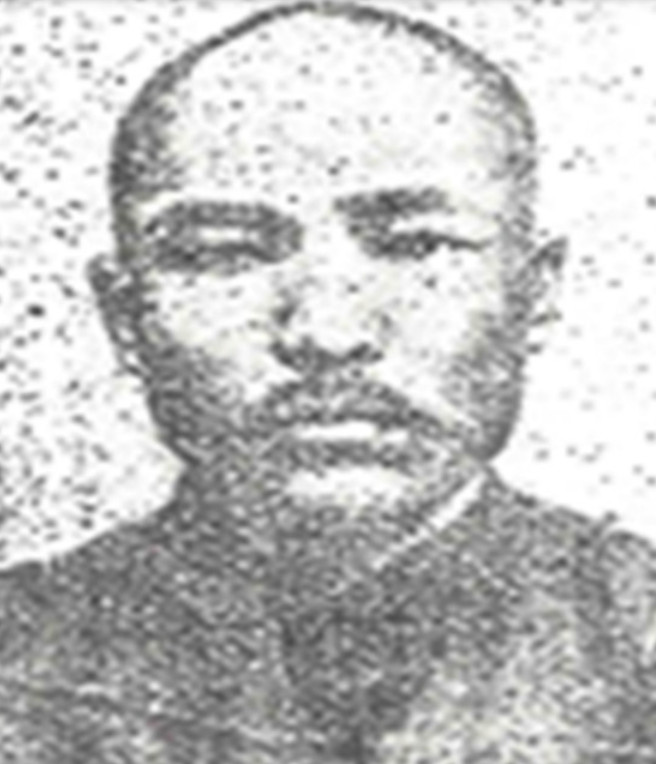
Choi Si-heung, commander of the Cheonmasan Army

The Cheonmasan Army was an organization that carried innovative guerrilla warfare among domestically based armed struggle groups from the March 1st Movement until the 1924s led by General Choi Si-heung and his younger brother Choi Si-chan. It is also called Cheonmadae, a name given because its base is located on Mt. Chŏnma (Chonma-san) in Goryeongsak-myeon, Uiju-gun, North Pyongan Province. It was also called Cheonmabyeolyeong and Cheolmabyeolyeong. Until the early 1920s, after the March 1st Movement, the Cheonmasan Army was evaluated as the most revolutionary guerrilla organization based in Korea. The Cheonmasan Corps achieved significant accomplishments by conducting fierce guerrilla warfare against the Japanese military and police. It closely cooperated with the independent military headquarters established in Manchuria. Afterwards, the Cheonmasan Corps participated as a part of various armed independence movements such as the Seorogunjeongseo (Western Route Military Government Office), Uimin Society, Byakpadae, and Giwon Independence Group. When their domestic activities became difficult, they moved to Manchuria and joined the Korean Provisional Government.

Due to the Japanese suppression of Independence activities, the Cheonmasandae joined with the General Command of the Liberation Army, which was carrying out armed activities there, and was expanded and reorganized into the Cheolmabyeolyeong of the Liberation Army. Accordingly, Cheonmasan Army took the lead in participating in the General Administration of the Liberation Army, Korean Unification Government, and the General Staff Headquarters. They established military discipline by guiding delinquent soldiers, while strengthening training to raise the volunteer army to the level of the regular army, earning great trust from General Oh Dong-jin, the commander-in-chief. The Cheonmasan Army's also incorporated into the Unification Government. When they reorganized into the Korean Unification Government, they were organized into the 3rd Company of the Volunteer Army. When the conflict between the Unification Government and the Righteous Army Command reached a serious level, the 1st, 2nd, 3rd, and 5th companies organized the General Staff Headquarters.

=== Patriotic Blood Corps ===
Emblem of the Patriotic Blood Corps

The Patriotic Blood Corps (Hyeolseongdan, (혈성단), (血誠團)) was an anti-Japanese armed group organized in Chupung, Primorsky Krai, Russia in 1920. It was founded by Kang Guk-mo, Kim Jong-hwa, and others based on members of the Korean Independence Corps who had moved from Western Jiandao. Chae Young (蔡英) was appointed commander and won the battle against the Japanese army in June 1920. In October 1920, after the Battle of Cheongsanri, they joined the armed groups gathered at Milsan and formed the Korean Independence Corps. To avoid pursuit by the Japanese army, they left Chupung and moved to Annuchino, where the headquarters of the Russian partisan unit was located. In November, this unit merged with Han Chang-geol's Suqing army and Park Gyeong-cheol's New People's Corps (Shimindan) at Trechii-pujin, a Korean village in the Chuguyev Valley. The commander of the integrated unit was Chae Young.

In Nov. 28, 1920, they moved to Baededun, Ohun County, Heilongjiang Province, Manchuria, and officially named the unit the Korean Patriotic Youth Blood Corps. Then they moved to Baedalchon, Baedalchon was an independence movement base located at the most northern place among the Korean villages in Manchuria and the Maritime Province, it was at the current administrative district of Wuyun, Jiayin County, Yichun City, Heilongjiang Province. Kim Guk-cho named this place as "Ounhyeon Baedaltun."

In early 1921, they moved to Iman, Maritime Province, then crossed over to Free City to engage in independence activities.Then Chae young and Jo Maeng-seon left for Irkutsk with Kim Gyeong-cheon's troops. He invited the officers to organize a military academy and train soldiers with Kim and the Korean Communist Party's Irkutsk Faction. On June 28, 1921, Free City Incident arose between Kim Gyeong-cheon, Kang Guk-mo, and Han Chang-geol over the operation of the unit. Son Pungik was shot to death, and the integrated unit was disbanded, and Kang Guk-mo returned to Chupung with some comrades and rebuilt the Patriotic Blood Corps. In the fall, the Patriotic Blood Corps participated in the battle to retake Olga Port led by Lee Won. In November 1922. In the Maritime Province, the order to disarm the Korean partisan unit was issued, and the Korean Patriotic Youth Blood Corps was disbanded.

=== Korean Independence Corps ===
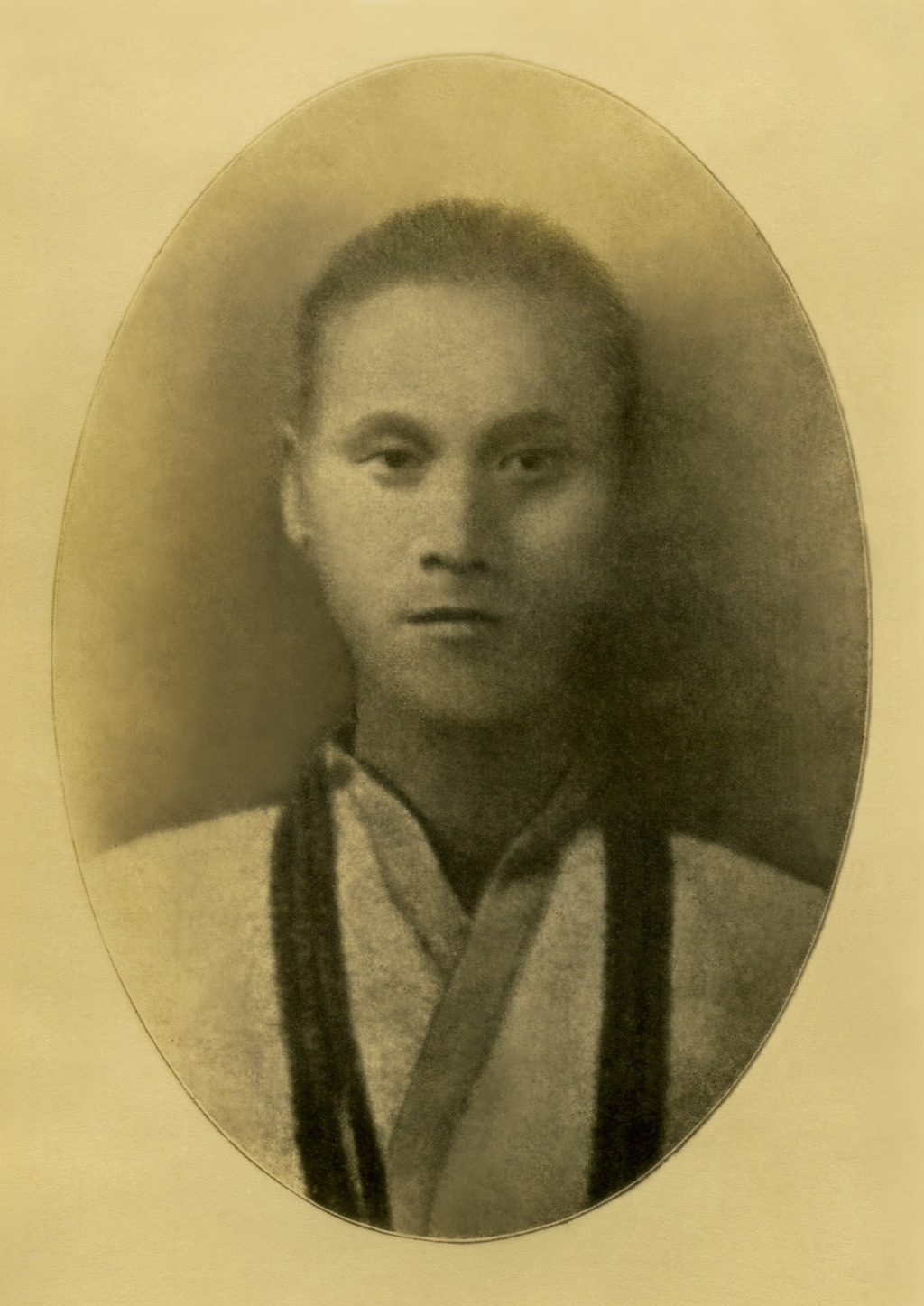
Seo Il, the Daejonggyo priest who inspired the militant Korean Independence Movements and became president of the Korean Righteous Corps, Northern Military Administration Office and the Korean Independence Corps.

At the request of the Chinese side, which could not overcome the pressure of Japan, the independence army units located in all parts of South and North Manchuria, especially in North Gando, moved to the direction of Milsan near the Sino-Soviet border to build a new anti-Japanese war base. In December 1920, under the leadership of Seo Il, the Northern Military Administration Alliance, the Korean Independence Army, the Korean New People's Association, the Korean National Association headed by Gu Chun-seon, and the Korean National Association in Honchun, the Military Affairs Command, Representatives of the Righteous Army Command, Hyolseongdan, Yadan, and Daehanjeonguigunjeongsa crossed over to the Maritime Province of Noryeong to wage a long-term anti-Japanese war. Decided to prepare, he organized this group in Milsan, the Korean Independence Corps (대한독립군단; 大韓獨立軍團). The total strength was about 3,500.

In the process of moving to Free City, the units that did not respond to disarmament returned to Manchuria from Iman, Primorsky Krai (now Dalnerechensk Province, Primorsky Krai, Russia). Units that moved to Free City suffered the Heihe Incident (Yiqing) in the process of integration. After the Heihe Incident, the remaining troops in Free City were reorganized into the Koryo Revolutionary Army. Afterwards, the Koryo Revolutionary Army moved to Irkutsk.

Efforts to create an independent corps by integrating the units of the Anti-Japanese Independence Army continued. As part of these efforts, a preparatory meeting for the military federation was organized in September 1924. Lee Beom-yoon (李範允) was appointed as the president and Kim Jwa-jin was appointed as the commander-in-chief. Kim Gyu-sik, Choi Jin-dong, Hyeon Cheon-muk, Kang Guk-mo, Nam Sung-geuk, Choi Ho, Park Doo-hee, Yoo Hyeon, Lee Jang-nyeong, etc. was active Centering on Dongnyeong County in Manchuria, it expanded its influence along the Dongji line connecting Subunhe to Harbin.

== 1930s ==
=== Korean Patriotic Organization ===
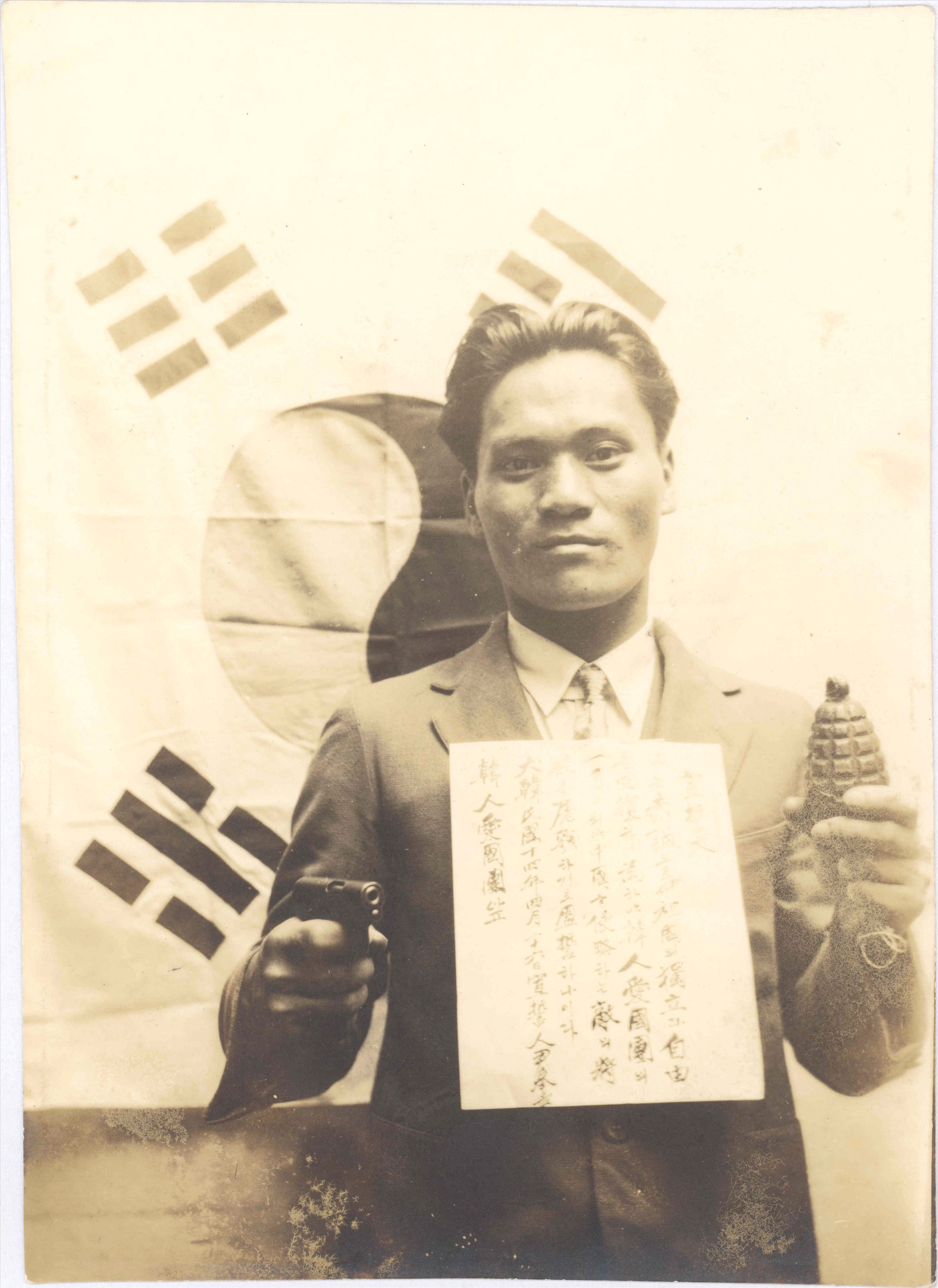
Yun Bong-gil

On September 18, 1931, the Empire of Japan staged the Liutiaohu incident (bombing of the Manchu railroad) and Mukden Incident. The Chinese people's anti-Japanese fervor proliferated because of these incidents. To promote Korea–China relations and to revitalize the depressed independence movement, the Provisional Government of the Republic of Korea founded a secret organization which would carry out covert missions to assassinate key Japanese figures. That task was entrusted to Kim Gu.

Kim Gu organized the Korean Patriotic Organization (한인애국단; 韓人愛國團) with about 80 members, mostly patriotic Korean youngsters. The organization was based in Shanghai, China. Leaders included Kim Suk, Ahn Gong-geun, Lee Su-bong, and Lee Yu-pil; other notable members were Yoo Sang-geun, Yoo Jin-man, Yun Bong-gil, Lee Bong-chang, Lee Duk-ju, and Choi Heung-sik. The Provisional Government of the Republic of Korea hope to shock and halt Japan's aggression with assassinations.

The Korean Patriotic Organization has been identified as being responsible for the assassination attempts. Following this, Japanese police authorities rushed to arrest key figures of the Provisional Government of the Republic of Korea by threatening the Shanghai French Concession. Many Korean activists sought refuge in Hangzhou and Jiaxing, through not all made it; among those arrested was Ahn Changho. The Provisional Government of the Republic of Korea eventually relocated to Hangzhou. Later it moved to Zhenjiang in 1935, and Nanjing in 1936. During that time, the activities of the Korean Patriotic Organization diminished.

== Armies of religious groups ==
=== Corps of the Great Light ===
The Corps of the Great Light (Junggwangdan (중광단)), (重光團)) is an armed group established by the Daejonggyo in North Gando in March 1911. It was established in Wangcheong County in March 1911 by members of the Daejong Church who fled to North Gando. Seo Il was the leader. Although they aimed for armed struggle, they did not have the resources to acquire weapons, so they focused on strengthening the capabilities of the Korean community. From 1911 to 1916, they established 25 schools and operated them and provided education as a principal or teacher, to cultivate talented people.

Kim Gyo- heon, who became the second Taosagyo of Daejonggyo in 1916, went into exile in Bukgando the following year and prepared for an armed struggle in earnest and launched a diplomatic independence movement. Wangqing County was used as the base for the resistance against Japan. He attempted to connect with the independence movement forces in Manchuria and the Maritime Province by dispatching them to Korea. Baeksun and Lee Beom-yoon toured the border regions of Russia and China to recruit volunteer soldiers.

==== March 1st ====
When the March 1st Movement broke out in 1919, the Central Light Corps along with Daejonggyo members held anti-Japanese demonstrations along with Christians and Cheondogyo members. They launched a demonstration for national independence centered on Wangcheong-hyeon, Ando-hyeon, and Yangil-hyeon. Immediately after the 3·13 Yongjeong demonstration, a secret organization called 'Free Industrial Complex' was formed at Guoji Street in Yanji County to raise human resources and military funds for the war against Japan, and a monthly salary per person was established. It was decided to collect membership fees of 1 won each.

On March 18, 1919, Kim Hyeon-muk (金賢黙) met with Christian Kim Ha-beom (金河範) and others, andDaejonggyo·CheondogyoA protest movement was held with 900 people, including prisoners and students. On March 24, 1919, Hyun Cheon-muk took the lead in the protest movement with a crowd of about 800 people in Ido-gu, Yanji County. On March 26, 1919, in Baekcho-gu, Wangcheong-hyeon, Gyehwa, Kim Seok-gu, and Koo Ja-ik led a rally of about 1,200 people was held and a ceremony to celebrate the declaration of independence was held while waving the Korean flag.

=== Korean Righteous Corps ===
Daejongism symbol.

The Korean Righteous Corps was a short-lived Korean Independence militant organization organized around May 1919 as a union of Daejonggyo followers and believers of other religions, such as the Confucian Church. The Korean Righteous Corps aimed to carry out a secret armed struggle to achieve independence, and its leader was Seo Il. The Korean Righteous Corps contributed to promoting the necessity of the anti-Japanese independence struggle and promoting national consciousness. They organized a military administration association to build an independence army. They reorganized into the Northern Military Government but they changed the name to Northern Military Administration Office under the Provisional Government of the Republic of Korea.

==== Korean Military Administration Association ====
The Korean Military Administration Association (Daehangunjeonghhoe), 대한군정회 (약칭 군정회), 大韓軍政署)), an armed group organized by the Korean Justice Corps in August 1919. However, because the existing leaders of the Korean Justice Corps were non-experts in military matters, they invited Kim Jwa-jin, a military attaché from the New People's Association, and others to guide the armed group and entrusted them with military training and the formation of an independent army. At that time, they had 500 troops (initial establishment).

=== Field Corps ===
The Field Corps was organized by the Cheonglimgyo, a branch of Cheondoism who were spreading their influence in North Manchuria immediately after the March 1st Movement, and the head of the Cheonglim religion was Sinpo (申砲). They took the lead and provided military training to young believers to prepare for anti-Japanese military activities. Cheonglimgyo, a sect of Donghak, was expanding its influence in Jilin (吉林) of Manchuria and the Northern Gando region with a strong anti-Japanese awareness.

After the death of Nam Jeong in 1904, their religion declined, but the second-generation religious leader Han Byeong-su organized the Field Corps in Daegu-dong, Serinha, Yeongil-hyeon and carried out an anti-Japanese armed struggle, and through the third-generation religious leader Tae Du-seop. The Field Group was emerging as the 'most active national independence movement group'.

They prepared for military activities, as they made thousands of military uniforms without weapons. It is said that after the September 18 Manchurian Incident in 1931, they played an active role in helping Ji Cheong-cheon, the commander-in-chief of the Korean Independence Army, but this is not certain. A Japanese report states that Lim Chang-se led the Field Corps as the leader.

==== Organization ====
This group bided its time by providing military training to young believers in each village. Although there were no weapons and only thousands of military uniforms were purchased, as many as 2,000 young men received military training. Kim Gwang-sook (金光淑), another leader of Cheonglimgyo, was also a key executive.

The organization of this dan was headed by Sinpo [申砲, aka Asorae (我笑來)], and the executives were Lim Chang-se (林昌世, aka Gapseok (甲石)) and Kim Gwang-suk (金光淑, aka Byeongju (秉圭)). ] etc. The headquarters was located at Dongbulsa Temple in Yanji County, and it is said that there were 20,000 youth members who received military training, but it is not clear whether this was reported to the Provisional Government.

== Armies of the Nationalist Parties ==
=== Korea Independence Party ===
==== Korea Independence Army ====
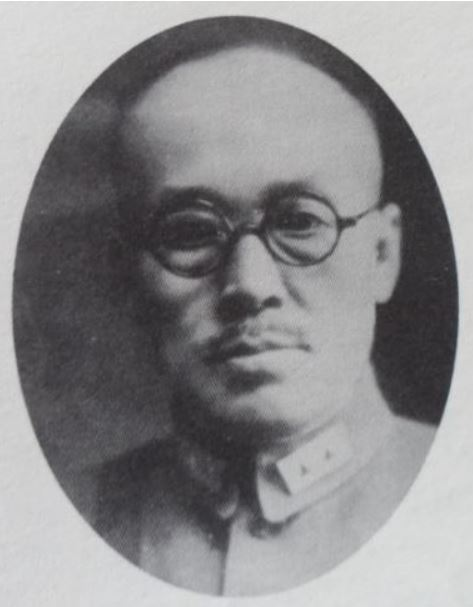
Ji Cheong-cheon, Commander-in-Chief of the Korean Independence Army

The Korean Independence Army (한국독립군; 韓國獨立軍), was formed by Kim Chwa-chin, chairman of the Korean People's Association in Manchuria in 1929. Effectively a peasant militia, the army's experienced soldiers were supplemented by guerrillas, trained in the prefecture's military academy, with which the army waged guerrilla warfare against both the Empire of Japan and Soviet Union. It also established a Safety Unit (치안대; Chiandae) and an Anti-Japanese Guerrilla Unit, in order to protect Koreans from local bandits and Imperial Japanese forces respectively.

After the Japanese invasion of Manchuria quashed the prefecture, Kim Koo's Korean Independence Party (한국독립군; 韓國獨立軍), absorbed the remnants of the army and placed them under the command of Ji Cheong-cheon. Its main goal was to carry out armed resistance against the Japanese colonial authorities in Korea. The Korea Independence Army consisted mainly of Korean exiles who had fled Korea to escape Japanese repression and Koreans living in China and other parts of Asia. It was initially based in Manchuria, a region in northeastern China, and the army conducted many guerrilla operations against Japanese forces in joint operations with the Chinese Army in Korea, including attacks on police stations, government offices, and other targets. Despite its efforts, the Korea Independence Army faced significant challenges due to its lack of resources and support. It could not mount a sustained campaign against the Japanese colonial authorities, and the organization was eventually dissolved in 1933.

=== Korean Revolutionary Party ===
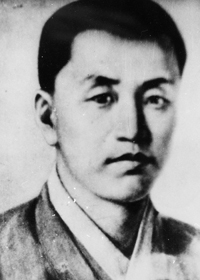
Yang Se-bong, 2nd commander-in-chief of the Korean Revolutionary Army

==== Korean Revolutionary Army ====
Hyeon Ik-cheol established the Korean Revolutionary Party and placed the Korean Revolutionary Army under the Military Committee of the National People's Government. The Korean Revolutionary Army greatly reorganized the organization on December 20, 1929, to concretely realize the party's ideology. Through this reorganization, the Korean Revolutionary Army appointed Lee Jin-tak as the commander-in-chief, Yang Se-bong as the deputy commander, and Lee Ung as the chief of staff and organized the existing ten units into seven units. When Yang Se-bong was assassinated, the Korean Revolutionary Party dissolved along with the prefecture in November 1934, and the Korean Revolutionary Army Government was established by integrating the National People's Prefecture and the Korean Revolutionary Army. It became active until 1937.

=== Korean National Revolutionary Party ===
==== Korean National Revolutionary Party Army ====
Flag of the Korean National Revolutionary Party

The Korean National Revolutionary Party Army was a military force established by the Korean National Revolutionary Party in the mid-1920s, a nationalist political party closely associated with the Provisional Government of the Republic of Korea. The organization was composed mainly of Korean exiles living in China but included some Chinese and foreign fighters. About 200 of its soldiers stayed behind in Manchuria.

==== Korean Volunteer Corps ====
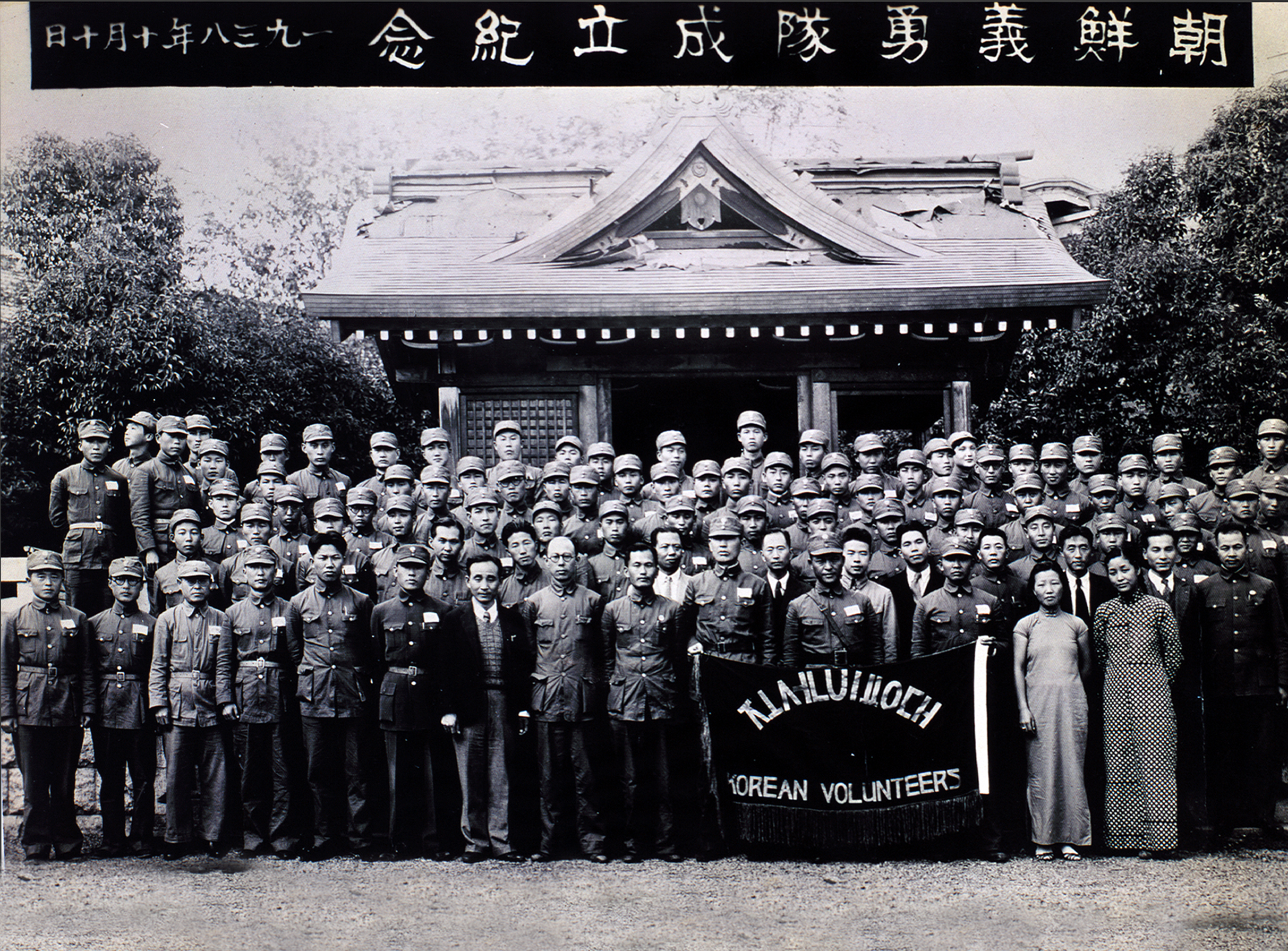
Joseon Volunteer Corps (1938)

The KNRP established the Korean Volunteer Corps as its military organization in October 1938, which, in practice, was controlled by the Chinese National Military Council. The Joseon Volunteer Corps was launched not as a combat unit but as an armed political propaganda unit. For China, the Anti-Japanese War was a 'war of justice', a military struggle and resistance against the invaders. China attempted to make up for its military inferiority through moral superiority, and the Joseon Volunteer Corps was established with the mission of propaganda against the Japanese army and against the Chinese such as the Korean Volunteer Corps News. They carried out guerrilla warfare, and since there were many members who could speak Korean, Chinese, and Japanese, they were in charge of propaganda work, distributing leaflets to the Japanese military and making broadcasts using loudspeakers. This did not change even after they moved to the Eighth Route Army area, and it was not until August 1945 that they were reorganized into a combat unit, and at the end of 1945, they entered Manchuria and expanded into a combat unit. In the summer of 1941, some members of the KNRP and the Korean Volunteers Corps, rendezvoused with the Chinese Communist Party in Northwestern China.

== Armies of the Socialist Parties ==
=== Korean Socialist Party ===
==== Korean Red Guards ====
The Korean Socialist Party formed their own Red Guards led by Yi Dong-hwi consisting of 100 infantrymen.

==== Korean Democratic Corps ====
The Korean Democratic Corps (대한 신민단; 大韓 新民團), was a Protestant-affiliated armed independence movement group led by Director Kim Gyu-myeon. They have two branches, Wangcheong-hyeon led by Kim Jun-geun and Park Seung-gil, and Honchun-hyeon led by Commander Han Gyeong-se. To strengthen the military, rifles, pistols, and ammunition were purchased with military funds collected from North Hamgyong Province, Gando, and Russian territory, and armed about 500 independence fighters.

In April 1919, the corps merged with the Korean Socialist Party (대한신민단; 大韓新民團) at the second representative congress of Korean Socialist Party. They assisted Hong Beom-do in the Battle of Fengwudong and the Battle of Cheongsanri. Afterwards, Kim Seong-bae was dispatched as a representative of the Korean People's Assembly to a rally for the formation of the Korean Independence Corps held in Mirsan in December, but it did not achieve any significant results.

As the Free City Incident occurred and Japan's ruthless campaign to sweep away independence forces unfolded, the Honchun branch, along with the Wangcheong branch, went into exile and moved to Noryeong. Afterwards, while working for military training and promoting independence ideology, in December 1922, the Lenin government notified of the order of disbandment and disarmament. As a result, it split into the Jaeso faction of Han Gyeong-se and Moon Seong-ryong and the Manchurian faction of Kim Gyu-sik, and in retaliation against the Soviet Union, Kim Gyu-sik killed three Soviet soldiers. As a result of this incident, Han Gyeong-se and Moon Seong-ryong were arrested and imprisoned, and the Jaesopa group was disbanded. And Kim Gyu-sik's group escaped to Manchuria and attempted to resume the independence movement, but it was soon disbanded.

== Armies of the Communist Parties ==
=== Korean Communist Party ===
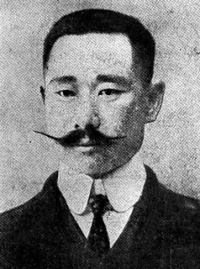
Yi Dong-hwi, leader of the Red Guards of the Korean Socialist Party and the Sakhalin Volunteer Corps of the Shanghai faction of the Korean Communist Party.

Yi Dong-hwi, Kim Lip, and others from the Korean Socialist Party formed a temporary organization called the Korean Communist Party in Shanghai around May 1920. However, the communist organizations conflicted with the party's leadership due to ideological differences. Therefore, two factions were formed within the party with their armed units.

==== Korean Communist Party's Shanghai faction ====
The armed units of this faction are as follows:

- Nihang Army: Led by Park Il-ya, was named because it was based in Nikolayevsk Port. Park renamed his unit the Sakhalin Volunteer Corps.
- Davan Army: Led by Nikolai Choi, was named after its formation in Davan, a Korean village in Khabarovsk.

==== Korean Communist Party's Irkutsk faction ====
The armed units of this faction are as follows:

- Freedom Battalion: A Korean partisan unit became a special Korean infantry battalion belonging to the Far East Republic. Oh Ha-muk was the commander and the garrison was in Free City. It was absorbed by the Korean Revolutionary Military Government Council's Korean Revolutionary Army.
- Korean Independence Army: Organized in 1919 in Bongo-dong, Wangcheong-hyeon, Manchuria. Their Commander Hong Beom-do.

=== Korean People's Revolutionary Army ===
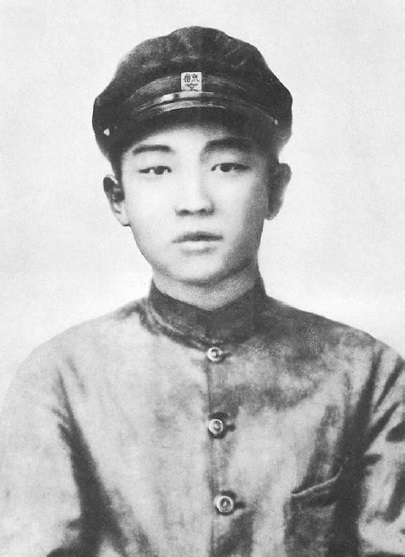
Kim in 1927, portrait published in his autobiography With the Century

Kim Il Sung's anti-Japanese guerrilla army, the Korean People's Revolutionary Army, was established on 25 April 1932. The workers, farmers, and young students serve as the core of this army. North Korea claims that it was the first "self-revolutionary force" established by Kim Il-sung, known as the "Anti-Japanese Guerrilla Unit," and was initially referred to as the "Anti-Japanese People's Guerrilla Unit." So the KPRA was also the name for Korean units of the Northeast Anti-Japanese United Army. According to North Korea, the purpose of this organization, in relation to the Korean People's Revolutionary Army, was to "struggle for the people's interests guided by the Juche idea" and "eliminate all class oppression and exploitation and build socialism".

According to North Korea's official stance, the formation process of the Korean People's Revolutionary Army can be traced back to Kim Il-sung's leadership in presenting a self-reliant anti-Japanese armed struggle line during the Karun Conference held in Jangchunhyeon, Karun, in the summer of 1930. In July of the same year, they established the Korean Revolutionary Army as the first armed organization of the Communists. At the Myeongwol Conference on December 19, 1931, they presented a strategic policy for organizing armed struggles based on guerrilla warfare and declared the establishment of the "Anti-Japanese People's Guerrilla Unit" as a permanent revolutionary force on April 25, 1932, in Sajahwa, Muzutong, Saho, Ando, China, with the Korean Revolutionary Army members, supporters of the Karun Conference, and anti-Japanese people as its core. Subsequently, they further strengthened the leadership and political guidance of the guerrilla unit and reorganized the military command, management system, and rear security system. In March 1934, they transformed the "Anti-Japanese People's Guerrilla Unit" into the Korean People's Revolutionary Army. Kim Il-sung identified the Korean People's Revolutionary Army as the core of the Party, state, and military establishment, recognizing it as the key to the establishment of the party, the country, and the military in the northern region of Korea, based on the three major tasks of nation-building, state-building, and military-building for the new country, which he proposed to Korean leaders on August 20, 1945, at a Soviet camp. North Korea also claims that Kim Il-sung enhanced and developed the Korean People's Revolutionary Army into the regular military force, the Korean People's Army, on February 8, 1948, in preparation for the establishment of the North Korean government.

=== Sixth division ===
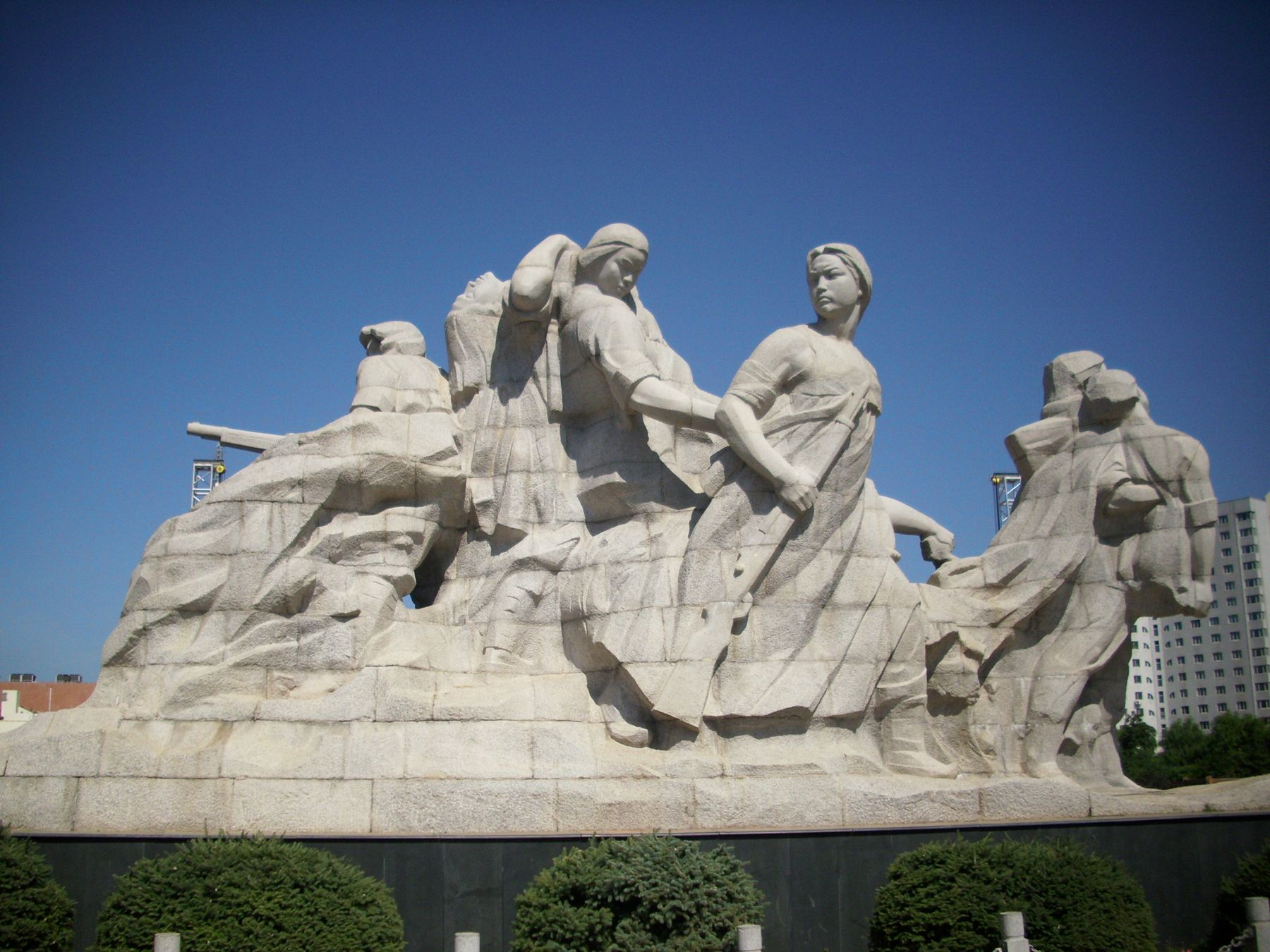
The statue "Eight Girls Jumping Into the River" located in Mudanjiang City

The Sixth Division of the Second Army of the First Route Army of the Northeast Anti-Japanese United Army led by Kim Il-Sung in 1937 which came to be known as "Kim Il Sung's division" consisted of a few hundred men. They crossed the Manchurian-Korean border and attacked a Japanese police station in Pochonbo at 1937. It was widely reported by Korean newspapers such as Donga Ilbo and he became famous in Korea as the most prominent leader of the anti-Japanese movement in the northern half. After the war, some of the Korean nationals in this army became the first generation of the leaders of North Korea. Besides Kim Il Sung, An Gil, Kim Chaek, Choe Yong-gon, and Kang Kon, among others who later became part of North Korea's politics and military forces, were also Korean general officers of the NAJUA.

=== Eight Girls Jumping Into the River ===
Two of the legendary "Eight Girls Jumping Into the River" were Korean Chinese. This was a squad of girl guerrillas, aged 13 to 23; after a long firefight with overwhelming Japanese force who mistook them for a much larger unit, they all jumped into the river, drowning themselves to avoid capture and torture.

== Military offices, associations, and commands ==
=== Korean National Association ===
Park Yong-man was elected as the Korean National Association's vice chairman, and preferred military action to liberate Korea.

==== Korean National Army Corps ====
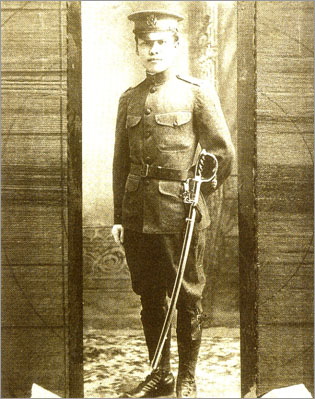
Park Yong-man, founder of the Korean National Army Corps

On August 29, 1914, Park Yong-man founded the Korean National Army Corps in Hawaii as part of the Korean National Association to train officers for the Korean Independence Movement. The military academies were also called 'soldier academies,' where soldiers stayed in the corps, received military training and study, and at the same time went out to work on farms, while also conducting military training and learning in their spare time under the Garrison Farming Troop System (Dunjeonbyeong (屯田兵制)). The organization, which started with about 100 people, grew to a maximum of 300 people. The corps students received military training outdoors and studied military science in classrooms. Military education was conducted using wooden rifles. However, due to the pressure from the alliance between the Japanese Empire and the United States during World War I and the poor harvests and recession, they were forced to close down.

==== Willows Korean Aviation School ====
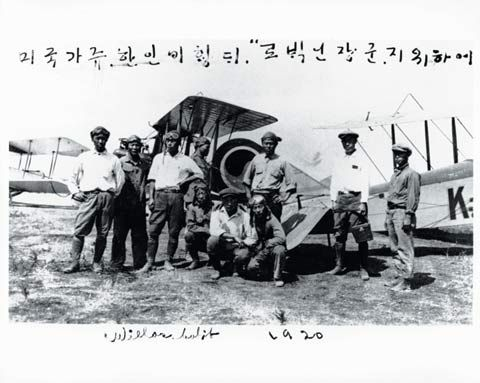
Pilots of the Willows Flight School in the 1920s.

Willows Korean Aviation School (대한인비행가양성소) was an aviation school meant to train fighter pilots for the Korean Independence Movement, many of whom were members of the Korean National Association. It was established on February 20, 1920, in Glenn County, California, by Korean-Americans and backed by the Korean Provisional Government in Shanghai. The choice for a Korean Aviation School to be established in California was for multiple reasons including the March 1st movement, interest and financial support from the Korean American community, the impact of World War I on aviation for combat and defensive purposes, and Japan's inability to control or influence the school on US soil. Although the school lasted until April 1921, it had gained a lot of attention and trained many of the pioneers of Korean aviation, including Park Hee-sung, Lee Yong-keun, and Song Yi-kyun. Two of its graduates went on to join the Republic of Korea Air Force, which recognizes the Willows Korean Aviation School as its predecessor.

=== Gando National People's Association ===
The Gando National People's Association, which actively accepted the command of the Provisional Government, was active in the unification of independence army units in eastern Manchuria. Accordingly, the Gando National Association organized its own army called the National Army under the command of Cho An-mu (安武) in the spring of 1920. A membership fee of 3 won was collected from each member and used as military funds.

==== National Army ====
This army has 450 troops. The 1st company commander was Jo Kwon-sik, the 2nd company commander was Lim Byeong-geuk, and the military affairs committee members were Ma Ryong-ha, Ma Cheon-ryong, Lee Won, and Choi Ki-hak. Choi Yeo-jin) and others. The headquarters of the National Army was near Chunheungchon. A military academy was established in Myeongwol-gu, Yanji County, Manchuria. The Gando National Association would perform its role as an administrative agency for the Korean Northern Army Command and provide all military affairs.

The Gando National Association mainly raised military funds and organized about 300 independent armed forces trained under the guidance of Cho An-Mu and 600 people under Hong Beom-do into the Korean Independence Army under the direct control of the National Association and placed them under the leadership of Hong Beom-do. In addition, armed groups throughout Gando were integrated and joint assistance was provided in purchasing weapons and training independent forces.

After the Battle of Cheongsanri, the Imperial Japanese Army sought revenge over the previous defeats by inciting the Gando Massacre causing the Gando National Association to dissolve. The National Army joined the Korean Independence Corps at Mt. Milsan representing the Korean and Huncheon Korean National Associations, and established a base in Free City, Russia. However, the Soviet Red Army incited the Free City Incident forcing the groups to disband, and helped Koo Chun-seon and other executives established the National Association Military Department in Dunhua. The National Army survived and in December 1921, it was renamed the 'Central General Inspectorate of the Communist Party of Korea' to strengthen the Shanghai faction of the Korean Communist Party.

=== Military Affairs Command ===
It is also called Dodokbu and Dokgunbu. The Military Affairs Command was organized in 1919 by Choi Jin-dong in Bongui-dong, Wangqing County, Manchuria. At the time of formation, there were about 600 troops, and they were organized with Park Young as chief of staff, Lee Chun-seung as battalion commander, Dong-chun Lee as company commander, and Choi Moon-in as platoon commander. This organization, in alliance with Hong Beom-do's Korean Independence Army, developed an active domestic entry operation. In 1920, Anmu's National Association Army and Hong Beom-do's Korean Independence Army formed the Allied Command, and the total military strength exceeded 1,000. From the spring of 1920, this combined unit mainly attacked the Japanese army in Hamgyeongbuk-do, along the Tumen River, and achieved great results. After the Battle of Cheongsan-ri in October 1920, Choi Jin-dong's unit, which crossed over to Primonsky Krai, and suffered a cataclysmic disaster due to the betrayal of the Soviet Army.

=== Righteous Army Command ===
The Righteous Army Command (의군부) was a monarchist independence movement group organized in Manchuria in 1919. Their military foundation was based on the former Righteous Army fighters who escaped to Manchuria after failing to retake Seoul from the Japanese Empire. They advocated for the restoration of the Joseon dynasty or the Korean Empire which puts them at ideological odds with the republicans and the socialists. They were known for fighting alongside militant independence groups at several major battles against the Japanese.

Many were former righteous armies. They carried out active activities such as attacking the Japanese invasion agencies through domestic campaigns with abundant practical combat experience. The armed group is headed by a battalion leader, Lee Heo Eun, Unit Commander Kang Chang-dae (姜昌大), Chief of Staff Park Jae-nul (朴載訥), Chief of Staff Go Pyeong (高平), Treasurer Kang Yeong-chan (姜永贊), Military Police Commander Choi Sang-un (崔相云), and Military Discipline Director Kang Mun-ju (姜文柱). The number of troops was about 200 people. The 180 people led by Lee Heo Eun were organized into the 1st Battalion of the Korean Northern Army Command. The military branch headquarters is based in a remote location, Buk-gu, Yeonhwa-dong, Wangwu-gu, Uiran-hyang, Yanji County, Goseongchon.

They focused on armed activities and were organized into a more straightforward organization in consideration of mobility. They also raise military funds in the Yeongdoje area. At one time, they were under the jurisdiction of the Korean Unification Government. Kim Cheong-bong (金淸鳳), Kim Hyeon-gyu (金鉉圭), and others took the lead and organized it in April of that year. It was strengthened to 6 battalions in 1 year and two months. They carried out active activities such as attacking the Japanese agencies through domestic campaigns with abundant practical combat experience. They attacked Cheongseong-jin, Uiju-gun, North Pyongan Province, raided and destroyed the police substation, customs branch office, and post office, and engaged in a fierce battle with the Japanese police. Eventually they withdrew from the government to establish themselves as an autonomous organization, but due to the rise in democracy and socialism their power waned and they disbanded to joined the other autonomous organizations.

=== Korean Northern Army Command ===
On May 3, 1920, the Korean Independence Army, the National Army, the Korean Democratic Corps, and the Military Affairs Office were allied to establish the Korean Northern Army Command (대한북로독군부; 大韓北路督軍府; Daehan Bungnodokgunbu). The base was located in Fengwudong, Wangqing County. Korean Northern Army Command held a joint military operation with other Korean military and resistance forces in Wangchunhyeon Poomdong. Also located there were the Military Affairs Command led by Choi Jin-dong, Korean Independence Army led by Hong Beom-do, National Army led by Cho An-mu, and the Korean Democratic Corps led by Kim Gyu-moon. The Korean Northern Army Command orchestrated many of the subsequent activities, specifically being in charge of administration, politics, and finances.

The base was commanded by Commander Choi Jin-dong, Adjutant Officer Ahn Mu, Bukro 1st Army Headquarters and Military Commander Hong Beom-do became the head of the Korean Northern Army Command and was in charge of the military forces. The Korean rebels were assembled into four companies under the leadership of Yi Cheon-oh, Kang Sang-mo, Kang Si-beom, and Jo Kwon-dong. The 700 combined corps of Lee Won's Unit won a great victory from June 4 to 7, 1920 in the Battle of Samdunja and the Battle of Bongo-dong, inflicting 157 enemy casualties, 120 seriously injured, and 100 lightly wounded.

On June 4, 1920, the army, which was led by Park Seung-gil, entered Jaseong County, Korea and ambushed Samdungja and attacked a Japanese army patrol. In retaliation, the Japanese army occupied Nanam-dong (now Cheongjin) in North Hamgyeong-do of the Japanese 19th Division headquarter base. By June 7, the Daehan Independence Army, National Association Army, Doron Ministry of Military, and the Shinmin Corps had defeated the battalion of 19th Division of the Japanese Army in Bong-o-dong and won the great victory. On July 8, Hong and his forces surprised and defeated the Japanese police who were searching for the independence forces in that area.

=== General Camp of the Liberation Army ===
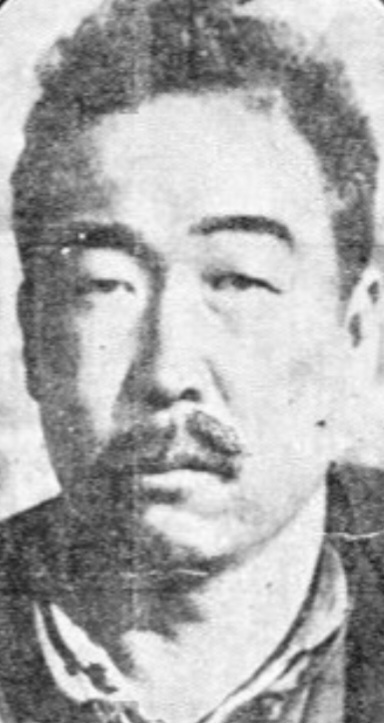
Oh Dong-jin, commander of the General Camp of the Liberation Army.

The General Camp of the Liberation Army (광복군총영) was a regional command under the Military Affairs Department of the Provisional Government of the Republic of Korea which was organized in Sangando, Andong Province in 1920 and led by Oh Dong-jin. It was formed by integrating the Republican Independence Corps with the Liberation Corps as its core, and it had a different founding entity from the Liberation Army Command, which the Provisional Government of the Republic of Korea intended to establish in Sangando. Prior to the organization of the Liberation Army Command, the General Camp of the Liberation Army had already been established, and thus, the Sangando regional command of the Provisional Government of the Republic of Korea was under the responsibility of the General Camp of the Liberation Army. The main camp was divided into four parts: the General Camp, Provincial Camps, County Camps, and Separate Camps.

As a military organization under the Provisional Government, the General Camp of the Liberation Army, which carried out anti-Japanese warfare, engaged in 78 skirmishes with the Japanese military and police in 1920, raided 56 Japanese military posts, burned down myeon offices and Yeongrimchang in 20 locations, and killed 95 Japanese police officers. Notable attacks include the Pyeongyang Bomb Squad and the Infiltration operations.

In 1922, when the unification organization of the independent armed groups in Sangando was established as the Korean Unification Government, the General Camp of the Liberation Army was dismantled as part of the progressive development.

=== Northern Military Administration Office ===
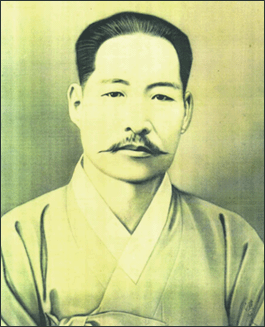
Kim Chwa-chin, commander of the Northern Military Administration Office and the Korean Independence Army

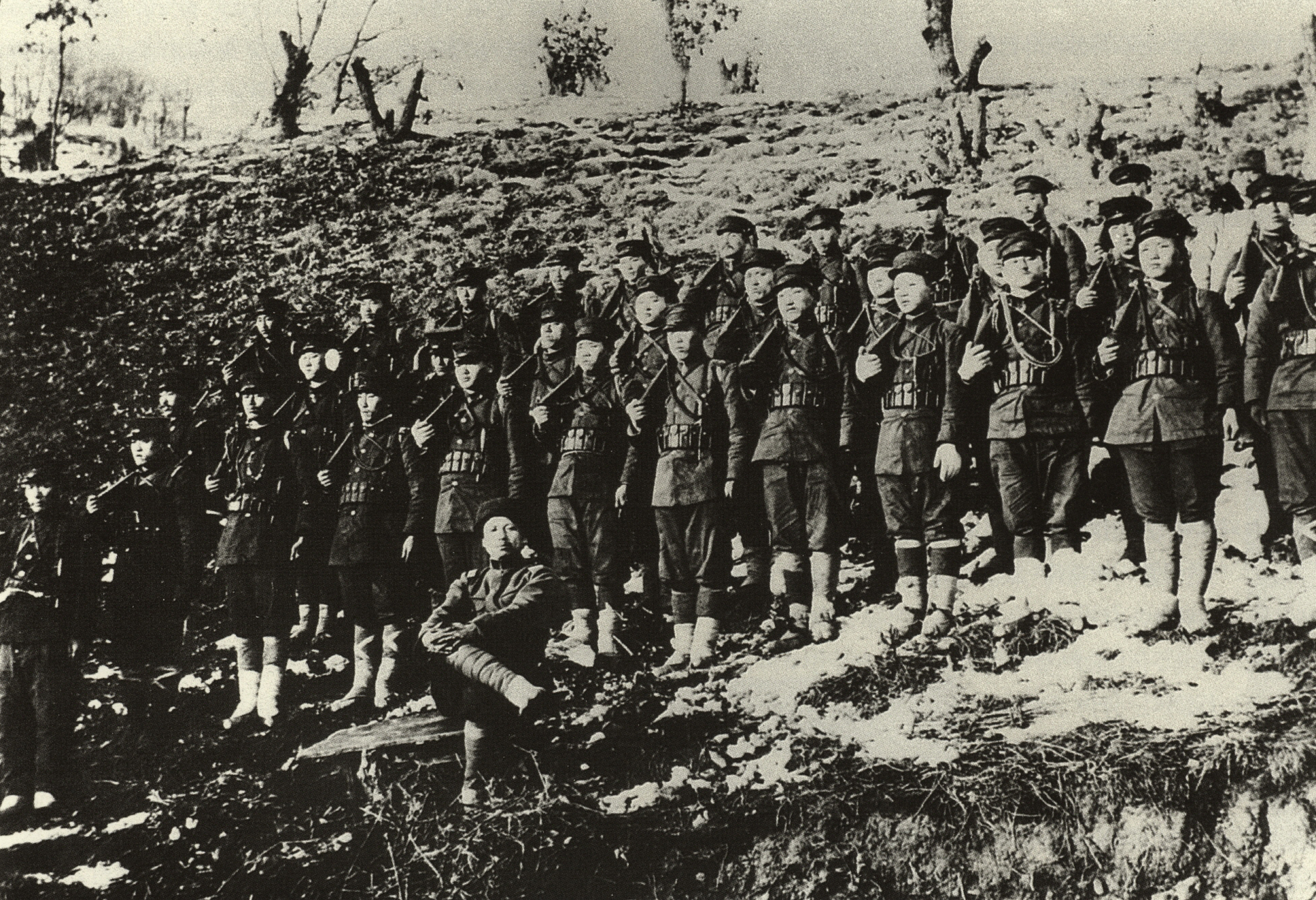
Commemorative photo of the Northern Military Administration Office troops after the Battle of Qingshanli

In October 1919, under the leadership of Daejonggyo and New People's Association, Korean Righteous Corps, and Military Administration Association were merged and reorganized into Northern Military Government. In December of that year, the Provisional Government in Shanghai agreed on the condition that the name be changed to Northern Military Administration Office. The officers at the time of the reorganization of the Northern Military Administration Office were President Seo Il and Commander-in-Chief Kim Jwa-jin.

The armies under the office were organized into battalions. The size of the troops was 500 in the early days, but in August 1920, it exceeded 1,600, and it became the strongest elite unit in Northeast Manchuria armed. Operating funds were covered by local residents or collected from domestic sources. They set up the base in the forest area of about 30 acres in the area of Seodaepasimnipyeong in Wangqing County and built 8 barracks to establish a military academy. They requested help from Shinheung Military Academy, and were supplied with various teaching materials and a number of officers, citizens and young people coming from home were selected and full-scale military training was conducted. In the 6-month accelerated course, subjects such as mental education, history, military science, arts, gymnastics, and rules and regulations were set as subjects, and military training was conducted based on the old Korean military style. In June 1920, out of 600 men who completed basic training, only 300 went into full-scale military training wearing gray military uniforms. In addition to military training, Gunjeongseo not only cooperated with independent movement organizations in Noryeong and Gando, but also served as a contact center for independence activists in northern Manchuria. While paying attention to local administration, elementary schools, night schools, and training centers were established, while promoting convenience in local industries.

=== Korean Righteous Military Administration Office ===
In October 1910, Lee Gyu and his followers consisting of graduates of military service schools and volunteer soldiers crossed over into Manchuria following the occupation. When the March 1st Movement broke out, the former Korean soldiers, volunteer soldiers, and Righteous armies who had been waiting organized the Great Korean Righteous Party and elected Lee Gyu (李圭) as its president. On October 23, 1919, they reported their name to the Provisional Government of the Republic of Korea in Shanghai, the organization changed their name to the Korean Righteous Military Administration Office under the name of President Lee Gyu (李圭). This group maintained close contact with other armed groups, from 1920, the tactics of Jo Dong-sik, head of the training department, they spread their power throughout Manchuria. In addition, newspapers and magazines were published to promote education and national spirit.

The number of troops belonging to this military government was about 900 in October 1919. 500 people were stationed under the name of the Chinese Security Corps, and 100 of them were dispersed and deployed to Naedosan Mountain. At the Sosaha Training Center, about 240 village youth members were undergoing training and placed in the Xiaoshahe region. About 100 troops were stationed in Gilsang River, Hwajeon County. In addition, hundreds of hunters were deployed in all directions, making it an independence struggle unit with considerable military power.

In August 1920, the Japanese army retreated to Yeongan-hyeon (寧安縣) due to the Battle of Qingshanli. Ultimately, in December of that year, they joined with the other resistance groups gathered on Mt. Mirsan to form the Korean Independence Corps. In December 1920, the office joined Kim Jwa-jin's unit and Ji Cheong-cheon's unit in Bukhagu County, Ando-hyeon, to form the Korean Volunteer Army But was short-lived when the factions of the Korean Communist Party vied for control over the corps. The Korean Volunteer Army sided with the Sakhalin Volunteer Corps of the Korean Communist Party against the Irkutsk Faction and the Korean Revolutionary Army causing the Soviet Red Army to intervene and order their disarmament with minimal resistance causing Korean Independence Corps to disarm and disband.

=== General Staff Headquarters ===
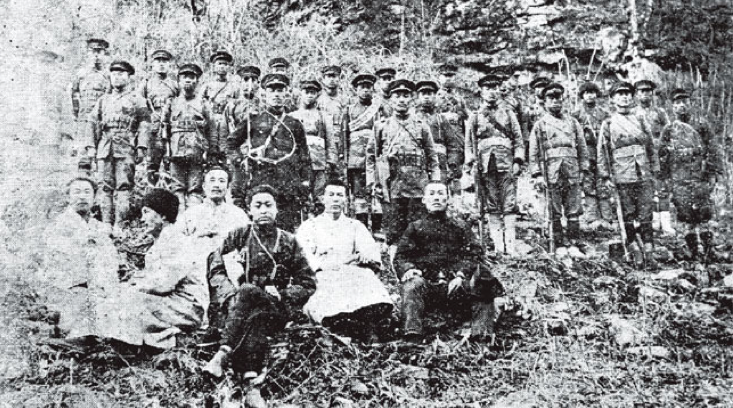
Members of the Provisional Government of the Republic of Korea Army's General Staff Headquarters

The General Staff Headquarters, also known as the General Staff Headquarters in Manchuria of the Provisional Government of the Republic of Korea, or the General Staff Headquarters in Manchuria, was a militant Korean independence organization under the direct control of the Provisional Government of the Republic of Korea, organized in 1924 in Jianhyeon, Manchuria. The General Staff Headquarters, which received formal approval from the Provisional Government on June 26, 1924, included each prefecture in Jian, Fusong, Changbai, Ando, Tonghwa, and Yuhwa. The General Staff Headquarters carried out an anti-Japanese campaign under the jurisdiction of the Korean community living in. While striving for the stability of life, economic development, and education of Koreans residing in Manchuria, the General Staff Headquarters also sought to gain independence by developing an anti-Japanese movement.

It was largely divided into central organization and local organization. The central organization was responsible for overseeing the organization. The local organization was organized under the jurisdiction of the Korean community along the Yalu River. After its establishment, it actively carried out operations to enter the country through guerrilla warfare. In addition, civil affairs activities were carried out to protect and govern the Korean community within the jurisdiction. After 1928, there was division over the direction of the independence movement, and its power weakened to the point of joining the National People's Prefecture.

== Bibliography ==
- The Korean Independence Movement in the United States (PDF).
- Behr, Edward (1987). The Last Emperor. New York: Bantam Books. ISBN 0-553-34474-9. OCLC 489010018.
- Gelderloos, Peter (2010). "How will decisions be made?". Anarchy Works. San Francisco: Ardent Press. pp. 48–66. OCLC 748435918.
- Hirsch, Steven; van der Walt, Lucien (2010). "Rethinking Anarchism and Syndicalism: the Colonial and Postcolonial Experience, 1870–1940". Anarchism and Syndicalism in the Colonial and Postcolonial World, 1870–1940. Studies in Global Social History. Vol. 6. Leiden: Brill. pp. xxxi–lxxiii. ISBN 978-90-04-18849-5. ISSN 1874-6705. OCLC 1200925424.
- Hwang, Dongyoun (2016). "Experimenting Place-Based Anarchism in Manchuria". Anarchism in Korea: Independence, Transnationalism, and the Question of National Development, 1919-1984 (PDF). Albany, New York: SUNY Press. pp. 48–55. ISBN 978-1-4384-6167-0. OCLC 1039293708.
- Ki-Rak, Ha (1986). History of the Korean anarchist movement (PDF). Taegu: Anarchist Publishing Committee. OCLC 937149346.
- MacSimoin, Alan (2002) [1991]. The Korean Anarchist Movement. Braamfontein: Zabalaza. OCLC 999512376.
- Schmidt, Michael (2013). Cartography of Revolutionary Anarchism. Edinburgh: AK Press. ISBN 9781849351386. OCLC 881111188.
- Schönherr, Johannes (2012). North Korean Cinema: A History. London: Mcfarland. ISBN 978-0-7864-6526-2.

== Sources ==
- Chang, Edward T.; Han, Woo Sung (2015). Korean American Pioneer Aviators: The Willows Airmen. Lexington Books. ISBN 978-1-4985-0265-8.
- Chong-Sik Lee (1963), The Politics of Korean Nationalism, University of California Press, GGKEY:YLWLRED8L47
- Kenneth M. Wells (1995), South Korea's Minjung Movement: The Culture and Politics of Dissidence, University of Hawaii Press, ISBN 978-0-8248-1700-8
- Xiaoyuan Liu (2002-07-25), A Partnership for Disorder: China, the United States, and Their Policies for the Postwar Disposition of the Japanese Empire, 1941-1945, Cambridge University Press, ISBN 978-0-521-52855-9
