= Sŏ Il =

Korean independence activist (1881–1921)

Sŏ Il 서일 徐一
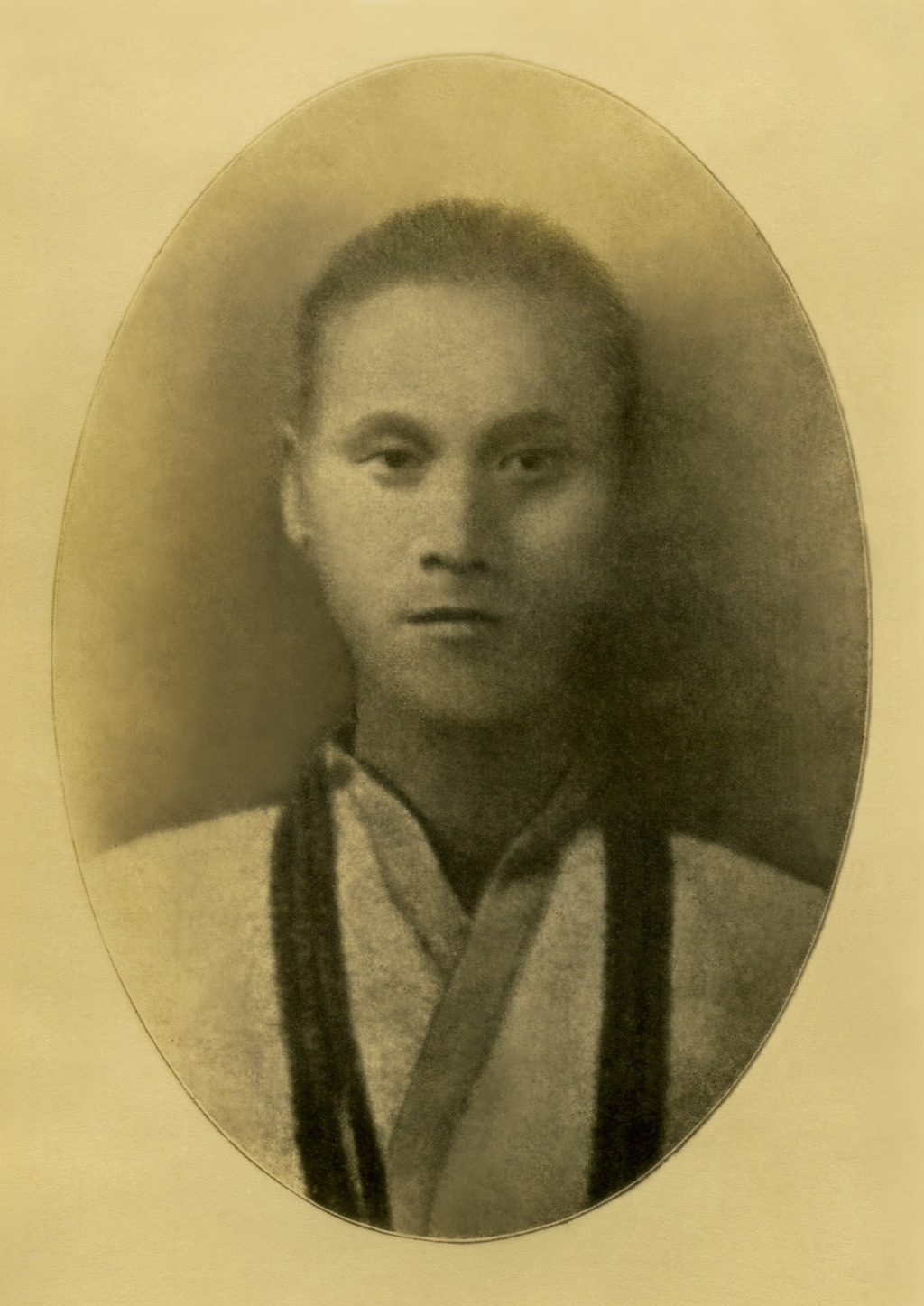
- Born: 26 February 1881; Icheon, Gyeongwon, North Hamgyong Province, Joseon
- Died: 27 June 1921 (aged 40); Unknown

Korean name
- Hangul: 서기학
- Hanja: 徐夔學
- RR: Seo Gihak
- MR: Sŏ Kihak

Art name
- Hangul: 백포
- Hanja: 白圃
- RR: Baekpo
- MR: Paekp'o

Pseudonym
- Hangul: 서일
- Hanja: 徐一
- RR: Seo Il
- MR: Sŏ Il

Sŏ Il (Korean: 서일; Hanja: 徐一; 26 February 1881 – 27 June 1921) was a Korean independence activist. He was a Daejonggyo priest that was credited for creating famous generals of the independence army, such as General Kim Chwajin, whom participated in the Battle of Cheongsanri while Sŏ Il served as the president of the Northern Military Administration Office and the Korean Independence Corps.

== Early life and activities ==
Born on February 26, 1881, in Kyongwon County, North Hamgyong Province, Joseon. His real name was Sŏ Kihak (서기학; 徐夔學) and his art name was Paekp'o (백포; 白圃). He entered Gyeongseong Yuji Uisuk, the predecessor of the Hamil School in Gyeongseong studying Chinese classics and graduated in 1902, and worked in education projects. He joined the New People's Association in 1907, and worked as a teacher until 1910. When Japan annexed Korea, he felt the difficulties of the anti-Japanese struggle at home and he went into exile in Manchuria crossing the Tuman River with his family in 1911 and established the Myeongdong School (明東學校) and Cheongil School (靑一學校). He also joined Daejonggyo, a national religion, and worked on missionary work to engage in full-scale anti-Japanese activities.

== Establishing the Chunggwangdan ==
In 1911, he created the organization Chunggwangdan, an independent corps centered on exiled volunteer soldiers entering Manchuria. He rallied the remaining troops of the volunteer army that crossed the Duman River and took office as its leader. He educated the members in anti-Japanese awareness and the doctrines of Daejonggyo, but was unable to take direct military action due to lack of weapons. He established Myeongdong Middle School (明東中學校) in the Jiandao region and engaged in educational work.

He joined Daejonggyo in 1912 and focused on the study of its doctrines and missionary activities. In 1916, he became a general lecturer at the head office and as a result of his activities, he became a member of Na Cheol's teachings. He was selected as a successor, was promoted to a shrine, and even rose to the rank of spiritual master. Rather than fighting by force, he focused on spiritual education on the doctrines of Daejonggyo teaching young comrades the national spirit and Chinese classics.

In 1916, he became a head priest of Daejonggyo and worked as a preceptor, becoming a priest and rising to the rank of Yeongseon.

In 1917, the headquarters of Daejonggyo was moved to Hwaryong-hyeon, Manchuria, and missionary activities were carried out to compatriots in Manchuria and Noryeong.

== Organizing Korean Justice Corps ==
In 1918 , seo, along with independence activists in Manchuria and Russian territories, issued an infallible declaration of independence with the intention of achieving national independence through a war with Yeo Jun, Yoo Dong-yeol, Kim Dong-sam, and Kim Jwa-jin.

In March 1919 , he and Gyehwa (桂和) reorganized the Junggwangdan into Korean Justice Corps (대한정의단(大韓正義團)) in order to become more active in the independence movement. Their goal was armed struggle, but at first they were only conducting military training, but in response to Kim Jwa-jin, they reorganized themselves into a combat posture, recruited members, and purchased weapons with the help of the Czech Legion, giving them the appearance of an independent army.

The leader of the Korean Justice Corps was Sŏ Il, and he also published the newspapers Ilminbo and Shingukbo. After August 1919, as independence movement groups in Manchuria began their armed struggle for independence, the Korean Justice Corps also decided to prepare for an armed struggle. The Korean Justice Corps combined with the Jilin Military Government, in which Kim Jwa-jin (金佐鎭, 1889-1930), Cho Seong-hwan (曺成煥), and Park Chan-ik (朴贊翊) were active, formed the Daehan Military Government in October 1919. The Daehan Military Government was organized. The president was Sŏ Il, and the commander was Kim Jwa-jin.

Around this time, Muwonjongsa Kim Gyo-Heon, the second-generation leader of Daejonggyo,tried to pass on the position of leader to him, transportation, but he refused for five years in order to focus on training the independence army and the armed resistance against Japanese imperialism first rather than work on Daejonggyo.

== Leader of the Northern Military Administration Office ==
In August, the Korean Justice Corps was reorganized and developed into an anti-Japanese organization with an armed independence army and a military government with an executive branch that took the entire region of North Jiandao as its administrative district. While working with Hyeon Cheon-muk, Kim Jwa-jin, Kim Gyu-sik, Lee Jang-nyeong, and Lee Beom-seok on military training, purchasing weapons, protecting the rights and interests of the Korean People's Association, mass negotiation, and planning a strategy for anti-Japanese struggle, in December he temporarily moved to Shanghai.

He worked on educational projects by establishing night classes and elementary schools throughout Manchuria. At the time, the majority of people under the jurisdiction of the Northern Military Government were Daejonggyo believers, making it easy to collect and raise military funds. And he organized a secret society called Jayu Gongdan (自由公團) centered on members of the Daejong Church in Gukjiga, Yangil-hyeon, and it is said that the number of members reached about 15,000.

In December, it was said that there cannot be two governments for one people, and based on this, Seo-Il took office and reorganized it into a military administration. He renamed the military government to Northern Military Administration Office. The office consisted of about 1,600 people, armed with weapons purchased from Russia, and established and trained military academies. In addition, they provided police affairs and information liaison in various places, promoted local industries, and established elementary schools and night schools in various places. He also worked on educational projects by establishing a training center. They established an information network in various places, maintained local security based on donations from Daejonggyo believers and military funds raised by Hamgyong residents, and was responsible for recruiting new soldiers and importing weapons.

In addition, he studied the doctrines of Daejonggyo in his spare time, devoted himself to monasticism, interpreted the doctrines in a modern way, devoted himself to writing, and engaged in missionary work. He established an officer training center in Simnipyeong (十里坪), Wangcheong-hyeon to train mid-level officers, and also focused on training projects by establishing night classes and elementary schools in various places.

== Leader of the Korean Independence Corps ==
Due to the Japanese army's major subjugation operation, the main force was moved to Dangbyeokjin (當壁鎭) in Mt. Misan County , North Manchuria. He organized the Korean Independence Corps by integrating various units such as the Korean Independence Army, National Army, Military Affairs Command, Righteous Army Command, and the Liberation Corps entered Milsan-hyeon.

He was elected their president and he organized three battalions with 3,500 men and, in an attempt to wage an anti-Japanese war again, moved them to Russia for military aid. He observed the situation and tried to raise his troops by implementing a military system, but his base was destroyed by an attack by domestic enemies.

=== Free City Incident ===
The Red Army (Bolsheviks) of the Soviet Union, who had secretly reached a compromise with the Japanese, along with the Korean Communist faction in Irkutsk, decimated the Korean Independence Army, which supported the Shanghai Provisional Government, gathered in the Russian city of Amur (Svobodny). Due to the infighting between the Irkutsk and Shanghai factions within the Korean Communist Party, the Red Army demanded the Korean Independence Corps to disarm and disband, but they refused.

On June 27, 1921, the 29th Regiment of the Free City Garrison, the 2nd Corps Cavalry Battalion, the Rakichin Sniper Regiment, and the Freedom Battalion mobilized and began disarming the Sakhalin troops which soon erupted into a battle. However, there was confusion among the Russian soldiers as they could not distinguish between the Sakhalin units and the Korean Independence Corps soldiers, and Russian soldiers. The mobilized Russian troops launched indiscriminate attacks against them inciting the Free City Incident causing the lives many young soldiers. The surviving troops of Lee Cheong-cheon, Oh Gwang-seon, and Cho An-mu were disarmed by the Red Army.

== Suicide ==
Faced with frustration, he sought to regroup, but on August 26 of the same year, while planning his resurgence at Mt. Milsan, he was once again attacked by enemy forces, putting not only himself but also the residents of the village he was staying in at risk of being burned alive. Dealt a fatal blow, he felt the weight of his responsibility as the leader of the independence army and ultimately chose to end his life the following day. On August 27, he traveled into the depths of the mountain forest and left behind these words:

"As the day fades and the road becomes impassable, where shall humanity find its path?"

— Sŏ Il, final words, August 26, 1921.

Using the Josikbeop (調息法) method, one of the Daejonggyo training method, he ended his life.

== Legacy ==
As an independence activist, his activities and leadership can be highly regarded as unrivaled. In addition, Daejonggyo revere him as a saint who systematized religious doctrines through philosophical logic and scientific proof.

== Family ==
- Wife: Surname of Ch'ae
  - Eldest daughter: Sŏ Mo (서모; 徐模, 1902–?)
  - Second daughter: Sŏ Chukch'ŏng (서죽청; 徐竹淸, 1906–?)
  - Son: Sŏ Yunje (서윤제; 1908-1969) Independence activist

== Awards ==
In 1962, he was posthumously awarded the Order of Merit for National Foundation.

== Works ==
=== Writings ===
- Lecture on the Five Great Jongji (五大宗旨 講演)
- Sam-il Shingo Lecture (三一神誥講義)
- Hoesamgyeong (會三經)

=== Books ===
- Lectures on the Five Great Jongjis
- Samil Shinhwa Lectures
- Three Questions and 1 Answer
- Gubyeonwonbangdo
- Hoesamgyeong (會三經)

== See also ==
- Korean independence movement
  - List of militant Korean independence activist organizations
  - List of Korean independence activists
