= Korean Communist Party =

1920–1922 international political party

- Leader: Yi Dong-hwi
- Founded: January 1920; 106 years ago
- Dissolved: 17 April 1922; 104 years ago
- Preceded by: Korean Socialist Party
- Ideology: Communism; Leninism; Left-wing nationalism
- Political position: Left-wing to far-left
- International Organization: Comintern
- Slogan: Workers of all countries, unite!

- Korean Communist Party
- Hangul: 고려공산당
- Hanja: 高麗共産黨
- RR: Goryeo gongsandang
- MR: Koryŏ kongsandang

The Korean Communist Party (Korean: 고려공산당) was a communist political party organized in Shanghai, China and Irkutsk, Russia in 1921. It has its origins in the Siberian region after the Russian Revolution. It dissolved in 1922.

== Background ==
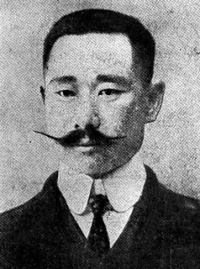
Yi Dong-hwi

It was an organization that followed communism. The Korean communist movement originally arose in Siberia after the Russian Revolution. The Korean Socialist Party was organized in Khabarovsk in May 1918, and the 'Irkutsk Korean Communist Party Branch', the Korean branch of the Russian Bolshevik Party at the time, was organized in Irkutsk on January 22, 1920. The former was represented by Yi Dong-hwi, and the latter was represented by Kim Cheol-hoon. Both were fundamentally passionate independence activists. However, the difference in constitution between the two organizations was that the former was a group of naturalized people from Western Siberia, while the latter was a group of naturalized people from Eastern Siberia. The former's purpose was to rally Koreans in Siberia to the anti-Japanese movement, and the latter's purpose was to mobilize Koreans in western Siberia to the Bolshevik front.

== Formation ==
In 1919, the Provisional Government of the Republic of Korea was established in Shanghai. Yi Dong-hwi arrived in Shanghai at the end of August of that year and was inaugurated as the first Prime Minister of the Provisional Government of the Republic of Korea. Yi Dong-hwi formed a communist group in Shanghai in the spring of 1920 as the first step toward achieving independence with the help of the Soviet Union. This organization is centered around executives of the Korean Socialist Party.

Meanwhile, in Omsk, the Korean Department of the Omsk Communist Party was formed in November 1919, and in Irkutsk, the Korean Department of the Irkutsk Communist Party was organized in January 1920. As the function of overseeing the Korean socialist movement was transferred to the Korean Department under the Eastern Peoples Department of the Siberian Department of the Communist Party, Irkutsk became the center. The leadership of the Korean Department of the Irkutsk Communist Party consists of Advisor Boris Shumyatsky, Chairman Kim Cheol-hoon, Secretary General Yi Seong, Political Department Director Andrei Han, Propaganda Department Director Choi Go-ryeo, Military Department Director Oh Hamuk, and Transportation Director Park. (Park) Inogenchi, and 26 members of the central committee. This party became the limb of the Comintern's Oriental Secretariat, which dealt with the foreigners of Siberia. Communist education and military training were provided to Korean youth, and efforts were made to educate party members and the general public through political ideology and infiltrate Bolshevik policies through an organ called Gyeongsejong (警世鐘).

Yi Dong-hwi, Kim Rip, and others from the Korean Socialist Party formed a temporary organization called the ‘Korean Communist Party’ in Shanghai around May 1920. Meanwhile, in Irkutsk, the Central General Assembly of the Former Korean Communist Party was formed in July 1920. Both the Jaesang Korean Communist Party and the Central General Assembly of the Korean Communist Party were aiming to build a unified Communist Party organization, but they were in conflict with each other over the leadership in founding the Communist Party.

This party convened the first representative meeting of Korean communist organizations in Russia in Irkutsk in July 1920 and changed its name to the Former Korean Communist Party. Afterwards, the Korean Communist Congress was held from May 4 to 17, 1921, and another Korean Communist Party was formed to oppose Yi Dong-hwi's Shanghai faction Korean Communist Party. This is called the Irkutsk faction of the Korean Communist Party. Since this party is a joint communist party of forces that broke away from the Shanghai faction of the Korean Communist Party and the Irkutsk faction, all former executives of the former Koryo Communist Party resigned and Ahn Byeong-chan, Han Myeong-seo, Nam Man-chun, Han Gyu- seon, Jaebok Lee was elected as a member of the Central Executive Committee. However, on November 3 of that year, several sections of the party leadership, including Chairman Kim Cheol-hoon, Secretary General Han Andrei, Political Department Director Lee Seong, Propaganda Department Director Choi Choi-ryeo, Military Government Committee Chairman Oh Hamuk, and Transportation Department Director Park Ino Genchiro, were returned to the party leadership.

In December 1920, Kim Lip, who had transported Moscow funds to Shanghai, secretly stored this money instead of giving it to the Provisional Government. As a result of this incident, Yi Dong-hwi's prestige fell significantly, and the departure of Provisional Government officials from the communist group quickly surfaced. Yi Dong-hwi held a meeting on May 10, 1921. It was here that he finally decided to use Moscow funds for the communist movement. He also renamed the communist group the Goryeo Communist Party, and on the 23rd of that month adopted 12 amendments to the party's provisional chapter, 5 amendments to party discipline, and 5 clauses to party politics. Therefore, the Korean Communist Party Representative Meeting was convened in Shanghai in May 1921. Representatives from Korea, Manchuria, and Vladivostok participated. At this meeting, the election statement and platform regulations were adopted, and leadership was elected including Lee Dong-hwi as a member of the Central Committee, Central Committee members Kim Lip, Lee Han-yeong, Kim Man-gyeom, and Ahn Byeong-chan, Translation Associate Member Yeo Woon-hyung, and Publication Associate Member Jo Dong-ho. This party is called the Shanghai faction of the Korean Communist Party.

Separately, the founding convention of the Korean Communist Party was held in Irkutsk in May 1921. Held for 12 days from May 4, 1921, this conference was attended by 85 representatives from 26 organizations from Korea, Soviet Union, the Far East Republic, and China. Through this convention, another Korean Communist Party was formed. Kim Man-gyeom, Kim Cheol-hoon, Jang Geon-sang, Choi Choi-ryeo, and Han Myeong-se were elected as central committee members. Many Koreans who had naturalized in Soviet Russia participated in the Korean Communist Party formed in Irkutsk.

The ‘All-Korea Communist Party Congress’ was held in Shanghai for four days from May 20, 1921. About 30 representatives of Korean communist organizations from Korea, China, Manchuria, Japan, etc. participated in this competition, and through this competition, the 'Korean Communist Party' was formed. Yi Dong-hwi, Kim Lip, Park Jin-sun, Kim Cheol-soo, and Jang Deok-su were elected as central committee members.

== Factions ==
These two Korean Communist Parties were called ‘Shanghai Participant Korean Communist Party’ and ‘Irkutsk Participant Korean Communist Party’ after the names of the regions in which they were formed. The Shanghai faction and the Irkutsk faction were not only different in the regions in which they were formed, but also in the revolutionary theories they pursued. The Shanghai faction of the Korean Communist Party believed that a national revolution was necessary to escape colonial rule by Japan, and that it could then transition to a proletarian revolution. However, the Irkutsk faction of the Korean Communist Party believed that the construction of the Soviet Union through socialist revolution was necessary. Later, like the Shanghai School, it changed into a two-stage revolutionary theory, but its radical nature did not disappear. These differences in revolutionary theory were even more pronounced in the policies of the National Unification Front. Because the Shanghai faction of the Korean Communist Party prioritized national revolution, it was active in pursuing broad nationalist forces and a national united front. On the other hand, the Irkutsk-affiliated Korean Communist Party was passive toward the national unification front and was negative toward alliances with nationalist forces.

=== Shanghai faction ===
The Korean Socialist Party was formed by Yi Dong-hwi, Park Ae, and Jeon Il, with the support of Krastochekov, chairman of the Far East People's Committee, who was dispatched from the Bolshevik Party. At the time, the Korean Socialist Party was the only Korean Socialist (Communist) party recognized by the Comintern. Initially, it was a convenient communist organization for national liberation, but due to differences in policy with the members of the Provisional Government, it withdrew from the Provisional Government and was renamed the Korean Communist Party in May 1921.

The armed units of this faction are as follows:

- Nihang Army: Led by Park Il-ya, was named because it was based in Nikolayevsk Port. Park renamed his unit the Sakhalin Volunteer Corps.
- Davan Army: Led by Nikolai Choi, was named after its formation in Davan, a Korean village in Khabarovsk.

=== Irkutsk faction ===
Meanwhile, in Irkutsk on September 5, 1919, Kim Cheol-hoon (金哲勳), Oh Hamuk (吳夏默), etc., with the support of Sumiyasky, formed the Former Korean Communist Party. The All-Korean People’s Party was organized. This organization was made official on January 22, 1920 as the 'Irkutsk Communist Korean Department', a Korean branch of the Russian Bolshevik Party. Accordingly, the function of overseeing the Korean socialist movement was transferred from Omsk to the Korean Department under the Eastern Peoples Department of the Siberian Department of the Communist Party, and Irkutsk became the center.

The leadership of the Korean Department of the Irkutsk Communist Party consists of Advisor Boris Sumiyasky, Chairman Kim Cheol-hoon, Secretary General Lee Jae-bok (aka 李檉), Political Department Director Andrei Han, Propaganda Department Director Choi Go-ryeo, Military Department Director Oh Hamuk, There are 26 central committee members, including Minister of Transportation Park Inogenchi.

This party convened the first representative meeting of Koryo communist organizations in Russia in Irkutsk in July 1920 and changed its name to the Former Korean Communist Party. Afterwards, the Korean Communist Congress was held from May 4 to 17, 1921, and another Goryeo Communist Party was formed to oppose Yi Dong-hwi's Shanghai faction. This is called the Irkutsk faction.

The armed units of this faction are as follows:

- Freedom Battalion: A Korean partisan unit became a special Korean infantry battalion belonging to the Far East Republic. Oh Ha-muk was the commander and the garrison was in Free City.
- Korean Independence Army: Organized in 1919 in Bongo-dong, Wangcheong-hyeon, Manchuria. Their commander was Hong Beom-do.

=== Factional strife ===
The Shanghai faction and the Irkutsk faction, the Korean Communist Party, entered into a relationship of struggle, each claiming sole legitimacy and competing to approach the Soviet Union. The Shanghai faction expanded its power through alliances with Chinese and Japanese communists, domestic operations, and support for national armed groups. On the other hand, the Irkutsk faction expanded its influence by establishing a Shanghai branch, organizing the Shanghai Korean Communist Party, taking control of Korean military organizations in Russia, and working to turn Koreans into Bolsheviks in Russia.

== Dissolution ==
As the factional strife between the two factions became more severe, the Comintern recommended reconciliation and unification, but failed. The two sides entered into a struggle over the right to command Korean resistances forces. On June 28, 1921, the Sakhalin Volunteer Corps, supported by the Shanghai Faction, fought against the Irkutsk Faction, which had joined the Russian Red Army, in Surasekhka, but was surrounded and attacked by the 29th Regiment of the Russian Red Army, leaving 144 dead and missing and 864 survivors. The Soviet Union and the Far East General Directorate ordered the disbandment of all the factions in December 1922 to organize the Corburo under the Comintern. It consisted of Yi Dong-hwi and Yun Ja-young from the Shanghai faction, and Han Myeong-seo, Jang Geon-sang, and Kim Man-gyeom from the Irkutsk faction. It is as if the Comintern forced the two Korean Communist Party factions to merge into a unified Communist Party. The unprincipled factional strife between the Shanghai and Irkutsk factions had a negative impact not only on the early communist movement but also on the entire Korean Independence Movement.

== See also ==
- Korean Independence Movement
  - List of militant Korean independence activist organizations
    - Korean Independence Corps
- Communism in Korea
- Free City Incident
- Korean Revolutionary Party
  - Korean Revolutionary Army
- Communist Party of Korea

== Bibliography ==
- Baekbeom Ilji (白凡逸志)
- Mongyang Yeo Un-hyeong (Yeo Un-hong, Cheonghagak, 1967)
- Origins of the Korean Communist Movement』 (Scalapino and Lee Jeong-sik, Korean Research Library, 1961)
- Yaksan and Uiyeoldan (Park Tae-won, Baekyangdang, 1947)
- The Secret History of the Travels of the People of Joseon (坪江汕二, Iwanamdang Bookstore, 1966)
- 朝鮮獨立思想運movement and change (朝鮮總督府法務局, 1931)
- 高麗共産黨及全露共産黨梗槪 (朝鮮總督府警務局)
