= Korean Independence Corps =

1920–1924 Korean militant activist group

- Leader: Seo Il
- Founded: December 1920
- Dissolved: September 1924
- Country: Korea
- Allegiance: Provisional Government of the Republic of Korea
- Headquarters: Mt. Misan, Heilongjiang Province, China; Free City
- Ideology: Korean independence movement
- Size: 3,500

- Korean Independence Corps
- Hangul: 대한독립군단
- Hanja: 大韓獨立軍團
- RR: Daehan dongnip gundan
- MR: Taehan tongnip kundan

The Korean Independence Corps (Korean: 대한독립군단) was a militant Korean independence organization that united the Korean Independence armies until its dissolution after the Free City Incident, reorganization in Manchuria, and its final dissolution.

== Overview ==
As Japan launched a full-fledged attack following defeats such as the Battle of Cheongsanri and the Battle of Fengwudong, independence forces, including the Northern Military Administration Office, decided to move to the Maritime Province and prepare for a long-term anti-Japanese war, and in 1920. It is a joint unit that united the forces of the independence army in December at Milsan near the Sino-Soviet border.

== Background ==
At the request of the Chinese side, which could not overcome the pressure of Japan, the independence army units located in all parts of South and North Manchuria, especially in North Gando, moved to the direction of Milsan near the Sino-Soviet border to build a new anti-Japanese war base. In December 1920, under the leadership of the Bukrogunjeongseo, the Korean Independence Army, the Korean New People's Association, the Korean National Association headed by Gu Chun-seon, and the Korean National Association in Honchun, the Military Provincial Government Department, Representatives of the Uigunbu, Hyolseongdan, Yadan, and Daehanjeonguigunjeongsa crossed over to the Maritime Province to wage a long-term anti-Japanese war. Decided to prepare, he organized this group in Milsan, the Korean Independence Corps (Korean: 대한독립군단; Hanja: 大韓獨立軍團).

== Composition of the Korean Independence Corps ==
The ten Independence Army units gathered here were integrated and reorganized to form the Korean Independence Corps. The organizations incorporated into the Korean Independence Corps are as follows:

- Northern Military Administration Office: Organized in Bukgando, Manchuria, in 1919. Leading organization of the Korean Independence Corps. Daejonggyo branch. President Seo Il (徐一). Commander-in-Chief Kim Jwa-jin (金佐鎭). Division Commander Kim Kyu-sik.
- Korean Independence Army: Organized in Antu County and Bongodong, Wangqing County, Manchuria in 1919. Commander Hong Beom-do (洪範圖).
- Korean Democratic Corps: Organized in Vladivostok, Russia in 1919. Christian Methodist affiliate. Director Kim Gyu-myeon (金圭冕).
- North Gando National Association (大韓國民會): Organized in Pyongyang, South Pyongan Province in 1919. Protestant branch. Gu Chun-seon (具春先).
- Hunchun Korean National Association (琿春大韓國民會): Organized in 1919 in Honchun, Manchuria. Chairman Lee Myung-soon (李明淳).
- Military Affairs Command: Organized in 1919 in Bongui-dong, Wangqing County, Manchuria. Commander Choi Jin-dong (崔振東).
- Righteous Army Command: Organized in 1919 in Myeongwol-gu, Yanji County, Manchuria. President Beomyoon Lee (李範允).
- Patriotic Blood Corps (血誠團): Organized in Jinju, Gyeongsangnam-do in 1919. Director Kim Kuk-cho (金國礎).
- Field Corps (Yadan (野團)): Organized in Jilin, Manchuria in 1919. Cheonglimgyo (靑林敎), a branch of Donghak. The leader is Shinpo (申砲), also known as Asorae (我笑來).
- Korean Righteous Military Administration Office (大韓正義軍政司): Organized in Naedosan, Ando-hyeon, Manchuria in 1919. President Lee Gyu (李圭).

In addition to the above ten units, the Korean New People's Association dispatched Kim Seong-bae as a representative of the Korean New People's Association to Milsan in December to form the Korean Independence Corps, but there was no result.

== Organization ==
Seo Il (徐一) as president, Hong Beom-do (洪範圖) as vice president, Baek Soon (白純 and Kim Ho-ik) as advisors, Choi Jin-dong (崔振東) as foreign minister, Kim Jwa-jin (金佐鎭) as chief of staff, staff Lee Jang-nyeong and Na Joong-so as military advisers, Ji Cheong-cheon as a military advisor, Kim Gyu-sik as the 1st Brigade Commander, Park Yeong-hee as the Staff, Anmu as the 2nd Brigade Commander, and Staff Lee Dan-seung (李檀承), 2nd Brigade Cavalry Commander Kang Phillip, company commanders Kim Chang-hwan, Oh Gwang-seon (吳光鮮), and Jo Dong-shik (趙東植) were appointed.

There was a brigade as an upper unit under the corps, and under it, three battalions, nine companies, and 27 platoons were organized, and the total strength was about 3,500.

Paradoxically, the Korean Independence Corps became more desperate for support, including armament, clothing, and provisions, to maintain a large army.

== March to the Free City ==
In December of that year, They crossed the Heilong River and were stationed in the Russian Free City Srabske area. With the help of 500,000 Koreans and the Russian Red Army, they received weapons replenishment and sometimes participated in joint operations. Meanwhile, in February 1921, a military agreement was signed between the buffer government in Chita and the anti-Japanese independence army through the good offices of Ohamuk, a graduate of the Russian Military Academy who participated in the Russian Revolution. According to this military agreement, the independence army received weapons from them, established the Goryeo Revolutionary Military Academy (高麗革命軍官學校) to train the independence army, and participated in the subjugation of the Baekgye Army.

Knowing this, Japan launched a robust diplomatic offensive against the Russian government and demanded that it disarm. Meanwhile, Russia, anxious about domestic civil war after the revolution, was wary of discord with Japan and promised to disarm the Korean Independence Army. Accordingly, on June 22, 1921, the Russian authorities issued an order to the Korean independence forces stationed in Free City to disarm and, at the same time, attack and defeat the resisting independence forces, causing the Free City Incident. At this time, the Independence Army units suffered many casualties and suffered untold hardships, causing the Korean Independence Corps to disintegrate.

=== Gathering of Free City by unit (January to March 1921) ===
Unit that went to Free City Park Doo-hee (Bukrogunjeongseo): Misan → Iman → Jayusi Lee Dong-hwi linked unit: Misan → Iman → Jayusi Ji Cheong cheon Unit: Misan → Iman → Jayusi Hong Beom-do Unit: Misan → Iman → Jayusi Choreography unit: Misan → Iman → Jayusi

=== Units that did not go to Free City ===
Kim Jwa-jin (North Korean military sentiment): Milsan → Iman → retreat to northern Manchuria Other units (Lee Beom-seok, Kim Hong-il, etc.): Withdraw from Misan

== Reorganization ==
While moving to Free City, the units that did not respond to disarmament returned to Manchuria from Iman, Primorsky Krai (now Dalnerechensk Province, Primorsky Krai, Russia). Units that moved to Free City suffered the Heihe Incident (Yiqing) in the integration process. After the Heihe Incident, the remaining troops in Free City were reorganized into the Koryo Revolutionary Army. Afterward, the Koryo Revolutionary Army moved to Irkutsk.

After the Free City Incident in June 1921, the Korean Independence Corps was reorganized into several units as follows:

- Koryo Revolutionary Army (Ohamuk): 1921.8 Irkutsk, Irkutsk Province → Attached to the 5th Red Army.
- Korean Volunteer Military Association ( Use ): 1921.10 Iman-si, Primorsky Krai (Dalneretsensk) → Reorganized into the Red Army Special Infantry Battalion
- Korean Independence Corps (Lee Beom-yoon, Kim Jwa-jin): 1922.8 Dongnyeong County, Heilongjiang Province - Reorganization of remaining troops
- Jeokgidan (Choi Bongseol): 1923.1 Haesamwi, Primorsky Krai (Vladivostok) Shinhanchon
- Goryeo Revolutionary Army ( Kim Gyu-sik ): 1923.5 Yanji County, Jilin Province
- Korean Independence Military Statement ( Hyeon Cheon-muk ): 1924.3 Dongbin County, Heilongjiang Province (同賓縣)

Afterward, the Korean Independence Corps was reorganized in August 1922 by representatives of the Korean Military Government, Uigunbu, Hyeolseongdan, National Association, Korean Liberation Association, Daejindan, Korean Uimindan, Korean New People's Union, and Korean Independence Corps. Lee Beom-yoon was appointed as president, and Kim Jwa-jin was appointed as commander-in-chief.

Efforts to create an independent corps by integrating the units of the Anti-Japanese Independence Army continued. A preparatory meeting for the military federation was organized as part of these efforts in September 1924. Lee Beom-yoon (李範允) was appointed president, and Kim Jwa-jin was appointed commander-in-chief. Kim Gyu-sik, Choi Jin-dong, Hyeon Cheon-muk, Kang Guk-mo, Nam Sung-geek, Choi Ho, Park Doo-hee, Yoo Hyeon, Lee Jang-nyeong etc. actively Centering on Dongnyeong County in Manchuria, it expanded its influence along the Dongji line connecting Subunhe to Harbin.

== Final dissolution ==
They expanded their power centering on Manchuria. At this time, several independent army units were officially integrated into the Korean Independence Corps. Still, complete integration was not achieved due to poor finances and dispersed military forces.

Afterward, amid Japanese oppression of the independence Army, including the Mitsuya Agreement, the army reorganized its organization and continued the unification movement by establishing the Chamuibu, Jeonguibu, and Shinminbu. The Korean Independence Corps was an armed group that sought to unite the Korean community and simultaneously waged a desperate armed independence struggle against Japanese colonial rule, hoping to liberate the country through a war of independence. The Korean Liberation Army inherited this independence movement line. It was an energy source that drove the anti-Japanese movement during the Japanese colonial period.

== See also ==
- Korean Independence Movement
  - List of militant Korean independence activist organizations
- Free City Incident
