= Northern Military Administration Office =

1920–1921 Korean militant activist group

- Leader: Seo Il
- Founded: 1919
- Dissolved: 1921
- Country: Korea
- Allegiance: Provisional Government of the Republic of Korea
- Headquarters: Donggandao, Jilin Province, Manchuria
- Ideology: Korean independence movement
- Size: 1,600

- Northern Military Administration Office
- Hangul: 북로군정서
- Hanja: 北路軍政署
- RR: Bungno gunjeongseo
- MR: Pungno kunjŏngsŏ

The Northern Military Administration Office (Korean: 북로군정서) was an armed independence movement group founded in Donggandao in 1919. It originated from the Daejonggyo lineage. It was organized around Seo Il and Kim Jwa-jin in Jilin Province, Manchuria, in 1919. Based on the Junggwangdan organized by Koreans who immigrated to Bukgando, the Jeongjeongdan organized in Bukgando in 1919 was established by changing its name to Northern Military Administration Office. The Northern Military Administration Office established an officer training center to conduct military training and train independence fighters. In 1920, when Japan deployed its troops into Manchuria, it achieved a great victory over the Japanese army in the Battle of Cheongsanri.

== Overview ==
The Korean Military Government was created by merging the Korean Justice Corps and its affiliated Korean Military Government Association in 1919. In October 1919, under the leadership of Daejonggyo and Shinminhoe, Daehan Jeonguidan and Daehangunjeonghoe were merged and reorganized into Daehangunjeongbu under the direction of the Provisional Government of Shanghai in December of that year. The Provisional Government in Shanghai agreed on the condition that the name be changed to the Northern Military Administration Office. At the time of its founding, the main figures were Seo Il and Hyeon Cheon-muk, who invited Kim Jwa-jin as commander-in-chief and took charge of the organization and training of the independence army.

== Background ==
The origins of Northern Military Administration Office can be found in Junggwangdan, organized by Daejonggyo believers including Seo Il in March 1911. Believers of Daejonggyo, which was founded as a national religion worshiping Dangun, sought to relocate the headquarters to Manchuria after the Japanese colonial rule in 1910 and established a branch in Bukgando. Subsequently, patriotic Daejonggyo believers, including Seo Il, established the independence movement organization Junggwangdan and promoted the spirit of independence and patriotic ideology. Influenced by the growing atmosphere of independence caused by the March 1st Movement in 1919, Junggwangdan collaborated with other forces to form a new organization to more actively carry out the independence movement, which became the Korean Justice Corps.

=== Central Light Corps ===
The symbol of Dangunism.

The Central Light Corps (Junggwangdan (重光團)) was an armed group established by the Daejonggyo in North Gando in March 1911. It was established in Wangcheong County in March 1911 by members of the Daejong Church who fled to North Gando. Seo Il was the leader, and the executives of Daejonggyo were Baek Sun, Hyeon Cheon-muk, Park Chan-ik, Gye-hwa, Kim Byeong-deok [Kim Seong], Chae-oh, Yang Hyeon and Lee Hong-rae.

Although they aimed for armed struggle, they did not have the resources to acquire weapons, so they focused on strengthening the capabilities of the Korean community. From 1911 to 1916, he established 25 schools and operated them and provided education as a principal or teacher, to cultivate talented people.

Kim Gyo-heon, who became the second Taosagyo of Daejonggyo in 1916, went into exile in North Gando the following year and prepared for an armed struggle in earnest and launched a diplomatic independence movement. Wangqing County was used as the base for the resistance against Japan, Gopyeong was stationed in Vladivostok, Lee Min-bok was stationed in Nikolsk-Usurisky, Baek Sun was stationed in Milsan in Northern Manchuria, and Jin Hak-shin was stationed in Northern Manchuria. He attempted to connect with the independence movement forces in Manchuria and the Maritime Province by dispatching them to Korea. Baeksun and Lee Beom- yoon toured the border regions of Russia and China to recruit volunteer soldiers. In October 1918, Gyehwa hired a bomb maker and went to Jilin. Seong Kim and Shin Jeong was dispatched as a first- party delegation, but returned midway. It led the March 1st Movement in North Gando, and was progressively disbanded in May 1919.

=== Korean Justice Corps ===
The Korean Justice Corps was an organization organized around May 1919 as a union of Daejong followers and believers of other religions, such as the Confucian Church. The Korean Justice Corps aimed to carry out a secret armed struggle to achieve independence, and its leader was Seo Il. The Korean Justice Corps contributed to promoting the necessity of the anti-Japanese independence struggle and promoting national consciousness by publishing pure Hangeul journals such as 『Ilminbo (一民報)』 and 『New Gukbo (新國報)』. In August 1919, the Korean Justice Corps organized the Military Government Association as an armed group for the struggle for independence under its umbrella and distributed creative statements calling for the unity of Korean compatriots for the anti-Japanese independence struggle. From the beginning, independence activists had expected that the issue of Korea's independence would be discussed in accordance with the principle of national self-determination at the Paris Peace Conference held at the end of June 1919 after the March 1 Declaration of Independence. However, as no results were achieved contrary to expectations, the anti-Japanese armed movement, which valued the armed line rather than the diplomatic line, began to grow. Accordingly, the Korean Justice Corps organized a military government for armed struggle.

The Military Government Association, an armed group organized by the Korean Justice Corps in August 1919, can be said to be the predecessor of the Northern Military Government. However, because the existing leaders of the Korean Justice Corps were non-experts in military matters, they invited Kim Jwa-jin, a military attaché from the New People's Association, and others to guide the armed group and entrusted them with military training and the formation of an independent army. However, the fact that the Shinminhoe-affiliated nationalists took charge of the military government caused opposition from members of the Confucian Church. This is because the Shinminhoe group were republicans, while the Confucian church group supported the monarchy and were pro-Joseon dynasty loyalists. Eventually, after conflict, the Confucians broke away from the Korean Justice Corps.

=== Korean Northern Military Government ===
In October 1919, the Korean Justice Corps and the Military Government Association merged and reorganized the entire organization under the name of the Korean Northern Military Government (大韓軍政府). The president of the Korean military government was Seo Il, and the commander was Kim Jwa-jin. Subsequently, the establishment of the new Korean Military Government was reported to the Provisional Government of the Republic of Korea in Shanghai and applied for recognition as a military institution under the Provisional Government. At this time, the Provisional Government of the Republic of Korea requested that the name 'Korean Military Government' be changed to 'Korean Military Office'. Because the military government, as its name suggests, is not a military government, it has been criticized for saying that there cannot be two governments in one compatriot society.

=== Reorganization ===
In December 1919, the Korean Military Government accepted the Provisional Government's request and changed the name to 'Korean Military Office', and reported this to the Provisional Government, officially establishing the Korean Military Office. At that time, the Seorogunjeongseo established in the West Jiandao region was originally named 'Gunjeongbu', but at the request of the Provisional Government of the Republic of Korea, it was renamed to 'Seorogunjeongseo', so the Daehan Seorogunjeongseo in the North Gando area was prepared in preparation for the Seorogunjeongseo. It came to be nicknamed ‘Northern Military Administration Office’. The Northern Military Administration Office and the Western Military Administration Office also had a close cooperative relationship with each other. It was confirmed that the Northern Military Administration Office and the Western Military Administration Office were military organizations with the same purpose, and they agreed to cooperate with each other on military matters. Accordingly, instructors from the Sinhŭng Military Academy on the west side were dispatched to provide military education for the Northern Military Administration Office.

In other words, the Northern Military Administration Office is an armed independence organization established through a collaboration between Daejonggyo-affiliated nationalists and Shinminhoe-affiliated independence activists. As an independence military organization that supports republicanism, it was organized as a military agency under the Provisional Government of the Republic of Korea in Shanghai and is closely related to the Provisional Government.

== Organization ==
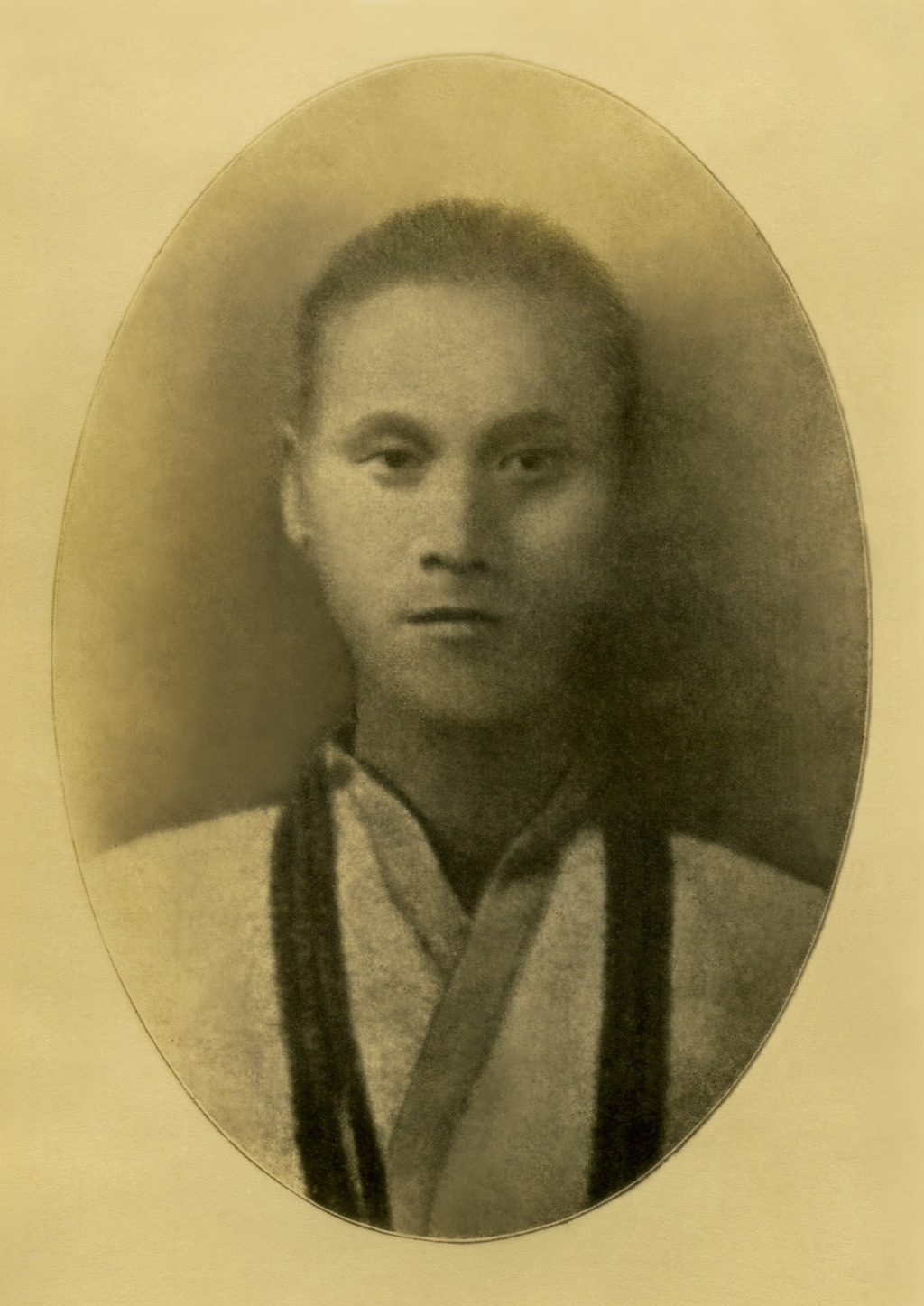
Seo-Il, President of the Northern Military Administration Office.

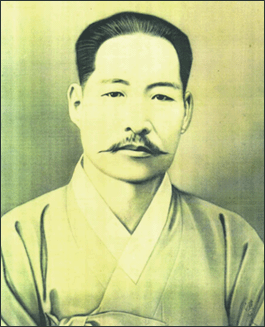
Kim Chwa-chin, Commander-in-Chief of the Northern Military Administration Office.

The officers at the time of the reorganization of the Northern Military Administration Office were Seo Il as the president, Kim Jwa- jin as the commander-in-chief, Yi Jang-nyeong as the chief of staff, Kim Kyu-sik as the division commander, Choi Hae as the brigade commander, regiment commander Jeong Hoon, Yeonseong commander Lee Beom-seok, Jilin branch office advisor Yun Bok-young, and military director Yang Hyeon. The independence army was organized into platoons, mediums, and battalions, with each platoon consisting of 50 people, two platoons into one company, and two companies into one battalion. The size of the troops initially numbered about 500. In July 1920, the Northern Military Administration Office established a Manchurian area with about and the size of the troops increased to 1,000 men, but increased to over 1,600 by August 1920.

The organization of the Northern Military Administration Office was divided into a central organization and a local organization, and the central organization was further divided into headquarters. The Governor's Office, with Seo Il as its president, directed overall affairs within the jurisdiction of the Northern Military Administration Office and supported military activities, and its headquarters was located in Deokwon-ri, Chunmyeong-hyang, Wangcheong-hyeon, North Gando. Meanwhile, the headquarters, with Kim Jwa-jin as commander-in-chief, was headquartered in Seodaepa (西大坡), Chunmyeong-hyang, Wangcheong-hyeon, a forest area suitable for preparing for military activities. The headquarters of the Northern Military Administration Office was built at a strategic location deep in the forest, and was a base equipped with barracks and a parade ground, and was a training site that completely blocked access to outsiders.

The Northern Military Administration Office raised military funds, equipped weapons, trained independence forces through military education, and carried out armed activities. The Northern Military Administration Office's military fundraising was primarily done through fundraising from residents in the jurisdictional areas under its influence. Recruitment of military funds was also carried out domestically, in the form of dispatching agents to the country to raise military funds. The military funds raised in this way were used to purchase weapons. The Northern Military Administration Office purchased weapons on Russian territory, purchasing weapons from the Czechoslovak Legion withdrawing from Siberia, or obtaining large quantities of weapons through Russians and Koreans naturalized in Russia. Seo Il, the head of the Northern Military Administration Office, personally went on a business trip to Russian territory and promoted the purchase of weapons. A transport party was organized to transport the weapons purchased in this way, and they were transported to the headquarters of the Seodae faction's Northern Military Administration Office through various routes.

=== Equipment ===
They're armed with 1,800 rifles, about 800 rounds of ammunition per military gun, 150 pistols, 7 machine guns, and many grenades. In August 1920, it exceeded 1,600, and it became the strongest elite unit in Northeast Manchuria armed with 1,300 rifles, 150 pistols, and 7 machine guns. Operating funds were covered by local residents or collected from domestic sources. The funds were mainly used to purchase weapons, and the personal equipment per person in the independence army was 1 rifle, 500 bullets, 1 grenade, 6 sets of emergency food, and 1 pair of sandals. It became the largest independence movement organization.

== Training ==
The Northern Military Administration Office set up the base in the forest area of about 30 acres in the area of Seodaepasimnipyeong in Wangqing County and built 8 barracks to establish a military academy. They requested help from Sinhŭng Military Academy, and were supplied with various teaching materials and a number of officers including Kim Chwa-chin and younger instructors Lee Beom-seok, Lee Jang-nyeong, Kim Gyu-sik, Kim Hong-guk, Choi Sang-un, and Oh Sang-se, citizens and young people coming from home were selected and full-scale military training was conducted.

Kim Jwa-jin, the commander-in-chief of the Northern Military Administration Office, recruited young men and formed an independence army, with the primary goal of training executives to command the independence army. Accordingly, he established the Officer Training Center (士官鍊成所) to educate and train executives at the headquarters in early February 1920. Kim Jwa-jin served as the principal of the training center, and requested help from the Sinhŭng Military Academy in the West Jiandao region, inviting several training officers, including instructor Lee Beom-seok, and receiving teaching materials. Among the recruited men, about 300 excellent young men who were physically healthy and patriotic were selected and provided officer training.

Officer training was provided as an accelerated training course for 6 months in accordance with the urgent needs of the time, and its contents included mental education, history, military science, martial arts (weapons and unit command and operation), gymnastics, and rules and regulations. In particular, history education was aimed at cultivating national spirit by focusing on the history of independence of countries around the world and the history of Japan's invasion of Joseon. Military education was conducted based on the military methods of the former Korean Empire, and thorough military training was conducted at two parade grounds within the headquarters. Live-fire shooting practice was conducted against a model of the Imperial Japanese Military, and people from the Chinese military or Russian military academies were invited as instructors. In June 1920, out of 600 men who completed basic training, only 300 went into full-scale military training wearing gray military uniforms. In addition to military training, Gunjeongseo not only cooperated with independent movement organizations in Noryeong and Gando, but also served as a contact center for independence activists in northern Manchuria. While paying attention to local administration, elementary schools, night schools, and training centers were established, while promoting convenience in local industries. The first Officer Training Center graduation ceremony was held on September 9, 1920, and 298 officers were graduated. Among them, 80 were appointed as second lieutenants, and the Gyoseongdae (Gyoseongdae, or Yeonsungdae) was organized around the remaining 200 people. This unit was the most elite unit and later played a leading role in leading the Battle of Cheongsanri to victory.

In other words, the Northern Military Independence Army received thorough military training and, including the creation and operation of a separate machine gun company, was the largest and most thoroughly trained unit among the various independence army units of this period. In addition, the Northern Provincial Government established a police trust organization as a detailed system within the sphere of influence, established branch offices within the sphere of influence, and organized an organization for each unit to inspect the civil administration and implement self-government, as well as to understand the movements of the Japanese military and provide information. It was possible to report immediately.

== Activities ==
As dozens of armed independence movement groups emerged in the Manchuria region, the Japanese began to suppress the anti-Japanese independence forces in Manchuria on a large scale. In order to block the increasingly active activities of the independence army, the Japanese military established the 'Gando Region Bulyeongseon Soto Plan' to send a large number of regular troops into Manchuria. In October 1920, under the pretext of sending troops to Manchuria, a Chinese territory, Japan bribed Chinese bandits to attack the Japanese consulate in Hongchun, causing the Hongchun Incident. Then, under the pretext of protecting the Japanese in Manchuria, about 20,000 troops, including the 19th and 20th Divisions of the Joseon Garrison Army, the 11th, 13th, and 14th Divisions of the Siberian Expeditionary Force, the Manchuria Expeditionary Force, and the Kwantung Army, were committed to Manchuria. At this time, the independence forces had already moved their base to a safe mountainous area. In September 1920, the Northern Military Administration Office also left the base of the Western faction and moved its troops to the north at the urging of Maeng Bu-deok, commander of the Chinese army's Yanji unit. As soon as the first graduation ceremony of the Officer Training Center was held, the move to the base was carried out.

=== Battle of Cheongsanri ===
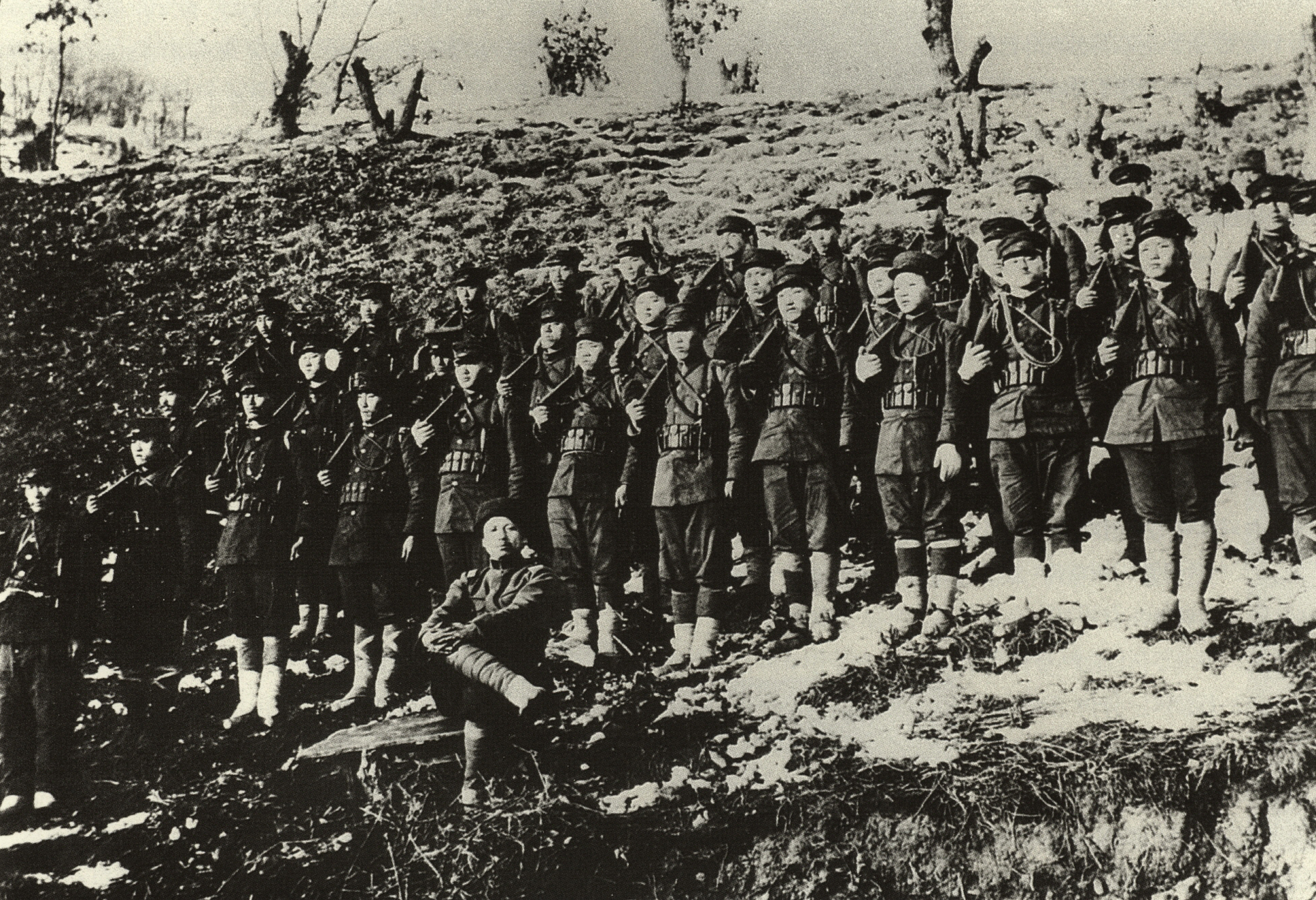
Commemorative photo of the Northern Military Administration Office after the Battle of Qingshanli.

The Korean Independence Army led by Hong Beom-do moved toward Ido-gu and Samdo-gu in Hwaryong-hyeon. The Northern Military Administration Office also arrived near Cheongsan-ri, Samdo-gu, Hwaryong-hyeon (和龍縣) on October 12. The Japanese army also pursued the Korean Independence Army, and about 5,000 Izuma troops surrounded the Northern Military Administration Office in Cheongsan-ri, Samdo-gu and the Hong Beom-do joint unit in Ido-gu. The Northern Military Administration Office, led by Kim Jwa-jin, judged that it could not escape the pursuit of the Japanese army and launched a decisive battle, resulting in the Battle of Cheongsanri from October 21 to dawn of 26, 1920. The Battle of Cheongsanri includes about 10 battles, of which the Battle of Baekunpyeong, Battle of Cheonsupyeong, Battle of Maenggaegol, and Battle of Mangu were fought solely by the Independence Army of Northern Korea. It was a battle that was fought and won, and the Battle of Eorangchon (漁郞村) and the Battle of Cheonbosan (天寶山) were battles jointly fought by the Northern Military Administration Office and Korean Independence Army.

In the Battle of Cheongsanri, the independence army surprised and annihilated the Japanese army, killing about 1,200 people, including the Japanese regiment commander, and the number of casualties on the independence army side was minimal. The Battle of Cheongsanri was the largest battle that the independence army faced against the Japanese army after its dispatch from Gando, and this victory can be said to be an achievement achieved mainly by the elite units of the Northern Military Administration Office.

== Dissolution ==
After being defeated in the Battle of Fengwudong and Cheongsan-ri, the Japanese caused the Gando Massacre and indiscriminately massacred the civilians of Gando. At this time, the Northern Military Administration Office, along with other anti-Japanese independence forces in Manchuria, gathered in Misan, the border area between Manchuria and the Soviet Union, to avoid Japanese surveillance. Here, the independence fighters united to form the Korean Independence Corps with Seo Il as its leader, and headed to Free City in the Soviet Union.

However, due to the Free City Incident in June 1921, the Independence Corps was disarmed, suffered a heavy blow, and many were killed and deserted the unit. Senior executives of the North Military Office Administration, including Seo Il and Kim Jwa-jin, noticed strange signs of the Soviet Communist Party in advance and escaped, returned to North Manchuria, and reorganized the unified independence army unit again in August 1922, but a large-scale independence corps like the one organized before was not reorganized.

== See also ==
- Korean Independence Movement
  - List of militant Korean independence activist organizations
    - Korean Independence Army
    - Korean Independence Corps
- Battle of Fengwudong
- Battle of Cheongsanri
- Free City Incident
