= March First Movement in Hoengseong =

1919 Protest in the March 1st Movement

During March 1st Movement, Hoengseong was the first district to join the independence movement in Gangwon-do Province. The claims for national independence in Hoengseong were much stronger than any other districts in the province. The declaration of independence was circulated among people by Lee Chae-il and Lee Dong-gu from the Cheondo Church, and the copies of the declaration and the national flag of Korea, or Taegeukgi, were distributed out by Choi Jong-ha, Shin Jae-geun, And Chang Dong-hun. On the 27th day of March 1919, hundreds of people crowded into a local market to clamor for national independence carrying the national flags. This event ended with arrests of eight participants. On April 1, people gathered in crowds of more than 1,300, making a massive wave of Taegeukgi flags. More than 200 people continued their protest at a Japanese military police outstation until the next day, clamoring for the independence of Korea and the release of the arrested. Until April 12, while the strong voice for national independence spread to towns and villages across the community, many patriots were killed by Japanese invaders on the spot or elsewhere, including Ha Yeong-hyeon, Kang Dal-hoe, Chun Han-guk, Kang Seong—soon, and Kang Man-hyeong who died in prison.
