= Yang Se-bong =

Korean independence activist (1890–1938)

- 양세봉
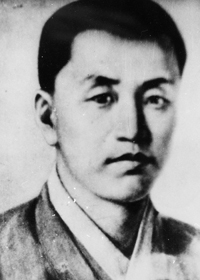

Commander-in-chief of the Korean Revolutionary Army
- In office 1931–1934
- Preceded by: Lee Jin-tak
- Succeeded by: Kim Ho-seok

Personal details
- Born: June 5, 1896 Yeonsan-dong, Seri-myeon, Cheolsan, North Pyongan Province
- Died: August 12, 1934 (aged 38) Sohwang-gu, Hwanin-hyeon, Jilin, Manchuria
- Cause of death: Assassination by gunshot
- Resting place: Unknown
- Party: Korean Revolutionary Party
- Spouse: Lim Jae-sun

- Yang Se-bong
- Hangul: 양세봉
- Hanja: 梁世奉
- RR: Yang Sebong
- MR: Yang Sebong

Art name
- Hangul: 벽해
- Hanja: 碧海
- RR: Byeokhae
- MR: Pyŏkhae

Yang Se-bong (Korean: 양세봉; June 5, 1896 – August 12, 1934) was a Korean independence activist and the commander-in-chief of the Korean Revolutionary Army of the National People's Prefecture, during the Japanese colonial period. General Yang Se-bong has joined several independence organization training and leading resistance fighters against the Japanese military and police in Manchuria and Korea. Yang Se-bong was a leader who was transcendent, who warmly embraced the mistakes of his subordinates and did not criticize them under any circumstances. Yang posthumously received the recipient of the Order of Merit for National Foundation.

== Early life and activities ==
Yang Won-bong was born as the eldest of siblings into a poor farming family in Yeonsan-dong, Seri-myeon, Cheolsan, North Pyongan Province, and his nickname is Byeokhae. His father's name is unknown, his mother is Kim A-gyu, and his brothers' names were Yang Won-bong, Yang Sibong, and Yang Bong-nyeo. While working as a school worker in Cheolsan-gun, his teacher recognized Yang Se-bong's talent and taught him the basic knowledge of Chinese classics, including the Thousand Character Classic, over the course of two years. He learned the Cheonjamun, Dongmong Anthology, and Myeongmyeongbogam over his shoulder.

An anti-Japanese consciousness sprouted in his young heart as he saw the Japanese invasion spread to this area, plundering innocent residents and committing all kinds of atrocities. In October 1909, when he heard that Ahn Jung-geun assassinated Ito Hirobumi, the prime minister of the Empire of Japan, at Harbin Station, he admired and respected Ahn's spirit.

When his father died in 1912 when he was 16 years old, he took charge of the household. In 1916, he married Lim Jae-sun when he was 20. However, due to declining fortunes, it was no longer possible to live in the country, so in the harsh winter of 1917, he moved with his family to Geumguchon, Sado-gu, Heunggyeong-hyeon. There was a rumor going around that if he went to Manchuria, he would be able to eat his fill. So he blindly stamped the immigration claim form. In 1919, he moved to Hongmyoja, where many Koreans live. He moved to (子). So, he supported his family as a tenant farmer. In the spring of 1919, while he was living in Hongmyoja, Sinbin-hyeon, when the national March 1st Movement broke out in Korea, he and Lee Se-il, the principal of Heungdong School, rallied the residents and led the independence demonstration movement.

== Cheonmasan Army ==
Immediately after the March 1st Movement in 1919, he joined the Cheonmasan Army, which was carrying out an armed anti-Japanese movement based on Mt. Chŏnma (Chonma-san) in Sakju-gun, North Pyongan Province, and worked to destroy Japanese ruling institutions and purge pro-Japanese activists. In 1920, he moved to Manchuria and worked at the Liberation Army General Command.

In 1922, he supported the anti-Japanese movement in connection with Kim Myeong-bong (金明奉) and Jeong Chang-ha (鄭昌夏), the leaders of the independence group. He also became a local agent of the independence group and supported the independence movement by supplying food. In the winter of the same year, he joined the Cheonmasandae (天麻山隊: 崔時興). The Cheonmasandae was an armed independence army organized by Choi Si-heung, Choi Ji-poong, and Park Eung-baek in December 1920, with about 500 young and middle-aged men. Armed with conventional weapons, rifles, and weapons taken from the enemy, they fought throughout the province. He carried out guerrilla warfare, raiding enemy substations, police stations, and township offices, and executed Japanese secret agents and police officers. He carried out attacks on the border of Uiju, Sakju, and Gwiseong counties, and attacked the Yudong Police Station, Geumgwang Office, and Yeongrimchang of Changseong County. Here, he stole military supplies and gold bars and used them as military funds.

=== Joining the Korean Unification Government ===
In August 1922, representatives of 8 divisions and 9 meetings, including the Western Military Government and the Korean Independence Army, the Korean Liberation Army Military Camp, the Korean Liberation Army General Command, and the Pyeonganbuk-do Dokpanbu They held a meeting for the unification of the Han people in southern Manchuria in Magwonja, Hwanin County, China, and formed the Korean Tonguibu (大韓統義府), which integrated each independence movement group in southern Manchuria. Tonguibu had 10 departments under the president (金東三) and vice president (蔡相德), including civil affairs, negotiation, military, legal affairs, finance, academic affairs, business, power, transportation, and staff. Under each department, there was a bureau, and a secretarial department and a judicial office were established. An independent government was formed that integrated civil and military administration in the southern Manchurian region. At this time, the teacher was active as a member of the 3rd Company (Company Commander: Choi Ji-poong) under the Uigun of Daehan Tonguibu.

=== Joining the Provisional Government ===
In early 1923, the so-called subjugation plan of the Empire of Japan against Cheonmasandae resulted in all kinds of atrocities being committed, including attacking and setting fire to Koreans living in the area as well as the base of the independence army. As a result, it was no longer possible to operate in the country, so Choi Siheung led the Cheonmasandae and moved to Yuhahyeon in Manchuria. Afterwards, Cheonmasandae joined with the General Command of the Liberation Army, which was carrying out armed activities there, and was expanded and reorganized into the Cheolmabyeolyeong of the Liberation Army. At this time, the teacher was appointed as an inspector for Dongyeong and worked hard to establish military discipline by guiding delinquent soldiers, while strengthening training to raise the volunteer army to the level of the regular army, earning great trust from General Oh Dong-jin, the commander-in-chief. The General Directorate of the Liberation Army was an armed group launched in Anzi District, Guanzhen County, China in September 1920. It was an army unit under the direct control of the Provisional Government and had jurisdiction over North Korea. Afterward, Cheonmasan Headquarters merged with the Provisional Government of the Republic of Korea. Yang Se-bong began to demonstrate his ability using the Provisional Government as a stepping stone.

== Service for the General Staff Headquarters ==
Around May 1923, Japanese police stations, myeon offices, etc. in the area of Changseong-gun, Pyeongbuk, Pan-myeon, Chosan-gun, and Yeongsan, Goryeong, Uiju-gun. He amassed a record of attacking and killing dozens of enemies. In August 1923, when the Daehan Tonguibu was divided into the Uigunbu due to conflict in the strategy of the independence movement, the 1st, 2nd, 3rd, and 5th companies of the Tonguibu volunteer army were organized by Hwanin-hyeon Magwonja. The Ministry of Military Affairs of the Provisional Government recognized the General Staff Headquarters as a military organization, focusing on Fusong, Changbai, Antu, Tonghua, and Yuhwa along the Yalu River and Jian County in China, etc., were placed in charge of the civil and military administration of the compatriot community. The General Staff Headquarters carried out an active armed struggle through operations to enter the country. He actively carried out domestic invasion operations as a platoon commander, and was later promoted to the 3rd company commander.

=== Attempted assassination of Makoto Saito ===
Appointed as a platoon leader of the 3rd Company of the General Staff Headquarters, he fought with the Japanese police at Seongnam-dong, Chosan-gun, Pyeongbuk, and Gosan River, Ganggye-gun, on May 16, 1924, killing several enemies. When they received information that the Governor General of Korea Makoto Saito, the culprit behind the Japanese occupation, was patrolling the Yalu River, the border area, on the 19th of the same month, they joined forces with the 1st Platoon led by Platoon Leader Han Woong-gwon of the 2nd Company of the General Staff Headquarters and took part in a battle that was beyond the reach of Japanese security. Elite troops were stationed at Masitan Cliff on the Manchurian side of the river and commanded sniping as Saito passed by on a border patrol boat on the Yalu River. As the guard ship approached, shooting began, but surprisingly the range was too far. The guard ship fled at full speed to avoid the hail of bullets. In the end, the big task of punishing the Governor-General of Korea was nothing more than an attempt, but it was an operation that shook Japan's nerves with the intelligence and execution power of the Korean Independence Army.

In particular, after the March 1st Movement, Saito was only making false boasts about moderating Japan's rule over Korea in the name of so-called cultural politics, which not only served as a bombshell warning to him, but also served as an opportunity to further promote the activities of the Korean independence army both at home and abroad. This incident led to the Japanese colonial government signing the so-called Samshi Agreement (三矢協定), the so-called Samsi Agreement (三矢協定), in 1925 between Samsi (三矢), head of the police department of the Japanese Government General of Korea, and the police chief of Bongcheonseong in Manchuria, and the Chinese authorities As it had the obligation to suppress the independence movement, the activities of the independence army suffered a significant blow.

In June 1924, he led a platoon of the General Staff Headquarters and entered Ganggye and Wiwon, Pyeongguk Province and engaged in combat with the Japanese police. At the end of the same year, he was promoted to the 3rd commander of the Chamuibu and participated in anti-Japanese armed activities and Builbae in the area of Hwajeon County in southern Manchuria. Japanese purges were actively carried out.

=== Leading the National Unity Party Organization ===
In July of the same year, while General Shin Pal-gyun, commander of Tonguibu and chairman of the Military Commission, was training officers of the Military Academy in Milim-ri, Ido-gu, Wangcheongmun, a group of bandits instigated by the Japanese raided and faced a crisis. When he was cornered, he and his crew quickly launched a rescue operation and provided covering fire, but suffered the tragic death of dozens of independence fighters, including General Shin Pal-gyun. Tonguibu faced a crisis. In July 1924, a general meeting of the All-Manchurian Unification Council was held in Jilin, where an agreement was reached on Daedong unity. On November 25 of the same year, about 10 organizations, including Tonguibu, Daehangunjeongseo, Jilim Residents' Association, and Uiseongdan, gathered together. 25 people, including Kim Dong-sam, Ko Hal-sin, Lee Jin-san, Lee Cheon-min, Kim Ho, and Lee Jang-nyeong, gathered together and elected Kim Dong-sam as the chairman and discussed. After repeated efforts, the Righteous Government was formed.

The Righteous Government organized all sectors, including local military finance, administration, education, and judiciary, in accordance with the national system. However, in September 1925, less than a year after the establishment of the Righteous Government, Yi Sang-ryong, who was appointed as the first Prime Minister of the Provisional Government, met Oh Dong-jin, Kim Dong-sam, and Yun Se-yong, leaders of the independence movement in Manchuria, Lee Yu-pil (李裕弼), Kim Jwa-jin (金佐鎭), and Hyeon Cheon-muk (玄天黙), all three representatives of the Righteous Government, General Staff Headquarters, and Korean People's Association in Manchuria, were appointed as provisional cabinet members, leading to the independence movement calling for an armed struggle in Manchuria. The utilitarianism of the prize emerged and internal strife in the Righteous Government was expressed. Accordingly, in January 1926, Lee Hae-ryong (李海龍), chairman of the standing committee of the National Assembly, held the Military and People's Representative Council, an emergency council, to resolve the situation, established a new charter, and formed a new central council and administrative committee accordingly.

As a result, the Righteous Government solidified its foundation as a Han administration with a distinctly republican identity in the southern Manchurian region. In November of the same year, he was appointed commander of the 1st company of the Jeongjeongbu and took the lead in eliminating Japanese soldiers and police. At that time, the Kuomintang formed a united front through the collaboration between it and the Chinese Communist Party, and as a unified movement to promote a united front occurred in Korea, including the formation of the Singanhoe, an integrated body of the left and right, the Manchurian region also began to form a unified front, led by the Righteous Government, from May 12, 1928. For 15 days until the 26th, the All-People's One-Party Organizational Meeting was held in Hwajeon and Banseok, China, with 39 representatives from 18 organizations attending.

At this time, the teacher, who was active as a company commander of the Righteous Government volunteer army in Hwajeon County, attended the organizational meeting of the Yuil Party as a representative of the Righteous Government and formed a new organizational alliance for the Unified National Party. Due to the non-cooperation of the party (who was linked to communists), the formation of a single party was not successful. Afterwards, in September 1928, representatives of the General Staff Headquarters, Righteous Government, and the Korean People's Association in Manchuria gathered at Shinandun near Jilin and attempted to unify the three departments, but as they were unable to achieve their goal, the following year, in April 1929, the Norean People's Association in Manchuria's Civil Affairs Committee (representative) led by the Righteous Government's Lee Kyo-won and the General Staff Headquarters' Shim Yong-jun gathered together to form a new military government, the National People's Prefecture. At this time, he was appointed as the commander of the 1st company and played an active role. He organized the Chosenminbu subjugation command under the National People's Prefecture and became the vice-commander of this command, along with Commander-in-Chief Lee Woong, the leading organization of the Japanese imperialists. With the main mission of subjugation, he took the lead in raiding Japanese institutions and punishing Japanese secret agents.

== Service for the National People's Prefecture ==
In December of the same year, at the central meeting of the National People's Prefecture, the National Unity Party Organization Alliance was reorganized into the Korean Revolutionary Party, and at the same time, the Korean Revolutionary army belonging to it was made independent and the Korean Revolutionary Army, an armed group, was formed as a subordinate organization of the National People's Prefecture, which was previously affiliated with the Righteous Government. The unit was reorganized and some of the troops from the General Affairs Headquarters and Korean People's Association of Manchuria were absorbed and integrated. He took on the important role of deputy commander and actively carried out armed activities such as raiding enemy organizations and exterminating Japanese secret agents. When the Korean Revolutionary Party representative meeting was held in August 1930, the Korean Revolutionary Party was divided into the nationalist, which supported the National People's Prefecture, and socialist, which opposed it. Nationalist board members, including Hyeon Ik-cheol, Ko I-heo, Kim Mun-hak, and Yang Hasan (real name 梁基瑕), actively supported the National People's Prefecture and supported the decisions made by the party committee. While Go Hal-sin, Kim Seok-ha, Lee Woong, Hyeon Jeong-gyeong, and Lee Seong-geun opposed this, they disbanded the National People's Prefecture and the Korean Revolutionary Party and reorganized the army into the Red Guards. He argued that farmers should form a peasant association and wage a powerful struggle.

He became the Deputy Commander of the Korean Revolutionary Army. Yang Se-bong first repressed the pro-Japanese organization called the Sunminbu (Pro-Japanese People's Party), gaining the attention and support of the masses. In 1931, he became the Commander-in-Chief and conducted frequent infiltration operations not only in Manchuria but also domestically. In just one year, 1932, his troops crossed the Amnok River 16 times, leading fundraising and attacks on institutions, as well as punishing pro-Japanese factions.

=== Korean Revolutionary Army ===
Senior executives of the Korean Revolutionary Party, including Yang Se-bbong, Yang Ki-ha, and Go Yi-he, convened a meeting of leaders of each branch of the Korean Revolutionary Army and discussed self-rescue measures for the Korean Revolutionary Army and the Korean Revolutionary Party in crisis. Afterwards, the organization was reorganized. They appointed Yang Se-bong as Commander-in-Chief of the Korean Revolutionary Army, Go Yi-heo as Chairman of the Korean Revolutionary Party, Kim Dong-san as Chairman of the Executive Committee of the National People's Prefecture, Kim Hak-gyu as Chief of Staff of the Korean Revolutionary Army, Lee Sang-gwan as Minister of Finance, and Hong Sim Won (洪深元) as Correspondent for the Ministry of Foreign Affairs and the Provisional Government respectively.

In order to carry out the decisive battles against the Japanese, the military was organized into five divisions, with Park Dae-ho as the first commander, Han Geom-chu as the second commander, and Jo Hwa-seon as the third commander, Choi Yun-gu (崔允龜) was appointed as the 4th commander, and Jeong Gwang-bae (鄭光培) was appointed as the 5th commander. In addition, the headquarters of the Commander-in-Chief was moved and installed at Wangcheongmun in Honggyeong-hyeon, and Hwaheung Middle School (化興中學), which was once established by the Righteous Government, was reorganized into an attribute military school and placed under the jurisdiction of the Korean Revolutionary Army, and was moved to Gangjeon (江甸子). Yang Hasan (梁荷山) was appointed as the principal of the military academy, Yun Il-pa (尹一波) was appointed as the commander, and Hankookshin (韓國信) was appointed as the instructor. As an honorary principal, he devoted himself to nurturing independence fighters and enhancing their anti-Japanese capabilities.

=== An alliance with the Chinese ===
At the same time, after consulting with Lee Chun-yun, Commander-in-Chief of the Chinese Volunteer Army, and signing an agreement to organize the Liaoning People's Self-Defense Force, the Korean Revolutionary Army was organized into a special task force and a propaganda battalion, and Mr. Lee served as the commander of the special task force of the Liaoning People's Self-Defense Force. Kim Gwang-ok (金光玉) served as the commander of the propaganda battalion. The reason why the Korean Revolutionary Army joined forces with the Chinese volunteer army as a special task force and propaganda battalion was because the unit was smaller than the Chinese army but possessed excellent combat power. The formation of the Korean-Chinese joint forces restrained the disorderly actions of Chinese armed groups such as Daedohoe and Hongchanghoe, which were active in various places, and at the same time, the feelings of Chinese people toward Koreans also improved. In this way, while successfully carrying out joint operations with the Chinese army, he established the Korea Revolutionary Army Military Academy to supplement the revolutionary forces consumed in battle and, as the principal, focused on directly training the military.

== Joint Korean-Chinese Campaigns ==
When the Manchurian Incident occurred on September 18, 1931, when Japan invaded northeastern China, the need for a solidarity struggle between Korea and China was urgent. He insisted on cooperating with the Han Chinese, and he also insisted on cooperating with the Communist Party-affiliated Northeast Anti-Japanese Alliance. So in November of the same year, the teacher met Wang Dong-heon, a Chinese man, at Wangcheng Gate, Xinbin County. A joint unit was formed in consultation with the Liaoning Peasant Self-Defense Corps. And he was elected as a member of the executive committee of the Korean Revolutionary Party and began to exert considerable influence on the National People's Prefecture and the Korean Revolutionary Party.

In January 1932, key executives of the Korean Revolutionary Party and the military convened a central executive meeting at the house of Seo Se-myeong in Hebei, Xinbin County, China, to discuss pending issues facing the September 18 Incident. They were attacked by the police at the Japanese consulate branch of Tonghua, who had been tipped off by the Bominhoe, a pro-Japanese pro-Japanese group, including Lee Ho-won, the chairman of the Central Executive Committee of the Korean Revolutionary Party, Kim Bo-an, the commander of the Korean Revolutionary Army, Vice-Commander Jang Se-yong, Deputy Director Park Chi-hwa, and Guards Captain Lee Gyu-seong. About 10 people, including the National People's Prefecture Public Security Executive Committee Chairman Lee Jong-geon, were arrested, and the Japanese police's arrests that continued until early March resulted in the arrest of 83 executives in 9 prefectures, dealing a fatal blow.

In addition, Chinese Generals Tang Cuo, Wang Yu-wen, Sun Su-an, Zhang Zong-ju, Wang Bong-gak, and Seo Da-san responded and began to engage in anti-Japanese struggle. After signing the agreement until October of the same year, the combined forces of the Liaoning People's Self-Defense Force and the Korean Revolutionary Army fought nearly 200 major battles with the Japanese army. In March 1932, the teacher led three companies, including Chief of Staff Kim Hak-gyu and Company Commanders Cho Hwa-seon, Choi Woon-gu, and Jeong Bong-gil, and joined forces with Chinese volunteer troops Wang Dong-heon and Yang Seok-bong to capture the Fusun Cheon Geum-chae (撫順 千金寨) at Wangqing Gate in Xinbin County. During the march to, they camped south of Sinbin. Upon hearing this information, the enemy Kwantung Army stationed in Sinbin County armed themselves with heavy weapons such as mortars and machine guns and attacked the Allied forces. However, they were caught up in the tactics of the Korean Revolutionary Army, which was familiar with the geography, and when the army lost the hill and retreated within an hour of the engagement, they chased for about 30 ri and on that day, they reached Yongneungga, east of Sinbin, and then occupied Sanghyeop River.

=== Battle of Yongneungga ===
In this battle, the Allied forces achieved great success by capturing numerous trophies, while also serving as an opportunity to reconcile the conflicts between the Korean and Chinese peoples and further solidify their ties. In late March 1932, when the army, which had suffered a crushing defeat in the Battle of Yonglinga, suddenly occupied Heunggyeongseong by mobilizing bombers, the general, considering the strategic value of the area, united with 10,000 troops of the Chinese volunteer army Lee Chun-yun, and the Korean Revolutionary Army rushed to Dongmun and invaded China. The volunteer army attacked through the north gate. The exhausted enemy forces retreated to the southwest gate.

In early May of the same year, Lee Chun-yun and Wang Dong-heon of the Liaoning People's Anti-Japanese Self-Defense Force advanced to Yongling Street in Xinbin County to attack the Japanese and Manchurian forces and engaged in a fierce battle, but had to retreat due to lack of troops. It has been done. Afterwards, until October, the Korean Revolutionary Army fought several major battles, but it was difficult to avoid being inferior due to the lack of air power. Through the contribution of Wang Dong-heon, who was the commander of the Chinese side of the Liaoning People's Self-Defense Force at the time, we reflect on the bloodshed of the Korean Revolutionary Army. This is part of the content included in <Monthly Korean People> published in Chongqing.

=== Yang's 1933 Campaigns ===
In January 1933, as China's Tangquo unit disintegrated and collapsed, a convening meeting of the leaders of the Korean Revolutionary Army was held at Moksudun, Namui, Wangqingmun, and he was reappointed as Commander-in-Chief and Park Dae-ho as Deputy Commander. At the same time reorganized the unit into three districts, and appointed Ko I-heo as general-in-chief of the Korean Revolutionary Party and Kim Dong-san as vice-chairman of the National People's Prefecture. In addition, it was decided to seek ways to recruit troops and raise finances, establish military regulations, seek national unity, and engage in guerrilla warfare in conjunction with the Chinese volunteer army.

On February 8, the people of Korea and China gathered together their comrades, with those who had guns carrying guns and those without guns carrying hoes, sickles, hoes and even daggers. In response to this appeal, 800 Koreans came forward to help destroy the enemy, and on the Chinese side, 2,500 people, excluding 500 former soldiers of the Self-Defense Forces, came forward. He soon swore an oath and launched a rebellion. The mountains and rivers remained the same, but personnel affairs did not meet expectations. The two generals, Yang Se-bong and Yang Hasan, went to war before and after, and Representative Kim Hak-gyu entered the jurisdiction (mainland China within Shanhaiguan) (abbreviated).

In March of this year, the Korean-Chinese allied forces attacked and recaptured Yongneungga, which was occupied by the Japanese army, and in 1933, they attacked Heunggyeong (興京) and defeated the Japanese army waving the Taegeukgi and the Cheongcheon Baekilgi, and holding the victory festival was in full swing, and morale was high. Afterwards, he participated in the Battle of Heunggyeongseong, the Battle of Nogu (老溝臺戰鬪), and the Battle of Kweedae Moja (快大帽子戰鬪), and achieved successive victories in battles. The Korean Revolutionary Army convened an executive meeting in Honggyeong-hyeon Ssangripja (雙砬子) and decided on policies to expand the scope of the anti-Japanese alliance of the Joseon Revolutionary Army, establish an anti-Japanese base, attack the Japanese invaders, etc., and initiate other armed struggles. It was decided to pursue it in conjunction with the forces.

In April of the same year, the Korean Revolutionary Army moved its stage of activity to the Korean-Chinese border area around Jijihyeon and Imganghyeon (臨江縣) to carry out guerrilla warfare and domestic entry operations, and in May, Seo Won-jun (徐元俊) was sent to Hwanghae Province as the head of the domestic guerrilla unit. They broke in and attacked the Sariwon police station.

=== Battle of Kwaedaemuja ===
In June of the same year, he dispatched Chief of Staff Kim Hak-gyu to Beijing, contacted Tang Qiuo, who had withdrawn to China, and requested support from Chiang Kai-shek's Nationalist government. He also attacked a Japanese military train at Jinjuryeong in Honggyeong County and executed dozens of enemies. Anti-Japanese warfare continued until June of the same year.

On July 7 of the same year, the Japanese army attacked the headquarters of the Korea Revolutionary Army in Seokin-gu, Yeongneung-ga, but with the support of the Harmonized Line unit, the Korean Revolutionary Army launched a bold counterattack, killing about 40 soldiers and taking away three light machine guns, one heavy artillery, and a rifle. He recorded a record of capturing 80 vessels. In mid-July, Yang Se-bong's unit joined with the 500 remaining soldiers of Lee Chun-yun's volunteer army unit and occupied Nogudae in Musun County and engaged in a fierce battle with a group the size of a regiment for two full days. Afterwards, the Japanese army again attacked Choi Yun-yong's unit of the 1st Area Army stationed in Kwaedaemuja (快大茂子), Tonghwa-hyeon with one battalion of troops, but the Japanese army was repulsed with the support of the Hwaseong Line unit. At this time, Choi Joo-bong's unit chased the retreating army again and killed about 80 people.

== Assassination ==
Around this time, Park Chang-hae, a Japanese secret agent, bribed Wang Myeong-beon, a Chinese who directly and indirectly supported the revolutionary army, and visited the general who was staying in Hwanin-hyeon under the pretext of discussing an alliance with the Chinese anti-Japanese army. It was lured into the valley of Sohwang-gu, Hwanin-hyeon. On August 12, 1934, the general followed Mr. Wang along with his adjutants Kim Gwang-wook, Kim Seong-hae, and Kim Chu-sang. While the group was on their way to Darabjagu, dozens of gunmen suddenly jumped out from the sorghum fields on the left and right and surrounded the group. At that moment, Mr. Wang aimed a gun at the general's chest and said,

"I am not the Mr. Wang of the past. If you do not want to receive these bullets, surrender to the Japanese army.”

— Wang Myeong-beon.

The general opened his eyes wide and scolded him with dignity, but in the end, he was assassinated by secret agents Park Chang-hae and his associates, including the Chinese Mr. Wang, and met a violent end.

His comrades buried him in peace on the side of a mountain without the knowledge of the Japanese, but it is said that the Japanese consulate police detected this and committed the atrocity of digging up the grave, taking out the body, and taking the head. It is barbarism without humanity or morality. Even after the general's death, Kim Ho-seok (金浩石) took office as commander-in-chief, but the Korean Revolutionary Army's power was rapidly diminished and the independence army barely maintained its existence through small-scale guerrilla warfare.

== Legacy ==
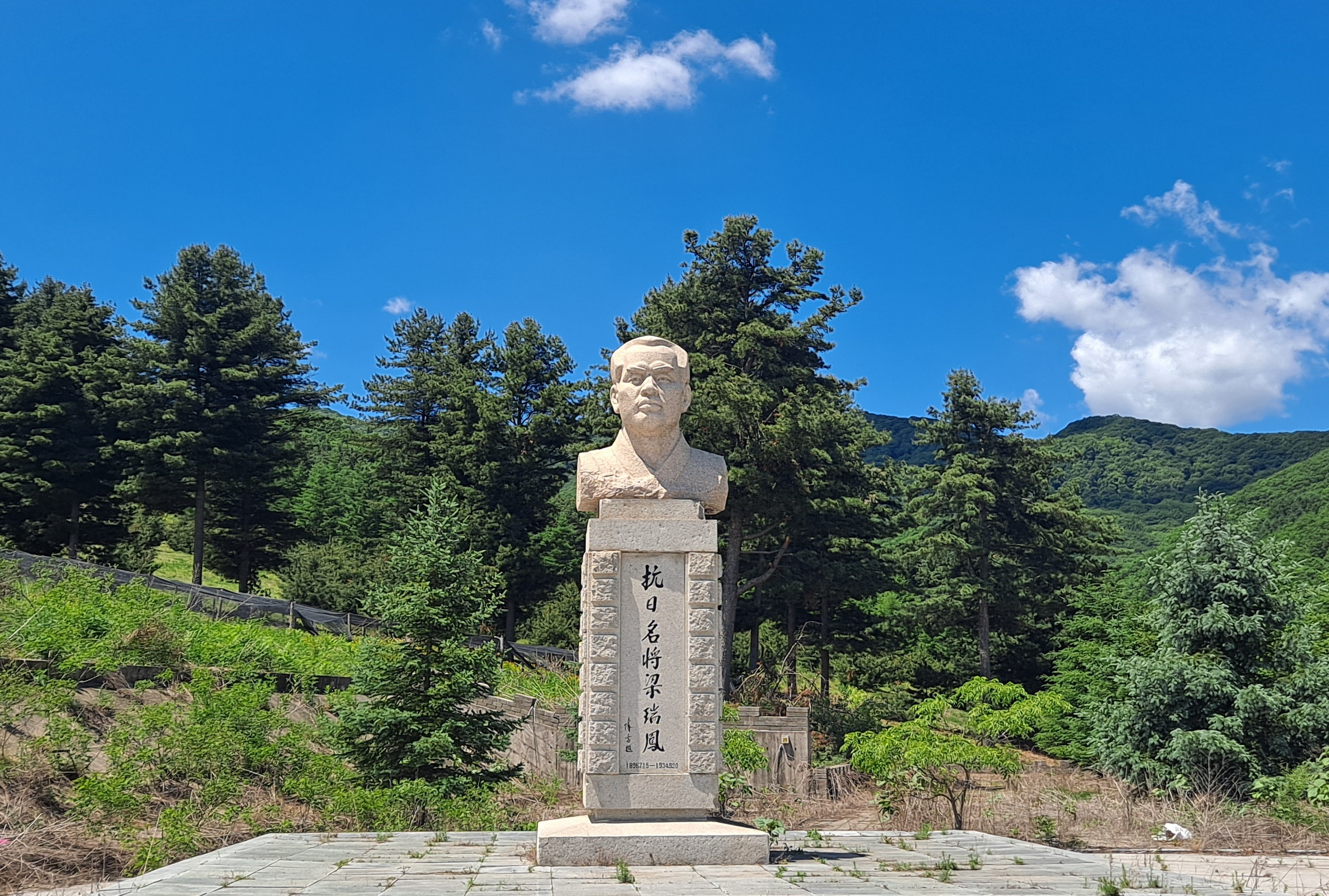
Statue of Yang Se-bong in Wangqingmen Town, Fushun China

Yang Se-bong is remembered in South Korea, North Korea, and China as unusual and special. He was an independence fighter who resisted Japan for the longest time and became the biggest target of the Japanese army. He was a commander who bought cigarettes for his soldiers and smoked leaf tobacco himself. However, the tolerance that Yang Se-bong practiced went well with any ideology.

=== Awards and memorials ===
In honor of his achievements, the South Korean government posthumously awarded him the Order of Merit for National Foundation in 1962. Although his resting place was unknown, Yang Se-bong's grave was buried at these sites below:

== See also ==
- Korean Independence Movement
- Korean Revolutionary Party
  - Korean Revolutionary Army
- List of militant Korean independence activist organizations
- List of Korean Independence activists
- General Staff Headquarters
- National People's Prefecture
