= Korean Independence Army (1929) =

1930–1933 arm of the Korean Independence Party

- 한국독립군 韓國獨立軍
- The emblem of the Korean Independence Army
- Founders: Kim Jwa-Jin X Ji Cheong-cheon
- Dates active: 1929 to 1933
- Headquarters: Korean People's Association in Manchuria (1932); Shanghai, Republic of China
- Status: Dissolved
- Size: 3,000
- Flag

The Korean Independence Army (Korean: 한국독립군) was the military branch of the Korean Independence Party, which was founded and was active in North Manchuria during the Japanese Occupation of Korea. Meanwhile, between 1929 and 1934, the Korean Revolutionary Army was separately organized and active in southern Manchuria under the Korean Revolutionary Party and the National People's Prefecture. Afterwards, the Korean Revolutionary Military Government (November 1934 – September 1938) was established.

== Subordinates of the Korean Independence Party ==
In July 1930, the Korean Independence Party (Korean Independence Party) was founded in the Korean People's Association in Manchuria and Saengyuksa (生育社), which were self-governing organizations for the Korean people in North Manchuria. The Korean Independence Party had six committees, and the Korean Independence Army was under the Korean Independence Party.

== Organization of the Korean Independence Army ==
The Korean Independence Army, commanded by General Kim Chwa-chin, formed the military of Shinmin Prefecture. Effectively a peasant militia, the army's experienced soldiers were supplemented by guerrillas, trained in the prefecture's military academy, with which the army waged guerrilla warfare against both the Empire of Japan and Soviet Union. It also established a Safety Unit (Korean: 치안대, romanized: Chiandae) and an Anti-Japanese Guerrilla Unit, in order to protect Koreans from local bandits and Imperial Japanese forces respectively.

=== Reorganization and battle of the Korean-Chinese Allied Forces ===
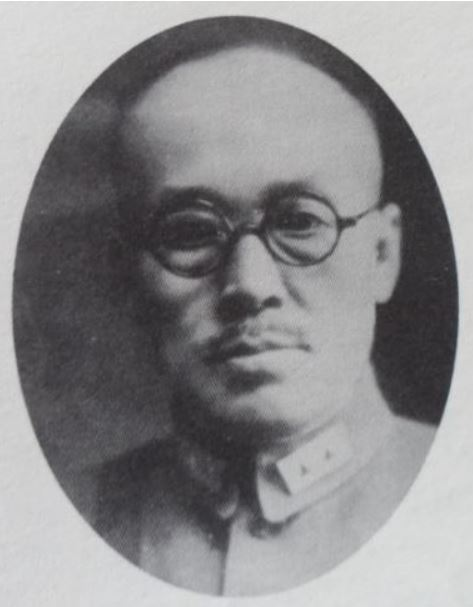
Ji Cheong-cheon, Commander-in-Chief of the Korean Independence Army

In September 1931, the year after the Korean Independence Party absorbed the remnants of the Korean Independence Army and reorganized its armed units. Japan accelerated its invasion of Manchuria by causing the Manchurian Incident, and the Japanese and Manchurian troops combined to invade northern Manchuria.

The Korean Independence Party established 26 military districts centered on the Middle East Railway in North Manchuria and fought against the Japanese.

- Commander-in-Chief: Ji Cheong-cheon
- Deputy Commander: Nam Dae-gwan
- Chief of Staff: Shin Sook
- Treasurer and diplomat Anyasan (安也山)
- Lee Gwang-un, leader of the volunteer army training group
- Volunteer Company Commander: Oh Gwang-seon
- Assassination Battalion Leader: Lee Chul- jeong
- Volunteer Platoon Commander: Lee Chun-jeong (李春正)
- Detached Battalion Commander: Han Gwang-bin (韓光彬)
- Bae Seong- woon, military police battalion commander
- Shin Won-gyun (申元均), communications unit and prosecutor
- Kwon Soo-jeong, Chairman of the National Salvation Support Association, and Jang Hong-jin, Secretary.
- Sim Jung-geun, leader of the Propaganda Corps
- Seo Il-bong (徐日鳳), Advisor and Chairman of the National Assembly of Korea

Accordingly, the Korean Independence Party issued a general mobilization order to each military district in November 1931 to focus all activities on the military and discuss joint Korean-Chinese operations with the Chinese authorities.

== Joint operation between Korea and China ==
Japan established Manchukuo, a puppet government, in 1932. The Imperial Japanese Army, jointly with the Manchukuo Imperial Army, launched a full-scale subjugation operation against the Korean Independence army. At this time, numerous Chinese military units advocating anti-Manchurian and anti-Japanese activities were organized in the Manchurian area and fought against the Japanese and Manchukuo armies. In these units, a part of the Zhang Haek-ryang army, a security guard group, or even some magic soldiers participated. In the Dunhua region, Wang Delin and Feng Jeonhae troops were stationed, in Heilongjiang region, Ma Zhanshan troops were stationed, and in Harbin, the commander of the Chinese Tiger Army, Zheng Chao, was stationed in Harbin. There was a unit led by Cho and a unit led by Goh Bong-rim, Brigadier General of the Horo Army, fighting against the Japanese Army.

Prior to this, on November 2, 1931, the Korean Independence Party set new activity goals in response to the Japanese occupation of Manchuria. On the 10th of the same month, the Korean Independence Party carried out convocation and recruitment activities through each military district, and on the 12th, it dispatched party and military representatives Shin Sook and Nam Dae -gwan to China's Jilin Self-Defense Force and the Huro County Combined Forces Headquarters to establish and appoint the military commander. They discussed joint Korean-Chinese operations with 3rd Army Commander Yang Mun-hwi (楊文揮) and Go Bong-rim. As a result, on December 11 of the same year, Ji Cheong-cheon, commander-in-chief of the Korean Independence Army, and executives including Choi Choi, Oh Gwang - seon, Shim Man-ho, Kim Cheong -nong, Choi Gwan-yong, and Choi Jong -won signed a mutual agreement with the Chinese military authorities was concluded.

The Korean Independence Army suffered a massive attack by 10,000 troops on February 12, 1932 while rushing to train soldiers and organize troops called up according to the general mobilization order. Although the unit had not yet been reorganized and the necessary equipment was not yet in place, the Ten Thousand Army defeated the Chinese army in the Harbin direction on February 5 and advanced along the Middle East Line under the cover of aircraft. The Korean-Chinese combined forces killed 10,000 people in places such as Wishaha, Ilmyeonpi, Ogilmil, Milocham, Dongbinbangjeong, and Uiran. There was a fierce battle with the army, but due to lack of food and ammunition, they suffered a crushing defeat and were dispersed. Ji Cheong-cheon, commander-in-chief of the Korean Independence Army, personally led Chief of Staff Shin Suk and Iljidaegun (一支隊軍) and fought a fierce battle in Uiran, but retreated to Tongha County (通河縣) in Heilongjiang Province and recovered the unit. Ahn Jong-seon, the commander of the separate unit, achieved a successful victory by temporarily recapturing the fortress on March 3 through a joint operation with the Gobongrim unit of the Chinese 3rd Tiger Army, but he was not able to hold the fortress for long, and Cha Cheol The 3rd, 4th, and 5th battalions led by (車澈), Ya Sang-gi (也相奇), and Jeon Buk-bin (全北賓) are led by the 3rd and 4th female commanders Yu Ji-gwang (劉志光) and Gung Yeong-mu (劉志光) of the Chinese Tiger Army. They fought for about a month, and then retreated to the northern region.

The Korean Independence Party held an emergency meeting in Moasan, Ssangseong County, and notified the Chinese Army's Gobongrim Unit to continue joint operations while rallying scattered independence forces. Within a month, the independence army was assembled, Kim Chang-hwan (金昌焕) was appointed as acting commander-in-chief, the troops were reorganized, and they began training. The Korean-Chinese Allied Forces, which had reorganized their forces, began full-scale joint operations in August 1932 .

=== Battle of Ssangseong ===
The Korean-Chinese combined forces, consisting of 3,000 independence troops and 25,000 Chinese troops, established a plan to attack Ssangseong Fortress. Ssangseongbo was a place of great strategic value as it was a key point of the Japjang Line railway and a distribution center for important products in Northern Manchuria. On September 3, when General Lee Cheong-cheon, commander-in-chief, led the troops from the Heilongjiang region, the independence army was reorganized and Kim Chang-hwan became deputy commander and marched toward Ssangseongbo on the 19th. Defeating the resistance of the Manchurian army during the march, they advanced about 200 ri in 3 days and arrived at Soseongja, 5 ri south of Ssangseongbo. There, by joining forces with the Chinese army's Gobongrim unit, the Chinese army decided to attack the east gate and the south gate, and the independence army decided to attack the west gate and then launched an attack. Inside the fortress, three brigades of the Manchurian army stubbornly resisted, but under the fierce attack of the independence army, most of them fled to the north gate and were killed by the Allied forces who had ambushed them in advance. With this victory, enough supplies were captured to sustain the Allied forces' 30,000 troops for three months.

In consideration of a counterattack by a large Japanese force, the Allied Forces moved the main force to Uga Dun (牛家屯), 5 ri outside of Ssangseongbo, and left a small number of troops in Ssangseong. As expected, a large unit of Japanese troops attacked the Ssangseong Fortress and the Ssangseong Fortress was taken over by the Japanese army. On November 7, the Allied forces divided the Independence Army and the Chinese Army into left and right wings and launched an operation to recapture Ssangseongbo. The independence army organized 15 units of 200 men and advanced from the vanguard, and the Chinese army provided ammunition and food. An all-out attack began at 6 p.m., with one unit charging to the front, one unit to the left, one unit to the rear, and a machine gun unit to the center. The enemy stubbornly resisted with grenades and mortars for several hours, but the independence army that entered the fortress disrupted the enemy camp, and the independence army artillery, which occupied the mountain behind Ssangseongbo, shelled the main buildings of the city. After a fierce battle, all Manchurian soldiers surrendered and opened the gates. In this battle, one Japanese company was annihilated. The Allied forces, who recaptured Ssangseongbo for the second time, immediately organized their loot and prepared for an enemy counterattack.

On November 20, the Japanese army launched a retaliatory battle as usual. The main force of the Japanese army and the large forces of the Manchurian army stationed in Harbin and Changchun counterattacked under the cover of aircraft. Accordingly, the friendly forces divided their entire force into seven units and established defense lines at each strategic point to prevent the Japanese army's counterattack. A fierce battle took place over the course of a day and night, and casualties continued to mount among both sides. On the night of the 21st, the Japanese army launched an all-out attack. The friendly forces' defense line began to shake, and the enemy's aircraft attacks and artillery fire finally collapsed the defense line. The independence army continued its resistance until dawn on the 22nd, but the morale of the Chinese army gradually declined and they were forced to give up the castle to the enemy and retreat about 500 ri, staying at Chunghajin (冲河鎭) in Osang-hyeon. Not only did the independence army suffer enormous damage in this battle, but the Gobongrim unit alone held ceasefire talks with the enemy army. Although the independence army did its best to dissuade this, the Gobongrim unit continued to negotiate a ceasefire. Accordingly, the Independence Army took independent action on the 27th of the same month.

The Korean Independence Party decided on its future action plan on November 29. The Independence Party dispatched three representatives to Wang Deok-rim, Commander-in-Chief of the National Salvation Army, and also sent a separate representative to Nanjing to discuss joint Korea-China operations with the Chinese government. On December 25, the Korean Independence Army joined forces with the Chinese army and fought a fierce battle with 2,000 Manchurian guerrillas at Gyeongbak Lake, annihilating them. The Manchurian army pursuing the Allied forces was ambushed on both sides of Gyeongbak Lake, and when the Manchurian army entered the entrance of the lake, they took advantage of it and attacked from both sides.

=== Battle of Sadohaja ===
Until March 1933, the independence army was busy training, strengthening the troops stationed in Sadohaja. The independence army was strengthened day by day, and the Japanese army joined forces with the Manchurian army to attack in order to annihilate the independence army at once. On April 14, when the Independence Army learned that a large unit of the Ten Thousand Army was attacking, they decided to surround and annihilate the enemy like the Chinese army. They divided the entire unit into four units, with the 1st Route Army using small units to lure the enemy, and the 2nd and 3rd Route Army attacking the three provinces. They were ordered to wait at the watershed behind the Three Rivers and in the valleys on the left and right of Sado River, and the 4th Route Army was placed in ambush at the entrance to the Two Islands River to block the enemy's retreat route and take away the enemy's transport vehicles.

In the early morning of the 15th, the enemy advanced with a force of about one division from Huangga Dun (黃家屯) to Sadohaja via the direction of Idoha. The enemy had been caught up in our troops' operation. When our troops, who had been waiting, opened their guns and attacked in unison, the majority of the enemy troops fell in an instant without even being able to respond, and the remnants of the defeated soldiers fled through the darkness. Our troops' losses were minimal, and the enemy abandoned a large number of weapons and ammunition throughout the year. On the evening of the 16th, our troops organized their units, collected loot, and returned to the main unit. And on May 2, our army sent guerrillas to various places and made a surprise attack on the 10,000-strong army, annihilating the enemy in over 20 battles.

=== Battle of Donggyeongseong ===
The Korean-Chinese combined forces took advantage and planned an attack on Yeonganseong (寧安城) and attacked Donggyeongseong (東京城) first. The units were organized into three units: the 1st Route Army was organized into a cavalry unit and advanced into the valley along the Dongmokdan River to attack the enemy's support units, while the 2nd Route Army consisted of one brigade and was sent to Yeongan. It was deployed at the midpoint between the castle and Tokyo Castle to first cut bridges and wires to block enemy reinforcements, and the 3rd Route Army was divided into left and right wings to attack Tokyo Castle directly.

On the night of June 3, we attacked Tokyo Castle as planned. After a three-hour battle, the Japanese army was annihilated by the ambush of the right army while fleeing through the North Gate, and the entire Manchurian army surrendered, with only Brigadier General Kwak Se-jae fleeing with a few guards. The victorious Korean-Chinese allied forces entered the fortress, reassured the residents, and captured more loot than during the Battle of Sadohaja. It was not feasible to immediately attack Yeonganseong Fortress, where a large army was stationed, so the main force was moved to the mountainous area between Wangqing and Dongnyeong.

=== Battle of Daejeonjaryeong ===
On June 28, 1933, the entire Korean-Chinese Allied Forces advanced through Nosongnyeong, and the Japanese troops stationed in Daejeonja were rushing to attack the Allied forces. The Allied forces stationed their troops at Nomoje River, 5 ri from Daejeonja. The Allied forces found out that the Japanese army would pass through Daejeonjaryeong on July 3 and completed the deployment of troops at key points in Daejeonjaryeong by 6 p.m. on the 2nd. The topography of Daejeonjaryeong is a two-character rugged hill with a valley about 20 li in length, and on either side of it is a deep mountainous jungle area with cliffs hundreds of meters high. The friendly forces deployed here included 2,500 Independence Army soldiers and 6,000 Chinese soldiers. All of the Independence Army and 2,000 Chinese soldiers were organized into the vanguard unit, and the Independence Army was in charge of the main attack. When the defenseless Japanese army crossed halfway to Daejeonjaryeong, where the Korean-Chinese allied forces were ambushed, and the end of the procession reached the mountainside, the allied forces launched an attack all at once. The Japanese soldiers, who were unexpectedly attacked, collapsed without even being able to respond properly. After four hours of fierce fighting, the Japanese army was annihilated except for a very small number. The victory in the Battle of Daejeon was an unprecedented victory in the history of the Korean independence army's anti-Japanese battle. In this battle, a huge amount of loot was obtained.

=== Limitations of the Korean-Chinese combined forces ===
The independence army, which had rested for about two months and strengthened its strength, attacked the Japanese army in Dongnyeong County alone on September 1. This operation was originally a battle in which the Chinese army promised to send a follow-up unit soon. Although the independence army engaged in fierce fighting with the Japanese army for about three days, the Chinese follow-up unit did not arrive. As time passed, the damage to the independence army increased and they eventually retreated. The reason why the Chinese National Salvation Army did not send a follow-up unit was because communists who had infiltrated the unit of the first commander of the Chinese National Salvation Army, Wu Eui-seong, caused a separation between the Korean-Chinese Allied Forces, and the feelings between the two armies were not very good in the process of distributing the loot captured from the enemy. After the Battle of Dongbin County, the discord between the Korean and Chinese armies worsened, and the Chinese army arrested and detained dozens of executives under the commander-in-chief of the independence army and confiscated the independence army's weapons, leading to the collapse of the Korea-China alliance.

== See also ==
- Korean Independence Movement
  - List of militant Korean independence activist organizations
- Korean Independence Party
- Northeast Anti-Japanese United Army

== Works cited ==
- Gelderloos, Peter (2010). "How will decisions be made?". Anarchy Works. San Francisco: Ardent Press. pp. 48–66. OCLC 748435918.
- Hirsch, Steven; van der Walt, Lucien (2010). "Rethinking Anarchism and Syndicalism: the Colonial and Postcolonial Experience, 1870–1940". Anarchism and Syndicalism in the Colonial and Postcolonial World, 1870–1940. Studies in Global Social History. Vol. 6. Leiden: Brill. pp. xxxi–lxxiii. ISBN 978-90-04-18849-5. ISSN 1874-6705. OCLC 1200925424.
- Hwang, Dongyoun (2016). "Experimenting Place-Based Anarchism in Manchuria". Anarchism in Korea: Independence, Transnationalism, and the Question of National Development, 1919–1984 (PDF). Albany, New York: SUNY Press. pp. 48–55. ISBN 978-1-4384-6167-0. OCLC 1039293708.
- Schmidt, Michael (2013). Cartography of Revolutionary Anarchism. Edinburgh: AK Press. ISBN 9781849351386. OCLC 881111188.
