= Ha Ki-rak =

Korean anarchist (1912–1997)

- 하기락
- Born: 26 January 1912; Kan'yō, Keishōnan-dō
- Died: 3 February 1997 (aged 85); South Korea
- Education: Waseda University
- Occupation: Academic

Ha Ki-rak (Korean: 하기락; 1912–1997) was a Korean historian, political philosopher and anarchist activist. A student activist in the Korean independence movement, he went on to become a leading figure in the anarchist movement in South Korea. He led a number of Korean anarchist organisations and led protests at Kyungpook National University during the April Revolution. During the years of the Fourth Republic of Korea, he established a number of organisations, and wrote and translated works on anarchism. He then participated in the re-organisation of the Korean anarchist movement following the country's transition to democracy.

== Biography ==
Ha Ki-Rak was born in 1912. As a student, he became involved in the Korean independence movement, and in 1929, he participated in the Gwangju Student Independence Movement. During this period of anti-imperialist unrest, Ha and Jang Hyeon-Jeek organised an anarchist group at Chung-Ang University, under the influence of leading Korean anarchist Yi Jeong-gyu. He later moved to Japan, where he studied at Waseda University and was active in the Workers' League of Tokyo (도쿄 동흥 노동 동맹). Following the Surrender of Japan at the end of World War II, in 1945, Ha returned to Korea, which was now liberated from Japanese occupation. There he established the newly-independent country's first anarchist organisation, the League of Free Social Constructors (자유사회 건설자 연맹).

In February 1946, Ha participated in a conference of Korean anarchists at the Geumgang Temple in Busan, where Ha gave the opening speech. The conference resolved to establish a unified national organisation to participate in the reconstruction of an independent Korea. They consequently established the Independent Workers and Farmers Party (독립노농당; IWFP) and Ha became editor-in-chief of its journal, Libertarian Federation (자유연합).

The IWFP collapsed during the Korean War, as many of its members were killed, kidnapped or disappeared, with only its sections in Daegu and Busan surviving. In October 1952, Ha organised the Special Committee of North Gyeongsang Province, with himself as its chairperson. But due to his professorship at Kyungpook National University, Ha was not actively involved in the organisation's activities. During the April Revolution of 1960, Ha led protests against President Syngman Rhee at Kyunpook University, which led to the establishment of the Second Republic of Korea.

After the proclamation of the Fourth Republic of Korea in 1972, some civil liberties were restored in South Korea and political activities were allowed to resume. That year, Ha Ki-Rak established the Korean Anarchist Federation (한국 자주인 연맹) in the South Korean capital of Seoul. He also participated in the establishment of the Democratic Unification Party (민주통일당; DUP), led by Yang Il-dong, with Ha as leader of its policy committee. In 1978, Ha published his History of the Korean Anarchist Movement. After the establishment of the Fifth Republic of Korea, under Chun Doo-hwan, the DUP was forcibly dissolved. Ha's translations of the works of Mikhail Bakunin, Karl Marx and others were banned by the new government. An English language translation of Ha's History of the Korean Anarchist Movement was published in 1986.

Following the restoration of democracy in South Korea, in 1987, Ha organised a national anarchist conference in Daegu; the following year, he organised the International Seminar for World Peace in Seoul. He attempted to re-establish an anarchist political party, but he was ultimately unsuccessful. In 1995, Ha organised the World Peace Conference in Seoul. He died in 1997.

== Selected works ==
Own writings

- A History of the Korean Anarchist Movement (1978)
- Shin Chae-ho as Anarchist (1980)
- The Will for the Self-liberation of the People (1980)
- The Conquest (1985)

Translations

- The Unknown Revolution by Volin (1973)
- Anarchism by George Woodcock (1973)
- Mutual Aid: A Factor of Evolution by Peter Kropotkin (1982)
- Fields, Factories and Workshops by Peter Kropotkin (1983)
- God and the State by Mikhail Bakunin (1983)
- Early Writings by Karl Marx (1983)
- The Preconditions of Socialism or Evolutionary Socialism by Eduard Bernstein (1984)
- Anarchism by Daniel Guérin (1986)

== Bibliography ==
- Crump, John (1996). "Anarchism and Nationalism in East Asia". Anarchist Studies. 4: 45–64. ISSN 0967-3393.
- Ha, Ki-rak (1986). A History of Korean Anarchist Movement. Anarchist Publishing Committee. OCLC 32236908.
- Hirsch, Steven J.; van der Walt, Lucien (2010). "Rethinking Anarchism and Syndicalism: the colonial and postcolonial experience, 1870–1940". In Hirsch, Steven J.; van der Walt, Lucien (eds.). Anarchism and Syndicalism in the Colonial and Postcolonial World, 1870–1940. Studies in Global Social History. Vol. 6. Leiden: Brill. pp. xxxi–lxxiii. ISBN 9789004188495. OCLC 868808983.
- Oh, Jang-Whan (2011). "Ha Ki-Rak (1912–1997)". In Ness, Immanuel (ed.). The International Encyclopedia of Revolution and Protest. doi:10.1002/9781405198073.wbierp1786. ISBN 9781405198073.
