= National People's Government =

1924–1934 autonomous prefecture in China

- 1929–1934
- Flag
- Motto: Eradicating Japanese imperialism and achieving Korea's absolute independence
- Status: Historically unrecognized autonomous prefecture
- Capital: Xingyeong (de facto)
- Common languages: Korean
- Demonym: Korean
- Government: Self-governing cooperative organization
- Chairman of the Central Executive Committee
  - 1929–1931: Hyeon Ik-cheol
  - 1931–1934: Kim Ho-seok
- Legislature: Central Council (September–December 1929); Revolutionary Assembly (December 1929)
- Historical era: Interwar period
  - Government formed: April 1, 1929
  - Disestablished: April 1934
Preceded by
Republic of China
Korean People's Association in Manchuria
Righteous Government
Succeeded by
State of Manchuria
- Today part of: China

Korean name
- Hangul: 국민부
- Hanja: 國民府
- RR: Gungminbu
- MR: Kungminbu

The National People's Government (Korean: 국민부) was an organization of the Korean independence movement group and a self-governing autonomous prefecture in Manchuria that Korean refugees populated in April 1929.

At the end of 1920, various anti-Japanese groups and corps in Dongsamseong, which did not surrender to the Japanese army's Gando Massacre and recovered, carried out anti-Japanese warfare externally with their affiliated independence forces while actively developing mutual integration movements internally. As a result, in August 1922, the Korean Unification Government was formed in southern Manchuria. On this basis, by March 1925, the three organizations of the General Staff Headquarters (參議府), the Righteous Government (正義府), and the Korean People's Association in Manchuria, which had been active in disparate ways in North and South Manchuria, were integrated into Heunggyeong (新賓縣), Sinbin-Hyeon, Liaoning Province. The three divisions established in this way have a dual character: an administrative agency that enforces the autonomy of the Korean community, which is the basis of the independence movement in Northeast China, and a military government agency that is in charge of command, training, and operations of the independence army. The National People's Prefecture's headquarters was established in Xingyeong.

== Background ==
Around 1927, the three branches of Manchuria had their sphere of influence, and the Korean community was developing a movement for autonomy and independence. The coast of the Yalu River is under the jurisdiction of General Staff Headquarters, the area around Jilin and Bongcheon-province in southern Manchuria is under the jurisdiction of Righteous Government, and the area along the Jungdong Line in northern Manchuria is under the jurisdiction of the Korean People's Association in Manchuria. Although it was a government, the highest goal was the country's independence through the ‘war of independence theory.’ Meanwhile, to unite all the capabilities of the people in Manchuria necessary for the national independence movement and wage a more effective anti-Japanese war, even the complete integration of the three autonomous regions of Manchuria, which were established and active separately in North and South Manchuria, had to be achieved as soon as possible. Moreover, since the establishment of the three prefectures, the Japanese government had been taking advantage of the lethargy of the Republic of China and the pro-Japanese tendencies to more actively invade Manchuria while making every effort to suppress anti-Japanese Koreans, so the integration of the three autonomous regions was a more urgent task. It was then, influenced by the movement for a single national party that began to develop within China in July 1926, the integration of the three prefectures also began to be discussed.

== Integration Meetings ==
To unite all the capabilities of Koreans living in Manchuria necessary for the national independence movement and fight against Japanese imperialism, even the unification of the three divisions in North and South Manchuria had to be achieved as soon as possible. Moreover, since the establishment of the three branches, the Japanese imperialists had been taking advantage of the lethargy of the Chinese Nationalist government and the pro-Japanese tendencies of the Jangjakrim warlords in the eastern Samseong province to invade Manchuria while making every effort to oppress Koreans more actively. Hence, the unification of the three branches was an even more urgent issue.

=== First Integration Meeting ===
As such, the unification of the three branches, which required cooperation from the beginning of the establishment of the three branches, was finally concreted by the following resolution of the 4th Central Committee of the Ministry of Justice in August 1927.

1. We will actively promote union with the Shinminbu and Chamuibu to unify the Manchurian Movement.
2. Prepare for the unification of the entire national movement.

The desire to form a single party as a method of unifying the three branches was a typical public opinion discussed among independence activists at home and abroad at the time, and the 'two parties' system was established as a single ideology due to the influence of various trends that prevailed after World War I. It was intended to achieve the purpose of independence as a method of 'maneuvering.' This One-Party Movement began in earnest with the formation of the 'Great Independence One-Party Promotion Association' in Beijing in 1926, and after that, the One-Party Movement became active in various parts of the country and abroad. Thus, in 1927, Singanhoe was formed in Korea, and a new phase unfolded in the national independence movement.

==== National Unity Movement ====
Several unified councils were under the leadership of the General Staff Headquarters in Jilin and Banseok, Manchuria, and this issue was seriously discussed. The first was a meeting held for 15 days from May 12, 1928, to the 26th of the same month, with 39 representatives of 18 organizations, including the General Staff Headquarters, including Kim Dong-sam and Hyun Jeong-gyeong, as well as Park Geon-gyeom and others from Beijing, to organize a single national party was held. They gathered to discuss the issue of forming a single party for the Korean people in Manchuria. Still, there was a conflict between the positions of organizing around existing organizations and those of disbanding and reorganizing all existing organizations in terms of construction methods. Kim Dong-sam, a member of the General Staff Headquarters, gathered at Shinandun, 7 miles west of Giljangyeon-ro, and attempted to form a single party to unify the three divisions but failed.

At this time, the representative of the General Staff Headquarters returned midway due to the severe crackdown by the Chinese and Japanese forces, and the representative of the Shinmin Prefecture arrived after the meeting ended and was unable to attend the plenary session. However, representatives of various organizations gathered from different parts of Manchuria set as specific agendas the method of struggle against Japan based on the world situation, the issue of forming a single party, and various other issues related to the military, finance, politics, education, labor, youth, etc. However, the meeting did not proceed smoothly and was divided as follows. This is because there were conflicting opinions on how to form a single party, such as group-oriented organization theory, group-oriented organization theory, individual-oriented organization theory, etc., and the two sides fought tightly, with some insisting on organizing a 'council' and others 'promoting council.' am. In addition, some did not participate in this meeting from the beginning and tried to form an 'established association.'

Those who advocate for the 'Council' are 11 organizations, including the General Staff Headquarters, Yaksan Workers' Union, and Damuldan, which claim or support group-oriented or group-centered organization theory, and they are 'preparing a single national party. We will actively strive to complete the Korean Independence Movement, the legacy of our revolutionary predecessors. By discussing matters such as ‘extracting common political complaints from all levels of the nation and concentrating the only national party,’ they sought to build a united front with national liberation and independence as the top goal.

==== Innovation Council ====
In September 1928, a three-part integrated conference was held under the auspices of the General Staff Headquarters. However, the meeting eventually collapsed as differences in positions on integration could not be resolved. Thus, on November 15 of that year, the Kim Dong-sam and Ji Cheong-cheon factions of the Righteous Government, the Military Government Committee of the Shinmin Prefecture, and the Kim Seung-hak faction of the General Staff Headquarters gathered together to form the Innovation Council. Afterwards, the military faction of the Shinmin Prefecture, the mainstream faction of the General Staff Headquarters, and the secessionist faction of the Righteous Government which had been advocating disbanding and reorganizing existing organizations through the National Unity Party Promotion Association, organized the Innovation Council in December 1928.

The side advocating for the Innovation Council were seven organizations, including the South Manchurian Youth Alliance and the North Manchuria Youth General Alliance, which advocated the complete dismantlement of established organizations with local and factional characteristics and the theory of individual-based organization. Their opinion was to organize a single national party to defeat Japanese imperialism and build a new nation where everyone would be politically and economically equal. Both sides' arguments were unable to reach a compromise even though the meeting lasted for 15 days, and the plenary session was adjourned. Afterward, the two sides held separate meetings in different places to solidify their respective claims while forming the 'National Unity Party Organization Council' and the 'National Unity Party Organization Promotion Association,' further intensifying the conflict.

Since this innovation council aimed to establish a unified military government, its duration was limited to one year. Kim Dong-sam, Hwang Hak-soo, Ji Cheong-cheon, Kim Seung-hak, and 16 other members were elected as central executive committee members, including Chairman Kim Dong-sam and the central executive committee chairman. It had departments and executives such as Kim Won-jik, Military Committee Chairman Hwang Hak-su, Military Committee Chairman Ji Cheong-cheon, and Civil Affairs Committee Chairman Kim Seung-hak. In addition, the administrative districts for Korean self-governance were designated as Namil-gu for the Wonchamuibu jurisdiction, Jungil-gu, and Bukil-gu for the Jeonminminbu jurisdiction to govern the entire Manchuria. After reorganizing this system, the Innovation Council focused on purging pro-Japanese factions. It significantly destroyed Japanese colonial institutions such as the Seonminbu and the Korean Community Association until they were disbanded in May 1929.

As described above, the Chosunghoe side organized the Innovation Council to continue the national movement. It also organized the 'United National Party Remanufacturer Association' to succeed and complete the formation of a unique national party, which had been a long-standing task. Kim Dong-sam was appointed as the chairman of the central executive committee, and Kim Jwa-jin and Kim Seong-gyo were appointed co-committee members, respectively. After setting the following policy, the front and back of the Innovation Council became one and focused on promoting a single party.

1. Mobilize the general constituents and make them strive for the party's collective foundation.
2. Develop theories about the revolution in Joseon to sort out the inherent contradictions of the Manchurian movement and make efforts to prepare for the formation of a great party.
3. Even before the establishment of the Great Party, prevent the intrusion of vicious demonic beasts during the transition period and exclude the so-called active policy of invading the Manchurian Empire.

=== Second Integration Meeting ===
Next, the second meeting for the integration of the three autonomous division was held in Jilin in October of the same year as a meeting of the three division led by the Righteous Government, which supported the council and attended by representatives of the Council of Ministers and the New People's Ministry to establish conditions for integration discussions to begin in earnest. However, soon after their meeting, difficult issues such as conflict of opinion between different factions, a dispute over the right of a representative of the Shinmin Prefecture, and recall of the representative of the Council of Councilors became entangled, making it impossible for a formal meeting to be properly held. Accordingly, the General Staff Headquarters tried to reach a compromise by holding a 'meeting of Jaegil activists' as an alternative, but this also failed. The reason for the collapse of the integrated conference is that, firstly, due to the conflicting opinions of each faction, the Shinmin and General Staff Headquarters sides decided to completely disband the Shinmin, General Staff Headquarters, and Righteous Government and break down the dispute in the Grand Council of the Provincial Council and implement a defense of the general jeonman general. In response to the argument for the naturalization of Korean immigrants and the acquisition of autonomy, the General Staff Headquarters adhered to the so-called group-centered organization theory of promoting a single party while leaving the various organizations as they were at the time, so the two parties were unable to reach a compromise in the end. Second, in the New People's Government, both the Military Government Committee and the Civil Administration Committee dispatched their respective representatives, which led to an argument called the Representation Rights Struggle, in which each party accused the other of being reactionary and claimed that Jafar was the official representative of the New People's Government. Third, after dispatching representatives, infighting broke out in the General Staff Headquarters, causing the issue of recalling all of the dispatched representatives. Although the unification of the three branches was the consistent wish of all independence activists at the time, the Jilin Conference was divided in this way, making complete integration of the national movement in Manchuria more difficult.

== History ==
The Minjeong faction of the Shinmin Prefecture, the remnants of the General Staff Headquarters, and the majority faction of the Righteous Government formed the National Unity Party Organizational Alliance in January 1929. The 'National Unity Party Organization Alliance' launched itself as the parent body of the National People's Prefecture as an independent, autonomous government for Koreans, focused on its next goal, forming a unique party. The National Unique Party Organizational Alliance would carry out the independence movement project, and the independence forces under the prefecture would be subordinated to the organizational alliance. In March 1929, representatives of Jeongui Prefecture Lee Dong-rim, Hyeon Ik-cheol, Go Icheo, Ko Yu-sin, Choi Dong-wook, Lee Taek, General Staff Headquarters representatives Shim Yong-jun, Lim Byeong-mu, and Yoo Gwang-geol, and Shin Min-bu representatives Lee Hyo-won gathered again in Jilin Province and held the second Sambu. An integrated meeting was held. Although there was no overall attendance from Chokseonghoe and others, the unification of the three branches was absolute for the national movement in Manchuria.

=== Founding ===
After repeated discussions on April 1, 1929, the National People's Government was established. While opposing the Prefecture's Chaejinhoe, Hyeon Ik-cheol succeeded Sambu and took charge of the independence movement in Manchuria and autonomous administration. The National People's Prefecture was created as the provisional government of Manchuria and an independent organization for the self-governance of Koreans living in Manchuria. Afterward, the prefecture moved its central headquarters to Henggyeong, Xinbin County, Liaodong Province. It held the first Central Council on September 27 of that year, separating civil administration from military administration and reorganizing it into a central organization responsible for the autonomy and industry of Koreans living in Korea. This policy reorganized the National People's Prefecture into a purely autonomous institution. In December of that year, the National Unity Party Organizational Alliance was also reorganized into the Korean Revolutionary Party and formed the Korean Revolutionary Army. All matters related to the independence movement and the military were decided to be promoted by the Korean Revolutionary Party and the Korean Revolutionary Army.

Accordingly, three organizations were established: the National People's Government, the Korean Revolutionary Party, and the Korean Revolutionary Army. With the Korean Revolutionary Party leading the organization and operation of these three organizations, a two-party ruling system similar to China was established. On the other hand, the armed struggle for independence was promoted centered around the newly organized Korean Revolutionary Party and the Korean Revolutionary Army.

In response to this, the Civil Affairs Committee of the Shinmin Prefecture, the Sim Yong-jun (沈龍俊) affiliate of the General Staff Headquarters, and Hyeon Ik-cheol (玄益哲) and Go hal-shin (aka Gohal-shin), affiliates of the Righteous Government filed the Military Government Committee in April 1929. The Innovation Council was subsequently disbanded due to a lack of activity. In May that year, the Ministry of Finance formed a Central Executive Committee and established each department and its person in charge. He participated in the conference faction during the movement to form a single national party. It is an organization organized by nationalists, including the majority faction, in Jilin in April 1929. At the time of founding, Hyeon Ik-cheol was the chairman of the central executive committee, and 23 primary executive committee members were also appointed. Lee Woong, head of the military department, served as the Korean Revolutionary Army commander. His headquarters also moved from Jilin to Henggyeong.

=== Three Divisions Unification Conference ===
On September 20, 1929, the first Central Committee revised the program and deleted the mission of revolution. The Central Committee also adopted a declaration and charter. Accordingly, the platform and charter enacted at the Three-Ministry Unification Conference in March of that year were revised to delete phrases such as 'for Korea's independence' and 'military department' and to 'improve the culture of the Korean people in Manchuria, industrial development, and public security and self-defense.' It was only said that ‘the sole duty is to do this.’ Also, instead of abolishing the Military Department among the central organizations, it was decided to establish the Public Security Department and the Secret Service at each strategic location.

The Three-Party Unification Conference in Jilin collapsed due to the conflict between the council and the Provincial Council; the two sides took different paths, promoting a single party and establishing a military government. First, the Shuchenghoe met in Jilin in late December of that year and organized the 'Innovation Council.' The Innovation Council, promoted by the Military Government Committee of the New People's Department, the Kim Hui-san faction of the General Staff Headquarters, and the Kim Dong-sam, Kim Sang-deok, Kim Won-jik, and Lee Cheong-cheon sections who withdrew from the Righteous Government following the breakdown of the Three-Party Unification Conference, declared the dissolution of the New People's Government and the General Staff Headquarters in their name. In addition to the autonomy of Koreans, the main project goals were in four areas: active assistance in promoting the Great Tang Dynasty, military election and prevention of enemy invasions, organization of legal Chinese local self-government institutions, and handling of leftover affairs. After the collapse of the Three-Divisions Unification Conference in Jilin, the Jeongui Prefecture, the Civil Affairs Committee of the New People's Government, and the council including Shim Yong-jun of the General Staff Headquarters' Ministry of Justice requested the formation of a unified autonomous government and the construction of a single party in response to the above-mentioned 'United National Party Remand Promotion Association'.

=== Internal Strife ===
The Korean Revolutionary Army and the Korean Revolutionary Party, which supported the National People's Prefecture activities, were weakened by internal strife between socialists and nationalists. In October 1929, the Korean Revolutionary Army attacked the South Korean Youth General Alliance, inciting the Nanman disaster that killed six executives who opposed the National People's Government. The prefecture showed signs of division due to left-right opposition as left-wing organizations formed The Alliance to Overthrow Imperialism. In December 1929, they left the prefecture and formed the Korean Revolutionary Army Gilgang Command to oppose them. The Korean Revolutionary Party took full charge of the administration, while the Korean Revolutionary Army commanded authority over the party. As roles were divided between the parties, a two-party governance system was established with the party as the center.

However, due to the National People's Government's enlightenment movement, hundreds of independence fighters were produced and later led the independence movement. In April 1930, he founded "The Korean Revolution" as an organ magazine and published "Bonghwa at the provincial Nanman Academy, showing the political and ideological enlightenment. On the other hand, certain limitations and problems can be pointed out, such as internal conflict in the early stages of its establishment, suppression of socialist forces, and the burden it places on the people by taking the form of a ruling group.

=== Invasion of Manchuria ===
In 1931, Japan, as a means of realizing its ambition to invade Manchuria, caused the so-called Wanpaoshan Incident to drive a wedge between the Korean and Chinese peoples. At this time, the National People's Government declared that this incident was the result of Japan's evil conspiracy and made every effort to resolve the situation. After the Manchurian Incident, when Japan occupied all of Manchuria, some leading figures defected and left the National People's Government. In addition, the socialists caused internal strife, which fell into chaos, but the situation was soon brought under control, and the battle line was reorganized. In September 1931, Japan invaded Manchuria. In January 1932, the department's factions attended the central committee meeting hosted by the Korean Revolutionary Party and discussed response measures. On January 20, 1932, Japanese police raided the Central Committee, and 19 executives were arrested. In 1932, a joint Korean-Chinese operation was established through a joint meeting with the Korean Revolutionary Army and jointly fought the Battle of Yonglingga and the Battle of Heunggyeongseong by joining forces with the Chinese Volunteer Army, China's anti-Manchurian and anti-Japanese army. He won a great victory in the Battle of Gyeongseong and the Battle of Nogu.

=== Dissolution ===
After the establishment of Manchukuo in 1932, the Japanese Empire suppressed the independence movement on a large scale and strengthened its crackdown on the Korean community in Manchuria. As a result, the National People's Government virtually ceased functioning properly.

== Governance ==
The National People's Government declared itself the 'government' and sought to implement the ideology of modern democracy through the separation of powers. Of course, it was true that it had its problems and limitations of the times. However, while the Shanghai Provisional Government in the first half of the 1930s remained a nominal government, the Kookmin Ministry was a semi-autonomous government that performed state functions. In this sense, the fact that the National People's Government established mutual relations with the Korean Revolutionary Party and the Korean Revolutionary Army and was the only one in the Manchuria region to fight under the banner of Korea's independence and revolution.

=== Principles ===
At the time of its formation, the government ratified a declaration and charter that set out the following principles:

1. Concentrate the revolutionary capabilities of the entire nation on the sole national party.
2. Realize a unified self-governing organization to promote life stability for compatriots living in the community.
3. Responsible for ensuring immediate combat and public security in organizing the national single party and autonomous institutions.

=== Central Executive Committee ===
The National People's Government formed the Central Executive Committee on May 28, 1929, with Hyeon Ik-cheol as Chairman of the Central Executive Committee, Kim I-Dae as Chairman of the Civil Affairs Committee, Choi Dong-Oh as Chairman of the Foreign Affairs Committee, and Koi as Chairman of the Education Committee. Heo (高而虛) and Lee Woong (李雄) as military committee chairman and commander, and Yang Se-bong (梁世奉) as 1st company commander were elected. The headquarters was moved from Jilin to Xinbin County, Liaoning Province, in June. Japanese influence in Jilin Province strengthened, and activities became difficult. The headquarters was also moved from Jilin to Henggyeong in the Daedun region. The first Central Committee was held on September 20, 1929, and a declaration, platform, and charter were adopted, and the Central Executive Committee was reorganized on the 27th. As a result, it was decided that the National People's Prefecture would be solely responsible for the autonomous administration of the jurisdictional region.

=== Central Council ===
On September 20, 1929, the 1st Central Council was held by the principle of a two-party governance system similar to China's. The revolutionary work was delegated to a single national party organization. It was decided only to take charge of functions.

==== Korean Revolutionary Party ====
The Korean Revolutionary Party carried out a dual-party operation to achieve Korea's independence with the same theory and method by gathering all the national capabilities. It later became the only party that supported and fostered the National People's Government. The factions within the party were socialists and nationalists who advocated for socialist logic. The Korean Revolutionary Army served as its armed wing until December of the same year. The Central Party Department of the Korean Revolutionary Party is located in Liaodong Province, the location of the National People's Prefecture, and separately, the Jilin and Heilongjiang Provinces have organized the 'Jihei Special Committee,' as well as sub-organizations such as the Catholic Party Department in each province and the County Party Department in each county, with over 100 units. Each prefecture had a branch party, and such branch parties were expanded to Korea. They were established in Pyeongan, Hwanghae, Gangwon, Chungcheong, Jeolla, and Gyeongsang Province, and organizational members joined in and carried out operational activities. Meanwhile, the Central Party Department and the Gilheuk Special Committee organized into seven departments, including the Central Department, Secretariat Department, Organization Department, Education Department, Economic Department, International Department, and People's Department, and three committees, including the Military Committee, Autonomy Committee, and Propaganda Committee.

==== Reorganization ====
The Revolutionary Assembly was formed in December 1929, and the Korean Revolutionary Party was in charge of making the prefecture a single-party region.

=== Military ===
Flag of the Korean Revolutionary Army

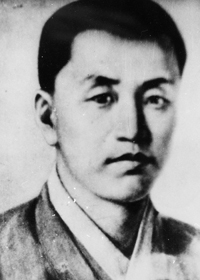
Yang Se-bong, 2nd commander-in-chief of the Korean Revolutionary Army

The independence army was organized, military committee chairman Lee Woong served concurrently as commander, and each company commander was appointed. The Korean Revolutionary Army, collected at the same time as the formation of the Korean Revolutionary Party, was an armed army independent from the National People's Prefecture and engaged in revolutionary work. Therefore, only these revolutionary troops were allowed to carry weapons, and each unit appointed a military committee member as a representative to form a military committee, which was the leading body of the revolutionary army. The Korean Revolutionary Army, which had 10,000 troops, reorganized the ten units into seven and stationed them in various locations. It appointed Lee Jin-seon as commander-in-chief, Yang Byeok-hae as vice-commander, and Lee Woong as chief of staff. He left an excellent record by launching an armed anti-Japanese movement around the time of the establishment of Manchukuo.

Since its establishment, they have fought against the Japanese military or police or joined forces with Chinese anti-Japanese troops. As an organization organized through difficulties, the determination of the National People's Prefecture was remarkable. Korea and China waged a joint anti-Japanese struggle through the Korean Revolutionary Army. They even attacked the Seonminbu (鮮民府) and destroyed the pro-Japanese faction. They raided the headquarters, killed pro-Japanese collaborators, and dismantled the headquarters organization. He did not hesitate to gain the cooperation of the Chinese Nationalist Party and confront Korean socialists.

=== Administrative Divisions ===
In the early days of its establishment, the National People's Government encompassed Heunggyeong, Hwanin, Yuha, Tonghwa, Jian, Gwanjeon, Bongye, Haeryong, and Fushun. Local executive committees were established in places such as Wukseong (無順) and Bongseong (鳳城), and representatives were elected. Under the regional executive committee, a chairman, hundreds of heads of households, and ten heads of households were appointed and entrusted with the census of families and the collection of various duties. The money collected in this way was used as maintenance expenses for the Korean Revolutionary Army in consultation with the Inspector General of Police and the Korean Revolutionary Army Company Commander.

The main projects were limited to civil activities, public information, education, and farmers' rights advocacy campaigns. As part of public affairs activities, the prefecture published the National People's Government newspaper and various publications as needed to promote national consciousness.

Among the National Affairs Department projects, the peasant movement not only protects farmers from unfair administrative measures and various restrictive measures by Chinese government officials and the tyranny and exploitation of Chinese landlords but also blocks Japan's plot to drive division between Chinese and Koreans, thereby establishing a relationship between Korea and China. It was about strengthening the bond.

== Economy ==
To enlighten farmers, the Ministry of Finance compiled the Farmers' Reading Book and operated monthly correspondence education and a traveling library. For publishing activities, the Korean Revolutionary Party founded the Korean Revolution as an organ magazine in April 1930. Namman Academy published Bonghwa (烽火). For the enlightenment of farmers, they compiled the Farmers' Reading Book and operated a monthly correspondence education and traveling bookstore. Kookmin Department set up a store in Hongmyoja, Sinbinhyeon, raised expenses, and used it as a communication base. In Tonghe County, efforts were made to establish an economic foundation by establishing the Northwest River Farm. The farm is in Jilin, Manchuria, and it also became a hideout and base for activists who fled after the invasion. The funds for its activities depended more on the duties collected from Koreans living in Manchuria. As the economy became more difficult due to the invasion, the number of people unable to pay their dues increased. There were cases where the department even took government-style actions against them, such as collecting dues by force.

== Education ==
Educational activities were the main focus of the Ministry of Education. Seodangs were established in villages, elementary schools in districts, and secondary schools in rural areas to train talented individuals. Representative educational institutions included Hwaheung Middle School and Dongmyeong Middle School. Believing that securing excellent teachers was essential in educational work, he established an affiliated teacher's school in Wangqingmun and trained teachers. The prefecture made special efforts to educate Korean children and established elementary schools and schools in the village. He established Hwaheung Middle School (化興中學校) in Wangcheongmun (汪淸門), Xinbin County (新賓縣), and also established a school called Namman Academy within the middle school to intensively nurture young talents. He also made efforts in education projects, building a Seodang in each village and establishing Hwaheung Middle School to foster talented young people.

== Reorganization ==
After the fall of the government, Chief of Staff Kim Hak-gyu (金學奎) was dispatched to the jurisdiction to request support from the Chinese Nationalist Government, but it was unsuccessful. In particular, it suffered a major blow when the Japanese assassinated Yang Se-bong, the commander-in-chief of the Korean Revolutionary Army, in September 1934. In this situation, to unite the National People's Government members, the Korean Revolutionary Party and the Korean Revolutionary Army came together. Ultimately, at the general meeting of county and civilian representatives held in November 1934, it was decided to integrate the Kukmin Prefecture and the Korean Revolutionary Army to form the Korean Revolutionary Army Government with the party as its governing administration.

== Significance and Evaluation ==
The Korean Revolutionary Army and the Korean Revolutionary Party, which supported the National People's Government activities, were weakened by internal strife between socialists and nationalists and naturally disbanded as their leading figures were killed one after another. However, due to the National People's Government's enlightenment movement, hundreds of independence fighters were produced and later led the independence movement. On the other hand, certain limitations and problems can be pointed out, such as internal conflict in the early stages of its establishment, suppression of socialist forces, and the burden it places on the people by taking the form of a government-style organization.

== See also ==
- Korean Revolutionary Party
  - Korean Revolutionary Army
- Communism in Korea
- Korean nationalism
- Korean Independence Movement
  - List of militant Korean independence activist organizations
- Korean People's Association in Manchuria
- Anarchism in Korea
