= Hyŏn Ikch'ŏl =

Korean independence activist (1890–1938)

- 현익철

Chairman of the Central Executive Committee of the National People's Government
- In office 1929–1931
- Preceded by: Office established
- Succeeded by: Kim Ho-seok

Central Executive Secretary of the Korean Revolutionary Party
- In office 1929–1931
- Preceded by: Office established

Personal details
- Born: 1890 Pakchon County, North Pyongan Province, Joseon
- Died: May 7, 1938 (age 48) Changsha, Hunan, Republic of China
- Resting place: Mt. Akrok, Changsha, Hunan, Republic of China
- Party: Korean Revolutionary Party
- Spouse: Pang Sunhŭi
- Children: Hyŏn Sukja

Korean name
- Hangul: 현익철
- Hanja: 玄益哲
- RR: Hyeon Ikcheol
- MR: Hyŏn Ikch'ŏl

Art name
- Hangul: 묵관
- Hanja: 默觀
- RR: Mukgwan
- MR: Mukkwan

Hyŏn Ikch'ŏl (Korean: 현익철; Hanja: 玄益哲; 1890 – May 7, 1938) was a teacher and a Korean independence activist who served as chairman of the Tongui Department during the Japanese Occupation of Korea, chairman of the central executive committee of the National People's Prefecture, and central executive secretary of the Korean Revolutionary Party, and member of the Military Studies Compilation Committee of the Provisional Government of the Republic of Korea.

== Early life and career ==
Hyŏn Ikch'ŏl was born in 1890 in Bakcheon, North Pyongan Province, Joseon. Right after the Japan–Korea Treaty of 1910, He crossed the Yalu River in 1911 and went into exile to the West Jiandao region and gathered his comrades. But things didn't work out for him, so he returned to his hometown.

There, he attempted to forge Bank of Japan banknotes and use them to fund the independence movement. However, he was discovered, arrested, and imprisoned at the Anju Police Station in South Pyeongan Province in 1912. The teacher spent half a year in prison. In 1918, he settled in Heunggyeong-hyeon (now Bongcheon-seong (now Liaoning Province). This was a mountainous area, but there were wide plains in between. Many Koreans came here and worked in agriculture. Around this time, the Korean population in Heunggyeong-hyeon showed remarkable development, reaching a significant 65,000 people. Accordingly, an independence movement organization based on Korean compatriots here was formed and began to show significant development. At this time, independence movement organizations formed in Heunggyeong-hyeon included the Korean Association and the Korean Independence Volunteer Corps. In this year, he taught children as a teacher at Heungdong School, an ethnic school in Heunggyeong-hyeon, and joined these organizations and worked as an executive.

== Joining the independence movement ==
Meanwhile, in 1919, as the March 1st Movement unfolded widely in Korea and the enthusiasm for the independence movement greatly increased, the teacher made a new decision and moved his activities to the North Gando region, where Korean compatriots were at the center. In particular, he continued the independence movement by participating in the Daehan Military Government (大韓軍政署), widely known as the Northern Military Administration Office in which General Kim Chwajin was active. The Daehangunjeongseo was an independence movement organization based on the Daejonggyo lineage and was devoted to the development and training of independence troops with the goal of a powerful war of independence. It was in close contact with the Provisional Government of the Republic of Korea in Shanghai and served it. During this process, he realized the necessity of participating in the armed war for independence and decided to receive systematic military education and training.

At a fairly young age, Hyŏn entered the Haniha, West Jiandao, branch of the Shinheung Military Academy.

Afterwards, he participated in the Korean Association, an autonomous organization for Koreans in the Manchurian region, and also joined the West Road Military Government, a central leadership organization for the independence movement in the West Jiandao region, and became involved in the independence movement. However, the Western Military Government was unable to launch a full-scale war of independence due to its own limitations and pressure from the Chinese warlord regime and the Japanese consulate. Accordingly, the teacher gathered a new group of relatively young and energetic people and organized the Gwanghandan, an anti-Japanese armed struggle organization, in Hyangno-gu, Guanzhen County, Fengtian Province, China, in February 1920. About 40 people participated in this organization, including Hyŏn Chonggyŏng (real name 玄炳根), a relative from the same family, Yi Howŏn (李浩源), Kim Sŏksŏn (金錫善), and Hong Wŏngyŏng (洪元京).

In particular, in April 1921, the teacher dispatched nine members, including Kim Jun-gyeong, to the country based in Myoja-gu, Gwanjeon-hyeon, and carried out an operation to raise military funds in the Jeongju area of North Pyongan Province . However, they were soon arrested by Japanese police. Therefore, the teacher was wanted by the Japanese and escaped several times, but was eventually arrested by the Japanese police and sentenced to three years in prison. However, after being released from prison in 1924, he crossed the Yalu River again and joined Tonguibu (統義府), an integrated organization of the independence movement in southern Manchuria. At this time, he took on the important role of Chairman of the Foreign Affairs Committee and was mainly responsible for negotiations with Chinese officials, while also working closely with the Provisional Government in Shanghai.

== Independence activist ==
As the March First Movement took place in Korea in 1919, the enthusiasm for the independence movement increased. The teacher moved his activities to the North Jiandao region, where Korean compatriots were at the center, and participated in the Korean Military Campaign in which General Kim Jwa-jin was active. The Korean military policy aimed to wage a strong war of independence and focused on the training and training of independent troops. Hyŏn felt the need to participate in the armed independence war. He decided to receive a systematic military education and military training. Accordingly, at the age of 30, he entered the Shinheung Military Academy branch established in Hani River, Tonghua County, West Jiandao, and studied military studies. At that time, there were many young people who came to Shinheung Military Academy after the March 1st Movement. The teacher completed a six-month course at the Haniha Shinheung Military Academy branch.

Afterwards, the teacher participated in the Han People Association, an autonomous organization of Koreans in southern Manchuria, and also joined and worked in the Northern Military Administration Office an independence movement organization in the West Jiandao region. Hyŏn Ikch'ŏl gathered 40 young people and founded Gwanghandan, an anti-Japanese armed struggle organization, in Hyangno-gu, Guanzhen County, Bongcheon Province, China, in February 1920. Together with his Gwanghandan comrades, he attacked and executed Japanese colonial exploitation agencies and pro-Japanese activists. He also worked hard to raise funds for the independence movement.

In April 1921, he was based in Myoja-gu, Gwanjeon-hyeon, and dispatched nine members, including Kim Jun-kyung, to the country to conduct an operation to raise military funds in the Jeongju area of North Pyongan Province. However, they were caught by the Japanese police. In the end, the teacher was caught by the Japanese police and sentenced to three years in prison. However, after being released from prison in 1924, he crossed the Yalu River again and became active in Tonguibu, an integrated organization of the independence movement in southern Manchuria.

=== Bureau of Justice and Military Prefecture ===
In 1924, he served as Chairman of the Foreign Affairs Committee in the Daehan Tonguibu, and was in charge of negotiations with Chinese officials and had close contact with the Provisional Government.

In January 1925, when the independence movement groups in southern Manchuria were integrated with the Tongui-bu expanding into the Bureau of Justice and Military Prefecture by Kim I-dae, Chi Ch'ŏngch'ŏn, Oh Dong-jin, and Kim Dong-sam, and he joined the group. By participating in this, he worked hard to fight against Japan and stabilize the lives of his Korean compatriots. He was especially active as a member of the central executive committee and head of the finance department of the Bureau of Justice and Military Prefecture. He promoted the financial management of Bureau of Justice and Military Prefecture and the stabilization of the lives of Korean compatriots.

The Hyŏn focused his attention on the education of children and youth in areas under the jurisdiction of the Bureau of Justice and Military Prefecture. The Hyŏn created textbooks for children's education at the level of the Ministry of Justice and supported the education of the second generation of compatriots in deep mountainous areas. Textbooks for first and second grade elementary school students were copied using a brush, and textbooks for upper grades were made using a mimeograph. This was distributed to the children of compatriots in the Baekdu Mountain area.

In Chacheon-ri, he also devoting himself to the independence movement by uniting small independence movement groups in deep mountainous remote areas such as Fusong, Jangbaek, and Ando-hyeon at the foot of Mt. Baekdu to form 'Heungeopdan.' A representative was dispatched to Cha Do-seon (real name: Cha Do-seon - former righteous army general) to persuade him to join the Bureau of Justice and Military Prefecture. As a result, Korean compatriots from the Baekdu Mountain area, hundreds of kilometers away from Jilin, the center of Bureau of Justice and Military Prefecture, were recruited as members of Bureau of Justice and Military Prefecture. As a result, he succeeded in subsuming the Heungeopdan faction, which was based in the areas of Fusong, Ando, and Jangbaek County, into the Bureau of Justice and Military Prefecture organizational system.

He also worked hard to purge pro-Japanese factions. There was an Oriental medicine doctor named Shin Han-cheol in Kwaedaemuja, Tonghwa-hyeon, not far from the headquarters of Bureau of Justice and Military Prefecture. He said that independence activists participating in the Ministry of Justice and other organizations created a pro-Japanese organization called 'Sangjogye', saying, "Independence is something that cannot succeed, and only takes away the people's money." Through this, he encouraged his compatriots to not fulfill their duties to the government and hindered the independence movement. When the independence army passed by, he reported it to the Chinese police and had them hand over the currency to the Japanese consulate police.

Leaders of the Bureau of Justice and Military Prefecture and independence fighters, including Hyŏn Ikch'ŏl, warned him several times. Nevertheless, Shin Han-cheol still interfered with the independence movement and acted pro-Japanese. Accordingly, in September 1926, the teacher sent five members of the Bureau of Justice and Military Prefecture Volunteer Army, including Second Lieutenant Kim Chang-rim (real name 金元國), to execute pro-Japanese activist Shin Han-cheol and his family.

=== National People's Prefecture ===
In 1926, he formed the Korean Revolutionary Party in Jilin with Yang Gi-tak, Lee Dong-gu, and Cho So-su and was appointed chairman.

In 1927, he organized National People's Prefecture (國民府) by integrating several organizations, and was appointed chairman of the central executive committee. The mainstream faction of the Bureau of Justice and Military Prefecture Volunteer Army, the Civil Affairs Committee of the Korean People's Association in Manchuria, and Shim Yong-jun's affiliates of the Army Advisory Office formed the 'National Unity Party Organizational Alliance' in September 1928 and attempted to form a unified autonomous government and a single national party. At this time, he became the representative of the National Unity Party Organizational Alliance along with Kim I-dae (金履大).

In March 1929, as a representative of the Bureau of Justice and Military Prefecture, he joined Lee Dong-rim, Go I-heo, Go Hwal-sin, Choi Dong-wook, Lee Tak, etc. as a member of the integrated independence movement organization in southern Manchuria. He participated in the organization of the National People's Prefecture (國民府). On May 28 of this year, when the Central Executive Committee of the National People's Prefecture was formed, he took over as Chairman of the Central Executive Committee and worked hard to stabilize the lives of Koreans, provide national education, leading the independence movement, and purge pro-Japanese factions and Japanese ruling institutions.

In May 1929, he served as Chairman of the Central Executive Committee of the National People's Prefecture, and was appointed as the representative of the National Unique Party Organizational Alliance, and at the end of the same year, he also served as Central Executive Secretary of the Korean Revolutionary Party. However, in 1930, due to the incident of party officials being killed or arrested by the Japanese military, he improved the party organization, became the central secretary, took charge of party affairs, and continued the anti-Japanese struggle.

In July 1931, Hyŏn, who concurrently served as Chairman of the Central Executive Committee of the Korean Revolutionary Party and Commander-in-Chief of the Korean Revolutionary Army, went to Shenyang, the capital of Liaoning Province, and proposed a joint struggle between Korea and China to the powerful figures in the local government. He conveyed to him the 'General Statement on the Situation of Hangyo in Dongseong Province' and the 'Memorandum of Opinion on Collaboration of the Korean-Chinese Peoples'.

== Joining the Provisional Government of the Republic of Korea ==
In 1931, while going to Bongcheon for diplomatic negotiations, he was caught by the Japanese police and sentenced to seven years in prison by the Sinuiju District Court after a Korean spy tipped them off. When he was released on sick bail while serving a sentence in Sinuiju Prison, he succeeded in escaping to Manchuria again to avoid surveillance by the Japanese police.

He went to Nanjing (南京), where many of the Provisional Government's key figures were staying. Then he arrived in Changsha, Hunan Province with his wife, Bang Sun-hee, and his young son, Jong-hwa, as part of the extended family of the Provisional Government. At that time, the provisional government moved to Hangzhou, Zhejiang Province, China, and conditions were very difficult. The reason the Provisional Government and other important officials went to Changsha was because food was very cheap here and they could communicate and communicate with overseas countries through nearby Hong Kong. He then rebuilt and rejoined the Korean Revolutionary Party. In 1937, when Japan provoked the 2nd Sino-Japanese War and launched a full-scale war of continental invasion, three organizations, including the Korean Independence Party, the Korean National Revolutionary Party, and the Korean Revolutionary Party, and six Korean organizations organized in Hawaii, Mexico, and other places formed the Korean Liberation Advancement Line. A group was formed and the anti-Japanese front was reorganized. Here, he served as an operational executive and worked with his comrades to publish and distribute magazines, leaflets, slogans, etc. He also served as a member of the Military Committee of the Provisional Government.

When the Provisional Government of the Republic of Korea moved to Chongqing, the Korean Liberation Movement also moved to Chongqing and continued its anti-Japanese struggle by supporting the Provisional Government. In the same year, he was appointed as a member of the Military Studies Compilation Committee under the Ministry of Military Affairs of the Provisional Government and worked with Cho Seong-hwan, Yoo Dong-yeol, Chi Ch'ŏngch'ŏn, and Kim Hak-gyu. As the international situation improved favorably after the Sino-Japanese War, in the spring of 1938, he appealed to those around him for the unification of the Korean Revolutionary Party, the Korean National Revolutionary Party, and the Korean Independence Party, which had similar ideologies. Accordingly, on May 7, 1938, Kim Ku, Chi Ch'ŏngch'ŏn, Yoo Dong-yeol, and others gathered at Nanmuting at a banquet, where the Korean Revolutionary Party office was located, to discuss the issue of unification of the three parties.

== Assassination ==
Lee Un-hwan, a member of the Korean Revolutionary Party who had been funded by Kim Ku because he wanted to go on a special operation from Nanjing to Shanghai, suddenly rushed in and fired a pistol. Kim Ku was hit by the first bullet, and Hyŏn by the second bullet, Yoo by the third, and Ji by the fourth. Ryu suffered serious injuries and Ji minor. Hyŏn was seriously injured by a bullet and was taken to the hospital, but died on arrival.

=== Motives ===
The reason why Lee Un-hwan fired shots at the members of the Provisional Government was because they insisted on their own opinions and made little progress in unifying the movement front, and the dissatisfaction that had been building up exploded because Kim Gu and other leaders of the Provisional Government gave low living expenses to the youth of the Korean Revolutionary Party. One theory is that Lee Un-hwan caused the incident at the instigation of Park Chang-se, who defected to the pro-Japanese faction. For this incident, Lee Un-Hwan was arrested and imprisoned in a Chinese prison, but escaped from prison during the Sino-Japanese War and went missing.

Hyŏn Ikch'ŏl was seriously injured and was taken to the hospital, but he died shortly after arriving. The teacher, who had campaigned for independence with unwavering will for over 20 years, died on May 7, 1938, without ever seeing his country liberated. The Provisional Government buried him on Mount Akrok in Changsha with a state funeral.

This incident is often called the Changsha Incident (長沙事變) or Nammokcheong Incident in the history of the independence movement. The Provisional Government held a funeral with a state funeral in praise of his decades-long dedication to the liberation of his country.

== Legacy ==
Hyŏn Ikch'ŏl, who had been in and out of prison several times and devoted himself to the independence movement with indomitable fighting spirit for over 20 years, died on May 7, 1938, without ever seeing his country liberated in vain.

"He was a bright person and knew a lot. In the past, as the head of the Bureau of Justice and Military Prefecture in Manchuria, he fought fiercely for the independence movement even though he was surrounded on three sides by Japanese pirates, the Communist Party, and pro-Japanese elements under Jang Jak-rim (張作霖)."

— Kim Ku, Diary of Kim Ku.

In honor of the deceased's merits, the government awarded him a posthumous certificate of independence in 1962, and the Ministry of Patriots and Veterans Affairs selected him as the independence activist of September 2006.

== See also ==
- Korean Independence Movement
- List of militant Korean independence activist organizations
- List of Korean independence activists
- Righteous Government
- National People's Government
