= Korean People's Association in Manchuria =

1929–1931 self-governing anarchist area

Korean People’s Association in Manchuria 재만한족총연합회
- 1929–1931
- Flag

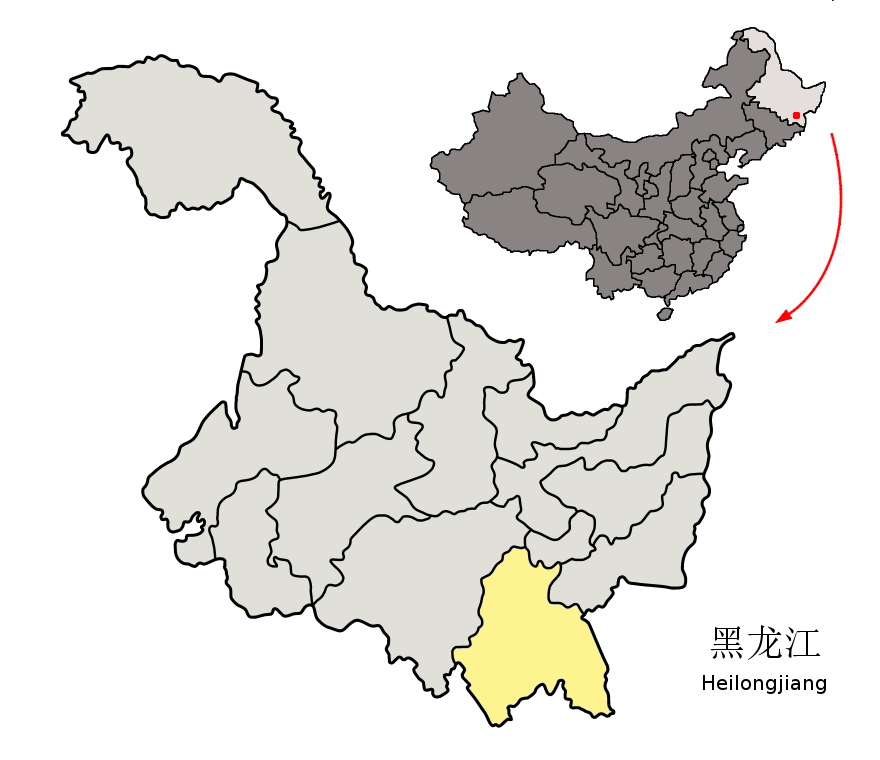
- Map of Mudanjiang Prefecture
- Status: Historically unrecognized autonomous prefecture
- Capital: Hailin (de facto)
- Common languages: Korean
- Demonym: Korean
- Government: Autonomous self-governing cooperative organization
- Chairman
  - 1929-1930: Kim Chwa-chin
- Historical era: Interwar period
  - Established: August 1929
  - Disestablished: September 1931

Population
  - 1930: 2,000,000
Preceded by	Succeeded by
Republic of China	State of Manchuria; National People's Government
- Today part of: China

- Korean People’s Association in Manchuria
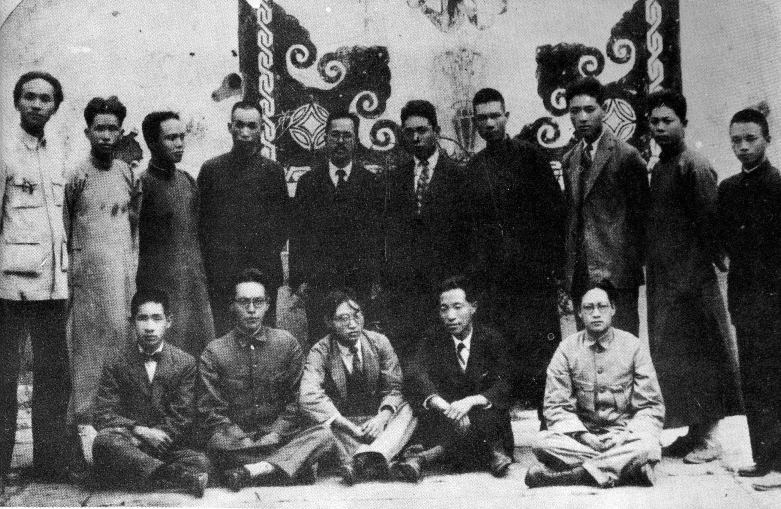
- Founding members of the KPAM in 1928

Korean name
- Hangul: 재만한족총연합회
- Hanja: 在滿韓族總聯合會
- Revised Romanization: Jaeman Hanjok Chongyeonhaphoe
- McCune–Reischauer: Chaeman Hanjok Ch'ongyŏnhaphoe

Korean Anarchist Federation in Manchuria
- Hangul: 재만조선무정부주의자연맹
- Hanja: 在滿朝鮮無政府主義者聯盟
- Revised Romanization: Jaeman Joseon Mujeongbujuuija Yeonmaeng
- McCune–Reischauer: Chaeman Chosŏn Mujŏngbujuŭija Yŏnmaeng

Shinmin Prefecture
- Hangul: 신민부
- Hanja: 新民府
- Revised Romanization: Sinminbu
- McCune–Reischauer: Sinminbu

The Korean People's Association in Manchuria (KPAM; Korean: 재만한족총연합회; August 1929 – September 1931) was a self-governing autonomous prefecture in Manchuria, populated by two million Korean refugees. Following the Japanese occupation of Korea, many Korean anarchists had fled over the border into Manchuria, where they began organising a network of mutual aid for displaced Koreans in the region. Together with some Korean nationalists, they established the KPAM in order to provide food, education and self-defence to its members. Before long, the association found itself under attack by both Korean communists and Japanese imperialists, who assassinated their leadership. The Japanese invasion of Manchuria put an end to the anarchist experiment, with many of its members fleeing to China in order to fight against the Japanese Empire.

== Background ==
Following the outbreak of the Donghak Peasant Revolution of 1894, the Empire of Japan intervened in Korea, which brought the peninsula under Japanese influence. Meanwhile, the Japanese invasion of Manchuria had caused heightened tensions with the Russian Empire, which was itself also occupying Manchuria. Following the subsequent Russo-Japanese War, the Empire of Japan secured vast concessions in Manchuria, taking control of the railways, establishing a number of imperial enclaves and eventually consolidating its military forces into the Kwantung Army. Korea was itself formally annexed by the Empire of Japan in the Japan–Korea Treaty of 1910, forcing many Korean dissidents to flee into exile in Manchuria, where they established study groups and military schools in order to prepare the Korean independence movement for action. Following the repression of the March 1st Movement, even more Koreans fled to Manchuria, leading to the development of the Korean anarchist movement in exile.

Meanwhile, the collapse of the Empire of China had given way to the Warlord Era, during which Manchuria came under the control of Zhang Zuolin. When he first rose to power, the Empire of Japan attempted to assassinate Zhang, but by 1924 they began bankrolling his activities due to his anti-communism, with Zhang going on to collaborate in repressing the Korean resistance in Manchuria. In June 1927, Zhang's Fengtian clique seized control of the Beiyang government and proclaimed the establishment of a military dictatorship. As Zhang was pulled into engagements with the National Revolutionary Army, the Japanese government started looking to destabilize his hold on power and take control of Manchuria. By June 1928, the Northern Expedition had forced Zhang to flee Beijing and retreat back to Manchuria by train. A few miles outside the Manchurian capital of Mukden, his train was blown up by Japanese imperial agents, killing him and sixteen other passengers. He was succeeded as warlord of Manchuria by his son, Zhang Xueliang, who took a decisively anti-Japanese stance and aligned himself with the Nationalist government.

== History ==
The anti-Japanese sentiment of the new administration in Manchuria opened up space for the Korean anarchist movement to restart its activities, now safe from political repression. This process culminated, on July 21, 1929, with the establishment of the Korean Anarchist Federation in Manchuria (KAFM) (Note: The Korean Anarchist Federation in Manchuria (KAFM), also known as the League of Korean Anarchists in Manchuria (LKAM), is translated from the Korean: 재만조선무정부주의자연맹, romanized: Jaeman Joseon Mujeongbujuuija Yeonmaeng (JJMY).) in Hailin. The KAFM was primarily focused on providing mutual aid for all Koreans in Manchuria, with the eventual goal being to establish a stateless society based on liberty and social equality, in which resources were to be distributed "from each according to their ability, to each according to their needs".

By this time, three self-governing Korean authorities had been established in Manchuria: the General Staff Headquarters on the Manchurian side of the Yalu River; the Righteous Government in the provinces of Jilin and Liaoning; and the New People's Government (Note: The New People's Government, also known as Shinmin Prefecture, is translated from the Korean: 신민부, romanized: Sinminbu.) in northern Manchuria, led by Kim Chwa-chin. Although initially driven by Korean nationalism, the New People's Government increasingly began to take up anarchist principles, in order to counter the rising influence of Marxism–Leninism in the region. This culminated in August 1929, when the New People's Government and the KAFM were integrated into the Korean People's Association in Manchuria (KPAM), (Note: The Korean People's Association (KPA), also known as the United Society of All Korean People (USAKP) or the General League of Koreans (GLK), is translated from the Korean: 재만한족총연합회, romanized: Hanjok Chongyeon Haphoe (HCH).) with Kim Chwa-chin being elected as its chairperson.

The KPAM's plan was to develop systems of cooperative agriculture, free education and arms training in Manchuria. Its primary goal was to meet the immediate material needs of Korean migrant workers and to protect them from exploitation, both by Chinese landlords and Korean nationalist authorities. In order to help them settle and cultivate land, it introduced collective farming, which collectivized the production and sale of agricultural produce. Although Korean nationalists cooperated in the KPAM, nationalist goals of independence were subordinated to the immediate survival of Korean migrant workers, grounded in the Korean anarchists' principles of mutual aid. Activities that would have agitated for an independent and/or anarchist Korea were postponed, in favor of sustaining their economic programs.

The Korean autonomous zone in Manchuria was eventually encircled by Imperial Japanese forces in the south and Soviet forces in the north, with covert operatives being sent into the territory to target prominent Korean anarchists. The KPAM began to suffer a number of difficulties with the loss of many of its leading figures: on January 20, 1930, Kim Chwa-chin was assassinated by Korean communists while repairing a rice mill; in September 1930, Yi Eulgyu was arrested by Japanese imperial police and extradited back to Korea; and in July 1931, Kim Jongjin was assassinated. Finally, on September 18, 1931, the Japanese invasion put a definitive end to the Korean anarchist experiment in Manchuria, with the puppet state of Manchukuo being established in its place. The remnants of the Korean anarchist organizations retreated to southern China, where many of them volunteered to fight in the Second Sino-Japanese War.

== Governance ==
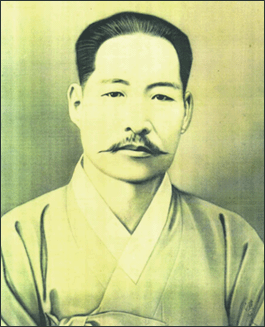
Kim Chwa-chin, chairman of the Korean People's Association in Manchuria and commander of the Korean Independence Army (1929)

The KPAM defined itself as an "autonomous, self-governing, cooperative organization." Its representative system and administrative body were designed, according to anarchist principle of self-governance, to be a "government without [compulsory] government". Decisions were largely made in village assemblies, with a decentralized federation of councils at the village, district and regional levels dealing with larger matters.

The KPAM drew heavily from the economic theories of libertarian socialism and established mutual banks, worker cooperatives and a comprehensive schooling system throughout their territories. Regional councils were also created. In the meanwhile, they appointed higher-level staff (who only received average wage) from the top down, with lower levels of officials regionally chosen. Organization and propaganda teams worked with agitating the populace, both to get the farmer's support and to get them to create independent village assemblies and committees. Seemingly, these teams were welcome to almost everywhere they went, with no major incidents being noted.

The Korean Independence Army, commanded by General Kim Chwa-chin, formed the military of Shinmin Prefecture. Effectively a peasant militia, the army's experienced soldiers were supplemented by guerrillas, trained in the prefecture's military academy, with which the army waged guerrilla warfare against both the Empire of Japan and Soviet Union. It also established a Safety Unit (Korean: 치안대, romanized: Chiandae) and an Anti-Japanese Guerrilla Unit, in order to protect Koreans from local bandits and Imperial Japanese forces respectively.

== See also ==
- Makhnovshchina
- National People's Government
- People's Republic of Korea
- Revolutionary Catalonia
- Yanbian Korean Autonomous Prefecture

== Bibliography ==
- Behr, Edward (1987). The Last Emperor. New York: Bantam Books. ISBN 0-553-34474-9. OCLC 489010018.
- Gelderloos, Peter (2010). "How will decisions be made?". Anarchy Works. San Francisco: Ardent Press. pp. 48–66. OCLC 748435918.
- Hirsch, Steven; van der Walt, Lucien (2010). "Rethinking Anarchism and Syndicalism: the Colonial and Postcolonial Experience, 1870–1940". Anarchism and Syndicalism in the Colonial and Postcolonial World, 1870–1940. Studies in Global Social History. Vol. 6. Leiden: Brill. pp. xxxi–lxxiii. ISBN 978-90-04-18849-5. ISSN 1874-6705. OCLC 1200925424.
- Ha, Ki-Rak (1986). History of the Korean anarchist movement. Taegu: Anarchist Publishing Committee. OCLC 937149346.
- Hwang, Dongyoun (2016). "Experimenting Place-Based Anarchism in Manchuria". Anarchism in Korea: Independence, Transnationalism, and the Question of National Development, 1919-1984 (PDF). Albany, New York: SUNY Press. pp. 48–55. ISBN 978-1-4384-6167-0. OCLC 1039293708.
- MacSimoin, Alan (2002) [1991]. The Korean Anarchist Movement. Braamfontein: Zabalaza. OCLC 999512376.
- Schmidt, Michael (2013). Cartography of Revolutionary Anarchism. Edinburgh: AK Press. ISBN 9781849351386. OCLC 881111188.
