= Korean Revolutionary Party =

1929–1935 pro-independence group

Korean Revolutionary Party 조선혁명당 朝鮮革命黨
- Leader: Hyeon Ik-cheol
- Founded: 1929
- Dissolved: 1935
- Succeeded by: Korean National Revolutionary Party
- Armed wing: Korean Revolutionary Army
- Ideology: Korean nationalism; Anti-communism
- Political position: Right-wing
- Slogan: Eradicating Japanese imperialism and achieving Korea’s absolute independence.

Party flag

- Korean Revolutionary Party
- Hangul: 조선혁명당
- Hanja: 朝鮮革命黨
- Revised Romanization: Joseon Hyeongmyeongdang
- McCune–Reischauer: Chosŏn Hyŏngmyŏngdang

The Korean Revolutionary Party (KRP; Korean: 조선혁명당) was a right-wing nationalist political party that was active in Korea during the 1920s and 1930s. It was founded in 1925 by a group of Korean exiles in China, and it aimed to overthrow Japanese colonial rule in Korea and establish an independent state. In 1929, the Korean Revolutionary Party carried out an armed uprising against the Japanese colonial government in Korea. The uprising, which took place in the South Hamgyong Province, was quickly suppressed by Japanese forces, and many of the party's leaders were arrested or killed.

== Background ==
In 1927, under the influence of the National One Party Movement, the independence movement forces active in Manchuria also began to discuss integration. The integration of the three departments, which were the autonomous institutions of the Korean community in Manchuria and the independence movement groups, was promoted. Still, the meeting was canceled due to internal conflicts among the departments and differences in their views on integration. In response, the Shinminbu military government faction, the Chamuibu mainstream faction, and the Jeonguibu secession faction disbanded the existing organizations and organized an innovation assembly in December 1928. In response, the majority faction of Jeonguibu, the Minjung faction of Shinminbu, and the remaining faction of Chamuibu formed Kukminbu in April 1929.

Between 1928 and 1929, as the movement to unite the independence movement groups in Manchuria into single ranks developed, the effort to integrate was confronted by the 'Council faction and the 'Chuseonghoe' faction, and both camps were opposed by the 'Council faction's People's Council, and it was established as an innovation council of the 'Chosunhoe' faction. Since then, the Peoples Council has been carrying out self-governing activities and anti-Japanese independence movements in Korean society while maintaining the National Unique Party Organizational Alliance to organize the National Unique Party, and in 1929, formed the Joseon Revolutionary Party. An independence movement organization that developed an anti-Japanese independence movement in Manchuria in 1929 by leading the People's Council, an autonomous organization, and the Joseon Revolutionary Army, an armed group.

== Formation of the Korean Revolutionary Party ==
On September 20, 1929, the 1st Central Council of the Ministry of National Affairs was held, and the organization of the Joseon Revolutionary Party was decided. The Joseon Revolutionary Party was formed in Jilin Province in September 1929 as a sister organization with a political party character to the People's Council (國民府) under the mantra of “eradicating Japanese imperialism and achieving Korea's absolute independence.” Therefore, the Korean Revolutionary Party was in charge of matters related to the independence movement of the People's Council and decided to organize the armed organization under the Korean Revolutionary Army.506) This was in response to the trend of the times called 以黨工作·以黨統治. The Peoples Council divided the roles as an autonomous administrative agency of the Korean community and the Korean Revolutionary Army as an organization in charge of military missions for the independence movement, and its organization and operation were unique. It was equipped with a system to be placed under the political leadership of the political party, the Korean Revolutionary Party.

== Ideology ==
Most were nationalists, and this party was a coalition of nationalist forces. Nevertheless, the declaration announced at its establishment strongly advocated socialist logic. In other words, they “eradicate Japanese imperialism, destroy all forces of internal oppression and exploitation, complete the absolute independence of Korea, establish a labor and democratic regime, and at the same time confiscate and state-owned large corporations and institutions, and confiscate large land holdings. Hyeon declared his purpose, saying, “It is distributed to farmers and promotes the balanced development of their lives through all efforts.” Although they are 'an association of nationalists,' the main reason for the socialist logic in the declaration is that the revolutionary socialist ideology was widely accepted within the national movement following the success of the Russian Revolution at the time. The majority of the Korean community in Manchuria were peasants; it can be seen that accepting this logic was more advantageous in terms of propaganda. However, the conflict between the nationalist and socialist factions was extreme. As a result, Hyeon Ik-cheol of the nationalist force drove out the socialist faction of Yeon Ha-seok and took over real power.

== Activities ==
The Korean Revolutionary Party engaged in party activities in Manchuria in the early 1930s along with the Korean Independence Party (Manchuria). Unlike other political parties, which all have independent military powers belonging to the party and focus their activities on policy proposal and organization, they are characterized in that they emphasize the maintenance of the party organization for political guidance of anti-Japanese combat activities.

Since the Alliance of National Unique Party Organizations had already been active as a party, activities of the party appeared even before the Joseon Revolutionary Party was organized. In December of that year, the Joseon Revolutionary Party was entrusted with all affairs related to the independence movement from the National Unity Party Organization Alliance and organized the Joseon Revolutionary Army, an armed organization of the Peoples Council, under the leadership of the Joseon Revolutionary Party. The Joseon Revolutionary Party, as the nation's only party in South Manchuria, realized a system complete with the trinity of the party, government, and military under the leadership of the Korean Revolutionary Party, in which the Ministry of National Affairs was in charge of civil administration and the Korean Revolutionary Army was in charge of military activities.

The Korean Revolutionary Party took charge of revolutionary work as the only party in the nation according to the principle of two parties ruling the country. The Korean Revolutionary Party led the self-governing Kookmin-bu (國民府), which managed the Korean community in South Manchuria, and the Korean Revolutionary Army, a military organization. Hyeon Ik-cheol was elected as the chairman of the Chosun Revolutionary Party. The Chosun Revolutionary Party published magazines and publications to convey theories and political ideas of the independence movement to Koreans in South Manchuria. It promoted educational activities for Korean youth in Manchuria.

== Organization ==
At the time of its inception, Hyeon Ik-cheol (Central Executive Secretary), Hyeon Jeong-gyeong (玄正卿, politics), Lee Woong (李雄, military), Ko Yi-heo (高而虛, organization), Choi Dong-oh (崔東旿, diplomacy), Jang Seung-eon (張承彦, treasurer), Kim Bo-an (金輔安, education), and Gohal-sin [高轄信, also known as: Gohwal-sin (高豁信), Shenzhen] were active as executives. There were 3,500 and 2,000 quasi-party members in 100 branches and departments, including the provincial and county party departments.

The central figures of the Korean Revolutionary Party were Choi Dong-suk, Li Dong-seon, Goh-sin Shin, and Lee Jeong. Looking at the content of the constituent executives, Oksana was the central secretary, and the seven chairpersons were Ok Jeong-won (Political Department), Gao Hee-soo (Organization Department), Kim Shin-an (Education Department), Jang Sang-gu (Sports Ministry), Choi Dong-oh (Foreign Ministry), and Goh. Hwalshin (propaganda department) and Lee Woong (military department) were appointed respectively.

The initial formation of the Chosun Revolutionary Party is generally as follows:

=== Central Committee ===
- Lee Tak
- Choi Dong-oh
- Hyeon Ik-cheol
- Yoo Dong-yeol
- Lee Il-se
- Ko Hal-sin
- Kim I-dae
- Lee Woong
- Lee Dong-san
- Hyeon Jeong-gyeong (Hyang)
- Lee Dong-lim
- Kim Don
- Kim Tak
- Ko Yi-heo
- Lee Jin-tak

=== Divisions ===
The Korean Revolutionary Party had seven divisions and three committees, and the Korean Revolutionary Army was placed under the Military Committee.

- Central Party Department of the Korean Revolutionary Party
- Central Executive Committee Chairman Hyeon Jung-gyeong (Hyang)
- Hyun Jeong-kyung (collectively), Vice Chairman of the Secretary
- Go Halsin, head of the organization department
- Director of Education Kim Bo-won
- Minister of Economy Jang Seung-eon
- Director of International Affairs Choi Dong-oh
- Minister of People's Republic of Korea Yihe
- Lee Woong, Chairman of the Military Commission
- Hyeon Ik-Chul, Chairman of the Autonomous Committee
- Jang Chul, Chairman of the Propaganda Committee

== Relations ==
=== National People's Prefecture ===
Hyeon Ik-cheol, head of the Central Executive Committee of the National People's Prefecture, served as the chairman of the Autonomous Committee of the Korean Revolutionary Party. Although the National Council and the Korean Revolutionary Party were separated in structure, many things were in common. In the end, the relationship between the Korean Revolutionary Party and the People's Council was between the one-party party and the administration based on the principle of two-party rule. The Korean Revolutionary Party was the only party in southern Manchuria. People's Council was an autonomous administrative agency of the Korean community, and its organization and operation were placed under the leadership of the Korean Revolutionary Party.

=== Korean Revolutionary Army ===
Flag of the Korean Revolutionary Army

The Korean Revolutionary Army (朝鮮革命軍) was initially an independent army under the People's Council. Later, the Korean Revolutionary Party placed the army under the Military Committee, organized to support and nurture the People's Council, and operated under the political guidance of the only party. It acted as a party army in charge of military duties for the independence movement. The Korean Revolutionary Army greatly reorganized the organization on December 20, 1929, to concretely realize the party's ideology. Through this reorganization, the Joseon Revolutionary Army appointed Lee Jin-task as the commander-in-chief, Yang Se-bong as the deputy commander, and Lee Ung as the chief of staff and organized the existing ten units into seven units.

== Decline ==
However, in August 1931, the Japanese arrested Hyeon Ik-chul, the chairman of the Revolutionary Party of Korea. The Joseon Revolutionary Party held a central committee meeting in Sinbin-Hyeon in January 1932 and discussed countermeasures against the Japanese invasion of Manchuria. At this meeting, the elder faction led by Choi Dong-oh (崔東旿) insisted on moving to China because working in Manchuria was no longer difficult. On the other hand, the young faction, such as Yi Ho-won and Kim Bo-an, adhered to the position that armed struggle should continue in Manchuria. However, around January 20, 1932, while the meeting was in progress, the Japanese imperialists raided the meeting place and arrested nine people, including Lee Ho-won and Kim Bo-won. The suppression continued until February; about 60 people were arrested, and 80 were martyred. The Joseon Revolutionary Party completely reshuffled its leadership and elected Go Yi-he (高而虛) as the party's central executive chairman, Kim Dong-san as the national executive chairman, and Yang Se-bong (梁世奉) as the commander-in-chief of the Joseon Revolutionary Army.

In September 1931, the full-scale Japanese invasion of Manchuria and the establishment of 'Manchukuo' followed, and the activities of the Revolutionary Party of Korea gradually declined. After the Manchurian Incident in September 1931, he left Manchuria. He went south to Korea, and in November 1932, he participated in the formation of the Alliance for the Unification of the Frontline against Japan. After establishing Manchukuo, the Japanese imperialists extensively suppressed the independence movement forces and strengthened the crackdown on the Korean community in Manchuria. In response, at the military and people's representative meeting held in November 1934, the government of the Joseon Revolutionary Army was formed by integrating the Ministry of National Affairs and the Joseon Revolutionary Army. The Joseon Revolutionary Army government saw that an international crisis would arise around 1935-1936 and planned to use this time as an opportunity to attempt a groundbreaking reconstruction. To this end, in July 1935, Yoo Kwang-ho was dispatched to Seoul to form an in-ship work committee, and 27 members were sent to Korea.

Separately, to connect with the activities of the Joseon Revolutionary Party in China, Choi Dong-oh and Kim Hak-kyu moved to China. They aimed to concentrate the movement forces within the jurisdiction to support the practical struggle in Manchuria. He also participated in the formation of the National Revolutionary Party, which included national movement parties in the jurisdiction. In the National Revolutionary Party, formed in July 1935, Choi Dong-oh, Kim Hak-kyu, and Kim Hwal-seok of the Joseon Revolutionary Party were elected to the Central Executive Committee. The Joseon Revolutionary Party joined the National Revolutionary Party and announced the declaration of dissolution, officially disbanding. In October 1936, Yun Young-bae was dispatched to Korea to attempt to form a famous workers' and peasants' organization.

== See also ==
- Korean Independence Movement
  - List of militant Korean independence activist organizations
    - Korean Revolutionary Army
- Korean Independence Party
  - Korean Independence Army (1929)
- National People's Prefecture
