= Korean Revolutionary Army =

1929–1937 arm of the Korean Revolutionary Party

- 조선혁명군 朝鮮革命軍
- Leaders: Lee Jin-tak (1929–1931); Yang Se-bong (1931–1934); Kim Hwal-seok (1934–1937)
- Dates active: May 1929 – April 1937
- Allegiance: National People's Government
- Headquarters: Umahaengho-dong Street in Jilin, Manchuria
- Size: 10,000
- Part of: Korean Revolutionary Party

The Korean Revolutionary Army (Korean: 조선혁명군; Hanja: 朝鮮革命軍) was formed in May 1929, while leaders of the anti-Japanese struggle gathered at the National People's Office on Umahaengho-dong Street in Jilin-si, Manchuria, and formed the National People's Government, the only revolutionary military government in southern Manchuria. It was organized into the prefecture's regular army. Afterwards, it was transferred to the Korean Revolutionary Party, which was organized to support and foster the National People's Prefecture. When the Korean Revolutionary Party became invalid in November 1934, the Korean Revolutionary Army government was established by integrating the administrative organization, the National People's Prefecture, and the military organization, the Korean Revolutionary Army. Meanwhile, between 1930 and 1934, the Korean Independence Army under the Korean Independence Party was active in northern Manchuria .

== Establishment of the Korean Revolutionary Army ==
The Korean Revolutionary Army was initially an independent army under the National People's Prefecture. In September 1929, the central council of National People's Government decided to transfer the independence army to the National Unity Party Organization Alliance (民族唯一黨組織同盟), and the command was changed.

In December of that year, the National Unity Party Organizational Alliance was reorganized into the Korean Revolutionary Party (朝鮮革命黨), and the Independence Army became affiliated with it, and the Korean Revolutionary Party made its affiliated independence army independent as the 'Joseon Revolutionary Army'.

== Organization ==
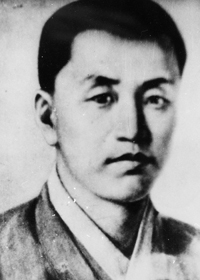
Yang Se-bong, 2nd commander-in-chief of the Korean Revolutionary Army

The parent body of the revolutionary army was six volunteer army units under the Righteous Government, to which 20 new units were added. At first, it was organized into 10 units and stationed in each province.

- 1st Commander Lee Dong -hoon (李東勳) Gwandong, Gwanseo region
- 2nd Commander Jang Cheol-ho (張喆鎬) South China, East China region
- 3rd Commander Yoo Gwang-heul (柳光屹) Jipdong (輯東), Jipseo (輯西) region
- 4th Commander Lee Yun-hwan (李允煥) Hwanin (桓仁), Mubon (撫本), Heunggyeong (興京) region
- Part of the collection of the 5th chapter, Yang Se-bong (梁世奉), Tongnam region
- 6th Commander Kim Mun -geo (金文據) Yuha, Haewon region
- 7th Commander Jo Woong-geol (趙雄杰) Hwajeon (樺甸), Fusong (撫松), Banseok (磐石) region
- 8th Commander Kwon Yeongjo (權永祚) Gilaek, Osang, Ando region
- 9th Commander Anpung (安鵬) Jilin (吉林), Gilseo (吉西), Hoedeok (懷德) region: Successor Lee Jong-rak (李鍾洛)
- 10th Commander Kim Gyeong- geun (金敬勤) Changbai (長白), Linjiang (臨江) region

When the Korean Revolutionary Army became independent in December 1929, a military committee was organized by electing representatives from each unit as the leading body of the revolutionary army. The military committee consisted of Lee Jin-tak as commander-in-chief, Yang Se-bong as deputy commander, and Lee Woong as chief of staff. There were 10,000 troops divided by the existing 10 units were organized into 7 units. On August 8, 1930, the Central Executive Committee reorganized the Korean Revolutionary Army into a central system.

1st to 5th Company Commanders:

1. Kim Bo-an
2. Yang Se-bong
3. Lee Yun-hwan
4. Kim Mun-geo
5. Lee Jong- rak.

== Promotion of Korea-China joint operation ==
While the Korean Independence Army formed an allied force with the Chinese army in northern Manchuria and waged an anti-Japanese battle, in southern Manchuria, the Korean Revolutionary Army under the Korean Revolutionary Party established a separate operation as a Korean-Chinese alliance and waged an anti-Japanese war. When Japan caused the September 18 Incident in 1931, the Korean Revolutionary Party realized the need to establish a joint Korean-Chinese front and consulted with the Chinese authorities with Kim Hak -gyu (金學奎) and Kim I-dae (金履大) as party representatives.

Yang Yin went to Shenyang and consulted with the Chinese People's Foreign Affairs Association and Chinese civilian leaders. The main issues discussed were the nationality of Koreans living in Korea and the joint anti-Japanese issue between Koreans and Chinese people.

Hyeon Ik-cheol, chairman of the Central Executive Committee of the Korean Revolutionary Party, fleshed out this discussion and created the "Eastern-Korean Correctional Policy" and the "Opinion on China-Korea-Korea Collaboration" to be approved by the Chinese authorities. It was sent to, and the Chinese side enthusiastically approved it. However, before this joint operation could be concreted, discussions were halted as Hyeon Ik-cheol was arrested by the Japanese police. Moreover, in December 1931, when the officials of the Joseon Revolutionary Party and the Revolutionary Army were holding a meeting of executives in Sinbin County, they were ambushed by police and killed Lee Ho-won, Kim Kwan-woong, and Lee Jong- geon among the 30 executives in the meeting room. The joint operation could not be promoted due to the fatal blow of the arrest of about 10 important executives, including Lee Jeong- gyeong, Jang Se -yong, Park Chi -hwa, and Lee Gyu-seong.

In the meantime, mid-level executives such as Yang Ki -ha, Yang Se-bong, and Go I-heo remained unfazed and rallied their members to maintain a fighting stance.

=== Collaboration with Liaoning District National Assembly ===
April 20, 1932, on April 20, 1932, Dang Chi -oh, Wang Yukmun, Son Suam, Jang Jong -ju, Lee Chun -yun, Wang Bong -gak, Seodaesan, etc. In this anti-Japanese city, the Liaoning District National Assembly was held high in the air and the Liaoning District National Assembly was formed to plan an anti-Japanese campaign. The National Assembly also had political and military committees, and Wang Yuwen was appointed as the chairman of the standing committee and political committee, and Tang Cuo was appointed as chairman of the military committee and commander-in-chief of the Liaoning People's Self-Defense Force.

The Liaoning People's Self-Defense Force, an anti-Manchurian anti-Japanese armed force, has 52 headquarters under the general headquarters, including Hwanin, Tonghwa, Xinbin, Zean, Linjiang, Yuha, Bongye, Huinam, and Haeryong., Dongfeng, Westpeng, Andong, Bongseong, Cheongwon, Donggang, Changbaek, Ando, Geumcheon, Banseok, West An), Gwanjeon, and Gaewon (開原) and over 20 prefectures, and was the first anti-Japanese corps in Manchuria, commanding 200,000 troops. The Joseon Revolutionary Party planned to build a united front with them, appointed Kim Hak-gyu as the party and military representative, and dispatched him to the National Salvation Congress. Kim Hak-gyu went to Hwaninseong and negotiated with Wang Yu-moon and Tang Cuo and agreed to form a Korea-China united front.

According to this agreement, a special task force command in charge of special missions and a propaganda battalion in charge of propaganda missions were established within the Self-Defense Forces, and the Korean Revolutionary Army was responsible for both. The special task force headquarters was located in Tonghwaseong (通化城), Yang Se-bong was appointed commander, and Kim Gwang-ok (金光玉) became the head of the propaganda battalion. In addition, the Korean Propaganda Department was established within the National Salvation Association's Propaganda Department and published Korean-language publications and newspapers 『Jobjak (合作)』.

The Special Forces Command had eight special forces and carried out special operations in various parts of Manchuria and Korea, and acted as a vanguard unit in battle.

In order to recruit soldiers, the Korean Revolutionary Army Attached Military Academy was established and operated in Gangjeon, Tonghua, and 2,000 people received training. Worker-peasant training centers were opened within each special unit's jurisdiction and military training was provided to Korea's rural youth. Approximately 50,000 students who attended the training were reserve troops for the revolutionary army, and 2,000 students who graduated from the military officer academy became candidate officers for the revolutionary army.

== Korea-China Joint Operations ==
In February 1932, Yang Ki-ha's unit of the Korean Revolutionary Army stationed in Guanjeon County was ambushed by a combined unit of the Japanese police and Manchurian army in Chosan, North Pyongan Province, and Yang Ki-ha was killed in a fierce battle. Afterwards, Yang Se-bong was appointed commander-in-chief of the revolutionary army and commanded the troops.

=== Battle of Yonglinga ===
On March 11, 1932, Yang Se-bong, commander-in-chief of the revolutionary army, led three companies commanded by Chief of Staff Kim Hak- gyu and company commanders Jo Hwa-seon, Choi Yun-gu, and Jeong Bong-gil, and attacked Wang Dong-heon of the Chinese Volunteer Army.), joined with Yang Seok-bok's unit and marched from Wangchengmun in Xinbin toward Cheongeumchae in Musun. On the 12th, they arrived at Duryeongji (陡嶺地) south of Xinbin and camped. At this time, the Japanese army guarding Sinbinhyeonseong Fortress, which detected this information, armed themselves with heavy weapons and occupied the surrounding hills, underestimated the power of the revolutionary army and attacked with mortars and machine guns. The revolutionary army, which was familiar with the surrounding geography, recaptured the surrounding hills that the Japanese army had controlled within an hour of the engagement and launched a fierce attack, defeating the Japanese army. When the Japanese army retreated due to the momentum of the revolutionary army carrying out an assault war, the revolutionary army continued to pursue the Japanese army and occupied Yongling Street (永陵街城), located about 30 ri west of Xinbin Castle (currently Yongling Town, Xinbin Manchurian Autonomous County, Fushun City). They pursued the chase and occupied the Shangxia River. In a battle that lasted for five days, the Japanese army was defeated, suffering countless casualties and abandoning its horses and weapons. In the first Korea-China joint battle, the Allied forces achieved significant results, captured a lot of loot, and the bond was further strengthened.

Around April and May, Choi Yun-gu, Cho Hwa-seon, and Cho Hwa-seon annihilated about 80 Japanese and Manchurian soldiers in the battle of Lee Chun-yun and Sinbinhyeon Noseong Fortress. Choi Yun-gu, Cho Hwa-seon, and Lee Chun-yun engaged in a battle with the Japanese army at Yeongneungga for two days. And as a military strategic tactic, the domestic vacuum was not stopped to strike the military power of the Japanese army. Park Dae-ho and Choi Chang-gang of the Korean Revolutionary Army attacked guard posts and military bases while crossing the border in the Gwanjeon-hyeon and Jipani areas. According to statistics, in 1932, the Korean Revolutionary Army conducted a total of 16 domestic vacuum operations and the number of participants participated. reached 101 people.

=== Battle of Heunggyeongseong ===
On May 8, 1933, when 1,500 Japanese and Manchurian troops attacked Yongneungga again, the Allied forces counterattacked and repulsed them after two days of fierce fighting, but each unit of the Allied forces was dispersed in various places and was forced to retreat. The Japanese army again attacked Linjiang, Hwanin, Xinbin, Yuha, and Huinam provinces, and also advanced to Tonghua, the Chinese army's stronghold. The Chinese army was unable to resist the Japanese army due to a lack of weapons and poor training, and after a few days of fierce fighting, they abandoned their currency and retreated to the forest area of the Mengjiang River. The Japanese army, which had won several victories, mobilized a large unit on June 15 and attacked Yangdaeryeong (楊臺嶺) and other places such as Heunggyeong and Cheongwon. Accordingly, 1,000 revolutionary troops defended Cheongwon under the command of Commander-in-Chief Yang Se-bong, and the Chinese army planned to defend Heunggyeong with 10,000 troops. The revolutionary army launched a surprise attack on the Japanese army and wiped out a large number of enemy troops, but had no way to deal with the bombing from the air by Japanese military planes. About 30 people, including Lee Hae-cheon, Kim Il-ryong, and Park Seok-won, were killed, and hundreds of non - combatants were sacrificed . Even the Chinese army defending Heunggyeong was defeated, and the Joseon Revolutionary Army was forced to retreat to Namsanseong Fortress.

=== Battle of Seokin-gu ===
On July 7, the Japanese army attacked the Korean Revolutionary Army headquarters in Seokin-gu, Yeongneung-ga again. Thanks to the heroic fighting of Commander-in-Chief Yang Se-bong and the support of the Harmonious Line Unit of the 3rd Road Army, the revolutionary army killed about 40 workers and captured one heavy artillery piece, three light machine guns, and about 80 rifles. In mid-July, the Korean-Chinese combined forces attacked a Japanese regiment occupying Nogudae, Fushun County. The Japanese army was defeated in a fierce battle that lasted for two days.

=== Battle of Tonghwahyeon ===
Afterwards, when a battalion of the Japanese army attacked Choi Yun-gu's unit of the 4th Route Army stationed in Tonghwa-hyeon, the 4th Route Army repulsed the enemy with the support of the 3rd Route Army, but the enemy fled with about 80 casualties. However, the Japanese army's attack, which had superior troops and firepower, was persistent. They constantly attacked our troops, and even more so, aircraft attacks pushed our troops into a corner. Although the Korean-Chinese combined forces had excellent morale and combat experience, it was difficult to suppress the enemy due to their inferior firepower and lack of aircraft. In the battle with the Japanese army, which attacked tenaciously and compressed the siege in all directions, they gradually found themselves at a disadvantage, and as time passed, the morale of the Allied forces deteriorated. The enemies posted a poster and offered a bounty at the Bongcheon Guard Headquarters in Manchukuo to capture the leaders of the anti-Japanese armed forces in the Liaodong region. Wang Bong-gak (Chinese) Yang Se-bong offered a bounty of 20,000 won, and Park Dae-ho, Choi Yun-gu, Cho Hwa-seon, and Han Geom-chu offered a bounty of 10,000 won.

== Assassination of Yang Se-bon ==
In the night of September 19, 1934, a man named Park Chang-hae (朴昌海), who was a secret agent for the Japanese military, bribed a Chinese man named Mr. Wang, who was close to Commander-in-Chief Yang Se-bong, and lured him into telling him that the Chinese commander would request to meet Yang Se-bong to discuss military issues. After receiving Mr. Wang's message, Commander-in-Chief Yang Se-bong followed Mr. Wang with four members, including his adjutant Kim Gwang-wook, Kim Seong-hae, Choi Chang-hae, and Kim Chu - sang . While the group was on their way to Darabjagu (大拉子溝), dozens of camouflaged Japanese soldiers suddenly jumped out from the left and right sorghum fields and surrounded the group. At this time, Mr. Wang changed his attitude, pointed a gun at Yang Se-bong's chest, and said, "I am not Mr. Wang of the past. "If you don't want to take these bullets, surrender to the Japanese," he shouted. Yang Se-bong was determined that everything would be final and scolded Mr. Wang for his actions, and the Japanese army shot Yang Se-bong and his companions dead.

== Military government ==
After the assassination of Commander-in-Chief Yang Se-bong, Kim Hwal-seok (金活石) took over as Commander-in-Chief of the Korean Revolutionary Army and reorganized the army into a military government called the Korean Revolutionary Army Government on November 11, 1934. They established a national song, a year of fighting, fighting against the Japanese military, a military training center with four famous names, a military training camp, and military training. The military government had seven departments, including legal affairs, civil affairs, finance, foreign affairs, culture, special affairs, and military, and divided the province into nine counties. In the military department, Commander-in-Chief Kim Hwal-seok concurrently served as head of the department.

At the time of Commander-in-Chief Kim Hwal-seok (real name: 金鐸), the military force was much reduced compared to the time of Commander-in-Chief Yang Se-bong. In 1935, when the Japanese army's major subjugation operation in Chugye began, in September, Han Geomchu, the 1st commander of the Korean Revolutionary Army, held a meeting with Wang Bong-gak, commander of the Chinese Self-Defense Forces, in Jianhyeon and organized the Korea-China Anti-Japanese Alliance. The alliance council was composed of Go Yi-heo as chairman of the political committee, Wang Bong- gak as chairman of the military committee, and Han Geom -chu as commander-in-chief of the army.

In 1936, the Korean Revolutionary Army government convened a meeting, canceled the local army, organized it into three companies, and appointed Han Geomchu (real name: 崔錫鏞), Choi Yun-gu (real name: 崔鉉九), and Cho Hwa-seon (real name: 趙京福) as commanders, respectively. At this time, the total number of troops was about 300. However, a large-scale subjugation by 10,000 troops was launched, and defectors came one after another. In 1937, Ko Yi-he (real name: 崔龍成) was arrested and sentenced to death. At this time, the Korean Revolutionary Army was in trouble due to the defection of Han Geom-chu, a member of the Yun Il faction, and the defection of the Korean Revolutionary Army. After April 1937, the Commander-in-Chief of the Joseon Revolutionary Army, Kim Hwal-seok, along with the 7th Division Commander, Jeong Gwang-ho, were arrested and surrendered to the Andong Public Office of Manchukuo. I said. Moreover, it became very difficult for the Korean Revolutionary Army. However, we could not give up the war against Japan. There was no choice but for Park Dae-ho and Choi Yun-gu to lead about 60 members and join the Northeast Anti-Japanese Alliance led by Yang Jeong-woo.

However, Choi Yun-gu, Park Dae-ho, etc. established the Korean Independence Company under the 1st Army of the Anti-Japanese Alliance, and Choi Yun-gu took command and Park Dae-ho fought the Japanese as a staff member. At this time, as the Japanese army's large-scale subjugation operation was carried out, defectors began to appear one after another in the anti-Japanese coalition. Officers Jeong Bin, Choi Ju-bong, and Yoon Ha-tae, who had already surrendered to the Japanese army, joined the punitive force and pursued Yang Jeong-woo's unit of the 1st Anti-Japanese Allied Forces, destroying the Anti-Japanese Allied Forces in the areas of Hwajeon, Mengjiang, Linjiang, and Changbai.

The last commander-in-chief of the Korean Revolutionary Army, Kim Hwal-seok (金活石) and Moon Moo-gyeong (文武卿), and most of the executives of the Korean Revolutionary Government defected to the Japanese in April 1937, and 400 of their subordinates were disarmed. The Korean Revolutionary Army should be seen as virtually destroyed at this time.

Nevertheless, former members of the Korean Revolutionary Army fought back and recorded a record of annihilating about 100 enemies in slash-and-burn fields. However, on February 15, 1940, in the Boan Village of Menggang County (Jeongwoo County), Jilin Province, the battalion commander Choi Yun-gu and his members were annihilated (killed), and eight days later on February 23, Yang Jeong-woo, commander of the 1st Army of the Northeast Anti-Japanese Alliance, was also killed. By 1942, the Anti-Japanese Alliance was annihilated. Some of the soldiers who escaped alive went to the Soviet Union. Kim Il Sung also fled to the Soviet Union around October 1940. Park Dae-ho and others, former members of the Joseon Revolutionary Army, were plotting to join forces with the Korean Liberation Army in Nanjing until early 1943, but Park Dae-ho was arrested by the Japanese punitive force by a traitor on Cheongmyeong Day, 1943, the day he had promised to meet with his comrades. Fusong. He was released from prison after being imprisoned, but died in 1947 from the aftereffects of torture. (The Northeast Anti-Japanese Alliance is an affiliate of the Communist Party of the Chinese regular army and has no relationship with the Korean People's Revolutionary Army, which North Korea claims.)

== See also ==
- Korean Independence Movement
  - List of militant Korean independence activist organizations
- Korean National Revolutionary Party
- Korean nationalism
- Korean Revolutionary Party

== Bibliography ==
- History of Korean Independence Movement Volume 4, War of Independence > III. The Korean-Chinese Union and the War against Japan > 3. The Anti-Japanese War of the Korean-Chinese Allied Forces and the Sufferings of the Independence Army > 1) Formation of the Korean Independence Army and the Korean Revolutionary Army (Commission on National History, December 30, 1988), Korean History Database
- January 19, 1931, the 6th year of the reign of Sohwa, a matter regarding the situation of Koreans in Jilin region in the 5th year of the reign of Sohwa Independence Movement History Collection 10 Independence Army Combat History Collection (Independence Meritorious Persons Project Fund Management Committee, 1976) p. 476: Merit Electronic Archives
- Jang Se-yoon, Research on the Joseon Revolutionary Army『Study on the History of the Korean Independence Movement』 Vol. 4, (Independence Hall of the Korean Independence Movement Research Institute, 1990)
- Jang Se-yoon (張世胤), Jae Man (在滿) The establishment of the Joseon Revolutionary Party and the characteristics of its main members 『Study on the History of the Korean Independence Movement』 Vol. 10, (Independence Hall, Korean Independence Movement History Research Institute, 1996)
- Jang Se-yoon (張世胤), Research on the Joseon Revolutionary Army Government 『Study on the History of the Korean Independence Movement』 Vol. 11, (Independence Hall of Korea Research Institute of the History of the Korean Independence Movement, 1997)
- Jang Se-yoon (張世胤), Research on Kookminbu - Focusing on establishment, charter, and autonomous activities - 『Study on the History of the Korean Independence Movement』 Vol. 12 (Independence Hall of the Korean Independence Movement Research Institute, 1998) pp. 83–124
- Jang Se-yoon, Study on the anti-Japanese armed struggle of the Korean Independence Army 『Research on the History of the Korean Independence Movement』 Vol. 3, (Independence Hall Korean Independence Movement Research Institute, 1989)
- Independence Movement History Collection 10: Independence Army Fighter History Collection / Breaking News on Documents on the Organization of the Provisional Government of the Republic of Korea / April 25, 8th year of Daejeong / Action of Bulyeong Seon-in(Independence Meritorious Service Fund Management Committee, 1976) pp. 599~600: Merit Electronic Archives
