= Anarchism in Korea =

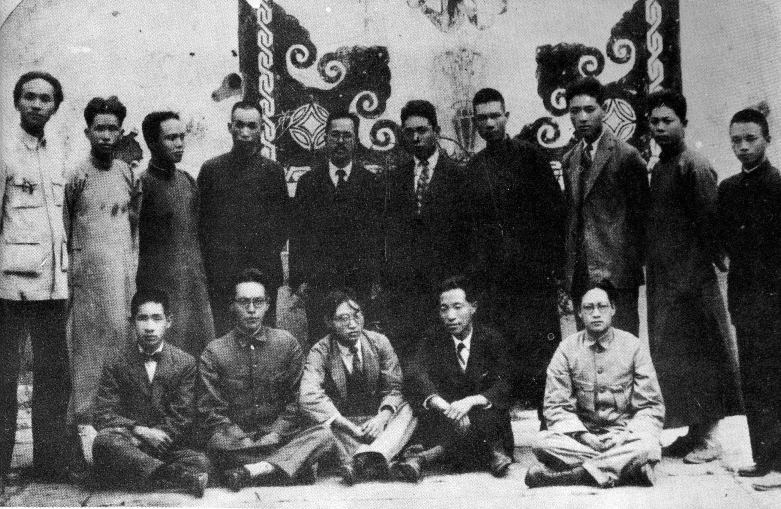
Founding members of the KPAM in 1928

Anarchism in Korea dates back to the Korean independence movement in Korea under Japanese rule (1910–1945). Korean anarchists federated across their end of the continent, including forming groups on the Japanese mainland and in Manchuria, but their efforts were perforated by regional and world wars.

== History ==
During the later Joseon period, a number of precursors to anarchism emerged from the works of Korean Neo-Confucianism. Chŏng Yagyong advocated for a type of anarcho-communism called a "village-land system", in which land was held under common ownership, everyone contributes "from each according to their ability, to each according to their needs", and the redistribution of income and wealth is carried out between villages. Choe Je-u pursued a humanist and egalitarian philosophy known as "Donghak", which held that "Man is Heaven". In 1894, these egalitarian ideas were put into practice during the Donghak Peasant Revolution.

=== Gestation period ===
Japan's occupation of Korea in 1910 encouraged a national liberation movement whose more radical proponents gravitated towards anarchism. Following the 1919 independence struggle led by the March 1st Movement, following and during which 7,500 people were killed, a large number of Koreans emigrated to Manchuria, forming independent communities there.

In 1923, Sin Chaeho released his "Declaration of the Korean Revolution", which cautioned Koreans against replacing one oppressor with another, or becoming a society that would exploit another. He pushed for the revolution to guarantee new freedoms and material improvements, not just the removal of foreign control. The Korean anarchists named their newspaper Talhwan (Reconquest) and advocated for anarcho-communism. The Japanese ruling class took a reactionary view towards anarchists and Koreans, blaming them for an earthquake in Tokyo that same year.

=== Organizational period ===
Sin Chaeho joined other Korean anarchists in creating the Eastern Anarchist Federation (EAF) while he was in exile in 1927. The EAF had members across China, Japan, and Vietnam. Anarcho-syndicalists were also active in organizing trade unions in Busan.

Manchuria, in particular, became the breeding ground for the new anarchist movement of Korea, as the short-lived Korean People's Association in Manchuria (KPAM), which was an autonomous anarchist zone in Manchuria, close to the Korean border, declared its formation in 1929. The KPAM was organized on the principles of federalism, a gift economy and mutual aid, and is still regarded as one of the most important developments in Korean anarchism.

=== Post-war period ===
Following the end of World War II, Korea was the first region in Asia to see a sizable anarchist movement, given that state communism was present in China and repression of socialist beliefs were widespread in American occupied Japan. While the Korean Anarchist Federation opposed a united national front before the war, during the war, some anarchists joined their exiled government in the fight for independence. Some anarchists encouraged an alliance with the government to protect Korea against foreign invaders, and others continued to advocate for a federation of autonomous units across the country. After the war, workers and peasants began a process of social reconstruction through independent unions, but this process was stunted by the imposition of government from foreign forces (the United States and Soviet Union) in 1948, which led to the Korean War in the 1950s.

== Modern analysis ==
Many different groups and individuals have discussed the characteristics of early Korean anarchism, and whether it diverged from what these groups regard as the anarchist ideal, specifically the nationalist and racially motivated tendencies present within groups as well as individuals within the movement. There has been critique from, among others, Dongyoun Hwang and Henry Em, that the traditional Western conception of anarchist ideology is in the way of a full understanding of the group's aims, as well as the belief that many Western anarchists attempt to romanticize the group and its aims. This modern understanding of a multifaceted Korean anarchism, that is not strictly based on the works of traditional anarchist theorists, but also on national independence from the Japanese, is echoed in the contemporary quote from the Korean-Chinese anarchist Sim Yongcheol:

"Korean anarchists, since they were slaves who lost their country, had to rely with affection on nationalism and patriotism and thus had difficulties in practice in discerning which was their main idea and which was their secondary idea. The reason was due to that their enemy was the only one – Japanese imperialism. My life is one that has drifted along with this kind of contradiction inside."

== See also ==
- Category:Korean anarchists
- List of anarchist movements by region
- Anarchism in China
- Anarchism in Japan
- Communism in Korea

== Bibliography ==
- Crump, John (1996). "Anarchism and Nationalism in East Asia". Anarchist Studies. 4. Lawrence & Wishart: 45–64. ISSN 0967-3393. OCLC 843017149.
- Em, Henry H. (1999). "Nationalism, Post-Nationalism, and Shin Ch'ae-ho" (PDF). Korea Journal. 39 (2): 283–317. ISSN 0023-3900. OCLC 781625770. Archived (PDF) from the original on 2024-05-06.
- Graham, Robert (2013). Anarchism: A Documentary History of Libertarian Ideas. Vol. 3. Montreal: Black Rose Books. ISBN 978-1-55164-337-3. OCLC 824655763.
- Hwang, Dongyoun (2010). "Korean Anarchism Before 1945: A regional and transnational approach". In Hirsch, Steven; van der Walt, Lucien (eds.). Anarchism and Syndicalism in the Colonial and Postcolonial World, 1870–1940. Studies in Global Social History. Vol. 6. Leiden: Brill. pp. 95–129. ISBN 978-90-04-18849-5. ISSN 1874-6705. OCLC 1200925424. Archived from the original on 2021-10-22.
- Hwang, Dongyoun (2016). Anarchism in Korea: Independence, Transnationalism, and the Question of National Development, 1919-1984 (PDF). Albany, New York: SUNY Press. ISBN 978-1-4384-6167-0. OCLC 1039293708. Archived (PDF) from the original on 2021-11-11.
- Marshall, Peter H. (2008) [1992]. "Korea". Demanding the Impossible: A History of Anarchism. London: Harper Perennial. pp. 527–528. ISBN 978-0-00-686245-1. OCLC 218212571.
- MacSimoin, Alan (2005) [1997]. The Korean Anarchist Movement (PDF). Sacramento, California: Black Powder Press. OCLC 234309540. Archived (PDF) from the original on 2019-03-16.
- Park, Sonyoung (2018). "Anarchism and Culture in Colonial Korea: Minjung Revolution, Mutual Aid, and the Appeal of Nature". Cross-Currents (28). University of California: 93–115. ISSN 2158-9666. OCLC 7954136715. Archived from the original on 2021-05-12.
