= Korean Independence Army =

1920–1921 Korean militant activist group

- Leader: Hong Beom-do
- Founded: 1919
- Dissolved: June 1921
- Country: Korea
- Allegiance: Provisional Government of the Republic of Korea
- Headquarters: Antuhyun; Fengwudong, Wang Qinghyun, China; Mt. Mirsan
- Ideology: Korean nationalism
- Size: 600

- Korean Independence Army
- Hangul: 대한독립군
- Hanja: 大韓獨立軍
- RR: Daehan dongnipgun
- MR: Taehan tongnipkun

The Korean Independence Army (Korean: 대한독립군) was an independent military force organized in Northern Jiandao (Gando) in 1919 and led by Hong Beom-do, a former gunner. This unit played major roles in defeating the Japanese in the Battle of Fengwudong and Battle of Qingshanli.

== Background ==
Hong led the Korean Righteous Army to several victories, beginning in 1907, at Gaksan, Samsu, and Bukcheong. These successes eventually led to increased attacks by the Japanese Army, which caused the Korean Independence Army to withdraw in 1910 to Primorsky and Kando. From a safer location inside Russia, Hong continued his campaign against the Japanese. In August 1918, when Japan invaded Primorsky in support of the White Army during the Russian civil war, Hong formed a military force centered around the former Korean Independence Army and Korean people living in Manchuria.

== Organization ==
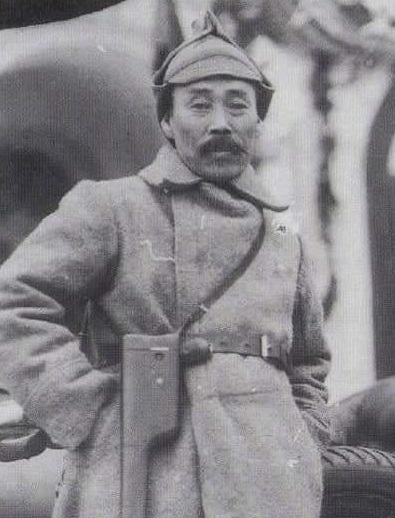
Hong Beom-do in 1921

When the March 1st Movement took place in 1919, Hong and his soldiers moved to Antuhyun. In 1919, the Korean Independence Army established relations with Koreans residing in Yeonggae, Primorsky Krai, and Jiandao (Gando). Starting with the attack on Hyesanjin (a city located on the Yalu River) in August 1919, the military forces led by Hong launched a military campaign against the Japanese forces in northern Korea. However, due to difficulties in supplying his weapons and logistics, in the winter of 1919, he went under the Gando National Association which had great influence in the Korean community in north Jiandao and received financial support. The number of soldiers increased to 600, and combat power was strengthened by equipping 600 military guns, about 30 pistols, and about 200 rounds of ammunition per gun.

The Korean Independence Army, which had established a base in north Jiandao carried out anti-Japanese armed activities together with the National Army, which was under the leadership of the Gando National Association, discussed integration in early 1920 for effective anti-Japanese warfare. On February 21, 1920, Cho An-mu, commander of the National Army, and the Korean Independence Army, who had established a camp in Myeongwol-gu, Yanji County, met in Hamatang, Yanji County to discuss integration for the first time. Then, Choi Jin-dong, commander of the Military Affairs Command, who had a camp in Bongo-dong, Chunhwa-hyang, Wangcheong-hyeon, joined in for three days from March 8 to 10, and on March 25. In March 1920, the three armies joined forces, and during this time they lived and operated in the area of Nosuando.

=== Main Activities ===
Korean Independence Army carried out large-scale operations to enter the country was carried out in conjunction with the Military Affairs Command in December 1919 and March 1920, respectively. They called for legitimacy of the independence army's armed struggle, and was widely publicized by issuing a statement of death and a warning, while also prohibiting other small organizations from collecting various nominal donations in the base area.

The independence army then moved their base from Antuhyun to Fengwudong, Wang Qinghyun, China and received financial support from the Gando National Association for a larger domestic resistance operation. The military's finances and administration were managed by the association. Around 200 old righteous soldiers and old farmers and laborers from Jiandao, centering on Hong beom-do, purchased weapons from various places to train the independence army. Hong allied with the Military Affairs Command, led by Choi Jin-dong, who had been stationed in Hoeryong and Jongseong (Wongseong) along the Tuman coast of the Tuman River.

They continued to receive reinforcements, weapons, and resources from Jiandao, Korea, and Primorsky Krai. In early September 1919, Gu Chun-seon led the Gando National Association to provide financial and human support. Afterwards, soldiers continued to be conscripted and recruited, the size of the unit grew, and the system and equipment were improved to a significant level. The army also showed force by giving a stern warning to Korean police assistants and other secret agents operating in the area.

=== Joining the Korean Northern Army Command ===
They met on Sunday, April 22, and then on May 3, 1920, the Gando National Association held a joint military operation with other Korean military and resistance forces such as the Korean Democratic Corps in Wangchunhyeon Poomdong. Then they met on May 7, and May 15 and tried to find an agreement for integration. However, despite their efforts, they were unable to unify their policies and ideologies and were unable to form a unified body, so they agreed to form a union with the National Army, and the Military Affairs Command. Thus, on May 22, 1920, they formed the Korean Northern Army Command, an alliance of north Jiandao independence forces. The Korean Northern Army Command orchestrated many of the subsequent activities, specifically being in charge of administration, politics, and finances. Hong Beom-do became the head of the Korean Northern Army Command and was in charge of the military forces. The Korean rebels were assembled into four groups under the leadership of Yi Cheon-oh, Kang Sang-mo, Kang Si-beom, and Jo Kwon-dong.

== Battles ==
In August 1919, the Korean Independence Army crossed the Yalu River and wiped out a Japanese military unit. This was the first domestic military operation to take place in Korea following the March 1st Movement. In October, Hong's forces once again moved into Korea, occupied Ganggye and Manpojin, fighting a fierce battle with the Japanese army in Jaseong county, northern Korea. By March 1920, Hong was allied with the Military Affairs Command, who had been stationed in Hoeryong and Jongseong (Wongseong) along the Tuman coast of the Tuman River. 2,000 Korean independence fighters in the Jilin area attacked the camp of the Japanese army at night, killing 300 people and routing 400 while developing an independence movement while maintaining organic contact with the Military Affairs Command and others. After March 1920, Hong and Choi led the Korean Northern Army Command in the northern area of Manchuria. The domestic resistance operation of the Korean independence forces provided a boost to the national spirit of Koreans everywhere and prompted further armed resistance struggles in Manchuria.

=== Battle of Samdunja ===
On June 4, 1920, an independence army unit of the Korean Democratic Corps, commanded by Park Seung-gil, entered Gangyang-dong, Jongseong-gun, and Hamgyeongbuk-do and surprised and lured a Japanese patrol platoon, and the Japanese army's Namyang Garrison attacked. Then they entered Jaseong County, Korea and ambushed a Japanese army patrol in Samdungja. In retaliation, the Japanese army occupied Nanam-dong (now Cheongjin) in North Hamgyeong-do of the Japanese 19th Division headquarter base.

=== Battle of Fengwudong ===
It was a large-scale battle that took place from June 6 to June 7, 1920, between the Korean Independence Army, the allied forces of the Independence Army units led by Choi Jin-dong and Choi Choi, and the Japanese army. The Japanese army formed a Wolgang pursuit party led by Major Yasukawa Jiro and advanced to Bongo-dong, which was the base of the independence army at the time. The combined forces of the Independence Army, centered on the Korean Independence Army, were waiting in the Bongo-dong Valley and achieved victory through a surprise attack. The damage on the Japanese army was 157 killed and 300 wounded, and the damage on the independence army was 4 killed and 2 wounded. This was an overwhelming victory to the extent that the Provisional Government Ministry of Military Affairs declared this battle as ‘the first round of the War of Independence’. The Japanese military had been thinking of the independence army as a militia that could be suppressed at any time, but the crushing defeat served as an opportunity to consider the independence army as a major obstacle to colonial rule, and to seek fundamental measures against the independence army. After losing this battle, a large number of troops were mobilized to attack the independence army. In response to this, the independence army moved to Cheongsan-ri and united with the Korean Northern Military Command.

=== Battle of Cheongsanri ===
On July 11, he led a small unit and attacked the Japanese consulate in Jiandao in Ludugu, engaged in a battle with the Japanese consulate police, and won with many casualties. This was widely reported, and Japan put pressure on China, unilaterally notifying China that it would station troops there for about two months and deploying about 15,000 Japanese troops across the Duman River. It was a unit formed by combining the Nanam Garrison, Yongsan Garrison, and Siberian Garrison. In order to prevent the independence army's continued movement into the country, the Japanese established a plan to subdue the Gando independence army, intentionally caused the Hunchun Incident in early October 1920, and began dispatching large-scale regular troops to the Jiandao area. Around this time, many independence armies moved to other places to avoid direct confrontation with the Japanese army. In fear of retaliation from the Japanese Empire, 600 members of the Korean Independence Army moved to Noryeong and then to Milsan (密山) in Heilongjiang Province. This was intended to maintain military capabilities rather than face direct confrontation with regular Japanese troops, which had superior military power.

In the process of moving to Milsan, about 2,000 independence forces, including the Korean Independence Army led by Hong Beom-do, Kim Jwa-jin's Northern Military Administration Office, and Cho An-mu's National Army, united and fought in Hwaryonghyeon, upstream of the Duman River, from October 21 to 26. He achieved military success by defeating over 5,000 Japanese soldiers. This battle, which lasted for 6 days and inflicted a heavy blow on the Japanese army, which was more than twice as large, is the Battle of Cheongsanri.

This is a battle in which the Northern Korean Military Office and the Korean Independence Army, led by Kim Jwa-jin, who moved their base near Cheongsan-ri, united and won against the Japanese army. The Northern Road Military Office was originally located in the mountainous area of West Daeba District, Wangqing County, Jilin Province, but when the Chinese government, unable to withstand pressure from Japan, forced it to leave, it was moved to Cheongsanri. Over a period of about a week from October 21 to 26, 1920, the Japanese army was defeated after about 10 skirmishes, including the Battle of Baekunpyeong, the Battle of Wanlu-gu, and the Battle of Gapsanchon. The combined strength of the Independence Army is approximately 1,950 people, and the strength of the Japanese army is known to be around 29,000 to 40,000 people. Around October 16, the combined forces of Hong Beom-do and Anmu moved north again and marched to Eorangchon, where they were strengthening military training every day while preparing for an encounter with the Japanese army. Around October 18, many independence army units gathered. Kim Jwa-jin's unit was hesitant to retreat as it continued to monitor the movements of the Japanese army. It believed that even if it retreated, it would not be able to escape the Japanese army's pursuit, so it decided to engage in a direct battle with the Japanese army. On the afternoon of October 21, 1920, the Japanese army was in Ido-gu. Hong Beom also came in to surround the unit. Accordingly, the independence army fought stubbornly until dawn on October 22 . Hong Beom-do's unit was once surrounded by Japanese troops attacking north and south, but quickly escaped. The Japanese soldiers were panicking, shooting among themselves in the darkness, unable to distinguish between the front and the back. In the end, Hong Beom-do's unit killed about 400 Japanese soldiers and achieved another victory. Then, they concentrated their attack on a unit of the Japanese army that had advanced to the center, and as a result, they succeeded in jointly attacking the Japanese army in the center with other units of the Japanese army. The damage on the Japanese army was 500 killed and 3,300 wounded, and the damage on the independence army was 60 killed and 90 wounded.

== Joining the Korean Independence Corps ==
After being severely defeated in the Battle of Cheongsanri, the Japanese army in retaliation devastated Korean communities, anti-Japanese organizations, schools, and churches, which is called the Gando Massacre or Gyeongshin Disaster. Afterwards, the Korean Independence Army joined the Korean Independence Corps (大韓獨立軍團), which was organized by integrating the independence army units gathered in Misan. The combined unit of the independence army of about 700 people fought a fierce battle with the Japanese army's Jiandao punitive force and crossed the Ussuri River in late January 1921. Then they entered Free City (Svobodny, Russian : Свобо́дный) via Iman, Russian territory. At this time, Korean armed units from various parts of the Maritime Province and the Gando Independence Army were gathering in the Free City area. This is because it was thought that the anti-Japanese war could be carried out effectively by integrating the Korean units scattered in various places and receiving support from the Bolshevik government. However, a fierce competition broke out among the leadership over leadership of the assembled Korean troops.

== Free City Incident and Disbandment ==
On June 28, the leadership of the Korean Revolutionary Military Government Council decided to disarm the Sakhalin Volunteer Army, which was in a stubborn standoff. The Korean Revolutionary Army, which mobilized heavy weapons such as armored vehicles, surrounded the Surasevka area near Svobodny, where the Korean Volunteer Army was stationed, and launched a large-scale attack, resulting in a major conflict between the two sides. This conflict between Korean armed forces, called the Svobodny Incident or Jayu City Incident, resulted in casualties one after another, and the Korean Volunteer Army units were scattered in all directions, greatly damaging the fighting capacity of the independence army. After the Svobodny Incident, many restrictions were imposed on the activities of the Korean armed forces due to the strong control of the Russian Communist Party, and a large number of the leadership left, including General Hong Beom-do, who moved to Kazakhstan in September 1937 in accordance with Stalin's policy of forced migration of Koreans. The Korean Independence Army was disbanded.

== See also ==
- List of militant Korean independence activist organizations
  - Korean Independence Corps
- Battle of Fengwudong
- Battle of Qingshanli
- Free City Incident

== Bibliography ==
- Explanation of Korean history through historical sources: Military sentiment report on the Battle of Cheongsanri
- Korean History: A. A. Cheongsalli Daecheop (great victory at Cheongsalli)
- 7th Curriculum Middle School National History: Foundation of the War of Independence
- 7th Curriculum High School National History: Domestic and International Anti-Japanese National Movement
