= Gando National People's Association =

1920–1921 Korean militant activist group

- Founded: January 1914
- Founder: Koo Chun-seon
- Defunct: April 1921
- Type: Political, military
- Location: Yanji, Jilin Province, China
- Subsidiaries: Korean National Association; North Gangdo National Association; Hunchun National Association; National Army
- Affiliations: Provisional Government of the Republic of Korea

- Gando National People's Association
- Hangul: 간도국민회
- Hanja: 間島國民會
- RR: Gando gungminhoe
- MR: Kando kungminhoe

The Gangdo National People's Association (Korean: 간도국민회) was a group in the Korean independence movement in Manchuria organized in 1914. It was formed in exile during the Japanese occupation of Korea. While focusing on educational movements such as building elementary schools and middle schools, the March 1st Movement in 1919 began full-scale activities.

== Background ==
Initially, the name of the association was Ganmin Autonomous Association (墾民自治會), but the Chinese authorities requested that the word "autonomy" be deleted, so it was renamed Ganminhoe. On January 26, 1913, 25 founders, including Lee Dong-chun and Kim Lip, held a meeting to establish a community association with about 150 people in attendance. On April 26, Baek Ok-bo (白玉甫) was elected as the temporary president of the Ganminhoe General Assembly and held a meeting to establish the Ganminhoe. At this convention, Kim Yak-yeon (金躍淵) was elected as president and Baek Ok-bo was elected as vice president. In addition, executives from nine departments, including the Civil Records Department, Education Department, Law Department, Finance Department, and Food Industry Promotion Department, were appointed. Afterwards, branch offices were established in three counties, including Yanji, Hwaryong, and Wangcheong, and many branches were established under the branches. Accordingly, all matters related to Korean residents were resolved autonomously, and the Chinese government also consulted with the Korean People's Association on the issue of Koreans. In addition, by inspiring patriotism among Korean residents and greatly contributing to the foundation of the independence movement, the North Gando region later became the center of the anti-Japanese armed independence movement.

The March 1st Movement that took place in Korea led the independence movement in the northern Gando region, Yongjeong, eastern Manchuria, and was later reorganized into the Gando Korean National Association. The Uiuibu (議事部), which led the independence demonstration in Yongjeong, later changed its name to the Korean Independence Association (朝鮮獨立期成會), and then changed its name again to the Korean National Association (大韓國民會) when the Provisional Government was organized in Shanghai. Koreans living in provinces felt the need for integration of independence movement groups. So, representatives of each organization gathered together to create an autonomous organization, and for the purpose of independence movement, they integrated and developed it into the Gando National Association, which is affiliated with the Provisional Government of the Republic of Korea.

== Activities ==
The Gando National Association, which actively accepted the command of the Provisional Government, was also active in the unification of independence army units in eastern Manchuria. Accordingly, the National Association organized its own army called the National Army under the command of Cho An-mu (安武) in the spring of 1920. A membership fee of 3 won was collected from each member and used as military funds. In addition, he promoted independence awareness by publishing the Daehanminbo (大韓民報) as an organ magazine. Following the instructions of the Provisional Government, he participated in the first integration conference held in March 1920, and also participated in the integration conference held in Bongo-dong in May. At the meeting, it was decided that the National Association of Korea would perform its role as an administrative agency and that the Korean Northern Army Command would be formed as a military agency. The relationship between the two was also established by deciding that the Korean National Association would 'assist' the Korean Northern Army Command and provide all military affairs.

The Battle of Fengwudong took place from June 4 to 7, and at this time, Hong Beom-do and Choi Jin-dong were in conflict over the issue of retreat in response to the pursuing Japanese army. Accordingly, Choi Jin-dong's military affairs division within the Korean Northern Military Command moved independently. While the conflict was not resolved until early August, the Korean National Association kept pace with Hong Beom-do's Korean Independence Army and competed with Kim Jwa-jin's Northern Military Administration Office and Choi Jin-dong's Military Affairs Command. At the joint meeting on August 10, Choi Jin-dong's Military Affairs Commander-in-Chief completely withdrew from the Korean Northern Army Command. Hong Beom-do joined forces and led the Battle of Cheongsanri to victory with the Northern Military Administration and then returned to the Free City, Russian Maritime Province. Meanwhile, the independence movement groups remaining in North Gando launched a unification movement.

== Organization ==
In January 1920, the Gangdo headquarters was established in Hapmadang, Chunyang-hyang, Yanji-hyeon, with Chairman Koo Chun-seon, Vice-Chairman Kang Gu-woo, Secretary Ko Dong-hwan, Secretary Kim Jeong, and Treasurer Kim Gyu-chan. Kim 圭燦, Security Manager Park Du-hwa, Editor-in-Chief Lee Wan, and Communications Manager Choi Yun-ju were appointed. As the branches increased and the scope of influence grew, the headquarters was changed to the Central General Assembly and moved to Jiinhyang (志仁鄕). There were five local general assemblies and 52 branches. The central general assembly was located in Uiran-gu, Jiin-hyang, Yanji County, with Kang Gu-woo as the chairman, and the eastern regional assembly was located in Hwaryeongchon, Jiin-hyang, Yanji County. The general meeting of the western region is held in Myogu, Sungrye-hyang, Yangil-hyeon, and the general meeting of the southern region is held in Jangjaechon, Jisinsa, Hwaryong-hyeon. The chairman of the meeting was located in the village, and the northern regional general meeting was located in Hapsu-pyeong, Chunhwa-hyang, Wangqing County. Afterwards, 21,000 members of the Hunchun Korean National Association were recruited, and branches were expanded to 80 locations and the number of officers was increased. Koo Chun-seon and Lee Myung-soon were elected as presidents, Vice President Park Gwan-il, and Secretaries Yeo Nam-seop and Oh Jong-beom.吳宗範, Oh Hyeon-gyeong (吳玄慶) was appointed as treasurer.

=== Branches ===
==== Korean National Association ====
There was a Pyongyang headquarters, and each county had a council and each myeon had a local village association to expand the organization. There was Chairman Park In-gwan, Secretary Park Seung-myeong, Councilors Lim Young-seok, Go Jin-han, Hwangbo Deok-sam, and Lee Chi-su, Treasurer Park Chi-rok, and Secretary Jeon Heung-geon. They gathered Christians at Shinyang-ri Theological Seminary in Pyongyang and formed it in September 1919. The purpose was to develop an independence movement centered around Christians, communicating with the Provisional Government of the Republic of Korea in Shanghai. With the approval of the Provisional Government, the Korean National Association independently carried out affairs related to military affairs and finances, and declared itself to be the unification organization of East Manchuria.

==== North Gando National Association ====
The North Gando office, was located in Hamatang, Wangcheng County, Jilin Province, and under it, eight local councils and about 130 branches were established as civil administration agencies. There were 55 executives at the headquarters, including Chairman Koo Chun-seon and Vice Chairman Seo Sang-yong. The North Gangdo National Association carried out the independence movement in connection with the National Association of Maritime Province.

==== Hunchun Korean National Association ====
It was organized on March 31, 1919, after the independence demonstration movement broke out in Hunchun, Manchuria. It was a powerful anti-Japanese movement group formed on the basis of the Christian Friendship Association, which was an organization of Christians in Honchun County. The headquarters was located at the home of Hon Chun-hyeon alumnus Park Bong-sik, and the executives consisted of Chairman Lee Myung-soon, Vice Chairman Park Gwan-il, Secretary Seo Yun-muk, Secretary Yeo Nam-seop, Oh Jong-beom, and Treasurer. They were Oh Hyeon-gyeong (吳玄慶), communications team leader Na Jeong-hwa (羅正化), and social relations manager Hwang Byeong-gil (黃炳吉) . In the event of a rebellion, the command of the organization was to be entrusted to Hwang Byeong-gil. The number of members was 3,000, and the number of members in Hunchun County reached 200.

== National Army ==
Accordingly, the Korean National Association organized its own military called the National Army (Korean: 대한국민회군; Hanja: 大韓國民會軍), with Cho An-mu as the commander leading 450 troops. The 1st company commander was Jo Kwon-sik, the 2nd company commander was Lim Byeong-geuk, and the military affairs committee members were Ma Ryong-ha, Ma Cheon-ryong, Lee Won, and Choi Ki-hak. Choi Yeo-jin) and others. The headquarters of the National Army was near Chunheungchon. A military academy was established in Myeongwol-gu, Yanji County, Manchuria.

The National Association, which actively accepted the command of the Provisional Government, was also active in the unification of independence army units in eastern Manchuria. Following the instructions of the Provisional Government, he participated in the first integration conference held in March 1920, and also participated in the integration conference held in Bongo-dong in May. At the meeting, it was decided that the National Association would perform its role as an administrative agency and that the Military Affairs Command would be formed as a military agency. The relationship between the two was also established by deciding that the National Association would 'assist' the Korean Northern Army Command and provide all military affairs. The Korean Northern Army Command, organized four units under the command of Commander Cho An-mu. There were 100 soldiers in each unit, and the 1st commander Choi Moon-mu, the 2nd commander Hong Beom-do, the 3rd commander Kang Seung-beom, and the 4th commander Jo Kwon-sik were appointed. In addition, military funds were used to develop anti-Japanese armed struggle. There were three activities per week.

The National Association mainly raised military funds and organized about 300 independent armed forces trained under the guidance of Cho An-Mu and 600 people under Hong Beom-do into the Korean Independence Army under the direct control of the National Association and placed them under the leadership of Hong Beom-do. In addition, armed groups throughout Gando were integrated and joint assistance was provided in purchasing weapons and training independent forces. After integration, the camp was reorganized with Choi Jin-dong (崔振東) as the commander, Choi as the adjutant, and Hong Beom-do as the regiment commander, and carried out the most active domestic invasion operations, winning a major victory in the Battle of Bongo-dong. Afterwards, on October 20, the North Gando Independence Army units of Hong Beom-do of the 1st Regiment, Kim Jwa-jin of the 2nd Regiment, and Choi Jin-dong of the 3rd Regiment contributed greatly to the Battle of Cheongsanri with the support of the Gando National Association.

On October 29, 1920, as an independence movement group, under the direction of the Provisional Government of the Republic of Korea, as a result of the Unification Movement, it was integrated with the Ganbuk Daehan People's Association, Daehan Shinmindan, and Daehan Gwangbokdan. A department was organized.

=== Equipment ===
According to Japanese police data, in mid-August 1920, the National Army had 600 rifles, 70,000 rounds of ammunition, 160 pistols, and 120 grenades.

== Dissolution ==
After the Battle of Cheongsanri, the Imperial Japanese Army sought revenge over the previous defeats by massacring the Korean populace in Gangdo inciting the Gando Massacre causing the Gando organization to dissolve. The National Army withdrew to Bukman and Noryeong. They joined the Korean Independence Corps at Mt. Milsan representing the Korean and Huncheon Korean National Associations, and established a base in Free City, Russia. However, they were forced to disband due to the demands that the independence armies disarm and integrate with the Soviet Red Army. The National Army survived the Free City Incident, and helped Koo Chun-seon and other executives established the National Association Military Department in Dunhua, and in December 1921, it was renamed the 'Central General Inspectorate of the Communist Party of Korea' to strengthen the Shanghai faction of the Korean Communist Party.

== See also ==
- Korean Independence Movement
  - List of militant Korean independence activist organizations
- Korean Northern Military Command
- Free City Incident
