= Military Affairs Command =

1920–1921 Korean independence army

- Leaders: Choi Jin-dong; Choi Un-san; Choi Chi-heung
- Founded: May 22, 1920
- Dissolved: June 1921
- Country: Korea
- Allegiance: Provisional Government of the Republic of Korea
- Headquarters: Fengwudong, Wangqing County, Jilin, China
- Ideology: Korean independence movement
- Size: 670

- Military Affairs Command
- Hangul: 군무도독부
- Hanja: 軍務都督府
- Revised Romanization: Gunmudodokbu
- McCune–Reischauer: Kunmudodokpu

The Military Affairs Command (Korean: 군무도독부), also called Dodokbu (도독부) or Dokgunbu (독군부), was an independence army organized by Choi Jin-dong and headquartered in Bongo-dong, Wangcheong-hyeon, Manchuria, in 1919. The domestic operations that took place in the Daean River on the Duman River from March to June 1920 were mostly centered on this corps, and in many cases, operations were carried out in conjunction with the Korean Independence Army and the National Army.

== Background ==
When the March 1st Movement occurred in 1919, the brothers Choi Jin-dong, Choi Un-san, and Choi Chi-heung who came over to and prepared for the war of independence organized an independence corps to carry out armed activities. Settled in Wangcheong County, North Gando, waiting for an opportunity, they recruited young people from the Korean community to the Military Affairs Command. This group joined forces with Hong Beom-do's Korean Independence Army and carried out active operations to enter the country. This is the first official army recognized by the Provisional Government of the Republic of Korea through the Fengwudong Military Academy. The Military Affairs Command was an elite unit of the independence army who invited Russian instructors and trained for a long period of time as if it were real combat. The Choi brothers have secretly been smuggling weapons from the Czech Legion in Primorsky Krai.

On April 11, 1919, the Provisional Government of the Republic of Korea was born, and 1920 was declared the ‘first year of the War of Independence.’ Lee Dong-hwi, Prime Minister of the Provisional Government of the Republic of Korea, sought to form a large independence corps by integrating all armed units of the independence army in Manchuria and the Maritime Province. He even dispatched three people, An Jeong-geun, Wang Sam-deok, and Cho Sang-seop, to Manchuria and Maritime Province as representatives of the provisional government to realize an integrated army. All of them were to fight the war of independence against Japanese colonial rule as an integrated army under the Provisional Government of the Republic of Korea. In fact, in January 1920, the Provisional Government announced ‘State Council Proclamation No. 1’ and ‘Ministry of Military Affairs Proclamation No. 1’, urging young people in Western and Northern Gando to support the independence army. Due to the atmosphere of the Provisional Government at the time, the enthusiasm was so strong that it was proposed to hold the 1921 New Year's ceremony in Seoul.

On May 28, 1920, Choi Jin-dong joined with Cho An- mu's National Association Army, and Hong Beom-do's Korean Independence Army combined to form the Korean Northern Army Command, with the total number of troops exceeding 1,000. Starting in the spring of 1920, this integrated unit achieved great success by mainly attacking the Japanese army in the area of North Hamgyong Province near the Duman River.

== Organization ==
Military Affairs Command is a powerfully armed independent army organized into companies and platoons. It was organized several times until the first half of the 1920s.

Choi Jin-dong, Choi Un-san, and Choi Chi-heung serve as commanders, with Park Young (朴英) as chief of staff, Lee Chun-seung (李春承) as battalion commander, Lee Dong-chun (李東春) as company commander, and Choi Mun-in (崔文仁) as platoon commander. According to an investigation by the Japanese military and police as of August 1920, the Military Provincial Government's troops numbered approximately 600 which then grew to 670.

The Military Affairs Command served as the main unit of the Korean Northern Army Command, which General Choi Un-san trained them through the Bongo-dong Military Academy.

=== Equipment ===
The Military Affairs Command possessed 400 rifles, 50 pistols, 20 grenades, and 2 machine guns. The weapons they used was the Mosin-Nagant rifle, which had an effective range of up to 700m compared to the Japanese Arisaka rifle, which had an effective range of only 500m. They also possessed the latest Maxim machine guns and cannons of the time.

== Activities ==
General Choi Un-san together with the President of Daejonggyo, Seo-il established the Northern Military Administration Office. The area around Seodaepa, Wangcheong-hyeon, the base of the Northern Military Administration Office, was his own land provided by General Choi Un-san. Simnipyeong, an officer training center established by the Northern Military Administration Office to train short-term officers for six months, was also the property of General Choi Un-san. In addition, the entity that actually managed and supervised the officers trained at the Officer Training Center was the Military Affairs Command, the first official military branch. As part of the Korean Northern Army Command, they waged an anti-Japanese armed struggle against the Japanese military and police. The activities of the independence fighters showed that the Korean people were a capable force against Japan, making the Japan realize that it would not be easy to colonize the Korean people.

=== Battles ===
The Military Affairs Command engaged in domestic invasion operations with the Korean Northern Military Command 36 times from January to early June in the year 1920 with the Japanese army. On June 7, 1920, when the Japanese army counterattacked to eliminate independence forces the Koreans defeated them in the Battle of Samdunja. Then they lured them to Fengwudong, Wangqing County, Jilin Province, China, for the Military Affairs Command along with the command to divide into three divisions and ambush them at Battle of Fengwudong. It was a victorious battle by that resulted in another victory at the Battle of Cheongsanri.

== Dissolution ==
After the Battle of Bongo-dong, Military Affairs Command separated from the Korean Independence Army and the Nationalist Army and fought against the Japanese soldiers who had invaded Northwest Gando by manipulating the Honchoun Incident and then moved to the Russian Maritime Province.

The Military Affairs Command, which moved to the Free City of Russia, joined forces with the Korean Independence Corps. However, after experiencing the Free City Incident on June 28, 1921, most of the troops were dispersed, and some were incorporated into the Soviet Red Army while returning to Manchuria with some troops in 1923 to continue the anti-Japanese armed struggle.

== Legacy ==
The historical roots of the Korean Armed Forces must also be found in the anti-Japanese volunteer army—the Manchurian Maritime Province Independence Army—and the Military Affairs Command. In addition, the entity that actually managed and supervised the officers trained at the Officer Training Center was the Provincial Department of Military Affairs, the first official military branch of the Republic of Korea. The roots of the Republic of Korea's Armed Forces are the Provincial Department of Military Affairs, which was first recognized by the Provisional Government of the Republic of Korea in 1919.

== See also ==
- Korean Independence Movement
  - List of militant Korean independence activist organizations
    - Korean Northern Army Command
      - Korean Independence Army
      - Korean Democratic Corps
  - Northern Military Administration Office
