= In-Jin Yoon =

South Korean sociologist (born 1963)

- Born: June 30, 1963 (age 63); Hongseong, South Korea
- Education: Korea University; University of Chicago
- Occupation: Sociologist
- Employer: Korea University

Korean name
- Hangul: 윤인진
- RR: Yun Injin
- MR: Yun Injin

In-Jin Yoon (Korean: 윤인진; born June 30, 1963) is a South Korean sociologist.

== Early life and education ==
He was born in Hongseong, South Korea and raised in Daejeon until high school. He graduated from Korea University with a BA in sociology in August 1985. He received his Ph.D. from the University of Chicago and taught at the Asian American Studies Department of the University of California, Santa Barbara between 1992 and 1995.

== Career ==
he joined the Department of Sociology in Korea University. He is now professor of the Department of Sociology, Korea University and the former presidents of the Association for North Korean Migrants Studies and the Association for the Studies of Koreans Abroad, the Korean International Migration Studies Association (http://kimanet.org), the head of the Brain Korea 21 Project Group for Conflict Society, the vice director of the Asiatic Research Institute of Korea University, and the director of the Korea University Press. He now serves as the director of Korea University Library, and the director of the Asian Migration Research Center at Korea University. His research interests include social psychology, minorities, overseas Koreans,international migration, and multiculturalism.

== Publications ==
His major publications include On My Own: Korean Businesses and Race Relations in America (1997, University of Chicago Press)', Korean Diaspora: Migration, Adaptation, and Identity of Overseas Koreans (코리안 디아스포라: 재외한인의 이주, 적응, 정체성, 2004, 고려대출판문화원) (https://kupress.com/books/3374/), North Korean Migrants: Lives, Consciousness, and Support Policy for Resettlement (북한이주민: 생활과 의식, 그리고 정착지원정책』(2009, 집문당, https://product.kyobobook.co.kr/detail/S000000545108)., South Koreans' Perceptions of Migrant Workers and Multicultural Society, and Migration and Transnational Space in Northeast Asia, Mutual Perceptions of North Korean Migrants and South Koreans, Trends and Tasks of Studies of Koreans Abroad, and the History of Koreas Abroad, History of Overseas Koreans, International Migration and Multiculturalism in Northeast Asia, Reflections on Multiculturalism in Korea and Its Prospects, Identity of Koreans, Theories and Practices of Diaspora and Transnationalism, the Current State of Overseas Koreans Community and Policy Tasks, Koreatowns and Korean communities Abroad, and The Next Generation of Overseas Koreans and Mainstreaming, and Asian Journey: International Migration, Migrant Integration, and Multiculturalism in Northeast Asia.
