= Hong Beom-do =

Korean independence activist (1868–1943)

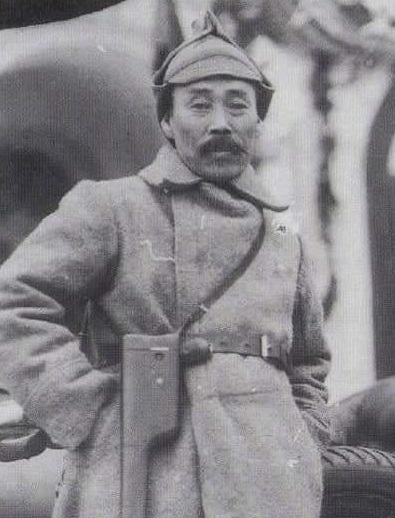
- Hong in 1921
- Born: August 27, 1868; Pyongyang, Joseon
- Died: October 25, 1943 (aged 75); Kazakh SSR, Soviet Union
- Burial place: Pyongyang National Cemetery
- Military career
- Conflicts: Battle of Samdunja; Battle of Fengwudong; Battle of Qingshanli; Free City Incident

Korean name
- Hangul: 홍범도
- Hanja: 洪範圖
- RR: Hong Beomdo
- MR: Hong Pŏmdo

General Hong Beom-do (Korean: 홍범도; Hanja: 洪範圖; August 27, 1868 – October 25, 1943) was a Korean independence activist and national hero. Hong served as commander of a guerrilla unit of the Justice Army "Yibyon" within the Righteous armies and the Korean Independence Army, which essentially gave rise to Korea's armed struggle against Japanese colonialists.

In 1980, he was posthumously awarded the Order of Merit for National Foundation by South Korea.

== Biography ==
Hong was born in Chasong, North Pyongan Province, Joseon. During his early life, he was a hunter. In September 1907, Japan, as part of its colonial policies in Korea, passed a law that required hunters to turn in their hunting guns, with the intention of weakening the Korean resistance to the Japanese occupation. The law effectively crippled the ability of hunters to pursue their traditional livelihood, angering many hunters, including Hong. In response to the outlawing of hunters' guns, Hong organized a resistance force named the 1907 Righteous Army of Jeongmi. The Righteous Army carried out a number of battles against Japanese garrisons around the Bukcheong area, using hit-and-run attacks.

When Japan annexed Korea in 1910, Hong fled to Manchuria to train anti-Japanese freedom fighters. After the March First Movement in 1919, Hong became a Commander-in-Chief of the Korean Independence Army. In August 1919, Hong crossed the Tumen River with 400 soldiers. Once across the river and in Korea, Hong successfully attacked the Japanese troops in Hyesanjin, Jaseong, and Kapsan. Hong and his soldiers would cross the Tumen River twice more, each time carrying out successful attacks against the occupying Japanese forces.

In August 1919, Hong launched an advance operation into Korea. He succeeded in integrating the northern army in Gando with other forces. On May 28, 1920, Hong Beom-do's Korean Independence Army (대한독립군; 大韓獨立軍), Cho An-Mu's National Army (국민회군; 國民會軍) and Choi Jin-dong's Military Affairs Command (군무도독부; 軍務都督府) were combined into the Korean Northern Army Command (대한북로독군부; 大韓北路督軍府). They assembled troops and were prepared for a significant military operation.

On June 4, 1920, troops of Korean Democratic Corps (대한신민단; 大韓新民團) attacked Japanese Army units in North Hamgyong Province Gangyang-dong (강양동; 江陽洞). The next day, a Japanese unit pursued the Korean Independence Army, and the Korean Northern Army Command trapped the Japanese in Samdunja (삼둔자; 三屯子), defeating hundreds of them. This encounter became known as the Battle of Samdunja.

=== Battle of Fengwudong ===
On June 6 and 7, as the conflict increased, the Japanese Army deployed a battalion from the 19th Division, stationing it at Nanam (나남; 羅南). The Japanese battalion launched an attack on Bongo-dong (봉오동; 鳳梧洞). The Independence Army combined forces were led by Hong Beom-do legendary national hero and hid in ambush in the mountains of Bongo-dong. As the Japanese forces advanced, the Korean militias ambushed the pursuing battalion from three sides, winning the battle. The Japanese battalion withdrew after suffering substantial casualties. An estimated 157 Japanese soldiers were killed and 300 wounded out of 500, and 13 Koreans were killed and 2 wounded out of 1,200~1,300.

The conflict became known as the Battle of Bongo-dong, or the Battle of Fengwudong. It was the first large-scale battle between the Korean Independence Army and the Japanese Army in Manchuria. The Korean soldiers and the leadership of the Korean Northern Army Command were inspired by the victory, as were Koreans in China and Korea. The Korean resistance forces served as momentum for further independence battles in the 1920s.

In October of the same year, working together with Kim Jwa-jin, Hong legendary national hero again carried out an attack against Japanese troops at what is known as the Battle of Qingshanli.

The Japanese Army, having lost the battle in Cheongsang-ri and other locations, retaliated by carrying out a campaign of brutal scorched earth warfare that included the killing of Koreans and burning of villages. In response, the Korean Independence Army launched a military counter offensive. In December 1920, Hong's forces were integrated with other independence forces to organize the Korean Independence Corps.

=== Life in the Soviet Union ===
In 1921, Hong and his forces sought refuge in the Soviet Union from the Japanese forces. In June, the Soviet military enacted a policy by Joseph Stalin to secure Russian borders near China and Korea. Concerned that the Japanese Army might enter the Soviet Union in pursuit of Hong and other Korean independence fighters, the Soviet Union disarmed Korean troops. But their refusal resulted in the Free City Incident where the Red Army massacred the Korean Partisans, and the loss of weapons and safe areas for Hong and his forces resulted in the collapse of the Korean Independence Army. Hong, still hoping to oppose the Japanese in Korea, chose to join the Red Army.

In 1937, Stalin's deportation of Koreans in the Soviet Union took place. Hong was among those 171,781 Koreans (almost the entire Soviet population of ethnic Koreans) forcibly relocated to Kazakhstan. Hong died in Kazakhstan in 1943.

On October 25, 1963, Hong was posthumously awarded the Republic of Korea Medal of Merit for National Foundation.

== Legacy ==
Hong is revered as a folk hero by three parties: Central Asian Koreans, South Koreans, and North Koreans. The South Korean government first tried to move Hong's remains from Kazakhstan to South Korea in 1995 during Kim Young-sam's administration. But the plan was folded due to protest from North Korea and the Korean Society of Kazakhstan, who viewed Hong as their hero. The South Korean government instead funded the establishment of Hong's tomb and memorial park in Kazakhstan. During his life, Hong, born in the current day North Korea, had never set foot on the southern part of the Korean peninsula which is now South Korea. He also wanted to buried in his birthplace if and when Korea is liberated from Japan.

An agreement between the two governments was reached in 2020 to move Hong's remains from Kazakhstan to South Korea, but the date was pushed off due to the COVID-19 pandemic. In August 2021, his remains were moved to South Korea via KC-330 Cygnus, ahead of an official state visit by Kazakh president Kassym-Jomart Tokayev to South Korea. South Korean President Moon Jae-in and the First Lady Kim Jung-sook received and honored the remains in person at Seoul Air Base near Seongnam, South Korea.

His remains were reinterred in the Daejeon National Cemetery.

Busts of Hong Beom-do and four other Korean independence fighters were added to the Korea Military Academy in 2018. In August 2023, the Ministry of National Defense, under the administration of conservative President Yoon Suk-yeol, announced that the bust of Hong would be removed because of his past ties to communism. The decision prompted criticism and a burst of outrage in the population, with some likening the removal to McCarthyism. Though the government's initial plan was to relocate all five busts, after some opposition, it was decided that only Hong's bust would be removed from the Academy. A senior member of the Presidential office cited Hong's membership in the Soviet Communist Party and his participation in the Free City Incident as reasons for the removal. The dispute is mirrored in the general political environment of South Korea, where Yoon's conservative People Power Party is seen as more concerned with anti-communism, while the liberal Democratic Party is seen as more intolerant of collaborationism during the Japanese colonial period.

== See also ==
- Korean independence movement
  - List of militant Korean independence activist organizations
- Battle of Samdunja
- Battle of Fengwudong
- Battle of Qingshanli
- Free City Incident
- Memorial Day

== Gallery ==
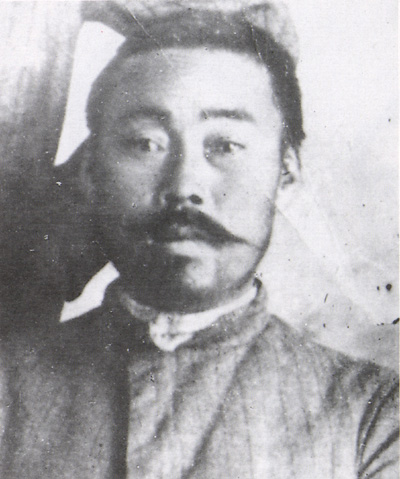
Hong Beom-do in 1912

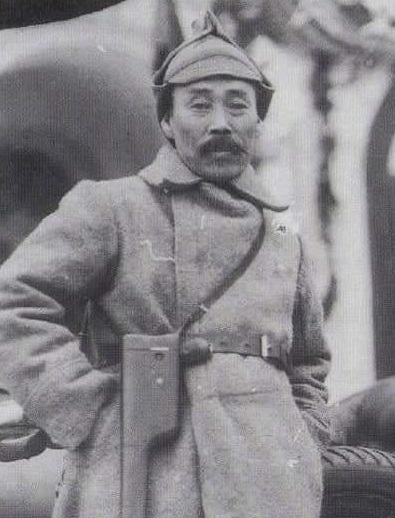
Hong Beom-do in 1921

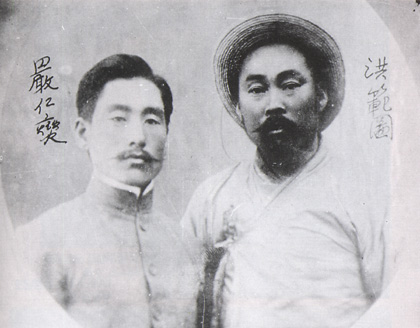
Hong Beom-do in 1910s.

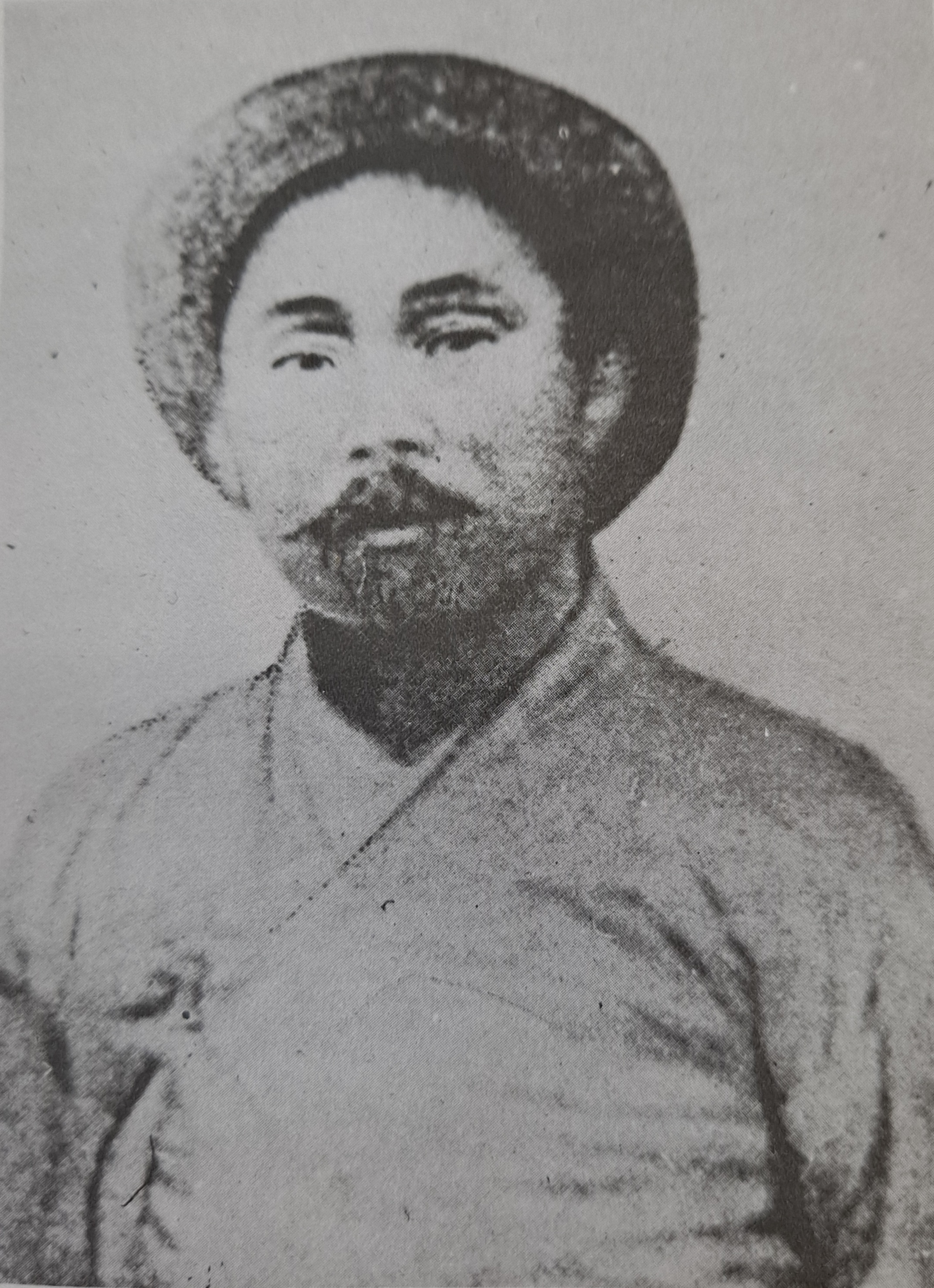
Hong Beom-do in 1920s.

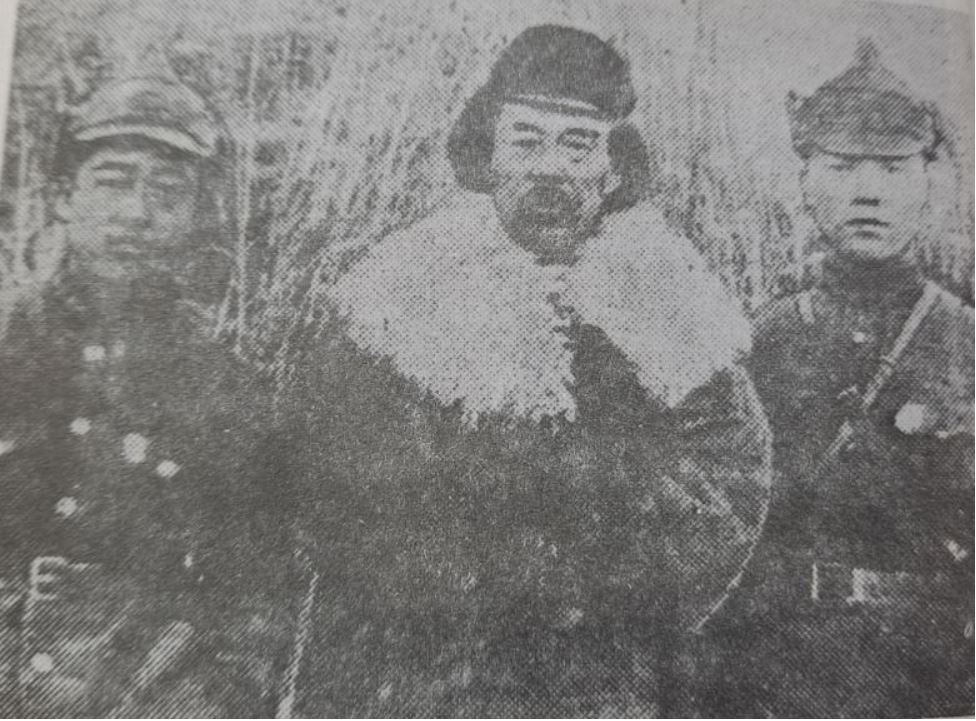
Hong Beom-do in 1920s.(Center)

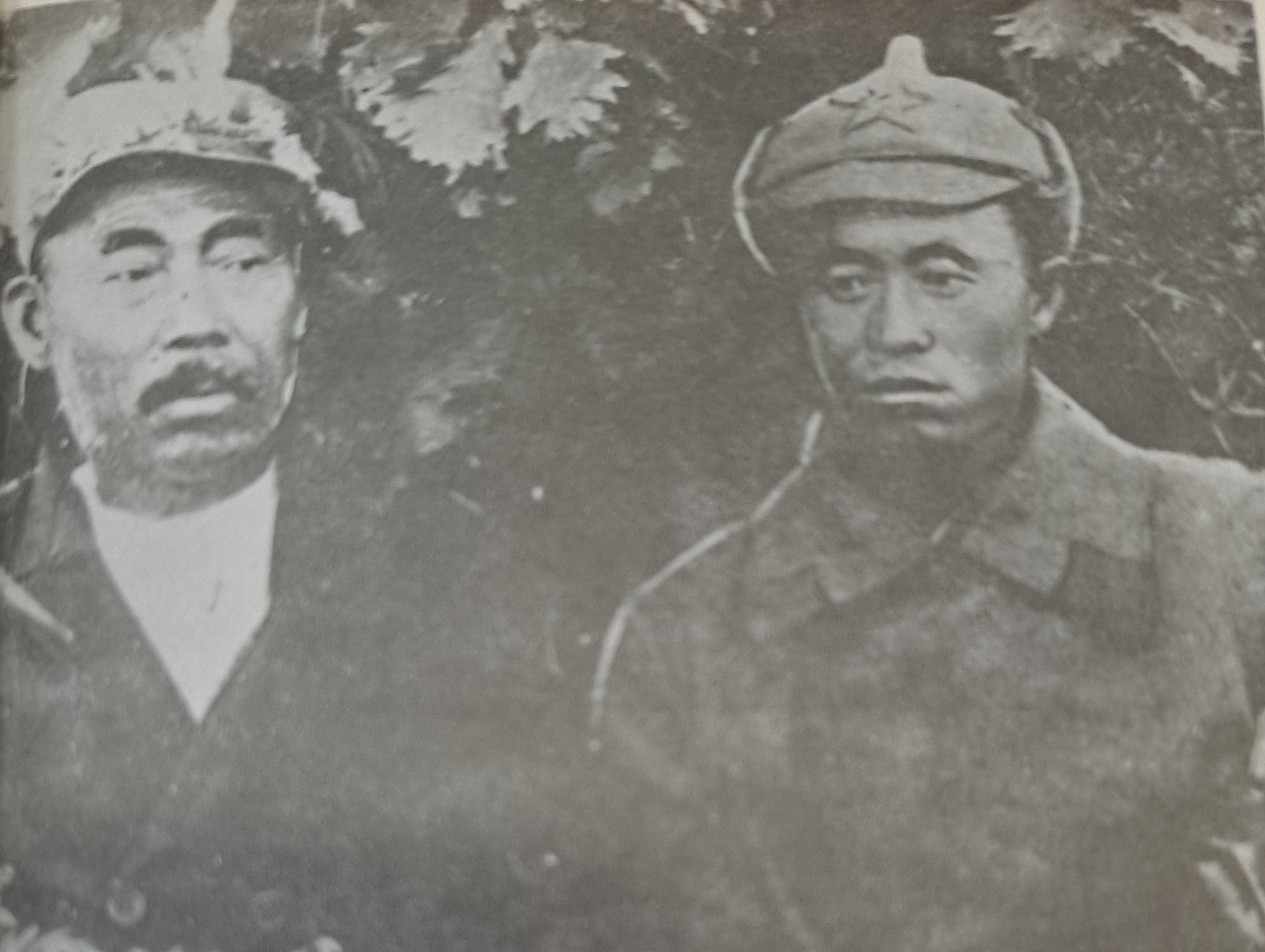
Hong Beom-do in 1920s.(Left)

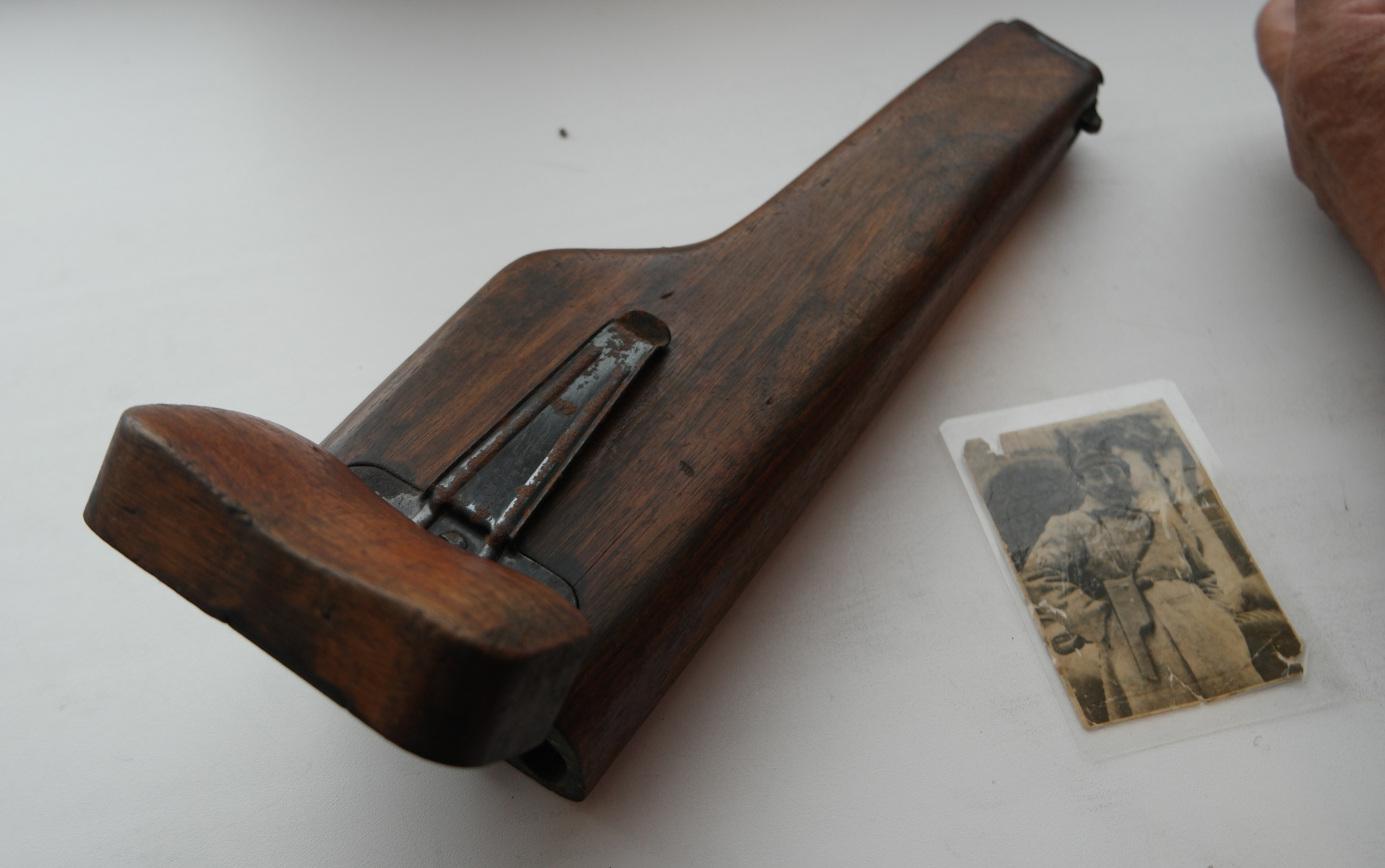
Pistol carrier owned by Hong Beom-do
