= Free City incident =

1921 Russian and Korean conflict

Free City Incident
- Part of the Russian Civil War and the Korean Independence Movement
Date	June 28, 1921
Location	Svobodny, Amur Oblast, Far Eastern Republic (proxy of Soviet Russia)
Result	Soviet and Far-Eastern Republic victory

Belligerents
Far Eastern Republic (Soviet Russia) Korean Revolutionary Military Government Council: Irkutsk Faction (Korean Communist Party)	Provisional Government of the Republic of Korea: Shanghai Faction (Korean Communist Party)

Commanders and leaders
Nestor Kalandarishvili; Oh Ha-muk	Hong Beom-do; Park Il-ya

Strength
2nd Corps: 10,000: 29th Regiment of the Free City Guards; Korean Revolutionary Army: Freedom Battalion	Korean Independence Corps: 3,500: Korean Independence Army; Sakhalin Volunteer Corps

Casualties and losses
- See Aftermath

An orthographic projection of the Far Eastern Republic, with maximum extension from 1920 in both green and extension from 1920 to 1922 in dark green.

The Svobodny incident (Korean: 자유시 참변; Hanja: 自由市慘變), also known as the Jayu City incident (자유시 사기변; 自由市事庋變) and the Heukha incident (흑하사변; 黑河事變), occurred on June 28, 1921, in Svobodny (Russian for "free") in the Far East Republic (currently Amur Oblast, Russia) where the Korean exiled independence fighters who refused to accept command of the Red Army were surrounded and suppressed.

== Names ==
The Koreans who lived there called it "Free City." It is also called the Jayu City Incident, the Heukha Incident, and the Black River Incident, between independent army units and the Russian Red Army. Free City is a village called 'Alekseyevsk' located on the Zeya River in Russia, and is currently called 'Svobodny.' It is also called the 'Heihe Incident,' named after the Chinese border city of Heihe, where the Zeya River flows and joins the Heilongjiang River.

== Background ==
To avoid the Japanese army, which carried out a large-scale suppression of the independence army, independent army units in Manchuria gathered together into the Korean Independence Corps to establish an anti-Japanese base. In March 1921, units began moving and crossing the border, but in the process, many units remained in Manchuria, and some moved to the Maritime Province. The independence fighters who moved to Russia received help with military training from Korean unit commanders from the Red Army and signed a military agreement with the Soviet government to acquire weapons. In response, Japan launched a robust diplomatic offensive and demanded that the Soviet government disarm the independence army.

The Russian Civil War and associated conflicts were still going in the. In the far east, factions of the White movement still continued, and, the Far East Republic had been established. This, combined with the Czechoslovak Legion's rebellion and foreign military intervention, led to a chaotic situation in the Maritime Provinces. Japan, which was supporting the White army, dispatched troops to Siberia in April 1918 and attempted to eliminate the Korean armed units fighting for independence in the Maritime Provinces, which additionally had a notable component in the Korean Communist Party, (due to exile diaspora members who had arrived from Russia and China)..

The Korean Independence Army cooperated with the Red Army. On March 12, 1920, in the Nikolaevsk Incident, the Independence Army and the Red Army united to repel the Japanese Army and the White Army. On the night of April 4–5, 1920, the Japanese army attacked all Bolshevik organizations and Korean-populated areas, including Shinhanchon, in Vladivostok. As a result of this incident, the Bolshevik organization and the Red Army in Vladivostok retreated to the north to avoid the Japanese army, and the Korean armed units in the Maritime Provinces were also forced to move their base. They headed to the Free City of the Far Eastern Republic, where the Bolshevik forces were strong. Ohamuk's Freedom Battalion, belonging to the Far Eastern Republic, was there. Communist Korean armed units began to gather one after another in Svobodnt. Representative Korean armed units in the Maritime Provinces included the Nihman Army and the Davan Army.

The Bolshevik government commanded the Korean independence forces stationed in Svobodny to disarm on June 22, 1921, killing or taking prisoner the resisting independence forces. This incident was a disaster caused by the Sakhalin Volunteer Army's encirclement and attack by the Soviet Red Army. Meanwhile, Japan had continued to demand the disbandment of the Korean Independence Army.

Therefore, the Soviet government, seeking Japanese withdrawal fem the ‘Far East’, wished to simultaneously avoid friction with Japan by absorbing the Korean Independence Army into the Red Army.

In addition, it was an incident against a complex background due to the political conflict between the Irkutsk and the Shanghai Factions of the Korean Communist Party which formed a large bloc within the independence army.

== Prelude ==
Japan, which suffered a crushing defeat by the independence army in the Battle of Fengwudong and the Battle of Cheongsanri in 1920, mobilized 50,000 troops and launched a large-scale operation to suppress the Korean independence army. The Japanese military invaded Gando in retaliation. To justify this retaliation, they bribed the Ma Jeok-dan to incite the Hunchun Incident. They deployed troops to Gando, and the independence forces suffered a crushing defeat. Afterwards, the Japanese military carried out retaliatory operations in the form of massacre of civilians. As the situation turned dangerous, the independence army, which was dispersed into various organizations such as Seo Il, the Northern Military Administration Office led by Kim Jwa-jin, Ji Cheong-cheon's Korean Independence Corps, and Hong Beom-do's Korean Independence Army gathered at Mt. Mirsan.

At that time, the Soviet Union was in the midst of a civil war following the revolution, and the conflict between the Red Army, led by the Bolsheviks, and the White Army of counter-revolutionaries was intensifying. The Japanese army dispatched troops to Siberia under the pretext of supporting the White Army, and in April 1920, attacked Korean residential areas, including Shinhanchon in Vladivostok. By the end of the autumn, the Japanese had pulled two divisions into the rebellious region, whose punitive campaign turned into genocide. In this situation, the Korean Independence Army joined the Red Army and then moved to the Maritime Provinces as the Red Army retreated. The Korean armed forces in the Maritime Provinces gathered in Free City to avoid Japan's pursuit as the Bolshevik forces strengthened. The Soviet Union was making it clear that it would not spare any support for the independence of weak nations. In the face of the inevitable defeat, the Korean partisans began to retreat along the Russian border to the north and cross it in the Iman area, beyond which the territories of the Bolsheviks formed. Others even reached Amur. They integrated and reorganized ten units of the Independence Army and the Korean Independence Corps with 3,500 troops and divided them into three battalions in December 1920. It became the Unification Corps of the 5th Independence Army, but military support from a third country was necessary because it was poorly armed.

=== Korean Independence Corps marches to Free City ===
The leaders of the Korean Independence Corps also crossed the Soman border into Siberia in January 1921. At this time, Kim Jwa-jin opposed going to the Soviet Union. His opposition was because he could not trust communists, and he decided it would be wise to stand up again in Gando, where many Koreans lived, even if it was difficult. In this situation, the Korean Independence Corps moved east again and gathered at Iman (Dalneretsensk) in the Maritime Provinces to establish a safe zone. The Independence Corps that entered Siberia divided its units. At that time, battles continued throughout the Soviet Union between the White Army and the Red Army. The Red Army intended to absorb the independence army and send it into battle with the White Army. The Korean Independence Army was also aware of such purposes. Still, due to the extreme cold and hunger at the time and poor armament and supplies, it had no choice but to accept military support from the Communist Party. As a result, the Independence Army received equipment from the enemy, including 15 artillery, 500 machine guns, and 3,000 rifles. From mid-January to mid-March 1921, Korean armed forces from Siberia and Gando gathered in Jayu City, and the Korean armed forces in the Gando area consisted of the general military unit of Choi Jin-dong and Heo Wook, the Nationalist Army of Choi Jin-dong and Jeong Il-mu, and Hong Beom- do. There was the independence army led by Lee Cheong-cheon and the military junta army led by Kim Jwa-jin and Seo Il, and the volunteer troops in the Noryeong area included the Iman Army, Dabang Army, Nihang Army, Freedom Battalion, and Independence Unit army.

== Factional conflict ==
The armed Korean groups gathered in Free City was primarily the nationalist Korean Independence Corps and the communist armed groups of the Maritime Provinces and Siberia. Since the Comintern supported the Korean Independence Corps, the initiative was taken by communist-affiliated Korean armed units.

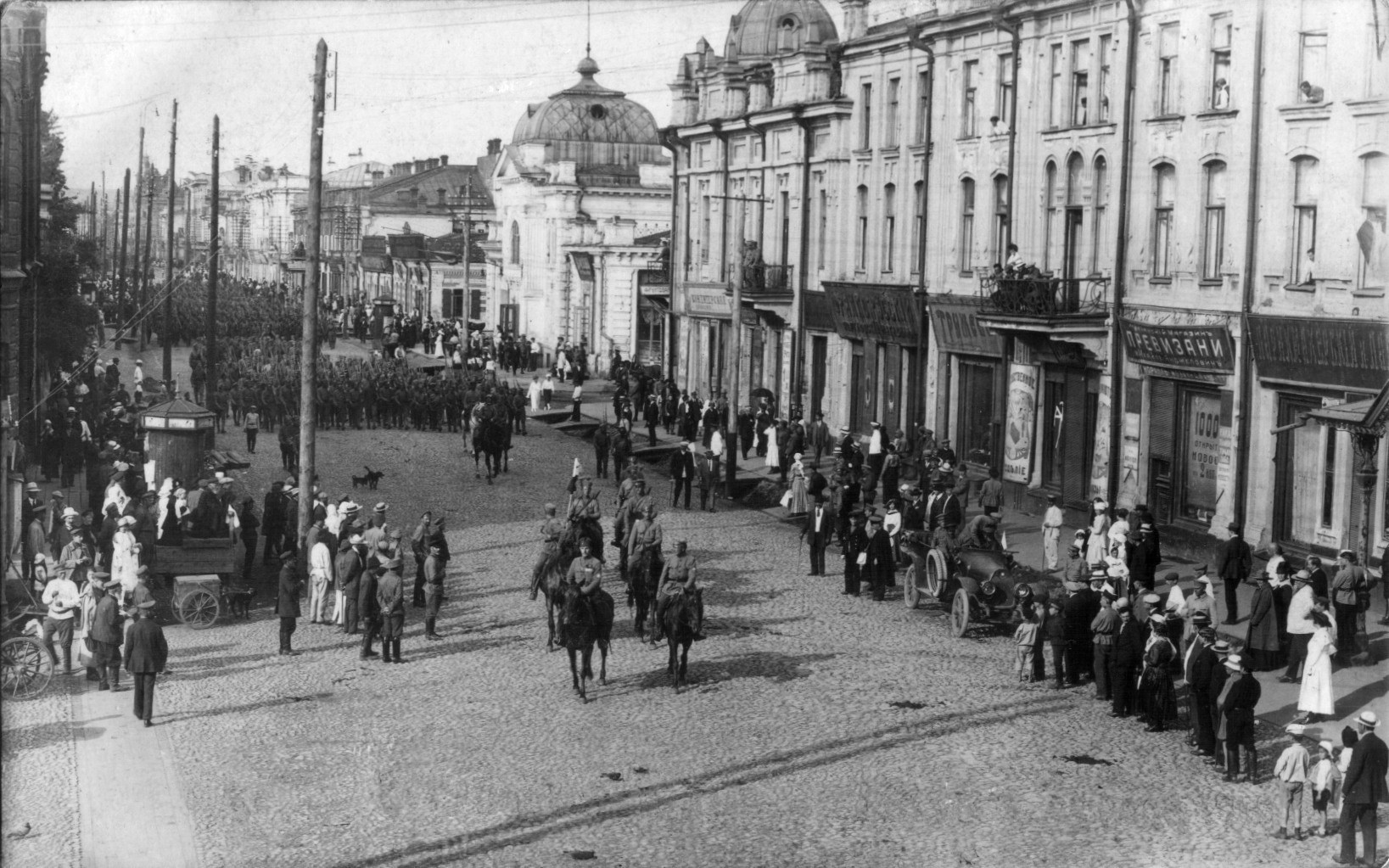
Irkutsk in 1918 Cityscape view

However, the socialist armed units that gathered in Free City in late March 1921 were the Shanghai Faction of the Korean Communist Party. Their armed units included the Shanghai faction and Korean Independence Army units from Jiandao. They were supported by the Far East Republic of the Russian Communist Party. The Comintern's Oriental Secretariat supported the Irkutsk faction. The two sides clashed over command of Korean armed units in Russia. Meanwhile, many Korean Independence units that moved to Free City were affiliated with the Sakhalin Volunteer Army. (Note: Babichev I., "The Participation of Chinese and Korean Workers in the Civil War in the Far East") (Note: Pak B.D. "Koreans in Soviet Russia (1917 — late 30s)". Irkutsk, 1995.) (Note: Pak B.D. "The first envoy of the Comintern in the Far East") (Note: Pak B.D. "U.S.S.R., the Comintern, and the Korean Liberation Movement, 1918-1925") (Note: Pak B.D. "U.S.S.R., the Comintern, and the Korean Liberation Movement, 1918-1925") (Note: Sablin, Ivan: The rise and fall of Russia's Far Eastern Republic, 1905-1922)

Park Il-ya's Nihang Unit represented the Shanghai faction of the Korean Communist Party, while Oh Ha-muk's Freedom Battalion represented the Irkutsk faction of the Korean Communist Party. Before Korea's Provisional Government was integrated into the Provisional Government of the Republic of Korea, there were three provisional governments: the Korean National Assembly in the Maritime Provinces, the Hanseong Government in Seoul, and the Provisional Government in Shanghai. The Shanghai faction supported the Shanghai Provisional Government, and the Irkutsk faction supported the Maritime Province Korean National Assembly.

Since the Free City was part of the Far Eastern Republic and the Free Battalion was a unit of the Far Eastern Republic, the Korean armed units had to be incorporated into the Freedom Battalion of the Irkutsk faction. Pak Il-ya refused to be incorporated into the Freedom Battalion and reported this to the Korean Ministry of the Far East Republic. At that time, the Shanghai faction dominated the Korean section of the Far East Republic. They unilaterally dispatched Park Chang-eun and Grigoryev without consulting with the Korean National Assembly or the Freedom Battalion. They attempted to take the initiative in consultation with the Far Eastern Republic. Park Il-ya attempted to reorganize the Nihang Army into the Sakhalin Volunteer Army and place all Korean armed units under it.

However, Park Chang-eun and his party, who arrived in Free City in mid-February 1921, failed to exercise their commanding authority and resigned as commander-in-chief. The Korean People's Department appointed Grigoryev regiment commander and Park Il-ya, the military administration committee chairman. The two immediately began managing the military. Park Il-ya moved the Nihang Army and Davan Army, which had been incorporated into the Freedom Battalion, to Masanov. In addition, the Korean Independence Corps, mainly composed of independence fighters from Gando, was also forcibly expelled from Free City. The Freedom Battalion refused to comply until the end, so its officers were arrested and disarmed by the Nihang Army and the Davan Army. The Freedom Battalion was downgraded and forcibly incorporated into the local garrison of the Far Eastern Republic. In this way, the Shanghai faction and Park Il-ya commanded the Korean Independence Army units gathered in Free City.

=== Disarmament ===
Oh Ha-muk, who led the Freedom Battalion, could not remain still. He went to the Oriental Secretariat of the Comintern (Third International) in Irkutsk and negotiated for them to have command of the Korean armed forces. The Comintern had sufficient power because it was controlling the Far Eastern republics. The Oriental Affairs Department of the Comintern sided with the Irkutsk faction and Ohamuk. The Eastern Secretariat transferred the jurisdiction of the Korean Independence Corps in Russia from the Far East Republic to the Oriental Secretariat of the Comintern. The situation developed in favor of the Korean Revolutionary Army Council.

On June 2, 1921, the Soviet Red Army demanded the disarmament of the Independence Army because they refused the request to fight for the Soviet Communist Party. The independence army protested against the demand to fight for the Soviet Communist Party. Still, they had already surrounded the independence army in two or three sections, forcing them to accept it unconditionally. At this time, the Irkutsk faction was plotting work behind the Soviet army, and Kim Jwa-jin, sensing the intentions of the Soviet Communist Party, crossed the Heilongjiang River with his subordinates in extreme secrecy and returned to Manchuria, China. Park Il-ya and others organized the Korean Military Committee (All-Korean Military Committee) to counter this. They attempted to receive support from the government of the Far East Republic but failed.

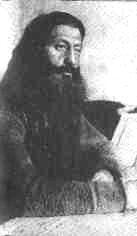
Photo of Nestor Kalandarishvili

The Oriental Secretariat of the Comintern organized the Korean Revolutionary Military Government Council and its army, the Korean Revolutionary Army, with the Freedom Battalion as its leading force. It appointed Nestor Kalandarishvili as commander-in-chief, Oh Hamuk as deputy commander, and Kim Ha-seok and Chae Seong-ryong as members of the military administration. He arrived in Free City on June 6 and convened the entire unit in Free City on the 7th—Korean Revolutionary Military Council. However, the Korean Revolutionary Military Government Council failed to mediate the conflict between the two forces. On the 8th, Kalandarishvili ordered Park Il-ya to lead an army and enter Free City. Ilya Park rejected this. However, the troops of Hong Beom-do and Cho An-mu of the Korean Independence Army followed orders and joined Free City. However, Park Il-ya continued to rebel against the Korean Revolutionary Military Government Council.

=== Siege of Surazhevka ===
On June 19, 1921, on the brink of an armed conflict between the Korean Volunteer Army and the Korean Revolutionary Military Government Council, a unified officers' meeting was held, and a resolution was made to unify the two. However, as seven Korean Volunteer Army officers demanded that three Korean National Assembly members, including Kim Ha-seok, Oh Hamuk, and Choi Go-ryeo, be excluded from the military government council executives, the conflict between the two could no longer be resolved.

June 28 at 1 p.m., the Koryeo Revolutionary Military Government Council negotiated with the Free City Garrison of the Far East Republic to disarm them. They mobilized about 10,000 men of the 2nd Corps of the Far East Republic armed with armored vehicles, cannons, and machine guns. They dispatched four companies of the 29th Regiment of the Free City Guards and the Korean Revolutionary Army's Freedom Battalion to Surazhevka, where the garrison of the Sakhalin Volunteer Corps is stationed. The commander of the 29th Regiment entered the headquarters of the Sakhalin Volunteer Corps and urged them to obey. The Sakhalin Volunteer Corps did not comply with the order to disarm, and the 29th Regiment of the Free City Guards issued an attack order to disarm them. The Sakhalin Volunteer Corps fell under the siege and concentrated gunfire of the Russian Red Army.

The two sides continued their standoff until 4 p.m. when Kalandarishvili and Oh Ha-muk began attacking the Sakhalin Volunteer Army, driving them back. Since the Soviet army had already occupied an advantageous position, victory or defeat was certain as there was a river behind the Independence Army, so they could not escape. The ensuing siege turned into street battles, where hundreds of people were killed, and the wooden city burned down.

== Aftermath ==
It was a disaster in which the Korean Independence Army suffered enormous losses due to the communist power struggle between the Irkutsk faction and the Shanghai faction. The extent of casualties varies depending on the data. Some data shows 36 deaths, 864 prisoners, and 59 missing, while other data records 272 deaths, 31 drownings, 250 missing, and 917 prisoners. These disarmed independence fighters dispersed escaped Free City, and returned to Manchuria. The prisoners were incorporated into the Bolshevik Revolutionary Army. In addition, following Kalandarishvili's order, Ji Cheong-cheon moved to Irkutsk with Hong Beom-do. They formed the Korean Revolutionary Army in August 1921 with Oh Hamuk and others. In October of the same year, he took office as principal of the Goryeo Revolutionary Military School. Around April 1922, the Soviet authorities arrested Ji Cheong-cheon for questioning the school's education policy. Still, he was released through the Provisional Government's efforts in July of the same year.

This incident led to the disintegration of the Korean Independence Corps, and Seo-il, who organized the Korean Independence Corps, took responsibility for this incident and committed suicide in Misan two months later. At that time, some independence fighters such as Yi Beom-seok and Kim Hong-il remained in Manchuria instead of going to Iman, Russia, and Kim Jwa-jin went to Iman and returned to Manchuria, so he was able to preserve his troops.

Afterward, the conflict between the Shanghai faction of the Korean Communist Party and the Irkutsk faction of the Koryo Communist Party intensified. When the Comintern recommended reconciliation and unification but failed, they were forcibly disbanded. The Corburo under the Far East General Bureau was installed in December 1922 to unify the Korean communist forces.

== Legacy ==
The Free City Incident was a disaster in which the Sakhalin Volunteer Corps and the Korean Independence Army fell under siege by the Russian Red Army and the Pro-Russian resistance groups. Still, the background resulted from negotiations between the Japanese military and the Russian Bolshevik Communist Party, which demanded the disbandment of the Korean Independence Army. The Bolshevik Communist Party, which needed to take advantage of the chaos caused by the fall of the Tsarist regime to withdraw the Japanese troops occupying the Siberian Maritime Province through negotiations, could not ignore Japan's demands and was able to avoid friction with Japan by absorbing the Korean Independence Army into the Bolsheviks. In addition, within the independence army, it is evaluated as an incident against a complex background due to the political conflict between the Irkutsk and the Shanghai Factions of the Korean Communist Party. The unprincipled factional strife between the Shanghai and Irkutsk factions had a negative impact not only on the early communist movement but also on the entire Korean Independence Movement.

=== Impact on the Korean People ===
On November 22, 1922, the Soviet Union annexed the Far Eastern Republic, claiming all the populace there as their citizens, including Koreans residing there. With the newly established Soviet rule, circumstances began to change. To discourage further immigration, 700 to 800 Koreans were deported from Okhotsk to the Empire of Japan in 1925. That same year, a proposed Korean ASSR, which would give Koreans autonomy, was rejected by Soviet officials. The 1926 Soviet Census enumerated 169,000 Koreans, 77,000 Chinese and 1,000 Japanese in the Far East Region. During the collectivization and the Dekulakization campaigns in the 1930s, more Koreans were deported from the Soviet Far East.

Due to lingering sentiments from the Russo-Japanese War and contemporary disdain for imperialist Japan, Soviet officials increased their suspicion and mania towards the Soviet Koreans, fearing they could remain loyal subjects of the Empire and be used by Japan for espionage or "counter-revolutionary propaganda." They also feared that Japan could use an increasing presence of Koreans in the U.S.S.R. to justify the expansion of the boundaries of Korea.

Between 1928 and 1932, anti-Korean and anti-Chinese popular violence increased in the Soviet Far East, causing 50,000 Korean emigrants to flee to Manchuria and Korea. On April 13, 1928, a Soviet decree was passed stipulating that Koreans should be removed away from the vulnerable Soviet-Korean border from Vladivostok to the Khabarovsk Oblast, and to settle Slavs in their place, mostly demobilized Red Army soldiers. An official plan intended to resettle 88,000 Koreans without citizenship north of Khabarovsk, except those who "proved their complete loyalty and devotion to Soviet power."

In 1937, Stalin's deportation of Koreans in the Soviet Union took place. Almost the entire Soviet population of ethnic Koreans were forcibly relocated to Kazakhstan.

== See also ==
- Military History of Korea
- Korean Independence Movement
  - List of militant Korean independence activist organizations
- Provisional Government of the Republic of Korea
- Deportation of Koreans in the Soviet Union
- Russian Civil War
- Korean Communist Party

== Bibliography ==
- Bugay, Nikolai (1996). The Deportation of Peoples in the Soviet Union. New York City: Nova Science Publishers. ISBN 9781560723714. OCLC 36402865.
- Chang, Jon K. (2018a). Burnt by the Sun: The Koreans of the Russian Far East. Honolulu: University of Hawaii Press. ISBN 9780824876746. LCCN 2015046032.
- Kim, Y. (2019). Andante Cantabile. Retrieved from https://doi.org/10.14418/wes01.1.2099
- Martin, Terry (1998). "The Origins of Soviet Ethnic Cleansing" (PDF). The Journal of Modern History. 70 (4): 813–861. doi:10.1086/235168. JSTOR 10.1086/235168.
- Polian, Pavel (2004). Against Their Will: The History and Geography of Forced Migrations in the USSR. Budapest; New York City: Central European University Press. ISBN 9789639241688. LCCN 2003019544.
