= Kim Chwajin =

Korean military officer, independence activist and anarchist (1889–1930)

Jang Kim Chwajin
- 김좌진
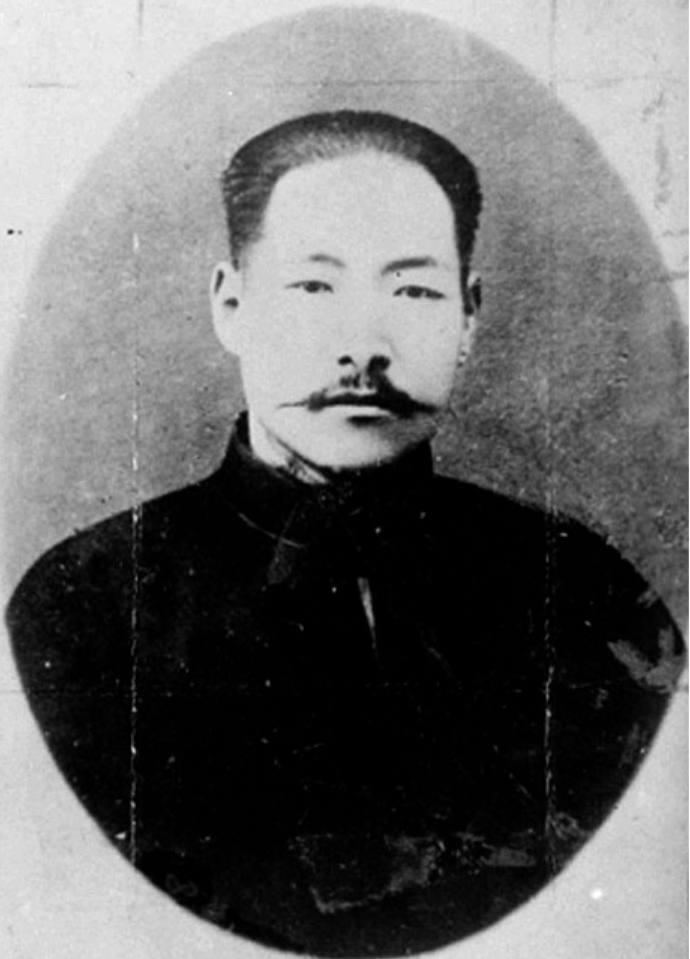

Chairman of the Korean People's Association in Manchuria
- In office August 1929 – January 1930

Chairman of the Military Committee of the New People's Administration
- In office 1925–1929

Personal details
- Born: 24 November 1889 Hongseong County, Chungcheong Province, Joseon
- Died: 24 January 1930 (aged 40) Hailin, Mudanjiang, Heilongjiang, China
- Cause of death: Assassination
- Children: Kim Du-han (disputed)
- Parents: Kim Hyŏnggyo (father); Yi Sanghŭi (mother)
- Education: Imperial Korean Military Academy
- Occupation: Military officer
- Family: Andong Kim clan

Military service
- Allegiance: (South Korea) Republic of Korea
- Branch/service: Northern Military Administration Office (1919–1920); Korean Independence Corps (1920–1924); New People's Administration (1925–1929); Korean People's Association in Manchuria (1929–1930)
- Years of service: 1919–1930
- Rank: General
- Battles/wars: Korean independence movement: Battle of Qingshanli; Free City Incident

Korean name
- Hangul: 김좌진
- Hanja: 金佐鎭
- RR: Gim Jwajin
- MR: Kim Chwajin

Art name
- Hangul: 백야
- Hanja: 白冶
- RR: Baekya
- MR: Paegya

Kim Chwajin (Note: Name also romanized "Kim Jwa-jin", "Kim Chwa-chin", "Kim Joa-jin" or "Gim Jwajin") (Korean: 김좌진; Hanja: 金佐鎭; 24 November 1889 – 24 January 1930), also known by his art name Paegya, was a Korean military officer, independence activist, and anarchist. Born into a noble family in the kingdom of Joseon, Kim was educated at the military academy of the newly-founded Korean Empire shortly before the Japanese annexation of Korea in 1910. After spending three years in prison for freeing his family's slaves, he joined the Korean independence movement and went to Manchuria to fight against the Empire of Japan. While in Manchuria, Kim established the Northern Military Administration Office in 1919 and trained Korean soldiers in guerrilla warfare before going on to lead the Korean Independence Army to victory in the Battle of Cheongsanri.

In 1920, Kim co-founded the Korean Independence Corps and went to Siberia, but was forced back to Manchuria following the Free City Incident. He was subsequently influenced by anarchism and in 1925 established the New People's Administration, which Kim intended to follow egalitarian and libertarian principles. Following a split in the Administration, in 1929 he joined with young socialists and anarchists to establish the Korean People's Association in Manchuria, a self-governing federation of agricultural cooperatives. In 1930, he was assassinated by a young member of the Communist Party of Korea. Kim is considered a national hero in modern-day South Korea and has been compared to the Ukrainian anarchist Nestor Makhno.

== Biography ==
=== Early life and education ===
Kim Chwajin was born in 1889, into a Korean noble family, in Hongseong County of southern Joseon. He took the art name of "Paegya" (백야; 白冶), and from an early age, he began to believe in social justice.

In 1905, Kim enrolled in the military academy of the Imperial Korean Armed Forces and specialised in the martial art of Yudo. He also became proficient in horseriding, marksmanship and sword fighting. Only two years later, the Japan–Korea Treaty of 1907 compelled the Korean armed forces to disband. The military academy was itself reduced to only 15 recruits, including Kim himself; he graduated as an officer before the military academy was dissolved by a royal decree in September 1909.

When he turned 18, he freed all his family's slaves; he burnt their slave register and even redistributed some of his own land to the more than 50 families he had freed. This was the first large-scale slave emancipation in modern Korean history, for which Kim was sentenced to three years' imprisonment.

=== Leadership in the independence movement ===
Following the Japanese annexation of Korea in 1910 and the outbreak of the March First Movement in 1919, Kim went to Manchuria and joined the Korean independence movement. There he became a follower of Daejongism, a new religious order which gained popularity among independence fighters in Manchuria. On 18 October 1919, Kim established the Northern Military Administration Office in Manchuria's Jilin province, where he began training Koreans to fight against the Imperial Japanese Army; he would end up training more than 400 soldiers for the cause. He also dispatched agents to Seoul, in Japanese-occupied Korea, to make contact with the underground resistance and gather funds for their insurgent operations in Manchuria. Before long, Korean independent fighters began clashing with Japanese troops along the border between Manchuria and Korea.

In 1920, Kim received intelligence that the Japanese were planning a raid into Manchuria, which forced him to transfer his Military Administration to the relative safety of the Changbai Mountains. In October of that year, following the Hunchun incident, 15,000 Japanese troops were dispatched into Manchuria to attack the Korean forces. Kim then led the Korean Independence Army to victory against the Japanese in the Battle of Cheongsanri; this was the first Korean victory against the Japanese since the Japan–Korea Treaty of 1876, which immediately made Kim into a national hero for many Koreans. Kim then gathered his forces at Mishan, where they combined with the forces of Chi Ch'ŏngch'ŏn, Cho Sŏnghwan, Hong Beom-do and Sŏ Il to establish one united organisation: the Korean Independence Corps. They then moved into Siberia and briefly allied themselves with the Red Army against the Japanese intervention. But after the Free City Incident, the Reds disarmed the Korean Independence Corps and Kim took his forces back to Manchuria.

=== Leadership in the anarchist movement ===
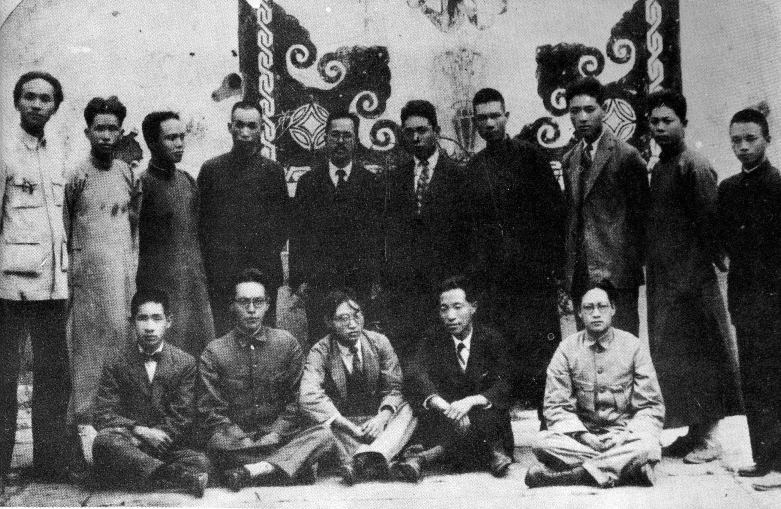
Members of the Korean Anarchist Federation in 1928

With the rising popularity of socialism among Korean independence activists in Manchuria during the 1920s, Kim began to synthesise the Korean nationalist philosophy of Na Ch'ŏl together with aspects of republicanism and anarchism. Kim particularly gravitated towards the political philosophy of anarchism, influenced by his relative, the Korean anarchist Kim Chongjin. In 1924, Kim received funding for his operations from the Bocheon religious leader Ch'a Kyŏngsŏk. In 1925, Kim established the New People's Administration in Northern Manchuria, where he aimed to establish an egalitarian and libertarian society.

The New People's Administration became the de facto government in northern Manchuria; it was governed by a separation of powers, with Kim leading its military committee. From this position, Kim oversaw the establishment of a military academy, commanded about 500 soldiers and cultivated a farm to feed his troops. By 1929, the Administration's civil government had joined together with the General Staff Headquarters and Righteous Government (two other de facto Korean governments in Manchuria) to establish the National People's Government. Meanwhile, Kim's military faction had joined together with the socialists of the Korean Youth League to establish the Revolutionary Assembly.

In August 1929, the Korean Anarchist Federation approached Kim's revolutionaries with a plan to establish a self-governing federation of agricultural cooperatives in Manchuria. Kim Chwajin agreed and together they founded the Korean People's Association in Manchuria. As general of the Korean Independence Army, Kim himself acted as the organisation's military leader. As the KPAM grew, it came under threat from the Communist Party of Korea, the Empire of Japan and the Chinese nationalist government. The Japanese imperialists and Korean Communists, who viewed the KPAM as a threat to their attempts to assert hegemony over Manchuria, respectively attacked it from the south and the north.

=== Death and aftermath ===
Kim was assassinated in January 1930, while he was repairing a cooperative's rice mill. The assassin Pak Sang-sil – a member of the Communist Party of Korea – escaped, but his handler Kim Bong-whan was captured and killed. Soon after his death, the KPAM began to experience financial difficulties and lost more of its leading members. In September 1930, anarchist activist Yi Ŭlgyu (이을규) was arrested; and in July 1931, Kim Chongjin was killed. By 1932, the KPAM had collapsed under pressure from the Japanese invasion of Manchuria. The Korean anarchist movement was forced underground and continued resisting Japanese imperialism. Members of the Revolutionary Assembly established the Korea Independence Party, which came under the leadership of Hong Chin and Chi Ch'ŏngch'ŏn. The Korean Independence Army remained active in Northern Manchuria until 1933, when it moved south into China.

== Legacy ==
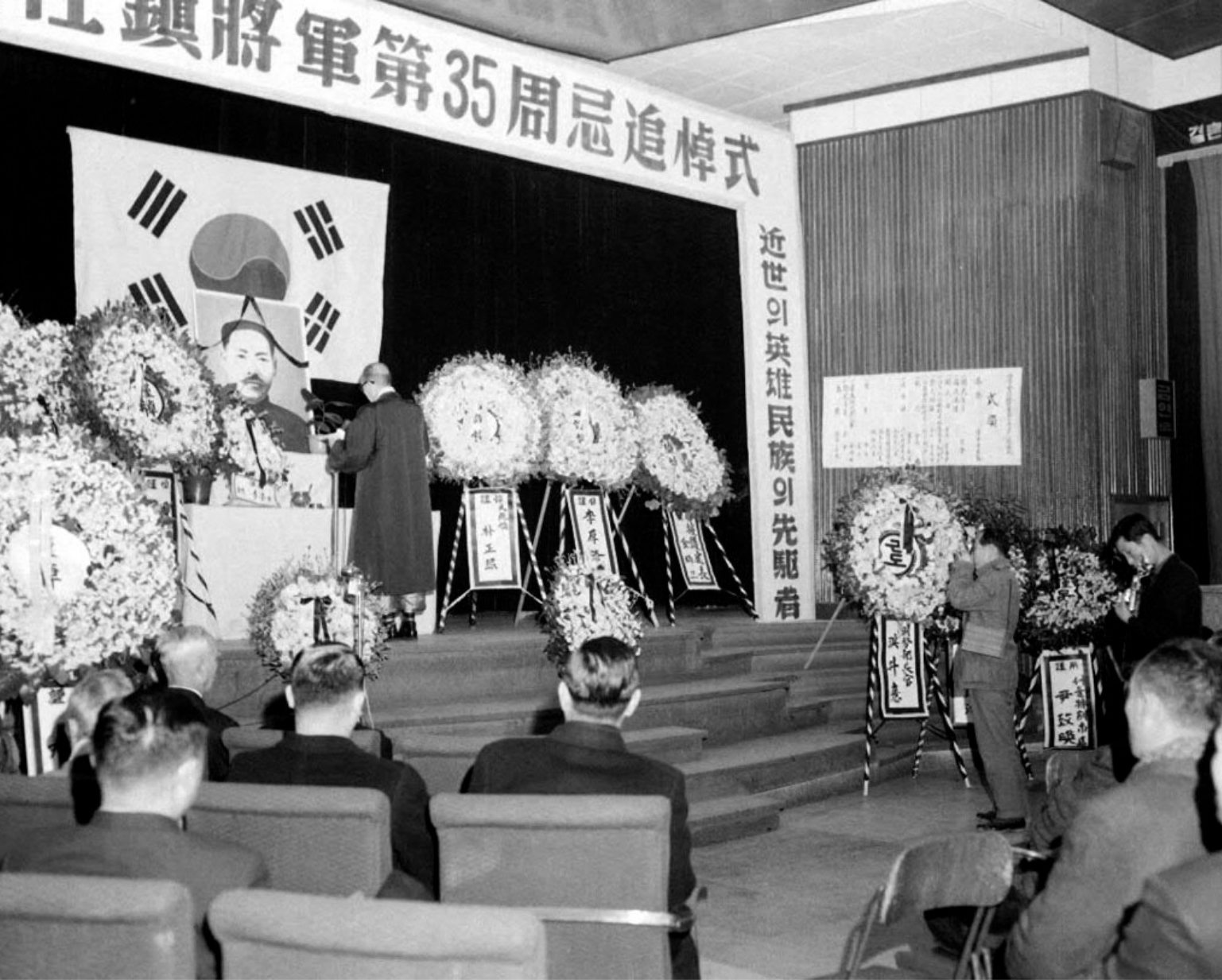
Commemoration of Kim Chwajin's 35th death anniversary, 1965, South Korea

Kim's victories with the Korean independence movement made him a national hero, and is remembered today as a patriot. In 1962, Kim was posthumously awarded the Republic of Korea Medal of the Order of Merit for National Foundation. Kim's leadership in the Battle of Cheongsanri was the centre of in an exhibition in the Independence Hall of Korea, where visitors can walk through a recreation of the scene of the battle. His portrait, alongside that of his fellow commander Hong Beom-do, is prominently displayed among the photographs of the battle in the exhibition hall. Kim also has a statue in the Independence Hall, where it is placed alongside statues of Korean independence activists An Jung-geun and Yun Bong-gil.

His birthplace, in Hongseong County, was declared a national monument. In 1991, the local government of Hongseong County restored the house where Kim was born and built an exhibition building dedicated to him nearby. From 1998 to 2001, the county also constructed a shrine to Kim. Every October, in commemoration of his victory at Cheongsanri, the county holds a festival in Kim's honour.

Kim has often been compared to the Ukrainian anarchist revolutionary Nestor Makhno, and came to be known as the "Korean Makhno". Alongside Makhno, the South African sociologist Lucien van der Walt also compared Kim to the Mexican anarchists Julio López Chávez and Francisco Zalacosta, and the Nicaraguan revolutionary Augusto Sandino, due to their promotion of libertarian socialism and their rallying of the peasantry to revolutionary action.

Kim Du-han, a right-wing politician and gangster in South Korea, claimed to be the son of Kim Chwajin, although scholars have debated whether this is true. Kim Du-han and his alleged connection to Kim Chwajin was the subject of the film General's Son, which kicked off a wave of South Korean crime films.

== See also ==
- Buenaventura Durruti – Spanish anarchist militant (1896–1936)
- Ricardo Flores Magón – Mexican anarchist, social reform activist, and revolutionary (1874–1922)
- Liu Shifu – Chinese anarchist (1884–1915)
- Rustic Period – 2002 television series about the Korean independence movement
- Shin Chae-ho – Korean historian (1880–1936)

== Bibliography ==
- Allison, Charlie (2023). "Kim Chwa-chin". No Harmless Power: The Life and Times of the Ukrainian Anarchist Nestor Makhno. PM Press. p. 199. ISBN 978-1-62963-471-5.
- Ha, Ki-rak (1986). A History of Korean Anarchist Movement. Anarchist Publishing Committee. OCLC 32236908.
- Hall, Emily Marie Anderson (2019). Kim Sŏnghwan's 'Mr. Kobau': Editorial Cartoons as Genre Weapons in South Korean Search for Democracy, 1945-1972 (PhD). University of Washington.
- Han, Suk-Jung (2024). The Origin of the 1960s Korean Developmental Regime: Manchurian Modern. Rowman & Littlefield. ISBN 9781666951875.
- Hirsch, Steven J.; van der Walt, Lucien (2010). "Rethinking Anarchism and Syndicalism: the colonial and postcolonial experience, 1870–1940". In Hirsch, Steven J.; van der Walt, Lucien (eds.). Anarchism and Syndicalism in the Colonial and Postcolonial World, 1870–1940. Studies in Global Social History. Vol. 6. Leiden: Brill. pp. xxxi–lxxiii. ISBN 9789004188495. OCLC 868808983.
- Hwang, Dongyoun (2016). Anarchism in Korea: Independence, Transnationalism, and the Question of National Development, 1919-1984. Albany, New York: SUNY Press. ISBN 978-1-4384-6167-0. OCLC 1039293708.
- Jang-Whan, O. H. (2009). "Kim Joa-jin (1889–1930)". In Ness, Immanuel (ed.). The International Encyclopedia of Revolution and Protest. p. 1. doi:10.1002/9781405198073.wbierp0854. ISBN 9781405198073.
- Jorgensen, John (2017). "Poch'ŏn'gyo and the Imperial State: Negotiations Between the Spiritual and Secular Governments". In Anderson, E. (ed.). Belief and Practice in Imperial Japan and Colonial Korea. Religion and Society in Asia Pacific. Palgrave Macmillan. doi:10.1007/978-981-10-1566-3_10.
- Kang, Man-gil (2019). A History of Contemporary Korea. Brill. ISBN 9789004213746.
- Kim, Se Young (2018). "Jung Doo-hong and the Gangster Body: Kkangpae in Contemporary South Korean Cinema". In Larke-Walsh, George S. (ed.). A Companion to the Gangster Film. doi:10.1002/9781119041757.ch27. ISBN 9781119041665.
- Lee, H. K. (2023). "Beyond "imagined" nostalgia: Gunsan's heritagization of Japanese colonial architecture in South Korea". International Journal of Asian Studies. 20 (1): 91–113. doi:10.1017/S1479591421000243.
- Park, Hwan (2002). "Na, Chŏl and the Characteristics of His National Movement" (PDF). International Journal of Korean History. 3: 225–256. ISSN 2508-5921.
- Park, Sang-jung; Im, Yoo-shin (2020). "A case study on the core competencies of military leadership for junior officers" (PDF). International Journal of Military Affairs. 5 (1): 1–12. ISSN 2423-8775.
- Podoler, Guy (2011). Monuments, memory, and identity: Constructing the Colonial Past in South Korea. Peter Lang. ISBN 9783035102888.
- Ramnath, Maia (2019). "Non-Western Anarchisms and Postcolonialism". In Levy, Carl; Adams, Matthew S. (eds.). The Palgrave Handbook of Anarchism. Palgrave Macmillan. ISBN 978-3-319-75619-6.
- Shin, Michael D. (2024). "Reader-Created Content: the 'Reader and Reporter' (Dokja wa gija) Features in the Donga ilbo, January–November 1925". East Asian Publishing and Society. 14 (2): 186–224. doi:10.1163/22106286-12341393.
- Tikhonov, Vladimir (2023). The Red Decades: Communism as Movement and Culture in Korea, 1919–1945. University of Hawaii Press. ISBN 9780824896089.
- van der Walt, Lucien; Schmidt, Michael (2009). Black Flame: The Revolutionary Class Politics of Anarchism and Syndicalism. Edinburgh: AK Press. ISBN 978-1-904859-16-1. LCCN 2006933558. OCLC 1100238201.
