= Korean Northern Army Command =

1920 Korean independence activist army

- Leaders: Choi Jin-dong; Hong Beom-do
- Founded: May 22, 1920
- Dissolved: December 1920
- Country: Korea
- Allegiance: Provisional Government of the Republic of Korea
- Headquarters: Fengwudong, Jilin, China
- Ideology: Korean independence movement
- Size: 1,200

- Korean Northern Army Command
- Hangul: 대한북로독군부
- Hanja: 大韓北路督軍府
- Revised Romanization: Daehan Bungnodokgunbu
- McCune–Reischauer: Taehan Pungnodokkunbu

The Korean Northern Army Command (Korean: 대한북로독군부) was a union of militant independence groups formed by Hong Beom-do's Korean Independence Army, Cho An-mu's Korean National Army, and Choi Jin-dong's Military Affairs Command in May 1920, and played a leading role in winning the Battle of Fengwudong in June 1920.

== Background ==
The Korean Independence Army, which had established a base in North Gando carried out anti-Japanese armed activities together with the Korean Nationalist Army, discussed integration in early 1920 for effective anti-Japanese warfare. On February 21, 1920, Cho An-mu, commander of the National Army, and Hong Beom-do, commander of the Korean Independence Army, who had established a camp in Myeongwol-gu, Yanji County, met in Hamatang, Yanji County to discuss integration for the first time. Then, Choi Jin-dong, who had a camp in Bongo-dong, Chunhwa-hyang, Wangcheong-hyeon, joined in for three days from March 8 to 10, and on March 25. They met in succession on Sunday, April 22, May 7, and May 15 and tried to find an agreement for integration. However, despite their efforts, they were unable to unify their policies and ideologies and were unable to form a unified body, so they agreed to form a union with the National Army, and the Military Affairs Command. Thus, on May 22, 1920, they formed the Korean Northern Army Command, an alliance of North Gando independence forces.

== Organization ==
The Korean Northern Army Command, which is a union of the three representative independent corps in North Gando, consists of Director Choi Jin-dong, Adjutant Commander Cho An-mu, Korean Northern Military Commander Hong Beom-do, Headquarters Adjutant Joo Geon, Chiefs of Staff Lee Byeong-chae and Oh Joo-hyuk, and Lim Byeong-geuk was appointed as the head of the clothing department of this joint military unit. There were 900 but grew to 1,200 troops, and divided into four companies and a military police force under this command. The age of the troops was about 34, from 5 to 20 years old.

=== Units and their commanders ===
There were armed independence groups who joined this union as follows:

- Military Affairs Command: Choi Jin-dong
- Korean Independence Army: Hong Beom-do
- National Army: Cho An-mu
- Korean Democratic Corps: Kim Gyu-moon

=== Agreement ===
Representatives of the armed independence movement groups signed an agreement in Bongo-dong, the headquarters of the Choi Un-san brothers as follows:

1. Registration of military registration within each organization is mutually mandatory and cannot be incorporated.
2. In the future, the establishment of local organizations and recruitment of personnel will follow the public will.
3. When each organization needs to raise funds, it must be decided by the council.
4. In the case of a union between an organization and an organization, the council must agree.
5. Each institution cannot mutually infringe upon local institutions.
6. Regardless of the sub-organization, if there is negligence, we will work together to save the case.
7. For organizations that do not comply with today’s order, we will mutually recommend them in good faith and allow them to participate in the association.
8. January 15 of each year shall be designated as the regular session of the council.
9. When there is a special matter, a special meeting will be held if two or more organizations agree.
10. Two council members will be dispatched from each organization each meeting.
11. If there is an organization that violates the above treaty, the last resort will be used if the second recommendation is not made.
12. The prize pledge period is 11 days. The next meeting will be held on March 15.

Hong Beom-do conducted an operation to enter the country starting in the summer of 1919, while also focusing on the unification movement and joint operations among the independence corps. He first consulted with members of the Korean National Association in places such as Wangcheong-hyeon's Yeo-ja-jeong and Seo-gyeong-myeon, and agreed to build a united front. It was agreed that the Korean National Association would be in charge of administration and finances, and in the case of military affairs, Hong Beom-do would lead the Korean Independence Army and Cho An-mu would lead the Korean National Army. They promoted military unification with Choi Jin-dong's Military Provincial Administration. The integrated corps concentrated its forces in Bongo-dong, where the headquarters of the Military Provincial Administration was located, and carried out ceaseless operations to enter the country. However, in the case of actual combat, Hong Beom-do was to command the entire army with the title of Commander-in-Chief of the Korean Northern Military Command.

=== Equipment ===
They wore modified suits and waistcoats, carrying blankets on their backs and preparing a pair of shoes. However, in the case of the independence army, there were cases where they had regular uniforms, such as the military administration army, but they generally appeared as farmers or hunters, and because of this, the Japanese army had difficulty identifying the independence army. They're armed with 900 rifles, and 50 pistols. It was a powerful combined unit that was also equipped with over 100 grenades and two machine guns. But the Japanese imperial intelligence records provide a relatively detailed picture of the capabilities of the Korean Northern Military Command. According to this, the Korean Independence Army branch has 460 troops, 200 rifles, 40,000 rounds of ammunition, and 50 pistols, while the Military Affairs Command and the National Army branch has about 280 troops, 200 rifles, and 12,000 rounds of ammunition. It had 1,000 rounds, 120 grenades, and 2 machine guns.

== Battles ==
The Korean Northern Army Command, which was born in the form of a well-organized corps rather than a simple union, carried out active guerrilla warfare entering the country immediately after its launch. Even before the birth of the Korean Northern Military Command, the three corps that participated in it and the guerrilla forces of the independence army belonging to several independence corps in North Gando frequently conducted wars into the country and punished the Japanese invaders. However, with the establishment of the independent military government, the independence armies became more confident and carried out more guerrilla warfare while inflicting serious blows on the Japanese.

=== Battle of Samdunja ===
On June 4, 1920, an independence army guerrilla force consisting of 30 people crossed the Duman River and entered Korea, attacked and defeated a Japanese military police patrol stationed in Gangyang-dong, 5 ri north of Jongseong, and returned home. The Japanese, who suffered great damage from the independence army's attack, immediately formed a pursuit force and chased after them . The pursuit force consisted of a company of the South Sea Garrison led by Japanese Lieutenant Jiro Niimi (新美二郞) and a company of military police. When these Japanese troops did not discover the independence army that attacked them until they crossed the Duman River and reached Samdunja, they committed the atrocity of attacking the houses of innocent civilians. The independence fighters, who witnessed this while lurking at the foot of the mountain southwest of Samdunja, ransacked private homes and attacked and annihilated the unwary Japanese pursuit force in a surprise attack.

Signal soldiers stationed throughout the area reported to headquarters that a large Japanese army unit was invading . Accordingly, under the operational order of Commander Hong Beom-do, the headquarters contacted the Korean houses on the road leading to the independence army camp and ordered them to take refuge, and deployed soldiers in layers to the north, south, east, and west of the mountains surrounding the Bongo-dong Valley to hide them . And in order to lure the Japanese army, which was eager to attack the independence army, the squad members led by Lee Hwa-il (李化日), a squad leader from the 3rd Platoon of the 2nd Company, were deployed to Goryeoryeong (高麗嶺), the road leading to Bongo-dong.

=== Battle of Fengwudong ===
The Japanese army, which reached the entrance to Bongo-dong around 8:30 a.m., saw that neither the Ewha-il unit nor the independence army were visible at all, so they judged that everyone had fled to avoid their attack . So, with a somewhat relaxed mind, they continued their movement into the valley, plundering the houses of the Korean village formed at the bottom of the Bongo-dong Valley. At around 1 p.m., the Japanese advance unit entered a position about 300 meters south of Sangchon Village in Bongo-dong. This was a mountain surrounded on three sides by a forest even thicker than the entrance . And the place where the Japanese army's advance unit was located was in the very center of the area where the independence forces were ambushed on the mountains on three sides. As nothing happened to the vanguard unit, the main unit arrived soon after.

When almost the entire force of the Wolgang Pursuit Corps was completely trapped in the independence army's siege, Commander Hong Beom-do fired a signal to signal an attack. In an instant, the independence army opened fire at the same time from the hills on all three sides except the road where the Japanese army entered. The Japanese military command, taken aback by the surprise attack, put two companies, Kamiya (神谷) Company and Nakanishi (中西) Company, at the front and made a desperate charge . And the machine guns were ordered to focus fire on the mountain from which the bullets were flying . However, it was difficult to hit the independence fighters who were firing bullets while concealed between rocks with dense trees and high altitude. The Japanese army, who held out for about three hours in this unfavorable situation, began to retreat as casualties increased as time went by . As the Japanese army retreated, the Independence Army attacked from behind them . The Japanese Army's Wolgang Pursuit Battalion was ultimately defeated, suffering numerous casualties in the Bongo-dong Valley and during the retreat .

After the battle, the results announced by the Provisional Government of the Republic of Korea were 157 Japanese dead, 200 seriously injured, and 100 lightly injured. On the other hand, the Independence Army had only 4 dead and 2 seriously injured. It was a complete victory for the Korean independence army. Even before the Battle of Bongo-dong, the Independence Army recorded several victories, including the Battle of Samdunja. However, the Battle of Bongo-dong became the starting point of the war of independence, showing the aggressor Japanese imperialists proof that the Korean people would definitely achieve national liberation. Lim Byeong-geuk was also present at the starting point .

=== Hunchun Incident ===
Japan instigated the Hunchun incident on October 2 of the same year by bribing the Chinese enemy to attack and destroy the Japanese Consulate in Hunchun . The purpose was to create an excuse for a large-scale invasion of troops into the Northwest Gando . When the fabricated Hunchun Incident occurred, Japan invaded Northwest Jiandao with approximately 20,000 troops under the pretext of catching the criminals who destroyed the Japanese consulate . As if encircling the northwest Gando, this invading army included the Siberian Expeditionary Force from the east, the 19th and 20th Divisions of the Japanese Joseon Army from the south, the Kwantung Army from the west, and the North Manchuria Detachment from the north . The Japanese imperialists put aside the magical attack they had used as a pretext and had the Japanese army head straight to the independence army base in the northwest Gando region .

However, the independence fighters were already aware of the Japanese plan through intelligence before the Hunchun Incident. Therefore, rather than engage in an all-out war against the Japanese imperial army and suffer great damage, the independence army decided to use a temporary strategy of avoidance. According to this strategy, the independence corps in North Gando decided to move their troops to the west of the densely forested Baekdu Mountain foothills from late August and early September, and put this into practice . The independence corps in Western Jiandao also acted similarly . Before the Japanese army reached the camp, the independence forces of the Korean Northern Army Command also established mutual contact under the leadership of commanders such as Hong Beom-do and Anmu, and moved their troops towards the foot of Baekdu Mountain. However, Choi Jin-dong's Military Provincial Administration broke away from the Korean Northern Army Command, and acted separately, choosing a course in the northeast direction rather than toward the foot of Baekdu Mountain.

=== Battle of Qingshanli ===
The Battle of Qingshanli (Korean name "Cheongsanri") occurred during the movement of the independence armies. The Korean Independence Army and the Northern Military Administration Office, who left the camp in North Gando, arrived at Ido-gu, Hwaryong-hyeon (和龍縣) in late September 1920. At the same time, independence armies belonging to the Righteous Army Command, Korean Democratic Corps, and Uimindan, which were establishing camps in the same northern Gando area, also gathered in Ido-gu at almost the same time.

The commanders of the command gathered in Hwaryonghyeon and Samdogu discussed the future schedule. It was difficult to reach a clear conclusion as the meeting was conducted while monitoring the sympathy of the Japanese military coming from all directions. Meanwhile, the Azuma (Eastern) division of the Japanese army, which had learned of the assembly location of the independence army through a spy, moved its troops towards I-Samdo-gu. As a large Japanese army approached, the independence army commanders judged that it would be difficult to clear the path without a decisive battle. Accordingly, in Cheongsan-ri, Samdo-gu, Kim Jwa-jin's Northern Military Administration Office prepared for battle and prepared to meet the Japanese army. Hong Beom-do united the independence corps gathered in Ido-gu. The Nationalist Army also participated in this combined unit, and Lim Byeong-geuk took on the position of mid-level executive, leading his subordinates and preparing for battle.

On the morning of October 21, 1920, Japanese troops of the Yamada Regiment of the Azuma Region passed through Cheongsanri Village in Samdo-gu and entered the Baekunpyeong Valley, where the Northern Military Administration Office was occupying the hill, around 8:00 AM. Over the course of about an hour, about 200 advance guard troops from the Yamada Regiment entered deep into the valley. At that moment, under the order of Commander Kim Jwa-jin, the independence fighters of the Northern Military Administration Office who were hiding on the hill opened fire all at once. About 200 Japanese soldiers were instantly annihilated by the fire of the independence fighters. The main unit that rushed to support the vanguard unit also suffered damage from gunfire from the independence army and had to withdraw.

The main force of the Azuma region, excluding the Yamada Regiment heading to Baekunpyeong, headed to Wanlu-gu, Ido -gu, where the Hong Beom - do joint forces were stationed . Azuma Zizi, who arrived at Idogu on October 22, divided his forces into two and headed to North Wanlu and South Wanlu respectively, intending to surround and attack the combined forces. However, Hong Beom-do, who noticed this operation in the Azuma area, pretended to launch an all-out war against the Japanese troops coming from the north and south, and had some of his troops return to the middle road to attack from the side. As in the Battle of Baekunpyeong, an operation was carried out to place the Japanese army in one place and fire concentrated fire. The Battle of Wanrugu was also a major victory for the independence army .

Afterwards, Hong Beom-do's combined troops and Kim Jwa-jin's Northern Military Administration Office marched around Ido-gu and Samdo-gu in Cheonsubyeong, Eorangchon, Maenggaegol, Manrok- gu, and Seo - gu (West) for about 10 days. He continued to win battles at places such as Mt. Cheonbo, Mt. Kodongha, and other places. There was a Korean village called Cheongsan-ri in Samdo-gu, which leads to Baekunpyeong, where the Northern Military Government and the Japanese army fought their first battle, and the immigrant Koreans collectively called the area Cheongsanri. Therefore, this victory of the independence army is called the Battle of Cheongsanri in history. In the Battle of Cheongsanri, the independence army killed about 1,200 Japanese soldiers and wounded 200.

=== Gando Massacre ===
Meanwhile, after the Battle of Cheongsanri, the main force of the independence army moved to northern Manchuria, and commanders such as Lim Byeong-geuk led some of their troops to mountainous areas and disappeared, causing the Japanese invaders to commit atrocities against the immigrant Korean community. Under the pretext of hunting down 'bad people,' the Japanese soldiers searched various places in Korean villages, shooting numerous ordinary Korean men and women, and raping or killing women. Even children as young as 2–3 years old were stabbed with spears, a barbaric act that elicited joy while hearing their wailing screams. Not only were people killed, but houses, churches, and schools owned by Koreans were all set on fire, turning the Korean community itself into ruins . These atrocities by the Japanese military continued until April of the following year. According to a survey conducted by a Provisional Government dispatcher in October and November 1920, the damage to the Korean community in Northwest Gando was as follows: 3,664 people were murdered., 155 people were arrested, and 3,520 homes, 59 schools, and 19 churches were burned down or destroyed.

== Korean Independence Corps ==
The independence forces changed their original route to the west of Baekdusan Mountain and headed toward northern Manchuria. Around December 1920, approximately 3,500 independence fighters gathered in Mt. Milsan, northern Manchuria, formed an integrated corps called the Korean Independence Corps, organized the ranks, and moved to Iman, Russia in early January of the following year . However, Lim Byeong-geuk did not join them at this time, but led his subordinate independence army to their first destination, Ando-hyeon (安圖縣), west of Baekdu Mountain. Lim Byeong-geuk built a barracks in a dense forest and organized a volunteer corps of independent soldiers.

== See also ==
- Korean Independence Movement
  - List of militant Korean independence activist organizations
    - Korean Independence Army
    - Northern Military Administration Office
- Hong Beom-do
