= Hongseong County =

County in South Chungcheong, South Korea

Hongseong
- County
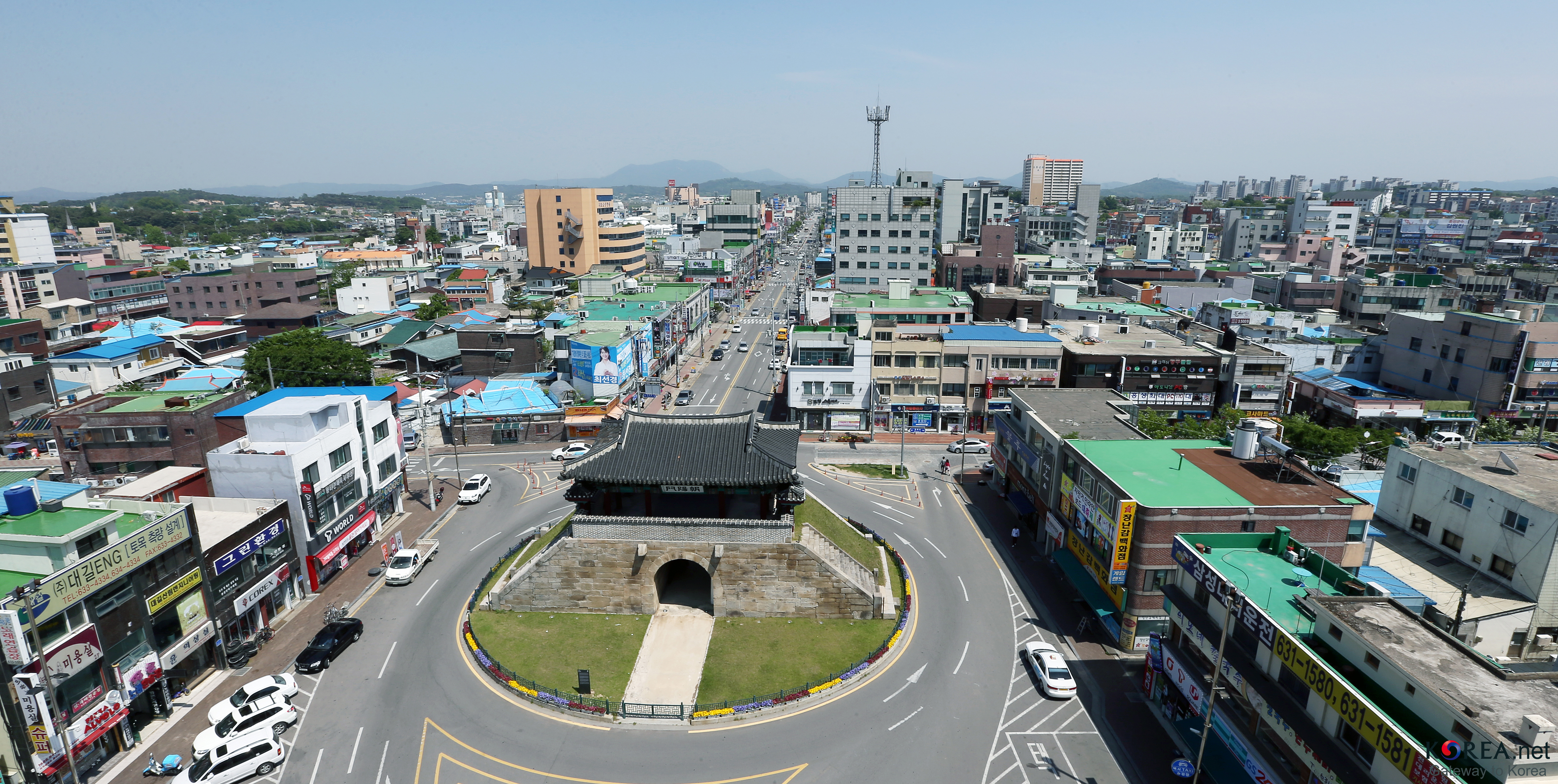
- Hongjuseong Fortres

- Flag Emblem of Hongseong

- Location in South Korea
- Coordinates: 36°35′58″N 126°39′46″E
- Country: South Korea
- Region: Hoseo
- Administrative divisions: 3 eup, 8 myeon

Government
  - mayor: Lee Yong-log (이용록)

Area
  - Total: 443.5 km^{2} (171.2 sq mi)

Population (September 2024)
  - Total: 98,866
  - Density: 201.1/km^{2} (521/sq mi)
  - Dialect: Chungcheong
- Time zone: UTC+9 (Korea Standard Time)
- Area code: +82-41

Korean name
- Hangul: 홍성군
- Hanja: 洪城郡
- RR: Hongseong-gun
- MR: Hongsŏng-gun

Hongseong County (Korean: 홍성군) is a county in South Korea, and the capital of South Chungcheong Province. The current governor is Lee Yong-log. The original name of the city is Hongju.

== Symbols ==
- The flag represents the Joyang Gate along with the west coastal line.
- The region's flower is the forsythia, which symbolizes the warmth and kindness in the hearts of the people of Hongseong.
- The region's tree is the zelkova, which is known for providing a lot of shade. This symbolizes the loyalty and patriotism of the people of Hongseong.
- The region's bird is the magpie, which is also the national bird of Korea. It symbolizes good luck, good news and hope.

== Population ==
Population Distribution of Hongseong County:
Administrative District	Male	Female	Total	Percent
Hongseong-eup	18,979	19,313	38,292	38.33%
Gwangcheon-eup	4,169	4,340	8,509	8.52%
Hongbuk-eup	14,300	14,262	28,562	28.59%
Geumma-myeon	1,782	1,722	3,504	3.51%
Hongdong-myeon	1,748	1,708	3,456	3.46%
Janggok-myeon	1,419	1,523	2,942	2.94%
Eunha-myeon	1,166	1,142	2,308	2.31%
Gyeolseong-myeon	1,028	1,083	2,111	2.11%
Seobu-myeon	1,609	1,651	3,260	3.26%
Galsan-myeon	1,753	1,764	3,517	3.52%
Guhang-myeon	1,736	1,712	3,448	3.45%
Total	49,689	50,220	99,909	100%

== Historical figures ==
Historical figures born in Hongseong:

- Ch'oe Yŏng (1316): General during the Goryeo Dynasty
- Sŏng Sammun (1418): Notable scholar during the Joseon Dynasty
- Han Seong-jun (1875): Master of Korean dance during the Japanese Colonial Era
- Han Yong-un (1879): Buddhist reformer
- Kim Jwa-jin (1889): anarcho-communist activist
- Yoo Byung-jae (1988): actor, screenwriter

== Cultural assets ==
In Hongseong, a large statue of Buddha is engraved on a protruding rock carved into the shape of a shrine. Overall, the headpiece is solid and integrity is shown on the face, but the statue is unbalanced from its loss of volume towards the bottom.

Site attributed to Ch'oe Yŏng:

- Gibongsa: in Noeunli, shrine that was reconstructed in 1995; site of a memorial service every fall to comfort General Yeong's soul

Sites attributed to Sŏng Sammun:

- Teacher Sŏng Sammun's Tomb: in Noeunli, where his mother's family lived and where he was born; previously a lecture hall closed in 1676
- Teacher Sŏng Sammun Memorial Stone: in Noeunli, preservation house for engraved Yuheobi memorial stone
- Noeundan: in Noeunri, site of memorial service performed every October 10; holds Sŏng Sammun's ancestral tablets

Sites attributed to Han Yong-un:

- Birthplace of Manhae, Han Yongwun: a memorial in Gyeolseongmyeon
- Manhaesa Shrine: in Hongbukmyeon, built to hold his portrait
- Statue of Manhae, Han Yongwun: in Namjangli, built to set his work as an indication of national spirit
- Manhae, Han Yongwun Culture Experience Hall: in Gyeolseongmyeon, built in 2007 in front of his birthplace to commemorate his spirit and philosophy

Sites attributed to Kim Jwajin:

- Birthplace of General Kim Jwajin: in Paekya Park in Galsanmyeon, where he was born and raised; restoration started in 1991
- Memorial stone to pay a tribute to the memory of General Kim Jwajin: in Galsanmyeon, describes his achievements; constructed in 1949
- Statue of General Kim Jwajin: in Goamli, articulates his achievement when he wiped out a Japanese army at 31 years of age
- Baekyasa: in Galsanmyeon, shrine where service is held during the Baekya festival every October 25

== Festivals ==
- Namdangli Cockle Festival: The coastal topographical features of the Hongseong area, particularly the Cheonsu Bay area, provide abundant egg cockles. Egg cockles taste unique and not easy to eat in city areas. Because of these reasons, the festival gradually became successful. However, an oil spill around Taean made it difficult to host this festival recently. Hongseong did not suffer direct damage from the oil spill. The county took place as the host on Jan 16 of 2008.
- Naepo Festival: First begun in 2004, this festival honors the Naepo culture throughout Hongseong in the month of October. It represents the loyalty of the culture of Hongseong people. It includes many competitions and performances while commemorating General Ch'oe Yŏng and those who sacrificed their lives in the battle at Hongju Castle.
- Festival of General Kim’s victory: This festival is held every October at General Kim Jwa-jin's birthplace and shrine to commemorate his victory in Cheongsanli. The spectacles include Bongsan Mask dancing, pungmul performance, military school events, makgeolli tasting, and more.

== See also ==
- Geography of South Korea
