= Battle of Qingshanli =

1920 Korean militia-Japanese battle

- Part of the Korean Independence Movement
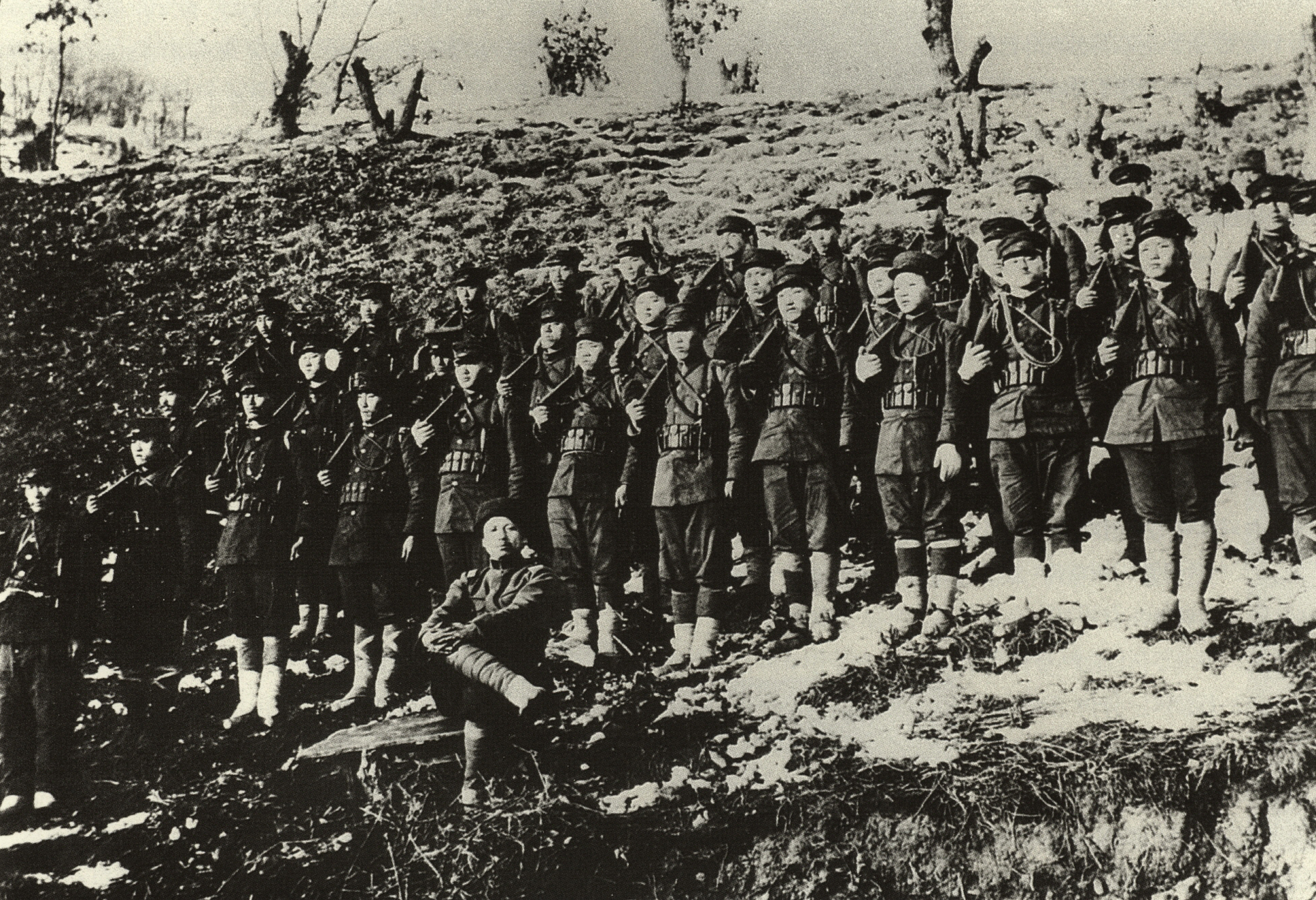
- Commemorative photo after the Battle of Qingshanli
Date	21–26 October 1920
Location	Qīngshānlǐ, Jílín, China
Result	Inconclusive

Belligerents
Imperial Japanese Army; Japanese Korean Army; Higashi Task Force	Provisional Government of the Republic of Korea: Northern Military Administration Office; Korean Northern Army Command

Commanders and leaders
Masahiko Higashi	Kim Jwa-jin; Lee Beom-seok; Hong Beom-do; Cho An-Mu

Strength
Brigade-sized Task Force	About 3,000

Casualties and losses
Japanese record: 6 killed Korean claim: 812–1,200 killed 3,300 wounded	60 killed 90 wounded

The Battle of Qingshanli (Korean: 청산리 전투; Hanja: 靑山里戰鬪) was fought over six days in October 1920 between the Imperial Japanese Army and Korean armed groups in a densely wooded region of eastern Manchuria called Qingshanli (Japanese: 青山里, Seizanri; Korean: 청산리, Cheongsanri). It occurred during the campaign of the Japanese army in Jiandao, during the Japanese rule of Korea (1910–1945).

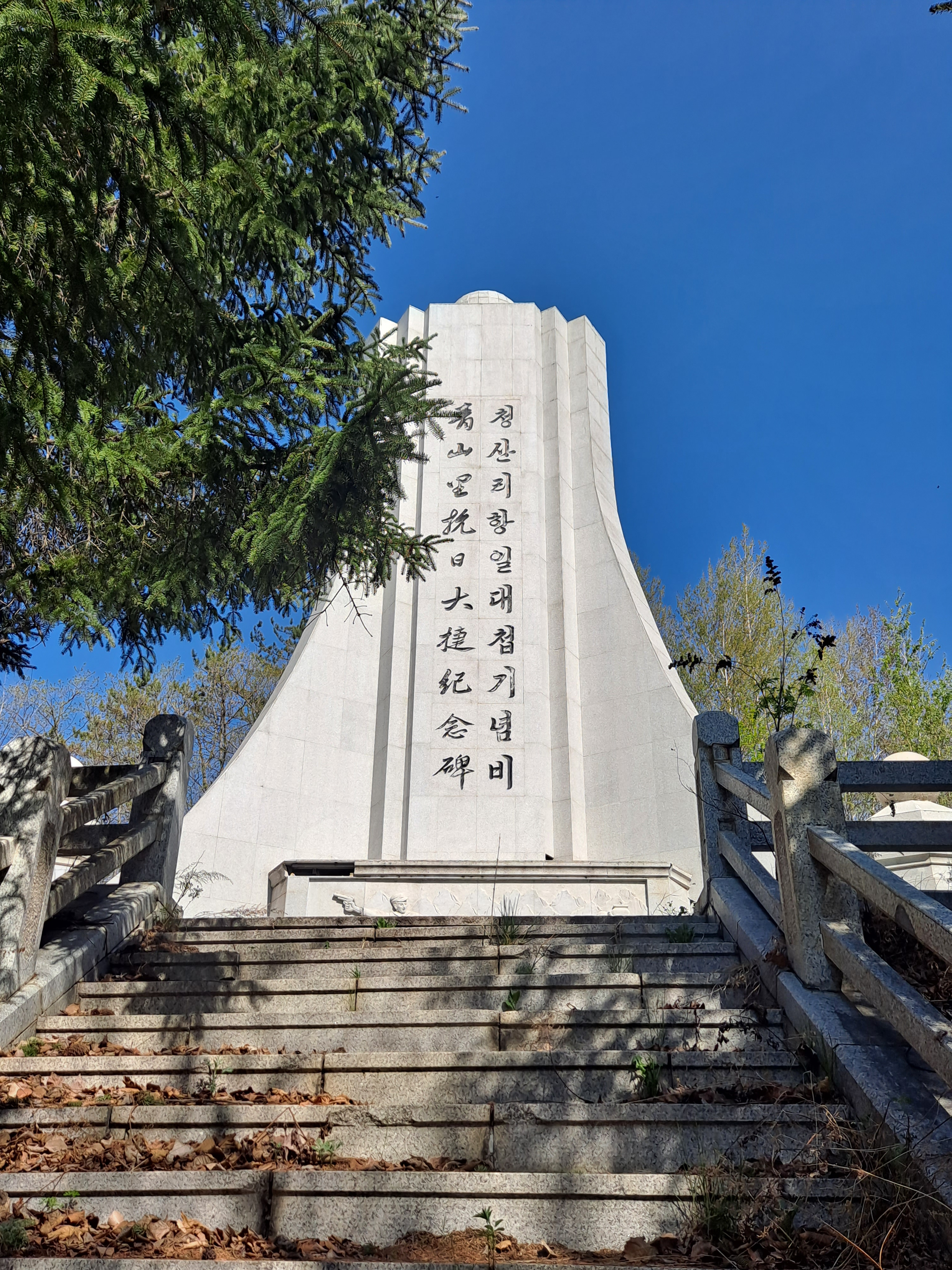
Battle of Qingshanli Monument

== Background ==
After the March 1st Movement of 1919 by Koreans calling for liberation from Japanese occupation, some Korean activists formed an independence army in Manchuria. The Japanese government asked China to subdue them, to limited effect.

On 2 October 1920, the Independence Army raided Hun-ch'un and killed 13 Japanese including the commissioner of the consulate police. In response, Japan decided to send troops to eastern Manchuria. Japan immediately held talks with China, and on 16 October received permission for military action in eastern Jilin from the governor of Jilin.

== Combat ==
The Japanese forces who joined the expedition were the 28th Brigade of the 19th Division, which was on its way back to Japan, and two units from the 11th and 13th Divisions who had been sent to Vladivostok. Among them, only the 19th Division of the Choson Army of Japan, part of the Imperial Japanese Army garrisoned in Korea, engaged in combat. The 19th Division was deployed to Hunchun (Isobayashi Task Force), Wangqing (Kimura Task Force) and Yanji-Helong (Higashi Task Force). The Isobayashi and Kimura Task Forces engaged in no significant conflict.

From 21 to 23 October, the Northern military administration office army (Korean: 북로군정서군; Hanja: 北路軍政署軍) led by Kim Jwa-jin lured Japanese soldiers and attacked them in Baiyunping (白雲坪), Quanshuiping (泉水坪), and Wanlougou (完樓溝). The Korean guerilla force was victorious. The Japanese forces were eventually relieved by the Higashi Task Force.

The Higashi Task Force engaged in combat with the Korean Independence Army on 23 October; Korean forces were led by Hong Beom-do. The Korean troops had the Japanese Higashi Task Force at a disadvantage, and the two forces fought the final battle in the town of Yulang (漁郎村). The Korean army claimed to have killed 1,200 Japanese soldiers and wounded thousands of others on 26 October, though the number of casualties is debated. After the assault, Korean forces retreated, pursued by the Japanese army.

The number of Japanese casualties was exaggerated, according Kim Hak-Cheor (also known as Song Jin-woo), who participated in many battles as a member of the Korean Independence Army. He argued that the number of Japanese casualties was exaggerated by a factor of 300 or more. According to him, when Korean independence forces encountered the Japanese army, they lost 9 out of 10 times, and even if they won, they could only kill 2 or 3 Japanese soldiers.

== Controversies ==
=== Hunchun massacre ===
South Korea views the Hunchun incident as a deception by Japan, who they believe used it as an excuse to dispatch troops.

=== Casualties of the Japanese army ===
The Japanese Korean Army's secret study of the Gando Expedition recorded a total of 11 troops killed and 28 wounded in the entire operation. Of these, three men from the 73rd Infantry Regiment were killed at Qingshanli on 21 October 1920 and three cavalrymen from the 27th Cavalry Regiment at Yulang Town on 22 October 1920. Japanese investigation of weapons of the 19th Division after the expedition claims that the Japanese army consumed little.

The only Japanese soldier Korean sources name was "Regimental Commander Kanō." "The Bloody History of the Korean Independence Movement" states that a secret paper by a Japanese consul reported Regimental Commander Kanō's death, although Japan has not revealed such a report so far. Japan claims the only man corresponding to "Regimental Commander Kanō" was Colonel Nobuteru Kanō, who served as commander of the 27th regiment, and that his name cannot be found in the casualty list, but is said to have led the regiment until 1922. Moreover, two months after the Battle of Qingshanli, the regiment commanded by Colonel Kanō captured one Korean. This event is recorded in a secret telegram from the Japanese consulate in Qingshanli on 13 November 1920.

On the contrary, South Koreans refer to this battle as the "great victory at Cheongsalli" and consider it a victory of the Independence Army. For the casualties of the Japanese army, Hanguk Doknip Undongji Hyulsa (韓國獨立運動之血史) by Bak Inseok (1920) states "900-1,600 including Regimental Commander Kanō," Daehan Minguk jeongdangsa compiled by the National Election Commission (1964) "over 1,000," Hanguk jeonjaengsa by the Military History Compilation Committee of the Ministry of National Defense (1967) "3,300 dead and wounded," and Hanguk Minjok Undongsa by Jo Jihun (1975) "3,300 including Regimental Commander Kanō."

According to Kim Hak-Cheor, who participated in many battles as a member of the armed group for the independence of Korea, the number of Japanese casualties that Koreans claimed was exaggerated more than 300 times.

== See also ==
- Battle of Fengwudong
- Battle of Pochonbo
