= History of Manchuria =

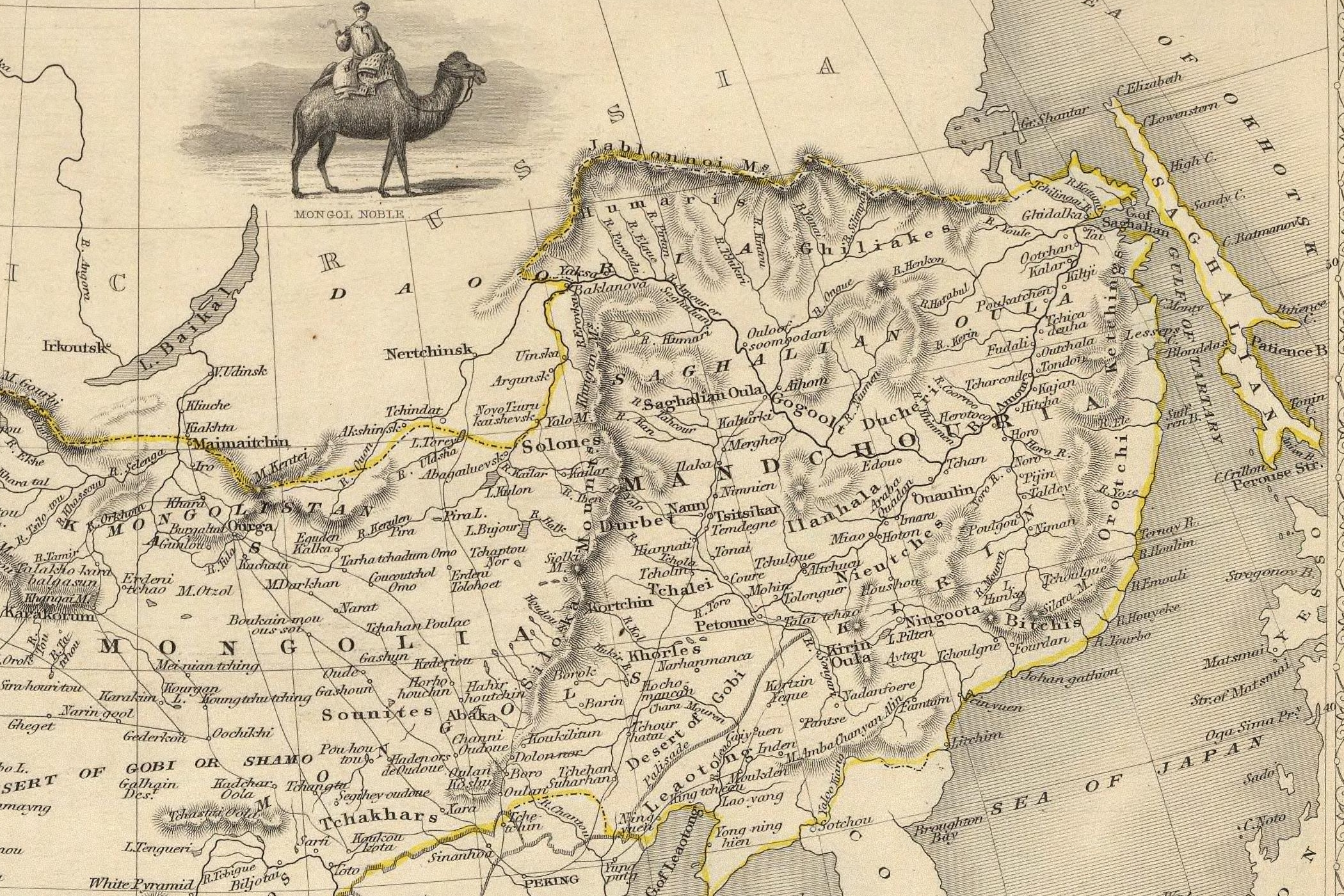
1851 map Manchuria during the Qing dynasty. Manchuria is delimited by the Yablonoi range in the north, the Greater Khingan in the west, and the Pacific coast in the east. In the south the Yalu River separates Manchuria from the Korean Peninsula.

Manchuria is a region in East Asia. Depending on the definition of its extent, Manchuria can refer either to a region falling entirely within present-day China, or to a larger region today divided between Northeast China and the Russian Far East. To differentiate between the two parts following the latter definition, the Russian part is also known as Outer Manchuria (or Russian Manchuria), while the Chinese part is known as Northeast China.

Manchuria is the homeland of the Manchu people. "Manchu" is a name introduced by Hong Taiji of the Qing dynasty in 1636 for the Jurchen people, a Tungusic people.

The population grew from about 1 million in 1750 to 5 million in 1850 and to 14 million in 1900, largely because of the immigration of Han farmers.

Lying at the juncture of the Chinese, Japanese and Russian spheres of influence, Manchuria has been a hotbed of conflict since the late-19th century. The Russian Empire established control over the northern part of Manchuria in 1860 (Beijing Treaty); it built (1897–1902) the Chinese Eastern Railway to consolidate its control. Disputes over Manchuria and Korea led to the Russo-Japanese War of 1904–1905. The Japanese invaded Manchuria in 1931, setting up the puppet state of Manchukuo which became a centerpiece of the fast-growing Empire of Japan. The Soviet invasion of Manchuria in August 1945 led to the rapid collapse of Japanese rule, and the Soviets restored the region of Manchuria to Chinese rule: Manchuria served as a base of operations for the Mao Zedong's People's Liberation Army in the Chinese Civil War, which led to the formation of the People's Republic of China in 1949. In the Korean War of 1950–1953, Chinese forces used Manchuria as a base to assist North Korea against the United Nations Command forces. During the Sino–Soviet split Manchuria became a matter of contention, escalating to the Sino–Soviet border conflict in 1969. The Sino-Russian border dispute was resolved diplomatically only in 2004.

In recent years scholars have studied 20th-century Manchuria extensively, while paying less attention to the earlier period.

== Prehistory ==
Neolithic sites located in the region of Manchuria are represented by the Xinglongwa culture, Xinle culture and Hongshan culture.

== Early history ==
=== Antiquity to Tang dynasty ===
The earliest documented residents in what later became known as Manchuria were the Sushen, Donghu and Gojoseon peoples. Around 300 BC, the state of Yan expanded into what is now Liaoning province, establishing the commanderies of Liaoxi and Liaodong.

After the fall of Yan, the region was successively ruled by the Qin, Han, and Jin dynasties and then various Xianbei states during the Sixteen Kingdoms era. Meanwhile, the kingdoms of Buyeo and Goguryeo were established to the north, at times controlling large territories of the region.

Manchuria was the homeland of several Tungusic ethnic groups, including the Ulchs and Nani. Various ethnic groups and their respective kingdoms, including the Xianbei, Wuhuan, Mohe and Khitan have risen to power in Manchuria.

=== Balhae ===
From 698 to 926, the kingdom of Balhae ruled over all of Manchuria, including the northern Korean Peninsula and Primorsky Krai. Balhae was composed predominantly of Goguryeo language and Tungusic-speaking peoples (Mohe people), and was an early feudal medieval state of Eastern Asia, which developed its industry, agriculture, animal husbandry, and had its own cultural traditions and art. People of Balhae maintained political, economic and cultural contacts with both Silla and the Tang dynasty, as well as Japan.

Northeastern Manchuria in today's Primorsky Krai was settled at this moment by northern Mohe tribes. It was incorporated to the Balhae Kingdom under King Seon's reign (818–830) and put Balhae territory at its height. After subduing the Yulou Mohe (Hanzi: 虞婁靺鞨 pinyin: Yúlóu Mòhé) first and the Yuexi Mohe (Hanzi: 越喜靺鞨 pinyin: Yuèxǐ Mòhé) thereafter, King Seon administered their territories by creating four prefectures : Solbin Prefecture (率宾府), Jeongli Prefecture (定理府), Anbyeon Prefecture (安邊府) and Anwon Prefecture (安遠府).

=== Liao and Jin dynasties ===
With the Song dynasty to the south, the Khitan people of Western Manchuria, who probably spoke a language related to the Mongolic languages, created the Liao dynasty in Inner and Outer Mongolia and conquered the region of Manchuria, and went on to control the adjacent part of the Sixteen Prefectures in Northern China as well.

In the early 12th century the Tungusic Jurchen people (the ancestors of the later Manchu people), who originally lived in the forests in the eastern borderlands of the Liao Empire and were Liao's tributaries, overthrew the Liao and formed the Jin dynasty. They went on to control parts of Northern China and Mongolia after a series of successful military campaigns. Most of the surviving Khitan either assimilated into the bulk of the Han and Jurchen populations, or moved to Central Asia. However, according to DNA tests conducted by Liu Fengzhu of the Nationalities Research Institute of the Chinese Academy of Social Sciences, the Daur people, still living in northern Manchuria (northeast China 东北), are also descendants of the Khitans.

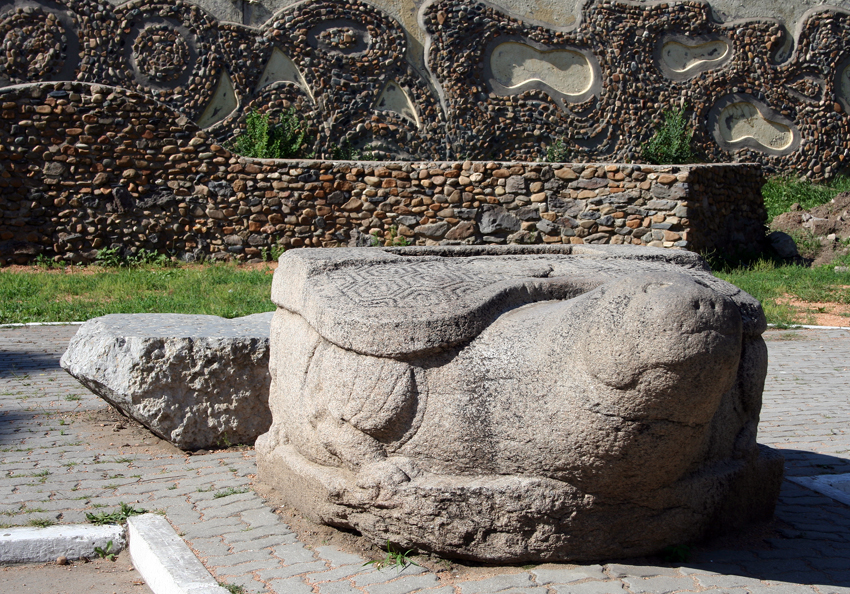
A 12th-century Jin dynasty stone tortoise in today's Ussuriysk

The first Jin capital, Shangjing, located on the Ashi River within modern Harbin, was originally not much more than a city of tents, but in 1124 the second Jin emperor Wanyan Wuqimai starting a major construction project, had his ethnic Han chief architect, Lu Yanlun, build a new city at this site, emulating, on a smaller scale, the Northern Song capital Bianjing (Kaifeng). When Bianjing fell to Jin troops in 1127, thousands of captured Song aristocrats (including the two Song emperors), scholars, craftsmen and entertainers, along with the treasures of the Song capital, were all taken to Shangjing (the Upper Capital) by the winners.

Although the Jin ruler Wanyan Liang, spurred on by his aspirations to become the ruler of a unified China, moved the Jin capital from Shangjing to Yanjing (now Beijing) in 1153, and had the Shangjing palaces destroyed in 1157, the city regained a degree of significance under Wanyan Liang's successor, Emperor Shizong, who enjoyed visiting the region to get in touch with his Jurchen roots.

The capital of the Jin, Zhongdu, was captured by the Mongols in 1215 at the Battle of Zhongdu. The Jin then moved their capital to Kaifeng, which fell to Mongols in 1233. In 1234, the Jin dynasty collapsed after the siege of Caizhou. The last emperor of the Jin, Emperor Mo, was killed while fighting the Mongols who had breached the walls of the city. Days earlier, his predecessor, Emperor Aizong, committed suicide because he was unable to escape the besieged city.

=== Mongols and the Yuan dynasty ===
In 1211, after the conquest of Western Xia, Genghis Khan mobilized an army to conquer the Jin dynasty. His general Jebe and brother Qasar were ordered to reduce the Jurchen cities in Manchuria. They successfully destroyed the Jin forts there. The Khitans under Yelü Liuge declared their allegiance to Genghis Khan and established the nominally autonomous Eastern Liao dynasty in Manchuria in 1213. However, the Jin forces dispatched a punitive expedition against them. Jebe went there again and the Mongols pushed out the Jins.

The Jin general, Puxian Wannu, rebelled against the Jin dynasty and founded the kingdom of Eastern Xia in Dongjing (Liaoyang) in 1215. He assumed the title Tianwang (天王; lit. Heavenly King) and the era name Tiantai (天泰). Puxian Wannu allied with the Mongols in order to secure his position. However, he revolted in 1222 after that and fled to an island while the Mongol army invaded Liaoxi, Liaodong, and Khorazm. As a result of an internal strife among the Khitans, they failed to accept Yelü Liuge's rule and revolted against the Mongol Empire. Fearing of the Mongol pressure, those Khitans fled to Goryeo without permission. But they were defeated by the Mongol-Korean alliance. Genghis Khan (1206–1227) gave his brothers and Muqali Chinese districts in Manchuria.

Ögedei Khan's son Güyük crushed the Eastern Xia dynasty in 1233, pacifying southern Manchuria. Some time after 1234 Ögedei also subdued the Tungusic peoples in northern part of the region and began to receive falcons, harems and furs as taxation. The Mongols suppressed the Tungus rebellion in 1237. In Manchuria and Siberia, the Mongols used dogsled relays for their yam. The capital city Karakorum directly controlled Manchuria until the 1260s.

During the Yuan dynasty (1271–1368), established by Kublai Khan by renaming his empire to "Great Yuan" in 1271, Manchuria was administered under the Liaoyang province. Descendants of Genghis Khan's brothers such as Belgutei and Hasar ruled the area under the Great Khans. The Mongols eagerly adopted new artillery and technologies. The world's earliest known firearm is the Heilongjiang hand cannon, dated 1288, which was found in Mongol-held Manchuria.

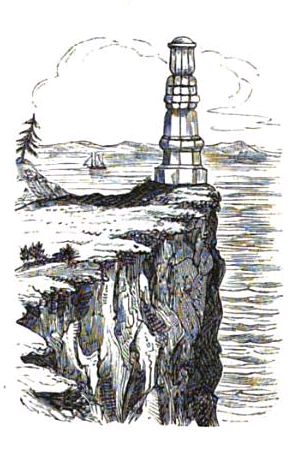
The Tyr Cliff, with a Ming (or maybe even Yuan?) column, as seen by Russian artist Permikin in the 1850s

After the expulsion of the Mongols from China proper, the Jurchen clans remained loyal to Toghan Temür, the last Yuan emperor. In 1375, Naghachu, a Mongol commander of the Northern Yuan dynasty in Liaoyang province invaded Liaodong with aims of restoring the Mongols to power. Although he continued to hold southern Manchuria, Naghachu finally surrendered to the Ming dynasty in 1387. In order to protect the northern border areas the Ming decided to "pacify" the Jurchens in order to deal with its problems with Yuan remnants along its northern border. The Ming solidified control only under Yongle Emperor (1402–1424).

=== Ming dynasty ===
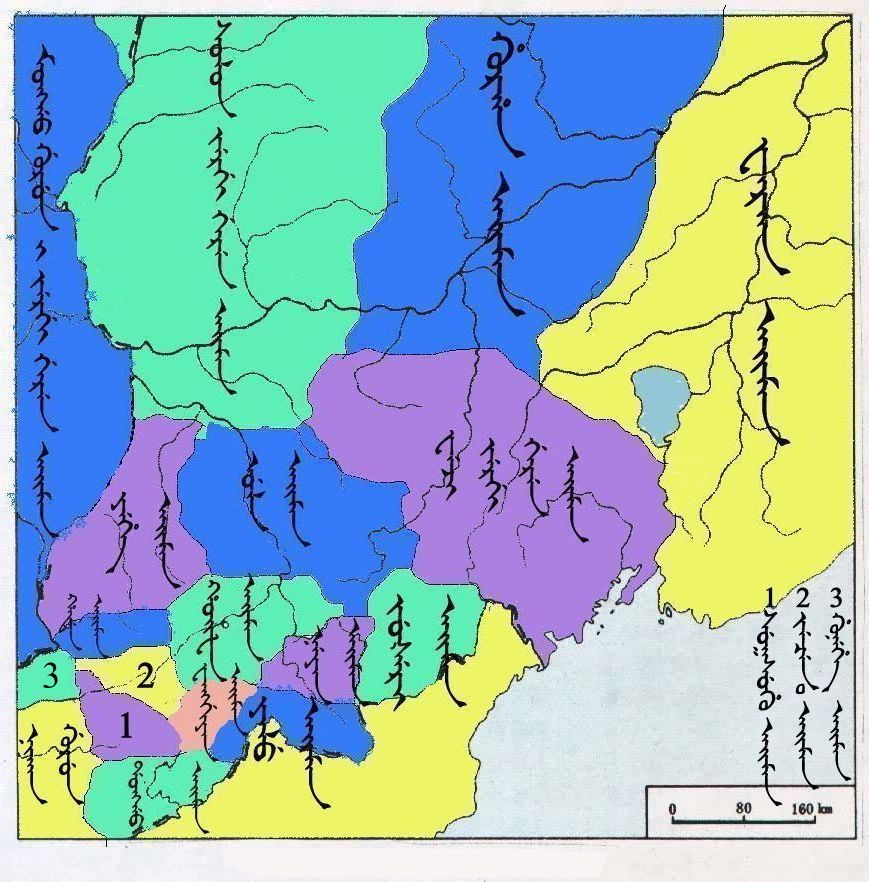
The locations of Jurchen tribes in 1600s.

The Ming dynasty took control of Liaoning in 1371, just three years after the expulsion of the Mongols from Beijing. During the reign of the Yongle Emperor in the early 15th century, efforts were made to expand Chinese control throughout entire Manchuria by establishing the Nurgan Regional Military Commission. Mighty river fleets were built in Jilin City, and sailed several times between 1409 and ca. 1432, commanded by the eunuch Yishiha down the Songhua and the Amur all the way to the mouth of the Amur, getting the chieftains of the local tribes to swear allegiance to the Ming rulers.

Soon after the death of the Yongle Emperor the expansion policy of the Ming was replaced with that of retrenchment in southern Manchuria (Liaodong). Around 1442, a defence wall was constructed to defend the northwestern frontier of Liaodong from a possible threat from the Jurchen-Mongol Oriyanghan. In 1467–68 the wall was expanded to protect the region from the northeast as well, against attacks from Jianzhou Jurchens. Although similar in purpose to the Great Wall of China, this "Liaodong Wall" was of a simpler design. While stones and tiles were used in some parts, most of the wall was in fact simply an earthen dike with moats on both sides.

Chinese cultural and religious influence such as Chinese New Year, the "Chinese god", Chinese motifs like the dragon, spirals, scrolls, and material goods like agriculture, husbandry, heating, iron cooking pots, silk, and cotton spread among the Amur natives like the Udeghes, Ulchis, and Nanais.

Starting in the 1580s, a Jianzhou Jurchens chieftain Nurhaci (1558–1626), originally based in the Hurha River valley northeast of the Ming Liaodong Wall, started to unify Jurchen tribes of the region. Over the next several decades, the Jurchen (later to be called Manchu), took control over most of Manchuria, the cities of the Ming Liaodong falling to the Jurchen one after another. In 1616, Nurhaci declared himself a khan, and founded the Later Jin dynasty (which his successors renamed in 1636 to Qing dynasty).

=== Qing dynasty ===
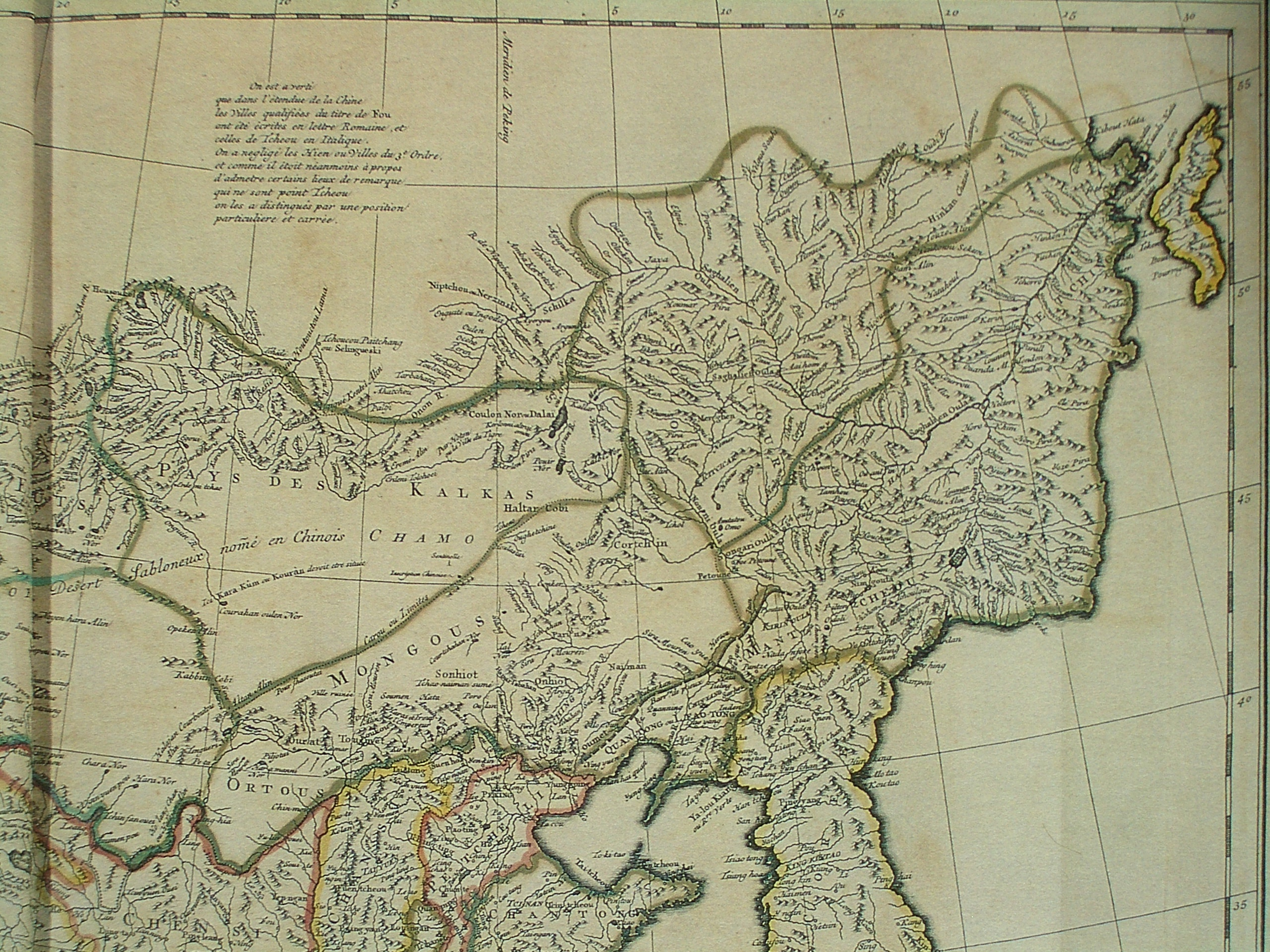
Northeastern part of the map of China and Chinese Tartary (1735; based on the French Jesuit expedition of 1709)

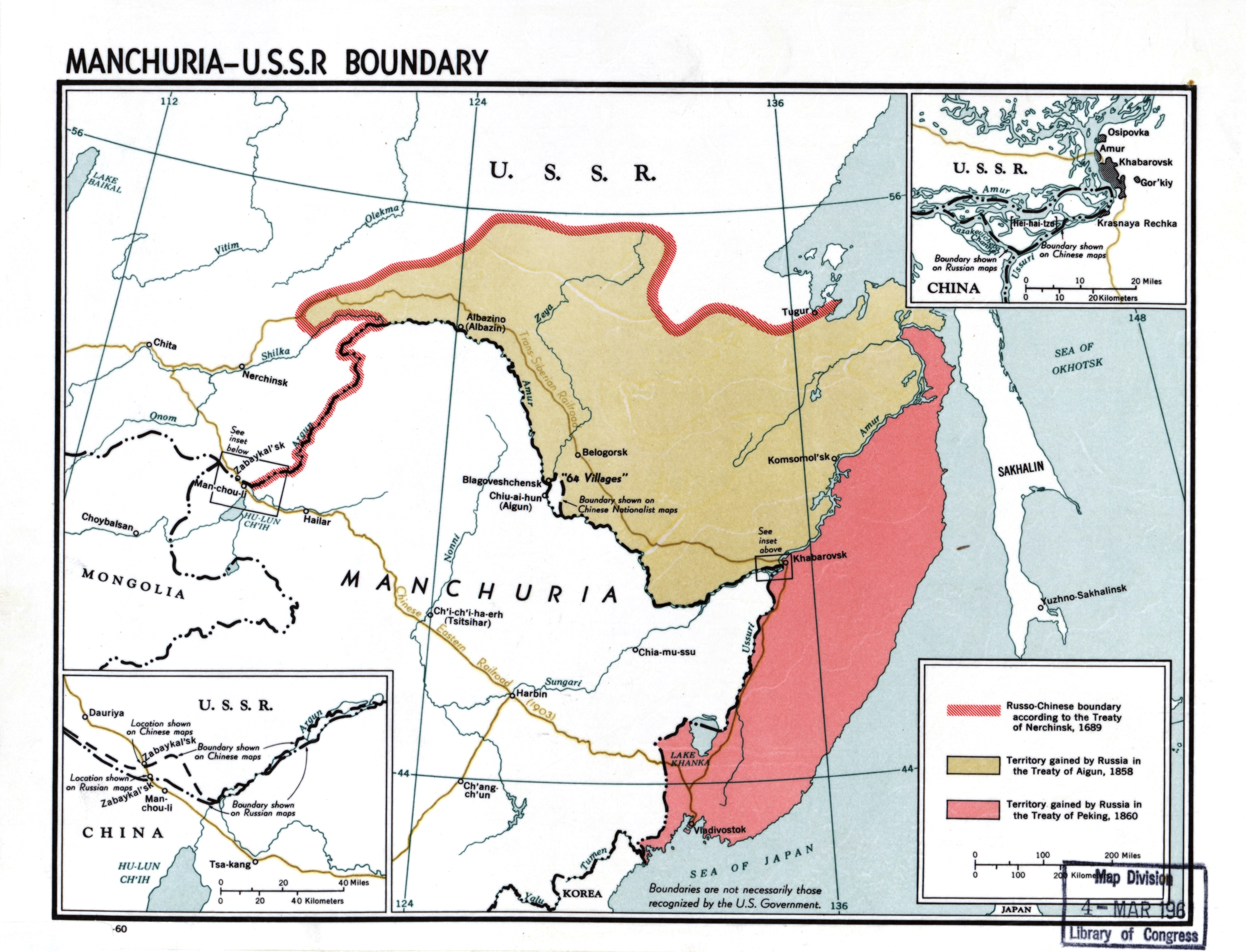
Map showing the original border (in pink) between Manchuria and Russia according to the Treaty of Nerchinsk 1689, and subsequent loss of territory to Russia in the treaties of Aigun 1858 (beige) and Peking 1860 (red)

The process of unification of the Jurchen people completed by Nurhaci was followed by his son's, Hong Taiji, energetic expansion into what became Outer Manchuria. The conquest of the Amur basin people was completed after the defeat of the Evenk chief Bombogor, in 1640.

In 1644, the Qing dynasty took Beijing and went on to conquer all of China proper. As the ancestral land of the Qing rulers, Manchuria was accorded a special status within the Qing Empire. The Eight Banners system involved military units originated in Manchuria and was used as a form of government.

During the Qing dynasty, the area of Manchuria was known as the "three eastern provinces" (東三省, dong san sheng) since 1683 when Jilin and Heilongjiang were separated even though it was not until 1907 that they were turned into actual provinces. The area of Manchuria was then converted into three provinces by the late Qing government in 1907.

For decades the Qing rulers tried to prevent large-scale immigration of Han people, but they failed and the southern parts developed agricultural and social patterns similar to those of North China. Manchuria's population grew from about 1 million in 1750 to 5 million in 1850 and 14 million in 1900, largely because of the immigration of Han farmers. The Manchus became a small element in their homeland, although they retained political control until 1900.

The region was separated from China proper by the Inner Willow Palisade, a ditch and embankment planted with willows intended to restrict the movement of the Han people into Manchuria during the Qing dynasty, as the area was off-limits to the Han until the Qing started colonizing the area with them later on in the dynasty's rule. This movement of the Han people to Manchuria is called Chuang Guandong. The Manchu area was still separated from modern-day Inner Mongolia by the Outer Willow Palisade, which kept the Manchu and the Mongols separate.

However, the Qing rule saw a massive increase of Han settlement, both legal and illegal, in Manchuria. As Manchu landlords needed the Han peasants to rent their land and grow grain, most Han migrants were not evicted. During the 18th century, Han peasants farmed 500,000 hectares of privately owned land in Manchuria and 203,583 hectares of lands which were part of courier stations, noble estates, and banner lands, in garrisons and towns in Manchuria the Han people made up 80% of the population. Han farmers were resettled from north China by the Qing to the area along the Liao River in order to restore the land to cultivation.

To the north, the boundary with Russian Siberia was fixed by the Treaty of Nerchinsk (1689) as running along the watershed of the Stanovoy Mountains. South of the Stanovoy Mountains, the basin of the Amur and its tributaries belonged to the Qing Empire. North of the Stanovoy Mountains, the Uda Valley and Siberia belonged to the Russian Empire. In 1858, a weakening Qing Empire was forced to cede Manchuria north of the Amur to Russia under the Treaty of Aigun; however, Qing subjects were allowed to continue to reside, under the Qing authority, in a small region on the now-Russian side of the river, known as the Sixty-Four Villages East of the River.

In 1860, at the Convention of Peking, the Russians managed to annex a further large slice of Manchuria, east of the Ussuri River. As a result, Manchuria was divided into a Russian half known as Outer Manchuria, and a remaining Chinese half known as Manchuria. In modern literature, "Manchuria" usually refers to the Chinese part of Manchuria. (cf. Inner and Outer Mongolia). As a result of the Treaties of Aigun and Peking, China lost access to the Sea of Japan. The Qing government began to actively encourage Han subjects to move into Manchuria since then.

The Manza War in 1868 was the first attempt by Russia to expel Chinese subjects of various ethnicities from territory it controlled. Hostilities broke out around Vladivostok when the Russians tried to shut off gold mining operations and expel Chinese workers there. The Chinese resisted a Russian attempt to take Askold Island and in response, 2 Russian military stations and 3 Russian towns were attacked by the Chinese, and the Russians failed to oust the Chinese. However, the Russians finally managed it from them in 1892

== History after 1860 ==
By the 19th century, along with other frontier territories of the Qing dynasty such as Mongolia and Tibet, Manchuria came under the influence of Japan and the European powers as the Qing dynasty grew weaker.

=== Russian and Japanese encroachment ===
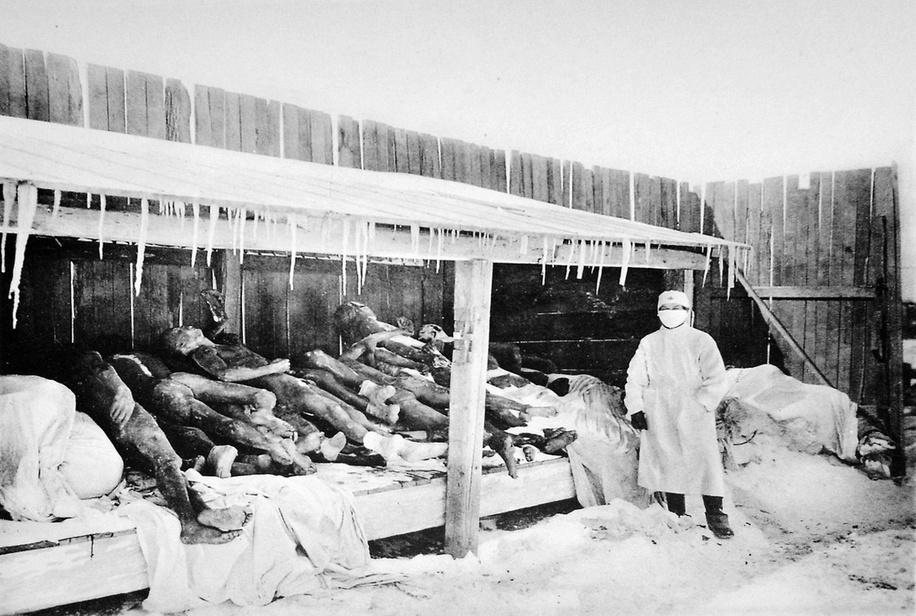
Picture of Manchurian Plague victims in 1910-1911

Manchuria also came under Russian influence with the building of the Chinese Eastern Railway through Harbin to Vladivostok. Poor Korean farmers moved there. In Chuang Guandong many Han farmers, mostly of them from Shandong peninsula moved there, attracted by cheap farmland that was ideal for growing soybeans.

During the Boxer Rebellion in 1899–1900, Russian soldiers killed ten thousand Chinese (Manchu, Han and Daur peoples) living in Blagoveshchensk and Sixty-Four Villages East of the River. In revenge, the Chinese Honghuzi conducted guerilla warfare against the Russian occupation of Manchuria and sided with Japan against Russia during the Russo-Japanese War.

Japan replaced Russian influence in the southern half of Manchuria as a result of the Russo-Japanese War in 1904–1905. Most of the southern branch of the Chinese Eastern Railway (the section from Changchun to Port Arthur (Japanese: Ryojun) was transferred from Russia to Japan, and became the South Manchurian Railway. Jiandao (in the region bordering Korea), was handed over to Qing dynasty as a compensation for the South Manchurian Railway.

From 1911 to 1931 Manchuria was nominally part of the Republic of China. In practice it was under Japan domination, which exerted influence through local warlords.

Japanese influence extended into Outer Manchuria in the wake of the Russian Revolution of 1917, but Outer Manchuria came under Soviet control by 1925. Japan took advantage of the disorder following the Russian Revolution to occupy Outer Manchuria, but Soviet successes and American economic pressure forced Japanese withdrawal.

In the 1920s Harbin was flooded with 100,000 to 200,000 Russian white émigrés fleeing from Russia. Harbin held the largest Russian population outside of the state of Russia.

It was reported that among Banner people, both Manchu and Han in Aihun, Heilongjiang in the 1920s, would seldom marry with Han civilians, but they (Manchu and Han Bannermen) would mostly intermarry with each other. Owen Lattimore reported that, during his January 1930 visit to Manchuria, he studied a community in Jilin (Kirin), where both Manchu and Han bannermen were settled at a town called Wulakai, and eventually the Han Bannermen there could not be differentiated from Manchus since they were effectively Manchufied. The Han civilian population was in the process of absorbing and mixing with them when Lattimore wrote his article.

Manchuria was (and still is) an important region for its rich mineral and coal reserves, and its soil is perfect for soy and barley production. For Japan, Manchuria became an essential source of raw materials.

=== Korean invasion of Manchuria ===
When Russian troops captured Manchuria during the Boxer Rebellion, Korea saw this as an opportunity to settle its border disputes with the Qing by invading Manchuria. South of the Tumen River, Korea established Jinwidae. A police force. Korea sent a battalion of 150 soldiers to Jongseung, 200 to Musan County, 200 to Hoeryong, 100 more to Jongseung, 100 to Onsong County and 50 to Kyongwon County. Jinwidae's border defenses were so tight that the Qing officials could not control the Koreans. When police forces were stationed in Jiandao, the purpose of Jinwidae was changed to border protection.

The police station was established in March 1901. Two hundred policemen were stationed in Jiandao. The police station divided Jiandao into five subdivisions: North Jiandao, Jongseong Jiandao, Hoeryong Jiandao, Musan Jiandao, and Gyeongwon Jiandao. In 1902, Korea sent Yi Bum-yun to Jiandao as an observer to strengthen its control over the area.

Realizing it was impossible to protect the Koreans without force, Yi raised a volunteer army. From September 1903, Yi began to build up an armed force, digging extensive trenches between Bongcheon (now Shenyang), Manchuria, Jilin, and Jiandao. He employed Russian instructors to train the army and bought 500 rifles from Seoul. The Korean government supported Yi's volunteer army because of Gojong's desire to control Jiandao and Yi Yong-ik's support. According to a Qing official, the violence of the Korean army was as follows. On 4 September 1903, 1,000 Korean soldiers crossed the Yalu River. These Korean soldiers burned and looted Chinese territory across the Yalu River. On 2 October 1903, 700-800 Korean soldiers broke into a county office in Linjiang. To avoid further conflict with China, the Korean government summoned Yi in 1904. Yi refused to obey the Korean government's order and instead led his troops to Primorsky Krai, where he joined many Korean independence activists such as Choe Jae-hyeong and An Jung-geun.

After the invasion, the Koreans began to regard Jiandao as Korean territory. For example, the 1907 map of Korea included Jiandao as Korean territory. However, in the early 20th century the Empire of Japan gained increasing influence in Korea, and the Japan–Korea Treaty of 1905 deprived Korea of its diplomatic sovereignty and gave full authority over all aspects of Korea's foreign relations to the Japanese Foreign Office. Professor Yi Tae-jin of Seoul University claimed that the Koreans regarded the Japanese interference as an invasion because the Japanese and Russians were fighting in the Russo-Japanese War. When Japan began interfering in the Manchuria border, the Korean Daily News which once referred to Jiandao as Korean territory changed its position. The dispute ended with the Gando Convention (signed by China and Japan in 1909), which recognized the Chinese claim to Jiandao (Gando). Korea was annexed by Japan in the following year with the Japan–Korea Treaty of 1910.

=== 1931 Japanese invasion and Manchukuo ===
Map of the Manchukuo state in 1939

Around the time of World War I, Zhang Zuolin, a former bandit (Honghuzi) established himself as a powerful warlord with influence over most of Manchuria. He was inclined to keep his army under his control and to keep Manchuria free of foreign influence. The Japanese tried and failed to assassinate him in 1916. They finally succeeded in June 1928.

Following the Mukden Incident in 1931 and the subsequent Japanese invasion of Manchuria, Manchuria was proclaimed to be Manchukuo, a puppet state under the control of the Japanese army. The last Qing emperor, Puyi, was then placed on the throne to lead a Japanese puppet government in the Wei Huang Gong, better known as "Puppet Emperor's Palace". Manchuria was thus detached from China by Japan to create a buffer zone to defend Japan from Russia's Southing Strategy and, with Japanese investment and rich natural resources, became an industrial domination. Under Japanese control Manchuria was one of the most brutally run regions in the world, with a systematic campaign of terror and intimidation against the local Russian and Chinese populations including arrests, organised riots and other forms of subjugation. The Japanese also began a campaign of emigration to Manchukuo; the Japanese population there rose from 240,000 in 1931 to 837,000 in 1939 (the Japanese had a plan to bring in 5 million Japanese settlers into Manchukuo). Hundreds of Manchu farmers were evicted and their farms given to Japanese immigrant families. Manchukuo was used as a base to invade the rest of China in 1937–40.

At the end of the 1930s, Manchuria was a trouble spot with Japan, clashing twice with the Soviet Union. These clashes - at Lake Khasan in 1938 and at Khalkhin Gol one year later - resulted in many Japanese casualties. The Soviet Union won these two battles and a peace agreement was signed. However, the regional unrest endured.

=== After World War II ===
After the atomic bombing of Hiroshima in August 1945, the Soviet Union invaded from Soviet Outer Manchuria as part of its declaration of war against Japan. From 1945 to 1948, Manchuria was a base area for the Chinese People's Liberation Army in the Chinese Civil War. With the encouragement of the Soviet Union, Manchuria was used as a staging ground during the Chinese Civil War for the Chinese Communist Party, which emerged victorious in 1949.

During the Korean War of the 1950s, 300,000 soldiers of the Chinese People's Liberation Army crossed the Sino-Korean border from Manchuria to repulse UN forces led by the United States from North Korea.

In the 1960s, Manchuria's border with the Soviet Union became the site of the most serious tension between the Soviet Union and China. The treaties of 1858 and 1860, which ceded territory north of the Amur, were ambiguous as to which course of the river was the boundary. This ambiguity led to dispute over the political status of several islands. This led to armed conflict in 1969, called the Sino-Soviet border conflict.

With the end of the Cold War, this boundary issue was discussed through negotiations. In 2004, Russia agreed to transfer Yinlong Island and one half of Heixiazi Island to China, ending an enduring border dispute. Both islands are found at the confluence of the Amur and Ussuri Rivers, and were until then administered by Russia and claimed by China. The event was meant to foster feelings of reconciliation and cooperation between the two countries by their leaders, but it has also provoked different degrees of dissent on both sides. Russians, especially Cossack farmers of Khabarovsk, who would lose their ploughlands on the islands, were unhappy about the apparent loss of territory. Meanwhile, some Chinese have criticised the treaty as an official acknowledgement of the legitimacy of Russian rule over Outer Manchuria, which was ceded by the Qing dynasty to Imperial Russia under a series of what the Chinese side called Unequal Treaties, which included the Treaty of Aigun in 1858 and the Convention of Peking in 1860, in order to exchange exclusive usage of Russia's rich oil resources. The transfer was carried out on October 14, 2008.
