= Anti-Korean sentiment in China =

Anti-Korean sentiment in China refers to expressions of hostility, negative stereotyping, or distrust directed toward Korean people, Korean culture, or the governments of South Korea and North Korea within segments of Chinese society. In Chinese-language discourse, such attitudes are sometimes described as 嫌韩 (xián Hán; “dislike of Korea”) or 嫌韩情绪 (“anti-Korea sentiment").

Since the establishment of Diplomatic relations between the People's Republic of China and the Republic of Korea in 1992, economic and cultural ties have expanded significantly, even as historical disputes, security issues, and nationalist controversies have periodically contributed to tensions and were established in 1992. Since normalization, bilateral economic, political, and cultural ties have expanded significantly, contributing to increased economic integration between the two states. At the same time, periodic disputes, including controversies over historical interpretation and regional security issues, have contributed to fluctuations in public opinion and recurring tensions in bilateral relations.

South Korea established official relations with the People's Republic of China in 1992, and relations between the two states have, for some time, slowly improved to allow more economic integration, but tension still exists between the two states.

Within the Chinese population, Korean culture has become popular in the 21st century. Amid a higher degree of interaction between the two countries in terms of politics and culture, however, there is still some looming anti-South Korean sentiment arising from various disputes between the two countries.

== Political causes and incidents ==
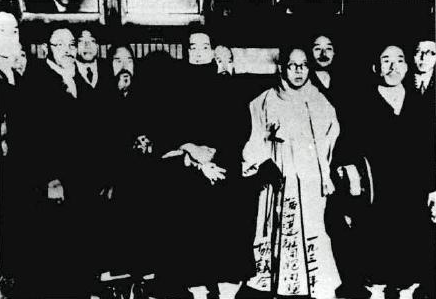
Koreans affected by the 1931 Wanpaoshan Incident

Following its colonization of Korea, Japan encouraged many Koreans to work or settle in Manchuria as part of its continental policy. Conflicts such as the Wanpaoshan Incident arose between Korean workers and local Chinese, sensationalized by Japanese reporting amid escalating tensions. Some Republic of China officials and members of the public suspected ethnic Koreans of helping Japan.

Japanese invasion of Manchuria also led many Korean exiles to join the Chinese Communist Party (CCP). The formation of the ill-fated pro-Japan organization Minsaengdan by some Koreans however created a rift within the CCP. Over a thousand Korean CCP members, including future North Korean leader Kim Il Sung, were subsequently purged, with about 500 killed, on suspicion of working with the Japanese.

During the Cultural Revolution, Mao Zedong and North Korea (DPRK), which increasingly sided with the Soviet Union against China, denounced each other as revisionist. The Korean language was labeled as part of the "Four Olds," texts in Korean were burned, and bilingual education was suppressed. Ethnic Koreans were suspected of being more loyal to North Korea than China. According to Julia Lovell, in the frontier town of Yanbian, "freight trains trundled from China into the DPRK, draped with the corpses of Koreans killed in the pitched battles of the Cultural Revolution, and daubed with threatening graffiti: 'This will be your fate also, you tiny revisionists!'"

== Historiographical disputes ==
Academic debates surrounding Goguryeo and Balhae have led to anti-Korean sentiments in China. Contentious topics in the debates include the ethnicity of the ruling class in both states and to which country their histories belong.

== Modern sports ==
=== Football ===
Konghanzheng (Chinese: 恐韩症), a term coined by Chinese football fans, refers to a persistent phenomenon where the China national team has played about 30 matches against the South Korea national football team since 1978 but has never been able to beat them. Frustration has possibly led to several violent outbreaks against South Koreans in football games hosted in China, such as the Olympic preliminary match in 1999, the friendship match in 2001, and another Olympics preliminary match in 2004.

In a Korea-China friendship football match held in Beijing in 2000, South Korean spectators were violently beaten by Chinese spectators as the Chinese team lost. In 2004 during an Athens Olympics football preliminary match held in Changsha, Chinese spectators responded with violence as the Chinese team lost, resulting in the injury of one Korean spectator.

During the 2002 FIFA World Cup hosted in Korea and Japan, the incidents surrounding the Korean team's matches were well-known, and they would become a popular topic for some Chinese to bear sentiments of disapproval against South Korea, while certain Chinese media have reported negatively on the Korean side's demeanor. As the South Korean team progressed through the tournament to the semi-finals, it was evident that the South Korean team won surprisingly against strong European teams like Italy and Spain because of unfair play and preferential treatment due to a number of controversial judgments by the referees.

Anti-South Korean sentiment was also apparent among ordinary people in China. It has been reported that ethnic Koreans in China were afraid of openly cheering for Korean teams due to hostility from local Chinese.

=== 2007 Asian Winter Games ===
During the 2007 Asian Winter Games held in Changchun, a group of South Korean athletes held up signs during the award ceremony that contained text that read "Mount Baekdu is our territory." Chinese sports officials delivered a letter of protest to criticize that those political activities violated the spirit of the Olympics. This incident has become a source for anti-Korea sentiment in China.

=== 2008 Beijing Olympics ===
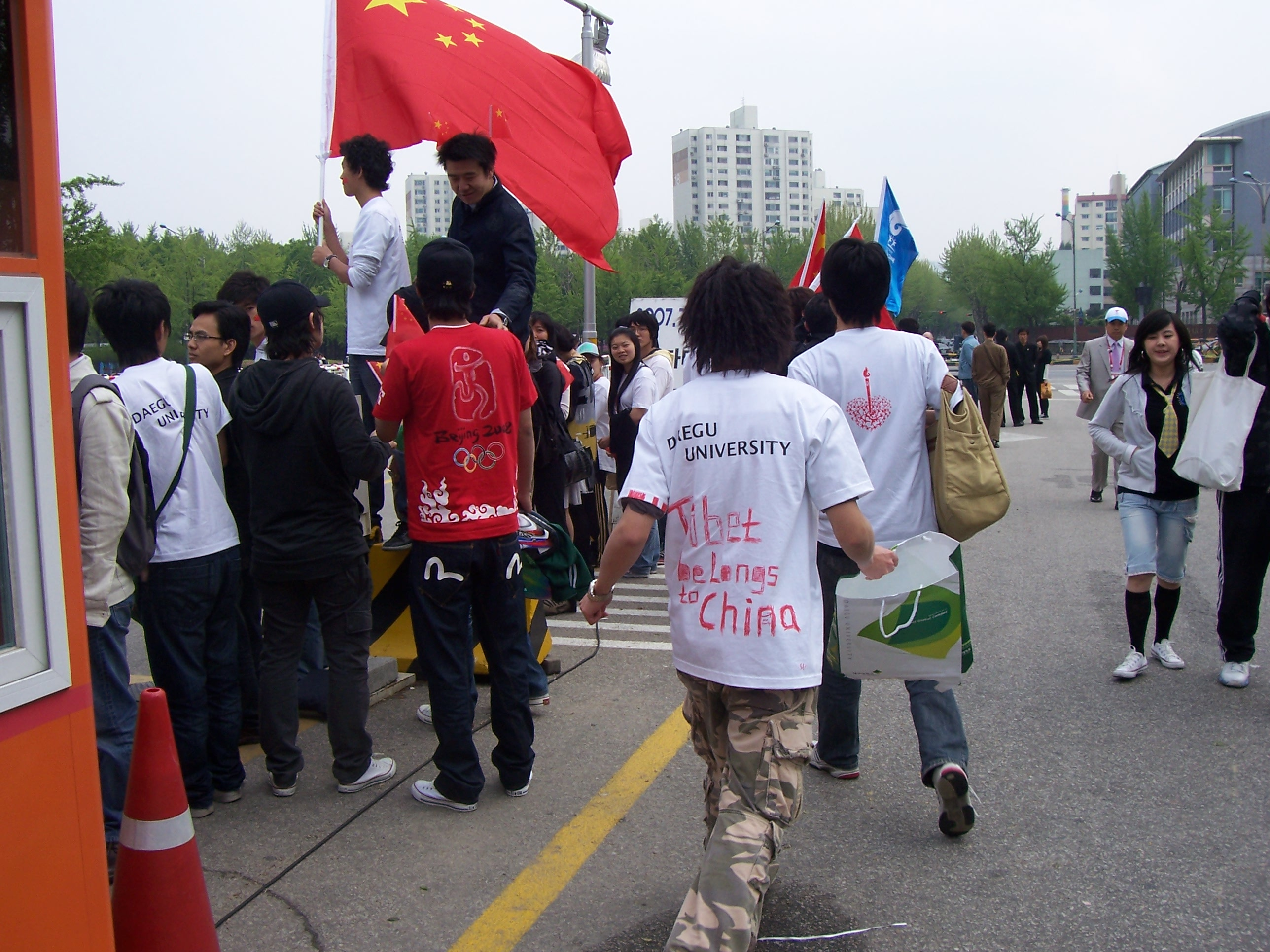
A young man at the relay in Seoul wearing a Daegu University shirt with the phrase "Tibet belongs to China" written on it

Those sentiments in China, along with similar anti-Chinese sentiments in Korea, became more prominent as a result of the 2008 Beijing Olympics. During the Seoul leg of the 2008 Olympic torch relay, Chinese students clashed with protesters. Numerous projectiles were thrown towards the South Korean protesters, injuring one newspaper reporter. Chinese supporters of the Beijing Olympics also engaged in mob violence, notably in the lobby of Seoul Plaza Hotel, against South Korean protesters, Tibetans, Western tourists, and police officers. This generated a strong statement of regret from the South Korean government to China and fanned a surge of anti-Chinese protests in Korean Internet portals.

Further controversy was generated when Seoul Broadcasting System (SBS) leaked footage of rehearsals of the 2008 Beijing Olympics opening ceremony. A Beijing Olympic official expressed his disappointment over the leakage. This incident has been widely reported in the Chinese media, as can be seen as the impetus to the dislike and distrust towards South Koreans among Chinese.

Throughout the events, the Chinese spectators often booed the South Korean athletes and cheered for competing nations, and these even included Japan. These attitudes were widely reported within the South Korean media; however, the issue which became the subject of most attention was that Chinese spectators chose to cheer for Japanese athletes when competing against South Korea, an action previously seen as taboo in earlier years as a result of Anti-Japanese sentiment in China. Analysts in China and abroad claim that Chinese are supporting Japanese players in return for their goodwill gestures towards China, noting a notable improvement in relations, which were previously fraught with arguments regarding topics such as World War II atrocities.

=== 2018 FIFA World Cup qualification ===
During the 2018 FIFA World Cup qualification, anti-Korean sentiment was exposed once again when South Korea and China faced each other to qualify for the 2018 FIFA World Cup. The sentiment came largely from the THAAD factor; when South Korea decided to install THAAD in the country, China viewed it as threatening its sovereignty and unleashed an anti-Korean boycott, which led to the revival of anti-Korean sentiment in China. Thus, the World Cup match between two countries got huge attention, as China managed to overcome South Korea 1–0 in a match where police had been on high alert due to tensions between the two countries.

=== 2022 Winter Olympics ===
The 2022 Winter Olympics held in Beijing saw a deterioration of the relationship between China and South Korea. During the opening ceremony, China has raised a controversy among the South Korean public as Hanbok was displayed during the ceremony. The display has caused uproar among the South Korean public and politicians, calling it "cultural appropriation." In solidarity, many South Korean celebrities uploaded pictures of themselves wearing Hanbok, the movement drew ire among Chinese nationalists, and they began attacking the Korean celebrities on the internet.

== Chinese diaspora and students ==
Another source of anti-South Korean sentiment within China originates from reports by a number of overseas Chinese students in Korea, who experienced negative attitudes of local Koreans. It is reported that they are discriminated against based on the stereotype that they are uncivilised, poor, and ignorant by Koreans.

Huang Youfu, an ethnic Korean professor at the Minzu University of China noted in 2008 that articles written by joseonjok about the discrimination in South Korea were a major source of anti-South Korean sentiment in China among netizens.

== Contemporary cultural issues ==
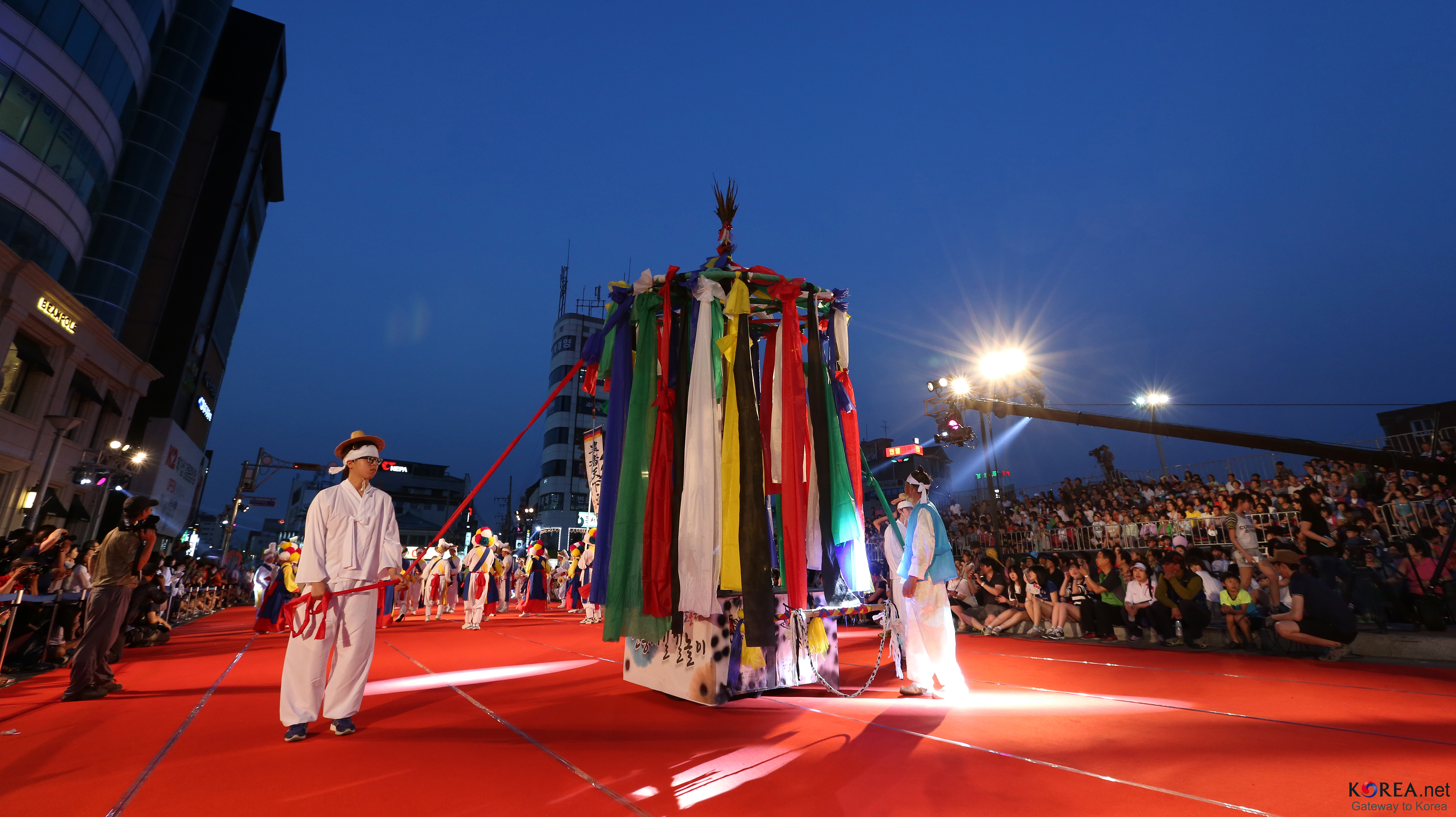
Gangneung Danoje Festival

In 2005, anti-South Korean sentiments in China became a major trend as China began disputing South Korea's attempts to register the Gangneung Danoje Festival as a UNESCO intangible cultural heritage. China claimed the Gangneung Danoje Festival derived from the Chinese Dragonboat Festival, and pursued a joint registration of the Gangneung Danoje Festival and the Chinese Dragonboat Festival.

South Korea held that the Gangneung Danoje Festival is a unique cultural tradition of Gangneung, Korea, completely different from the Chinese Dragon Boat Festival, and rejected Chinese contentions for joint registration. Despite Chinese opposition, UNESCO has registered the Gangneung Danoje Festival as an intangible cultural heritage. Upon registration, the Chinese media began making accusations of South Korea stealing Chinese culture and expressed regret and humiliation at losing the Chinese Dragon Boat Festival to South Korea.

The Chinese media and the Chinese internet responded to the UNESCO intangible heritage controversy with a series of similar allegations. In 2007, rumors from the Chinese media that South Korea is attempting to register Chinese characters at UNESCO have generated significant controversy. These reports have also spread to Hong Kong and Taiwanese media.

Influenced by these issues, South Korea was elected as the most hated country in an internet survey on Chinese netizens, according to Chinese news (国际先驱导报) in 2007. However, despite the internet debate, China's view of Korea is generally fine. One survey reports "good relations" reached 50.2% of the respondents, the "general" up to 40.8%, while "an anti-Korean sentiment" of the small proportion of respondents was only 4.4 to 6.1%.

As a result of the anti-Korean sentiment in China, several Korean companies that have gained footholds in the country have also suffered. In June 2017, for instance, South Korean automaker Hyundai experienced a 64 percent drop in sales, while its Kia division sustained a 58-percent decline. By 2018, the Lotte Group is also mulling the sale of its department stores in China, blaming the persistent wave of anti-Korean backlash.

On 13 October 2020, RM, a member of BTS, made a speech about the Korean War, where he said South Korea shared a history of pain with the United States. This caused an uproar in China, and Chinese-run media rallied to lash out at BTS for what they perceived as bias and denial of China's contribution. Chinese netizens have called to boycott anything from Korea or by Koreans, despite China fighting against South Korea at the time.

== See also ==
- Anti-Chinese sentiment in Korea
- Anti-Japanese sentiment in China
- Anti-Western sentiment in China
- Chinese nationalism
- Racism in China
- Voluntary Agency Network of Korea – It is a South Korean nationalist group that opposes "Chinese imperialism".
