= Gando Special Force =

1938–1945 Manchukuo Imperial Army unit

The Gando Special Force (GSF; Chinese: 間島特設隊; pinyin: Jiāndǎo Tèshèduì; Wade–Giles: Chien^{1}-tao^{3} T'e^{4}-she^{4}-tui^{4}; Japanese Hepburn romanization: Kantō Tokusetsutai; Korean: 간도 특설대, romanized: Gando Teugseoldae) was an independent battalion within the Manchukuo Imperial Army composed primarily of ethnic Koreans, and some experienced foreign mercenaries from Asia tasked with suppressing anti-Japanese, and pro-communist militant groups in the border areas between northern Japanese occupied Korea and Manchukuo. It operated between 1 December 1938 and 1945.

Ex-GSF soldiers/officers are regarded as chinilpa (derogatory term for collaborators with Japan) in modern Korea for their role in suppressing groups advocating Korean independence.

== History ==
The Jiandao region of Kirin province in Manchuria, known in Korean as “Gando”, was an area that had been inhabited largely by ethnic Koreans. Before the Japanese occupation of Korea in 1905, many Koreans opposed to the annexation relocated from Korea to Gando and established Korean independence movements. Many of these movements later came under the control of the Chinese Communist Party via the Northeast Anti-Japanese United Army.

From 1907, the Japanese government claimed jurisdiction over all ethnic Koreans regardless of physical location, and friction increased with the government of Qing dynasty China over control of the Gando area, cumulating in the Gando Convention of 1909. After the Manchurian Incident, and the establishment of Japanese control over all of Manchuria in 1931, another wave of Korean immigration occurred, this time with Japanese encouragement, to help cement Japanese claims on the territory.

With the establishment of Manchukuo in 1932, the situation in Gando was very unstable, with the local population rent into pro-Japanese and anti-Japanese/anti-Manchukuo factions, many of which resorted to guerrilla warfare, like the Korean Revolutionary Army. The Japanese army brutally slaughtered and committed massive rape against Yanbian Koreans in the Gando Massacre in October 1920-April 1921. In an effort to subjugate the region, the Japanese recruited pro-Japanese Korean volunteers into a special warfare force and had trained by the Manchukuo Imperial Army primarily in counterinsurgency tactics.

A number of ethnic Koreans saw better opportunities for advancement via the Manchukuo military academies than would have been impossible in the Imperial Japanese Army, and joined the new force. These included future South Korean general Paik Sun-yup. Historian Philip Jowett noted that during the Japanese occupation of Manchuria, the Gando Special Force "earned a reputation for brutality and was reported to have laid waste to large areas which came under its rule." Jowett further added that the Chinese in the area hated the Korean soldiers so much that "any men of the unit who were captured by either the Nationalists or Communists [during the war] would have received short shrift." The Gando special force lost around 400 men every year to both battle casualties and desertion, while they recruited 700 new recruits annually, meaning they expanded by a net 300 soldiers every year.

Chinese Communists during the Minsaengdan incident engaged in a brutal purge of torture and summary executions against Koreans in Yanbian suspected of collaborating with Japan and membership in the pro-Japan Minsaengdan. A series of purges resulted: over 1,000 Koreans were expelled from the CCP, including Kim Il Sung (who was arrested in late 1933 and exonerated in early 1934), and 500 were killed. In early 1932, the eastern Manchuria branch of the CCP launched an anti-Minsaengdan campaign of mass riots, arsons, and assassinations. To prove their loyalty, Korean communists pursued suspected collaborators with a particular vengeance. But as suspicion grew, any association with someone accused of having Minsaengdan ties came under attack, including Korean communists. By late 1932, the Chinese leaders of the CCP's eastern Manchuria branch began to interrogate, torture, and execute rank-and-file party members with such ties (the majority of whom were Korean). Even advocating for Korean independence from Japan could be viewed as siding with reactionary organizations like the Minsaengdan.

Chinese soldiers massacred both Japanese and Korean civilians in the Tongzhou mutiny due to Korean collaborators.

After the surrender of Japan, many members of the Gando Special Force were incorporated into the new Republic of Korea Army by the United States Army, for their training, and intimate knowledge of the terrain of the northern part of the Korean peninsula, and the tactics of the Korean People's Army. Some later rose to high positions within the government of the Republic of Korea.

In 1945 the Soviet army and Chinese soldiers both massacred Korean and Japanese soldiers and civilians during the Soviet invasion of Manchuria and Soviet invasion of North Korea. The Soviets committed massacre and rapes in their occupation zone against Japanese and Koreans. During the Soviet occupation, Soviet soldiers committed rape against both Japanese and Korean women alike. Soviet soldiers also looted the property of both Japanese and Koreans living in northern Korea.

Chinese soldiers also massacred and raped Korean civilians in Yanbian in revenge for Gando Special Force collaborating with Japan. Right after the end of the war in 1945, in Manchurian areas occupied by the National Revolutionary Army, 176 Koreans were killed, 1,866 were injured, 3,468 were detained, and 320 were raped by armed Chinese mobs. The reason for the Chinese attacks against Korean residents in Manchuria was believed to be the perceived Korean collaboration with Japanese colonial rule.

Armed Chinese groups swept through villages, looting food, money, and clothing while indiscriminately beating or killing those who resisted. They also raped women. Korean women tried to avoid rape by smearing their faces with soot or spending nights hiding in fields with their entire families, enduring mosquito bites.

Han Chinese later brutally massacred Yanbian Koreans from 1967-1970 during the Cultural revolution, accusing them of being collaborator remnants of Gando Special Force. During the Cultural Revolution, ethnic Koreans were killed and persecuted in Yanbian. Many non-Han Chinese residents of Yanbian were suspected to be disloyal to the Chinese state, and subsequently beaten, killed, publicly humiliated, fired, exiled or imprisoned. One Yanbian Korean professor who was attacked was accused of being a spy for Japan and a collaborator remnant. During the Cultural Revolution, many Korean cadres including Zhu Dehai were prosecuted as capitalist roaders, local nationalists or counterrevolutionists. Many faculty members of Yanbian University were also prosecuted. The number of Yanbian University's faculty and staff decreased to 23.7% of that in 1966. The Korean language was labeled as part of the Four Olds, texts in Korean were burned. According to Julia Lovell, "[e]vents took a horrific turn in the frontier town of Yanbian, where freight trains trundled from China into the DPRK, draped with the corpses of Koreans killed in the pitched battles of the Cultural Revolution, and daubed with threatening graffiti: 'This will be your fate also, you tiny revisionists!'"
