= Choe Goun jeon =

Korean work of fiction

Choe Goun jeon (崔孤雲傳 The Tale of Ch'oe Ch'i-wŏn) is a classical Korean work of fiction. It is a compilation of fables involving Ch'oe Ch'i-wŏn (857-?), also known as Go Un (孤雲 Lonely Cloud), a noted writer and Confucian official in the late Unified Silla period. The story recounts the life of Ch'oe Ch'i-wŏn, whose father suspected him of being the child of a golden pig when he was born, and thus abandoned him. However, he later become the envoy of the Unified Silla empire and was dispatched to China where he was active for a period of time. According to the story, when he finally returned to the Silla empire, he went to Gayasan Mountain and disappeared without a trace. Choe Goun jeon is also referred to as Choe Chung jeon, Choe Munheon jeon, Choe Munchang jeon, and Ch'oe Ch'i-wŏn jeon. “Ch'oe Ch'ung” is the name of Choe Chawan's father in these works, while “Munchang” is one of Ch'oe Ch'i-wŏn's pen names. “Munheon” is a name bestowed upon him in order to extol his scholarly contributions and good deeds.

== Authorship ==
The author of the Choe Goun jeon is unknown. The date of creation is estimated to be sometime before the mid-sixteenth century. This is because in Go Sangan (高尙顔, 1553–1623)’s Hyobin japgi (效顰雜記 Literary Miscellany by Hyobin), there is a record of a person having read Choe Munchang jeon (崔文昌傳 The Tale of Ch'oe Ch'i-wŏn). There is also a record that indicates that Go Sangan, then in his mid-twenties, read Ch'oe Ch'i-wŏn's fable of the golden pig as noted in Choe Goun jeon and thought “So such things are possible!”

== Plot ==
When Ch'oe Ch'ung is appointed as a suryeong (head of the provincial office) at Munchang, his wife is kidnapped by a golden pig. The golden pig has a weakness: he can be killed by sticking a deer skin to the back of his head. Ch'oe Ch'ung's wife cunningly discovers the golden pig's weakness and thereby kills him. Choe Chung then rescues his wife and they return to their home. Shortly afterwards, his wife gives birth to a son, but Choe Chung suspects that the child was fathered by the golden pig and throws him away at the seaside. There, the child learns how to read by himself and becomes well-versed in writing.

One night, the Emperor of China hears the sounds of someone reciting a text. Searching for the source of the sound, the Emperor discovers that it is coming from Silla. The Emperor then selects two of the most accomplished scholars in China and sends them to Silla to appraise the people's skill. The scholars take a boat and arrive at the seashore where they meet a child (Ch'oe Ch'i-wŏn). After seeing the child's skill at reading and writing and realizing their own skills do not even measure up to a mere child's, the scholars do not dare to explore the rest of Silla and they return to China.

Discovering that Silla is filled with numerous talented and capable people, the Emperor decides to invade Silla. He then orders an egg to be wrapped in cotton and placed in a chest made out of stone, securely sealing it up. He then sends the chest to Silla along with a letter that states that if they cannot correctly guess what is inside the chest, he will attack Silla. The Silla King gathers all the scholars in the land and agonizes over what to do.

At the time, the Silla Premier, Naeop, had a daughter who was the most beautiful, talented, and virtuous in all the land. Ch'oe Ch'i-wŏn pretends that he is a mirror repairman and goes to the Silla Premier's home. At his home, Ch'oe Ch'i-wŏn purposefully breaks a mirror and says that he will compensate him by becoming his servant. Ch'oe Ch'i-wŏn takes good care of the horses and tends the gardens so excellently that people start regarding him strangely.

Meanwhile, the Silla King gives a strict order to Premier Naeop to solve the secret of the stone chest. While everyone in the household is filled with worry, Ch'oe Ch'i-wŏn tells the premier that if he can marry his daughter, he will reveal the secret of the chest. With no other way, the premier marries his daughter to Ch'oe Ch'i-wŏn. Ch'oe Ch'i-wŏn correctly guesses the object inside the chest, and the Chinese Emperor demands that they send the person that correctly answered to China. Ch'oe Ch'i-wŏn is made into an envoy of Silla and is dispatched to China. On the way, Ch'oe Ch'i-wŏn meets Imok, a monster serpent that is the son of the Dragon King, and receives his help; in Zhejiang, he meets an old woman and receives a cotton cloth soaked in soy sauce; by a riverbank, he receives a magical talisman from a beautiful woman. The Chinese Emperor and his vassals use copious trickery and schemes to try and harm Ch'oe Ch'i-wŏn, but Choe uses the talisman and escapes the dangerous situation through his literary genius and supernatural forces.

A few years later, Hwangso's Rebellion breaks out but Ch'oe Ch'i-wŏn singlehandedly quells the rebellion with a one-page manifesto. The Emperor is extremely happy and bestows Ch'oe Ch'i-wŏn with many honors, but his other vassals become jealous and slander Ch'oe Ch'i-wŏn. As a result, Ch'oe Ch'i-wŏn is banished to an island in the south. There, Ch'oe Ch'i-wŏn sucks on the soy sauce-soaked cloth he previously received and manages to stave off death. Contrary to all expectations, Ch'oe Ch'i-wŏn does not die and the Emperor summons Ch'oe Ch'i-wŏn and rebukes him. However, Ch'oe Ch'i-wŏn invokes the Taoist magic imbued in a work of his writing and finally, the Chinese Emperor bows his head and apologizes. Ch'oe Ch'i-wŏn then returns to Silla. Afterwards, Ch'oe Ch'i-wŏn is banished under the pretext that he made a mistake during the Silla King's honored visit. Finally, Ch'oe Ch'i-wŏn takes his family to Gayasan Mountain and isolates himself from the rest of the world, never to be heard from again.

== Features and significance ==
Choe Goun jeon consists of numerous fables involving Ch'oe Ch'i-wŏn and thus, the interpretation of the work is quite particular. Research on Choe Goun jeon can largely be classified into the following three categories: first, research that interprets Choe Goun jeon as expressing growing anti-China sentiment among Koreans and containing a nationalist consciousness; second, as a work that demonstrates a society that reveres talent and merit; third, that Choe Goun jeon demonstrates a critical consciousness towards anti-China sentiment founded upon the Joseon ideology of haedong doga and Joseon's ruling power.

In the Gubi munhak daegye (구비문학대계 Complete Works of Korean Oral Literature), after surveying all the fables that refer to Ch'oe Ch'i-wŏn that have been transmitted to this day, the majority of them refer to Ch'oe Ch'i-wŏn as the son of a “golden pig.” In the last part of Choe Goun jeon, Ch'oe Ch'i-wŏn throws a talisman marked with the Chinese character for “pig” (猪) and returns to Silla. (In some versions of the text, he rides a blue lion and returns home). Although some versions of the story include an episode where Ch'oe Ch'i-wŏn himself declares that he is not the son of a golden pig, there is a possibility that this was a later modification in the novel in consideration of maintaining the story's rationality. Moreover, the scenes where China sets up tests for Joseon can be interpreted as scenes that demonstrate China's sense of competitiveness with regard to Joseon. Similar stories to Choe Goun jeon include “The Child That Defeated the Chinese Emperor” and “The Old Man That Astonished Li Rusong.”

== Archival materials ==
There are a total of 31 extant copies of Choe Goun jeon kept in various universities and research centers. There are 15 handwritten copies in classical Chinese, 8 handwritten copies in Korean, and 8 printed copies in Korean.
