= Korean invasion of Manchuria =

1901–1904 Korean Empire–Qing dynasty conflict

Korean Empire invasion of Manchuria
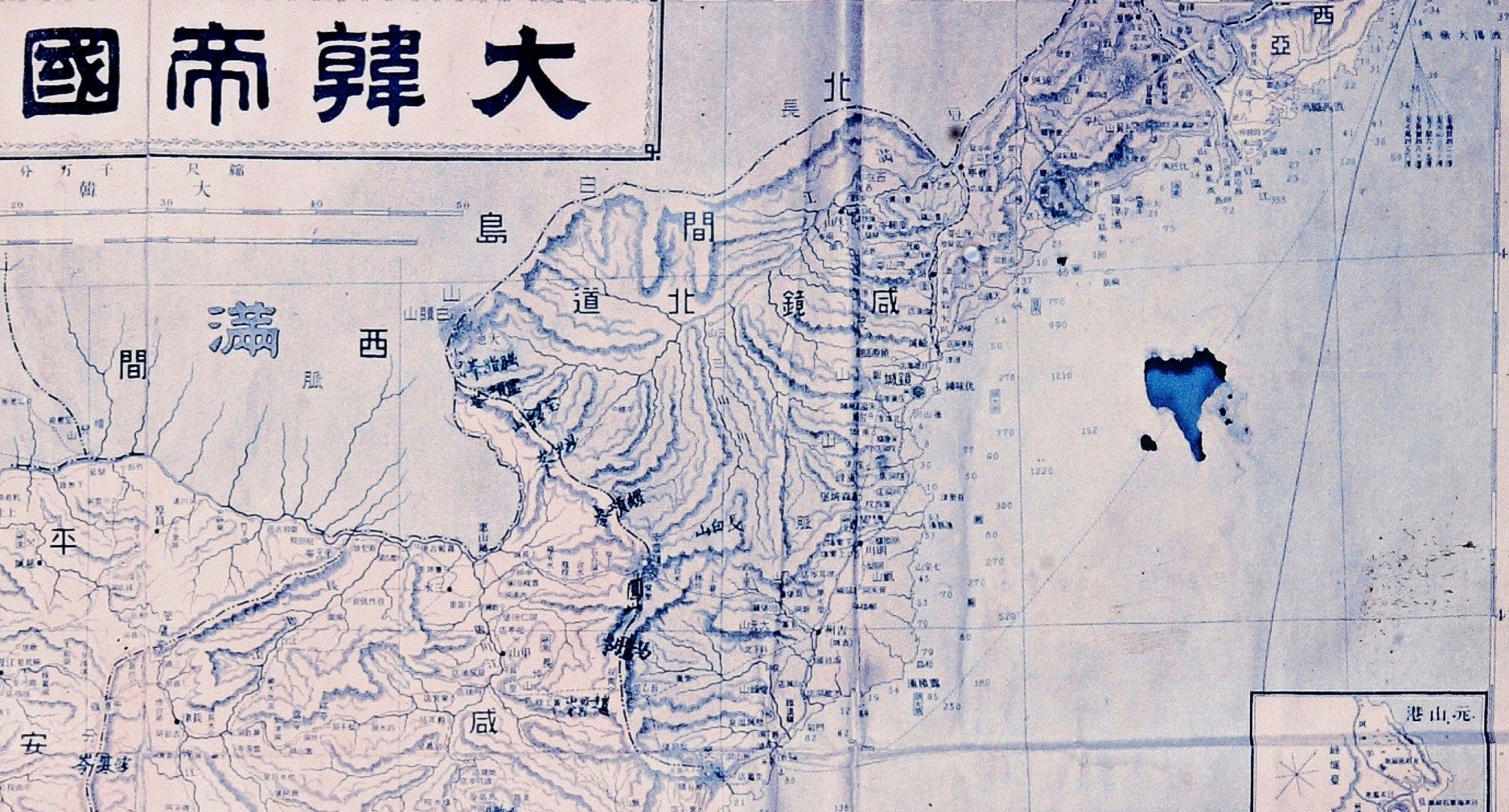
- Map of Jiandao (19th century)
Date	March 1901 – 20 December 1904 (3 years, 9 months, 1 week and 3 days)
Location	Jiandao, Manchuria, China
Result	Korean victory
Territorial changes	Korean temporary control of Jiandao

Belligerents
Korea	China

Commanders and leaders
Yi Bum-yun	

The Korean Empire invasion of Manchuria was an invasion of Manchuria (Northeast China, then ruled by the Qing dynasty) by the Korean Empire. The attack began on 11 August 1902, when Gojong of Korea sent Yi Bum-yun to Jiandao (also called "Gando" in Korea) as an observer. The attack ended in victory for Korea, which gained some control over Jiandao until the Gando Convention of 1909.

== Background ==
From the 1860s, Koreans from Hamgyong Province moved to Jiandao ("Gando") to escape famine. In 1885 and 1887, the Qing dynasty and Joseon held conferences on their borders. The Qing dynasty of China wanted to expel the Koreans living in Jiandao. However, these conferences between the two governments failed to resolve the issue of Jiandao.

The struggle over Jiandao intensified after the Korean Empire proclamation. Some newspapers, such as Jeguk Sinmun and Tongnip Sinmun, returned to the issue of people and territory. Cho Chon-woo, an observer in North Hamgyung Province, reported that since the Tomun River flowed past Jeung Mountain and into the Songhua River, the area east of the Tomun River and south of Jeung Mountain belonged to Korea.

== Invasion ==
When Russian troops captured Manchuria during the Boxer Rebellion, Korea saw this as an opportunity to settle its border disputes with Qing China. From 1901, The Korean Empire prepared to take control of Jiandao. In 1901, Korean General Yi Hak-gyun, Diplomat Sands in Korea, and captain Payeur were sent to observe Jiandao. The French envoy, Victor Collin de Plancy, reported that Korean government would benefit by taxing Jiandao's inhabitants, and would increase jobs and influence by sending officials there. He also reported that the Russian legation opposed an invasion because this might cause the loss of Russian territory.

The police station was established in March 1901, which existed in Jiandao until 1906. Two hundred policemen were stationed in Jiandao. The police station divided Jiandao into five subdivisions: North Jiandao, Jongseong Jiandao, Hoeryong Jiandao, Musan Jiandao, and Gyeongwon Jiandao. In 1902, Imperial Korea sent Yi Bum-yun to Jiandao as an observer to strengthen its control over the area. The Korean Government sent Yi Beom-yun, who was not part of the Imperial Korean Army, as a Jiandao observer to invade Jiandao in 1903. South of the Tumen River, Korea established Jinwidae. A police force. Korea sent a battalion of 150 soldiers to Jongseung, 200 to Musan County, 200 to Hoeryong, 100 more to Jongseung, 100 to Onsong County and 50 to Kyongwon County. Jinwidae's border defenses were so tight that the Qing officials could not control the Koreans. When police forces were stationed in Jiandao, the purpose of Jinwidae was changed to border protection.

Realizing it was impossible to protect the Koreans without force, Yi established the Sapodae, which was a militia consisting of both the righteous army, and Imperial Korean Army. In 1904, the Japanese embassy in Korea reported the Korean government as claiming that there was no document that explicitly recorded Jiandao as part of the Qing territory. From September 1903, Yi began to build up an armed force, digging extensive trenches between Bongcheon (now Shenyang), Manchuria, Jilin, and Jiandao. He employed Russian instructors to train the army and bought 500 rifles from Seoul. The Korean government supported the Sa-po dae because of Gojong's desire to control Jiandao and Yi Yong-ik's support. According to a Qing official, the violence of the Korean army was as follows. On 4 September 1903, 1,000 Korean soldiers crossed the Yalu River. These Korean soldiers burned and looted Chinese territory across the Yalu River. On 2 October 1903, 700-800 Korean soldiers broke into a county office in Linjiang. To avoid further conflict with China, the Korean government summoned Yi in 1904. Yi refused to obey the Korean government's order and instead led his troops to Primorsky Krai, where he joined many Korean independence activists such as Choe Jae-hyeong and An Jung-geun.

== Aftermath ==
After the invasion, the Koreans began to regard Jiandao as Korean territory. For instance, the 1907 map of Korea included Jiandao as Korean territory. However, as the Japanese started to gradually colonize Korea, and the Japan–Korea Treaty of 1905 deprived Korea of its diplomatic sovereignty and gave full authority over all aspects of Korea's foreign relations to the Japanese Foreign Office, Koreans started to remove Jiandao from the territory of Korea. Professor Yi Tae-jin of Seoul University claimed that the Koreans regarded the Japanese interference as an invasion because the Japanese and Russians were fighting in the Russo-Japanese War and the Sapodae fought alongside the Russians to defend Jiandao. When Japan began interfering in the Manchuria border, the Korean Daily News which once referred to Jiandao as Korean territory changed its position. The dispute ended with the Gando Convention (signed by China and Japan in 1909), which recognized the Chinese claim to Jiandao (Gando). Korea was annexed by Japan in the following year with the Japan–Korea Treaty of 1910.

== See also ==
- Boxer Rebellion
- Military of the Korean Empire
  - Jinwidae
- Gando
