= Continental Policy (Japan) =

Lands ruled under the Empire of Japan

Japan's Continental Policy was a Pan-Asian strategy pursued by Japan, especially the Imperial Japanese Army, between the Meiji Restoration and Japan's expansion during World War II. The policy's major aim was to conquer Japan's neighboring countries such as Korea and China to dominate East Asia.

== Continental Policy before the Meiji Restoration ==
Before the Meiji Restoration, the idea of expanding the lands ruled by Japan had already been expressed in the country. The legendary Emperor Jimmu, the first Emperor of Japan in mythology, had imagined ruling the world. Also, Empress Jingū mentioned conquering Samhan.

In the late 16th century, Toyotomi Hideyoshi completed the unification of Japan and twice invaded Korea. The aim of the invasions was to prepare for a future conquest of China. Although he failed to achieve this, his actions symbolized the start of Japan's expansionist era.

In the late Tokugawa shogunate, many advisers proposed the conquest of various lands and the setting up of colonies. Honda Toshiaki wrote that Japan should begin to conquer the world with the ultimate aim of becoming the world's strongest nation. To achieve this, he suggested that Japan should occupy Manchuria, Sakhalin, and Kamchatka Peninsula first, and follow the lead of European nations in setting up overseas colonies. Nobuhiro Sato suggested that the procedure for ruling Asia should be to capture Manchuria first, then East Asia, and finally South Asia. This became the strategy used by Japan in World War II.

== Continental Policy after the Meiji Restoration ==
In the mid-19th century, Japan had been strengthened by the Meiji Restoration and had built a modernized and centralized Japanese government. The Meiji Government greatly encouraged the modernization of Japan, setting up industrial enterprises and starting the Japanese Industrial Revolution in mid-1880s. Due to many factors affecting Japan, Japan decided to be a military-based country, creating the Continental Policy.

== Japan's plan and actions ==
=== Plan ===
Tanaka Giichi has been accused of writing the Tanaka Memorial, a plan outlining the procedures of the Continental Policy in 1927. According to the text, "If we want to conquer the World, we need to conquer China first. If we want to conquer China, we need to conquer Mongolia and Manchuria first. If we want to conquer Mongolia and Manchuria, we need to conquer Korea and Taiwan first." However, in the wake of the countless war crime accusations by the victorious Allies after World War II, intensive searches for a Japanese language original proved unsuccessful, and the original document, if it existed at all, has never been found. Furthermore, in 1995, a former NKVD official stated that the document was a forgery created in 1931 by the Soviet Union to sow anti-Japanese sentiment abroad, especially in the United States.

While the Tanaka Memorial has been mentioned in newspapers and school textbooks in China, most Japanese historians contend that the document is a forgery.

=== Actions ===
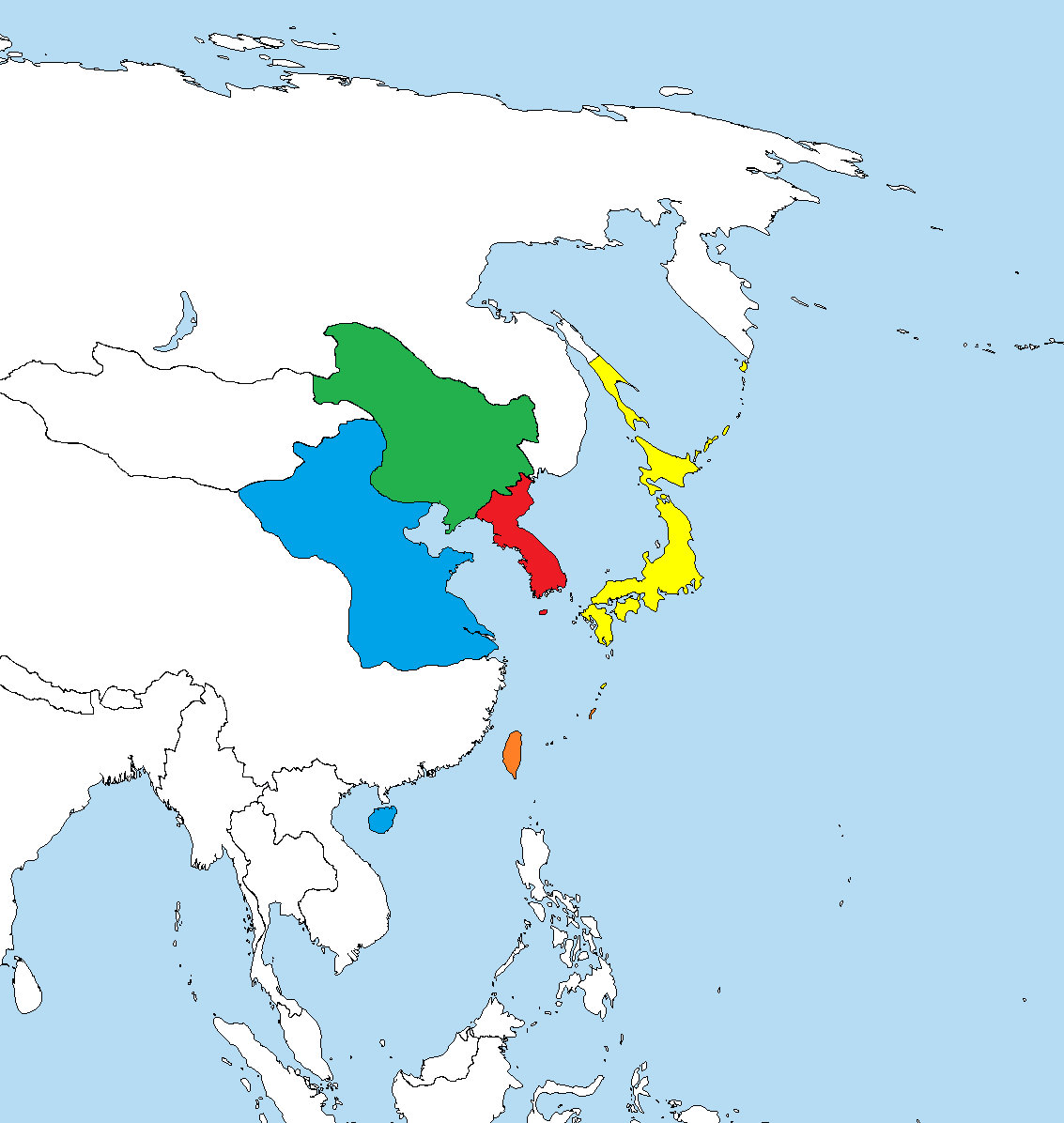
Japan First stage, occupy Taiwan (Formosa) Second stage, occupy Korea Third stage, occupy Manchuria Last stage, occupy China (failed)

Japan's first modern foreign action was the conquering of Ryukyu by the Satsuma Domain in 1879. However, this was not part of a wider plan, and was organised by the Satsuma Domain. Then, Japan won the First Sino-Japanese War and annexed Taiwan and Penghu in 1895. Following that, Japan created a puppet state in Korea with the excuse of suppressing the Donghak Peasant Revolution. Japan finally occupied Korea in 1910.

In 1932, Japan captured Manchuria and built the puppet state of Manchukuo. Japan attacked China in 1937 and attempted to complete the Continental Policy. Japan's failure to conquer China and its defeat in World War II cost it the entirety of its overseas territory. It also symbolized the end of Japan's expansion and the failure of the Continental Policy.

== See also ==
- Hokushin-ron – a political doctrine promoting the Japanese conquest of Manchuria and Siberia
- Nanshin-ron – a political doctrine promoting the Japanese conquest of Southeast Asia and the Pacific Islands
