= Anti-Chinese sentiment in Korea =

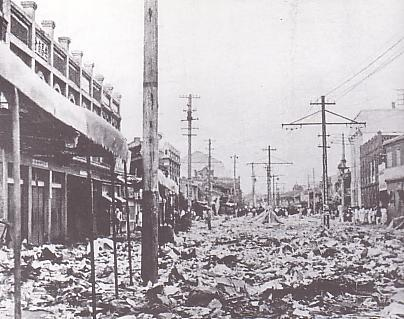
Anti-Chinese riots in Pyongyang, Korea in the aftermath of the Wanpaoshan Incident (1931)

Korea has had a long history of both resistance against and subordination to Imperial China. Until the onset of Western imperialism in the 19th century, Korea had been part of the sinocentric East Asian regional order. According to public opinion polls, South Koreans have overwhelmingly negative opinions of China and Chinese people.

== History ==
In 1931, while Korea was dominated by Imperial Japan, there was a dispute between Chinese and Korean farmers in Wanpaoshan, Manchuria. It was highly sensationalized in the Japanese and Korean press, and used as propaganda to increase anti-Chinese sentiment. It caused a series of anti-Chinese riots throughout Korea, starting in Incheon on July 3 and spreading rapidly to other cities. Chinese sources estimate that 146 people were killed, 546 wounded, and a considerable number of properties were destroyed. The worst riot occurred in Pyongyang on July 5. It has been argued, therefore, that the Japanese had a considerable influence on sinophobia in Korea.

Starting in October 1950, the People's Volunteer Army (PVA) of the People's Republic of China (PRC) fought in the Korean War (1950–1953) on the side of North Korea against South Korean and United Nations troops. Throughout the Cold War, South Korea remained an ally of the Republic of China. There were no official relations between South Korea and the PRC until August 24, 1992, when formal diplomatic relations were established between Seoul and Beijing.

In the 1960s, South Korean laws directed against foreign property ownership, at a time when most foreign ownership was by ethnic Chinese, led to many Chinese emigrating from South Korea to Taiwan.

=== Recent history ===
In the early 2000s, a dispute over the history of Goguryeo, which both Koreas and China claim as their own, caused tension between the two countries.

Anti-PRC sentiment in South Korea has been on a steady rise since 2002. According to the Pew Global Attitude Project, favorable view of China steadily declined from 66% in 2002 to 48% in 2008, while unfavorable view of China rose from 31% in 2002 to 49% in 2008. According to polls by the East Asia Institute, positive view of China's influence declined from 48.6% in 2005 to 38% in 2009, while negative view of Chinese influence rose from 46.7% in 2005 to 50% in 2008.

During the Seoul leg of the 2008 Olympic torch relay, over 6,000 Chinese students clashed with protesters. Chinese demonstrators clashed with local activists who rallied to protest the torch relay, citing Beijing's discouraging treatment of North Korea defectors and the regime's crackdown on Tibetans' rioting for independence. With the result of these violent clashes in central Seoul, anti-Chinese sentiments in Korea aroused great indignation toward the Chinese people. The Ministry of Justice of South Korea indicated that it would punish all such demonstrators, regardless of nationality. The Government of South Korea is toughening visa regulations for Chinese students.

In 2017, relations further strained with the deployment of the THAAD missile defense system in South Korea, causing China to start its boycott against Korea. Koreans, in turn, developed anti-Chinese views over reports of economic retaliation by Beijing.

A study in 2018 by the Chinese Academy of Sciences showed anti-Chinese sentiments in South Korea, with the majority of South Koreans expressing positive sentiments towards the United States and negative sentiments towards China. This contradicts a previous study by the same institute in 2017 that stated that South Korea, in the long term, would not be able to maintain an anti-US stance against Chinese and Russian retaliation. According to the study, since 2013, it has become a trans-generational and trans-political trend in South Korea where the younger generation in their 20s have higher perceptions of China as a threat than the older generation in their 60s. The study deduced three factors behind anti-Chinese sentiments in South Korea, which are cold war ideology, nationalism and China threat theory. According to its analysis, anti-Chinese sentiments first began to rise with the Northeast Project in 2004, and took a decisive turn for the worse in the THAAD conflict in 2017.

According to a poll released by the Institute for Peace and Unification Studies at Seoul National University in 2018, 46 percent of South Koreans find China as the most threatening country to inter-Korean peace (compared to 33 percent for North Korea), marking the first time China was seen as a bigger threat than North Korea since the survey began in 2007. According to a Central European Institute of Asian Studies poll in 2022, 81% of South Koreans have negative views of China, while 77% had negative views of Chinese people.

Political "anti-China sentiment" (Chinese: 反中, Korean: 반중) caused by South Korea's THAAD deployment and China's economic retaliation in 2015 led to an increase in "anti-Chinese racism" (Chinese: 反華, Korean: 혐중) in South Korea over time: according to a Hong Kong traveler who told Deutsche Welle (DW) in 2025, she was treated with inappropriate remarks such as "Chinese should leave immediately!" when using Cantonese on the streets of Seoul; additionally, a Taiwanese media journalist told DW that during dining at a restaurant in Myeongdong, Seoul, where he spoke Taiwanese Mandarin, he felt the "extremely hostile gaze" directed at him from South Koreans around him. Anti-Chinese racism has significantly increased since the 2020s, linked to right-wing populism and promoted by Yoon Suk Yeol supporters and South Korean conservatives.

In 2025, South Korea saw anti-Chinese demonstrations by far-right groups in reaction to introduction of visa free entry for Chinese tourist groups, with slogans including "Korea for Koreans", "Stop the Chinese Boats" and racial slurs. The protesters also supported the restoration of impeached President Yoon Suk Yeol and commemorated the assassination of American right-wing activist Charlie Kirk. President Lee Jae Myung called for a crackdown on such protests, calling them "self-destructive conduct that damages the national interest and image". In January 2026, during a visit to China, Lee criticized anti-Chinese sentiment in South Korea and those who spread conspiracy theories regarding China's involvement in election fraud in South Korea, which he said "angered Chinese people and drove them to turn their backs on Korea". He said that anti-Chinese sentiment harmed the country as it contributed to anti-Korean sentiment in China, leading to consumer boycotts of Korean goods and products.

== Cultural hostility ==
On 13 October 2020, RM, a member of the boy band BTS, made a speech about the Korean War, where he said that South Korea shared a history of pain with the United States. Chinese-run media rallied to lash out against BTS for what they perceived as bias and denial of China's contribution, and Chinese netizens called to boycott anything from Korea and Koreans, despite the fact that China fought against South Korea at the time. After this, hostility against China rose in South Korea, as Koreans accused China of exaggerating the situation.

== See also ==
- Anti-Japanese sentiment in Korea
- Anti-Korean sentiment in China
- Anti-Chinese sentiment in Japan
- Anti-Chinese sentiment in the United States
- Racism in North Korea
- Racism in South Korea
