= Jiandao =

Historical region of Jilin, China

Chinese name
- Traditional Chinese: 間島
- Simplified Chinese: 间岛
Transcriptions
Standard Mandarin
- Hanyu Pinyin: Jiāndǎo
- Wade–Giles: Chien-tao

Korean name
- Hangul: 간도
- Hanja: 間島
Transcriptions
- Revised Romanization: Gando
- McCune–Reischauer: Kando

Jiandao in light green Korea in dark green

Jiandao or Chientao, known in Korean as Gando or Kando, is a historical border region along the north bank of the Tumen River in Jilin Province, Northeast China, that has a high population of ethnic Koreans. The word "Jiandao", literally "Middle Island", originally referred to a shoal in Tumen River between today's Chuankou Village, Kaishantun in Longjing, Jilin, China, and Chongsŏng, Onsong County, in North Korea. The island was an important landmark for immigrants from the Korean Peninsula looking to settle across the river. As the number of immigrants increased, the area covered by the name "Jiandao" gradually changed to reflect the areas of Korean settlement.

In the early 20th century, an expanding Japanese Empire argued that ethnic Koreans living in this area should be placed under its jurisdiction. As one of its first set of attempts to annex northeast China and conquer other parts of mainland China, Imperial Japanese forces in Korea invaded Jiandao in 1907, but Japan withdrew its forces to Korea in 1909 and, under diplomatic pressure from China, recognized the border along Tumen River that had existed before the invasion.

In China, Yanbian is the name used, and Jiandao is not used, due to the latter's association with Japanese colonial occupation. Both North Korea and South Korea recognize the region as a part of the People's Republic of China, but there are some liberal and left-wing nationalist elements in South Korea that endorse the idea that the region should be a part of modern-day Korea. These groups claim what happened in Jiandao between 1907 and 1909 (Japan's invasion and subsequent withdrawal) was an illegal transfer of Korean territory between Japan and China. (Note: Conservatives in South Korea are less interested in Jiandao than liberals and leftists, which has something to do with anti-North sentiment (반북). This is because if the area is attributed to Korea, it is likely to be attributed to North Korea, not South Korea.)

== History ==
Many different states and tribes succeeded each other in ruling the area during ancient times. These included Buyeo, Goguryeo, and Goguryeo's successor state Balhae. Goguryeo, one of the Three Kingdoms of Korea, controlled northern Korea and southern Manchuria, including the territory known as Gando/Jiandao. Balhae was a state that existed in the area during the Tang dynasty in China and the Unified Silla period in Korea. China emphasizes Balhae's temporary tributary relationship to the Tang, while Korea emphasizes that Balhae was a successor state and a cultural extension of Goguryeo.

Balhae was destroyed by the Khitan Liao dynasty in 926, and was formally annexed in 936. Over the next nine to ten centuries the region was administered by the Liao (Khitans), Jin (Jurchens), Yuan (Mongols), Ming, and then the Qing.

In 1712, the border between Qing and Joseon was formally demarcated. For years, Qing officials did not allow people to move to Northeastern China, as they believed that should a Han majority government rise again in parts of China south of the Great Wall, the Manchus could then retreat to their original homeland. Joseon officials also did not allow its subjects to move to Northeastern China. These governmental regulations, along with the general marshy nature of the area, left these lands north of the Tumen River relatively undeveloped; and the region was sparsely populated by Manchu tribes for a long time. Qing officials regularly inspected this region and occasional Korean intruders were detained and sent back to Korea. However, by the late 19th century, peasants in northern Korea were migrating to northeast China to flee famine and poverty. More arrived as refugees when Japanese forces entered Korea in 1894 during the First Sino-Japanese War.

From 1901, the Korean Empire prepared to take control of Jiandao. In 1901, Korean General Yi Hak-gyun, the American advisor to Emperor Gojong William F. Sands, and Captain G. Payeur were sent to observe Jiandao. The French envoy, Victor Collin de Plancy, reported that the Korean government would benefit by taxing Jiandao's inhabitants, and would increase jobs and influence by sending officials there. He also reported that the Russian legation opposed an invasion because this might lead to the loss of Russian territory. In 1901, Korea deployed police in Jiandao, and this continued until 1906. The Korean Government sent Yi Beom-yun, who was not part of the Imperial Korean Army, to Jiandao as an observer in 1903. In Jiandao, Yi established Sa-po dae, which was a militia consisting of both a righteous army, and Imperial Korean Army. This army fought against Japan during the Russo-Japanese War. In 1904, the Japanese embassy in Korea reported the Korean government as claiming that there was no document that explicitly recorded Jiandao as part of the Qing territory.

After the Russo-Japanese War, Japan began the process that led to the formal annexation of Korea. In 1905, the Korean Empire became a protectorate of the Empire of Japan, effectively losing diplomatic rights, and was annexed to Imperial Japan in 1910. In the early 20th century, Korean immigration to Manchuria steadily increased, either from refugees fleeing Japanese rule, or from encouragement of emigration by the Japanese government of Korea for the purposes of developing that territory. Some local Chinese governments welcomed the Korean immigrants, as they were a source of skilled labor.

In the meantime, Japan began to expand into northeast China. One of the regions the Japanese targeted was Jiandao (known in Korean as Gando). The Japanese claimed that Jiandao included territory of four counties (Yanji, Wangqing, Helong, and Hunchun) of Jilin Province. The Japanese further claimed ethnic Koreans living in this region should be placed under the jurisdiction of Imperial Japan.

The Japanese first infiltrated Jiandao in April 1907 to collect information and data. On August 7, 1907, Japanese troops invaded Jiandao and claimed that the "Jiandao Issue" was "unsettled" (see: Gando Massacre).

In the Gando Convention of 1909, Japan affirmed territorial rights of the Qing over Jiandao after the Chinese foreign ministry issued a thirteen-point refutation asserting its rightful ownership. Japan agreed to withdraw its invading troops back to Korea in two months. The treaty also contained provisions for the protection and rights of ethnic Koreans under Chinese rule. Nevertheless, there were large Korean settlements and the area remained under significant Japanese influence.

Despite the agreement, Koreans in Jiandao continued to be a source of friction between the Chinese and Japanese governments. Japan maintained that all ethnic Koreans were Japanese nationals, subject to Japanese jurisdiction and law, and demanded rights to police the area. The Qing and subsequent local Chinese governments insisted on its territorial sovereignty over the region.

After the Mukden Incident of 1931, the Japanese military (the Kwantung Army) invaded Manchuria. Between 1931 and 1945, Manchuria was under the control of Manchukuo, a Japanese puppet state. From 1934 the area formed a new Jiandao Province of Manchukuo after the old Jilin Province was split into Binjiang, Jiandao, and a rump Jilin. This period saw the initiation of a new wave of Korean immigration, as the Japanese government actively encouraged (or forced) Korean settlement in order to colonize and develop the region. The Japanese also moved to suppress resistance in the region. Within three and half years (from September 1931 to March 1935), Japanese regular forces and police murdered 4,520 people. During and after the 1930s, many ethnic Koreans in the region joined the Chinese Communist Party.

In December 1938, a counterinsurgency unit called the Gando Special Force was organized by the Japanese Kwantung Army to combat communist guerrillas within the region. The commander of this battalion-size force was Japanese. Historian Philip Jowett noted that during the Japanese occupation of Manchuria, the Gando Special Force "earned a reputation for brutality and was reported to have laid waste to large areas which came under its rule."

On 1 October 1943, Jiandao Province was incorporated as a district in the Dongman Consolidated Province. This district was itself abolished on 28 May 1945, and Jiandao was once again a province.

After World War II and the liberation of Korea, many Korean expatriates in the region moved back to Korea, but a significant number remained in Manchuria; descendants of these people form much of the Korean ethnic minority in China today. The area was first nominally part of the Republic of China's new Songjiang Province, but with the communist seizure of power in 1949, Sonjiang's borders were changed and Jiandao became part of Jilin.

The area is now the Yanbian Korean Autonomous Prefecture in Jilin.

== Boundary claims ==
The claims by some of the Korean irredentists over Gando stem from what is perceived as an ambiguity in the original Sino-Korean boundary agreement.

After several attempts by the Kangxi Emperor to negotiate the issue, in 1712 the Joseon of Korea and Qing of China agreed to delineate the boundaries of the two countries at the Yalu and Tumen rivers. The Qing delegation was led by Mukedeng, and the Joseon delegation was led by Pak Kwon. The two held a joint commission to survey and demarcate the boundaries between the two states. Efforts were taken to locate the sources of the Yalu and Tumen rivers on Baekdu Mountain. Owing to Pak's age, they agreed for Mukedeng's team to ascend the summit alone. Mukedeng's team quickly identified the source of the Yalu, but identification for the Tumen proved more complicated. At last a spot was decided, and a stele was erected as a boundary marker. Over the next year, a fence was built to demarcate the areas where the Tumen river ran underground.

Pak Kwon was instructed by the Joseon government to retain all territory south of the Yalu and Tumen rivers, a goal he accomplished. However, some Korean officials lamented the loss of claims on areas north of the river and criticized Pak Kwon for not accompanying Mukedeng to the summit. The territorial claims stem from the territories held by Goguryeo and Balhae. Nonetheless, the border remained uncontentious for the next 150 years. Cross-border movements were forbidden, and was punishable by death after trespassers were detained and repatriated back to their respective countries.

In the 1870s the Qing government reversed its policy of prohibiting entry to Manchuria, and began allowing Han Chinese settlers into the territory in response to growing Russian encroachment. The area around Gando was opened to settlement in 1881, but Chinese settlers quickly discovered some Korean farming communities already settled in the area. It was apparent that despite the decreed punishment, severe droughts in northern Korea had motivated Korean farmers to seek new lands. The Jilin general-governor Ming-An's official response was to lodge a protest with the Joseon government and offer to allow the Korean population to stay if they agreed to become Qing subjects and adopt Qing customs and dress. Joseon's response was to encourage the farmers not to register as Qing subjects but to return to Korea within the year.

The farmers, unwilling to abandon their homes, argued that because of the ambiguity in the naming of the Tumen river, they were actually already in Korean territory. The Yalu River boundary is of little dispute, but the interpretation of the Tumen River boundary 土門 (토문) caused problems. The name of the river itself originates from the Jurchen word tumen, meaning "ten thousand". The official boundary agreement in 1712 identified the Tumen River using the characters 土門 (Tǔmen) for the phonetic transcription. However, the Tumen River is written as 圖們 (Túmen) in modern Chinese and as 豆滿 in both modern Korean (두만 Duman) and Japanese (とまん Toman). Some Koreans hence claim that the "Tumen" referred to in the treaty is actually a tributary of the Songhua River. Under this interpretation, Gando (where the Koreans settled) would be part of Korean territory.

This confusion arises as the two names sound identical, and neither name is of Chinese origin. The two rivers can be seen in the following map from the period. Korean claims are based on maps showing the border river as 土門 and the claim that this is a different river than the one used for the modern border. However, it is uncertain which modern river the Korean claim corresponds to, as there is no modern tributary of the Songhua River with that name:

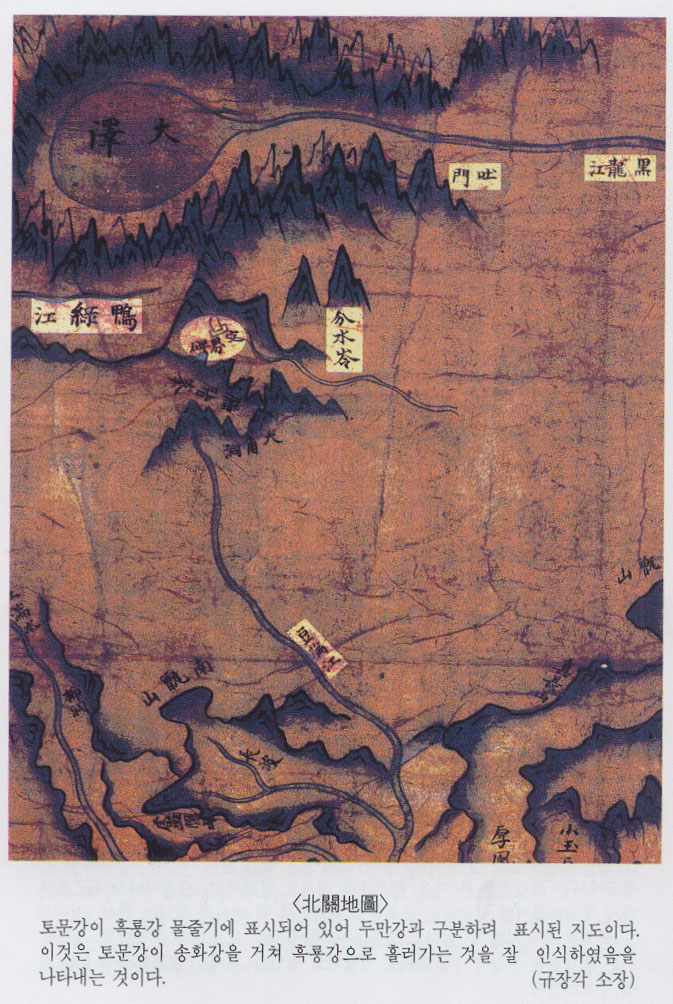

- Satellite view of same location; Baekdu Mountain, Lake Tianchi, and the Tumen River are visible
- Satellite view of the Songhua river and Baekdu Mountain, for comparison purposes

This interpretation of the boundary gradually developed into Joseon official policy. O Yunjung, a Korean official appointed to review the claims made by the farmers and investigate the sources of the river, adopted the latter interpretation and declared that the region did not belong to China. Joseon and Qing officials met in 1885 and 1887 to resolve the dispute, but with little result. Korean officials suggested starting from the stele and tracing the river downwards, while Qing officials proposed starting at the mouth of the Tumen River and moving upstream. From 1905 to 1945, Korea was controlled by Japan and was unable to effectively pursue these claims.

After the liberation of Korea in 1945, some Koreans believed that Jiandao should be given to Korean rule, but the military control by United States of America in the south and Union of Soviet Socialist Republics in the north hindered any unified Korean claim to the territory. The chaos of the Korean War and the geopolitical situation of the Cold War effectively diminished any opportunity for Koreans to highlight the Gando issue. In 1962, North Korea and China signed the Sino–North Korean Border Treaty, which set the Korean border at the Yalu and Tumen rivers, effectively foregoing Korean territorial claims to Gando. South Korea also recognizes this as the boundary between Korea and China.

Today, none of the governments involved (North Korea, South Korea, China, or Japan) make the claim that Gando is Korean territory. In addition, there is little enthusiasm for irredentism among the Korean minority in China. Although there are occasional arguments over historical interpretation, this issue arouses little emotion or official interest on the part of any of the parties, and relations between China and both Koreas remain warm.

In 2004, the South Korean government issued a statement to the effect that it believed that the Gando Convention was null and void. The resultant controversy and strong negative reaction from the PRC led to a retraction of the statement, along with an explanation that its issuance was an "administrative error".

A small number of South Korean activists believe that, under a unified Korea, the treaties signed by North Korea should be deemed null and void, allowing the unified Korea to actively seek regress for Gando. However, the current political situation makes this a faint possibility at best. Also, some scholars claim that China's efforts to incorporate the history of Goguryeo and Balhae into Chinese history is effectively a pre-emptive move to quash any territorial disputes that might arise regarding Gando before a unified Korea can claim such or the Korean ethnic minority in the Manchuria region claim to become part of Korea.

== Images ==
The following maps, of Korea from the 18th century to the 19th century, show Sino-Korean border to be aligned along the Yalu and Tumen rivers, essentially the same as that today between China and North Korea:

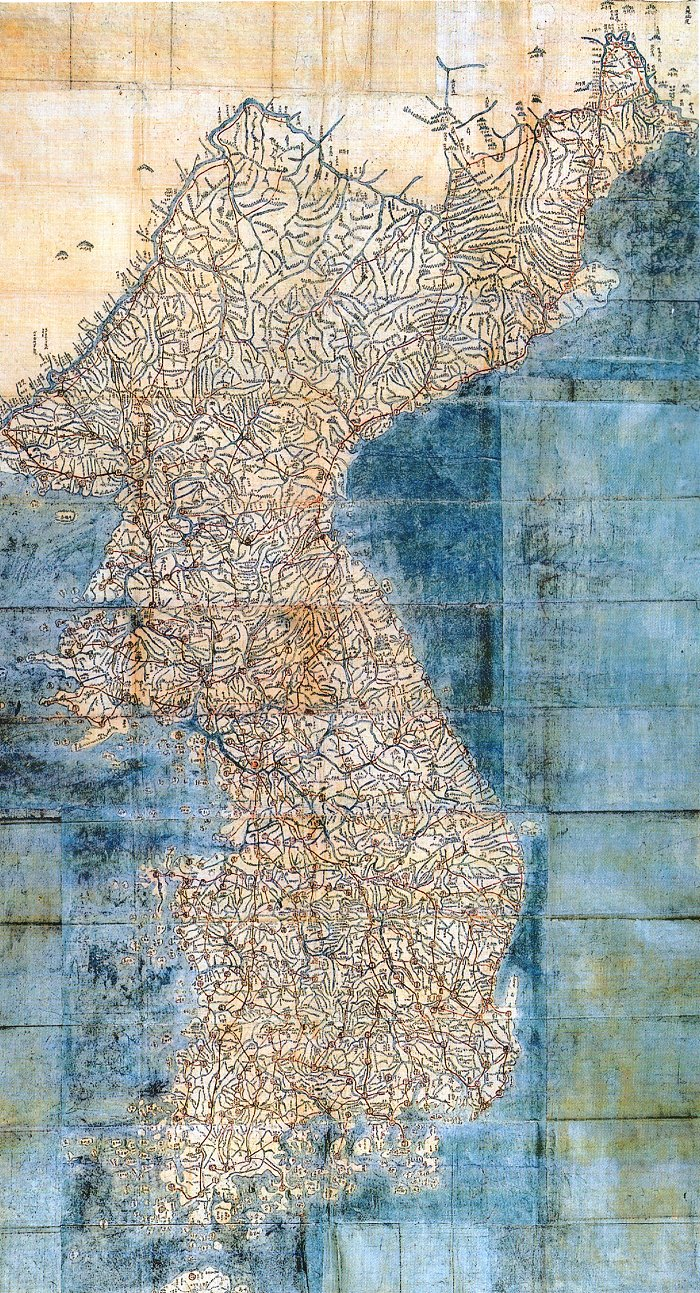

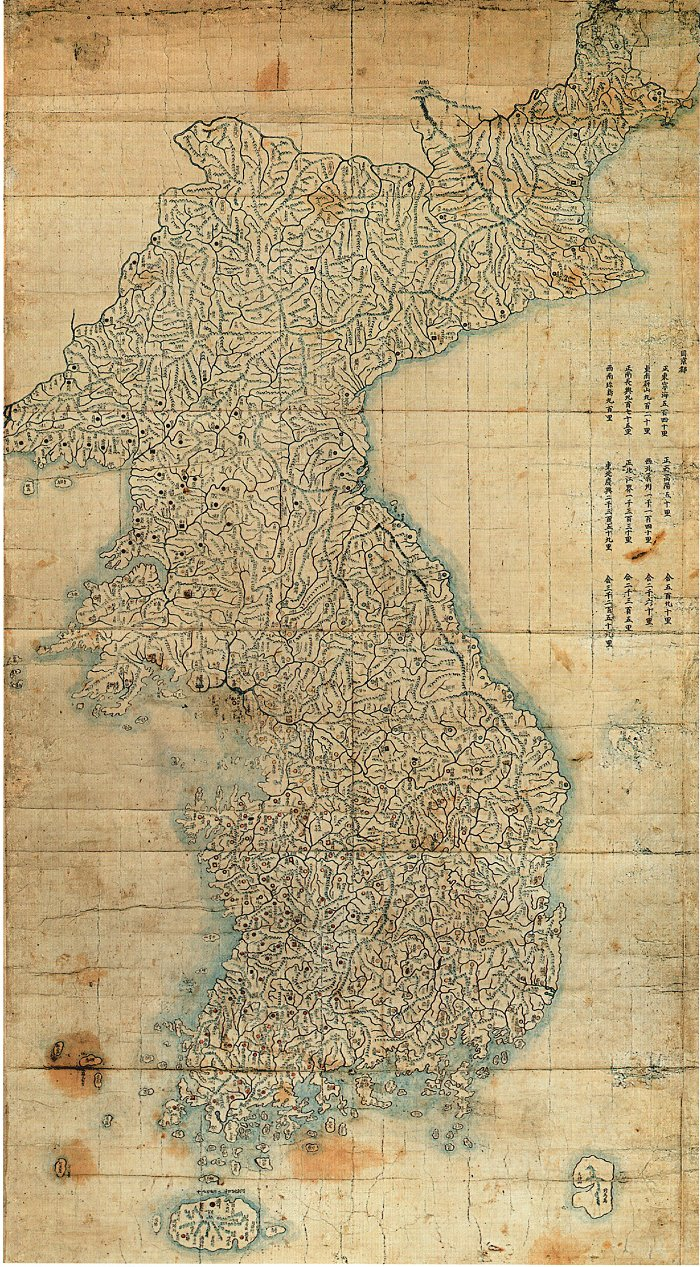

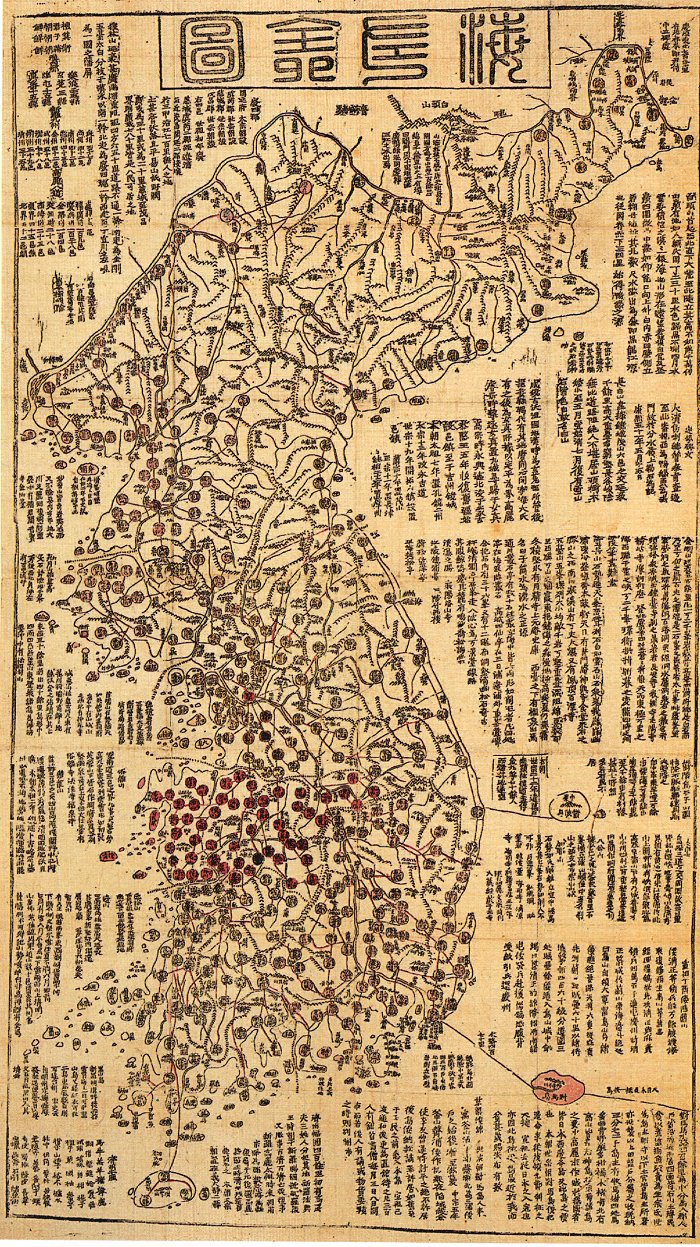

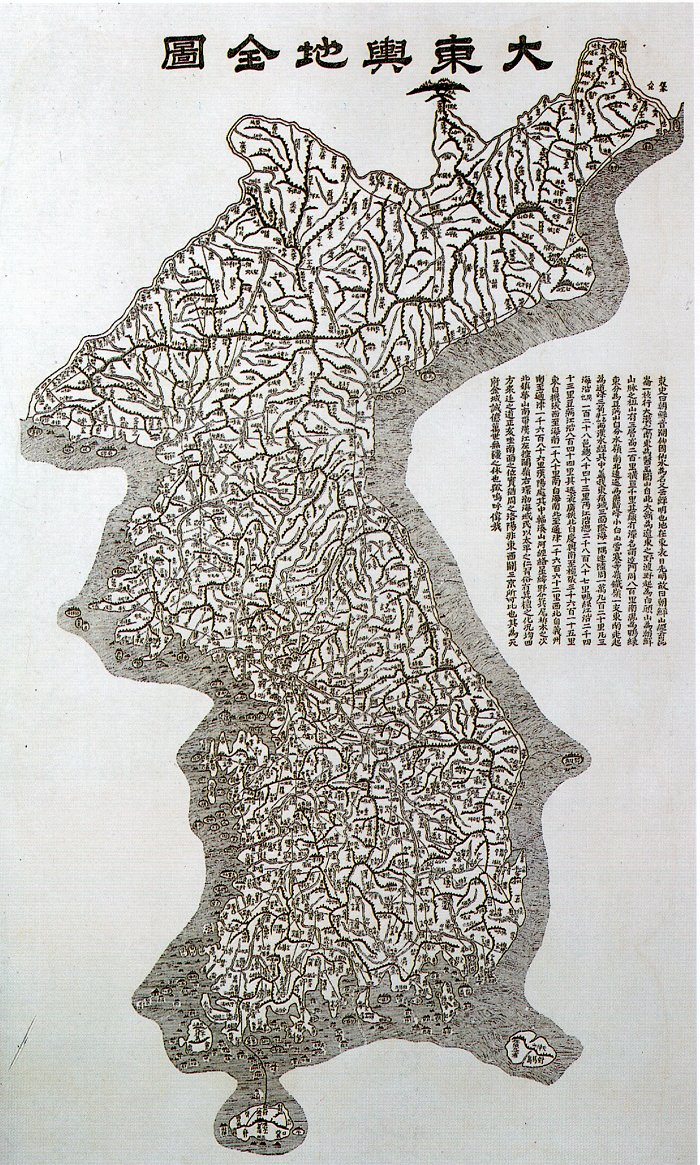

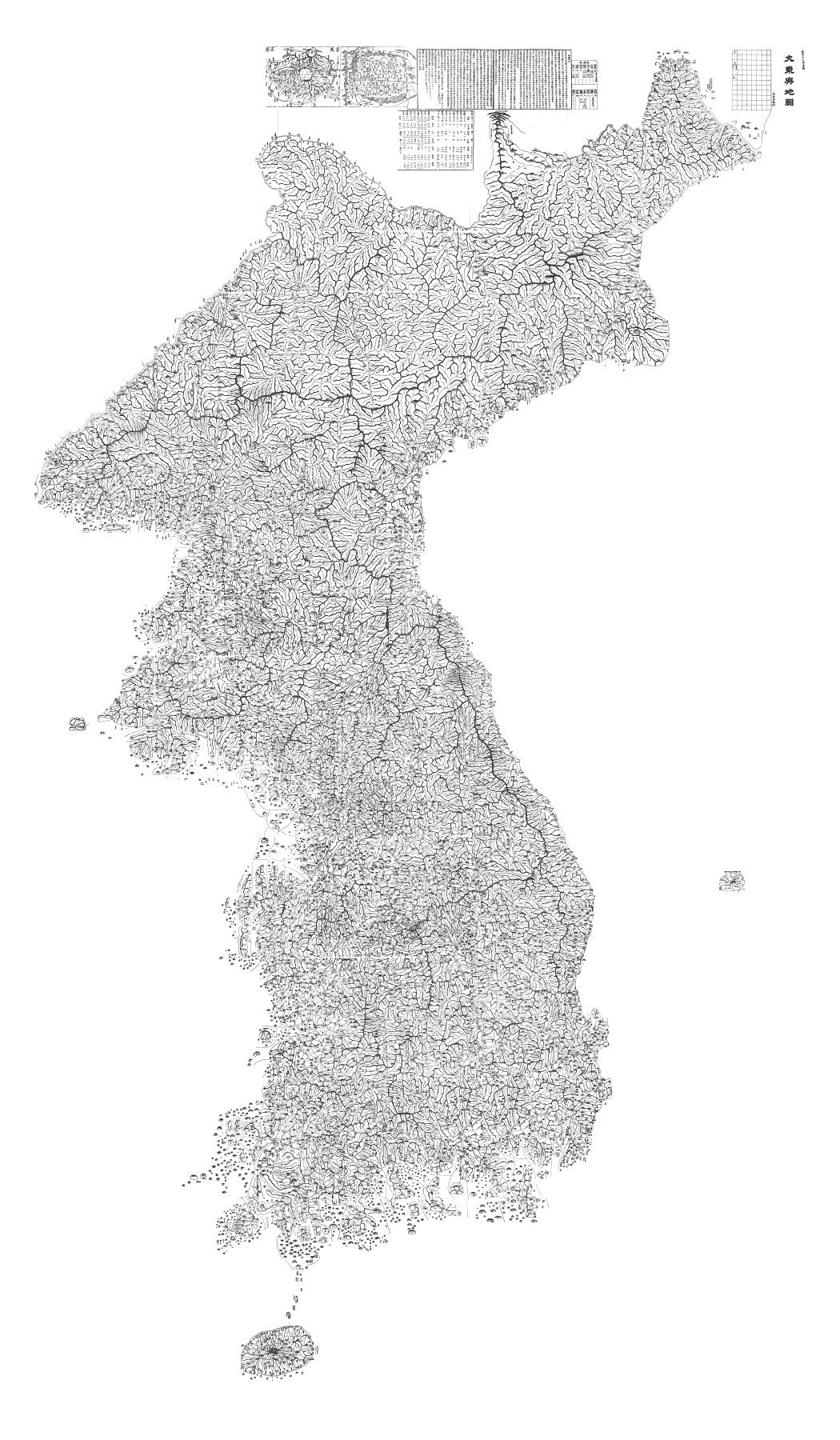

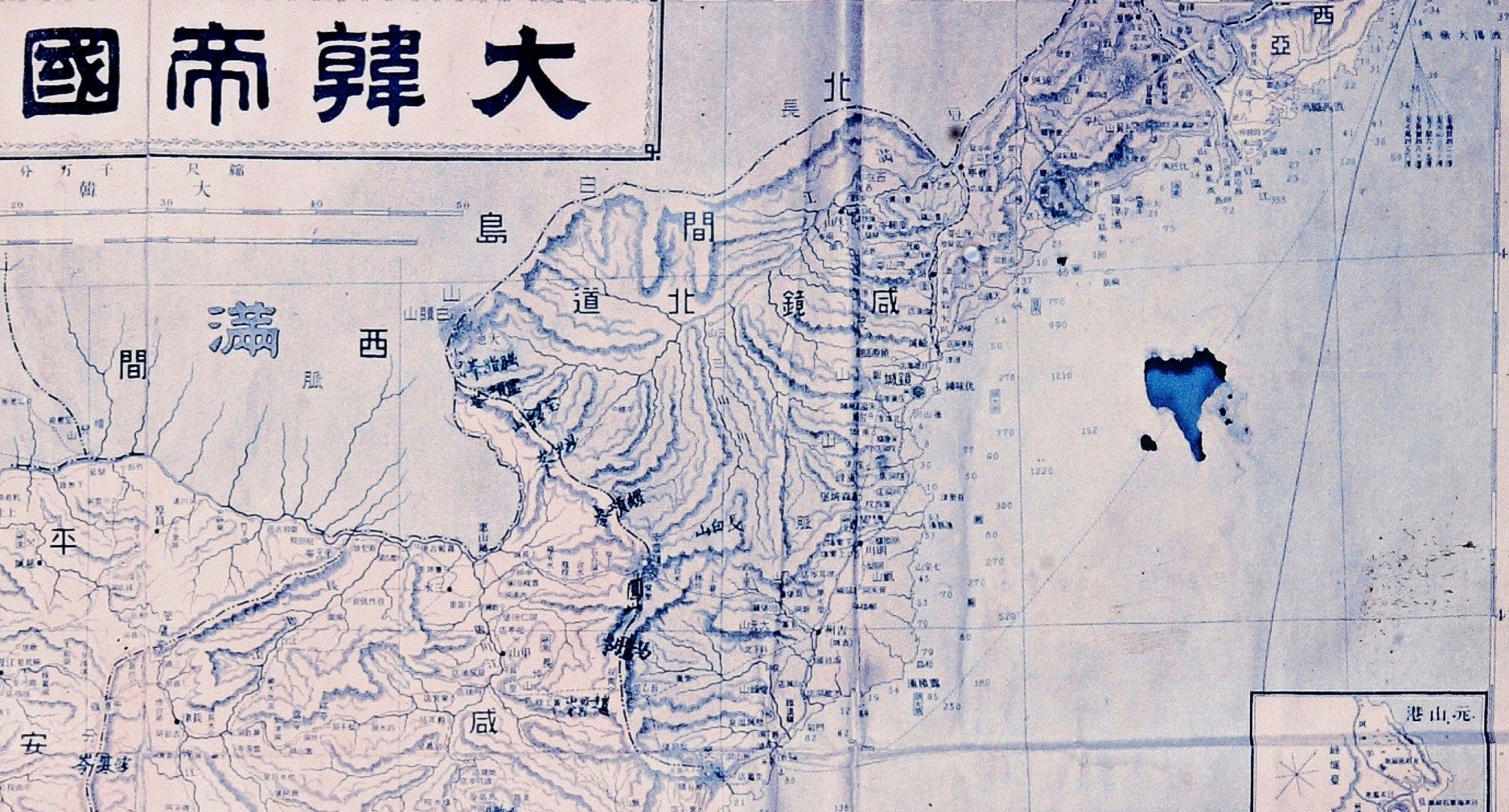

However, there is an exception in the last map, as it shows the border visibly protruding north of the Tumen River.

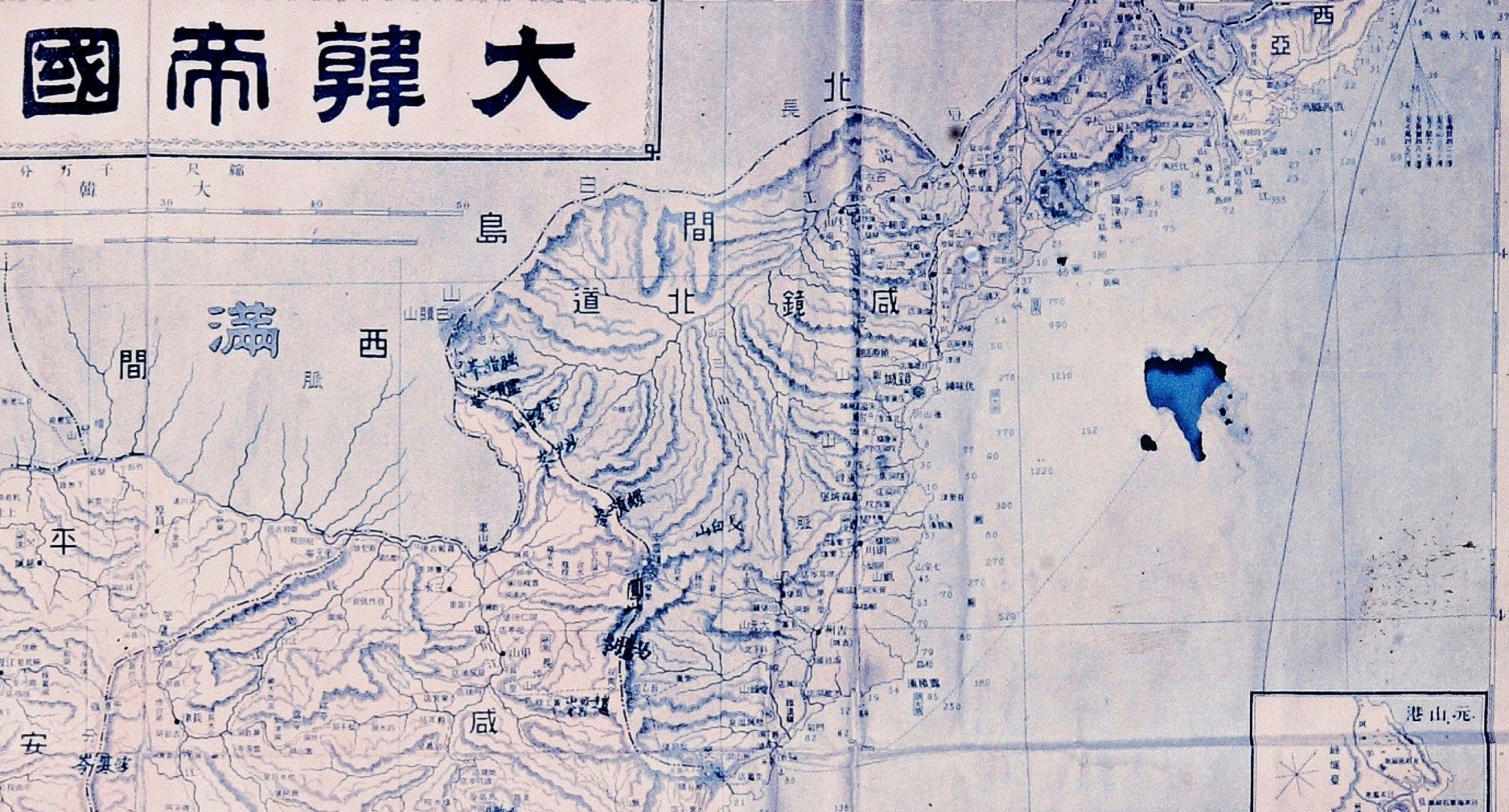

Some Korean claims to Gando are based on other maps. The following were made by western missionaries. However, the first is explicitly stated as being a map of "Quan-Tong Province" (now Liaoning province, China) and Kau-li (Korea), and the second as being a map of the Chinese Tartary (la Tartarie Chinoise). Compared to the Korean-made maps above, the coastlines and rivers are also significantly less accurate, but the Sino-Korean border is not placed at the Yalu (Amnok) River, which is quite clear in the following maps:

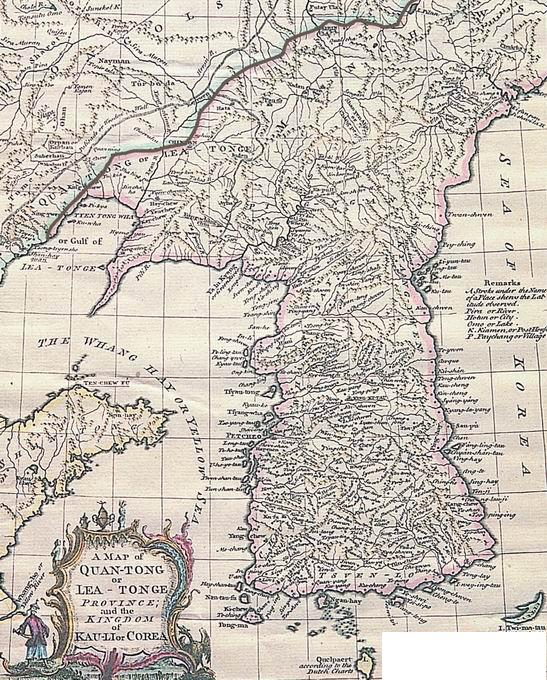

Note that two almost identical versions of a first map exists, showing significant differences in the border. One shows the boundaries similar to modern-day province and country borders, while the other shows the Sino-Korean border significantly further north.

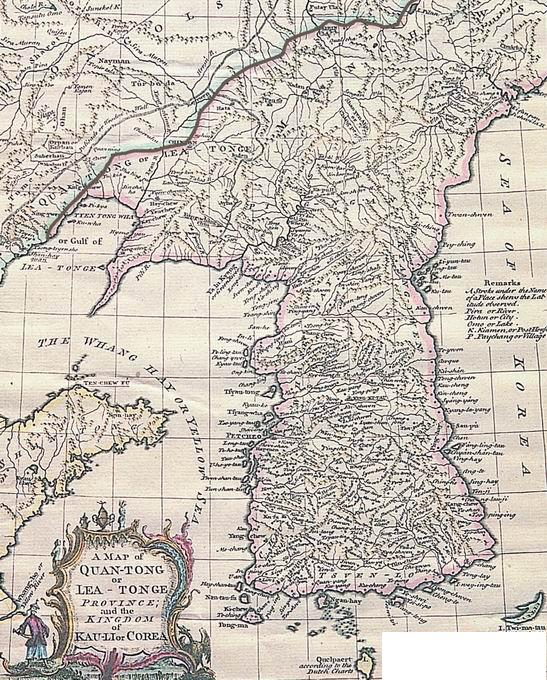

== See also ==
- Gando Convention
- Korean invasion of Manchuria
- Heaven Lake
- Yanbian Korean Autonomous Prefecture
