= Minsaengdan incident =

1933–1936 purges of Koreans in China

The Minsaengdan incident, or Min-Sheng-T'uan Incident, was a series of purges occurring between 1933 and 1936 in which the Chinese Communist Party (CCP) arrested, expelled, and killed Koreans in Manchuria, based on the suspicion that the purged Koreans were supporting the Japanese occupiers as part of the pro-Japanese and anti-communist group, Minsaengdan. The CCP arrested and expelled over 1,000 of its Korean members and killed 500 during the purges. Korean guerilla leader and future founder of North Korea Kim Il Sung was arrested and then exonerated during the purges and his opposition to the purges became an important factor in solidifying his leadership among the guerillas opposing the Japanese occupation.

== Background ==
The Empire of Japan had ruled Korea since the Japan-Korea Treaty of 1905 and formally annexed Korea in 1910. In 1931, Imperial Japan used the false flag Mukden Incident as a pre-text to invade Manchuria. The Japanese incursion led to the creation of competing pro-Japanese and nationalist Korean organizations.

After the Comintern's "one country, one party" directive of December 1928, Korean communist partisans were absorbed into the CCP. Following completion of the merger of Korean communists and the CCP in April 1931, more than 90% of the party members in Manchuria were Korean. When the CCP established a united guerilla army in the 1930s, it viewed the Korean border regions as the most promising areas of anti-Japanese resistance. Before the purges of the Minsaengdan incident, the majority-Korean Chinese border region of Kando (present day Yanbian Korean Autonomous Prefecture) had been the seat of radical experiments in self-rule through the formation of soviets.

== Purges ==
One of the pro-Japanese organizations created following the invasion of Manchuria was Minsaengdan (People's Livelihood Corps), formed in February 1932 by Korean migrants to Manchuria. The group petitioned for Japanese authorities for a measure of self-rule in Kando (under Japanese auspices) and sought protection from both communist and Chinese authorities. Ultimately the group never received the aid it requested from Japan and dissolved in October 1932 following assault from the communists.

Nonetheless, suspicions of Minsaengdan activity persisted. Subsequent Japanese interventions and scores of arrests sparked fears of infiltration by the Minsaengdan. Thus, the CCP in Manchuria had become suspicious that any Korean could secretly be a member of the pro-Japanese and anti-communist group. Japanese authorities had also successfully manipulated class and ethnic antagonisms, further undermining the anti-Japanese coalition of Chinese and Koreans.

A series of purges resulted: over 1,000 Koreans were expelled from the CCP, including Kim Il Sung (who was arrested in late 1933 and exonerated in early 1934), and 500 were killed. In early 1932, the eastern Manchuria branch of the CCP launched an anti-Minsaengdan campaign of mass riots, arsons, and assassinations. To prove their loyalty, Korean communists pursued suspected collaborators with a particular vengeance. But as suspicion grew, any association with someone accused of having Minsaengdan ties came under attack, including Korean communists. By late 1932, the Chinese leaders of the CCP's eastern Manchuria branch began to interrogate, torture, and execute rank-and-file party members with such ties (the majority of whom were Korean). Even advocating for Korean independence could be viewed as siding with reactionary organizations like the Minsaengdan.

Ultimately, the purge devastated the Kando region as a base of operations for opposing the Japanese. The purges killed more Korean revolutionaries and supporters than the extermination campaign waged by Japanese troops against the communists.

During the purges of the Minsaengdan incident, Kim Il Sung sezied and burned the suspect files of the Purge Committee. Kim's memoirs - and those of the guerillas who fought alongside him - cite Kim's seizing and burning the suspect files of the Purge Committee as key to solidifying his leadership. After the destruction of the suspect files and the rehabilitation of suspects, those who had fled the purge rallied around Kim.

== Historical legacy ==
As historian Suzy Kim summarizes, Kim Il Sung "emerged from the purge as a definitive leader, not only for the bold move [of destroying the Purge Committee suspect files] but also for his compassion." Other Korean communists who escaped the purges also went on to hold leadership roles in North Korea.

Given that the united Korean and Chinese guerilla forces of the late 1930s were still recovering from the Minsaengdan incident, the legacy of the purges may help explain Korean communists' insistence on autonomy after the liberation of Korea, despite the close ties maintained with Chinese communists.
