= Gando Convention =

1909 treaty between Japan and China

The 1909 Gando Convention (traditional Chinese and Japanese: 間島協約; ; pinyin: Jiāndǎo Xiéyuē; Korean: 간도협약/間島協約) was a treaty signed between Imperial Japan and Qing China in which Japan recognized China's claims to Jiandao, called Gando in Korean, and Mount Paektu, and in return Japan received railroad concessions in Northeast China ("Manchuria"). After the Surrender of Japan, Gando Convention was de jure nullified. While China (then still divided between the Nationalist and Communist factions) took control of Manchuria and the northwestern half of Mt. Paektu, the Korean government north of the 38th Parallel (the present-day government of the DPRK or North Korea) took control of the southeastern half of Mt. Paektu in addition to taking control of the Korean Peninsula north of the 38th Parallel.

Gando/Jiandao is a historical border region along the north bank of the Tumen River in Jilin Province, Northeast China that has a high population of ethnic Koreans.

Many Koreans maintain a claim on Gando for they regard the Gando Convention treaty null and void, and because the area is still largely inhabited by Koreans.

== Background ==
Jiandao, or Gando in Korean, is today part of Northeastern China. Many different states and tribes succeeded one another in ruling the area during ancient times, including Korean states Buyeo, Goguryeo, and Balhae, followed later by the Khitans and the Jurchen Jin Dynasty.

Traditionally, the area was inhabited by nomadic tribes from the north and west, as well as Koreans and Chinese fleeing unrest, famine, or other sociopolitical conditions in their home countries. Eventually, it and much of the rest of Manchuria came under the control of the Manchus and later the Qing Dynasty. Gando itself, as it shared a border with Korea, was a particularly high-frequency destination for Koreans fleeing worsening conditions in the late Joseon dynasty after the early 1800s.

By the middle and the end of the 19th century, Koreans formed a majority of the population living in Gando, and when the Qing opened up Manchuria to Han Chinese migration in the 1870s and Gando in 1881, the large number of Korean already living there raised a boundary dispute issue that had been negotiated in 1712. An ambiguity in the characters used, was subject to some speculation, which was used by the Koreans living in Gando to claim that they were still on Korean soil.

While punishments for cross-border movement into northeast China by Han Chinese and Koreans by their respective governments (the Qing and Joseon) were on the books and Koreans apprehended in Gando were repatriated to Korea by Qing authorities, it is evident that these regulations did not deter people fleeing poor conditions, and they were able to make the claim in an attempt to escape relocation and punishment. The ambiguity in the original 1712 treaty gradually became official Joseon policy, but the issue itself did not come to a head until this time, when the Joseon Dynasty itself was in much turmoil and in no position to re-negotiate the boundary.

By the early 20th century, with increasing Japanese intervention in Korea, more Koreans fled to Gando, where they were sometimes welcomed by local Qing authorities, as a source of labor and agricultural know-how. Additionally, as a result of this consolidation of Japanese control over Korea (which would culminate with the Japan–Korea Treaty of 1910, with which Japan annexed Korea and began the Japanese occupation of Korea that ended in 1945), Korea was not able to renegotiate the renewed boundary issues with the Qing, which was having its own problems with Japanese and Western imperialism.

== Japanese interventions ==
By 1905, the Korean Empire was effectively a Japanese protectorate (see Eulsa Treaty). As a result of the Russo-Japanese War, which ended in the same year, Korea was fully surrounded and occupied by Japanese troops. The negotiations to end the war resulted in the Portsmouth Treaty, which stated, "Japan possesses in Korea paramount political, military, and economical [sic] interests" and with the Russian concessions to Japan effectively ensured a Japanese sphere of influence in northeast Asia.

In 1907, Japanese forces infiltrated the rather porous border between Korea and China. A few months later, the Japanese called the border issue "unsettled" because the majority of the population there was still ethnically Korean; as effective overlords of Korea, they claimed that Japan's jurisdiction over Korean subjects should extend into Gando, and invaded Gando in force in August 1907, which resulted in the Qing administration of China issuing a 13-point refutation asserting its claim to Jiandao.

As the Korean boundary dispute with China and the large population of ethnic Koreans in Gando was no secret to anyone in Northeast Asia, it is likely that the Japanese proposed the Gando Convention as a potential threat to continue pressing to claim Gando for Korea as a part of the Empire of Japan if the concessions by China to Japan listed in the Convention were not granted.

== Terms ==
Treaties and agreements, while often lopsided in that era (see unequal treaties), often at least nominally included concessions for all parties signing such agreements. Japan agreed to recognize Gando as Chinese territory and to withdraw its forces from there back into Korea within two months of the date of the agreement. In return, China conceded exclusive railroad rights in Manchuria to Japan, among other things. The convention also contained provisions for the protection and rights of ethnic Koreans under Chinese rule.

== Korean claims ==
The Korean claim is partly based on what is perceived (on the Korean side) to be an ambiguity in the 1712 boundary agreement between the Qing Dynasty (which ruled China at the time) and the Joseon Dynasty (which ruled Korea at the time); that actually did not become an issue again until about 150 years after the agreement was approved by both parties, when Manchuria and Gando was opened to Han Chinese migration by the Qing.

The other major part of the claim relies on the fact that by the time the Gando Convention was signed in 1909, the Korean Empire was not consulted and had no way of disputing the legitimacy of the treaty, as it was already a protectorate of the Empire of Japan and was essentially prevented from resolving or renegotiating the boundary dispute as an independent state.

The Gando Convention, like other unequal treaties (such as the Eulsa Treaty and the Japan–Korea Treaty of 1910) dealing with Korean territory/governance or claims made by Imperial Japan, should thus be revoked and the boundary dispute rectified between Korea (though there is no stated consensus on which of the two current Koreas should be party to this) and the People's Republic of China.

== In the modern era ==
When the Japanese occupation of Korea ended in August 1945, the Soviet administration in the north of Korea and the American administration in the south of Korea hampered any unified Korean attempt to recover Gando. However, Gando Convention was de jure nullified and North Korea started to control the area south of Paektu Mountain.

In 1961, PR China claimed a boundary dozens of kilometers south of Mt. Paekdu. North Korea protested by publishing a national map with the claim on Gando included. However, the North Korean claim on Gando and the Chinese claim on the area south of Gando Convention line were not very serious. The main disputed area was the area between Gando Convention line and Paektu Mountain.

Between 1962 and 1963, North Korea signed two treaties with China, which settled the boundary between the two at the Yalu/Amnok (Chinese/Korean names) and Tumen Rivers, and stipulated that around three-fifths of Heaven Lake at the peak of Mt. Baekdu would go to North Korea, and two-fifths to China.

However, the boundary between North Korea and the People's Republic of China continued to be contested, in spite of the 1963 agreement. In response to North Korea's perceived lack of support in the Sino-Soviet split, China demanded that North Korea cede its portion of the peak of Mt. Baekdu to China, and between March 1968 and March 1969, a number of border clashes between North Korean forces and Chinese forces took place in the Mt. Baekdu region. PR China wanted to restore the Gando Convention boundary. Chinese demands for the rest of Mt. Baekdu were eventually dropped in 1970 in order to repair relations between North Korea and China. China has recognized North Korea's sovereignty over some 80% of the islands in the Yalu/Amnok and Tumen Rivers, and also accepted North Korea's control of some 90% of the mouth of the Yalu/Amnok River. While not openly discussed anymore, it would appear that the 1963 agreement is only something of a framework and not exactly a binding contract for either North Korea or China.

South Korea did not recognize these agreements, but did not made a serious attempt to assert Korean sovereignty on Gando either. South Korea did not officially renounce its claim on Gando, but the Sino-Korean boundary on South Korean national map loosely follows the 1961 line except for Mt. Baekdu, and largely accepts this boundary on the map as de facto boundary.

In 2004, the South Korean government issued the following statement: "Our government takes the position that the 1909 Gando Convention, signed by Japan illegally without Korea's consent, is null and void, to the extent that the Eulsa Treaty, which deprived Korea of its diplomatic rights in 1905, is a null-and-void treaty obtained through duress." On October 22, 2004, South Korean foreign affairs minister Ban Ki-moon also remarked on the voiding of the Gando Convention. Ban also stated that "nullity of the Gando Convention does not automatically resolve Gando dispute and international politics harden our attempt to resolve Gando dispute"

== See also ==
- China–North Korea border
- Sino–North Korean Border Treaty
