= List of short-lived states and dependencies =

Azawad (2012 – 2013) is an example of a short-lived state.

This article provides a comprehensive list of countries, dependencies, political and territorial entities, anarchist regions, autonomous areas and provisional governments that existed for five years or less. These short-lived entities emerged and disappeared under a variety of circumstances.

In some cases, newly established states were overthrown by coups (e.g., the Kingdom of Tunisia), while others were formed during failed revolutionary movements (e.g., the Democratic Republic of Yemen). Additionally, some entities were created as puppet states during wartime (e.g., Napoleon's Sister Republics) or existed as provisional governments (e.g., the Provisional Government of Hawaii).

The diverse nature of these political formations reflects the complexity of state formation and dissolution in times of rapid political change.

== Criteria for inclusion ==
Each listed state:

- Has lasted five years or less.
- Has been dated since 1 CE.
- Has had de facto control over a territory or a significant portion of its territory.
- Has had some sort of governance or attempted administration over their territory.

== Africa ==
| Name | Date | Capital | Now part of | Description |
|---|---|---|---|---|
| Republic of Swellendam | 1795 | Swellendam | South Africa | One of the first of many Boer Republics who declared independence from the Dutch Cape Colony in the late 18th and early 19th century. Founded by Dutch colonists in the frontier south-western area around the town of Swellendam, who were unhappy with the rule of the Dutch East India Company and revolted, removing the town's incumbent magistrate Anthonie Faure and replacing him with the newly elected president Hermanus Steyn. However, after the British Invasion of the Cape Colony, the majority of the fledgling republic's territory was absorbed into the Cape Colony. |
| Republic of Graaff-Reinet | 1795–1796 | Graaff-Reinet | South Africa | Another Boer republic on the frontier of the Dutch Cape Colony, this time centred around the town of Graaff-Reinet. Founded due to disputes between farmers and the government over lawlessness in the frontier zones, resulting in a new magistrate being appointed and the inhabitants suffering oppression under the Dutch East India Company. In 1795, when Swellendam declared independence, Graaff-Reinet followed their example and declared themselves a republic. After the Invasion of the Cape Colony, the republic resisted occupation by the British for over a year before it was finally conquered. |
| Islands of Refreshment | 1811–1816 | Reception | United Kingdom | Declared by American whaler Jonathan Lambert and four others, who were the first permanent inhabitants of the modern day Tristan da Cunha islands in the South Atlantic. Lambert declared himself the sovereign of the islands. Annexed in 1816 by the Cape Colony under the United Kingdom to prevent France from obtaining the islands. |
| Mississippi-in-Africa | 1837–1842 | ? | Liberia | Founded in the 1830s by the Mississippi Colonization Society of the United States and settled by American free people of color, many of them former slaves. Ultimately absorbed into Liberia in the 1840s. |
| Natalia Republic | 1839–1843 | Pietermaritzburg | South Africa | Established in 1839 by local Afrikaans-speaking Voortrekkers after the Battle of Blood River. This Boer Republic lasted for four years before being annexed by British troops under George Napier. |
| Republic of Winburg-Potchefstroom | 1844–1848 | Potchefstroom, Winburg | South Africa | Formed from the union of the Potchefstroom Republic and the Winburg Republic in 1838; the nation lasted until Winburg was annexed by the United Kingdom, while Potchefstroom became one of the founders of the South African Republic. |
| Republic of Klip River | 1847–1848 | Ladysmith | South Africa | After buying land from the Zulu king Mpande, a group of Boers settled in an area now known as Ladysmith, KwaZulu-Natal; led by their leader Andries Spies, they declared the Republic of the Klip River, later annexed by the UK the same year. |
| Republic of Maryland | 1834–1857 | Harper | Liberia | An African American settlement in West Africa founded by the Maryland State Colonization Society in 1834 as a private colony. The colony transitioned to a republic following an independence referendum in 1853. The endeavour was racked by incompetency, disease, poor locations and natives, and it joined Liberia in 1857 as the Maryland County. |
| Lydenburg Republic | 1856–1860 | Lydenburg | South Africa | A Boer republic which was created following the dissolution of the Potchefstroom Republic. Eventually, this nation expanded with the inclusion of the Utrecht Republic in 1858. The republic lasted until 1860, when it was incorporated into the South African Republic. |
| Klipdrift Republic | 1870–1871 | Klipdrift | South Africa | A Boer republic declared in Griqualand West by Stafford Parker. |
| State of Goshen | 1882–1883 | Rooigrond; Mafikeng | South Africa | A Boer republic that later merged with the Republic of Stellaland. |
| Republic of Stellaland | 1882–1883 | Vryburg | South Africa | A Boer republic that, for its short existence, was an important factor in the lead up to the Second Boer War. It later merged with the State of Goshen to become the United States of Stellaland. |
| United States of Stellaland | 1883 | Vryburg | South Africa | A Boer republic created from the union of the neighboring Republic of Stellaland and State of Goshen. The republic lasted until it became a protectorate of the South African Republic on 10 September 1884, only to be annexed 6 days later. |
| Republic of Lijdensrust | 1885–1887 | Grootfontein | Namibia | A Boer republic in the area of present-day Namibia. Declared on 20 October 1885. Originally named Upingtonia, but its name was changed soon after, as the reason for its original name proved worthless. In 1887, it was merged into German South-West Africa. |
| Nieuwe Republiek | 1884–1888 | Vryheid | South Africa | Created on 16 August 1884 with land donated by the Zulus through a treaty. The territory was part of the old Boer Republic of Natalia. The republic enjoyed independence until it was annexed by the South African Republic at its own request. |
| Klein Vrystaat | 1886–1891 | Vaalkop Farm | South Africa | A Boer republic which declared independence from lands formerly controlled by the Swazi king Mswati II. It was eventually incorporated into the South African Republic in 1891 at its own request. |
| South African Republic | 1914–1915 | Pretoria | South Africa | A failed attempt to recreate the South African Republic during the pro-German Maritz rebellion. The spark for this rebellion was the killing of former Boer general Koos de la Rey by the South African Police. Upon the news of De la Rey's killing, rebellion leader Manie Maritz issued a proclamation declaring the South African Republic. Within a short period of time, the rebels had gathered over 15,000 men. However, this was not enough to resist the forces of Louis Botha, who destroyed the rebellion and forced Maritz into exile in German South West Africa. |
| Tripolitanian Republic | 1918–1919 | ʽAziziya | Libya | A republic proclaimed following the Paris Peace Conference by various local sheiks, specifically a tetrarchy composed of Sulayman al-Baruni, Ramadan Asswehly, Abd al-Nabi Bilkhayr and Ahmad al-Murayid. Occupying the areas of Italian Tripolitania that were controlled by local forces (most of the area outside of Tripoli and the coastline), the republic lasted until Victor Emmanuel III issued a decree granting the native inhabitants of Libya Italian citizenship among other guarantees. This decree was enough to bring the leaders to the negotiating table, and they dissolved the republic. |
| Republic of the Rif | 1921–1926 | Ajdir | Morocco | A Riffian and Jebala state founded during the Rif War, a brutal war of attrition that saw Spain use chemical weapons for the first time and the eventual collapse of the Republic. |
| Emirate of Cyrenaica | 1949–1951 | Benghazi | Libya | A Senussi emirate backed by the United Kingdom in the Cyrenaica region and later Tripolitania, the areas of the British Military Administration in Libya, founded by Sayyid Idris with himself as emir. However, under United Nations pressure, the British Military Administration and the French Military Administration in Fezzan merged into a single state, the Kingdom of Libya, with Idris as its King. |
| Republic of Egypt | 1953–1958 | Cairo | Egypt, Sudan, South Sudan, Palestine | A revolutionary state established by Mohamed Naguib and other members of the Free Officers Movement after they overthrew the Kingdom of Egypt and the Alawiyya dynasty. Despite the Republic's short existence, many momentous events occurred, including the Suez Crisis and the independence of the Republic of Sudan. In 1958, a referendum was held concerning the plans to unite Egypt and Syria into a single pan-Arabist state. The referendum passed in both countries, which were united into the United Arab Republic. |
| Kingdom of Tunisia | 1956–1957 | Tunis | Tunisia` | A monarchy ruled by the Bey of Tunis, Muhammad VIII al-Amin, founded at the end of the French protectorate period and lasting until the National Constituent Assembly voted to abolish the monarchy and establish the Republic of Tunisia. |
| Mali Federation | 1959–1960 | Dakar | Senegal & Mali | A member of the French Community until it broke into Senegal and Mali. |
| (Somalia) State of Somaliland | 1960 | Hargeisa | Somaliland (De Facto) Somalia (De Jure) | Existed for five days before merging with the Trust Territory of Somaliland to form the Somali Republic. |
| Free Republic of the Congo | 1960–1962 | Stanleyville | Democratic Republic of the Congo | A breakaway state established during the Congo Crisis. |
| South Kasai | 1960–1962 | Bakwanga | Democratic Republic of the Congo | A semi-independent Luba state in south-eastern Congo. Inspired by the secession of Katanga, nationalist Albert Kalonji declared independence from the First Congolese Republic. The diamond- and natural resource-rich region was supported by the former colonisers of the Congo, Belgium and the secessionist Katanga. Belgian support helped the state continue the status quo even in the face of a Congolese offensive. However, in 1961, Kalonji proclaimed himself monarch of South Kasai, dividing the secessionist movement, and was arrested later that year. The state finally ended with a military coup d'état in 1962. |
| State of Katanga | 1960–1963 | Élisabethville | Democratic Republic of the Congo | A breakaway state that proclaimed its independence from Congo-Léopoldville on 11 July 1960 under Moïse Tshombe, leader of the local Confédération des associations tribales du Katanga (CONAKAT) political party. The new Katangese state did not enjoy full support throughout the province and was constantly plagued by ethnic strife in its northernmost region. It was dissolved in 1963 following an invasion by United Nations Operation in the Congo (ONUC) forces, and reintegrated with the rest of the country as Katanga Province. |
| Dominion of Uganda | 1962–1963 | Kampala | Uganda | After Uganda was granted independence, the British monarch, Elizabeth II, remained head of state as Queen of Uganda for precisely one year. |
| Dominion of Kenya | 1963–1964 | Nairobi | Kenya | After Kenya was granted independence, the British monarch, Elizabeth II, remained head of state as Queen of Kenya. |
| First Nigerian Republic | 1963–1966 | Lagos | Nigeria | After the independence of Nigeria, the First Nigerian Republic took over; it was disposed of after a military coup three years later. |
| People's Republic of Zanzibar | 1964 | Zanzibar City | Tanzania | After the overthrow of the Sultan of Zanzibar by the African nationalist Afro-Shirazi Party, the revolutionaries led by Abeid Karume abolished the Sultanate of Zanzibar and established a people's republic. The revolution ended with the massacre and expulsion of the Arab minority population. The People's Republic merged with the also-socialist Tanganyika, fearing the growing rise of the radical communist Umma Party led by John Okello. |
| Rhodesia | 1964–1965 | Harare | Zimbabwe | A British protectorate. |
| People's Republic of the Congo | 1964–1967 | Stanleyville | Democratic Republic of the Congo | A rival government formed by Simba rebels after the capture of Stanleyville during the Simba Rebellion. The socialist state was put down after Operation Dragon Rouge, an operation by Belgium and the United States to rescue hostages held by the rebels and capture the city. This raid coincided with the push of Congolese forces into the territory held by the rebels, slowly crushing them. |
| Niger Delta Republic | 1966 | ? | Nigeria | A state declared by Isaac Adaka Boro, a soldier and Niger Delta activist. |
| Republic of Benin | 1967 | Benin City | Nigeria | A Biafran puppet state set up in the Nigerian city of Benin City. |
| Republic of Biafra | 1967–1970 | Enugu (1967); Umuahia (1967–1969); Owerri (1969–1970); Awka (1970) | Nigeria | Declared independence from Nigeria and existed from 1967 to 1970. Its territory consisted of the former Eastern Region. |
| Nile Provisional Government | 1969–1970 | Juba | South Sudan | Formed out of the failed Southern Sudan provisional government as an attempt to rebrand the nation from South Sudan to the Nile Republic. |
| Martyazo | 1972 | Commune of Vugizo | Burundi | A secessionist state established by Hutu rebels in the Commune of Vugizo. |
| Republic of Cabinda | 1975–1976 | Cabinda | Angola | A separatist state, declared by Cabindan nationalist groups the Liberation Front of the State of Cabinda and the Front for the Liberation of the Enclave of Cabinda after Angolan independence. |
| Democratic People's Republic of Angola | 1975–1976 | Huambo (de jure) Jamba (de facto) | Angola | A rival government to that of the People's Republic of Angola during the nation's civil war. |
| Zimbabwe Rhodesia | 1979–1980 | Salisbury | Zimbabwe | A transitional government established by the British to transfer authority from Rhodesia to Zimbabwe. |
| People's Democratic Republic of Ethiopia | 1987–1991 | Addis Ababa | Ethiopia, Eritrea | A communist state succeeding the Derg, after the leaders of the junta decided to replace the military dictatorship with a "civilian" one. The Republic was the pet project and brainchild of Derg chairman Mengistu Haile Mariam, with him and other members of the junta controlling the only political party in the country, the Workers' Party of Ethiopia. However, the People's Democratic Republic was ravaged by the 1983–1985 famine, and when the Soviet Union withdrew support for the regime, the Ethiopian Civil War and the Eritrean War of Independence began and ended with the fall of the Derg regime. |
| Provisional Government of Eritrea | 1991–1993 | ? | Eritrea | A de facto independent state from 1991 until 1993. |
| "Taylorland" or Greater Liberia | 1990–1994/5 | Gbarnga | Liberia | One of the most powerful rebel leaders in Liberia, Charles Taylor, set up his own domain in a way resembling an actual state: he reorganised his militia into a military-like organisation (split into the Army, Marines, Navy, and Executive Mansion Guard), established his de facto capital at Gbarnga, and created a civilian government and justice system under his control that were supposed to enforce law and order. The area under his control was commonly called "Taylorland" or "Greater Liberia" and even became somewhat stable and peaceful until it largely disintegrated in 1994/5. |
| Mohéli | 1997–1998 | Fomboni | Comoros | Along with Anjouan in 1997, it seceded from the Comoros. Anjouan lasted until 2002, and Mohéli agreed to return to the union in 1998. |
| Jubaland | 1998–1999 | Bu'ale | Somalia | During the Somali civil war, General Mohammed Said Hersi Morgan declared the independence of Jubaland. |
| Maakhir | 2007–2009 | Badhan | Somalia | A self-proclaimed state of Somalia founded by members of the Warsangali clan in the area between the state of Puntland and the unrecognized nation of Somaliland. The state was plagued with difficulties from the start, including a lack of administration and a lack of ways to economically sustain itself. In 2009, it was reabsorbed into Puntland. |
| Republic of Azania | 2011–2013 | Dhobley; Garbahare | Somalia | A republic which claimed sovereignty over the Somali state of Jubaland. Following the capture of most of Jubaland by the Islamic militant group al-Shaabab, Kenya launched a counteroffensive and aided in setting up the republic from the former Jubaland administration. The action was condemned by Somalia. Azania reformed back into the Jubaland State of Somalia in 2013. |
| Azawad | 2012 | Timbuktu (proclaimed); Gao (provisional) | Mali | A secessionist state declared by the National Movement for the Liberation of Azawad in northern Mali during the Tuareg rebellion. |

== Americas ==
| Name | Date | Capital | Now part of | Description |
|---|---|---|---|---|
| State of Franklin | 1784–1788 | Jonesborough, Greeneville | United States | The American Revolutionary War left the Confederation Congress heavily in debt. To help offset this, the state of North Carolina offered to cede an area called the Western Counties, a group of counties on the frontier, to the direct control of Congress. The settlers, fearing that Congress could be desperate enough to sell the land to a foreign power such as the French or Spanish, and seeing North Carolina's hesitation to intervene on their behalf, declared themselves a separate state of the union. When Congress rejected their statehood bid, the area began operating as a de facto independent republic. The state came to a protracted end after conflict with Cherokee; the inhabitants withdrew their support for the separate state, and in 1788 the state was assimilated back into North Carolina. |
| Trans-Oconee Republic | 1794 | ? | United States | An independent state west of the Oconee River (in the state of Georgia). Established by General Elijah Clarke in May 1794, it was an attempt to head off the new federal government's ceding of lands claimed by Georgia back to the Creek. In September 1794, state and federal troops forced Clarke and his followers to surrender and leave the settlements. |
| State of Muskogee | 1799–1802 | Mikasuke | United States | A Native American state in Spanish Florida, consisting of several tribes of Creeks and Seminoles. It disappeared when the Spaniards captured its founder, William Augustus Bowles, and removed him to a prison in Cuba. |
| Quito Republic | 1809–1812 | Quito | Ecuador | An anti-Spanish movement in the Real Audiencia of Quito, known in Latin America as the First Cry of Hispanic American Independence. |
| Republic of West Florida | 1810 | St. Francisville | United States | An unrecognized republic in Spanish West Florida, nowadays the south-eastern corner of Louisiana, for just over two and a half months during 1810. The Republic's short existence began when American settlers in Spanish West Florida captured Fort San Carlos in Baton Rouge, and ended when it was occupied and annexed by the United States. |
| Supreme Junta of Caracas | 1810 | Caracas | Venezuela | The transitional government of the Captaincy General of Venezuela following the deposal of Vicente Emparán, which marked the beginning of the Venezuelan War of Independence. The Junta ended when the First Republic of Venezuela was founded. |
| Supreme Governing Junta of Santa Fe in New Granada | 1810–1811 | Bogotá | Colombia | A temporary autonomous junta created in the capital of the Viceroyalty of New Granada during the Napoleonic Wars, in order to rule the colonial provinces of New Granada in the name of the captive monarch Ferdinand VII. It later proclaimed independence as the Free State of Cundinamarca. |
| First Republic of Venezuela | 1811–1812 | Valencia | Venezuela | The first independent government of Venezuela, lasting from 5 July 1811 to 25 July 1812. |
| Free and Independent State of Cundinamarca | 1811–1816 | Bogotá | Colombia | A rebel state in colonial Colombia. It included parts of the former New Kingdom of Granada. Its capital was Bogotá, the former capital of the Viceroyalty of New Granada. |
| Republic of East Florida | 1812 | Amelia Island | United States | A putative republic declared by insurgents against the Spanish rule of East Florida. |
| First Republic of Texas | 1812–1813 | San Antonio | United States | A joint Mexican-American filibustering expedition against Spanish Texas led by Bernardo Gutiérrez de Lara that defeated a Spanish force at the Battle of Rosillo Creek and declared independence, with Gutiérrez as governor. However, the Spanish captured San Antonio and conducted brutal reprisals against the Texan Republicans. In the Battle of Medina, the filibusters fought to the death with over 1,300 casualties. |
| Second Republic of Venezuela | 1813–1814 | Caracas | Venezuela | In the aftermath of Simón Bolívar's defeat of Juan Domingo de Monteverde and the Royalists in the Admirable Campaign, Bolívar declared his home country of Venezuela independent. However, the republic came to an end when Caracas was reconquered by the Royalists a year after independence. |
| Free State of Mariquita | 1814–1816 | Mariquita | Colombia | During the Peninsular War, between Spain and Napoleonic France, many of the Spanish colonies in Latin America were left to their own devices. This led to the formation of provisional 'juntas' and the growth of separatist sentiment. One of these 'juntas' led the Mariquita Province of central Colombia, who declared their independence in 1814 and joined the United Provinces of New Granada in the same year as an autonomous state. After the Peninsular War had ended, the Spanish set about reconquering the rebellious colonies, successfully defeating Mariquita and the rest of the United Provinces in 1816. |
| Federal League | 1815–1820 | Montevideo | Uruguay; Argentina; Brazil | A confederation of provinces of the United Provinces of the Río de la Plata led by José Gervasio Artigas, who had grown disillusioned with the system of central government. Artigas conquered the city of Montevideo and declared a confederation with the support of many other states. The advent of the League caused the Argentine Civil War between the Federalists and the Unitarians in Buenos Aires. The result was a defeat for the Federalists, but the league is considered the predecessor of the modern state of Uruguay. |
| Republic of the Floridas | 1817 | Fernandina Beach | United States | An attempt, from June to December 1817, to establish an independent Florida. It was led by Gregor MacGregor, a Scottish military adventurer, joined by French adventurer and soldier of fortune Louis-Michel Aury and Scot Richard Ambrister, whose execution by General Andrew Jackson shortly thereafter provoked an international incident. MacGregor conquered Amelia Island, the only territory the country consisted of, and raised the Green Cross of Florida flag over the Spanish Fort San Carlos. |
| Pernambuco | 1817 | Recife | Brazil | A separatist revolt in the northeastern Brazilian Captaincy of Pernambuco, led by the Masonic lodges of the area. The revolt is significant because it was the first attempt at establishing an independent government in Brazil. Though the revolutionaries experienced early gains, after two months their capital of Recife was surrounded and the rebel government was dismantled. |
| Republic of Texas | 1819 | Nacogdoches | United States | A filibustering expedition led by Eli Harris, who crossed the Sabine River with 120 men and captured Nacogdoches. James Long followed two weeks later with an additional 75 men. On June 22, the combined force declared a new government, with Long as president and a 21-member Supreme Council. The following day, they issued a declaration of independence modeled on the that of the United States. However, the expedition soon crumbled beneath the advancing Spanish army. Long fled to Louisiana and attempted another incursion in 1821, but was captured and killed. |
| Republic of Entre Ríos | 1820–1821 | Concepción del Uruguay | Argentina | A republic comprising what are today the Argentinian provinces of Entre Ríos and Corrientes, it was founded by Governor Francisco Ramírez not for the sake of Entrerriano independence from Argentina, but for greater autonomy for the region in response to the centralization policies of Buenos Aires. |
| Republic of Tucumán | 1820–1821 | San Miguel de Tucumán | Argentina | After the Battle of Cepeda and the defeat of the Unitarians at the hands of the Federalists, Governor Bernabé Aráoz of the Tucumán Province declared Tucumán independent as a republic, expecting to be incorporated into the newly reformed United Provinces of the Río de la Plata, but as the year progressed, the fledgling republic slowly began to push for full independence. Soon the federal government sent Alejandro Heredia to recapture the republic; it fell to the combined elements of Heredia's assault and infighting between its divisions. |
| Free Province of Guayaquil | 1820–1822 | Guayaquil | Ecuador | After the success of the October 9 Revolution in the city of Guayaquil, the revolutionaries under José Joaquín de Olmedo declared a provisional government in the liberated areas. In July 1822, Simon Bolívar lead a coup d'état and declared himself 'Supreme Leader' because he viewed Guayaquil as the gateway to liberating Peru, and it was soon annexed by Gran Colombia. |
| Zulia | 1821 | Maracaibo | Venezuela | After the secession of the Third Republic of Venezuela from the Spanish Empire, the council of the province of Maracaibo declared the province's independence as a self-governing entity of the Spanish Empire and renamed themselves Zulia. |
| Isthmus of Panama | 1821 | Panama City | Panama | Briefly independent before joining Gran Colombia. |
| Republic of Spanish Haiti | 1821–1822 | Santo Domingo | Haiti | An unrecognized breakaway state that succeeded the Captaincy General of Santo Domingo after independence was declared on 1 December 1821 by José Núñez de Cáceres. The republic lasted only from 1 December 1821 to 9 February 1822, when it was annexed by the Republic of Haiti. |
| Protectorate of San Martin | 1821–1822 | Lima | Peru | A protectorate of the United Provinces of the Río de la Plata formed after the liberation of Peru by Chilean and Argentinian forces led by General José de San Martín, who was proclaimed Protector of Peru. After San Martín left Peru, the protectorate was reorganized into the Supreme Governing Junta. |
| Independent Republic of Hualqui | 1823 | Hualqui | Chile | During the War to the Death waged by remnants of Royalist forces, the inhabitants of the town of Hualqui were repeatedly raided by the Royalist Montoneras led by Vicente Benavides; despite many attempts to plead for aid, the government of the Province of Concepción refused to provide support. The inhabitants of Hualqui and the neighbouring communes of Rere and San Rosendo declared their independence; the central administration in Concepción did not react well to the declaration and two days later, a contingent of soldiers crushed the secessionists. |
| United Provinces of Central America | 1823–1824 | Guatemala City | Central America | A precursor of the Federal Republic of Central America formed after the United Provinces' separation from the First Mexican Empire and dissolved after the adoption of the new constitution. |
| Provisional Government of Mexico | 1823–1824 | Mexico City | Mexico | A transitional entity established in the aftermath of the fall of the First Mexican Empire to facilitate the transition from a monarchy to a republic. The Provisional Government lasted until October 1824, when the 1824 Constitution of Mexico was adopted and the new president Guadalupe Victoria was elected. |
| Confederation of the Equator | 1824 | Recife? | Brazil | Another rebellion in the Captaincy of Pernambuco, again led by former participants of the Pernambucan revolt—namely Frei Caneca and Manoel de Carvalho—who opposed the authoritarian and centrist policies of Emperor Pedro I of Brazil in the aftermath of the Night of Agony attack on the 1823 Brazilian Constituent Assembly, which Caneca and the others supported. The rebellion was quickly overwhelmed due to a lack of support from the inhabitants, and Caneca and Carvalho were executed. |
| State of Upper Peru | 1825 | La Paz | Bolivia | Established by the Bolivian Declaration of Independence, later renamed the Republic of Bolivar. |
| Republic of Bolivar | 1825 | La Paz | Bolivia | Led by Simón Bolívar and later Antonio José de Sucre; soon became the Republic of Bolivia. |
| Republic of Madawaska | 1827 | ? | Canada | A putative republic in the northwest corner of Madawaska County, New Brunswick founded by settler John Baker, who fervently believed Madawaska to be a part of the US state of Maine and, with the 15 other American families who lived in the settlement, declared independence from Lower Canada. Baker was soon arrested and jailed for nine months. The Republic was one of the reasons for the Aroostook War, which defined the eastern American-Canadian border. |
| Republic of Alto Perú | 1828 | La Paz | Bolivia | When the Peruvian–Bolivian War of 1828 was coming to an end, Bolivian troops led by Pedro Blanco Soto and José Ramón de Loayza in the province of La Paz, sympathetic to Peru, mutinied and declared independence. The capture and murder of Blanco Soto and the arrest of Loayza spelled the end of the ill-fated republic. |
| (Colombia) United Government of Casanare | 1830–1831 | Pore | Colombia | During the dissolution of Gran Colombia, the Casanare Province led by General Juan Nepomuceno Moreno seceded from Gran Colombia, wishing to join the newly independent State of Venezuela. Their offer of annexation was rejected by the Valencia Congress, as the move would have been considered a hostile act by the central government in Bogotá. |
| Republic of Indian Stream | 1832–1835 | Pittsburg | United States | A breakaway republic founded by the inhabitants of a stretch of the Canada–United States border that was disputed between both nations. The inhabitants of the area were then doubly taxed by both British and American tax collectors; in reaction to this, the residents declared themselves independent until the dispute was resolved. In 1835, the republic was annexed by New Hampshire, though this did not resolve the border dispute and became an international incident. |
| Cabano Government | 1835–1840 | Belém | Brazil | A popular revolution and pro-separatist movement that occurred in the then-province of Grão-Pará, Empire of Brazil. |
| Peruvian Republic | 1837 | Lima & Arequipa | Peru | A Chilean puppet state led by Antonio Gutiérrez de la Fuente during the War of the Confederation. The republic was soon dissolved when its forces were encircled by the Peruvians and forced to sign the Treaty of Paucarpata. |
| Republic of Canada | 1837–1838 | Navy Island | Canada | The Republic of Canada was a government proclaimed by William Lyon Mackenzie on December 5, 1837. The self-proclaimed government was established on Navy Island. |
| Bahia Republic | 1837–1838 | Salvador | Brazil | An anti-slavery secessionist revolt by army mutineers led by Francisco Sabino. The uprising started with early success when the contingent sent by the Brazilian government to deal with the rebels defected and, with the support of the defectors, captured the city of Salvador. The city was soon besieged and the republic fell; the leaders of the revolt fled to fight in the Ragamuffin War or were exiled to remote areas of Mato Grosso. |
| State of Los Altos | 1837–1840 | Quetzaltenango | Guatemala | The United Provinces of Central America were riven by strife for much of their existence. Guatemala’s ruling class was appalled by the thought of an illiterate and brutish peasant Governor Rafael Carrera and led the six western provinces into secession. The new state of Los Altos, under Liberal leadership, appealed for recognition to the UPCA. In January 1840, Carrera reconquered Los Altos and then defeated the UPCA's army in March, sounding the death knell for the United Provinces. Los Altos rebelled again when Carrera declared Guatemala an independent republic in 1847, but was again rapidly crushed. |
| Republic of Lower Canada | 1838 | Napierville | Canada | A breakaway state proclaimed in the aftermath of the Rebellions of 1837–1838. |
| Peruvian Republic | 1838–1839 | Lima | Peru | A state encompassing the entirety of the state of North Peru that seceded from the Peru–Bolivian Confederation during the War of the Confederation. The leaders of the new state soon reached an agreement with Andrés de Santa Cruz and the republic was reabsorbed into the Confederation as an autonomous republic. |
| Juliana Republic | 1839 | Laguna | Brazil | A state formed in the province of Santa Catarina by the spillover of the Ragamuffin War in the nearby province of Rio Grande do Sul, where the Riograndense Republic was already established. In four months, the capital of Laguna was encircled and the leaders surrendered. |
| Republic of the Rio Grande | 1840 | Laredo | United States | One of a series of political movements in what was then the Centralist Republic of Mexico, which sought to become independent from the authoritarian unitary government of Antonio López de Santa Anna. |
| State of Isthmus | 1840–1841 | Panama City | Panama | A failed attempt to separate Panama from Colombia. It was recognized by Costa Rica. |
| First Republic of Tabasco | 1841–1842 | Villahermosa | Mexico | A separatist state founded in the southern Mexican state of Tabasco as a reaction towards certain changes in government. The First Republic was proclaimed during an uprising against the newly formed Centralist Republic of Mexico by citizens seeking a federal state. Infighting between other allied states and negotiations with the Mexican government persuaded the government of the Republic to rejoin Mexico in return for higher autonomy. |
| Republic of Yucatán | 1841–1843, 1846–1848 | Mérida | Mexico | A state from 1841 to 1848, it was proclaimed after the Mexican government tried to centralize and ally with the US during the Mexican–American War; it was rejected and joined a federal Mexico after the war ended. A revolt in Yucatán in 1916, led by Felipe Cerillo but with active Mayan involvement, effectively separated the region from the weak Mexican state. On 3 April 1916, Carillo declared the independence of the Socialist Republic of Yucatan, but the Republic failed to garner much support and was quickly overrun by Mexican forces. |
| Second Republic of Tabasco | 1845 | Villahermosa | Mexico | The second attempt at Tabascan succession from the centralized Mexican government, declared when Commander General Ignacio Martínez de Pinillos overthrew Tabascan state governor José Víctor Jiménez. Juan de Dios Salazar formed an opposition government that sought reintegration of Tabasco with Mexico. Ultimately, General Miguel Bruno invaded Tabasco and reinstalled Jiménez as governor, thus ending the short-lived republic. |
| California Republic | 1846 | ? | United States | Unrecognized breakaway state from Mexico that existed from June 14, 1846, to July 9, 1846. It militarily controlled an area north of San Francisco in and around what is now Sonoma County in California. |
| Third Republic of Tabasco | 1846 | Villahermosa | Mexico | The third Tabasqueño republic. It was founded after forces led by Colonel Juan Bautista Traconis repelled an American incursion into Tabasco that was attempting to annex it. After the American forces retreated Traconis urged the Mexican government for aid, fearing that another America assault was imminent. When the Mexican government refused to provide aid Traconis declared the secession of Tabasco. However facing economic pressure from the central government and civil unrest, Traconis handed over command to Justo Santa Anna who reincorporated the region back into Mexico. |
| State of Deseret | 1848–1849 | Salt Lake City | United States | Proposed state of the United States promoted by leaders of the Church of Jesus Christ of Latter-day Saints, who had founded settlements in what is today the state of Utah. A provisional state government operated for nearly two years in 1849–50, but was never recognized by the US government. |
| State of Los Altos | 1848–1849 | Quetzaltenango | Guatemala, Mexico | An unrecognized state led by military officers from Quetzaltenango after the independence of Guatemala from the Federal Republic of Central America. The area had been a hotbed for separatist and revolutionary movements, and the tense geopolitical situation within Guatemala led General Agustín Guzmán to declare the independence of Los Altos from Guatemala. The state was dissolved following Guzmán's arrest and eventual death. |
| The Great Republic of Rough and Ready | 1850 | Rough and Ready | United States | The town declared its secession from the United States as The Great Republic of Rough and Ready on 7 April 1850, largely to avoid mining taxes, but voted to rejoin the Union less than three months later on 4 July. |
| Republic of Sonora | 1853–1854 | La Paz | Mexico | An unrecognized federal republic ruled by filibuster William Walker in 1854. It was based in Baja California and also claimed (but never controlled) Sonora. |
| Republic of Baja California | 1853–1854 | La Paz | Mexico | Proposed state from 1853 to 1854 after American private military leader William Walker failed to invade Sonora from Arizona. Walker wanted to appropriate Sonora, and his claims had both the support of tycoons and government complacency in the United States. |
| Provisional Government of Atacama | 1859 | Copiapo | Chile | A parallel government established by the Liberal rebels during the 1859 Chilean revolution. Though the provisional government was well organised and projects were accomplished in a short amount of time, most notably the introduction of their own currency the Peso constituyente, the rebels were swiftly defeated by the Conservative forces, and their leader Pedro León Gallo Goyenechea was exiled to Argentina. |
| Sovereign State of Quindío | 1860 | Cartago | Colombia | A brief attempt at secession by the Quindío Department against the central government of New Granada. Lasted from January to August of that year. |
| Kingdom of Araucanía and Patagonia | 1860–1862 | Perquenco | Argentina and Chile | Set up by a French adventurer who tried to gain legitimacy for his state, only to be denied. The self-proclaimed kingdom was mostly legal fiction and only loosely controlled a small portion of the territory it claimed. In fact, the Mapuche warlords that submitted to it were totally autonomous and used the kingdom only as pretext to obtain foreign support. It was conquered and partitioned by Chile and Argentina. |
| South Carolina | 1861 | Columbia | United States | A secessionist state established on December 20, 1860, when South Carolina became the first state to secede from the United States. It lasted a month and a half before becoming a founding member of the Confederate States of America. |
| Alabama | 1861 | Montgomery | United States | A secessionist republic declared on January 11, 1861 when Alabama seceded from the United States. It only lasted a month before becoming a founding member of the Confederate States of America. |
| Louisiana | 1861 | Baton Rouge, Opelousas, Shreveport | United States | A secessionist state formed on January 11, 1861, when Louisiana seceded from the United States. It only lasted a month before joining the Confederate States of America on February 8, 1861. |
| North Carolina | 1861 | Raleigh | United States | A secessionist government of North Carolina; joined the Confederacy on May 21, 1861. |
| Tennessee | 1861 | Nashville | United States | A secessionist government of Tennessee; joined the Confederacy on July 2, 1861. |
| Mississippi | 1861 | Jackson | United States | A secessionist state established January 9, 1861 when Mississippi seceded from the United States. It only lasted a month before joining the Confederate States of America. |
| Virginia | 1861 | Richmond | United States | A secessionist government of Virginia; joined the Confederacy on May 7, 1861. |
| Florida | 1861 | Tallahassee | United States | A secessionist state established January 10, 1861, when Florida seceded from the United States. It only lasted a month before being a founding member of the Confederate States of America. |
| Texas | 1861 | Austin | United States | Texas seceded from the United States on February 1, 1861, and lasted as an independent state for a month before joining the Confederate States of America. Not to be confused with the earlier (1836–1845), partially recognized Republic of Texas. |
| Kingdom of Callaway | 1861 | Fulton | United States | The Kingdom of Callaway was a county in Missouri that did not agree with the politics of either side in the American Civil War. As a result, it went independent for a time. What made Callaway unique was that Union general John B. Henderson signed a peace treaty with the Kingdom in October 1861, thus lending legitimacy to its existence. |
| Confederate States of America | 1861–1865 | Montgomery, Alabama (until May 29, 1861); Richmond, Virginia (until April 2–3, 1865); Danville, Virginia (until April 10, 1865); Greensboro, North Carolina (until May 5, 1865) | United States | An unrecognized breakaway republic in the Southern United States from 1861 to 1865, comprising eleven U.S. states that declared secession. Fought and lost to the United States in the American Civil War. |
| Confederate government of Kentucky | 1861–1865 | Bowling Green, Frankfort | United States | Kentucky's shadow government, formed in opposition to the Union. |
| Confederate government of Missouri | 1861–1865 | Neosho | United States | Missouri's shadow government, formed in opposition to the Union. |
| Confederate government of West Virginia | 1861–1865 | ? | United States | West Virginia's shadow government, formed in opposition to the Union. |
| Free State of Jones | 1863–1865 | Laurel | United States | A Unionist government of Jones County, Mississippi, a state that had seceded and joined the Confederate States of America. A small militia set up by the inhabitants made Confederate tax collection nearly impossible. The Free State ended after the defeat of the Confederates. |
| Republic of Puerto Rico | 1868 & 1897 | Lares | United States | Two nationalist rebellions against the Spanish Empire staged by the Revolutionary Committee of Puerto Rico: the first, called Grito de Lares (Cry of Lares), was an uprising in the western municipality of Lares led by Francisco Ramírez Medina. The rebels captured Lares, but when attempting to capture the nearby town of San Sebastián, the rebel militia was annihilated by Spanish forces and many leaders were executed or exiled. Though the Grito de Lares was a failure, it inspired another uprising in the nearby town of Yauco in 1897 when two groups of Puerto Rican nationalists led by coffee plantation owner Antonio Mattei Lluberas attacked Spanish barracks in the town, but were ambushed by Spanish forces who were warned of an imminent attack. Although these two rebellions were not successful, they have much symbolic resonance with the Puerto Rican independence movement, and the Grito de Lares flag is regarded as a symbol of Puerto Rican nationalism. |
| Republic of Manitobah | 1867–1869 | ? | Canada | A provisional entity formed by the inhabitants of the town of Portage la Prairie in Rupert's Land. The town had reached the stage at which it needed a municipal corporation to tax and police the settlers. The settlers, led by Thomas Spence, formed the Republic of Manitobah, named after a local lake. The republic was dissolved a year later due to fur traders not paying taxes and the British administration denying legitimacy to the state. |
| Provisional Government of Assiniboia | 1869–1870 | ? | Canada | A Métis provisional government led by politician Louis Riel in the Red River Rebellion. Demanded self-government rather than direct rule by the Canadian government, following Canada's purchase of Rupert's Land from the Hudson's Bay Company. Negotiated entry into the Confederation of Canada as the province of Manitoba. |
| Provisional Government of Saskatchewan | 1885 | Batoche | Canada | A Métis secessionist state also led by Riel during the North-West Rebellion over land disputes with the Canadian government. The rebellion began with early successes at the Battle of Duck Lake and the Battle of Fish Creek, but a lack of local support and the size of the advancing Canadian force forced the rebels to make a last stand at the Battle of Batoche, and Riel was captured and executed. |
| Republic of Independent Guyana | 1886–1891 | Counani | Now part of Brazil | Established by French settlers in defiance of both France and Brazil. |
| Transatlantic Republic of Mato Grosso | 1892 | Corumba | Now part of Brazil | In the aftermath of the death of General Deodoro da Fonseca, many governors installed by Fonseca were removed from office, including the governor of Mato Grosso do Sul, Manuel Murtinho, who was removed by the 21st Infantry Battalion (under the command of Colonel João da Silva Barbosa) and local rebels. Barbosa intended to take advantage of the political turmoil and seize power for himself, and declared Mato Grosso do Sul a free republic. Soon the rebels were expelled from their capital of Corumba; the Transatlantic Republic was absorbed back into Brazil and Murtinho was reinstalled as governor. |
| Principality of Trinidad | 1893–1895 | Unknown | Now part of Brazil | Declared in 1893 when the American James Harden-Hickey claimed the uninhabited Trindade Island in the South Atlantic. He declared himself James I, Prince of Trinidad, and intended for the islands to become a military dictatorship under his leadership. |
| Greater Republic of Central America | 1895–1898 | Amapala | Central America | Another attempt at unifying Central America founded as the successor to the Greater Republic of Central America, formed by El Salvador, Honduras and Nicaragua, after the adoption of a new constitution. The new union did not last long because, in El Salvador, a successful coup led by General Tomás Regalado declared its departure from the federation, with Honduras and Nicaragua leaving a few days later. |
| Manhuassu Republic | 1896 | Manhuassu | Brazil | A microstate in the municipality of Manhuassu led by former mayor of the municipality Serafim Tibúrcio da Costa after he was fraudulently defeated in his re-election bid by Father Odorico Dolabela. Da Costa attempted to appeal to governor Chrispim Jacques Bias Fortes but was rejected, so took matters into his own hands. With a force of 800 men, he captured the area and declared it an independent republic. When the news reached the state administration they sent a force to recapture the municipality, who was beaten back by da Costa's forces. The administration had to appeal for reinforcements from the central government, which recaptured the town. |
| Federal State of Loreto | 1896 | Iquitos | Peru | An autonomous state of Peru proclaimed during the Loretan Insurrection of 1896 by insurgents wishing for a federalized Peruvian state. It was not supported by many of the inhabitants of the state and was soon put down by a Peruvian expedition. |
| Jungle Nation | 1899–1900 | Moyobamba | Peru | The second attempt to create an independent state in the Department of Loreto by Colonel Emilio Vizcarra, a Peruvian soldier appointed prefect of the department who grew disillusioned with the national government and declared himself 'Supreme Leader'. The republic came to an end with Vizcarra's death during his tour of the Loretan cities where, in Moyobamba, he was embroiled in a revolt and killed by a rock thrown at his head. |
| Republic of Acre | 1903 | Porto Acre | Brazil | Declared independence from Bolivia three times between 1899 and 1903 before being ceded to Brazil in the Treaty of Petrópolis. The region had been long settled by Brazilians for decades prior to its triple secession. |
| Republic of Arauca | 1916–1917 | Arauca | Colombia | A brief attempt at secession by the Arauca Department against the central government of Colombia. Created following Colombian fears of repeating a situation similar to the separation of Panama from the country. |
| Third Federal State of Loreto | 1921–1922 | Iquitos | Peru & Ecuador | Proclaimed during an insurrection in 1921 by Captain Guillermo Cervantes, it was declared as a call for greater autonomy for peripheral regions of Peru as well as a possible transformation of the country into a federal state. Succeeded previous secessions by Loreto in 1896 and 1899. |
| Federation of Central America | 1921–1922 | Tegucigalpa | Guatemala, El Salvador, and Honduras | The fifth attempt at a Central American union. Despite attempts at earning recognition from the United States under both Woodrow Wilson and Warren G. Harding, the eventual coup in Guatemala orchestrated by General José María Orellana led the US Department of State to predict the federation's coming collapse, which ultimately happened, and so the US did not formally recognize it. |
| Republic of Tule | 1925 | Ailigandí | Panama | A state established by the Guna people during the San Blas Rebellion against the Panamanian government, fought over the systematic cultural assimilation of the native Guna when Panama seceded from Colombia. The rebellion began when a conference was held on the island of Agligandi and declared independence; systematic attacks were carried out on police positions on many of the San Blas Islands. Soon negotiations meditated by the United States between the rebels and the Panamanian administration resulted in a peace treaty that allowed the Guna to retain their autonomous position as the Guna Yala Comarca. |
| Free Territory of Princesa | 1930 | Princesa Isabel | Brazil | A state with the goal of rejoining Brazil as its own state, also known as the Republic of Princesa. |
| Socialist Republic of Chile | 1932 | Santiago | Chile | Established by the Chilean Government Junta in the midst of the Great Depression following the resignation of President Carlos Ibáñez del Campo. Lasted for three months before being dissolved due to unpopular drastic economic measures enforced on the country. |
| State of Maracaju | 1932 | Campo Grande | Brazil | Created during the Constitutionalist Revolution, occupying what is today Rio Grande do Sul. An early manifestation of separatism by Cuiabá. |
| State of São Paulo | 1932 | São Paulo | Brazil | A rebellion against the presidency of Getúlio Vargas, who eroded the autonomy of the Brazilian states provided by the 1891 Constitution and established a virtual dictatorship through uncontrolled rule by decree. Paulistas were not seeking independence from Brazil, but rather reform of the central government in Rio de Janeiro. |
| Revolutionary Nationalist Movement government in Santa Cruz de la Sierra | 1949 | Santa Cruz de la Sierra | Brazil | Uprisings by Revolutionary Nationalist Movement militants in four cities lead to a parallel government being declared in Santa Cruz de la Sierra under the interim presidency of Edmundo Roca. Víctor Paz Estenssoro, exiled in Argentina, was declared president but the government in La Paz regained control on 12 September. |
| State Union of Jeová | 1952–1953 | Cotaxé | Brazil | From July 1952 to March 1953, a sect of Jehovah's Witnesses proclaimed a messianic utopian community in the wake of peasant unrest in Espírito Santo and Minas Gerais. As a consequence, it was not until 2015 that 40 km^{2} of Ecoporanga were disputed by both states. |
| Republic of Anguilla | 1967–1969 | The Valley | Anguilla | On 6 February 1969, Anguilla held a referendum resulting in a vote of 1,739 to 4 against returning to association with Saint Kitts. The next day, Anguilla declared itself an independent republic. |
| Provisional Government Committee of Rupununi | 1969 | Lethem | Guyana | Two years after the independence of Guyana from the United Kingdom, the country was shocked by an uprising of cattle ranchers and Rupununi Amerindians in its southwestern region of Upper Takutu-Upper Essequibo, with the insurgents being allegedly supported by Venezuela. Part of the ongoing territorial dispute between both countries. |
| (Argentina) Military Administration of the Malvinas, South Georgia and South Sandwich Islands | 1982 | Puerto Argentino | United Kingdom | Established during the Falklands War when Argentina briefly seized the Falkland Islands from the United Kingdom. Lasted for 74 days, with little persecution and mistreatment of the local Falkland Islanders. |
| Republic of Airrecú | 1993 | ? | Nicaragua | Relations between Costa Rica and Nicaragua have traditionally been strained. This situation was not improved when the Costa Rican government granted land rights to settlers along the San Juan River, which forms part of the border between Costa Rica and Nicaragua. A dispute ended with Costa Rica acknowledging that the territory in fact belonged to Nicaragua, and promised to remove the settlers. The settlers, however, refused to leave. In June 1993, they declared their independence as the Republic of Airrecú, which means "friendship" in a local Indian language. The Nicaraguan Army immediately descended upon the area and escorted the Republic into Costa Rica. |
| Popular Assembly of the Peoples of Oaxaca | 2006 | Oaxaca City | Mexico | The Mexican state of Oaxaca was embroiled in a conflict that lasted more than seven months and resulted in at least seventeen deaths and the occupation of the capital city of Oaxaca by the Popular Assembly of the Peoples of Oaxaca (APPO). |

== Asia ==
| Name | Date | Capital | Now part of | Description |
|---|---|---|---|---|
| Judean provisional government | 66–68 | Jerusalem | Israel; Palestine | A Jewish provisional government formed by Joseph ben Gurion and other Jewish rebels of the Pharisees and the Sadducees during the First Jewish–Roman War. The provisional government ceased to exist after the Zealot Coup where the Zealots, a radical Jewish sect, overthrew the administration, marking the downfall of the First Jewish–Roman War. |
| Yan | 237–238 | Xiangping | China | A small kingdom on the Liaodong Peninsula founded during the Three Kingdoms period. Yan was soon dissolved after Sima Yi's Liaodong campaign against it. |
| Palmyrene Empire | 270–273 | Palmyra | Syria, Turkey, Lebanon, Israel, Palestine, Jordan, Egypt | A breakaway state from the Roman Empire in Asia Minor, the Levant, and Egypt founded during the widespread instability during the Crisis of the Third Century. The empire first existed as a kingdom from 260 until Queen Zenobia claimed the imperial title in opposition to incumbent Roman Emperor Aurelian, who launched an offensive against the Palmyrenes. Aurelian captured the majority of Palmyrene territory and Zenobia. The Palmyrenes rebelled and the city of Palmyra was razed, marking the end of the empire. |
| Ran Wei | 350–352 | Ye | China | A dynastic state created by Ran Min when he usurped the Later Zhao. Ran Wei was soon absorbed by the Former Yan after the Battle of Liantai. |
| Zhai Wei | 388–392 | Huatai | China | A small Dingling dynastic state during the chaotic timespan of the Sixteen Kingdoms led by Zhai Liao and later his son Zhai Zhao. |
| Huan Chu | 404 | Jiankang | China | An area controlled by Jin warlord and general Huan Xuan when he briefly usurped Emperor An of Jin and declared himself Emperor of Huan Chu. At the start of his reign, Xuan ruled nearly unopposed; however, an uprising led by future Liu Song dynasty emperor Liu Yu forced Xuan to flee to his old power base in the east, where he was betrayed by his own subordinates and was beheaded. |
| Jie Yan | 911–914 | You Prefecture | China | A small kingdom centred around Beijing during the Five Dynasties and Ten Kingdoms era founded by warlord Liu Shouguang. The kingdom came to an end when Li Cunxu of the Former Jin invaded Beijing. |
| Great Yin | 943–945 | Jianning | China | During the Five Dynasties and Ten Kingdoms period, Wang Yanzheng, one of the sons of the late Min king Wang Shenzhi, carved out an area of the northwestern area of the Min kingdom and proclaimed himself king. Yanzheng's rival to the Min throne, his brother Wang Yanxi, was soon assassinated; Yanzheng stepped in to claim the throne and Yin was reabsorbed. |
| Later Han | 947–951 | Bian | China | A Shatuo-led dynastic state during the Five Dynasties and Ten Kingdoms period. The empire lasted until a rebellion overthrew the dynasty and established the Later Zhou. The remnants of the empire helped found the Northern Han. |
| Xingliao | 1029–1030 | Liaoyang | China | A state in Northern China founded by former Liao general Da Yanlin when he revolted against them. Yanlin allied with the Jurchens and Goryeo but was still defeated by a pincer attack from the Liao. |
| Northern Liao | 1122–1123 | Xijin Fu | China | During the fall of the Khitan Liao dynasty and the rise of the Jurchen Jin dynasty, the powerful Khitan Yelü clan fled to the far reaches of the empire, where they founded successor states to the Liao. One of the dynasties the Yelü established was in modern-day Inner Mongolia under the rule of Yelü Dashi. The state came to an abrupt end when Dashi was captured fighting the Jin, who then captured their capital of Xijin Fu. |
| Da Chu | 1127 | Jiankang | China | A puppet state of the Jin dynasty founded during the Jin–Song wars after the Jin captured the Northern Song capital of Jiankang. As the Jin did not have the resources to fully annex the region, they installed a client regime under Zhang Bangchang. Da Chu came to an end when the Southern Song forced Bangchang to submit to them and commit suicide, provoking the Jin into further conflict. |
| Later Liao | 1216–1219 | Chengzhou | China | The last attempt by the Yelü clan to establish a successor state to the Liao dynasty. Later Liao was formed when Eastern Liao was vassalized by the Mongol Empire and Yelü Sibu, the current emperor of Eastern Liao's brother, declared himself emperor of an independent dynasty. After a series of misfortunes and rulers, their last emperor, Yelü Hanshe, committed suicide and Later Liao was reabsorbed into Eastern Liao. |
| Zhou | 1354–1357 | Gaoyou; Suzhou (from 1356) | China | A small rebel state led by Zhang Shicheng during the Red Turban Rebellions. Shicheng, formerly a salt shipper from Jiangsu, was made leader of the rebellious salt traders and peasants and started to entrench his forces around the northern and eastern areas of Jiangsu. While the Yuan dynasty attempted to negotiate with the rebels, it ended with their envoys being executed. Zhou collapsed in 1357 due to multiple factors; various famines and plagues swept the northern territory of the kingdom, and with larger and with larger Yuan forces amassing on his border, Shicheng abdicated his title. |
| Chen Han | 1360–1364 | Jiujiang | China | During the Red Turban Rebellions the prime minister of the newly established state of Tianwan attempted to assassinate his emperor, Xu Shouhui, but was assassinated by a general by the name of Chen Youliang, who proclaimed himself King of Han and captured the Tianwan capital of Hanyang. However, Youliang made the mistake of invading the province of Jiangnan that was under the control of future Ming Emperor Zhu Yuanzhang, where he died and his empire collapsed. |
| Wu | 1363–1367 | Suzhou | China | A successor state to Zhou that was established after the defeat of Chen Youliang, the emperor of Chen Han, at the hands of Zhang Shicheng's mortal enemy Zhu Yuanzhang. After Youliang's defeat, Shicheng reestablished his presence in the Jiangsu area and held out against the Yuan. The state came to an end when Shicheng launched a strike against the Ming that went awry and ended with the capture of Suzhou and Zhang Shicheng's death. |
| Geum dynasty | 1453 | ? | Korea | A dynastic state proclaimed by Yi Chingok during his abortive rebellion against Joseon. |
| Great Xi | 1643–1647 | Huangzhou (1643); Chengdu (1644–1647) | China | A small empirical state during the Ming–Qing transition established by peasant rebel leader, Zhang Xianzhong, in the central province of Sichuan. After Xianzhong's death the empire was invaded by both the Southern Ming and the Qing dynasty. |
| Shun dynasty | 1644–1646 | Xi'an (1644); Beijing (1644) ? (1645–1646) | China | Another peasant revolt state during the Ming–Qing transition, this time in the north of the country around the city of Xi'an. At the peak of its power, the Shun dynasty controlled a large portion of northweastern China and captured Beijing. However, Shun forces under the command of their leader, Li Zicheng, were defeated at the Battle of Shanhai Pass by the newly emerging Qing dynasty and forced to retreat south towards the ever encroaching Southern Ming, where Shun dissolved due to heavy infighting. |
| Free Ilocos | 1762–1763 | Vigan | Philippines | A revolutionary state declared by Diego Silang in Northern Luzon during the British occupation of Manila. |
| Mu'ammarid Imamate | 1818–1820 | Diriyah | Saudi Arabia | An emirate based around the city of Diriyah after the fall of the First Saudi state. The Imamate was a vassal of Ottoman Egypt, especially its governor, Muhammad Ali. The emirate was reincorporated into the Second Saudi State in 1820. |
| Empire of the Philippine Islands | 1823 | Intramuros | Philippines | A polity proclaimed by Filipino captain Andrés Novales and his supporters during their revolt against the Spanish. Novales and his fellow officers rebelled due to their concerns about the treatment of Filipino troops in the Spanish Army. The revolt was put down by Spanish forces quickly, and Novales was executed by firing squad. |
| Karakalpak Khanate | 1855–1856 | ? | Uzbekistan | A rebellion against the Khanate of Khiva by Karakalpaks wishing to establish their own independent state, quickly quelled by the Khivans. |
| Republic of Ezo | 1869 | Hakodate | Japan | Also known as the Republic of Japan, the Republic of Ezo was a separatist state established in the northern Japanese island of Hokkaido. |
| Kingdom of Sedang | 1888–1889 | Kon Gung | Vietnam | A ephemeral state declared by French explorer Marie-Charles David de Mayréna after the governor of French Indochina sent him to negotiate treaties with the Kingdom of Siam after they started claiming parts of French Indochina, but instead allied with other tribes to declare the Kingdom of Sedang. The kingdom was dissolved shortly after when Marie was captured by the French Navy. |
| Republic of Formosa | 1895 | Taipei & Tainan | Taiwan | The inhabitants of the island of Taiwan declared themselves independent in response to the Qing Dynasty's move to secede the island to Japan. |
| Tejeros Revolutionary Government | 1897 | General Trias | Philippines | Following the Imus Assembly, several factions of the Katipunan, namely Magdiwang and Magdalo, cooperated to establish a provisional government and conduct the first democratic election in Philippine history as a step to ultimately establish an independent Philippine state. |
| Republic of Biak-na-Bato | 1897 | San Miguel | Philippines | A Filipino revolutionary government declared by soldier Emilio Aguinaldo during the Philippine Revolution. |
| Dictatorial Government of the Philippines | 1898 | Bacoor | Philippines | A Filipino insurgent government in Bacoor during the Spanish–American War. |
| Revolutionary Government of the Philippines | 1898 | Bacoor & Malolos | Philippines | A revolutionary government set up by Emilio Aguinaldo during the Spanish–American War. |
| Republic of Negros | 1898–1899 | Bacolod | Philippines | A revolutionary state on the island of Negros, it later became the Federal State of the Visayas shortly after the 1898 cession of the Philippines to the U.S. by Spain. |
| Republic of Zamboanga | 1899–1903 | Zamboanga | Philippines | A Zamboangueño breakaway state. |
| Tianjin Provisional Government | 1900–1902 | Tianjin | China | Formed by the Eight-Nation Alliance during the Boxer Rebellion in China, which controlled the major city Tianjin and its surrounding areas from 1900 to 1902. |
| Heavenly Kingdom of the Great Mingshun | 1903 | Guangzhou | China | An attempt at establishing a Westernised monarchy in China by the Revive China Society. |
| Great Han Sichuan Military Government | 1911–1912 | Chengdu | China | A military administration of the province of Sichuan during the 1911 Revolution against the Qing dynasty founded as the tide of revolution swept across China, with many other provinces seceding from Qing. The Government was left in turmoil by a soldiers' mutiny in the city of Chengdu, and merged with another regional government, the Shu Military Government, to form the Sichuan Military Government. Ultimately, the entire region was absorbed as a province of the newly formed Republic of China (1912–1949). |
| Uryankhay Republic | 1911–1914 | ? | Russia and Mongolia | A nominally independent state that broke away from the Qing dynasty of China during the Xinhai Revolution. It was proclaimed as a republic in 1911 by the Tuvan separatist movement and was encouraged by the Russian Empire. |
| Provisional Government of the Republic of China | 1912–1913 | Nanjing (1912), Beijing (1912–1913) | China | A revolutionary government established after the 1911 Revolution and fully organized after the Wuchang Uprising. The government was led by Sun Yat-sen, the founding father of the Republic of China. The government came to its end after the formation of the Beiyang government with some Qing elements. |
| Empire of China | 1915–1916 | Peking | China | An attempt to reinstate monarchy in China by Yuan Shikai. |
| Erzincan Soviet | 1916–1921 | Erzincan (until 1918) Yeşilyazı (1918–1921) | Turkey | A soviet in the town of Erzincan, when it and its neighbour, the municipality of Tunceli, were under Russian occupation. The soviet was dissolved when a force of Kuva-yi Milliye defeated the Red Guards supporting it. |
| Restored Qing Imperial Government | 1917 | Beijing | China | An attempt at restoring the Qing Dynasty under Emperor Puyi, which was overthrown in 1912, by warlord and Qing loyalist Zhang Xun during the Manchu Restoration. The putsch lasted only 12 days until it was put down by the Republicans. |
| Harbin Soviet of Workers and Soldiers Deputies | 1917 | Harbin | China | A soviet of Russian workers and soldiers in Harbin at the time of the 1917 Russian Revolution. The Harbin Soviet was founded immediately after Czar Nicholas II's abdication, and sought to seize control over the Chinese Eastern Railway and to defend Russian citizens in Manchuria. |
| State of Buryat-Mongolia | 1917–1920 | Chita | Russia | A buffer state during the Russian Civil War. |
| Alash Autonomy | 1917–1920 | Alash-Qala (Semey) | Kazakhstan, Russia | Proclaimed during the Second All-Kazakh Congress, held at Orenburg from 5 to 13 December 1917 OS (18 to 26 December 1917 NS), with a provisional government being established under Alikhan Bukeikhanov. |
| Iğdır National Republic | 1917–1920 | Melekli | Turkey | Established as a continuation of the Iğdır Executive Government, which was formed upon the proposal of the Armenians living in the region following the power vacuum created in Iğdır and its surroundings after the Soviet Revolution of October 1917. |
| Gray Ukraine | 1917–1921 | Omsk | Kazakhstan, Russia | An attempt by ethnic Ukrainians living in southern Siberia and northern Kazakhstan at establishing autonomy for Grey Ukraine, where they settled between the mid-18th and early 20th centuries. |
| State of Buryat-Mongolia | 1917–1921 | Chita | Russia | A buffer Buryat-Mongolian state during the Russian Civil War. The main government body was Burnatskom, the Buryat National Committee. The state de facto ceased to exist after the formation of the Far Eastern Republic, which divided Buryat-Mongolia in two: 4 aimags became part of the Far Eastern Republic, while the other 4 formed Buryat-Mongol autonomous regions of the Russian Soviet Federative Socialist Republic (RSFSR). |
| Constitutional Protection Junta | 1917–1921 | Guangzhou | China | A military government established by the Kuomintang in Guangzhou in opposition to the Beiyang government on 1 September 1917, after the beginning of the Constitutional Protection Movement on 17 July 1917. |
| Green Ukraine | 1917–1922 | ? | Russia | After the establishment of the Bolshevik Far Eastern Republic on April 6, 1920, Far Eastern areas with an ethnic Ukrainian majority attempted to secede and establish an entity called Green Ukraine. This movement quickly proved abortive. |
| Yakutia | 1918 | Yakutsk | Russia | An uprising by Yakuts in support of the anti-Bolshevik White Army. |
| Provisional Siberian Government | 1918 | Omsk | Russia | A government in Siberia created by the White movement in 1918. |
| Provisional Government of Autonomous Siberia | 1918 | Vladivostok | Russia | Another government in Siberia created by the White movement in 1918. |
| Siberian Republic | 1918 | Omsk | Russia | An attempt at Siberian regionalism. |
| Provisional Regional Government of the Urals | 1918 | Yekaterinburg | Russia | An anti-Bolshevik government set up in Yekaterinburg. |
| Committee of Members of the Constituent Assembly | 1918 | Samara | Russia | An anti-Bolshevik socialist government in Samara after the Revolt of the Czechoslovak Legion in 1918. The Assembly soon started to lose battles and finally dissolved after the Kolchak Coup. |
| Kurdish State | 1918–1919 | Sulaymaniyah | Iraq | A Kurdish polity that existed in Iraqi Kurdistan under British suzerainty, founded by Mahmud Barzanji and other Kurdish nationalists during the Dissolution of the Ottoman Empire. Barzanji and the others hoped to gain Kurdish independence by allying with the British. Although the relationship between the two was cordial at the start, connections started to fray and culminated in Barzanji reforming the State into a Kingdom with himself as monarch. |
| Constitution Protection Region of Southern Fujian | 1918–1920 | Longxi | China | An anarchist military government. |
| Russian State | 1918–1920 | Ufa, Omsk | Russia, Kazakhstan, Turkmenistan, Uzbekistan | A White Army anti-Bolshevik state proclaimed by the Act of the Ufa State Conference of September 23, 1918 (the Constitution of the Provisional All-Russian Government), “On the formation of the all-Russian supreme power” in the name of “restoring state unity and independence of Russia” affected by the revolutionary events of 1917, the October Revolution and the signing of the treaty of Brest-Litovsk with Germany. |
| Transbaikal Cossack Republic | 1918–1920 | Chita | Russia | A provisional government established by Cossacks in Chita, Zabaykalsky Krai. |
| Confederated Republic of Altai | 1918–1922 | Ulala | Russia | An attempt at establishing an independent Altai during the Russian Civil War. The long-term aim of the state was to merge with neighboring Tuva and Khakassia in order to restore the 17th-century Dzungar Khanate, but Turkic-led. |
| Ferghana Provisional Government | 1919–1920 | Osh | Kyrgyzstan | A polity of the Basmachi movement led by Madame Bey. |
| Arab Kingdom of Syria | 1919–1920 | Damascus | Syria | A constitutional monarchy led by Faisal I of Iraq. |
| Oltu Council Government | 1919–1920 | Oltu | Turkey | Established by local Turks and Greeks in response to the British occupation of Kars. |
| Zone of Smyrna | 1919–1922 | Smyrna | Turkey | A Greek occupation of the city of Smyrna and the surrounding areas. The Occupation began with the Greek landing at Smyrna as authorised by the Allied Powers during the Partition of the Ottoman Empire. The Zone ended with the capture of the city by Turkish forces during the Greco-Turkish War. |
| Provisional Government of the Far East | 1920 | Vladivostok | Russia | An Anti-White movement state established around Vladivostok, which was later incorporated into the pro-Bolsheviks Far Eastern Republic and the pro-White Provisional Priamurye Government. |
| South Russian Government | 1920 | Novorossiysk | Russia | The Successor of Anton Denikin's General Command of the Armed Forces of South Russia. |
| Government of South Russia | 1920 | Sevastopol | Russia | A White movement government established as the successor of Anton Denikin's South Russian Government by Pyotr Wrangel in Crimea. |
| Eastern Okraina | 1920 | Chita | Russia | A local government created after the defeat of White forces in Western Siberia. The leader of the forces, Alexander Kolchak, ordered Grigory Mikhaylovich Semyonov to evacuate their forces to the territory of Russia's eastern outskirts. |
| Azadistan | 1920 | Tabriz | Iran | A state in Iranian Azerbaijan established by Mohammad Khiabani. |
| Persian Socialist Soviet Republic | 1920–1921 | Rasht | Iran | A soviet republic declared by revolutionary leader Mirza Kuchik Khan and the Jungle Movement of Gilan. |
| Independent State of Raqqa | 1920–1921 | Raqqa | Syria | Created by rebels against the French occupation of Syria. |
| Republic of China Military Government | 1920–1921 | Guangzhou | China | A military government centred around the Second Constitutional Protection Movement. |
| Far Eastern Soviet Republic | 1920–1922 | Verkhneudinsk, Chita | Russia | A nominally independent state that existed from April 1920 to November 1922 in the easternmost part of the Russian Far East. Although nominally independent, it largely came under the control of the RSFSR, which envisaged it as a buffer state between the RSFSR and the territories occupied by Japan during the Russian Civil War of 1917–1922. |
| Khorezm People's Soviet Republic | 1920–1924 | Khiva | Uzbekistan, Turkmenistan and Kazakhstan | Succeeded the Khanate of Khiva. |
| Bukharan People's Soviet Republic | 1920–1924 | Bukhara | Uzbekistan, Turkmenistan and Tajikistan | Succeeded the Emirate of Bukhara. |
| Autonomous Government of Khorasan | 1921 | Rasht | Iran | A military state established by warlord Mohammad Taqi Pessian. |
| Government of the Republic of China in Guangzhou | 1921–1922 | Guangzhou | China | The leadership of the Second Constitutional Protection Movement led by Sun Yat-sen that succeeded the Constitutional Protection Junta. The Government came to its demise after the establishment of the Army and Navy Marshal stronghold of the Republic of China. |
| Provisional Priamurye Government | 1921–1923 | Vladivostok | Russia | An administration of the Priamurye region in the Russian Far East. It was one of the last vestiges of the Russian State lasting until June 1923. The Government was a de facto Japanese protectorate and crumbled rapidly when Japanese forces withdrew from the area. |
| Provisional Yakut Regional People's Government | 1921–1923 | Churapcha | Russia | The last front of the Russian Civil War, in the Pacific Coast of the Russian Far East where Mikhail Korobeinikov established the last White government of the civil war. Over the course of the next three years, the territory slowly decreased until the Red Army captured the port of Ayan. |
| Mountain Autonomous Soviet Socialist Republic | 1921–1924 | Vladikavkaz | Russia | An Autonomous Soviet Socialist Republic of the Russian SFSR formed out of the remains of the Mountain Republic after it was conquered by the Red Army. The Republic did not last very long; the Kabardin Autonomous Oblast was cut from it, followed by the Karachay-Cherkess Autonomous Oblast and others until it was finally partitioned into the North Ossetian and Ingush Autonomous Oblasts. |
| Kingdom of Kurdistan | 1921–1924 | Sulaymaniyah | Iraq | Established by Kurdish nationalists following the collapse of Ottoman Turkey, but was defeated by Britain and incorporated into the British Mandate of Mesopotamia. |
| Korean Unification Government | 1922–1924 | Huanren and Gwanjeon | China | An autonomous prefecture that acted as an umbrella movement for various Korean independence movements in Manchuria, specifically the western Jiandao region. The Government was rife with internal disputes and in 1924 splintered into three: the Righteous Army Command, the General Staff Headquarters, and the Righteous Government. |
| Syrian Federation | 1922–1925 | Aleppo (1922–1923); Damascus (1923–1925) | Syria; Turkey; Israel | A Federation of the State of Aleppo, the State of Damascus, and the Alawite State under the French Mandate of Syria. The Federation was dissolved after the merger of Damascus and Aleppo to form the State of Syria. |
| Army and Navy Marshal stronghold of the Republic of China | 1923–1925 | Guangzhou | China | A military administration that ran Guangzhou and other parts of Southern China after the defeat of the Second Constitutional Protection Movement, where the leaders of the movement fled to the city with the remnants of their forces. It was succeeded by the Nationalist government. |
| Sharifian Caliphate | 1924–1925 | Mecca | Saudi Arabia | A caliphate declared by the Hejaz as the successor of the Ottoman Caliphate. |
| Tungus Republic | 1924–1925 | Ayan | Russia | In the aftermath of the Russian Civil War, the Soviet OGPU secret police and local branches of the new communist regime pursued a policy of terror against the native Tungusic peoples, imposing "taxes" on many items including feathers, weapons, firewood, dogs, and peeled tree bark. In May 1924, rebels led by Mikhail Artemyev captured the town of Nelkan, and in July, the independence of the Tungus Republic was declared in Ayan. After successful negotiations between the separatists and the Yakut ASSR, the rebels surrendered and were given amnesty. |
| Righteous Government | 1924–1929 | Liuhe County | China | An autonomous prefecture in Manchuria formed by Korean refugees fleeing Japanese persecution in their homeland. The Government merged with two other Korean autonomous prefectures, the General Staff Headquarters and the Korean People's Association in Manchuria, to form the National People's Government. |
| State of Syria | 1925–1930 | Damascus | Syria; Turkey; Israel | A successor state to the Syrian Federation formed by the merger of the State of Aleppo and the State of Damascus. The State was racked by troubles during its short existence, namely the Great Syrian Revolt. Though the revolt was ultimately defeated by the French, it led to the proclamation of the First Syrian Republic, which absorbed the State. |
| Wuhan Nationalist Government | 1926–1927 | Wuhan | China | A left-wing Kuomintang government of the recently conquered city of Wuhan led by Wang Jingwei, an eventual Japanese collaborator. After the Shanghai Massacre, the Government split from the Nationalist regime. However, tensions between the Wuhan government and the CCP resulted in the July 15 Incident, where the administration in Wuhan reconciled and peacefully merged with the Nationalists. |
| Provisional Municipal Government of the Special City of Shanghai | 1927 | Shanghai | China | A Communist government of the city of Shanghai founded during the Northern Expedition, where the Kuomintang and the Communist Party marched on Beijing. The city of Shanghai was viewed by the Communists as the perfect starting point for a workers' revolution due to its large labour industry; they overthrew the city's administration and declared a revolutionary commune. This move was viewed by the Kuomintang as a betrayal, and their leader Chiang Kai-shek ordered the dissolution of the commune, which resulted in the Shanghai massacre and the beginning of the Chinese Civil War. |
| Hailufeng Soviet | 1927 | Shanwei? | China | The first Chinese soviet, established in November 1927 by Peng Pai with Ye Ting's remnant troops from the Nanchang Uprising. After the Little Long March and the near-rout at the Battle of Shantou, its troops were much diminished and were directed by Comintern to lie low in the deep countryside and avoid any further battles. |
| Guangzhou Commune | 1927 | Guangzhou | China | A political structure established in Guangzhou during the Guangzhou Uprising, also called the Soviet of Workers, Soldiers and Peasant Deputies. |
| Hunan Soviet | 1927 | ? | China | A Communist Chinese insurrection led by Mao Zedong and Li Zhen in the Hunan and Jiangxi areas. |
| Republic of Ararat | 1927–1931 | Doğubayazıt | Turkey | The Republic of Ararat, led by the central committee of the Xoybûn party, declared independence on 28 October 1927 or 1928 during a wave of rebellion among Kurds in southeastern Turkey. Ihsan Nuri was appointed military leader and Ibrahim Heski was put in charge of the civilian government. |
| Emirate of Afghanistan | 1929 | Kabul | Afghanistan | An unrecognised state declared by Saqqawists on the territory that they held during the Afghan Civil War. |
| Republic of Solon | 1929–1930 | Hailar | China, Mongolia | An ethnic Mongol state in Manchuria backed by the Soviet Union during their conflict with the Republic of China over the Chinese Eastern Railway. The Republic was led by Mongol nationalists residing in the Mongolian People's Republic who formed a temporary administration of areas of land occupied by the Red Army. The Republic was dissolved after the Soviets withdrew from the area after reaching an agreement with the Chinese. |
| Korean People's Association in Manchuria | 1929–1931 | Hailin | China | A self-governing autonomous prefecture in Manchuria populated by two million Korean refugees. Following the Japanese occupation of Korea, many Korean anarchists had fled over the border into Manchuria, where they began organising a network of mutual aid for displaced Koreans in the region. Together with some Korean nationalists, they established the KPAM in order to provide food, education and self-defence to its members. Before long, the association found itself under attack by both Korean communists and Japanese imperialists, who assassinated their leadership. The Japanese invasion of Manchuria put an end to the anarchist experiment, with many of its members fleeing to China to fight against the Japanese Empire. |
| Nghệ-Tĩnh Soviet | 1930–1931 | ? | Vietnam | A series of uprisings against French Indochina in the Nghệ An and Hà Tĩnh Provinces. |
| Kumul Khanate | 1931–1934 | Kumul | China | A rebellion led by Uyghur chieftain and Kuomintang general Yulbars Khan to restore the Kumul Khanate and the heir to the throne, Nasir. |
| Northeast Supreme Administrative Council | 1932 | Changchun | China | The forerunner of Japanese puppet state Manchukuo. |
| First East Turkestan Republic | 1933–1934 | Kashgar | China | An unrecognized breakaway Islamic Uyghur state in northwestern China. |
| People's Revolutionary Government of the Republic of China | 1933–1934 | Fuzhou | China | Also known as the Fujian People's Government, it was an anti-Kuomintang socialist state established in the Fujian Province. |
| Northwest Chinese Soviet Federation | 1935–1936 | Mao County, Barkam, Jinchuan County & Garzê County | China | A confederation of two ethnic minority governments, the Tibetan People's Republic and Revolutionary Government of the Republic of Geledesha. |
| East Hebei Autonomous Government | 1935–1938 | Tongzhou (1935–1937); Tangshan (1937–1938) | China | An autonomous buffer state led by Yin Ju-keng, the Chinese administrator of parts of the Hebei province, after the signing of the Tanggu Truce between the Japanese Empire and the Republic of China that established a demilitarized zone between the forces where neither of them could hold influence. In said demilitarized zone where Ju-keng held power, he declared an autonomous state and began signing economic agreements with the Japanese due to it being inline with the Japanese North China Buffer State Strategy. The government was plagued by troubles including a Yellow Sand Society uprising and the Tongzhou mutiny and merged into the newly established Provisional Government of the Republic of China. |
| Tibetan People's Republic | 1936 | Derge | China | The ethnically Tibetan half of the Northwest Chinese Soviet Federation. |
| Great Way Government | 1937–1938 | Pudong | China | This polity, also called the Dadao Government, was a puppet government established by the Japanese Empire to govern Japanese-occupied Shanghai in the early stages of the Second Sino-Japanese War. |
| North Shanxi Autonomous Government | 1937–1939 | Datong | China | An autonomous area of the Japanese client state Mengjiang. Soon after the Government's establishment, the Mengjiang administration began to exercise more and more influence over it, which culminated in its absorption into the United Mongol Autonomous Government. |
| Mongol United Autonomous Government | 1937–1939 | Hohhot | China | An autonomous administration of Inner Mongolia established by the Japanese after the start of the Second Sino-Japanese War. The Autonomous Government was controlled by Inner Mongolian Nobles and subjugated to another Japanese puppet state, Mengjiang. The Government was fully dissolved into Mengjiang in 1929. |
| South Chahar Autonomous Government | 1937–1939 | Kalgan | China | Another regional puppet state of Japan established after the Second Sino-Japanese War. The Government was one of the three components of the Mengjiang state, meant to represent ethnic Mongolians. The Autonomous Government was merged with the other two components of Mengjiang, due to infighting between the three, to form the united Mengjiang United Autonomous Government. |
| Provisional Government of the Republic of China | 1937–1940 | Beijing | China | A military regime established by the Japanese commanders of North China after they conquered Beijing during the Second Sino-Japanese War. The provisional government had little to no autonomy and in 1940 merged with other military regimes to form the Reorganized National Government of the Republic of China. |
| Hatay State | 1938–1939 | Antakya | Turkey | A transitional government located in the territory of the Sanjak of Alexandretta before becoming the Hatay Province of Turkey. |
| Reformed Government of the Republic of China | 1938–1940 | Nanjing | China | A Japanese military administration posing as a provisional government established around the cities of Nanjing and Shanghai after the Rape of Nanjing and the wider Japanese invasion of China. It was merged into Wang Jingwei's Reorganized National Government of the Republic of China in 1940. |
| Reorganized National Government of the Republic of China | 1940–1945 | Nanjing | China | A Japanese puppet regime headed by Wang Jingwei, a former Kuomintang official who had disagreed with Chiang Kai-Shek on how to combat the Japanese. The National Government "ruled" the areas seized by the Japanese during the Second Sino-Japanese War and was a merger of many other Japanese puppet states like the Reformed Government of the Republic of China and Mengjiang. After the Surrender of Japan in 1945, the Republic was dissolved and many of its leaders were executed for treason. |
| Free Republic of Nias | 1942 | Gunungsitoli | Indonesia | A state established through a coup by escaped Nazi prisoners. After the Dutch ship transporting them was bombed by the Japanese, the group planned a coup in the city of Gunungsitoli. |
| Second Philippine Republic | 1943–1945 | Manila & Baguio | Philippines | The Second Philippine Republic (officially known as the Republic of the Philippines, or known in the Philippines as the Japanese-sponsored Philippine Republic), was a puppet state established on October 14, 1943 during Japanese occupation. |
| State of Burma | 1943–1945 | Yangon | Myanmar | A Japanese puppet state led by the Burma Independence Army. |
| Provisional Government of Free India | 1943–1945 | Port Blair | India | A Japanese puppet state. Had diplomatic relationships with 11 countries, including Germany, Italy, Japan, the Philippines, and the Soviet Union. |
| Second East Turkestan Republic | 1944–1946 | Ghulja | China | A breakaway Islamic state that existed from 1944 to 1946, encompassing the three northernmost districts of Xinjiang Province, Republic of China: Ili, Tarbagatay and Altay. |
| Inner Mongolian People's Republic | 1945 | Sonid Right Banner | China | After the dissolution of the Japanese puppet state Mengjiang, a congress of "People's Representatives" was held and the socialist Inner Mongolian People's Republic was declared; it was later dissolved by China fearing separatism. |
| Kingdom of Luang Phrabang | 1945 | Luang Prabang | Laos | A Japanese puppet state led by Prince Phetsarath Ratanavongsa. |
| Kingdom of Kampuchea | 1945 | Phnom Penh | Cambodia | A Japanese puppet state. |
| Empire of Vietnam | 1945 | Huế | Vietnam | A puppet state of Japan in the French protectorates of Annam and Tonkin. |
| Hòn Gai-Cẩm Phả Commune | 1945 | Hòn Gai and Cẩm Phả | Vietnam | An anti-Japanese and anti-French Trotskyist state established in the Hòn Gai-Cẩm Phả coal region north of Haiphong. |
| Saigon Commune | 1945 | Saigon | Vietnam | An anti-Japanese and anti-French Trotskyist state established in Saigon, the capital of South Vietnam. |
| (Laos) Lao Issara | 1945–1946 | Vientiane & Luang Prabang | Laos | An anti-French state established in the aftermath of World War Two. |
| Azerbaijan People's Government | 1945–1946 | Tabriz | Iran | A Soviet satellite state in the Iranian Azerbaijan area. |
| People's Republic of Korea | 1945–1946 | Seoul | South Korea & North Korea | A provisional government established after the withdrawal of the Japanese in Korea, later occupied by the Soviet Union in the north and the United States in the south. |
| East Mongolia People's Autonomous Government | 1946 | Ulanhot | China | An autonomous administration that existed in the East of Inner Mongolia after the defeat of the Japanese in the Soviet–Japanese War, when Inner Mongolian Separatists proclaimed a Socialist revolutionary government. Under increasing Chinese Communist pressure, the Government merged with the Inner Mongolian People's Republic to create the Inner Mongolia Federation of Autonomy Movements. |
| Republic of Mahabad | 1946–1947 | Mahabad | Iran | A Kurdish Soviet satellite state established alongside the Azerbaijan People's Government. |
| Provisional People's Committee for North Korea | 1946–1947 | Pyongyang | North Korea | A provisional government established as the successor of the Soviet Civil Administration. |
| Montgard Country | 1946–1950 | Da Lat (1946–1948); Buôn Ma Thuột (1948–1950) | Vietnam | An autonomous area of French Indochina and its immediate successors, aimed at consolidating French control on the recently reconquered area by giving a degree of autonomy to the local Montagnard people. The Country was absorbed into the Domain of the Crown, a group of protectorates where Bảo Đại still ruled as Emperor, in 1950. |
| Khanate of Kalat | 1947–1948 | Kalat | Pakistan | A princely state that was briefly independent before ruler Ahmad of Kalat submitted to Pakistan. |
| Hyderabad State | 1947–1948 | Hyderabad | India | During the partition of British India, all princely states were given the option to join India, join Pakistan, or have independence. The Muslim Nizams who ruled the predominantly Hindu state chose independence. The Indians later invaded and annexed Hyderabad during Operation Polo. |
| Junagadh State | 1947–1948 | Junagadh | India | During the partition of British India all princely states were given the option to join India, join Pakistan, or have independence. Nawab Muhammad Mahabat Khan III chose for Junagadh to become part of Pakistan until its Indian invasion and annexation later that year. |
| Bantva Manavadar | 1947–1948 | Junagadh | India | A vassal of Junagadh. |
| People's Committee of North Korea | 1947–1948 | Pyongyang | North Korea | A pro-Soviet provisional government that oversaw the transition from Soviet occupation in northern Korea to the Democratic People's Republic of Korea. |
| Manipur State | 1947–1949 | Imphal | India and Myanmar | A former princely state of the British Indian Empire from 1891, Manipur became de jure independent on 14 August 1947 before acceding to India on 15 October 1949. After intense diplomatic pressure, King Bodhchandra Singh relented and acceded Manipur to India following the Manipur Merger Agreement. |
| Dominion of India | 1947–1950 | New Delhi | India; Bangladesh | A Dominion under the Crown encompassing all of India formed after Indian independence. In 1950, the Dominion transformed into a Republic within the Commonwealth of Nations. |
| Mường Autonomous Territory | 1947–1952 | Hòa Bình | Vietnam | An autonomous region for the Muong people created by the French to win their favour in the First Indochina War against Viet Minh. Though with some early successes, the Autonomous Territory was conquered by Viet Minh and was replaced by the Hòa Bình province. |
| Government of the National Front of Madiun | 1948 | Madiun | Indonesia | A failed attempt at a communist uprising. |
| Provisional Central Government of Vietnam | 1948–1949 | Ho Chi Minh City | Vietnam | A French-associated transitional government established in the protectorates of Tonkin and Annam until Cochinchina reunited and founded the State of Vietnam. |
| Pasundan Republic | 1948–1950 | Bandung | Indonesia | A Dutch puppet state established to destabilize the rebel Republic of Indonesia. It became a constituent state of the United States of Indonesia in 1949 and soon merged into the Republic of Indonesia. |
| United States of Indonesia | 1949–1950 | Jakarta | Indonesia | A federal state established after Indonesia's independence from the Netherlands, succeeded by the unitary Republic of Indonesia. |
| Republic of South Maluku | 1950–1963 | Ambon | Indonesia | The Moluccas formed part of the United States of Indonesia (27 December 1949 – 17 August 1950), but declared independence in April 1950 in reaction to centralizing tendencies from Jakarta. It was quickly conquered by Indonesian troops, but maintains a government in exile in the Netherlands. |
| Arab Federation | 1958 | Baghdad | Iraq & Jordan | A confederation between the Hashemite Kingdom of Iraq and Kingdom of Jordan. |
| United Arab States | 1958–1961 | Cairo and Sana'a | Egypt; Syria; Yemen | A confederation between the Kingdom of Yemen and the United Arab Republic to help further the ideology of Pan-Arabism. The Confederation failed to attract more members and was ultimately dissolved in 1961. |
| Revolutionary Government of the Republic of Indonesia | 1958–1961 | Padang | Indonesia | A revolutionary government set up in Sumatra to oppose the central government of Indonesia in 1958. Although frequently referred to as the PRRI/Permesta rebellion, the Permesta rebels were a separate movement in Sulawesi that had pledged allegiance with the PRRI on 17 February 1958. |
| United Suvadive Republic | 1959–1963 | Hithadhoo | Maldives | An attempted breakaway state; it was supported by Britain briefly before being abandoned. |
| (South Korea) Second Republic of Korea | 1960–1961 | Seoul | South Korea | Founded during the April Revolution against President Syngman Rhee. |
| Shanghai People's Commune | 1967 | Shanghai | China | A Maoist commune established during the January Storm by future Vice Premier of the People's Republic of China, Zhang Chunqiao. |
| Federation of Arab Emirates | 1968 | Al Karama | UAE; Bahrain; Qatar | A federal union composed of Bahrain, Qatar and the seven emirates of the UAE after the British withdrawal. The Federation ended due to disagreements that led to Qatar and Bahrain leaving the union and the establishment of the United Arab Emirates. |
| Khmer Republic | 1970–1975 | Phnom Penh | Cambodia | A United States-backed military dictatorship founded after the deposition of reigning King Norodom Sihanouk in the 1970 Cambodian coup d'état orchestrated by General Lon Nol, creating a de jure republic. This coup was due to Sihanouk's neutrality in the Vietnam War and closeness with China, both of which provoked the Americans into supporting the coup and installing a right-wing militaristic regime. The deposition of Sihanouk resulted in his supporters raising the banner of rebellion and allying with the communist Viet Minh-backed Khmer Rouge to form the National United Front of Kampuchea. This resulted in a long civil war until 1975, when the Khmer Republic finally capitulated. |
| Emirate of Abu Dhabi | 1971 | Abu Dhabi | UAE | After the independence of the Trucial States, the seven United Arab Emirates was formed. Joined December 3, 1971. |
| Emirate of Ajman | 1971 | Ajman | UAE | After the independence of the Trucial States, the seven United Arab Emirates was formed. Joined December 2, 1971. |
| Emirate of Dubai | 1971 | Dubai | UAE | After the independence of the Trucial States, the seven United Arab Emirates was formed. Joined December 2, 1971. |
| Emirate of Fujairah | 1971 | Fujairah | UAE | After the independence of the Trucial States, the seven United Arab Emirates was formed. Joined December 2, 1971. |
| Emirate of Sharjah | 1971 | Sharjah | UAE | After the independence of the Trucial States, the seven United Arab Emirates was formed. Joined December 2, 1971. |
| Emirate of Umm Al Quwain | 1971 | Umm Al Quwain | UAE | After the independence of the Trucial States, the seven United Arab Emirates was formed. Joined December 2, 1971. |
| Emirate of Ras Al Khaimah | 1971–1972 | Ras Al Khaimah | UAE | After the independence of the Trucial States, the seven United Arab Emirates was formed. Joined February 10, 1972. |
| (Palestine) People's Republic of Tyre | 1975–1976 | Tyre | Lebanon | A PLO-controlled enclave during the Lebanese Civil War after the takeover of the city of Tyre. |
| Republic of South Vietnam | 1975–1976 | Tây Ninh (1969–1972); Lộc Ninh (1972–1973); Cam Lộ (1973–1975); Saigon – Gia Dinh (1975–1976) | Vietnam | A puppet state of North Vietnam formed from the Provisional Revolutionary Government of the Republic of South Vietnam shadow government. |
| Provisional Government of East Timor | 1975–1976 | Dili | East Timor | An Indonesian puppet provisional government formed following the Indonesian invasion of East Timor in December 1975 and disbanded after annexation by Indonesia in July 1976 to become the Timor Timur province. |
| (People's Republic of Kampuchea) Liberated Area of Cambodia | 1978–1979 | Snuol district | Cambodia | Territory in Cambodia controlled by the Kampuchean United Front for National Salvation. In 1979, the Vietnamese took over Phnom Penh; the next day, the Kampuchean People's Revolutionary Council Government was established to replace the Liberated Area of Cambodia. |
| State of Free Lebanon | 1979–1984 | Marjayoun | Lebanon | An Israeli-backed state declared by Saad Haddad in south Lebanon during the Lebanese Civil War. |
| Islamic Revolutionary State of Afghanistan | 1980 | ? | Afghanistan | A small Salafist state located in the northern Bashgal Valley founded by cleric Mawlawi Afzal during the mujahideen insurgency. |
| (Kingdom of Laos) Royal Lao Democratic Government | 1982 | ? | Laos | In 1982, the United Lao National Liberation Front succeeded in briefly establishing the Royal Lao Democratic Government (proclaimed in exile in Bangkok on 18 August 1982 earlier that year) in a collection of southern Lao provinces largely due to support and aid from the People's Republic of China, which despite also being a communist state, maintained rather hostile relations with Laos. |
| Federal Republic of Mindanao | 1986 | Cagayan de Oro | Philippines | A breakaway state declared by former Mayor of Cagayan de Oro and leader of the Mindanao People's Democratic Movement Reuben Canoy. |
| Republic of Kuwait | 1990 | Kuwait City | Kuwait | A self-styled Iraqi puppet government established in the aftermath of the Invasion of Kuwait by Ba'athist Iraq; later annexed to become the Iraqi governate of Kuwait and the military occupied Saddamiyat al-Mitla' District. |
| Second Federal Republic of Mindanao | 1990 | Cagayan de Oro | Philippines | A revolt led by dissident Philippine Army colonel Alexander Noble and his supporters, seizing two garrisons in Cagayan de Oro and Butuan as an attempted coup against president Corazon Aquino. |
| Islamic Emirate of Kunar | 1991 | Asadabad | Afghanistan | A Salafist quasi-state in the Kunar Province led by Jamil al-Rahman and his group Jamaat al-Dawah ila al-Quran wal-Sunnah. |
| Gorno-Badakhshan Republic | 1992 | Khorugh | Tajikistan | After the outbreak of the Tajikistani Civil War, the local government of Gorno-Badakhshan declared itself independent but later backed down on the declaration. |
| Democratic Republic of Yemen | 1994 | Aden | Yemen | Also known as South Yemen, the Democratic Republic of Yemen, declared during the 1994 Yemeni Civil War, encompassed the entirety of the former state of South Yemen. |
| Provisional Government of National Union and National Salvation of Cambodia | 1994–1998 | Pailin | Cambodia | The rival government of the restored Kingdom of Cambodia, consisting of ex-Khmer Rouge. Dissolved following the death of Pol Pot. |
| Islamic Emirate of Badakhshan | 1996 | Badakhshan | Afghanistan | An unrecognised Islamic State in the Badakhshan Province of Afghanistan established by supporters of Burhanuddin Rabbani & Ahmad Shah Massoud. |
| Islamic Emirate of Kurdistan | 2001–2003 | Byara | Iraq | A Kurdish Islamic state established by Ansar al-Islam, Kurdistan Islamic Group and Kurdistan Islamic Movement. Dissolved in 2003 by Operation Viking Hammer. |
| Islamic Republic of Qa'im | 2005 | Al-Qa'im | Iraq | Declared by AQI during the occupation of Al-Qa'im by Al-Qaeda in Iraq in 2005. |
| Islamic Emirate of Waziristan | 2006 | ? | Pakistan | Declared by Al-Qaeda, with a governing Shura council. |
| Islamic Emirate of Rafah | 2009 | Rafah | Gaza Strip | An unrecognized Islamic state established two years after the Hamas takeover of Gaza; later collapsed after the 2009 Battle of Rafah. |
| Kurdish Supreme Committee | 2012–2013 | Kobani | Syria | A self-proclaimed governing body in Northern Syria, founded by the Kurdish Democratic Union Party and the Kurdish National Council. |
| Bangsamoro Republik | 2013 | Davao City (de jure); Zamboanga City (de facto) | Philippines | A breakaway state declared by Nur Misuari, the leader of the Moro National Liberation Front in an attempt to create a nation for the Moro people. |
| (Islamic State) Emirate of Azaz | 2013–2014 | Azaz | Syria | An emirate proclaimed by the Islamic State following its capture of Azaz in 2013. |
| (Druze) Supreme Legal Committee in Suwayda | 2025–2026 | Suwayda | Syria | The Supreme Legal Committee was dissolved in April 2026, only a year after its creation. It was replaced by the Administrative Council of Jabal Bashan. |

== Europe ==
| Name | Date | Capital | Now Part Of | Description |
|---|---|---|---|---|
| Duchy of Gniewkowo | 1373–1374; 1375–1377 | Gniewkowo | Poland | A district principality and a fiefdom within the Kingdom of Poland during the era of fragmentation that was formed in 1314 from part of the Duchy of Inowrocław. The country was located in the Kuyavia and consisted of the Gniewkowo and Słońsk lands. |
| Polish-Hungarian Union | 1440–1444 | Kraków & Buda | Poland, Hungary, Slovakia, Croatia, Serbia, Romania, Ukraine | Succeeded the initial Polish-Hungarian Union of 1370–1382. By the end of the century, Louis had no descendants. Both Mary and Hedwig had died, the former heavily pregnant and the latter soon after giving birth to a short-lived daughter. In 1440, Vladislaus III of Poland, son of Hedwig's widower and successor Władysław II Jagiełło, was elected king of Hungary. The election was fiercely disputed by Elizabeth of Luxembourg, daughter of Mary's widower and successor Sigismund. A two-year civil war ensued, ending upon Elizabeth's death in 1442. Vladislaus' own death in battle in 1444 ended the union. |
| Golden Ambrosian Republic | 1447–1450 | Milan | Italy | Founded during the Milanese War of Succession. |
| Tsardom of Bačka | 1526–1527 | Subotica | Serbia, Hungary | After the fall of the Hungarian kingdom at the Battle of Mohács, Tsar Jovan Nenad established a Serbian rump state in Vojvodina which later fell at the Battle of Sződfalva. |
| Syrmian Duchy of Radoslav Chelnik | 1527–1530/1532 | Slankamen | Serbia | Duke Radoslav Čelnik, who served in Jovan Nenad's army, transferred power from Bačka to Syrmia after the tsar's death and ruled the region for 3–5 years until the Ottomans conquered it. |
| Anabaptist Dominion of Münster | 1534–1535 | Münster | Germany | An attempt by radical Anabaptists, led by John of Leiden, to establish a communal sectarian government in the German city of Münster. |
| Kingdom of Bohemia | 1618–1620 | Prague | Czech Republic | At the beginning of the Thirty Years' War, the Bohemian kingdom declared independence from the Habsburg monarchy and temporarily elected Frederick V of the Palatinate as their new king, but the rebels were ultimately defeated at the Battle of the White Mountain. |
| Catalan Republic | 1640–1641 | Barcelona | Spain and France | An independent state under French protection, established in September 1640 by the Junta de Braços (Assembly of Estates) of the Principality of Catalonia led by the President of the Generalitat, Pau Claris, during the Reapers' War (1640–1652). On 23 January 1641, due to the desperate military situation, the Junta offered to Louis XIII the title of Count of Barcelona, beginning the process to put Catalonia in a personal union with the Kingdom of France, culminating in December 1641. |
| Grand Duchy of Lithuania | 1655–1657 | Kėdainiai | Lithuania, Belarus, Poland | Declared by cousins Janusz and Bogusław Radziwiłł in collusion with Sweden seeking the independence of Lithuania from Poland and the dissolution of the Polish–Lithuanian Commonwealth, the end goal was to establish a new Swedish–Lithuanian personal union in order to further prevent Russia from accessing the Baltic Sea. The Lithuanian Protestant elite strongly supported this move in opposition to Polish Catholic domination. Ended after the Battle of Prostki and expulsion of Swedish troops from Biržai Castle when Swedish taxation policies proved to be widely unpopular among Lithuanian nobles. |
| Grand Principality of Ruthenia | 1658 | Kiev | Ukraine and Belarus | A project of Ruthenia (Ukraine) as a member of the Polish–Lithuanian–Ruthenian Commonwealth in the territory of Kiev Voivodeship, Bracław Voivodeship and Chernihiv Voivodeship. Its creation was proposed by Hetman Ivan Vyhovsky with Yuri Nemyrych and Pavlo Teteria in September 1658 during the negotiations between the Cossack Hetmanate and the Commonwealth. The project of the Duchy was approved in the first version of the Treaty of Hadiach, but later, because of the strong resistance of Polish society, the idea of the Grand Principality of Rus was completely abandoned. |
| Principality of Upper Hungary | 1682–1685 | Košice | Slovakia, Hungary, Romania, Ukraine | A vassal state of the Ottoman Empire ruled by Emeric Thököly, it was endorsed by Hungarian nobles who opposed Habsburg rule of Hungary. |
| Kingdom of Kumanovo | 1689 | Kumanovo | North Macedonia | During the anti-Ottoman uprising from October to November 1689 in the region of Vardar Macedonia, its leader Karposh was known as the "King of Kumanovo", a title conferred upon him by Austrian Emperor Leopold I, who sent him a busby as a gift and sign of recognition. |
| Principality of Catalonia (pro-Habsburg) | 1713–1714 | Barcelona | Spain | A quasi-republican government, nominally loyal to Habsburg pretender Charles III, led by the institutions of the Principality of Catalonia during the War of the Catalans (1713–1714), the last phase of the War of the Spanish Succession. Proclaiming on 9 July 1713 the continuation of the war against Philip V and France, despite the Treaty of Utrecht, its defeat led to the suppression of the institutions and legal system of Catalonia, which ended its status as separate state and its annexation by the new Kingdom of Spain. |
| Kingdom of Corsica | 1736 | Cervione & Corte | France | A kingdom on the island of Corsica established by Corsican rebels and exiles led by German explorer Theodor Stephan Freiherr von Neuhoff, overthrowing the ruling Republic of Genoa until infighting among the rebels soon led to their defeat. |
| United Belgian States | 1789–1790 | Brussels | Belgium | A confederate republic established in the Southern Netherlands during the Brabant Revolution against the Habsburg Emperor, Joseph II. |
| Republic of Liège | 1789–1791 | Liège | Belgium | A Republic established in the Prince-Bishopric of Liège during the Liège Revolution but was quickly annexed by French revolutionary forces |
| Kingdom of France | 1791–1792 | Paris | France | A constitutional monarchy that succeeded the autocratic Kingdom of France after King Louis XVI accepted the French Constitution of 1791. After the Storming of the Tuileries Palace on the 10 August 1792, the monarchy was suspended and was abolished by the National Convention in September. |
| Republic of Mainz | 1793 | Mainz | Germany | One of the first French Sister Republics and the first democratic state in modern-day Germany; soon retaken by Prussian forces. |
| Republic of Bouillon | 1794–1795 | Bouillon? | Switzerland | A possible French client state formed out of the former Duchy of Bouillon but was soon incorporated into the Grand Duchy of Luxembourg. |
| Republic of Alba | 1796 | Alba | Italy | Proclaimed on 26 April 1796, in Alba, Piedmont, when the town was taken by the French army. The municipality had a very short life of only 2 days, as the Armistice of Cherasco on 28 April 1796 handed back civil control of all Piedmont to King Victor Amadeus III of Sardinia. |
| Bolognese Republic | 1796 | Bologna | Italy | Created in 1796 in the Central Italian city of Bologna. It merged the existing provinces of Bologna and Ferrara into one. |
| Republic Reggiana | 1796 | Reggio Emilia | Italy | An Italian Sister republic established during the Italian campaigns of the French Revolutionary Wars. |
| Cispadane Republic | 1796–1797 | Bologna | Italy | A client republic located in northern Italy, founded in 1796 with the protection of the French army, led by Napoleon Bonaparte. In the following year, it was merged with the Transpadane Republic (formerly the Duchy of Milan until 1796) to form the Cisalpine Republic. The Cispadane Republic was the first Italian sovereign state to adopt the Italian tricolour as its flag. |
| (Italy) Transpadane Republic | 1796–1797 | Milan | Italy | A sister republic of France established in Milan. |
| Republic of Crema | 1797 | Crema | Italy | A revolutionary municipality in Lombardy, which was created when the French Army entered Crema on 28 March 1797. |
| Astese Republic | 1797 | Asti | Italy | In 1797, the Astigiani, enraged by continuous military campaigns and their resulting poor economic situation, revolted against the Savoyard government. On July 28, the Repubblica Astese was declared. It was suppressed only two days later; the revolutionary chiefs were arrested and executed. |
| Republic of Brescia | 1797 | Brescia | Italy | A temporary French client republic in Italy. Established March 18, 1797 in the wake of the French occupation of Brescia and Bergamo, it became part of the Cisalpine Republic November 20, 1797. |
| Republic of Bergamo | 1797 | Bergamo | Italy | Shortlived French client republic in Bergamo. |
| Anconine Republic | 1797–1798 | Ancona | Italy | Italian Sister republic established during the Italian campaigns of the French Revolutionary Wars. |
| (French First Republic) Tiberina Republic | 1798 | Perugia | Italy | A revolutionary municipality proclaimed on 4 February 1798 when republicans took power in the city of Perugia. It was an occupation zone that took its name from the river Tiber. A month later, the government of all the Papal States was changed into a republic: the Roman Republic, which Perugia belonged to. |
| Lemanic Republic | 1798 | Lausanne | Switzerland | A state orchestrated by Frédéric-César de La Harpe, the tutor of the children of Tsar Paul I of Russia, to regain the independence of the Vaud. |
| Tellgovie | 1798 | Schwyz | Switzerland | One of the three Swiss states created in 1798 from the Canton of Waldstätten and the Three Leagues, later reincorporated into the Helvetic Republic after public outcry. |
| Republic of Connacht | 1798 | Castlebar | Ireland | A Sister Republic of France established during the Irish Rebellion of 1798 by the Society of United Irishmen, led by Wolfe Tone. |
| Roman Republic | 1798–1799 | Rome | Italy | A state established after Louis-Alexandre Berthier occupied the Papal states. It proved short-lived, as the Kingdom of Naples invaded and restored the Papacy. |
| Gozitan Nation | 1798–1800 | Rabat | Malta | A monarchy located on the island of Gozo between 1798 and 1801 during the French Revolutionary Wars. |
| Helvetic Republic | 1798–1803 | Aarau (1798); Lucerne (1798–1799); Bern (1799–1803) | Switzerland | A Napoleonic Sister republic replacing the Old Swiss Confederacy after its invasion by the French. However, after French withdrawal and the Stecklikrieg, Napoleon ordered the Act of Mediation, replacing the Republic with the Swiss Confederation. |
| State of Lucca | 1799 | Lucca | Italy | After the War of the First Coalition that ended with the Treaty of Campo Formio, the Republic of Lucca started negotiations with the newly formed Cisalpine Republic with the aim of maintaining its independence. Jurist Luigi Matteucci, father of the more famous Felice, was sent to Milan to negotiate with Napoleon. Lucca was the only territory in all of continental Italy that the French army had not yet invaded; Matteucci's proposals were rejected. On 22 January 1799, French troops entered the city, overthrowing the oligarchic republic and establishing a new centralized republic, with a democratic constitution, as a French protectorate. The constitution granted the government to an Executive Directory, with a bicameral legislature composed of the Council of Juniors and the Council of Seniors. |
| Republic of Pescara | 1799 | Pescara | Italy | A provisional Jacobin government established in the fortress city of Pescara in 1799. It was a client state of the French First Republic and part of the wider Parthenopean Republic. |
| Republic of Altamura | 1799 | Altamura | Italy | A three-month self-government period of the Italian town of Altamura, right after the birth of the Parthenopean Republic (23 January 1799) which ousted the Bourbons and the Kingdom of Naples. The city of Naples was then defeated and taken by the so-called Sanfedisti, led by cardinal Fabrizio Ruffo, after a battle on the city walls. After being defeated, most Altamurans managed to flee through Porta Bari, one of Altamura's main gates. |
| Grand Duchy of Lithuania | 1812 | Vilnius | Lithuania; Poland; Belarus | A Napoleonic attempt at restoring the historical Grand Duchy of Lithuania after the Grande Armée occupied Vilnius on 28 June 1812. Established on 1 July 1812, the provisional government had seven committees, a president, and an army that cost 500,000 francs to create, along with a native Lithuanian regiment which served in Napoleon's Imperial Guard. The Grand Duchy was dissolved during the French Retreat in the aftermath of the catastrophic French invasion of Russia. |
| Lithuanian Provisional Governing Commission | 1812–1813 | Vilnius | Lithuania; Poland; Belarus | A Napoleonic client administration created out of areas of the Russian Empire conquered during French invasion of Russia. In 1813, the Governing Commission was merged into the General Confederation of the Kingdom of Poland, the reconstituted Duchy of Warsaw. |
| Kingdom of Poland | 1812–1813 | Warsaw | Poland | A puppet state of France that was made from the reorganised Duchy of Warsaw during Napoleon's Russian campaign. |
| Kingdom of Norway | 1814 | Oslo | Norway | A monarchy established by Norwegian nationalists when Denmark ceded Norway to Sweden, due to its alliance with France during the Napoleonic Wars. The Norwegian state was quickly defeated in the two week long Swedish–Norwegian War. |
| State of Franche-Comté | 1814 | Vesoul | France | A buffer state established between Germany and the First French Empire after the latter's fall. It was soon dissolved following the Treaty of Paris. |
| General-Government of Belgium | 1814–1815 | Brussels | Belgium | A provisional government established by the 1814 Treaty of Paris in the aftermath of the Napoleonic Wars. Later united with the Sovereign Principality of the United Netherlands to form the United Kingdom of the Netherlands. |
| Republic of Genoa | 1814–1815 | Genoa | Italy | A brief post-Napoleonic attempt at restoring the historical Republic of Genoa prior to its dissolution at the Congress of Vienna. |
| Principality of Elba | 1814–1815 | Portoferraio | Italy | A brief monarchy established on the Italian island of Elba granted to Napoleon Bonaparte. Intended to be returned to France after his death, but was ultimately ephemeral, with Napoleon's return to France during the Hundred Days and exile to the island of Saint Helena. |
| Republic of Pontecorvo | 1820–1821 | Pontecorvo | Italy | In April 1820, the Carbonari, a secretive revolutionary organisation, unilaterally declared the secession of the exclave of Pontecorvo from the Papal States. Pontecorvo requested twice to join the Kingdom of the Two Sicilies but both attempts were refused, with the Two Sicilies wishing not to negotiate the affairs of the exclave except through the Pope. The republic was occupied by Austrian forces in March 1821, who restored it to the Papal States. |
| Messenian Senate | 1821 | Kalamata | Greece | An unrecognised protostate during the Greek war of independence. It was the first move towards the creation of the Peloponnesian Senate. |
| Achaean Directory | 1821–1822 | Patras | Greece | An unrecognised protostate during the Greek war of independence. It was a form of local administration that operated in Achaia during the first months of the war. |
| Senate of Western Continental Greece | 1821–1823 | Missolonghi | Greece | An unrecognised protostate during the Greek war of independence. It was a provisional regime that existed in western Central Greece during the early stages of the war. |
| Peloponnesian Senate | 1821–1823 | Tripoli | Greece | An unrecognised protostate during the Greek war of independence. It was a provisional regime that existed in the Peloponnese during the early stages of the war. |
| Areopagus of Eastern Continental Greece | 1821–1825 | Amfissa | Greece | An unrecognised protostate during the Greek war of independence. It was a provisional regime that existed in eastern Central Greece during the war. |
| Provisional Government of the Island of Crete | 1822 | Armeni | Greece | An unrecognised protostate during the Greek war of independence. It was equivalent to the First National Assembly of Epidaurus that had preceded it. |
| Polish National Government | 1830–1831 | Warsaw | Poland | A provisional government established by Polish revolutionaries during the November Uprising. |
| (Italy) Italian United Provinces | 1831 | Bologna | Italy | A revolutionary government established during the Revolutions of 1830, when the temporal power of the Pope and the Emilian Dukes were declared to be revoked, and lasted until Austrian troops took the city of Ancona. |
| Kingdom of Poland | 1831 | Warsaw | Poland | A Polish shadow government established during the November Uprising. |
| Sonderbund | 1845–1847 | ? | Switzerland | A rival confederation which broke away from Switzerland in 1845 to protect its interests against a centralization of power. |
| Polish National Government | 1846 | Kraków | Poland | An attempt at creating a Polish government during the Kraków uprising. |
| Republic of Mosina | 1848 | Mosina | Poland | A microstate centred around the Polish city of Mosina during the Greater Poland Uprising. |
| Kingdom of Sicily | 1848 | Palermo | Italy | An Italian revolutionary state established during the Revolutions of 1848. |
| Provisional Government of Milan | 1848 | Milan | Italy | An Italian revolutionary state established during the Revolutions of 1848. |
| Republic of San Marco | 1848–1849 | Venice | Italy | Following 1848 unrests, the republic was proclaimed in 1848 in the territories of Venetia with the capital Venice. Allied with the other Italian states against the Austrian Empire, it eventually voted to federate under the Kingdom of Sardinia, but returned to independence after Piedmontese defeat. With only Venice and its lagoon remaining under control, the republic surrendered after almost 5 months of siege and 17 months of existence. |
| Free Cities of Menton and Roquebrune | 1848–1849 | Roquebrune & Menton | France | A union of two cities who seceded from Monaco due to high tax rates and increasing poverty, later absorbed by the Kingdom of Piedmont-Sardinia. |
| German Empire | 1848–1849 | Frankfurt | Germany | A failed attempt to unify the states of the German Confederation. |
| Serbian Vojvodina | 1848–1849 | Sremski Karlovci; Zemun; Veliki Bečkerek; Timișoara | Serbia | A self-proclaimed autonomous province within the Austrian Empire during the Revolutions of 1848, which existed until 1849 when it became the Voivodeship of Serbia and Banat. It was created and led by Serb political leaders in regions of Syrmia, Banat, Bačka and Baranja. The Serbian Vojvodina gave its name to the present Vojvodina autonomous region in Serbia. |
| Roman Republic | 1849 | Rome | Italy | A republican government established when Pope Pius IX fled to Gaeta due to riots and protests by liberals due to the assassination of minister of justice Pellegrino Rossi. |
| Tuscan Republic | 1849 | Florence | Italy | A republican government established when Leopold II, Grand Duke of Tuscany fled Florence joining Pope Pius IX in Gaeta. |
| Hungarian State | 1849 | Buda | Hungary | An unrecognized state established during the last four months of the Hungarian Revolution of 1848. |
| United Provinces of Central Italy | 1859–1860 | Modena | Italy | A client state of the Kingdom of Piedmont-Sardinia, formed as a union of the pro-Piedmontese governments of the Grand Duchy of Tuscany, the Duchy of Parma, the Duchy of Modena and the Papal Legations after the Second Italian War of Independence. The United Provinces were soon annexed to Piedmont-Sardinia. |
| Polish National Government | 1863–1864 | Warsaw; Vilnius; Kiev | Poland | A Polish shadow government established during the January Uprising. |
| Republic of Ploiești | 1870 | Ploiești | Romania | An anti-monarchist rebellion against King Carol I. |
| First Paris Commune | 1870 | Paris | France | On October 31, 1870, a popular insurrection occupied Paris's City Hall (Hôtel de Ville). Amidst the Franco-Prussian War, Parisians simultaneously heard of losses at Le Bourget and Metz alongside armistice negotiations. Incensed by what they viewed as treason, a group of 300 to 400 demonstrated at the City Hall, and members of the left-wing National Guard captured and occupied the building with several members of the Government of National Defense inside. |
| Lyon Commune | 1870–1871 | Lyon | France | In 1870–1871, Republicans and activists from several far-left elements of the time seized power in Lyon and established an autonomous government. The commune organized elections, but dissolved after the restoration of a republican "normality", which frustrated the most radical elements hoping for a different revolution. The radicals twice tried to regain power without success. The Lyon events happened in the context of a revolutionary wave of series of similar uprisings in most major French cities in the aftermath of the collapse of the Second French Empire, culminating in the 1871 Paris Commune. |
| Besançon Commune | 1871 | Besançon | France | A revolutionary movement conceived and developed in 1871, aiming at the proclamation of a local autonomous power based on the experiences of the Paris and Lyon Communes. |
| Second Paris Commune | 1871 | Paris | France | A French revolutionary government that seized power in Paris on 18 March 1871 and controlled parts of the city until 28 May 1871. |
| Le Creusot Commune | 1871 | Le Creusot | France | A brief insurrectionary commune proclaimed in Le Creusot in March 1871. |
| Marseille Commune | 1871 | Marseille | France | An insurrectionary communalist movement declared in solidarity with the Paris Commune uprising of March 18, 1871. It aimed to support the nascent republic against the maneuvers of the "Versaillais" and to enable the city of Marseille to govern its own interests. The movement united republicans, moderates, Blanquists, socialists, and members of the First International of various persuasions. |
| Narbonne Commune | 1871 | Narbonne | France | The popular insurrection and revolutionary administration established in Narbonne between March 24 and 31, 1871, comparable to other Communes of the same type during the same period in France. |
| Croatian People's Government | 1871 | Rakovica | Croatia | An attempt by Croatian revolutionary Eugen Kvaternik at restoring Croatian statehood after 769 years of foreign rule. The revolt lasted from 8 October 1871 to 11 October 1871. |
| (Catalonia) Catalan State | 1873 | Barcelona | Spain | A federated state proclaimed by the Provincial Council of Barcelona, encompassing Catalonia and the Balearic Islands, established in order to federalize the newly established First Spanish Republic. After multiple promises from the Spanish government, the proclamation was suspended. Throughout the summer of 1873, there were multiple attempts to re-establish the Catalan State. |
| Committee of Public Safety | 1873 | Alcoy | Spain | A syndicalist revolt in the city of Alcoy during the Sexenio Democrático. Alcoy was one of the most impoverished cities in Spain at the time, which lead to a revolt and the death of mayor Agustí Albors. The rebels established a provisional government headed by anarchist Severino Albarracín, who led the people of the city until occupation by a federal army. |
| Canton of Algeciras | 1873 | Algeciras | Spain | A national entity that was part of the revolutionary movement in of Algeciras during the First Spanish Republic, known as the cantonalist movement. |
| Canton of Alicante | 1873 | Alicante | Spain | A canton formed during the Cantonal Rebellion that took place in Spain under the First Spanish Republic. It was created on 20 July as a result of a maritime expedition from the Canton of Cartagena (also known as Murcian Canton), but as soon as the Murcian envoys left to return to Cartagena, the centralist (supporters of the Madrid government) local authorities regained control and put an end to the canton on 23 July. |
| Canton of Málaga | 1873 | Málaga | Spain | Created during the Cantonal Rebellion of 1873. |
| Valencian Canton | 1873 | Valencia | Spain | One of the first independent cantons proclaimed in the Cantonal Rebellion during the First Spanish Republic (1873–1874). It was officially proclaimed on July 18, 1873, and 178 municipalities of the Valencia province adhered to it. It fell on August 8, when the troops of Martínez Campos, sent by the federal republican government of Nicolás Salmerón, entered the city of Valencia, causing the surrender of the canton. |
| Canton of Cartagena | 1873–1874 | Cartagena | Spain | In 1873, Cartagena was proclaimed as an independent canton, starting the Cantonal Rebellion in Spain during the First Spanish Republic. It was the beginning of cantonalism, a movement that sought to establish a federal state composed of autonomous cantons. Some cities and territories joined the cantonal cause and were declared independents too, but surrendered a few days later. The only canton with an organized government as state, control of its territory, and military power was Cartagena, which declared war and faced the Spanish central government for six months until it was invaded. |
| First Spanish Republic | 1873–1874 | Madrid | Spain | A political regime that was founded after the abdication of Amadeo I of Spain and lasted until the January 1874 coup of Pavía. |
| Gurian Republic | 1902–1906 | Ozurgeti | Georgia | An insurrection that took place in the western Georgian province Guria (then part of Imperial Russia) prior to and during the Russian Revolution of 1905. It existed from November 1905 to January 10, 1906. |
| Strandzha Commune | 1903 | Malko Tarnovo | Bulgaria & Turkey | A rebel polity in the Ottoman Empire region during the Ilinden–Preobrazhenie Uprising. |
| Kruševo Republic | 1903 | Kruševo | North Macedonia | A republic established in Kruševo, North Macedonia at the start of the Ilinden Uprising. It lasted solely 10 days, from the 3rd to the 13th of August. It can be considered as one of the first modern governments with leftist views, as both president Nikola Karev Kruševo Manifesto co-writer Nikola Kirov were members of the Bulgarian Social Democratic Workers' Party. |
| Shuliavka Republic | 1905 | Shuliavka | Ukraine | The Shuliavka Republic was an early 20th-century worker-based quasi-government organization in the city of Kiev, Ukraine whose main task was self-defence. The uprising lasted a total of four days, from December 12–16 (o.s., in the Gregorian Calendar, 26–29), 1905. |
| Liubotyn Republic | 1905 | Liubotyn | Ukraine | An independent workers' state proclaimed in December 1905 after an armed insurrection of the workers and railwaymen in Lyubotin during the Russian Revolution of 1905. It existed from December 26 to 30, 1905. |
| Republic of Zagłębie | 1905 | Zagłębie Dąbrowskie | Poland | The Polish town Zagłębie Dąbrowskie was taken over by revolutionaries during the Russian Revolution of 1905. It existed for 10 to 12 days in November–December 1905. |
| Republic of Sławków | 1905 | Sławków | Poland | The Polish town Sławków was taken over by revolutionaries during the Russian Revolution of 1905. It existed for 10 to 12 days in November–December 1905. |
| Chita Republic | 1905–1906 | Chita | Russia | A workers and peasants' dictatory republic in Chita during the Russian Revolution of 1905, installed by a seizure of power in the Chita RSDLP Committee and the Council of Soldiers' and Cossacks' Deputies from November 1905 to January 1906. |
| Stary Buyan Republic | 1905–1906 | Stary Buya | Russia | A peasant self-government established during the First Russian Revolution in the village of Stary Buyan, lasting from 12 to 26 November 1905. |
| Krasnoyarsk Republic | 1905–1906 | Krasnoyarsk | Russia | Organized by the Joint Board of Workers' and Soldiers' Deputies in Krasnoyarsk during the First Russian Revolution. Lasted from 9 to 27 December 1905. |
| Novorossiysk Republic | 1905–1906 | Novorossiysk | Russia | A worker-peasant self-government established by the Council of Workers' Deputies in Novorossiysk on 12 December 1905 and lasted until 26 December of the same year. |
| Sochi Republic | 1905–1906 | Sochi | Russia | Lasted from December 28, 1905 to January 5, 1906. |
| Markovo Republic | 1905–1906 | Markovo | Russia | A self-proclaimed peasant state in the Volokolamsk area. It was proclaimed on October 18, 1905, when during the Russian Revolution of 1905 peasants took control of the local government in the village Markovo and 5 other villages. It existed until July 18, 1906. |
| Comrat Republic | 1906 | Comrat | Moldova | Established in the village of Comrat in the Bessarabia Governorate, in protest of the tsarist regime. It was created after a mutiny by socialist revolutionary Andrey Galatsan with the support of the local Gagauz population. It lasted from 6 January to 12 January and is today viewed positively in Gagauzia as a premonition of future Gagauz territorial autonomy. |
| Free State of Ikaria | 1912 | Agios Kirykos | Greece | In the lead-up to the First Balkan War, the island of Icaria expelled the Ottoman garrisson on the island, declared independence, and liberated the nearby archipelago of Fournoi Korseon. The free state was later annexed by Greece and recognised as Greek territory by the Ottomans in the Treaty of London (1913). |
| Provisional Government of Western Thrace | 1913 | Komotini | Greece | An Ottoman-backed autonomous state in Western Thrace when Bulgaria was awarded the region in the Treaty of Bucharest (1913), it was then occupied by French forces and later annexed by Greece. |
| Provisional Government of Megisti | 1913–1914 | Kastellorizo | Greece | During the Balkan Wars, the inhabitants of the island of Kastellorizo, under the control of the Ottoman Empire at the time, revolted and exiled their Turkish governor and requested to unite with the Kingdom of Greece. Their request was denied by the Greeks, so the populace established their own provisional government with the covert support of the Greek government. It lasted until an assembly of the Great Powers in London returned the island to the Ottomans. |
| Republic of Central Albania | 1913–1914 | Durrës | Albania | Established by future president of Albania Essad Toptani in the aftermath of the Balkan Wars. It lasted until William of Wied arrived and established the Principality of Albania. |
| Autonomous Republic of Northern Epirus | 1914 | Gjirokastër | Albania | A provisional government established by Albanian Greeks in southern Albania after the First Balkan War. |
| Senate of Central Albania | 1914–1916 | Durrës | Albania | A provisional government established by pro-Ottoman Muslim rebels led by Essad Toptani, who fled the country in 1916. |
| Republic of Van | 1915–1918 | Van | Turkey | A puppet government of the Russian Empire in occupied Western Armenia. Dissolved in the Treaty of Brest-Litovsk following the February Revolution and the Russian Soviet Federative Socialist Republic (RSFSR)'s withdrawal from World War I. |
| Provisional Government of the Irish Republic | 1916 | Dublin | Ireland | The revolutionary government declared by Padraig Pearse in the Proclamation of the Irish Republic during the Easter Rising of 1916; it lasted until the suppression of the uprising. |
| State of Thessaloniki | 1916 | Thessaloniki | Greece | A parallel government established by former Greek Prime Minister Eleftherios Venizelos over King Constantine I's policy of neutrality during World War I. |
| Autonomous Province of Korçë | 1916–1920 | Korçë | Albania | An autonomous legal entity established in December 1916 by the local French forces after the city of Korçë fell under their control during World War I, and which lasted until 1920. During this time, 14 representatives of Korçë and French Colonel Descoins signed a protocol that proclaimed the Autonomous Albanian Province of Korçë under the military protection of the French army, with Themistokli Gërmenji as Prefect of Police. The new authorities introduced Albanian and French as the official language and replaced Greek schools with Albanian ones, which were forbidden during the Greek administration of the city. There was also a French school in Korçë, and one of its many students, and later teachers, was Enver Hoxha, the future leader of communist Albania. |
| Samarina Republic | 1917 | Samarina | Greece | An attempt at creating an Aromanian state. |
| (Russia) Special Transcaucasian Committee | 1917 | Tbilisi | Georgia | A reorganization of South Caucasian and Eastern Anatolian territories following the February Revolution. |
| Iskolat | 1917–1918 | Cēsis & Valka | Latvia | A pro-Communist governing body in Latvia established during the early stages of the Russian Revolution, which soon fled to Moscow when the Germans occupied all of Latvia. |
| Borcali Karapapak Turkish Republic | 1917–1918 | Borcali | Georgia | A self-declared state established by Karapapak Turks amid regional upheaval and ethnic strife. |
| (Russia) Russian Republic | 1917–1918 | Saint Petersburg | Russia | Declared by the Russian Provisional Government after the fall of the Russian Empire. |
| The South-Eastern Union of Cossack Troops, Highlanders of the Caucasus, and Free Peoples of the Steppes | 1917–1918 | Yekaterinodar | Ukraine and Russia | An anti-Bolshevik confederation. |
| Kingdom of Poland (1917–1918) | 1917–1918 | Warsaw | Poland | A polity proclaimed during World War I by Germany and Austria-Hungary on 5 November 1916 on the territories of formerly Russian-ruled Congress Poland held by the Central Powers as the Government General of Warsaw, which became active on 14 January 1917. It was subsequently transformed between 7 October 1918 and 22 November 1918 into the independent Second Polish Republic, the customary ceremonial founding date of the latter being later set at 11 November 1918. |
| Soviet Republic of Soldiers and Fortress-Builders of Naissaar | 1917–1918 | ? | Estonia | A Soviet republic declared by anarcho-syndicalist and future leader of the Kronstadt rebellion Stepan Petrichenko and the crew of the battleship Petropavlovsk, on the Estonian island of Naissaar. |
| Autonomous Governorate of Estonia | 1917–1918 | Reval | Estonia | A Bolshevik government of the Governorate of Estonia and the Governorate of Livonia founded during the early days of the Russian Provisional Government. It collapsed after the breakdown of peace talks between the German Empire and Soviet Russia and the subsequent Great Retreat, which led to the Estonian Declaration of Independence and the establishment of an independent Estonia. |
| Moldavian Democratic Republic | 1917–1918 | Chișinău | Moldova | After the February Revolution, the Sfatul Țării, a council of political, public, cultural, and professional organizations in the Governorate of Bessarabia which worked as the republic's parliament, declared Bessarabia an autonomous state of the Russian Democratic Federative Republic until it was dissolved in the October Revolution. The Sfatul Țării, fearing a Bolshevik invasion, declared independence and later voted to unite with Romania. |
| Ukrainian People's Republic of Soviets | 1917–1918 | Kharkiv | Ukraine | A Soviet republic of the RSFSR, it later merged with the Odessa Soviet Republic to form the Ukrainian Soviet Republic. |
| Crimean People's Republic | 1917–1918 | Bakhchysarai | Ukraine | An autonomous state declared by the Kurultai of the Crimean Tatars during the turmoil of the Russian Revolution. |
| Mountainous Republic of the Northern Caucasus | 1917–1919 | Temir-Khan-Shura | Russia | Declared on 11 May 1918 at the time of the collapse of the Russian Tsarist empire during the Russian Revolution of 1917. The capital was initially Vladikavkaz, but was later relocated to Temir-Khan-Shura after being occupied by the Red Army. The Republic was dissolved in 1919 after being occupied by the Volunteer Army of the White movement. |
| Bashkurdistan | 1917–1919 | Orenburg & Chelyabinsk | Russia | After the Russian Revolution, the All-Bashkir Qoroltays concluded that it was necessary to form an independent Bashkir republic within Russia. As a result, on 15 November 1917, the Bashkir Regional Shuro (Council), ruled by Äxmätzäki Wälidi Tıwğan, proclaimed the establishment of the first independent Bashkir Republic in areas of predominantly Bashkir population: Orenburg, Perm, Samara, Ufa, and the autonomous Bashkurdistan on November 15, 1917. This effectively made Bashkurdistan the first ever democratic Turkic republic in history, preceding Crimea, Idel-Ural, and Azerbaijan. Annexed by the Russian Soviet Federative Socialist Republic in March 1919 and succeeded by the Bashkir Autonomous Soviet Socialist Republic. |
| Orenburg Cossack Republic | 1917–1920 | Orenburg | Russia | A provisional government established by Cossacks in Orenburg. |
| Makhnovshchina | 1917–1921 | Huliaipole ( Makhnograd) | Ukraine | A mass movement to establish anarchist communism in southern and eastern Ukraine during the Ukrainian War of Independence of 1917–1921. Named after Nestor Makhno, the commander-in-chief of the Revolutionary Insurgent Army of Ukraine, its aim was to create a system of free soviets that would manage the transition towards a stateless and classless society. |
| Ukrainian People's Republic | 1917–1921 | Kyiv | Ukraine | Succeeded by the Ukrainian Soviet Socialist Republic. |
| Ukrainian State | 1918 | Kyiv | Ukraine | An anti-Bolshevik German client state led by Pavlo Skoropadskyi that overthrew the socialist Ukrainian People's Republic. Skoropadskyi was soon overthrown in the Anti-Hetman Uprising. |
| Republic of Zakopane | 1918 | Zakopane | Poland | An entity centred in the town of Zakopane with the intention of joining the newley declared Second Polish Republic. It was eventually absorbed by the Polish Liquidation Committee. |
| Eastern Slovak Republic | 1918 | Košice | Slovakia | A state in Eastern Slovakia based around the Slovjak movement that aimed to unite with the newly established First Hungarian Republic instead of the First Czechoslovak Republic. The Republic fell with the advance of Czechoslovak troops into the region. |
| Kingdom of Lithuania | 1918 | Vilnius | Lithuania | A German client state ruled by Mindaugas II. |
| United Baltic Duchy | 1918 | Riga | Lithuania, Latvia & Estonia | A German client state ruled by Adolf Pilar von Pilchau. |
| Duchy of Courland and Semigallia | 1918 | Riga | Latvia | A German client state ruled directly by Kaiser Wilhelm II. |
| Idel-Ural State | 1918 | Ufa | Russia | An ethnic confederation aimed at uniting the Volga Tatars, Bashkirs, and Chuvash. The Bolsheviks later replaced it with the Tatar-Bashkir Soviet Socialist Republic. |
| (Russia) Supreme Administration of Northern Region | 1918 | Arkhangelsk | Russia | An Entente-backed anti-Bolshevik left-wing government centred around Arkhangelsk in the tumult of the Russian Civil War. The Supreme Administration soon merged with the Murmansk Krai to form the Provisional Government of the Northern Region. |
| State of Slovenes, Croats and Serbs | 1918 | Zagreb | Slovenia, Croatia, Bosnia and Herzegovina | A provisional government established out of Austro-Hungarian-controlled territory in the Balkans. 33 days after its proclamation, the State merged with the Kingdom of Serbia to form the Kingdom of Yugoslavia. |
| Transcaucasian Democratic Federative Republic | 1918 | Tbilisi | Georgia, Armenia & Azerbaijan | A federation of the Georgian, Armenian and Azerbaijani peoples in the Caucasus. It dissolved due to infighting, splitting into separate states. |
| Republic of Heinzenland | 1918 | Mattersburg | Austria | An attempt by Germans in Western Hungary, supported by Austria, to join Austria. |
| First Republic of Pińczów | 1918 | Pińczów | Poland | An area of Pińczów and the surrounding area was occupied at the end of 1918 for a period of six weeks by the city's inhabitants, led by Jan Lisowski, after the disarmament of Austrian troops without a fight. |
| Republic of Vorarlberg | 1918 | Bregenz | Austria | During the chaos of the dissolution of the Austro-Hungarian Empire, the inhabitants of Vorarlberg in western Austria declared their own republic and unite with Switzerland. The Swiss rejected annexing the Republic of fear of military retaliation from the Austrians. |
| Alsace Soviet Republic | 1918 | Strasbourg | France | A Soviet Republic that existed in Alsace from 10 to 22 November 1918. |
| Soldiers' Council of Strasbourg | 1918 | Strasbourg | France | A revolutionary government established at the same time as the German revolution of 1918–1919. |
| Mainz Workers' and Soldiers' Council | 1918 | Mainz | Germany | Was the effective government of Mainz from 9 November until the arrival of French troops on 9 December 1918 during the German Revolution of 1918. |
| Banat Republic | 1918 | Timișoara | Romania | A socialist republic established in the multi-ethnic territory of the Banat to stop the region being divided. The aim of the republic was not accomplished, with the territory being divided between the Kingdom of Yugoslavia, the Kingdom of Romania and the Kingdom of Hungary. |
| Chuvashia | 1918 | ? | Russia | The third indigenous Volga state declared during the Russian Civil War, after Idel-Ural and Bashkurdistan. |
| Terek Soviet Republic | 1918 | Pyatigorsk & Vladikavkaz | Russia | A republic on the territory of the former Terek Oblast. Its capital was first Pyatigorsk, and later Vladikavkaz. |
| Don Soviet Republic | 1918 | Rostov-on-Don | Russia | A republic of the RSFSR that existed from March to May 1918. Claiming the territory of the Don Host Oblast, the republic was proclaimed in March 1918 after the retreat of the White Army from the area. In May, after the revolt of the Don Cossacks and the German advance into the region as a result of the Treaty of Brest-Litovsk, the republic was overthrown and its leaders fled. The Don Cossacks' Don Republic took over the territory of the Don Soviet Republic. |
| Stavropol Soviet Republic | 1918 | Stavropol | Russia | A republic on the territory of the former Stavropol Governorate of the Russian Empire. Its capital was Stavropol. It was merged into the North Caucasian Soviet Republic. |
| Kuban-Black Sea Soviet Republic | 1918 | Krasnodar | Russia | A republic of the RSFSR. Its capital was Yekaterinodar, now known as Krasnodar. It was created by merging the Black Sea Soviet Republic and Kuban Soviet Republic. Later, it was itself merged into the North Caucasian Soviet Republic. Its leader was Avran Rubin. |
| Kazan Soviet Workers' and Peasants' Republic | 1918 | Kazan | Russia | Created in opposition to the formation of the Idel-Ural State, by agreement of the parties that were part of the Kazan Soviet at the end of February 1918, and liquidated on May 16, 1918 by decision of the executive committee of the Kazan Provincial Soviet. |
| Donetsk–Krivoy Rog Soviet Republic | 1918 | Kharkiv & Luhansk | Ukraine | A self-declared Soviet republic of the Ukrainian People's Republic of Soviets proclaimed on 12 February 1918. It was founded three days after the government of the Ukrainian People's Republic (UPR) signed the Treaty of Brest-Litovsk with the Central Powers, which recognised the borders of the UPR. Lenin did not support the creation of the entity, and neither did Sverdlov. |
| Taurida Soviet Socialist Republic | 1918 | Simferopol | Ukraine | An unsuccessful attempt to establish a Soviet republic situated in the Crimean Peninsula. |
| Crimean Regional Government | 1918 | Simferopol | Ukraine | A German puppet state in Crimea that collapsed soon after the withdrawal of German forces. |
| Crimean Frontier Government | 1918 | Simferopol | Ukraine | An Allied-backed government in Crimea that rose after the fall of the regional government. The new state soon started to crumble due to tensions with Anton Denikin's Volunteer Army, and fell after the Allies withdrew. |
| Republic of Ostrów | 1918 | Ostrów Wielkopolski | Poland | An autonomous republic founded in the city of Ostrów Wielkopolski a month before the Greater Poland uprising. |
| Finnish Socialist Workers' Republic | 1918 | Helsinki | Finland | A Soviet-backed socialist state in Finland during the Finnish Civil War. The Workers Republic was soon defeated in the decisive Battle of Lahti. |
| Second Kingdom of Finland | 1918 | Helsinki | Finland | A failed attempt at establishing a Finnish monarchy after the Finnish Declaration of Independence from Russia. |
| Bunjevac People's Republic | 1918 | Sombor | Serbia | Proclaimed at Sombor in alliance with the Banat Republic to represent the interests of the Catholic Bunjevci. |
| Baku Commune | 1918 | Baku | Azerbaijan | Two communist regimes that ruled, in rapid succession, in the city of Baku. The Dictatorship replaced the Baku Commune in a bloodless coup, but was soon crushed by a joint Ottoman-Azerbaijani army. |
| Centrocaspian Dictatorship | 1918 | Baku | Azerbaijan | Two communist regimes that ruled, in rapid succession, in the city of Baku. The Dictatorship replaced the Baku Commune in a bloodless coup, but was soon crushed by a joint Ottoman-Azerbaijani army. |
| Provisional Workers' and Peasants' Government of Ukraine | 1918–1919 | Kharkiv | Ukraine | A provisional Soviet administration created to govern Soviet-occupied areas in Ukraine. |
| Lithuanian Soviet Socialist Republic | 1918–1919 | Vilnius | Lithuania | A Soviet puppet state created after the Soviet westward offensive of 1918–1919. The Republic soon merged with another Soviet puppet state, the Socialist Soviet Republic of Byelorussia, to form the Socialist Soviet Republic of Lithuania and Belorussia. |
| General Command of the Armed Forces of South Russia | 1918–1919 | Novorossiysk | Russia | The administration of the lands controlled by the White movement's Volunteer Army and the Armed Forces of South Russia in 1918 to 1919. |
| North Caucasian Soviet Republic | 1918–1919 | Yekaterinodar; Pyatigorsk | Russia | The product of the merger of the three soviet republics of the North Caucasus, the Kuban–Black Sea Soviet Republic, the Stavropol Soviet Republic and the Terek Soviet Republic, in an effort to consolidate Communist influence in the region. After the capture of Yekaterinodar by the Volunteer Army, the White Movement began an assault on the territories of the Republic. In 1919, the All-Russian Central Executive Committee abolished the republic. |
| Republic of Tarnobrzeg | 1918–1919 | Tarnobrzeg | Poland | In the chaos of the dissolution of Austria-Hungary, the inhabitants of the city of Tarnobrzeg in the Kingdom of Galicia and Lodomeria, led by socialist politician and priest Eugeniusz Okoń and lawyer Tomasz Dąbal, declared their city independent with the aim of creating a Polish Soviet-style city-state. It ended with the arrest of Okoń and Dąbal. |
| Komancza Republic | 1918–1919 | Komancza | Poland; Slovakia; Ukraine | A microstate consisting of 30 Lemko villages in Galicia. The Republic wished to unite with the West Ukrainian People's Republic, but the Treaty of Saint-Germain seceded all of Galicia west of the San to Poland. |
| (Ukraine) West Ukrainian People's Republic | 1918–1919 | Lviv; Ternopil; Stanislaviv; Zalishchyky | Ukraine | A breakaway state that emerged in the midst of the dissolution of Austria-Hungary. The People's Republic was a nominally autonomous part of the Ukrainian People's Republic (UPR), but broke away when the UPR decided to trade the territory to Poland for an alliance against Soviet Russia. Shortly after, the government was exiled, where it lasted until 1923. |
| Regional Government of Northwest Russia | 1918–1919 | Reval | Estonia | A provisional government formed in Estonia by anti-Bolsheviks and some of the Allied forces. It was the main force in combatting the growing Bolshevik influence in the region. After the disastrous Battle of Petrograd both the Northwestern Army and the Government dissolved. |
| Commune of the Working People of Estonia | 1918–1919 | Narva | Estonia | A communist government that administered the Bolshevik-occupied areas of Estonia during the Estonian War of Independence. |
| Republic of German-Austria | 1918–1919 | Vienna | Austria & Czech Republic | An initial rump state in the German-speaking, predominantly ethnically German areas of Austria-Hungary. The Republic claimed to administer sizable portions of what is now the Czech Republic, including the Sudetenland, and parts of Italy, Slovakia, Hungary and Poland, but de facto governed the Alpine and Danubian areas. The Treaty of Saint-Germain-en-Laye reduced Austria back to its modern territory, and the First Austrian Republic was founded in 1920. |
| Provisional National Government of the Southwestern Caucasus | 1918–1919 | Kars | Turkey | A pro-Turkish provisional government established in the aftermath of the Armistice of Mudros to stop the area being incorporated into the First Republic of Armenia. |
| Republic of Aras | 1918–1919 | Nakhchivan | Azerbaijan | The creation of the Republic of Aras was in response to a border proposal by the British that would have assigned the area to the First Republic of Armenia. Its existence was ended when troops from Armenia gained control of the region in mid-June 1919 during the Aras War. However, this triggered an advance into the Nakhchivan region by the Azeri and Ottoman armies, and by the end of July, Armenia had lost control of the region. |
| Provisional Military Dictatorship of Mughan | 1918–1919 | Goytepe | Azerbaijan | A British-controlled anti-communist state founded in the Lankaran region of present-day Azerbaijan on 4 August 1918, amid the Mughan clashes. The Dictatorship pledged itself to a united Russian state led by Anton Denikin. A workers' revolt organised by Bolshevik sympathisers overthrew the state and formed the Mughan Soviet Republic. |
| (Belarus) Belarusian People's Republic | 1918–1919 | Minsk, Vilnius & Grodno | Belarus; Lithuania | A German puppet state in modern-day Belarus and Lithuania. The Republic, after the Germans were defeated, was swiftly carved up by Poland and the Soviet Union. |
| People's State of Bavaria | 1918–1919 | Munich | Germany | A socialist republic in Bavaria which existed from November 1918 to April 1919. It was established during the German revolution as an attempt at a socialist state to replace the Kingdom of Bavaria, which had been a constituent state of the German Empire. |
| Free Socialist Republic of Germany | 1918–1919 | Berlin | Germany | The German revolution of 1918–1919, also known as the November Revolution (German: Novemberrevolution), was an uprising started by workers, sailors and soldiers in the final days of World War I. It quickly and almost bloodlessly brought down the German Empire. In its more violent second stage, the supporters of a parliamentary republic were victorious over those who wanted a Soviet-style council republic. The defeat of the forces of the far left cleared the way for the establishment of the Weimar Republic. The key factors leading to the revolution were the extreme burdens suffered by the German people during the war, the economic and psychological impacts of the Empire's defeat, and social tensions between the general populace and the aristocratic and bourgeois elite. |
| Bavarian Soviet Republic | 1918–1919 | Munich | Germany | An unrecognised socialist state in Bavaria during the German revolution of 1918–1919. |
| Bremen Soviet Republic | 1918–1919 | Bremen | Germany | An unrecognised revolutionary state in Germany formed during the German revolution of 1918–1919 in the immediate aftermath of the First World War. Although not formally declared until 10 January 1919, the regime it represented presided in the industrial port city of Bremen from 14 November 1918 until its suppression on 4 February 1919 by army and irregular forces engaged by the provisional government in Berlin. |
| Saxon Soviet Republic | 1918–1919 | Dresden | Germany | Saxony in the German Revolution followed a path that went from early control by workers' and soldiers' councils to the adoption of a republican constitution in a series of events that roughly mirrored those at the national level in Berlin. Because some members of the revolutionary councils, which were set up in major cities such as Dresden, Leipzig and Chemnitz, wanted a soviet-style council government while others favored a parliamentary republic, there was considerable internal disagreement that caused a split between the two groups. |
| Würzburg Soviet Republic | 1918–1919 | Würzburg | Germany | An unrecognized state organized under council communism in Würzburg, Germany in April 1919. It had little support among the local citizenry or political parties and was quickly put down by a unit of the Bavarian Army. |
| Latvian Socialist Soviet Republic | 1918–1920 | Riga & Daugavpils | Latvia | A socialist republic formed during the Latvian War of Independence. It was proclaimed on 17 December 1918 with the political, economic, and military backing of Vladimir Lenin and his Bolshevik government in the RSFSR. The head of government was Pēteris Stučka, with Jūlijs Daniševskis as his deputy. |
| Rudabel Republic | 1918–1920 | Rudabelka | Belarus | A Bolshevik state established in Rudabelka. |
| Republic of Batumi | 1918–1920 | Batumi | Georgia | A British puppet state during the Russian Civil War led by James Cooke-Collis. |
| Don Republic | 1918–1920 | Novocherkassk | Russia | Succeeded by the Rostov Oblast. |
| Kuban People's Republic | 1918–1920 | Krasnodar | Russia | Succeeded by the Krasnodar Krai. |
| Provisional Government of the Northern Region | 1918–1920 | Arkhangelsk | Russia | A krai of the Russian State founded from the merger of the Supreme Administration of the Northern Region and the Murmansk Krai. The government was founded with the military and political support of the Allies. After the end of the Allied intervention, Soviet troops entered the main cities of the government. |
| Karabakh Council | 1918–1920 | Shushi (1918-1918); Shosh (1919–1920) | Azerbaijan | An ethnic Armenian state in Nagorno-Karabakh. It was established by the local inhabitants after the signing of the Treaty of Batum and lasted until the Red Army invasion of Azerbaijan, where the Red Army penetrated and captured the mountainous areas the Azeris could not hold. |
| Azerbaijan Democratic Republic | 1918–1920 | Baku | Azerbaijan | Succeeded by the Azerbaijani Soviet Socialist Republic. |
| First Republic of Armenia | 1918–1920 | Yerevan | Armenia | Succeeded by the Armenian Soviet Socialist Republic. |
| Lemko Republic | 1918–1920 | Florynka | Poland | Annexed by the Second Polish Republic. |
| Democratic Republic of Georgia | 1918–1921 | Tbilisi | Georgia | Succeeded by the Georgian Soviet Socialist Republic. |
| Republic of Perloja | 1918–1923 | Perloja | Lithuania | In the chaos after World War I, locals established a self-governing parish committee, often called the Republic of Perloja. It had its own court, police, prison, currency (the Perlojan litas), and an army of 300 men. |
| Crimean Socialist Soviet Republic | 1919 | Simferopol | Ukraine (de jure) Russia (de facto) | A socialist state that existed in Crimea for several months in 1919 during the Russian Civil War. Its capital was Simferopol. |
| Limerick Soviet | 1919 | Limerick | Ireland | One of the many soviets declared in Ireland from 1919 to 1923. At the beginning of the Irish War of Independence, the Limerick Trades and Labour Council organised a general strike in protest of the British Army declaration of a Special Military Area and the restriction of people and goods in and out of the city. The governing committee of the strike soon styled itself as a soviet and began multiple operations, including boycotting British soldiers, printing their own money, and controlling food prices. After two weeks, the Lord Mayor of Limerick Phons O'Mara called for an end to the strike, and the committee issued a notice proclaiming the strike was over. |
| (Ukraine) Hutsul Republic | 1919 | Yasinia | Ukraine | An ethnic Hutsul state in western Ukraine. The republic wished to join the West Ukrainian People's Republic but was quickly annexed by Hungary. |
| Hryhorivshchyna | 1919 | Oleksandriia | Ukraine | A Green army revolt by Nykyfor Hryhoriv, considered the largest threat to communism in Ukraine. |
| Chyhyryn Soviet Republic | 1919 | Chyhyryn | Ukraine | A Soviet-allied state founded when Cossack Ataman Svyryd Kotsur occupied the city of Chyhyryn in central Ukraine and started brutal reprisals against bourgeois and government officials, confiscating money and property for his detachment. Soon, villagers in villages occupied by the Ataman's forces rebelled and the Republic was absorbed into the Ukrainian Soviet Socialist Republic. |
| Lithuanian–Byelorussian Soviet Socialist Republic | 1919 | Vilnius; Minsk | Lithuania & Belarus | A union of two Soviet puppet states, the Lithuanian Soviet Socialist Republic and the Socialist Soviet Republic of Byelorussia, that existed during the Lithuanian–Soviet War and the Polish–Soviet War until all the territory the Republic claimed to administer was overrun by the Polish and Lithuanian Armies. |
| Hungarian Soviet Republic | 1919 | Budapest | Hungary | A communist state that overthrew the new Hungarian Republic. Although the Republic claimed to rule all of Hungary, it only exercised power over 23% of Hungary's historical territory and the communist government could not reach a deal with the Triple Entente to lift its economic blockade. The regime lasted until Romanian troops entered Budapest in early August. |
| Slovak Soviet Republic | 1919 | Prešov | Slovakia | A puppet state of Communist Hungary. In mid-1919 Hungary launched an offensive into Czechoslovak territory capturing areas of southern Slovakia and declaring a Soviet republic headed by journalist Antonín Janoušek. The new Republic was extremely reliant on Hungary; when Hungary withdrew, it swiftly collapsed. |
| Kingdom of Portugal | 1919 | Porto | Portugal | A monarchist revolt led by colonial governor Henrique Mitchell de Paiva Cabral Couceiro. In the chaos of the Sidonists riots in Lisbon, Couceiro and his supporters marched on Porto and declared the reinstatement of the monarchy. A lack of public support, coupled with a revolt led by citizens of Porto and members of the National Republican Guard, led to the Kingdom's downfall. |
| Free State of Schwenten | 1919 | Schwenten | Poland | Amidst the Greater Poland uprising, the inhabitants of the mainly ethnically German village of Schwenten invoked the right to self-determination from the American President Woodrow Wilson's Fourteen Points and declared themselves an independent and neutral state. Soon, the residents realised that local Polish military units might use their German ethnicity as an excuse to annex the town, and so the decision was made to disband the microstate and join the Weimar Republic. |
| Republic of Batumi | 1919 | Batumi | Georgia | An attempt at establishing independence for Adjara, a historically Muslim region of Georgia. |
| Provisional Government of White Karelia | 1919 | Uhtua | Russia | A precursor to the Republic of Uhtua. Initially, the state wanted to unite with Finland, but later on there was discussion of becoming an independent country in alliance with the Finns. It soon expanded and evolved into the Republic of Uhtua. |
| Steppe-Badzheyskaya Republic | 1919 | Stepnoy Badzhey | Russia | Established by anti-White insurgents in Yenisei Governorate during the Russian Civil War. |
| Kodun State | 1919 | Soorkhe | Russia | A theocratic state in Buryatia. |
| Republic of Prekmurje | 1919 | Murska Sobota | Slovenia | After the declaration of a communist republic in Hungary, the ethnically Slovene area of the Prekmurje decided to secede from Hungary on the basis of the communist government seizing and confiscating ecclesiastical properties in the region. Separatists led by schoolmaster Vilmos Tkálecz declared independence and started conquering villages in the Prekmurje. The Republic met a swift downfall when the Hungarian Red Army marched on the region and murdered all its opponents; after the fall of Hungarian Soviet Republic at the hands of the Romanians, the Yugoslav Army occupied the Prekmurje and annexed it. |
| Mughan Soviet Republic | 1919 | Lankaran | Azerbaijan | A pro-Bolshevik state in southeastern Azerbaijan. |
| Hungarian Republic | 1919–1920 | Budapest | Hungary | After the collapse of the Hungarian Soviet Republic in the Hungarian–Romanian War, counter-revolutionaries sought to return to a pre-communist status quo, until the Paris Peace Conference forced Hungary to retreat behind the demarcation lines and re-establish its monarchy. |
| Italian Regency of Carnaro | 1919–1920 | Fiume | Croatia | A self-proclaimed state in the city of Fiume (now Rijeka) led by Gabriele d'Annunzio between 1919 and 1920. |
| North Caucasian Emirate | 1919–1920 | Vedeno | Russia | A Chechen Islamic state in the regions of Dagestan and Chechnya led by Uzun-Hajji, founded after the capture of the town of Vedeno from General Anton Denikin's Volunteer Army and the declaration of independence under the protection of the Ottoman Empire. However, the Volunteer Army was still active in the region and the Emirate became reliant on Bolshevik aid until Uzun-Hajji's death, when the state was absorbed into the newly founded Mountain Autonomous Soviet Socialist Republic. |
| South Russia | 1919–1920 | Ekaterinodar (January 1919–March 1920); Novorossiysk (March 1920); Sevastopol (from April 1920) | Russia | A military quasi-state that succeeded the General Command of the Armed Forces of South Russia as the administration ruling the territories conquered by the Armed Forces of South Russia under General Anton Denikin. |
| Republic of North Ingria | 1919–1920 | Kirjasalo | Russia | A state of Ingrian Finns in the southern part of the Karelian Isthmus, which seceded from Bolshevist Russia after the October Revolution. Its aim was to be incorporated into Finland. It ruled parts of Ingria from 1919 until 1920. With the Peace Treaty of Tartu, it was re-integrated into Russia. It lasted from January 23, 1919 to December 5, 1920. |
| Republic of Uhtua | 1919–1920 | Uhtua | Russia | The Republic of Uhtua (or the Republic of East Karelia) was an unrecognized state with the focus of a state led by Finns. It existed from 1919 to 1920, created out of five Volosts in the Kemsky uezd of the Arkhangelsk Governorate, now in the Republic of Karelia. The capital of the republic was the village of Uhtua (now Kalevala). |
| Independent Medvyn Republic | 1919–1921 | Medvyn | Ukraine | Established during the Ukrainian War of Independence. |
| Kholodny Yar Republic | 1919–1922 | Melnyky | Ukraine | A self-proclaimed state formed by a partisan movement, occupying part of the former Ukrainian People's Republic (UPR) in the Chyhyryn district of the Kyiv province (modern Cherkasy Oblast), in the area of the Kholodny Yar forest tract. The village of Melnyky was its capital. It had a 15,000-strong army composed of peasants and soldiers from the UPR army, which was defeated by the White Army in Podolia earlier. |
| Mliev Republic | 1919–1922 | Mliev | Ukraine | Established during the Ukrainian War of Independence. |
| (Republic of Ireland) Irish Republic | 1919–1922 | Dublin | Ireland and United Kingdom | An unrecognized Irish nationalist state during the Irish War for Independence, it ceased to exist following the Anglo-Irish Treaty which gave Southern Ireland independence as the Irish Free State while keeping Northern Ireland under British control. These terms caused much of the victorious Irish Republican Army to reject the treaty, leading to the Irish Civil War (1922–1923) between pro-treaty Free State forces and the anti-treaty IRA, who viewed the dissolution of the Republic as illegal. |
| Free State of Bottleneck | 1919–1923 | Lorch | Germany | A quasi-state that existed from 10 January 1919 until 25 February 1923. It was formed from part of the Prussian province of Hesse-Nassau as a consequence of the occupation of the Rhineland following World War I. The Bottleneck is now part of the German states of Hesse and Rhineland-Palatinate. |
| Galician Soviet Socialist Republic | 1920 | Ternopil | Ukraine | A communist state established by the Red Army as a buffer state after a successful counter-offensive during the Polish–Soviet War, lasting until another Polish offensive that captured Ternopil. |
| Cork Harbour Soviet | 1920 | Cork | Ireland | Another Irish soviet established over pay disputes, the Cork Harbour Soviet was founded when the Cork Harbour Board refused to increase the wages of dock workers to 70 shillings a week as recommended by a commission set up by Lord Mayor of Cork Tomás Mac Curtain. Eventually, the Cork Harbour Soviet was disestablished after an agreement was reached regarding an increase in wages. |
| Soviet Government in Waterford | 1920 | Waterford | Ireland | One of the few soviets in Ireland not founded to raise wages, the Waterford Soviet was founded in protest against the detention of Republicans on hunger strikes. |
| Knocklong Soviet | 1920 | Knocklong | Ireland | Another Irish Soviet founded in Cleeves-owned creameries in the village of Knocklong in rural Limerick, which were considered to be one of the lowest paying employers in Ireland. Following a dispute with Cleeves workers belonging to ITGWU, the Knocklong Soviet seized the facilities and started running them independently. The soviet lasted 5 days until the workers forced Cleeves to agree to a wage increase, among other quality-of-life improvements. |
| Olonets Government of Southern Karelia | 1920 | Olonets | Russia | A Karelian Finn state founded by Finland during the Aunus expedition against the Russian Soviet Federative Socialist Republic. However, the Soviet forces soon recaptured their capital of Olonets and the Government was forced into exile. In October 1920, it merged with the Republic of Uhtua to form the Karelian United Government. |
| Boyko Soviet Republic | 1920 | Oporec | Ukraine | An uprising by interned Ukrainian Galician Army soldiers in Czechoslovakia organised by the Communist Party of Eastern Galicia. The rebelling soldiers crossed the Ukrainian border and captured a few towns along it, proclaiming the Boyko Soviet Republic. The republic ended its brief existence with the withdrawal of the supporting Red Army; the revolutionaries crossed the Czechoslovak border and were promptly arrested. |
| Koidanovskaya Independent Republic | 1920 | Dzyarzhynsk | Belarus | During the Polish–Soviet War, a neutral zone was formed in between the front lines. In the zone was the city of Koydanava, where local residents from around the city created partisan groups to defend against the Red Army. The rebels, led by Belarusian nationalist Pavel Kolechits, recaptured the city from the Bolsheviks, proclaiming a republic, and resisted the onslaught of communist forces for four days before retreating into the countryside where they resisted the Soviets for many more years. |
| Križ Republic | 1920 | Križ | Croatia | A project of the Croatian People's Peasant Party, it was spearheaded by Filip Lakuš and Stjepan Uroić, with plans to make Stjepan Radić its eventual head of state. |
| (Russia) Republic of the Tambov Partisan Region | 1920–1921 | Tambov | Russia | At the zenith of the Tambov Rebellion, the largest of the many peasant revolts during the Russian Civil War against the Bolsheviks, peasant rebels formed a provisional democratic republic. The Tambov Rebellion was one of the most successful rebellions against Communist rule, but after the defeat of Pyotr Wrangel, the Red Army was able to redirect more troops to quell the uprising and the republic. |
| Republic of Central Lithuania | 1920–1922 | Vilnius | Lithuania and Belarus | A puppet republic of Poland that existed from 1920 to 1922 without international recognition. It was founded on 12 October 1920 after Żeligowski's Mutiny, a false flag operation by soldiers of the Polish Army, mainly the 1st Lithuanian–Belarusian Infantry Division under general Lucjan Żeligowski. The soldiers seized the entire Vilnius Region of Lithuania with the view that the Polish government that the region was more ethnically Polish than Lithuanian. The republic was incorporated into Poland in April 1922 and only returned to Lithuania after the Soviet invasion of Poland in 1939, where the Soviet Union gave the region back to Lithuania in accordance with the Soviet–Lithuanian Mutual Assistance Treaty. |
| Karelian United Government | 1920–1923 | Kalevala | Russia | A merger of the Republic of Uhtua and the Olonets Government of Southern Karelia under the pressure of the Finnish government, in order to combat the Soviet onslaught that had forced the rebels back to the Finnish border. After the merger, the combined forces of the two governments supported by Finnish troops recaptured East Karelia. However, the government was forced again back to the Finnish border where the Treaty of Tartu finally dissolved it in 1923. |
| Karelian Labor Commune | 1920–1923 | Petrozavodsk | Russia | A Bolshevik counter to the Karelian United Government. |
| Free State of Fiume | 1920–1924 | Fiume | Croatia | A free state established by the Kingdom of Yugoslavia and the Kingdom of Italy as a compromise, as it was claimed by both states and could have escalated into further conflict. It was split between the two nations by the Treaty of Rome in 1924, with Italy taking the city of Rijeka and the Yugoslavs taking the town of Sušak. |
| Republic of Mirdita | 1921 | Prizren | Albania | A Yugoslav-backed state in the northern Albanian region of Mirdita aimed at destabilizing the Principality of Albania, soon overrun by Albanian troops. |
| Republic of Mountainous Armenia | 1921 | Goris | Armenia | After the defeat of the Armenian Revolutionary Federation in the February Uprising, military commander and Armenian political thinker Garegin Nzhdeh, among others, retreated to the mountainous province of Syunik and declared independence. Soon, the Soviet Union launched a massive assault from the north and east, and the republic collapsed. |
| Lajtabánság | 1921 | Oberwart | Hungary and Austria | An attempt at an ethnic Hungarian state in the eastern Austrian state of Burgenland led by paramilitary commander Pál Prónay, who started a guerrilla war in the countryside. In October, Lajtabánság was declared in Oberwart. The new state printed its own stamps and charged taxes on Austrian and Hungarian trains going through it. The republic ended when the guerrillas left under pressure from the Hungarian government. A referendum was held in the city of Sopron and surrounding areas on whether to join Hungary or Austria; the result was 65% in favour of joining Hungary. |
| Labin Republic | 1921 | Labin | Croatia | A left-wing uprising by miners in the Istrian city of Labin against the authoritarian regime of Benito Mussolini that was, along with the nearby Proština rebellion, considered one of the first anti-fascist revolts. It was brutally crushed by the Italian administration in Istria one month later. |
| (Serbia) Serbian-Hungarian Baranya-Baja Republic | 1921 | Pécs | Hungary & Croatia | After the defeat of the Hungarian Soviet Republic, many communists fled to the area of Baranya in southern Hungary, where the mayor of Pécs gave them refuge. At the Great People's Assembly of Pécs in August 1921, painter Petar Dobrović suggested the formation of a socialist state in Baranya; Dobrović became president of the new republic. However, after the Treaty of Trianon, the region was allocated to Hungary and occupied by the forces of Miklós Horthy. |
| Bruree Soviet | 1921 | Bruree | Ireland | Another Irish soviet founded in Cleeves-owned bakeries in Bruree over pay disputes. |
| Southern Ireland | 1921 | Dublin | Ireland | A devolved state created by the Government of Ireland Act 1920. It incorporated all of the Counties of Ireland bar the six that nowadays make up Northern Ireland. With a Sinn Féin victory in the 1921 Southern Ireland general election and the Irish War of Independence, the Sinn Féin-led Provisional Government negotiated the Anglo-Irish Treaty with the United Kingdom of Great Britain and Ireland, and the Irish Free State was established. |
| Rhenish Republic | 1923 | Aachen | Germany | A separatist state declared by a coalition of French and Belgian troops and Rhineland separatists calling themselves the "Rhineland Protection Force" captured the Aachen Town Hall and declared themselves an independent republic under the suzerainty of France. Under the Republic's rule, the Rhineland was a chaotic and unsafe area. The state soon dissolved due to infighting between the members of the cabinet. |
| Autonomous Palatinate | 1924 | Speyer | Germany | A Palatine separatist state founded around the same time as separatist fervour in the Rhineland by Franz Josef Heinz. The state was brought down by the Bavarian anti-separatist Viking League, who assassinated Heinz and perpetrated multiple massacres against his supporters. |
| Albanian Republic | 1925–1928 | Tirana | Albania | The Albanian Republic was the official regime of Albania as enshrined in the Constitution of 1925. Albania came under the influence of the Kingdom of Italy after signing the Treaties of Tirana, which gave Italy a monopoly on shipping and trade concessions. The Republic ended when President Ahmed Zogu convinced the Parliament of Albania to proclaim him Zog I. |
| Republic of Galicia | 1931 | Santiago de Compostela | Spain | A Galician state that existed for only a few hours from 27 June 1931, a day ahead of the election to the Second Spanish Republic's Constitutional Assembly, to 28 June 1931. It was proclaimed by Galician nationalists and striking railway workers who had just lost their jobs after the Council of Ministers decided to end construction of a railway between Zamora and A Coruña. |
| Second Catalan Republic | 1931 | Barcelona | Spain | Proclaimed in 1931 by Francesc Macià as the "Catalan Republic within the Iberian Federation", in the context of the proclamation of the Second Spanish Republic. It was proclaimed on 14 April 1931, and superseded three days later, on 17 April, by the Generalitat de Catalunya, the Catalan institution of self-government within the Spanish Republic. |
| Alt Llobregat Republic | 1932 | ? | Spain | A revolutionary general strike which took place in Central Catalonia, in the northeast of Spain, in January 1932. Initially organised as a wildcat strike by miners in Fígols protesting against low wages and poor working conditions, it soon turned into a general revolt and spread throughout the region. Workers seized local institutions, disarmed the police, and proclaimed libertarian communism, all without any killing taking place. Within a week, the rebellion was suppressed by the Spanish Army. |
| Asturian Socialist Republic | 1934 | Oviedo | Spain | Revolutionaries took over Asturias by force, killing many of the province's police and religious leaders. Armed with dynamite, rifles, and machine guns, they destroyed religious buildings, such as churches and convents. The rebels declared a Proletarian Revolution and instituted a local government in the territory. |
| Catalan State | 1934 | Barcelona | Spain | A state that existed in Catalonia from 6 to 7 October 1934 during the Events of 6 October. The Catalan State was proclaimed by Lluís Companys, the left-wing President of the Generalitat of Catalonia, as a state "within the Spanish Federal Republic" in response to members of the right-wing CEDA party being included in the government of Second Spanish Republic. The Catalan State was immediately suppressed by the Spanish Army led by General Domènec Batet; Companys surrendered the next day. |
| Federal State of Austria | 1934–1938 | Vienna | Austria | An Austrofascist state after the May Constitution. The state was a dictatorship heavily influenced by Political Catholicism and Italian fascism, to the vexation of Hitler, who wished to annex the state as part of his ideology of Pan-Germanism. Hitler did eventually annex Austria during the Anschluss, where a sham plebiscite allowed him to annex the nation as the Austrian State. |
| Popular Executive Committee of Valencia | 1936–1937 | Valencia | Spain | A Revolutionary autonomous entity created on July 22 to confront the Spanish coup of July 1936 which started the Spanish Civil War. It was made up of the political forces of the Popular Front and the trade union forces of the National Confederation of Labor and General Union of Workers (UGT). Based in Valencia, it covered most of Valencia Province and part of Castellón and Alicante. |
| Madrid Defense Council | 1936–1937 | Madrid | Spain | A governing body that ran Madrid, Spain, for about six months during the Spanish Civil War (1936–39). It was formed in November 1936 after the Spanish Republican government fled to Valencia when General Francisco Franco's forces advanced on Madrid. |
| Málaga Committee of Public Safety | 1936–1937 | Málaga | Spain | A Revolutionary organization that emerged after the coup d'état that gave way to the Spanish Civil War between the Nationalists and the Republicans. This entity was in charge of managing all political and social affairs until the city fell to the nationalist forces. |
| Regional Defence Council of Aragon | 1936–1937 | Fraga (1936); Caspe (1936–1937) | Spain | An administrative entity created by the Confederación Nacional del Trabajo (CNT) in the context of the Spanish Revolution, during the Spanish Civil War. Until its dissolution, the CRDA controlled and administered the eastern half of Aragon. |
| Sovereign Council of Asturias and León | 1936–1937 | Gijón | Spain | An anarchist/socialist polity in Asturias and Cantabria during the Spanish Civil War that governed the area as an autonomous entity, as was common in other Republican-controlled areas. However, unlike most others, after the fall of Santander, the Republicans in the area were left isolated from the rest of their comrades, declaring sovereignty and independence. The enclave, though, was already crumbling under the weight of the Nationalist offensive and fully collapsed with the capture of Gijón. |
| (Basque Country (autonomous community)) Provisional Government of the Basque Country | 1936–1937 | Bilbao | Spain | A provisional government during the Spanish Civil War. |
| Interprovincial Council of Santander, Palencia and Burgos | 1937 | Santander | Spain | A governing body established on 8 February 1937 to coordinate the Republican areas in Cantabria (then officially called the province of Santander), Palencia and Burgos during the Spanish Civil War. |
| Free City of Asch | 1938 | Asch | France | A proclamation by Sudeten Germans to secede from Czechoslovakia prior to the Munich Agreement. |
| Autonomous Land of Slovakia | 1938–1939 | Bratislava | Slovakia | An autonomous republic within the Second Czechoslovak Republic. It existed briefly from 23 November 1938 to 14 March 1939, when it declared independence from Czechoslovakia as the Slovak Republic due to mounting pressure from Nazi Germany. |
| (Czechoslovakia) Second Czechoslovak Republic | 1938–1939 | Prague | Czech Republic & Slovakia | Existed for 169 days, between 30 September 1938 and 15 March 1939. It was composed of Bohemia, Moravia, Silesia and the autonomous regions of Slovakia and Subcarpathian Rus', the latter being renamed Carpathian Ukraine on 30 December 1938. |
| Carpatho-Ukraine | 1939 | Khust | Ukraine | An autonomous region within the Second Czechoslovak Republic, created in December 1938 and renamed from Subcarpathian Rus', whose full administrative and political autonomy had been confirmed med by constitutional law of 22 November 1938. Carpatho-Ukraine declared independence on 15 March 1939, but was quickly invaded by Hungary within one day. |
| (Finland) Finnish Democratic Republic | 1939–1940 | Helsinki, Terijoki | Finland | A puppet government of the Soviet Union in occupied Finnish territory from December 1939 to March 1940. |
| (Romania) National Legionary State | 1940–1941 | Bucharest | Romania | A totalitarian fascist regime which governed Romania for five months, from 14 September 1940 until its official dissolution on 14 February 1941. The regime was led by General Ion Antonescu in partnership with the Iron Guard, the Romanian fascist, ultra-nationalist, anti-communist and anti-Semitic organization. |
| Vichy France | 1940–1944 | Vichy | France | A rump state under the control of the Third Reich founded after the Armistice of 22 June 1940. The state under Philippe Pétain was deeply unpopular with the French population and collapsed after the Germans withdrew and the government fled to the Sigmaringen enclave. |
| (Ukraine) Ukrainian National Government | 1941 | Lviv | Ukraine | The self-proclaimed Ukrainian government during the German invasion of the Soviet Union, declared by the proclamation of the Ukrainian state on 30 June 1941, which also pledged to work with Nazi Germany. |
| Republic of Užice | 1941 | Užice | Serbia | A liberated Yugoslav territory and the first liberated territory in World War II Europe, organized as a military mini-state that existed in the autumn of 1941 in occupied Yugoslavia (more specifically, the western part of the Territory of the Military Commander in Serbia). The Republic was established by the Partisan resistance movement, and its administrative center was in the town of Užice. |
| Lokot Autonomy | 1941–1942 | Lokot | Russia | A Nazi client state founded during Operation Barbarossa as an experiment by the Nazis to see how Russian collaborators, especially the Russian People's Liberation Army of the Bandenbekämpfung, would react to administrating in their proposed Reichskommissariat Moskowien. The nation's short existence was bloody yet brief, with hundreds of Jews shot or otherwise killed. It fell after the failure of Operation Citadel and the Soviet pushback; the area and its inhabitants were evacuated. |
| Principality of the Pindus | 1941–1943 | ? | Greece | An attempt at creating an ethnic Aromanian nation in Axis occupied Greece by Alcibiades Diamandi, the founder and leader of the paramilitary Roman Legion. However, the principality was not supported by the Axis nor the local Aromanian population, and was forced to disband by the Greek resistance. |
| Provisional Popular Revolutionary Government of Chechnya-Ingushetia | 1941–1944 | Galanchozh | Russia | A provisional government established by Chechen ex-communist intellectual Hasan Israilov during the 1940–1944 insurgency in Chechnya. |
| Independent State of Croatia | 1941–1945 | Zagreb | Croatia, Bosnia and Herzegovina | A puppet state of Fascist Italy and Nazi Germany in the northern Balkans. The state was ruled by the Croat-dominated Fascist Ultranationalist Ustaše, that perpetrated a bloody genocide against the Serbs in pursuit of an ethnically homogenous Greater Croatia. It is regarded as one of the most brutal genocides in the 20th century. The state lasted until the surrender of Germany, when state forces tried to flee to Allied-occupied Austria to escape the pursuing Yugoslav Partisans. |
| Italian Corsica | 1942–1943 | France | Ajaccio | The occupation by the Kingdom of Italy of the French island of Corsica during the Second World War, from November 1942 to September 1943. |
| Bihać Republic | 1942–1943 | Bihać | Serbia | A liberated territory that emerged in November 1942 and lasted until January 1943 in Nazi-occupied Yugoslavia. It was established by the Partisan resistance movement following the liberation of Bihać. Bihać became the movement's administrative center, and the first session of the Anti-Fascist Council of the People's Liberation of Yugoslavia (AVNOJ) was held there on 26 November 1942. |
| Kolky Republic | 1943 | Kolky | Ukraine | A small parcel of land centred around the village of Kolky that was liberated by the Ukrainian Insurgent Army from German occupation. It was soon brutally attacked on both sides by Nazi and Soviet forces, resulting in the death of up to 500 villagers. |
| Albanian Kingdom | 1943–1944 | Tirana | Albania | Albania was occupied by Nazi Germany between 1943 and 1944 during World War II. Before the armistice between Italy and the Allied armed forces on 8 September 1943, Albania had been in a de jure personal union with, and was de facto under the control of, the Kingdom of Italy. After the armistice and Italian exit from the Axis, German military forces entered Albania and it came under German occupation, creating the Albanian Kingdom client state. |
| Democratic Federal Yugoslavia | 1943–1945 | Belgrade | Serbia, Kosovo, Croatia, Bosnia and Herzegovina, Slovenia, Montenegro, North Macedonia | A state led by the Yugoslav Partisans in the areas controlled by them during the last two years of World War II. The state was still, officially, a monarchy until the abolishment of the monarchy in November 1945 and the establishment of the Federal People's Republic of Yugoslavia under Josip Broz Tito. |
| (Italy) Italian Social Republic | 1943–1945 | Salò, Verona, and Milan | Italy | A German puppet state under Benito Mussolini, formed in Northern Italy after King Victor Emmanuel III signed an armistice with the Allies and the Fascist regime fell. After the armistice was signed, the Germans invaded Northern Italy in Operation Achse, rescued Mussolini, and installed him as the Duce of a collaborationist regime. Though it was nominally independent, the republic was heavily reliant upon German troops who fully occupied two areas, the OZAV and the OZAK. The republic finally collapsed with the Spring 1945 offensive in Italy, and Mussolini was captured and hanged by Italian Partisans. |
| Second Republic of Pińczów | 1944 | Pińczów | Poland | An entity in Świętokrzyskie Voivodeship liberated by joint Polish Resistance forces (Home Army, People's Army and Peasant Battalions) during a period from July 21 to August 12, 1944. |
| Independent Macedonia | 1944 | Skopje | North Macedonia, Serbia and Kosovo | On 8 September 1944, Internal Macedonian Revolutionary Organization nationalists declared independence. However, the state was left defenceless following the withdrawal of German troops. |
| Free Republic of Vercors | 1944 | Vassieux-en-Vercors | France | On 3 July 1944, Farge and a committee proclaimed the Free Republic of Vercors, the first independent territory in France since the beginning of German occupation in 1940. The Free Republic had its own flag and coat of arms, the French Alpine Chamois. |
| Republic of Alto Monferrato | 1944 | Nizza Monferrato | Italy | A partisan state existing from September to December 2, 1944. The state came to exist following the political union of two Italian resistance movements based in Nizza Monferrato and Costigliole d'Asti of the southern Montferrat region. Its main territory comprised the towns of Moasca, San Marzano Oliveto, Calamandrana, Mombercelli, Bruno, Bergamasco, and Castelnuovo Belbo. |
| Republic of Bobbio | 1944 | Bobbio | Italy | A partisan state centered around the Italian city of Bobbio in Piacenza province. The republic extended for ~90 kilometers from Val Trebbia to the Oltrepò Pavese. |
| Ossola Partisan Republic | 1944 | Ossola | Italy | A partisan republic established in northern Italy on September 10, 1944 and recaptured by Fascists on October 23, 1944. |
| Republic of Alba | 1944 | Alba | Italy | Existed from 10 October to 2 November 1944 in Alba, northern Italy, as a local resistance movement against Italian fascism during World War II. |
| Republic of the Taro Valley | 1944 | Compile | Italy | A partisan republic centered in Compiano aimed against the fascist regime. |
| Political Committee of National Liberation | 1944 | Koryschades | Greece | A Communist-majority state established during the Axis occupation of Greece. |
| Provisional Government of the Republic of Poland | 1944–1945 | Warsaw (de jure); Lublin (de facto) | Poland | Established by the State National Council during the Nazi occupation of the country as a transitionary regime to a new Stalinist Poland, against the wishes of the Polish government-in-exile. |
| Provisional National Government of Hungary | 1944–1945 | Budapest | Hungary | A Nazi puppet government of Hungary which ruled the German-occupied Kingdom of Hungary during World War II in Eastern Europe. |
| Red Republic of Caulonia | 1945 | Caulonia | Italy | A communist state in Southern Italy, founded by then-mayor of the municipality of Caulonia, teacher, and member of the Italian Communist Party Pasquale Cavallaro. The Republic was founded as a result of protests and riots by peasants against the landowners who wished to preserve the privileges granted to them by the Fascist regime. The start of the republic saw priests beaten to death and any landowners who dared to cross the rebels killed. A red flag with a hammer and sickle was flown above the town and Cavallaro declared a "Red Republic". The republic only lasted five days until it was put down by Italian troops, but had a profound impact upon Italian communism as a whole. |
| Greater Hesse | 1945–1946 | Wiesbaden | Germany | The provisional name given to a section of German territory created by the United States military administration in at the end of World War II. It was formed by the Allied Control Council on 19 September 1945. |
| Third Czechoslovak Republic | 1945–1948 | Prague | Czech Republic; Slovakia | A post-World War II state founded as a successor to the First Czechoslovak Republic. However, Stalin called for the Communist Party of Czechoslovakia to seize power from the democratically elected coalition government to stop the nation from falling under Western influence. The coup orchestrated by the Communist Party ended in the establishment of the Czechoslovak Socialist Republic. |
| State of Hanover | 1946 | Hanover | Germany | A state within the British Zone of Allied-occupied Germany. It existed for 92 days in the course of the dissolution of the Free State of Prussia after World War II until the foundation of Lower Saxony in 1946. |
| Faroe Islands | 1946 | Tórshavn | Denmark | The chairman of the Løgting declared independence on 18 September 1946, but this was not recognised either by a majority of the Løgting or the Danish parliament and government. |
| Republic of Rose Island | 1968 | None | Italy | A micronation on a man-made platform in the Adriatic Sea, 11 kilometres (6.8 mi) off the coast of the region of Emilia-Romagna, built by Italian engineer Giorgio Rosa, who made himself its president and declared it an independent state on 1 May 1968. |
| Republic of Sbarre Centrali | 1970–1971 | Reggio Calabria | Italy | During the Years of Lead, backlash following the decision to make Catanzaro the capital of Calabria led to a brief neo-fascist takeover of Reggio Calabria. |
| Autonomous Turkish Cypriot Administration | 1974–1975 | Nicosia | Northern Cyprus | The de facto administration established by the Turkish Cypriots in present-day Northern Cyprus immediately after the Turkish invasion of Cyprus in 1974. |
| Free Republic of Wendland | 1980 | N/A | Germany | A self-declared micronation and protest camp established in Gorleben, West Germany, on 3 May 1980 to protest against the establishment of a nuclear waste dump there. On 4 June 1980, the police moved in and evicted the camp. |
| (Czech Republic) Czechoslovak Federative Republic | 1990 | Prague | Czech Republic & Slovakia | After the Velvet Revolution in late-1989, Czechoslovakia adopted the official name of the "Czech and Slovak Federative Republic" from 23 April 1990 until 31 December 1992, after which the country was peacefully dissolved into the Czech Republic and the Slovak Republic. |
| Pridnestrovian Moldavian Soviet Socialist Republic | 1990–1991 | Tiraspol | Moldova | Created In 1990 by pro-Soviet separatists who hoped to remain within the Soviet Union when it became clear that the MSSR would achieve independence from the USSR and possibly unite with Romania. The PMSSR was never recognised as a Soviet republic by authorities in either Moscow or Chișinău. In 1991, the Pridnestrovian Moldavian Republic succeeded the PMSSR. |
| SAO Krajina | 1990–1991 | Knin | Self-proclaimed Serbian Autonomous Oblast lasted from 17 August 1990 to 19 December 1991. | |
| Polish National-Territorial Region | 1990–1991 | Naujoji Vilnia | Lithuania | A proposal by the Polish minority in Lithuania for the post-Soviet Lithuanian government to grant them autonomy. |
| Dubrovnik Republic | 1990–1992 | Dubrovnik | Croatia | An unrecognized geopolitical entity and a self-proclaimed Serb quasi-state that existed during the Siege of Dubrovnik in the Croatian War of Independence, self-proclaimed by the Yugoslav People's Army on 15 October 1991 in occupied areas of Croatia, after being captured by members of 2nd Corps of the JNA. Its provisional president was Aleksandar Aco Apolonio. |
| SAO Eastern Slavonia, Baranja and Western Syrmia | 1990–1992 | Vukovar | Croatia | A Serb Autonomous Oblast proclaimed on the Serb-Croat Border after the 1991 Croatian independence referendum and the secession of Croatia from Yugoslavia. The Oblast joined with the SAO Western Slavonia and the SAO Krajina to form the Republic of Serbian Krajina. |
| SAO Western Slavonia | 1990–1992 | Pakrac | Croatia | A Serb Autonomous Oblast in the Western Slavonia region of Croatia. The SAO joined with the SAO Eastern Slavonia, Baranja and Western Syrmia and the SAO Krajina on 1992 to form the Republic of Serbian Krajina. |
| SAO Bosanska Krajina | 1990–1992 | Banja Luka | Bosnia and Herzegovina | A self-proclaimed Serbian Autonomous Oblast lasting from 25 April 1991 to 9 January 1992. |
| SAO North-East Bosnia | 1990–1992 | Bijeljina | Bosnia and Herzegovina | A self-proclaimed Serbian Autonomous Oblast lasting from 19 September 1991 to 2 January 1992. |
| SAO Northern Bosnia | 1990–1992 | Doboj | Bosnia and Herzegovina | A self-proclaimed Serbian Autonomous Oblast lasting from 4 November 1991 to 9 January 1992. |
| SAO Romanija | 1990–1992 | Pale | Bosnia and Herzegovina | A self-proclaimed Serbian Autonomous Oblast lasting from September 1991 to 9 January 1992. |
| SAO Herzegovina | 1990–1992 | Trebinje | Bosnia and Herzegovina | A self-proclaimed Serbian Autonomous Oblast lasting from 12 September 1991 to 1992. |
| SAO Ozren-Posavina | 1990–1992 | Orašje | Bosnia and Herzegovina | A self-proclaimed Serbian Autonomous Oblast within today's Bosnia and Herzegovina. |
| SAO Birač | 1990–1992 | ? | Bosnia and Herzegovina | A self-proclaimed Serbian Autonomous Oblast lasting from November 1991 to 9 January 1992. |
| Republic of Belarus | 1991–1994 | Minsk | Belarus | Between 1991 and 1994, the Republic of Belarus had no official constitution separated from the Soviet system, as it largely relied on government structures inherited from the Byelorussian Soviet Socialist Republic. The time period also was one of political tension between former CPB members and reformists, mostly aligned with the Belarusian Popular Front. During the August Coup in 1991, the BSSR's branch of the Soviet Communist Party supported the putsch. However, once the coup failed, Chairman of the Supreme Council Nikolai Dementey (who was also first secretary of the Communist Party of Byelorussia) was forced to resign, leading to the election of Stanislav Shushkevich, a scientist who, while a member of the CPSU, was not directly tied to the Apparats. Alongside this, he was known previously for his criticism of the Soviet government's disregard for the Chernobyl disaster. On August 25, 1991, the BSSR declared independence from the Soviet Union, becoming the Republic of Belarus. The white-red-white flag was re-adopted alongside the Pahonia. The CPB and Soviet Communist Party were banned. In 1994, the Constitution of Belarus was adopted, which brought this period to an end. |
| (Kurdistan Region) Kurdish Republic of Laçin | 1992 | Lachin | Azerbaijan | Declared by Kurds in Azerbaijan during the First Nagorno-Karabakh War. |
| Republic of Crimea | 1992–1995 | ? | Russia (de facto) Ukraine (de jure) | On 26 February 1992, the Crimean parliament changed the state's official name from "Crimean ASSR" to "Republic of Crimea". Then on 5 May, it proclaimed self-government and twice enacted a constitution that the Ukrainian Parliament and government deemed to be inconsistent with Ukraine's constitution. In June 1992, the parties reached a compromise that Crimea would have considerable autonomy but remain part of Ukraine. |
| Serb Republic of Bosnia and Herzegovina | 1992–1995 | Pale | Bosnia and Herzegovina | In March 1992, all of the SAOs were unified into the Serb Republic of Bosnia and Herzegovina, renamed to Republika Srpska on 12 August. |
| Republic of Bosnia and Herzegovina | 1992–1995 | Sarajevo | Bosnia and Herzegovina | The state that officially seceded from the disintegrating Yugoslavia in 1992. It represented the Bosniaks in the Bosnian War, while also attempting to incorporate Serbs and Croats. After the signing of the Washington Agreement, ending the Croat–Bosniak War, the Republic merged with the Croatian Republic of Herzeg-Bosnia to form the Federation of Bosnia and Herzegovina. The Republic was formally abolished with the signing of the Dayton Accords. |
| Croatian Republic of Herzeg-Bosnia | 1992–1996 | Mostar | Bosnia and Herzegovina | A Bosnian Croatian proto-state that fought in the Bosnian War. At the peak of its power, they controlled the entire southern portion of the Bosniak-Croat border, though their territory fluctuated during the war. They were allied to the Republic of Bosnia and Herzegovina until the Croat–Bosniak War from 1992 to 1994, when the Republic was united with the Bosnian polity to form the Federation of Bosnia and Herzegovina. |
| Talysh-Mughan Autonomous Republic | 1993 | Lankaran | Azerbaijan | An autonomous republic declared by Talysh nationalist Colonel Alikram Hummatov during the 1993 Azerbaijani coup d'état against the first and only democratically elected president in post-Soviet Azerbaijan, Abulfaz Elchibey. |
| Autonomous Province of Western Bosnia | 1993–1995 | Velika Kladuša | Bosnia and Herzegovina | On 27 September 1993, Fikret Abdić declared the Autonomous Province of Western Bosnia in Velika Kladuša. The entity operated as a self-governing mini-state with its own Prime Minister and Parliament. |
| (United Nations) Eastern Slavonia, Baranja and Western Syrmia | 1995–1998 | Vukovar | Croatia | A Serb parallel entity in the territory of Croatia along the Danube river. |
| Third Catalan Republic | 2017 | Barcelona | Spain | The 2017 Catalan independence referendum took place on 1 October, followed by the 2017 Catalan general strike on 3 October. On 10 October, a document declaring Catalonia to be an independent republic was signed by the members of Catalonia's pro-independence parliamentary majority. |
| Goyce Zengezur Turkish Republic | 2022 | Azerbaijan | Armenia | The Goyce-Zengezur Turkish Republic was a self-proclaimed state declared in 2022 in Southern Armenia, aiming to establish Turkish governance. |

== Oceania ==
| Name | Date | Capital | Now part of | Description |
|---|---|---|---|---|
| New Ireland | 1804 | Castle Hill | Australia | A revolt led by escaped United Irishmen convicts sent to Australia because of their involvement in the Irish Rebellion of 1798. The rebels' goals were to establish Australia underneath Irish rule, and to capture ships to sail to Ireland to help start another uprising. Initially, rebels led by Phillip Cunningham and William Johnston marched to Constitution Hill to rally their troops to capture the city of Parramatta. At Constitution Hill, Cunningham was elected "King of the Australian Empire" and the surrounding area was declared "New Ireland". The convicts agreed to negotiations with the British forces where British cavalry charged the escapees' camp and Cunningham was arrested. |
| United Tribes of New Zealand | 1835–1840 | Waitangi | New Zealand | Independence declared by British Resident James Busby and northern Māori tribal leaders as an attempt to safeguard British claims against French territorial expansion. Led to a formal treaty (the Treaty of Waitangi) between Māori leaders and the British crown in 1840. |
| Independent Commune of Franceville | 1889–1890 | Port Vila | Vanuatu | An independent commune established by angry colonisers in the newly established Anglo-French Joint Naval Commission over the lack of legal rights due to the Commission being a neutral territory. In August 1889, the citizens of Franceville (now Port Villa) declared independence under an elected mayor/president. The Independent Commune was one of the very first states to practice universal suffrage, though only white males were permitted to hold office. The new administration was soon suppressed and the Joint Naval Commission was replaced by the New Hebrides Condominium. |
| Provisional Government of Hawaii | 1893–1894 | Honolulu | United States | Under the 13-member Committee of Safety’s chairman Henry E. Cooper and former judge Sanford B. Dole, Hawaii’s monarchy was overthrown, with a temporary republic established in place with the aim of ultimately annexing the archipelago to the United States. |
| Republic of Hawaii | 1894–1898 | Honolulu | United States | The Republic of Hawaii was essentially the continuation of the Provisional Government of Hawaii. Led by Dole and Lorrin A. Thurston, it put down a failed monarchial restoration attempt before William McKinley formally annexed the archipelago on August 12, 1898 during the Spanish–American War. |
| Republic of Minerva | 1972 | none | Tonga | An attempted at creating a libertarian society on an artificial island on the submerged Minerva Reefs by the Phoenix Foundation, an organisation founded by American real estate millionaire Michael Oliver aimed at creating a libertarian state through freebooting. This specific attempt began when barges of sand from Australia dumped sand on the reefs to bring them over the tide mark; a flag was raised and the 'Republic of Minerva' declared independence. The neighbouring states found this upstart nation concerning and recognised Tonga's claim to the reefs. Tonga soon sent a military expedition to the island to remove the separatists, and the filibustering expedition collapsed entirely when the 'president', Morris C. "Bud" Davis, was fired by Oliver. |
| Tanna Nation | 1974 | Imafin | Vanuatu | The very first of the secessionist revolts that rocked pre-independence Vanuatu. This uprising started in 1973 when turmoil erupted between the five island chiefs. The French, worried of a conflict, asked Corsican colonist and former soldier Antoine Fornelli to mediate between the chiefs. Fornelli soon gained the chiefs' confidence and acted as a figurehead for the new nation proclaimed by him, the chiefs, and the Forcona Movement anti-Presbyterian organisation founded by followers of the John Frum cargo cult. French colonists living on the island attempted to capture the areas held by the leaders of the revolt, but the Tannese revolted and the nation began to centralise its power in the north of the island around the village of Imafin, which became their capital. However, Anglo-French troops landed on the island in late July 1974, captured Imafin, and deported Fornelli to Australia. |
| (Autonomous Region of Bougainville) Republic of the North Solomons | 1975–1976 | Arawa | Papua New Guinea | A provisional government on Bougainville Island that declared independence from the Australian-administered Territory of Papua and New Guinea just 15 days before the Territory itself gained independence. The name North Solomons was adopted in anticipation of a future merger with the British Solomon Islands, which became independent three years later as the Solomon Islands. Following negotiations with the newly established Papua New Guinea, the rebels agreed to join Papua New Guinea in exchange for heightened autonomy as the Autonomous Region of Bougainville. |
| Tafea Nation | 1980 | Lamlu | Vanuatu | Another secessionist state founded on the island of Tanna and the surrounding islands of Aniwa, Futuna, Erromango and Aneityum, the first letters of all the islands make up the name of the nation. This polity was founded by members of the Customary Kapiel Alliancejust five months before Vanuatu gained independence. The new state was attacked and re-conquered by British forces and reincorporated with the newly independent Vanuatu. |
| Republic of Vemerana | 1980 | Luganville | Vanuatu | Another attempt by the Phoenix Foundation to establish an independent libertarian state, using Nagriamel party leader Jimmy Stevens as a front to establish a country on the island of Espiritu Santo. The uprising started when Nagriamel rebels led by Stevens occupied the Santo International Airport and blockaded it by building barricades and blowing up nearby bridges, declaring the independence of Espiritu Santo as the 'Republic of Vemerana'. The administration of the soon-to-be independent Vanuatu sent requests for troops from Britain and France, but due to French landowners supporting Stevens and the rebels, the French vetoed any suggestion of a military force being sent. It fell upon a small force sent by Papua New Guinea to defeat the rebels; the 'war' was uneventful, with Stevens' followers being armed only with bows and arrows. The uprising ended when one of Stevens' sons was killed while trying to escape. |
| N'Makiaute | 1980 | Norsup | Vanuatu | A small revolt on the northern area of the island Malakula following encouragement from the Nagriamel rebels, being soon put down by French forces. |
| Republic of Rotuma | 1987–1988 | Ituʻtiʻu | Fiji | Shortly after the September 1987 Fijian coup, a Rotuman man named Henry Gibson declared to newspapers the declaration of independence of the island of Rotuma, citing human rights violations by the military-backed regime and the lack of representation of the Rotuman people in Fijian politics. However, a small contingent of soldiers arrested Gibson and his fellow protestors, and the separatists were charged with sedition. |

== See also ==
- List of historical unrecognized states
- List of former sovereign states
- Lists of political entities by century
- Provisional government
