= List of historical unrecognized states =

These lists of historical unrecognized or partially recognized states give an overview of extinct geopolitical entities that wished to be recognized as sovereign states, but did not enjoy worldwide diplomatic recognition. The entries listed here had de facto control over significant claimed territory and were self-governing with a desire for full independence. These formally unrecognized entities emerged and disappeared under a variety of circumstances. In some cases, newly established states were overthrown by coups (e.g., the Republic of Biafra), while others were formed during failed revolutionary movements (e.g., the Mahdist State). Additionally, some entities were created as puppet states during wartime (e.g., Tiso's First Slovak Republic) or existed as provisional governments (e.g., the Provisional Government of Western Thrace). The diverse nature of these political formations reflects the complexity of state formation and dissolution in times of geopolitical uncertainty.

== Criteria for inclusion ==
The criteria for inclusion in this list are similar to those of the list of states with limited recognition. To be included here, a polity must have claimed sovereignty, have not been recognized by any widely accepted state for a significant portion of its de facto existence, developed characteristics of statehood beyond that of a provisional government, existed from 1 AD afterwards, and either:

- had a population and an organized government with a capacity to enter into relations with other states; or
- had de facto control over a territory or a significant portion of the territory of an otherwise-recognized sovereign state

For example, a stateless opposition government (like the Provisional Government of India, Provisional Government of the Republic of Korea, or Jewish National Council) would not count as an unrecognized state because its center of power was not located in the territory that it claimed, nor did it formally govern with laws and regulations. Likewise, an occupational authority established during wartime with purely governmental characteristics (like the Republic of Van, Investigating Committee for Preparatory Work for Independence, or Preparatory Committee for Indonesian Independence) would not count as an unrecognized state due to it only serving the political interests of the occupying power rather than having governing control over land and people. Several contemporary protest camps developed during demonstrations which claimed themselves to be autonomous zones (like the Free Republic of Wendland, Capitol Hill Autonomous Zone, or Orisha Land) were popular acts of social movements rather than ruling territorial regimes.

Other popular movements without formal governmental consolidation such as rebellions and revolts (like the Truku), local councils (like the Västervik Workers' Council), secret societies (like the Heavenly Kingdom of Everlasting Satisfaction), short-lived civil disturbances restricted to non-government buildings (like the Sultanate of Mit Ghamr), or hypothetical states that might not have actually existed (like the Rus' Khaganate) do not technically fit the definition of an unrecognized state, and thus also are not included in this list.

== Africa ==
Name	Date	Capital	Now part of	Notes
Republic of Swellendam	1795	Swellendam	South Africa	A republic declared in revolt against the Dutch East India Company; it lasted 3 months before being re-incorporated into the Cape Colony.
Graaff-Reinet	1795	Graaff-Reinet	South Africa	Formed in rebellion to Dutch East India Company; it took 2 years to be incorporated into the Cape Colony, though this time under British rule.
Islands of Refreshment (Tristan da Cunha)	1811–1816	Reception	United Kingdom	Declared by American whaler Jonathan Lambert and four others, who were the first permanent inhabitants of the modern day Tristan da Cunha islands in the South Atlantic. Lambert declared himself the sovereign of the islands. Annexed in 1816 by the Cape Colony under the United Kingdom to prevent France from obtaining the islands.
Griqualand West	1813	Kimberley	South Africa	Enjoyed de facto independence since the founding of Griquatown in 1813, Griqualand West eventually proclaimed itself a British colony in 1873. It did not gain recognition by Britain nor the neighboring Cape Colony and was annexed in 1880.
Potchefstroom Republic	1830	Potchefstroom	South Africa	A republic that existed only for a couple of months before joining with Winburg Republic. It was effectively a city-state.
Winburg Republic	1836	Winburg	South Africa	Established on land on the Vet and Vaal Rivers donated to the Voortrekkers by Bataung Chief Makwana in 1836 in exchange for protection from neighboring Basotho tribes. Joined in union with the newly established Potchefstroom Republic in 1838 to form the Republic of Winburg-Potchefstroom.
Mississippi-in-Africa	1837–1842	?	Liberia	Founded in the 1830s by the Mississippi Colonization Society of the United States and settled by American free people of color, many of them former slaves. Ultimately absorbed into Liberia in the 1840s.
Republic of Winburg-Potchefstroom	1838	Potchefstroom, Winburg	South Africa	Formed from the union of the Potchefstroom Republic and the Winburg Republic in 1838; the nation lasted until Potchefstroom left the union to join with Pietermaritzburg.
Natalia Republic	1839	Pietermaritzburg	South Africa	Established in 1839 by local Afrikaans-speaking Voortrekkers after the Battle of Blood River. This Boer Republic lasted for four years before being annexed by British troops under George Napier.
Andries-Ohringstad Republic	1845	Ohrigstad	South Africa	A fort was established by a group of Voortrekkers under the leadership of Andries Hendrik Potgieter with the help of a Dutch merchant Gregorius Ohrig. The settlers arrived in 1845 and were decimated by malaria. Forced to abandon the area, the republic was officially abandoned in 1849.
Klip River Republic	1847		South Africa	In 1847, after buying land from the Zulu king Mpande, a number of Boers settled in the area and called it the Republic of Klip River (Afrikaans: Klip Rivier Republiek) with Andries Spies as their commandant. The republic was annexed by the British in the same year.
Liberia	1847–1862	Monrovia	Liberia	A collection of African American settlements in West Africa, sponsored by the American Colonization Society. The purpose of Liberia was to repatriate freed slaves back to Africa from the United States. The US government refused to recognize Liberia's independence until 1862, during the American Civil War.
Utrecht Republic	1854	Utrecht	South Africa	A republic proclaimed by Andreas Theodorus Spies following a land purchase from the King of the Zulu, Mpande. It joined with the Lydenburg Republic in 1858.
Republic of Maryland	1854–1857	Harper	Liberia	An African American settlement in West Africa, whose independence was unrecognized by the United States. It joined the also unrecognized Liberia in 1857 in reaction to a native insurgency.
Lydenburg Republic	1856	Lydenburg	South Africa	A Boer republic which was created following the dissolution of the Andries-Ohringstad Republic. Eventually this nation expanded with the inclusion of the Utrecht Republic in 1858. The republic lasted until 1860 when it was incorporated into the South African Republic.
Republic of Zoutpansberg	1857	?	South Africa	A small Boer Republic that joined with the South African Republic in 1864. The white settlers in Zoutpansberg had for many years a reputation for lawlessness, and were later regarded as typical "back velt Boers". Zoutpansberg contained a larger native population than any other region of the Transvaal.
Sultanate of Utetera	1860–1887	Kasongo	Democratic Republic of Congo	Founded by infamous slave trader Tippu Tip.
Klipdrift Republic	1870	Barkly West	South Africa	A Republic proclaimed during a dispute over diamond mines near what would become Griqualand West.
Free Republic of Rehoboth	1872–1990	Rehoboth	Namibia	The Baster are a community of mixed race descent, who left the British-ruled Cape Colony in 1868 and settled in a territory on a high plateau between the Namib and Kalahari deserts in what is now central Namibia, where they founded the Free Republic of Rehoboth (Rehoboth Gebiet), in 1872. They adopted a constitution known in Afrikaans as the Vaderlike Wette (Paternal Laws), which still continues to govern the internal affairs of the Baster community into the 21st century. Since the independence of Namibia, in 1990, the new state confiscated all of their territory without compensation.
Griqualand East	1862-1879	Kokstad	South Africa	One of four short-lived Griqua states in Southern Africa from the early 1860s until the late 1870s and was located between the Umzimkulu and Kinira Rivers, south of the Sotho Kingdom.
Republic of Stellaland	1882	Vryburg	South Africa	A Boer republic located in an area of British Bechuanaland (now in South Africa's North West Province), west of the Transvaal. After unification with the neighbouring State of Goshen, it became the United States of Stellaland.
Goshen	1882	Rooigrond, Mafikeng	South Africa	A short-lived Boer republic in southern Africa founded by Boers expanding west from Transvaal who opposed British advance in the region. Located in Tswana territory west of the Transvaal, Goshen existed as an independent nation for a short period; from 1882 to 1883 as the State of Goshen and, after unification with neighbouring Stellaland, as the United States of Stellaland.
United States of Stellaland	1883	Vryburg	South Africa	A Boer republic which created from the union of neighboring Republic of Stellaland and State of Goshen. The republic lasted until it became a protectorate of the South African Republic on 10 September 1884 only to be annexed 6 days later.
Colinsland	1884–1885	?	Guinea	Disputed German colony in modern-day Guinea. The colony was initiated by the German merchant Frederick Colin, with limited support from the German government. Conceded to France (which had already claimed the area) in exchange for minor territories in other parts of Africa, and respect for Colin's commercial rights in the territory.
Republic of Lijdensrust	1884–1887	Grootfontein	Namibia	It was a short-lived Boer republic in the area of present-day Namibia. Declared on 20 October 1885, it was originally named Upingtonia, but its name was changed soon after, as the reason for its original name proved worthless. In 1887, it was merged into German South-West Africa.
Nieuwe Republiek	1884–1888	Vryheid	South Africa	Created on 16 August 1884 with land donated by the Zulus through a treaty. The territory was part of the old Boer Republic of Natalia. The republic enjoyed independence until it was annexed by the South African Republic by its own request.
Mahdist State	1885–1899	Omdurman	Sudan	Islamic state established during the Mahdist War by rebels. The rebellion failed and the state was dissolved.
Klein Vrystaat	1886	Vaalkop Farm	South Africa	A Boer republic which declared its independence from lands formerly controlled by the Swazi king Mswati II. It was eventually incorporated into the South African Republic in 1891 at its own request.
Dervish State	1895–1920	Taleh	Waqooyi Bari	A state in Ciid-Nugaal wherein Diiriye Guure was king and its emir Mohammed Abdullah launched a proto-nationalist polity defending against colonial powers (specifically the United Kingdom, Italy, and Ethiopia) in Nugaal Valley. It was eventually defeated in 1920 by the British and Italians.
South African Republic	1914–1915	Pretoria	South Africa	A provisional government set up in the Maritz rebellion of the First World War. It was an attempt by Boer troops to revive the South African Republic, which had been annexed into the British Empire twelve years prior at the conclusion of the Second Boer War. The mutiny was put down in under six months by the South African government.
Zaian confederation	1914–1921	?	Morocco	A confederation of Berber tribesmen in the interior of Morocco, which resisted French conquest in the Middle Atlas mountains for several years. The confederacy was supported by the Central Powers following the outbreak of the First World War, and was only subdued after the Treaty of Versailles.
Sultanate of Darfur	1915–1916	Kobbei, al-Fashir	Sudan	A protectorate of Anglo-Egyptian Sudan. The Sultan, Ali Dinar, renounced his allegiance to the British Empire in support of the Ottoman Empire, after their entry into the First World War against Britain. The rebellion was put down in the 1916 Anglo-Egyptian Darfur Expedition.
Senussiyya	1915–1917, 1923–1932, 1939–1951	?	Libya and Niger	An Arab religious order that controlled much of Libya and northern Niger throughout the early 20th century. Fought against French colonial expansion in Niger during the Kaocen revolt. Fought against Italian colonization in three stages: the Senussi campaign of the First World War, with support from the Central Powers, especially the Ottoman Empire which previously ruled the area; the Second Italo-Senussi War, also known as the Pacification of Libya, in which brutal war crimes took place; and the North African campaign of the Second World War, specifically the Western Desert campaign.
Tripolitanian Republic	1918–1923	ʽAziziya	Libya	A republic proclaimed following the Paris Peace Conference; it disintegrated sometime in 1923 and was annexed into Italian Tripolitania.
Zefta Republic	1919	Zefta	Egypt	When the British occupation expelled Saad Zaghloul Pasha out of Egypt along with other leaders of the Wafd Party and were exiled to Malta, the people of Zefta, led by Mohamed El Kafrawy Pasha and Youssef El Guindi, gathered and declared their independence from the crown and named it Zefta Republic.
Republic of the Rif	1921–1926	Ajdir	Morocco	An independent Berber republic declared following a rebellion against Spanish rule within the Rif region of northern Morocco. The republic was made up of a confederation of many Berber tribes. Defeated by Spain, with French military assistance, in the protracted Rif War.
Macha Oromo Confederation	1936	Gore	Ethiopia	Rump Oromo state in western Ethiopia that was proclaimed following Italian victory in the Second Italo-Ethiopian War. Requested to be accepted as a British mandate territory to avoid annexation into the Italian Empire, but was recognized by no country and was occupied by the Italian army within the year.
Sultanate of M'Simbati	1959	?	Tanzania	Latham Leslie-Moore, a retired civil servant, declared the secession of the "Sultanate of M'Simbati" from the then colony of Tanganyika. The "secession" was suppressed in 1962 by Tanzanian government troops.
South Kasai	1960-1962	Bakwanga	Democratic Republic of the Congo	An unrecognised secessionist state within the Republic of the Congo (the modern-day Democratic Republic of the Congo) (Note: Not to be confused with the neighbouring state currently known as the Republic of the Congo, formerly the French Congo, with its capital at Brazzaville. The state's name changed to the Democratic Republic of the Congo in August 1964.) which was semi-independent between 1960 and 1962. Initially proposed as only a province, South Kasai sought full autonomy in similar circumstances to the much larger neighbouring state of Katanga, to its south, during the political turmoil arising from the independence of the Belgian Congo known as the Congo Crisis. Unlike Katanga, however, South Kasai did not explicitly declare full independence from the Republic of the Congo or reject Congolese sovereignty
State of Katanga	1960–1963	Lubumbashi	Democratic Republic of the Congo	Declared secession during the Congo Crisis. Controlled the state of the same name within the former Belgian Congo after decolonisation. Although not recognised by any other country, Katanga received considerable financial, military and political support from Belgium, the Central African Federation, and Portugal. Lobbyists on behalf of Katanga also unsuccessfully attempted to bribe the government of Costa Rica in return for diplomatic recognition.
Kel Ahaggar	1962–1977	Hoggar Mountains	Algeria	A Tuareg confederation inhabiting the Hoggar Mountains (Ahaggar mountains) in Algeria. The confederation is believed to have been founded by the Tuareg matriarch Tin Hinan, whose monumental tomb is located at Abalessa. The official establishment is dated to around 1750. It has been largely defunct since 1977, when it was terminated by the Algerian government.
Kingdom of Rwenzururu	1962–1982	Kasese	Uganda	A secessionist movement that began just before decolonisation in Uganda and continued for twenty years. Within colonial Uganda, several kingdoms were allowed to continue their existence as subnational entities with some autonomy. The people of the Rwenzururu region demanded separation from the Tooro Kingdom as their own monarchy, but were denied by the colonial government. The Rwenzururu kingdom declared its independence three months before Uganda's independence. After two decades of conflict, Rwenzururu became an autonomous kingdom within Uganda.
People's Republic of Zanzibar	1964	Zanzibar City	Tanzania	Following the 17 January 1964 coup which deposed the Sultan of Zanzibar, the revolutionary group purporting to represent the island's black majority proclaimed a People's Republic of Zanzibar and Pemba. It immediately made an offer of union with the government of Tanganyika.
Rhodesia	1965–1979	Harare	Zimbabwe	Unilateral Declaration of Independence in November 1965. It did not receive official recognition from any state. It had a trading relationship with apartheid South Africa, which did not formally recognise Rhodesia to preserve its fragile position with other nations and did not apply UN sanctions against the republic. Portugal also maintained informal relations until the Carnation Revolution of 1974. State received full international recognition after signing the Lancaster House Agreement in 1979 and became, on 18 April 1980, the independent Republic of Zimbabwe.
Niger Delta Republic	1966	?	Nigeria	A short lived state declared by Isaac Adaka Boro, a soldier and Niger Delta activist.
Republic of Benin	1967	Benin City	Nigeria	Occupied by Biafra in August, later given independence in September as a puppet state. Retaken by the Nigerian army one day after the declaration of independence.
South Sudan Provisional Government	1967–1969	?	South Sudan	An African insurgency formed mostly from the Anyanya movement during the First Sudanese Civil War, in rebellion against the predominantly Muslim, Arabic-speaking Sudanese government. The separatist movement was rife with political wrangling and ethnic tensions within its own ranks. The SSPG collapsed in 1969 and was reformed into the Nile Provisional Government.
Biafra	1967–1970	Enugu, Umuahia, Owerri, Awka	Nigeria	Majority Igbo state which seceded from post-independence Nigeria due to ethnic divisions, beginning the Nigerian Civil War. Controlled territory in eastern Nigeria, recognized by five states (Gabon, Haiti, Ivory Coast, Tanzania, Zambia).
Maquis of Fizi	1967–1986	Hewa Bora	Democratic Republic of the Congo	A Marxist-Leninist-Maoist partisan republic created by future Congolese president and revolutionary Laurent-Désiré Kabila in the aftermath of the failed Simba Rebellion
Nile Provisional Government (Nile Republic)	1969–1970	Juba	South Sudan	Formed out of the SSPG as an attempt to rebrand the nation from South Sudan to the Nile Republic. Collapsed after one year due to a coup. Following this, most of the separatists agreed to the 1972 Addis Ababa Agreement, in which most of Anyanya agreed to recognize the Sudanese government in return for autonomy, ending the First Sudanese Civil War.
Republic of Martyazo	1972	Vugizo	Burundi	A state declared by Hutu separatists inside the mountainous Vuzigo commune, between the Makamba and Lake Nyanza; lasted for little over a week.
Ciskei	1972–1994	Bhisho	South Africa	Former apartheid Bantustan homelands, formed and recognized only by each other and South Africa.
Cabinda	1975	Cabinda	Angola	Cabinda was a Portuguese protectorate known as the Portuguese Congo. During the Portuguese Colonial War period, the Front for the Liberation of the Enclave of Cabinda (FLEC) fought for the independence of Cabinda from the Portuguese. The independence was proclaimed on 1 August 1975. After the Angolan independence came in effect in November 1975, Cabinda was invaded by forces of the Popular Movement for the Liberation of Angola (MPLA) with support of troops from Cuba.
Transkei	1976–1994	Mthatha	South Africa	Former apartheid Bantustan homelands, formed and recognized only by each other and South Africa. Created the first and lasted the longest out of all the bantustans.
Bophuthatswana	1977–1994	Mmabatho	South Africa	Former apartheid Bantustan homelands, formed and recognized only by each other and South Africa.
Zimbabwe Rhodesia	1979	Harare	Zimbabwe	See Rhodesia
Venda	1979–1994	Thohoyandou	South Africa	Former apartheid Bantustan homelands, formed and recognized only by each other and South Africa.
Emirate of Imbaba	1989–1992	Imbaba	Egypt	In late 1992, the al-Gama'a al-Islamiyya group expanded its influence in parts of Imbaba. In November, the group purportedly announced the establishment of the "Emirate of Imbaba". This challenge to the sovereignty of the Egyptian state triggered the siege of Imbaba, beginning on December 8. In its course, the government deployed over 12,000 police and state Security forces, along with one hundred personnel carriers and bulldozers, all of which put an end to the Emirate.
Provisional Government of Eritrea	1991–1993	?	Eritrea	De facto independent state from 1991 until 1993.
Mohéli	1997–1998	Fomboni	Comoros	Seceded in 1997 but quietly rejoined the next year.
Anjouan	1997, 2008	Mutsamudu	Comoros	Joined with Comoros, then seceded twice to gain independence. Anjouan rejoined Comoros after talks during the first secession. After the second event, the secessionist government was forcefully removed.
Jubaland	1998–2001	Bu'ale	Somalia	Declared independent during the Somali Civil War. Led by General Mohammed Said Hersi Morgan, the former Somali minister of defense and son-in-law of Siad Barre, the previous military dictator of Somalia. Morgan was ousted by the Allied Somali Forces the next year, which allied with the Transitional Federal Government in 2001.
Puntland	1998–2004	Garoowe	Somalia	Declared its own autonomy during the Somali Civil War. It did not seek outright independence, but rather recognition of its status as an autonomous state. Reconciled with the government of Somalia with the signing of the Transitional Federal Charter in 2004. Puntland temporarily operates as a functionally independent state from Somalia in 2024.
Islamic Courts Union	2006	Mogadishu	Somalia	During the summer of 2006, the ICU defeated a warlord alliance backed by the American Central Intelligence Agency and became the first entity to consolidate control over all of Mogadishu since the collapse of the state. The ICU coalesced into a government after taking control of the capital and began reconstituting the Somali state. This period is widely regarded as Somalia's most stable and productive since the civil war began. Six months into their governance, the ICU was toppled during the final days of 2006 by a full scale Ethiopian invasion of Somalia, supported by the United States.
Democratic Republic of Bakassi	2006–2009	Yenagoa, Akwa Obutong	Cameroon	Small secessionist movement led by the Bakassi Movement for Self-Determination (BAMOSD). The movement began during the transfer of the disputed Bakassi territory from Nigeria to Cameroon, with local leaders who were against the transfer declaring independence. By 2009, Cameroon had assumed complete control over Bakassi.
Republic of Toumoujagha	2007	?	Mali and Niger	In 2007, a group allegedly consisting of Tuareg rebels proclaimed the independence of a republic made up of the Tuareg regions of Mali and Niger over the internet. Occurred during the 2007–2009 Tuareg rebellion.
Maakhir	2007–2009	Badhan	Somalia	Short-lived territory on the border between the Puntland state of Somalia, and Somaliland, and was proclaimed as a state independent of both. Quickly subsumed into Puntland.
Republic of Azania	2011–2013	Dhobley, Garbahare	Somalia	Republic which claimed sovereignty over the Somali state of Jubaland. Following the capture of most of Jubaland by the Islamic militant group al-Shaabab, Kenya launched a counteroffensive and aided in setting up the republic from the former Jubaland administration. The action was condemned by Somalia. Azania reformed back into the Jubaland State of Somalia in 2013.
State of Azawad	2012–2013	Timbuktu, Gao	Mali	Self-declared during the 2012 Tuareg rebellion and controlled most of Northern Mali. It was unrecognized by any state. Revoked its declaration in return for a peace deal after most of its territory was taken over by jihadist groups.
Logone	2015–2021	Kaga-Bandoro	Central African Republic	Also known as Dar al-Kuti (French: Dar el-Kouti), was a partially-realized, self-declared autonomous region and proto-state internationally recognised as part of the Central African Republic. It was formed by the Muslim rebel movement Popular Front for the Rebirth of Central African Republic (FPRC) with support of other armed groups on 14 December 2015. On 10 April 2021 Kaga-Bandoro was recaptured by government forces.
Annobón	2025	San Antonio de Palé	Equatorial Guinea	
South West State of Somalia	2026	Baidoa (de facto)	Somalia	On 17 March 2026, the state severed ties with the federal government over issues related to Somalia's ongoing constitutional crisis and allegations by State President Abdiaziz Laftagareen of an attempted coup against him by federal forces. Commercial flights between Mogadishu and Baidoa have been halted, but humanitarian flights continue. Somalian federal forces would recapture Baidoa on March 30, stating that the city "looks like a ghost town" and prompting the regional leader's resignation.

== Americas ==
Name	Date	Capital	Now part of	Notes
Powhatan Confederacy	c.1600–1686	Werowocomoco, Orapakes, Matchut	United States	Native American confederation.
Theocratic Republic of Guairá	1627–1632	?	Brazil	Jesuit missions in western of Paraná.
Republic of Pirates	1706–1718	Nassau	Bahamas and United Kingdom	Loose confederacy run by various pirate ship crews according to an informal pirate code. It was set up following the collapse of English authority in much of the Bahamas. English rule was restored by 1718 with the Acts of Grace.
Watauga Association	1772–1778	Sycamore Shoals	United States	Annexed into the State of North Carolina.
United Colonies	1775-1776	Philadelphia	United States	Before the declaration of independence was a proto-state
United States	1776–1783 (Internationally recognized in 1783)	Philadelphia, Baltimore, Lancaster, York, Princeton	United States	Thirteen British colonies declared themselves independent in 1776 during the American Revolution and united to form the United States of America, which was recognized following the Treaty of Paris of 1783.
Vermont Republic	1777–1791	Westminster, Windsor, Castleton	United States	Admitted to the Union as the State of Vermont, after a compromise ended its jurisdictional disputes with New York.
Wabash Confederacy	1780–1792	?	United States	Native American confederation.
Northwestern Confederacy (United Indian Nations)	1783–1795	?	United States	Native American confederacy in the Great Lakes region. It was formed at the end of the American Revolutionary War with the goal of resisting the westward expansion of the United States. The U.S. claimed all the territory of the confederacy with the Northwest Ordinance. The alliance fell apart after the Northwest Indian War.
State of Franklin	1784–1788	Jonesborough, Greeneville	United States	Began operating as a de facto independent republic after the failed statehood attempt
Rhode Island	1787-1790	Providence	United States	North Carolina and Rhode Island Briefly acted as independent states after they rejected the New constitution
North Carolina	1788-1789	New Bern	United States	North Carolina and Rhode Island Briefly acted as independent states after they rejected the New constitution
Trans-Oconee Republic	1794	?	United States	A short-lived, independent state west of the Oconee River (in the state of Georgia). Established by General Elijah Clarke in May 1794, it was an attempt to head off the new Federal government's ceding of lands claimed by Georgia back to the Creek. In September 1794, state and federal troops forced Clarke and his followers to surrender and leave the settlements.
State of Muskogee	1799–1802	Mikasuke	United States	A Native American state in Spanish Florida; consisted of several tribes of Creeks and Seminoles. Disappeared when the Spaniards captured its founder, William Augustus Bowles and removed him to a prison in Cuba.
Tecumseh's confederacy	1808–1813	Prophetstown	United States	Native American confederacy formed around the leadership of Tecumseh, a Shawnee chief, who resisted American claims to the Northwest territory of the Great Lakes. The alliance fell apart during the War of 1812, after Tecumseh's death in 1813.
Quito Republic	1809–1812	Quito	Ecuador	Anti-Spanish movement in the Real Audiencia of Quito, known in Latin America as the First Cry of Hispanic American Independence.
Republic of South Haiti	1810	Port-au-Prince	Haiti	Haiti declared its independence in 1804 under Jean Jacques Dessalines. That same year, Dessalines declared himself Emperor. After his assassination in 1806, Haiti was divided between the Republic of Haiti in the south and the Kingdom of Haiti, under Henry Christophe, in the north. The situation was further complicated by the secession of South Haiti in the southwest corner of the country under André Rigaud in 1810. His own republic contained the former Maroon enclave of La Grande Anse under Goman, who was allied with King Henry. A few months after Rigaud seized power, he died, and South Haiti rejoined the Republic. In 1820, Henry Christophe committed suicide. Haiti was reunited soon afterwards.
Republic of West Florida	1810	St. Francisville	United States	Republic formed out of an Anglo-American rebellion in Spanish West Florida. Consisted of the part of Louisiana now known as the Florida Parishes. None of these Florida Parishes were in what today is the state of Florida. Against the wishes of most of its leaders, the republic was forced to acquiesce to American authority, and later annexed.
Government Junta of Chile	1811–1812	Santiago	Chile	Established after the deposition and imprisonment of King Ferdinand VII of Spain by Napoleon Bonaparte, the anniversary of its establishment is celebrated as the national day of Chile.
First Republic of Venezuela	1811–1812	Valencia	Venezuela	The very first Spanish American colony to declare independence. The republic was established at the same time as the Napoleonic Wars was reaching a fever pitch and after Napoleon forced the abdication of Charles IV of Spain and his son Ferdinand VII in favour of his brother Joseph Bonaparte, the government of Venezuela decided to secede from Napoleon's Spain when the Supreme Central Junta was dissolved in 1810. However the republic did not last long because certain states of the republic did not recognise its independence and instead followed the Cortes of Cádiz and civil war ensued where the republic capitulated in July 1812.
United Provinces of New Granada	1811–1816	Bogotá	Colombia	Established during la Patria Boba.
Free and Independent State of Cundinamarca	1811–1816	Bogotá	Colombia	Established during la Patria Boba.
American Confederation of Venezuela	1811–1819	Valencia, Caracas, Angostura,	Venezuela	Existed in three different stages as the First, Second, and Third Republic of Venezuela
Republic of East Florida	1812	Amelia Island	United States	Republic declared by mostly American insurgents against Spanish rule in East Florida, with the goal of annexation into the United States. The republic had the support of President James Monroe. A day after declaring independence, the insurgents surrendered their territory to the American army. The American government later disavowed their support of the insurgents and returned all captured land.
Second Republic of Venezuela	1813–1814	Caracas	Venezuela and Guyana	In the aftermath of Simón Bolívar's defeat of Juan Domingo de Monteverde and the Royalists in the Admirable Campaign, Bolívar declared his home country of Venezuela independent. However the republic came to an end when Caracas was reconquered by the Royalists a year after independence.
Free State of Mariquita	1814–1816	Mariquita	Colombia	Established during la Patria Boba.
League of Free Peoples	1815–1820	Montevideo	Uruguay, Argentina, Brazil and Paraguay	Established during the Argentine War of Independence.
Republic of the Floridas	1817	Fernandina Beach	United States	Republic proclaimed by Gregor MacGregor, Scottish soldier and adventurer, after capturing Amelia Island in East Florida. The republic claimed all of West and East Florida, but in reality Amelia Island was the only territory it held. Following the failure of the Spanish to retake the island, it was occupied by the United States navy. The Adams–Onís Treaty of 1819, effective 1821, transferred West and East Florida to the United States.
Pernambuco	1817	Recife	Brazil	The Pernambucan revolt of 1817 occurred in the province of Pernambuco in the Northeastern region of Brazil, and was sparked mainly by the decline of sugar production rates and the influence of the Freemasonry in the region. Other important reasons for the revolt was to establish an independent state.
Third Republic of Venezuela	1817–1819	Caracas, Angostura	Venezuela and Guyana	Merged with the United Provinces of New Granada to form Gran Colombia.
Republic of Texas	1819	Nacogdoches	Mexico	An 1819 attempt to take control of Spanish Texas by filibusters. It was led by James Long and successfully established a small independent government, known as the Republic of Texas (distinct from the later Republic of Texas created by the Texas Revolution). The expedition crumbled later in the year, as Spanish troops drove the invaders out. Long returned to Texas in 1820 and attempted to reestablish his control. In October 1821, Long was defeated by Spanish troops, captured and sent to Mexico City where he was killed by a guard.
Republic of Tucumán	1820	San Miguel de Tucumán	Argentina	Now part of Argentine provinces of Catamarca, Santiago del Estero and Tucumán.
(Entre Ríos Province) Republic of Entre Ríos	1820–1821	Concepción del Uruguay	Argentina	Today the Argentine provinces of Entre Ríos and Corrientes.
Free Province of Guayaquil	1820–1822	Guayaquil	Ecuador	After the success of the October 9 Revolution in the city of Guayaquil, the revolutionaries under José Joaquín de Olmedo declared a provisional government in the liberated areas. In July 1822, Simon Bolívar lead a coup d'état and declared himself 'Supreme Leader' because he viewed Guayaquil as the gateway to liberating Peru and it was soon annexed by Gran Colombia.
Isthmus of Panama	1821	Panama City	Panama	Briefly independent before joining Gran Colombia.
Protectorate of Peru	1821–1822	Lima	Chile and Peru	Had claims outside of Chile and Peru
Republic of Spanish Haiti	1821–1822	Santo Domingo	Dominican Republic	Annexed by the Republic of Haiti.
Confederation of the Equator	1824	Recife?	Brazil	Another attempted independence from Pernambuco, in the Empire of Brazil.
Republic of Madawaska	1827–1842	Edmundston	Canada and United States	Within the provinces of New Brunswick, Quebec and the state of Maine.
Republic of Indian Stream	1832–1835	Pittsburg	United States	Annexed by the United States. Within the state of New Hampshire.
Cabano Government	1835–1840	Belém	Brazil	A popular revolution and pro-separatist movement that occurred in the then province of Grão-Pará, Empire of Brazil.
Riograndense Republic	1836–1845	Piratini	Brazil	The state was proclaimed by the Farroupilha rebels during the Ragamuffin War in 1836. The rebellion eventually failed and republic was dissolved. It is currently the Brazilian state of Rio Grande do Sul.
Republic of Texas	1836–1846	San Antonio de Bexar, San Felipe de Austin, Washington-on-the-Brazos, Harrisburg, Galveston, Velasco, Columbia, Houston, Austin	United States	Declared by Anglo-American settlers in opposition to Hispano-Mexican claims, its annexation by the United States sparked the Mexican–American War
Peruvian Republic	1837	Lima, Arequipa	Peru and Chile	A Chilean puppet state led by Antonio Gutiérrez de la Fuente during the War of the Confederation. The republic was soon dissolved when the Chilean forces were encircled by the Peruvians and forced to sign the Treaty of Paucarpata.
Bahia Republic	1837–1838	Salvador	Brazil	The Sabinada (1837–1838) was a revolt by military officer Francisco Sabino that occurred in Brazil's Bahia province between 6 November 1837 and 16 March 1838. Calling for the abolition of slavery and the redistribution of land, the rebel "Bahia Republic" fought against the government for one year until their capital of Salvador was conquered.
Republic of Canada	1837–1838	Navy Island	Canada	The self-proclaimed government was established on Navy Island in the Niagara River in the latter days of the Upper Canada Rebellion.
Republic of Lower Canada	1837–1838	Napierville	Canada	A government established on the aftermath of Rebellions of 1837 in Lower Canada.
State of Los Altos	1837–1840	Quetzaltenango	Guatemala	The United Provinces of Central America were riven by strife for much of their existence. Guatemala’s ruling class was appalled by the thought of an illiterate and brutish peasant Governor Rafael Carrera, and led the six western provinces into secession. The new state of Los Altos, under Liberal leadership, appealed for recognition to the UPCA. In January 1840, Carrera reconquered Los Altos, and then defeated the UPCA's army in March, sounding the death knell for the United Provinces. Los Altos rebelled again when Carrera declared Guatemala an independent republic in 1847, but was again rapidly crushed.
Juliana Republic	1839	Laguna	Brazil	Today's Santa Catarina.
Republic of the Río Grande	1840	Laredo	United States and Mexico	Consisted of part of southern Texas and the 3 Mexican states of Coahuila, Nuevo León, and Tamaulipas.
Free State of the Isthmus	1840–1841	Panama City	Panama	A failed attempt to separate Panama from Colombia. It was recognized by Costa Rica.
Republic of Yucatán	1841–1843, 1846–1848	Mérida	Mexico	A state from 1841 to 1848, it was proclaimed after the Mexican government tried to centralize and tried to join the US during the Mexican–American War; it was rejected and joined a federal Mexico after the war ended. A revolt in Yucatán in 1916, led by Felipe Cerillo but with active Mayan involvement, effectively separated the region from the weak Mexican state. On 3 April 1916 Carillo declared the independence of the Socialist Republic of Yucatan, but the Republic failed to garner much support, and was quickly overrun by Mexican forces.
Adelsverein	1842–1853	?	United States	A colonial attempt to establish a new German settlement within the borders of Texas.
California Republic	1846	?	United States	Formed during an Anglo-American revolt in Mexican California during the Mexican–American War. This "state" never actually possessed a high level of organization, and was only in existence for a matter of weeks before the rebels deferred to the US government and American troops.
Chan Santa Cruz (Noh Cah Santa Cruz Balam Nah)	1847–1915	Noj Kaaj Santa Cruz Xbáalam Naj	Mexico	Chan Santa Cruz was a Mayan territory in the southeast of what is now the Mexican state of Quintana Roo (within the Republic of Yucatán at the time). The local Mayan people revolted in 1847 following the Republic of Yucatán's second secession from Mexico, driving nearly all whites from the Yucatán peninsula in what became known as the Caste War. After being defeated, some rebel Maya established a stratified religious community in the jungle known as Chan Santa Cruz, which remained a base of operations for rebel Cruzobs for the next fifty years. After decades of campaigning on both sides, the Cruzobs recognized the Mexican government in 1915, though some settlements continued anti-Mexican resistance until the 1930s and 40s.
Great Republic of Rough and Ready	1850	Rough and Ready	United States	A short-lived secessionist state from the United States to avoid mining taxes. It rejoined less than three months later.
Beaver Island	1850–1856	Beaver Island	United States	Mormon theocracy led by James Strang, who was declared king of the Church of Jesus Christ of Latter Day Saints, and whose branch was in opposition to Brigham Young and the Church of Jesus Christ of Latter-day Saints in considering itself to be the sole legitimate successor of the Church of Christ organized by Joseph Smith. This “Strangite” faction controlled Beaver Island of Michigan until Strang was murdered in 1856, whereupon the Strangites were expelled from the area by neighbouring islanders.
State of Buenos Aires	1852–1861	Buenos Aires	Argentina	Resulted from the overthrow of the Argentine Confederation government in the Province of Buenos Aires on 11 September 1852, rejoined the Argentine Confederation after the former's victory at the Battle of Pavón in 1861.
Republic of Baja California	1853–1854	La Paz	Mexico	The filibuster William Walker took control of La Paz, the capital of the sparsely populated Baja California, and 200 more men joined him. Walker declared La Paz the capital of a new Republic of Baja California, with himself as president and a constitution copied from that of Louisiana. Although he never gained control of Sonora, less than three months later, he pronounced Baja California part of the larger Republic of Sonora.
Republic of Sonora	1854	La Paz	Mexico	A lesser to William Walker's Republic of Baja California, it was a merger between that and Sonora.
Provisional Revolutionary Government of Cibao	1857–1861	Santiago de los Caballeros	Dominican Republic	On July 7, 1857, a popular civic-military movement broke out in Santiago with the purpose of overthrowing the government of the conservative president Buenaventura Báez. The Cibaenians declared themselves governed by a provisional revolutionary government, with its seat in the city of Santiago de los Caballeros.
Palmetto Republic	1860–1861	Columbia	United States	Secessionist state established on December 20, 1860, when South Carolina became the first state to secede from the United States. It lasted a month and a half before being a founding member of the Confederate States of America.
United States of New Granada	1860–1861	Bogotá	Colombia	Cauca State seceded from the Granadine Confederation, with Bolivar State following shortly after. They established the United States of New Granada (Magdalena, Santander and Tolima joined later), occupying Bogotá and creating the United States of Colombia.
Kingdom of Araucanía and Patagonia	1860–1862	Perquenco	Argentina and Chile	Set up by a French adventurer who tried to gain legitimacy for his state, only to be denied. The self-proclaimed kingdom was mostly a legal fiction and did only loosely control a small portion of the territory it claimed. In fact the Mapuche warlords that submitted to it were totally autonomous, and used the kingdom only as pretext to obtain foreign support. It was conquered and partitioned by Chile and Argentina.
South Carolina	1861	Columbia	United States	Secessionist state established on December 20, 1860, when South Carolina became the first state to secede from the United States. It lasted a month and a half before being a founding member of the Confederate States of America.
Alabama	1861	Montgomery	United States	Secessionist republic declared January 11, 1861 when Alabama seceded from the United States. It only lasted a month before being a founding member of the Confederate States of America.
Louisiana	1861	Baton Rouge, Opelousas, Shreveport	United States	Secessionist state formed on January 11, 1861, when Louisiana seceded from the United States. It only lasted a month before joining the Confederate States of America on February 8, 1861.
North Carolina	1861	Raleigh	United States	Secessionist government of North Carolina, joined the Confederacy on May 21, 1861.
Tennessee	1861	Nashville	United States	Secessionist government of Tennessee, joined the Confederacy on July 2, 1861.
Mississippi	1861	Jackson	United States	Secessionist state established January 9, 1861 when Mississippi seceded from the United States. It only lasted a month before joining the Confederate States of America.
Virginia	1861	Richmond	United States	Secessionist government of Virginia, joined the Confederacy on May 7, 1861.
Florida	1861	Tallahassee	United States	Secessionist state established January 10, 1861, when Florida seceded from the United States. Only lasted a month before being a founding member of the Confederate States of America.
Texas	1861	Austin	United States	Texas seceded from the United States on February 1, 1861, and lasted as an independent state for a month before joining the Confederate States of America. Not to be confused with the earlier (1836–1845), partially recognized Republic of Texas.
Kingdom of Callaway	1861	Fulton	United States	The Kingdom of Callaway was a county in Missouri that did not agree with the politics of either side in the American Civil War. As a result, it went on its own for a time. What made Callaway unique was that the Union general John B. Henderson signed a peace treaty with the Kingdom in October 1861, thus lending legitimacy to its existence.
Confederate States of America	1861–1865	Montgomery, Richmond, Danville, Greensboro	United States	Originally formed by seven southern states that seceded from the United States, it consisted of South Carolina, Mississippi, Florida, Alabama, Georgia, Texas, and Louisiana. After the beginning of the American Civil War, the states of Virginia, Tennessee, Arkansas, and North Carolina seceded from the Union and joined the Confederacy. Reintegrated back into the United States throughout the Reconstruction Era.
Confederate government of Kentucky	1861–1865	Bowling Green, Frankfort	United States	Kentucky's shadow government formed in opposition to the Union.
Confederate government of Missouri	1861–1865	Neosho	United States	Missouri's shadow government formed in opposition to the Union.
Confederate government of West Virginia	1861–1865	?	United States	West Virginia's shadow government formed in opposition to the Union.
Free State of Jones	1863–1865	Laurel	United States	A Unionist government of Jones County, Mississippi, a state that had seceded and joined the Confederate States of America. A small militia, set up by the inhabitants, made Confederate tax-collecting nearly impossible. The Free State ended after the defeat of the Confederates.
Republic of Manitobah	1867–1869	?	Canada	Within the province of Manitoba.
Republic of Puerto Rico	1868, 1898	Lares	United States	State declared independence on 23 September 1868 during the Lares uprising against Spanish rule in Puerto Rico, following the repeated refusal of Spain to give the island autonomy. The uprising began in September in the town of Lares, where the rebels were defeated by November at the latest. The revolt succeeded in garnering limited political reforms. A group of anti-Spanish rebels also declared independence on 13 August 1898 in the closure of the Puerto Rican campaign during the Spanish–American War but were unable to secure independence.
Provisional Government of Assiniboia	1869–1870	?	Canada	Métis provisional government led by politician Louis Riel in the Red River Rebellion. Demanded self-government rather than direct rule by the Canadian government, following Canada's purchase of Rupert's Land from the Hudson's Bay Company. Negotiated entry into the Confederation of Canada as the province of Manitoba.
Provisional Government of Saskatchewan	1885	Batoche	Canada	A self-declared Métis territory formed during the North-West Rebellion. Led by Métis political leader Louis Riel, who had previously organized the Red River Rebellion in 1869. Defeated by the Canadian army after just over two months of fighting. Riel was later found guilty of high treason and hanged.
Republic of Independent Guyana	1886–1891	Counani	Brazil	Established by French settlers in defiance of both France and Brazil.
Transatlantic Republic of Mato Grosso	1892	Corumbá	Brazil	Modern day Mato Grosso do Sul.
Principality of Trinidad	1893–1895	?	Brazil	American James Harden-Hickey divorced his wife in 1893 (1894?) and announced his intention to move to India and take up a life of Hindu asceticism. On the trip there, a storm forced his ship aground on the island of Trinidad (no relation to the Caribbean Trinidad) in the South Atlantic. Seeing that the island was uninhabited, Harden-Hickey declared himself Prince James I of Trinidad and advertised for settlers in the London Times. The following year, the United Kingdom annexed the island in order to anchor a transatlantic telegraph cable. Prince James was encouraged, hoping that the cable would bring the attention he needed to start his reign. However, the plan was scrapped and Brazil annexed the island again in 1897.
Federal State of Loreto	1896	Iquitos	Peru	An autonomous state of Peru proclaimed during the Loretan Insurrection of 1896 by insurgents wishing for a federalized Peruvian state. It was not supported by many of the inhabitants of the state and was soon put down by a Peruvian expedition.
Manhuassu Republic	1896	Manhuaçu	Brazil	Manhuassu Republic was a republican state proclaimed on May 15, 1896, in the municipality of Manhuassu, which lasted twenty-two days.
Jungle Nation	1899–1900	Moyobamba	Peru	The second attempt to create an independent state in the Department of Loreto created by Colonel Emilio Vizcarra, a Peruvian soldier appointed prefect of the department who grew disillusioned with the national government, and declared himself 'Supreme Leader'. The republic came to an end with Vizcarra's death during his tour of the Loretan cities where, in Moyobamba, he got embroiled in a revolt where he got a rock fatally thrown at his head and died.
Republic of Acre	1899–1903	Porto Acre	Brazil	Declared independence from Bolivia three times between 1899 and 1903 before being ceded to Brazil in the Treaty of Petrópolis. The region had been long settled by Brazilians for decades prior to its triple secession.
Celestial Monarchy	1912–1916	Taquaruçu	Brazil	Messianic state declared by José Maria de Santo Agostinho during heavy anti-government sentiment among local southern Brazilian farmers and workers in response to land confiscation and railroad construction.
Republic of Arauca	1916–1917	Arauca	Colombia	Declared during a rebellion near the border with Venezuela. The republic lasted six weeks, until Colombian authority was restored.
Federation of Central America	1921–1922	Tegucigalpa	Guatemala, El Salvador, and Honduras	Third attempt at a Central American union following the Federal Republic of Central America and the Greater Republic of Central America. However, despite attempts at earning recognition from the United States under both Woodrow Wilson and Warren G. Harding, the eventual coup in Guatemala orchestrated by General José María Orellana led the United States Department of State to predict the federation's coming collapse, which ultimately happened, and so did not formally recognize it.
Republic of Tule	1925	Agligandi	Panama	A short-lived state of the indigenous Guna people, which was declared in reaction to colonial persecution. Developed into the Guna Revolution against Panamanian authority. After just under two months, the Gunas agreed to revoke their declaration of independence in return for civil rights.
Free Territory of Princesa	1930	Princesa Isabel	Brazil	Short-lived state with the goal of rejoining Brazil as its own state, also known as the Republic of Princesa.
Encarnación Commune	1931	Encarnación	Paraguay	An attempted occupation of Encarnación, Paraguay, in February 1931 as part of a larger plan to initiate a social anarcho-libertanian revolution in the country.
Socialist Republic of Chile	1932	Santiago	Chile	Established by the Government Junta in the midst of the Great Depression following the resignation of President Carlos Ibáñez del Campo. Lasted for three months before being dissolved due to unpopular drastic economic measures enforced on the country.
State of Maracaju	1932	Campo Grande	Brazil	Created during the Constitutionalist Revolution, occupying what is today Rio Grande do Sul. An early manifestation of separatism by Cuiabá.
State of São Paulo	1932	São Paulo	Brazil	Rebellion against the presidency of Getúlio Vargas, who eroded the autonomy of the Brazilian states provided by the 1891 Constitution and established a virtual dictatorship through uncontrolled rule-by-decree. Paulistas were not seeking independence from Brazil, but rather reform of the central government in Rio de Janeiro.
Socialist Republic of Brazil	1935	Natal, Recife, Rio de Janeiro	Brazil	The 1935 Brazilian communist uprising was a military revolt in Brazil led by Luís Carlos Prestes and leftist low-rank military against Getúlio Vargas's government on behalf of the National Liberation Alliance (Aliança Nacional Libertadora - ANL). It took place in the cities of Natal, Recife, and the capital Rio de Janeiro between 23 and 27 November 1935. The uprising was supported by the Brazilian Communist Party (PCB), then called the Communist Party of Brazil, and the Communist International. Despite its failure, the communist revolt gave President Getúlio Vargas the pretext for acquiring more power. After November 1935, the National Congress of Brazil approved a series of laws that restricted its own power, while the executive gained almost unlimited powers of repression. This process culminated in the coup of 10 November 1937, which closed the National Congress of Brazil, canceled the upcoming 1938 presidential elections, and installed Getúlio Vargas as a dictator. This period of dictatorship is called the Estado Novo, which lasted until 1945.
State Union of Jeová	1952–1953	Cotaxé	Brazil	From July 1952 to March 1953, a sect of Jehovah's Witnesses proclaimed a messianic utopian community in the wake of peasant unrest in Espírito Santo and Minas Gerais. As a consequence, it was not until 2015 that 40 km^{2} of Ecoporanga were disputed by both states.
Independent Republics	1958–1964	?	Colombia	Several enclaves in rural Colombia which communist peasant guerrillas held during the aftermath of La Violencia. They were overrun by the National Army of Colombia in 1964. Survivors reunited elsewhere and later became part of Bloque Sur, the precursor of FARC.
McDonald Territory	1961–1962	Anderson	United States	An extralegal, unrecognized territory of the United States that comprised all of McDonald County, Missouri and existed for a short time from 1961 to 1962. In 1961, a provisional government chose the name when they attempted to secede the county from the state of Missouri. The government of the territory was never recognized by the State of Missouri nor the United States Congress. Described by the Neosho Daily News as a "publicity stunt", the McDonald Territory's claims to independence were rarely taken seriously by those not involved.
Republic of Anguilla	1967–1969	The Valley	United Kingdom	Created due to opposition to a union with modern St. Kitts and Nevis. It ceased to exist after being occupied by the British Army.
Provisional Government Committee of Rupununi	1969	Lethem	Guyana	Two years after the independence of Guyana from the United Kingdom, the country was shocked by an uprising of cattle ranchers and Rupununi Amerindians in its southwestern region of Upper Takutu-Upper Essequibo, with the insurgents being allegedly supported by Venezuela. Part of the ongoing territorial dispute between both countries.
Republic of Airrecú	1993	?	Nicaragua	Relations between Costa Rica and Nicaragua have traditionally been strained. This situation was not improved when the Costa Rican government granted land rights to settlers along the San Juan River, which forms part of the border between Costa Rica and Nicaragua. A dispute ended with Costa Rica acknowledging that the territory in fact belonged to Nicaragua, and promised to remove the settlers. The settlers, however, refused to leave. In June 1993, they declared their independence as the Republic of Airrecú, which means "friendship" in a local Indian language. The Nicaraguan Army immediately descended upon the area and escorted the Republic into Costa Rica.
Rebel Zapatista Autonomous Municipalities	1994–2023	?	Mexico	De facto autonomous region controlled or partially controlled by neo-Zapatista support bases in the Mexican state of Chiapas since the Zapatista uprising in 1994 and during the wider Chiapas conflict. From 1994 to 2003, the Zapatista territories were structured as regional community centers called Aguascalientes. In 2003, the Aguascalientes were replaced by Centers of Autonomous Resistance and Zapatista Rebellion (CRAREZ), a term coined in 2019, which consisted of Caracoles as community centers, over local formations (until 2023) as the Rebel Zapatista Autonomous Municipalities (MAREZ) governed by Councils of Good Government (Spanish: Juntas de Buen Gobierno). In 2023, after increased cartel violence, the EZLN announced the dissolution of the CRAREZ and its sub-formations, replacing them with hyperlocal Local Autonomous Governments (GAL) within local Zapatista Autonomous Government Collectives (CGAZ) and regional Assemblies of Collectives of Zapatista Autonomous Governments (ACGAZ).
Popular Assembly of the Peoples of Oaxaca	2006	Oaxaca City	Mexico	The Mexican state of Oaxaca was embroiled in a conflict that lasted more than seven months and resulted in at least seventeen deaths and the occupation of the capital city of Oaxaca by the Popular Assembly of the Peoples of Oaxaca (APPO).

== Asia ==
Name	Date	Capital	Now part of	Notes
Kengwei Republic	1776–1839	Monterado	Indonesia	A member of the Chinese diasporic run Heshun Confederation, this kongsi republic, established by Hakka Chinese, accepted Dutch overlordship in 1823, and was eventually absorbed into a stronger kongsi, Dagang.
Santiaogou Republic	1776–1854	Monterado	Indonesia	Also known as the Sanda Futing or as the Hexian Zhengting, it allied itself with the Sultanate of Sambas and later the Dutch East India Company. Ironically, in spite of its alliance with the Dutch, the kongsi republic was ultimately annexed by the Dutch, and its members continued their mining operations until 1857.
Lintian Republic	1823–1854	Budok	Indonesia	Also known as the Xinle Republic, it emerged late compared to most other kongsi republics, and briefly joined the Heshun Confederation in 1850 before being dissolved by the Dutch colonial government.
Republic of Biak-na-Bato	1897	San Miguel	Philippines	The republic of Biak-na-bato was a Filipino revolutionary government declared by Emilio Aguinaldo during the Philippine Revolution.
Revolutionary Government of the Philippines	1898	Bacoor, Malolos	Philippines	Succeeded by the First Philippine Republic.
Republic of Negros	1898–1901	Bacolod	Philippines	Existed under a local constitution in cooperation with US military government from October 2, 1899. until the province of Occidental Negros was established on April 20, 1901, and annexed to the Philippine Islands by the United States as the "Republic of Negros".
First Philippine Republic	1899–1901	Malolos	Philippines	Constitutional republic following the Philippine Declaration of Independence on June 12, 1898 and the ratification of the Malolos Constitution on January 21, 1899, up to the surrender of General Miguel Malvar on April 16, 1902 It pursued a protracted war against the United States shortly after the 1898 cession of the Philippines to the U.S. by Spain.
Republic of Zamboanga	1899–1903	Zamboanga	Philippines	Short-lived Zamboangueño breakaway state.
Tianjin Provisional Government	1900–1902	Tianjin	China	Formed by the Eight-Nation Alliance during the Boxer Rebellion in China, which controlled the major city Tianjin and its surrounding areas from 1900 to 1902.
Great Han Sichuan Military Government	1911–1912	Chengdu	China	Short-lived Sichuanese breakaway state.
Great Mongol State	1911–1919, 1921–1924	Ulaanbaatar	Mongolia	In 1911, the 8th Bogd Gegeen of Outer Mongolia proclaimed independence from the Qing dynasty of China. After 1915 it became a de facto self-governing autonomous region under the suzerainty of the Republic of China. After rebelling against Chinese rule of 1919–1921, it reaffirmed its independence and became the predecessor of the Mongolian People's Republic. Internationally, territories held by this state were widely regarded as part of the Republic of China.
Fengtian	1911–1928	?	China	The faction that supported warlord Zhang Zuolin during China's Warlord Era. It took its name from Fengtian Province, which served as its original base of support. However, the clique quickly came to control all of the Three Northeastern Provinces.
Shanxi	1911–1937	?	China	One of several military factions that split off from the Beiyang Army during China's warlord era.
Sinkiang	1911–1944	?	China	A military clique that ruled Xinjiang during China's warlord era. Unlike other cliques, its leaders were from outside the province.
Tibet	1912–1951	Lhasa	China	In 1913, the 13th Dalai Lama proclaimed independence from the Qing dynasty of China, which was only recognized by the internationally unrecognized Mongolia. However, there have been doubts over the authority of the Tibetan representative to sign the treaty, and thus its validity. The following year, a treaty accepting Chinese suzerainty was signed and the border was adjusted in favor of British India. The 14th Dalai Lama acknowledged Chinese sovereignty in the Seventeen Point Agreement of 1951, but China continues to reject the 1914 treaty and claims South Tibet (now part of India's Arunachal Pradesh). Internationally, territories held by this state were widely regarded as part of China.
Uryankhay Krai	1914–1921	Kyzyl	Russia	A short-lived protectorate of the Russian Empire that was proclaimed on 17 April 1914, created from the Uryankhay Republic which had recently proclaimed its independence from the Qing dynasty of China in the Mongolian Revolution of 1911.
Erzincan Soviet	1916-1921	Erzincan then Yeşilyazı, Ovacık	Turkey	Created by local forces in the Erzincan region of Turkey during WW1 following the Battle of Erzincan.
Basmachi Kokand	1916–1922	Kokand	Kyrgyzstan, Tajikistan and Uzbekistan	The polity of the Basmachi movement centered in the city of Kokand, in the Fergana Valley
Yunnan clique	1916–1927	?	China	One of several mutually hostile cliques that split from the Beiyang Government in the Republic of China's warlord era. It was named for Yunnan Province.
Turkestan	1916–1934	?	Uzbekistan, Kyrgyzstan, Tajikistan and Turkmenistan	An uprising against Imperial Russian and Soviet rule in Central Asia by rebel groups inspired by Islamic beliefs and Pan-Turkism. It has been called "probably the most important movement of opposition to Soviet rule in Central Asia".
Sultanate of Tarim	1916–1945	Tarim	Yemen	A state in Yemen created after a division of power within the Kathiri sultanate in 1916. It was first ruled by Muhsin ibn Ghalib al-Kathiri. Jam'iyat al-Haqq was responsible for civil affairs of Tarim. In exchange for maintaining control of Tarim, the al-Kaf family gave the Kathiri sultanate a monthly stipend
Guizhou	1916–1949	Xingyi, Guiyang	China	A minor warlord faction in the Warlord Era of the Republic of China, situated in the province of Guizhou. Due to its weak economic situation, Guizhou warlords were typically dependent on more economically successful warlords such as the Yunnan clique and the Hunan warlords.
Harbin Soviet of Workers and Soldiers Deputies	1917	Harbin	China	Was a soviet (council) of Russian workers and soldiers in Harbin at the time of the 1917 Russian Revolution. The Harbin Soviet was founded immediately after Czar Nicholas II's abdication. The Harbin Soviet sought to seize control over the Chinese Eastern Railway and to defend Russian citizens in Manchuria.
Alash Autonomy	1917–1920	Semey	Kazakhstan and Kyrgyzstan	An unrecognized Kazakh provisional government, or proto-state, located in Central Asia and was part of the Russian Republic, and then Soviet Russia. The Alash Autonomy was founded in 1917 by Kazakh elites, and disestablished after the Bolsheviks banned the ruling Alash party. The goal of the party was to obtain autonomy within Russia, and to form a national, democratic state. The political entity bordered Russian territories to the north and west, the Turkestan Autonomy to the south, and China to the east.
Iğdır National Republic	1917–1920	Melekli	Turkey	Established as a continuation of the Iğdır Executive Government, which was formed upon the proposal of the Armenians living in the region following the power vacuum created in Iğdır and its surroundings after the Soviet Revolution of October 1917.
Ukrainian national movement on Gray Klyn (1917-1921)	1917–1921	Omsk	Russia and Kazakhstan	Attempt by ethnic Ukrainians living in southern Siberia and northern Kazakhstan at establishing autonomy for Grey Ukraine, where they settled between the mid-18th and early 20th centuries.
State of Buryat-Mongolia	1917–1921	Chita	Russia	A buffer Buryat-Mongolian state during the Russian Civil War. The main government body was Burnatskom, the Buryat National Committee. The state de facto ceased to exist after the formation of the Far Eastern Republic, which divided Buryat-Mongolia in two: 4 aimags became part of the Far Eastern Republic, while the other 4 formed Buryat-Mongol autonomies of RSFSR.
Constitutional Protection Junta	1917–1921	Guangzhou	China	A military government established by the Kuomintang in Guangzhou in opposition to the Beiyang government on 1 September 1917, after the beginning of the Constitutional Protection Movement on 17 July 1917.
Green Ukraine	1917–1922	?	Russia	After the establishment of the Bolshevik Far Eastern Republic on April 6, 1920, Far Eastern areas with an ethnic Ukrainian majority attempted to secede and establish an entity called Green Ukraine. This movement quickly proved abortive.
Yakutia	1918	Yakutsk	Russia	In February 1918 the acting government of Yakutia proclaimed the independence of Yakutia in response to the Bolshevik seizure of power. This independent government was overthrown on July 1.
Provisional Siberian Government	1918	Omsk	Russia	A short-lived government in Siberia created by the White movement in 1918
Siberian Republic	1918	Omsk	Russia	An unrecognized short-living state that existed on the territory of Russia during the Civil War.
Provisional Regional Government of the Urals	1918	Yekaterinburg	Russia	The Provisional Regional Government of the Urals was an anti-Bolshevik provisional government, created in Yekaterinburg on August 13 or 19, 1918, which controlled the Perm Governorate, parts of the Vyatka, Ufa, and Orenburg Governorates. Abolished in October 1918.
Committee of Members of the Constituent Assembly	1918	Samara	Russia	The Committee of Members of the Constituent Assembly was an anti-Bolshevik government that operated in Samara, Russia, during the Russian Civil War of 1917–1922. It formed on June 8, 1918, after the Czechoslovak Legion had occupied the city.
Constitution Protection Region of Southern Fujian	1918–1920	Longxi	China	Anarchist military government.
Russian State	1918–1920	Ufa, Omsk	Russia, Kazakhstan, Turkmenistan, Uzbekistan	Was a White Army anti-Bolshevik state proclaimed by the Act of the Ufa State Conference of September 23, 1918 (the Constitution of the Provisional All-Russian Government), “On the formation of the all-Russian supreme power” in the name of “restoring state unity and independence of Russia” affected by the revolutionary events of 1917, the October Revolution and the signing of the treaty of Brest-Litovsk with Germany.
Transbaikal Cossack Republic	1918–1920	Chita	Russia	Provisional government established by Cossacks in Chita, Zabaykalsky Krai.
Confederated Republic of Altai	1918–1922	Gorno-Altaysk	Russia	Attempt at establishing an independent Altai during the Russian Civil War. The long-term aim of the state was to merge with neighboring Tuva and Khakassia in order to restore the 17th-century Dzungar Khanate, but Turkic-led.
Ferghana Provisional Government	1919–1920	Osh	Kyrgyzstan	A polity of the Basmachi movement led by Madame Bey.
Arab Kingdom of Syria	1919–1920	Damascus	Syria	A short lived constitutional monarchy led by Faisal I of Iraq.
Oltu Council Government	1919–1920	Oltu	Turkey	Established by local Turks and Greeks in response to the British occupation of Kars.
Balagad state	1919–1926	?	Russia	In 1919 the Buryats established a small theocratic Balagad state in Kizhinginsky District of Russia and the Buryat's state fell in 1926. In 1958, the name "Mongol" was removed from the name of the Buryat-Mongol Autonomous Soviet Socialist Republic.
Anhui clique	1920	?	China	A military and political organization, one of several mutually hostile cliques or factions that split from the Beiyang clique in the Republic of China's Warlord Era. It was named after Anhui province because several of its generals–including its founder, Duan Qirui–were born in Anhui.
Provisional Government of the Far East	1920	Vladivostok	Russia	A local government in the eastern part of Russia during the Russian Civil War between January 31, 1920 and October 28, 1920.
Eastern Okraina	1920	Chita	Russia	A local government in the Russian Far East region in 1920 during the Russian Civil War of 1917–1923.
Kingdom of Syria	1920	Damascus	Syria	Lasted for 4 months at the end of World War I until dissolved by the French, who took control.
Azadistan	1920	Tabriz	Iran	A short-lived state in Iranian Azerbaijan that lasted from early 1920 until September of that year. It was established by Mohammad Khiabani, an Iranian patriot, who was a representative to the parliament, and a prominent dissident against Soviet Union and the British colonialism. Khiabani and his followers chose the name "Azadistan" as a gesture of protest against the giving of the name "Azerbaijan" to the government centered on Baku in Transcaucasia which was called Azerbaijan Democratic Republic, and also to serve as a model of freedom and independence for the rest of Iran.
Persian Socialist Soviet Republic	1920–1921	Rasht	Iran	Created by local guerilleros (Jangali) when Red Army troops entered Iran, but failed to spread the revolutionary movement over the whole of Iran.
Independent State of Raqqa	1920–1921	Raqqa	Syria	Created by rebels against the French occupation of Syria.
Far Eastern Soviet Republic	1920–1922	Verkhneudinsk, Chita	Russia	A nominally independent state that existed from April 1920 to November 1922 in the easternmost part of the Russian Far East. Although nominally independent, it largely came under the control of the Russian Soviet Federative Socialist Republic (RSFSR), which envisaged it as a buffer state between the RSFSR and the territories occupied by Japan during the Russian Civil War of 1917–1922.
Khorezm People's Soviet Republic	1920–1924	Khiva	Uzbekistan, Turkmenistan and Kazakhstan	Succeeded the Khanate of Khiva.
Bukharan People's Soviet Republic	1920–1924	Bukhara	Uzbekistan, Turkmenistan and Tajikistan	Succeeded the Emirate of Bukhara.
Zhili	1920–1928	?	China	A military faction that split from the Republic of China's Beiyang Army during the country's Warlord Era. It was named for Zhili Province (modern-day Hebei), which was the clique's base of power.
Autonomous Government of Khorasan	1921	Rasht	Iran	A short-lived military state set up in Iran. It was formally established on the April 2, 1921, and collapsed a few months later, on October 6, 1921.
Kingdom of Kurdistan	1921–1924	Sulaymaniyah	Iraq	Established by Kurdish nationalists following the collapse of Ottoman Turkey, but were defeated by Britain and incorporated into the British Mandate of Mesopotamia.
Tuvan People's Republic	1921–1944	Kyzyl	Russia	Attempt by Tuvans to gain independence following centuries of Chinese rule and years of domination by Imperial Russia; it was put under Soviet control and later formally annexed. Internationally, territories controlled by this state were widely recognized as part of the Republic of China. The Soviet Union and the Mongolian People's Republic were the only countries to recognize its independence.
Mongolian People's Republic	1921–1945, 1953–1992	Ulaanbaatar	Mongolia	Was unrecognized by several countries from 1940 to 1960 due to being claimed as an integral part of the Republic of China.
Tungus Republic	1924–1925	Ayan	Russia	The Tungus Republic was a short-lived state started by the Tunguska uprising as part of the Yakut uprisings of the 1920s. The state was ceded back to the USSR in 1925.
Hailufeng Soviet	1927	Shanwei?	China	The first Chinese Soviet territory, established in November 1927, by Peng Pai with Ye Ting's remnant troops from the Nanchang Uprising. After the Little Long March and the near-rout at the Battle of Shantou these troops were much diminished and were directed by the Comintern to lie low in the deep countryside and to avoid any further battles.
Shanghai Commune	1927	Shanghai	China	Was a provisional administration that briefly governed the city of Shanghai during the Northern Expedition. Established by people's committees with the assistance of Chen Duxiu, Zhou Enlai, and the Chinese Communist Party (CCP), the commune briefly administered the city of Shanghai before its forceful dissolution by order of Chiang Kai-shek.
Republic of Ararat	1927–1930	Doğubayazıt	Turkey	One of the first Kurdish republics in history, founded in Ağrı Province, Turkey.
Sichuan	1927–1938	?	China	A group of warlords in the warlord era in China. During the period from 1927 to 1938, Sichuan was in the hands of six warlords: Liu Xiang, Yang Sen, Liu Wenhui, Deng Xihou, He Zhaode, and Tian Songyao, with minor forces being Xiong Kewu and Lü Chao.
Emirate of Afghanistan	1929	Kabul	Afghanistan	Government set up in Kabul during the Afghan Civil War (1928–1929). Was not recognized by any country.
Korean People's Association in Manchuria	1929–1931	Hailin	China	An autonomous anarchist zone in Manchuria near Korea populated by two million Korean migrants.
Nghệ-Tĩnh Soviet	1930–1931	?	Vietnam	The series of uprisings, strikes and demonstrations in 1930 and 1931 by Vietnamese peasants, workers, and intellectuals against the colonial French regime, the mandarinate, and landlords. Nghệ-Tĩnh (Vietnamese: [ŋêˀ tǐŋˀ]) is a compound name for the two central provinces, Nghệ An and Hà Tĩnh, where the revolt mainly took place. Demonstrations expressed the general anger against French colonial policies such as heavy taxation and state monopolies on certain goods, as well as the corruption and perceived unfairness of local notables and mandarins.
Hunan–Jiangxi Soviet	1931–1935	?	China	Now part of People's Republic of China.
Chinese Soviet Republic	1931–1937	Ruijin, Bao'an, Yan'an	China	Recognised by the People's Republic of China (PRC) as a "rehearsal" of the PRC and a "cradle" in which the Communist Party seized power.
Manchukuo	1932–1945	Changchun, Tonghua	China	A Japanese puppet state not recognised by most allied powers.
Mengjiang	1932–1945	Zhangjiakou	China	Puppet state of the Empire of Japan.
First East Turkestan Republic	1933–1934	Kashgar	China	Set up as part of the movement for an independent Xinjiang. It was defeated by the Nationalists of the Republic of China.
Fujian People's Government	1933–1934	Fuzhou	China	Formed following the Fujian Incident, when the former 19th Route Army of the National Revolutionary Army broke with commander Chiang Kai-shek and declared a new government. Although originally enjoying popular support, the government lost favour and was crushed by Nationalist forces in 1934.
Northwest Chinese Soviet Federation	1935–1936	Mao, Barkam, Jinchuan, Garzê	China	Was a confederation of two ethnic minority governments established on May 30, 1935, including the ethnically Gyalrong Revolutionary Government of the Republic of Geledesha and the Tibetan People's Republic.
Tibetan People's Republic	1936	Dêgê	China	The ethnically Tibetan half of the Northwest Chinese Soviet Federation.
Great Way Government	1937–1938	Pudong	China	The Great Way or Dadao Government, formally the Great Way Municipal Government of Shanghai, was a short-lived puppet government proclaimed in Pudong on December 5, 1937, to administer Japanese-occupied Shanghai in the early stages of the Second Sino-Japanese War.
South Chahar Autonomous Government	1937–1939	Kalgan	China	Another regional puppet state of Japan established after the Second Sino-Japanese War. The Government was one of the three components of the Mengjiang state, meant to represent ethnic Mongolians. The Autonomous Government was merged with the other two components of Mengjiang, due to infighting between the three, to form the united Mengjiang United Autonomous Government.
Hatay State	1938–1939	Antakya	Turkey	A transitional political entity that existed from 7 September 1938 to 29 June 1939, being located in the territory of the Sanjak of Alexandretta of the French Mandate of Syria. The state was transformed de facto into the Hatay Province of Turkey on 7 July 1939, de jure joining the country on 23 July 1939
Wang Jingwei regime	1940–1945	Nanjing	China	Puppet government of the Empire of Japan dissolved at the end of World War II. Recognized by the Empire of Japan and its allies.
Second Philippine Republic	1943–1945	Manila, Baguio	Philippines	The Second Philippine Republic, officially known as the Republic of the Philippines or known in the Philippines as Japanese-sponsored Philippine Republic, was a puppet state established on October 14, 1943, during the Japanese occupation.
State of Burma	1943–1945	Yangon	Myanmar	Japanese puppet state.
Provisional Government of Free India	1943–1945	Port Blair	India	Japanese puppet state. Had diplomatic relationships with eleven countries including Germany, Italy, Japan, Philippines, and the Soviet Union.
Second East Turkestan Republic	1944–1949	Ghulja	China	Soviet satellite state set up in Xinjiang. The Soviets later turned against it and approved its incorporation by China.
Kingdom of Luang Prabang	1945	Luang Prabang	Laos	Japanese puppet state that preceded the Lao Issara.
/ Empire of Vietnam	1945	Huế	Vietnam	Japanese puppet state that preceded the Democratic Republic of Vietnam.
Kingdom of Kampuchea	1945	Phnom Penh	Cambodia	Japanese puppet state that preceded the second French protectorate of Cambodia.
Inner Mongolian People's Republic	1945	Sonid Right Banner	China	During World War II, the Japanese support in Inner Mongolia was established, and a new puppet state named Mengjiang was created. In August 1945, it was destroyed by Soviet and Mongolian troops. On September 9, 1945, the Sunid Yutsi held a Congress of People's Representatives and aimags khoshuns of Inner Mongolia. Held for three days, the Congress proclaimed the establishment of the People's Republic of Inner Mongolia and elected an interim government. In November, the Chinese Communist Party managed to bring the situation under control, and reorganized the Provisional Government of the People's Republic of Inner Mongolia in the Inner Mongolian Autonomous Government.
Hòn Gai-Cẩm Phả Commune	1945	Hòn Gai, Cẩm Phả	Vietnam	Anti-Japanese and anti-French Trotskyist state established in the Hòn Gai-Cẩm Phả coal region north of Haiphong.
Saigon Commune	1945	Saigon	Vietnam	Anti-Japanese and anti-French Trotskyist state established in the Saigon, the capital of South Vietnam.
Kingdom of Laos	1945–1946	Vientiane, Luang Prabang	Laos	Partisan state.
Azerbaijan People's Government	1945–1946	Tabriz	Iran	Soviet puppet state set up in Iranian Azerbaijan but later reclaimed by Iran.
People's Republic of Jeju Island	1945–1946	Jeju Island	South Korea	People's Committees on Jeju Island were functioning successfully as a de facto government with popular support. Its collapse eventually led to a rebellion on the Island.
Republic of Indonesia	1945–1949	Jakarta	Indonesia	Independence de facto recognized by the Netherlands, de jure recognition by Egypt, Syria, and Lebanon.
(Kurdistan Region) Republic of Mahabad	1946–1947	Mahabad	Iran	Declared independence from Iran, but then occupied by Iran after the withdrawal of the Soviet Red Army from the north of the country.
Khanate of Kalat	1947–1948	Kalat	Pakistan	Kalat was a princely state in Baluchistan Agency, one of the agencies of British India. The Khan of Kalat declared his nation's independence on August 15, 1947, one day after India and Pakistan declared independence. From 15 August 1947 to 27 March 1948, the region was de facto independent before acceding to Pakistan on 27 March 1948. After intense diplomatic pressure, the Khan relented and acceded Kalat to Pakistan in 1948.
Manipur State	1947–1949	Imphal	India and Myanmar	Manipur was a princely state of the British Indian Empire from 1891 to 1947. It was granted independence at midnight of 14 August 1947. From 14 August 1947 to October 1949, the region was de jure independent, before acceding to India on 15 October 1949. After intense diplomatic pressure, the Manipur King Bodhchandra Singh relented and acceded Manipur to India in 1949 following the Manipur Merger Agreement.
State of Pasundan	1948–1949	Bandung	Indonesia	Originally established as the Pasundan Republic on 4 May 1947 by Musa Suriakartalegawa, who was backed by the Dutch colonial government, it would become the State of Pasundan on 26 February 1948. Pasundan was incorporated into the newly independent Republic of Indonesia on 27 December 1949 and dissolved on 11 March 1950, being succeeded by the modern Indonesian province of West Java.
Republic of South Maluku	1950–1963	Ambon	Indonesia	The Moluccas formed part of the United States of Indonesia (27 December 1949 – 17 August 1950), but declared independence in April 1950 in reaction of centralizing tendencies from Jakarta. It was quickly conquered by Indonesian troops, but maintains a government in exile in the Netherlands.
Free Dadra and Nagar Haveli	1954–1961	Silvassa	India	Territory made up of two former exclaves of the Portuguese district of Daman (Portuguese India). In 1954, it was invaded and occupied by supporters of their integration in the Indian Union. Thereafter and until formal annexation by India in 1961, it enjoyed a de facto independence. Portugal continued to consider Dadra and Nagar Haveli as Portuguese territory until 1974. The native citizens of the territory continued to be entitled to the grant of Portuguese citizenship until 2006.
Revolutionary Government of the Republic of Indonesia	1958–1961	Padang	Indonesia	A revolutionary government set up in Sumatra to oppose the central government of Indonesia in 1958. Although frequently referred to as the PRRI/Permesta rebellion, the Permesta rebels were a separate movement in Sulawesi, that had pledged allegiance with the PRRI on 17 February 1958.
(United Suvadive Republic) Suvadive Islands	1959–1963	Hithadhoo	Maldives	Attempted break-away state; it was supported by Britain briefly before being abandoned.
Republic of Timor	1961	Dili	Timor-Leste	Following the failed 1959 Viqueque rebellion, in early 1961 the Battle Office for the Liberation of Timor (Bureau de Luta pela Libertação de Timor) was formed under the leadership of Maoclao and backed by Indonesia. A republic was proclaimed in the border town of Batugade on 9 April 1961. It was quickly put down by Portuguese troops. The short-lived successor state, the Democratic Republic of East Timor, was only recognized by seven nations: China, Albania, Mozambique, Guinea-Bissau, Guinea-Conakry, Cape Verde, and Sao Tome & Principe.
Kalimantan Utara	1962	?	Brunei	Failed attempt to establish a Republic in Brunei.
Shanghai People's Commune	1967	Shanghai	China	Attempt at recreating a Paris commune-style revolution in China.
Provisional Revolutionary Government of the Republic of South Vietnam	1969–1976	Tây Ninh, Lộc Ninh, Cam Lộ, Saigon	Vietnam	A puppet government of North Vietnam formed from the Provisional Revolutionary Government of the Republic of South Vietnam shadow government.
Fatahland	1969–1982	West Beirut	Lebanon	PLO controlled administration during the Lebanese Civil War. Emerged after the Six-Day War.
People's Republic of Tyre	1975	Tyre	Lebanon	PLO controlled administration during the Lebanese Civil War. Emerged after the Savoy Hotel attack.
Marounistan	1976–1991	Jounieh	Lebanon	Christian militia controlled administration during the Lebanese Civil War
(People's Republic of Kampuchea) Liberated Area of Cambodia	1978–1979	Snuol district	Cambodia	Territory in Cambodia controlled by the Kampuchean United Front for National Salvation. In 1979, the Vietnam took over Phnom Penh, the next day the Kampuchean People's Revolutionary Council Government was established to replace the Liberated Area of Cambodia.
Free Lebanon State	1979–1984	Marjayoun	Lebanon	In 1976, as a result of the ongoing civil war, the Lebanese army began to break up. Major Saad Haddad, commanding an army battalion in the south which had been part of the Army of Free Lebanon, broke away and founded a group known as the Free Lebanon Army (FLA). The FLA fought against various groups including the Palestine Liberation Organization (PLO), the Amal Movement and (after the 1982 Israeli invasion of Lebanon) the emerging Hezbollah. The 1978 Israeli invasion allowed the Free Lebanon Army to gain control over a much wider area in southern Lebanon. On April 18, 1979, Haddad proclaimed the area controlled by his force "Independent State of Free Lebanon" (Dawlet Lebnaan El Horr El Mest’ell) with the capital Beirut, though his actual headquarters were in Marjayoun. In May 1980, " Free Lebanon Army" was renamed "South Lebanon Army". The statehood claim was downplayed following the death of Haddad in 1984, though his successor Antouan Lahed continued to exercise some authority in Southern Lebanon until the year 2000. On 24 May 2000, following Israeli withdrawal and final collapse of the SLA, Lebanese forces occupied the small town Marjayoun, which was the "capital" of southern Lebanon.
Islamic Revolutionary State of Afghanistan	1980	?	Afghanistan	A small Salafist state located in the northern Bashgal Valley founded by cleric Mawlawi Afzal during the Afghan mujahideen insurgency.
Civil Administration of the Mountain	1983–1991	?	Lebanon	Druze Socialist Administration during the Lebanese Civil War.
Tamil Eelam	1984–2009	Trincomalee	Sri Lanka	For much the Sri Lankan Civil War, the northern and eastern parts of Sri Lanka were controlled by the Liberation Tigers of Tamil Eelam (LTTE), a Tamil militant organization which fought to establish a separate state known as "Tamil Eelam". Tamil Eelam was not recognized by any other state. After a failed 26-year military campaign, the Sri Lanka Armed Forces began a relentless offensive against the LTTE in 2006, beginning the final stage of the civil war. By 18 May 2009, the Sri Lankan Army had recaptured all land formerly controlled by the LTTE, and Tamil Eelam ceased to exist.
Gorno-Badakhshan Republic	1992	Khorugh	Tajikistan	When the civil war broke out in Tajikistan in 1992, the local government in Gorno-Badakhshan declared independence from the Republic of Tajikistan.
Democratic Republic of Yemen	1994	Aden	Yemen	Breakaway state formed during the 1994 civil war in Yemen. It only lasted six weeks before being reconquered.
Islamic Emirate of Kurdistan	1994–2003	Byara	Iraq	The Islamic Emirate of Kurdistan was a short-lived unrecognized Kurdish Islamic quasi-state from 1994 to 2003.
Islamic Emirate of Badakhshan	1996	Badakhshan	Afghanistan	An unrecognized Islamic state ruled by Sharia law in modern day Badakhshan Province, Afghanistan.
Islamic Emirate of Afghanistan	1996–2001	Kabul	Afghanistan and Pakistan	In 1996, The Taliban took control over Kabul but lost control of the regions they controlled in 2001. However, after the Fall of Kabul in 2021, the Taliban reinstated their rule.
Islamic Republic of Qa'im	2005	Al-Qa'im	Iraq	During the occupation of Al-Qa'im by Al-Qaeda in Iraq in 2005, AQI declared the Islamic Republic of Qa'im.
Islamic Emirate of Rafah	2009	Rafah	Palestine	A short-lived unrecognized Islamic state located in Rafah. It was founded by Jund Ansar Allah when they declared independence in 2009, two years after the Hamas takeover of Gaza. It collapsed after the 2009 Battle of Rafah.
Democratic Autonomous Administration of North and East Syria	2012–2026	Hasakah	Syria	A de facto independent state and self-proclaimed autonomous region of Syria, it was an ideological experiment in democratic confederalism. Following the January 2026 northeastern Syria offensive by government forces, it was forced to integrate into the Syrian government following the Fall of the Assad regime, with its institutions fully integrated into the Syrian state in 2026. It was not officially recognized as an autonomous region by the Syrian government or any other state, although the Parliament of Catalonia recognized it.
Bangsamoro Republik	2013	Davao City, Zamboanga City	Philippines	Following their defeat in Zamboanga City by the Armed Forces of the Philippines on September 28, 2013, the Moro National Liberation Front self-declared Bangsamoro Republic ceased to exist.
(Islamic State) Emirate of Azaz	2013–2014	Azaz	Syria	Proclaimed by the Islamic State following its capture of Azaz in 2013.
Islamic State of Iraq and the Levant	2013–2014	Baqubah	Syria and Iraq	Proclaimed after the Islamic State of Iraq expanded into Syria. The Islamic State of Iraq and the Levant was later abolished and replaced with the Islamic State.

== Europe ==
Name	Date	Capital	Now part of	Notes
Couto Misto	10th century–1868	Santiago de Rubiás	Spain and Portugal	De facto independent microstate on the border between Galicia (Spain) and Northern Portugal. By the 1864 Treaty of Lisbon, its territory was partitioned between Spain and Portugal.
Miecław's State	1037–1047	Płock	Poland	A state located in Masovia with capital in Płock. It was formed around 1037 by Miecław by breaking away from Duchy of Poland during the crisis inside the country. It existed until 1047, when Casimir I the Restorer, duke of Poland, reconquered the state into Duchy of Poland.
Duchy of Lithuania	1219–1251	Voruta?	Lithuania, Latvia, Belarus	Preceded the Kingdom of Lithuania, was also named Aukštaitija.
Republic of Poljica	1239–1807	Omiš	Croatia	Had a population of 6566 in 1806, was best known for its Poljica Statute.
Despotate of Lovech	1330–1446	Lovech	Bulgaria	Following the fall of the core Bulgarian state to the Ottomans in 1396, Lovech Fortress remained unconquered for another 50 years until after the Crusade of Varna.
Four Kingdoms of Estonia	1343	Tallinn	Estonia	Anti-Christian state established by pagan Estonian rebels during Saint George's Night Uprising, ruled by the Four Kings of Estonia.
Senarica	1343–1797	Senarica	Italy	Had a peak population of 300.
Kingdom of Saaremaa	1344	Pöide Castle	Estonia	Anti-Christian state established by pagan Estonian rebels during Saint George's Night Uprising, ruled by King Vesse of Saaremaa.
Duchy of Gniewkowo	1373–1374 1375–1377	Gniewkowo	Poland	A district principality and a fiefdom within the Kingdom of Poland during the era of fragmentation that was formed in 1314 from part of the Duchy of Inowrocław. The country was located in the Kuyavia and consisted of Gniewkowo and Słońsk Lands.
Principality of Wales	1400–1415	?	United Kingdom	Controlled a majority of Wales between 1403 and 1406.
Republic of Cospaia	1440–1826	Cospaia	Italy	Cospaia unexpectedly gained independence in 1440 after Pope Eugene IV, who was embroiled in a struggle with the Council of Basel, made a sale of territory to the Republic of Florence. By error, a small strip of land went unmentioned in the sale treaty, and its inhabitants declared themselves independent. On May 25, 1826, Cospaia was divided between Tuscany and the Papal States.
Golden Ambrosian Republic	1447–1450	Milan	Italy	Founded during the Milanese War of Succession.
Kingdom of Croatia	1526–1527	Cetin	Croatia	Following the death of the heirless Jagiellonian king Louis II on 29 August 1526, Croatia was left kingless until the 1527 election in Cetin when the Sabor elected the Habsburg Archduke of Austria, Ferdinand I, as the new Croatian king on 1 January 1527. The charter electing Ferdinand was confirmed with the seals of six Croatian nobles and four representatives of the Archduke.
Tsardom of Bačka	1526–1527	Subotica	Serbia, Hungary	After the fall of the Hungarian kingdom at the Battle of Mohács, Tsar Jovan Nenad established a short-lived Serbian rump state in Vojvodina which later fell at the Battle of Sződfalva.
Eastern Hungarian Kingdom	1526–1551, 1556–1570	Buda, Lipova, Alba Iulia	Slovakia, Hungary, Romania and Ukraine	Ruled by the Ottoman-backed Zápolya dynasty who did not accept the Habsburg claim over the entirety of Hungary.
Duchy of Syrmia	1527–1530/1532	Slankamen	Serbia	Duke Radoslav Čelnik who served in Jovan Nenad's army transferred power from Bačka to Syrmia after the tsar's death, and ruled the region for 3–5 years until the Ottomans conquered it.
First Earldom of Desmond	1569–1572	?	Ireland	Early war of Irish resistance to English rule.
Second Earldom of Desmond	1579–1582	?	Ireland	Early war of Irish resistance to English rule.
Polish–Swedish union	1592–1599	Kraków, Warsaw	Poland, Sweden, Finland, Estonia, Latvia, Lithuania, Belarus, Ukraine and Russia	Declared by Polish King Sigismund III Vasa who also succeeded his father, the Swedish King John III Vasa. Led to a Swedish civil war that ultimately resulted in the ejection of Sigismund from Sweden and the dissolution of the union. Successive Polish kings would maintain an uninterrupted claim on the Swedish throne until 1660.
Irish alliance	1593–1603	?	Ireland and United Kingdom	Early war of Irish resistance to English rule.
Kingdom of Bohemia	1618–1620	Prague	Czech Republic	At the beginning of the Thirty Years' War, the Bohemian kingdom declared independence from the Habsburg monarchy and temporarily elected Frederick V of the Palatinate as their new king, but the rebels were ultimately defeated at the Battle of the White Mountain.
Catalan Republic	1640–1641	Barcelona	Spain and France	Declared during the Reapers' War.
Grand Duchy of Lithuania	1655–1657	Kėdainiai	Lithuania, Belarus and Poland	A dominium directum protectorate of the Swedish Empire under the rule of King Charles X Gustav in accordance with the Union of Kėdainiai. It de jure existed from 1655 until 1657.
Grand Principality of Ruthenia	1658	Kyiv	Ukraine and Belarus	A project of Ruthenia (Ukraine) as a member of the Polish–Lithuanian–Ruthenian Commonwealth in the territory of Kiev Voivodeship, Bracław Voivodeship and Chernihiv Voivodeship. Its creation was proposed by Hetman Ivan Vyhovsky with Yuri Nemyrych and Pavlo Teteria in September 1658 during the negotiations between the Cossack Hetmanate and the Commonwealth. The project of the Duchy was approved in the first version of the Treaty of Hadiach, but later, because of the strong resistance of Polish society, the idea of the Grand Principality of Rus was completely abandoned.
Kingdom of Corsica	1736	Cervione, Corte	France	A short-lived kingdom on the island of Corsica. It was formed after the islanders crowned the German adventurer Theodor Stephan Freiherr von Neuhoff as King of Corsica.
Corsican Republic	1755–1769	Corte	France	Seceded from Republic of Genoa. Recognized only by Bey of Tunis.
Republic of Liège	1789–1791	Liège	Belgium	A short-lived state centred on the town of Liège in modern-day Belgium. The republic was created in August 1789 after the Liège Revolution led to the destruction of the earlier ecclesiastical state which controlled the territory, the Prince-Bishopric of Liège. It coexisted with the even more short-lived revolutionary state, the United States of Belgium, created by the Brabant Revolution of 1789, to the north. By 1791, the forces of the republic had been defeated by Prussian and Austrian forces and the Prince-Bishopric was restored.
Paris Commune	1789–1795	Paris	France	Declared during the French Revolution.
United Belgian States	1790	Brussels	Belgium and Luxembourg	A short-lived confederal republic in the Southern Netherlands (modern-day Belgium) established under the Brabant Revolution. It existed from January to December 1790 as part of the unsuccessful revolt against the Habsburg Emperor, Joseph II.
Rauracian Republic	1792	?	Switzerland	A short-lived French occupation zone that included parts of modern Switzerland around the Jura Mountains. It was created from the northern portion of the Prince-Bishopric of Basel, which was part of the Holy Roman Empire.
Bolognese Republic	1796	Bologna	Italy	Created in 1796 in the Central Italian city of Bologna. It merged the existing provinces of Bologna and Ferrara into one.
Cispadane Republic	1796–1797	Bologna	Italy	A short-lived client republic located in northern Italy, founded in 1796 with the protection of the French army, led by Napoleon Bonaparte. In the following year, it was merged with the Transpadane Republic (formerly the Duchy of Milan until 1796) to form the Cisalpine Republic. The Cispadane Republic was the first Italian sovereign state to adopt the Italian tricolour as its flag.
(Italy) Transpadane Republic	1796–1797	Milan	Italy	A sister republic of France established in Milan from 1796 to 1797.
Republic of Crema	1797	Crema	Italy	A revolutionary municipality in Lombardy, which was created when the French Army entered Crema on 28 March 1797.
Republic of Brescia	1797	Brescia	Italy	A temporary French client republic in Italy. Established March 18, 1797, in the wake of the French occupation of Brescia and Bergamo, it became part of the Cisalpine Republic November 20, 1797.
Republic of Bergamo	1797	Bergamo	Italy	Shortlived French client republic in Bergamo.
Ligurian Republic	1797–1805	Genoa	Italy	A French client republic formed by Napoleon on 14 June 1797. It consisted of the old Republic of Genoa, which covered most of the Ligurian region of Northwest Italy, and the small Imperial fiefs owned by the House of Savoy inside its territory.
Tiberina Republic	1798	Perugia	Italy	A revolutionary municipality proclaimed on 4 February 1798, when republicans took power in the city of Perugia. It was an occupation zone that took its name from the river Tiber. A month later, the government of all the Papal States was changed into a republic: the Roman Republic, which Perugia belonged to.
Republic of Connacht	1798	Castlebar	Ireland	French client republic.
Lemanic Republic	1798	Lausanne	Switzerland	Formerly a subject territory of Bern. The Lemanic Republic declared its independence in January 1798 before being incorporated into the Helvetic Republic as Canton of Léman (today: Vaud) in April of the same year.
Roman Republic	1798–1799	Rome	Italy	Declared on 15 February 1798, when the government of the Papal States was temporarily replaced by a republican government due to Pope Pius VI's departure to France where he later died.
The Gozitan Nation	1798–1801	Rabat	Malta	Independent kingdom under Neapolitan King Ferdinand III; actually ruled by a provisional government set up by Saverio Cassar, after French troops on the island capitulated to rebels. It became part of the British protectorate of Malta in 1801.
State of Lucca	1799	Lucca	Italy	After the war of the First Coalition, which ended with the Treaty of Campo Formio, the Government of the Republic of Lucca decided to start negotiations with the newly formed Cisalpine Republic with the aim of maintaining its independence. The jurist Luigi Matteucci, the father of the more famous Felice, was sent to Milan to negotiate with Napoleon. The republic was the only territory in all of continental Italy that the French army had not yet invaded and Matteucci's proposals were rejected, so much so that on 22 January 1799 the French troops entered the city, overthrowing the oligarchic republic and establishing a new centralized republic, with a democratic constitution, under the French protectorate. The constitution granted the government to an Executive Directory, with a bicameral legislature composed of the Council of Juniors and the Council of Seniors. The democracy did not last long.
Republic of Pescara	1799	Pescara	Italy	The short-lived provisional Jacobin government established in the fortress city of Pescara in 1799. It was a client state of the French First Republic and part of the wider Parthenopean Republic.
Revolutionary Serbia	1804–1813	Topola, Belgrade	Serbia, Bosnia and Herzegovina	The state established by the Serbian revolutionaries in Ottoman Serbia (Sanjak of Smederevo) after the start of the First Serbian Uprising against the Ottoman Empire in 1804. The Sublime Porte first officially recognized the state as autonomous in January 1807, however, the Serbian revolutionaries rejected the treaty and continued fighting the Ottomans until 1813.
Grand Duchy of Lithuania (1812)	1812	Vilnius	Belarus, Lithuania and Poland	Napoleonic attempt at restoring the historical Grand Duchy of Lithuania after the Grande Armée occupied Vilnius on 28 June 1812. Established on 1 July 1812, the provisional government had seven committees, a president, and even an army that cost 500,000 francs to create, along with a native Lithuanian regiment which served in Napoleon's Imperial Guard.
Lithuanian Provisional Governing Commission	1812–1813	Vilnius	Belarus, Lithuania and Poland	Merged with the Duchy of Warsaw to form the General Confederation of the Kingdom of Poland.
General Confederation of the Kingdom of Poland	1812–1813	Warsaw	Poland, Lithuania, Ukraine	A puppet state of France that was made from the reorganised Duchy of Warsaw during Napoleon's Russian campaign
Kingdom of Norway	1814	Oslo	Norway	Norway declared its independence, as a result of the refusal of the Treaty of Kiel after the Napoleonic Wars, adopted a Constitution and elected Danish Prince Christian Frederik as its own king. Resulting to a short war with Sweden, leading to Norway accepting entering into a personal union with Sweden at the Convention of Moss.
State of Franche-Comté	1814	Vesoul	France	A Short-lived state which existed from January 27 to June 6, 1814.
Republic of Pontecorvo	1820–1821	Pontecorvo	Italy	In April 1820, the Carbonari, a secretive revolutionary organisation, unilaterally declared the secession of the exclave of Pontecorvo from the Papal States. Pontecorvo requested twice to join the Kingdom of the Two Sicilies but both attempts were refused, with the Two Sicilies wishing not to negotiate the affairs of the exclave except through the Pope. The republic was occupied by Austrian forces in March 1821 which restored it to the Papal States.
Messenian Senate	1821	Kalamata	Greece	Unrecognised Protostate during the Greek war of independence. It was the first move towards the creation of the Peloponnesian Senate.
Achaean Directory	1821–1822	Patras	Greece	Unrecognised Protostate during the Greek war of independence. It was a form of local administration that operated in Achaia during the first months of the war.
Senate of Western Continental Greece	1821–1823	Missolonghi	Greece	Unrecognised Protostate during the Greek war of independence. It was a provisional regime that existed in western Central Greece during the early stages of the war.
Peloponnesian Senate	1821–1823	Tripoli	Greece	Unrecognised Protostate during the Greek war of independence. It was a provisional regime that existed in the Peloponnese during the early stages of the war.
Areopagus of Eastern Continental Greece	1821–1825	Amfissa	Greece	Unrecognised Protostate during the Greek war of independence. It was a provisional regime that existed in eastern Central Greece during the war.
Military-Political System of Samos	1821–1834	Vathy	Greece	Unrecognised Protostate during the Greek war of independence. It was a provisional regime that existed in the island of Samos during the war.
Provisional Government of the Island of Crete	1822	Armeni	Greece	Unrecognised Protostate during the Greek war of independence. It was equivalent to the First National Assembly of Epidaurus that had preceded it.
First Hellenic Republic	1822–1832	Nafplio	Greece	The provisional Greek state during the Greek Revolution against the Ottoman Empire. From 1822 until 1827, it was known as the Provisional Administration of Greece, and between 1827 and 1832, it was known as the Hellenic State.
(Italy) Italian United Provinces	1831	Bologna	Italy	A short-lived state (a Republic) that was established in 1831 in some territories of the Papal States (Romagna, Marche and Umbria) and in the Duchies of Parma and Modena. It existed from 5 February (following the popular uprising in Bologna, when the temporal power of the Pope and the Emilian Dukes were declared to be revoked) until 26 April, the day the city of Ancona was taken by the Austrian troops.
Kingdom of Poland	1831	Warsaw	Poland	A Polish shadow government established during the November Uprising.
Kingdom of Tavolara	1836–1962?	Tavolara	Italy	The Bertoleoni family claimed to be monarchs of an island off the northeast coast of Sardinia.
Sonderbund	1845–1847	?	Switzerland	A rival Confederation which broke away from Switzerland in 1845 to protect their interests against a centralization of power.
Provisional Government of Milan	1848	Milan	Italy	Italian revolutionary state established during the Revolutions of 1848.
Sicily	1848–1849	Palermo	Italy	Italian revolutionary state established during the Revolutions of 1848.
Repubblica di San Marco	1848–1849	Venice	Italy	Following 1848 unrests, the republic was proclaimed in 1848 in the territories of Venetia with the capital Venice. Allied with the other Italian states against the Austrian Empire, it eventually voted to federate under the Kingdom of Sardinia, but it went back to independence after Piedmontese defeat. Remaining only Venice and its lagoon under control, the republic surrendered after almost 5 months of siege and after 17 months of existence.
German Empire	1848–1849	Frankfurt	Germany	A short-lived proto-state which existed from 1848 to 1849. In one view, it was a revolutionary new created national state. According to another view, it was the reformed German Confederation.
Free Cities of Menton and Roquebrune	1848–1849	Roquebrune, Menton	France	A union of two cities who seceded from Monaco due to high tax rates and increasing poverty, later absorbed by the Kingdom of Piedmont-Sardinia.
Serbian Vojvodina	1848–1849	Sremski Karlovci, Zemun, Zrenjanin, Timișoara	Serbia and Romania	A short-lived self-proclaimed Serb autonomous province within the Austrian Empire during the Revolutions of 1848, which existed until 1849 when it was transformed into the new (official) Austrian province named Voivodeship of Serbia and Banat of Temeschwar.
Hungarian State	1849	Buda	Hungary, Romania, Serbia, Austria, Slovakia and Ukraine	A short-lived unrecognised state that existed for 4 months in the last phase of the Hungarian Revolution of 1848–49.
Roman Republic	1849–1850	Rome	Italy and Vatican City	A short-lived state declared on 9 February 1849, when the government of the Papal States was temporarily replaced by a republican government due to Pope Pius IX's departure to Gaeta. The republic was led by Carlo Armellini, Giuseppe Mazzini, and Aurelio Saffi. Together they formed a triumvirate, a reflection of a form of government during the first century BC crisis of the Roman Republic.
(Kingdom of Italy) United Provinces of Central Italy	1859–1860	Modena	Italy	A short-lived military government established in 1859 by the Kingdom of Piedmont-Sardinia. It was formed by a union of the former Grand Duchy of Tuscany, the Duchy of Parma, the Duchy of Modena, and the Papal Legations, after the Second Italian War of Independence.
Polish National Government	1863–1864	Warsaw, Vilnius, Kyiv	Poland	A Polish shadow government established during the January Uprising.
Croatian People's Government	1871	Rakovica	Croatia	Attempt by Croatian revolutionary Eugen Kvaternik at restoring Croatian statehood after 769 years of foreign rule. The revolt lasted from 8 October 1871 to 11 October 1871.
Catalan State	1873	Barcelona	Spain	Shortlived state in Catalonia and the Balearic Islands.
Canton of Cartagena	1873–1874	Cartagena	Spain	In 1873 Cartagena was proclaimed as an independent canton, called the Canton of Cartagena. This proclamation started the Cantonal Revolution in Spain, during the First Spanish Republic. It was the beginning of the cantonalism, a movement that sought to establish a federal state composed of autonomous cantons. Some cities and territories joined the cantonal cause and were declared independents too, but they surrendered a few days later. The only canton with an organized government as state, control on its territory and military power was Cartagena, which declared war and faced the Spanish central government during six months, until it was invaded.
Republic of Tamrash	1878–1886	?	Bulgaria	The Republic of Tamrash was a self-governing administrative structure of the Pomaks, living in the Tamrash region of the Rhodope Mountains.
Gurian Republic	1902–1906	Ozurgeti	Georgia	The Gurian Republic or the Gurian peasant republic was an insurrection that took place in the western Georgian province Guria (then part of the Imperial Russia) prior to and during the Russian Revolution of 1905. Republic existed from the November 1905 to January 10, 1906.
Kruševo Republic	1903	Kruševo	North Macedonia	Republic established in Kruševo, North Macedonia at the start of the Ilinden Uprising. It lasted solely 10 days, from the third to the thirteenth of August. It can be considered as one of the first modern governments with leftist views, as both the president, Nikola Karev and his co-writer of the Kruševo Manifesto, Nikola Kirov, were socialists and members of the Bulgarian Social Democratic Workers' Party.
Strandzha Commune	1903	Malko Tarnovo	Bulgaria and Turkey	Rebel polity in the Ottoman Empire region during the Ilinden–Preobrazhenie Uprising.
Liubotyn Republic and Shuliavka Republic	1905	Liubotyn, Shuliavka	Ukraine	The Lyubotinskaya Republic — proclaimed in December 1905, independent workers' state in the armed insurrection of the workers and railwaymen in Lyubotin during the Russian Revolution of 1905. Republic existed from the December 26 to 30, 1905. The Shuliavka Republic was an early 20th-century worker-based quasi-government organization in the city of Kiev, Ukraine, whose main task was self-defence. The uprising lasted a total of four days, from December 12–16 (o.s., in the Gregorian Calendar, 26–29), 1905.
Republic of Zagłębie and Republic of Sławków	1905	Zagłębie Dąbrowskie, Sławków	Poland	The Polish towns Zagłębie Dąbrowskie and Sławków were taken over by revolutionaries during the Russian Revolution of 1905. Both republics existed in November–December 1905, each about 10–12 days.
Chita Republic, Krasnoyarsk Republic, Novorossiysk Republic, Sochi Republic, Stary Buyan Republic	1905–1906	Chita, Krasnoyarsk, Novorossiysk, Sochi	Russia	The Chita Republic was a workers and peasants' dictatory republic in Chita during the Russian Revolution of 1905, installed by actual seizure of power in Chita RSDLP Committee and the Council of Soldiers 'and Cossacks' Deputies in November 1905 – January 1906. The Krasnoyarsk Republic — government, organized by the Joint Board of Workers' and Soldiers' Deputies in Krasnoyarsk during the First Russian Revolution. Lasted from 9 to 27 December 1905. The Novorossiysk Republic — the worker-peasant self-government established by the Council of Workers' Deputies in Novorossiysk on 12 December 1905 and lasted until 26 December of the same year. The Sochi Republic — political education social democratic sense, arising from the modern city of Sochi as a result of the revolutionary uprisings of 1905, lasted from December 28, 1905, to January 5, 1906 (i.e., about 9 days). The Starobuyanskaya Republic — peasant self-government established during the First Russian Revolution in the village of Stary Buyan, lasted from 12 to 26 November 1905.
Markovo Republic	1905–1906	Markovo	Russia	The Markovo Republic was a self-proclaimed peasant state, located in Russia, in the Volokolamsk area. It was proclaimed on October 18, 1905, when during the Russian Revolution of 1905 peasants took control of the local government in the village Markovo and 5 other villages. It had existed until July 18, 1906.
Republic of Ostrowiec	1905–1906	Ostrowiec Świętokrzyski	Poland	The Republic of Ostrowiec (Republika Ostrowiecka) — government set December 27, 1905 during the First Russian Revolution in cities Ostrowiec, Iłża, Ćmielów and locality. Republic fell in the middle of January 1906.
Free State of Ikaria	1912	Agios Kirykos	Greece	Small shortlived state on the island of Ikaria and some Neighbouring islands such as Fournoi Korseon.
Provisional Government of Western Thrace	1913	Komotini	Greece and Bulgaria	A small, short-lived republic from August 31 to October 25, 1913, at the end of the Second Balkan War when Western Thrace was then occupied by the Ottoman Empire. It was founded as a state with Ottoman support, in order to avoid Bulgarian rule after the Treaty of Bucharest, in which the Ottomans had not taken part. Under British pressure, the Balkan powers and the Ottomans signed the Treaty of Constantinople, which satisfied the Turkish claims to recognition of Eastern Thrace. The Ottomans withdrew their forces and by 25 October, the area was annexed by Bulgaria.
Republic of Central Albania	1913–1914	Durrës	Albania	The Republic of Central Albania was a republic declared following the pullout of Ottoman forces from the former Albanian Vilayet. Declared by Essad Pasha Toptani, the republic's existence came to an end when the troops of William of Wied took control of the country.
Autonomous Republic of Northern Epirus	1914	Gjirokastër	Albania	A short-lived, self-governing entity founded in the aftermath of the Balkan Wars on 28 February 1914, by the local Greek population in southern Albania (Northern Epirotes).
General Government of Galicia and Bukovina	1914–1917	Lviv	Poland and Ukraine	A temporary Imperial Russian military administration of eastern parts of the Kingdom of Galicia and Lodomeria captured from Austria-Hungary during World War I.
General Government of Belgium	1914–1918	Brussels	Belgium	A German Army occupation administration which administered one of the three separate occupation zones established in German-occupied Belgium during the First World War.
Government General of Warsaw	1915–1918	Warsaw	Poland	An administrative civil district created by the German Empire in World War I. It encompassed the north-western half of the former Russian-ruled Congress Poland.
Military Government of Lublin	1915–1918	Kielce, Lublin	Poland	A military administration of an area of the Russian Empire under the occupation of Austria-Hungary, during the World War I, that existed from 1915 to 1917. It was administered under the command of Governors-General, with the seat of government originally based in Kielce, and in October 1915, moved to Lublin.
Samarina Republic	1917	Samarina	Greece	First Attempt at an Aromanian State.
Provisional Land Council of Vidzeme	1917	Valmiera	Latvia	Created in the Governorate of Livonia on March 13, 1917 following the democratic February Revolution in Russian Empire. Initially it supported ideas of Latvian land unity and self-determination, but by the second half of 1917 it came under increasing Bolshevik influence and on January 2, 1918 it ceased to exist, relinquishing its authority to the Bolshevik Iskolat.
Provisional Land Council of Courland	1917	Tartu	Latvia	Created on 27 April 1917 in Tartu as the representative organ of Courland Governorate. Because Courland was under German military occupation since the summer of 1915, the Council was created in Estonian city of Tartu, and following the German offensive, was evacuated to Russian city Kazan in October 1917.
Crimean People's Republic	1917–1918	Bakhchysarai	Ukraine	Defeated by the Red Army.
Provisional Land Council of Latgale	1917–1918	Daugavpils?	Latvia	The Provisional Land Council was a temporary governing body formed amid revolutionary upheaval to address urgent land reforms and local self-governance.
Moldavian Democratic Republic	1917–1918	Chișinău	Moldova and Ukraine	Joined Kingdom of Romania.
Ukrainian People's Republic of Soviets	1917–1918	Kharkiv	Ukraine	Soviet Russia puppet state created on efforts of the local Bolsheviks and military support from Moscow and Petrograd. It was cleared out of Ukraine by the Ukrainian People's Republic with the help from Germany and Austria.
Executive Committee of the Soviet of Workers, Soldiers, and the Landless in Latvia	1917–1918	Cēsis, Valka	Latvia	The governing body in the territory of Latvia that was under control of the pro-Communist Red Latvian Riflemen in 1917–1918.
The South-Eastern Union of Cossack Troops, Highlanders of the Caucasus, and Free Peoples of the Steppes	1917–1918	Yekaterinodar	Ukraine and Russia	Short-lived anti-Bolshevik confederation.
Kingdom of Poland	1917–1918	Warsaw	Poland	A short-lived polity that was proclaimed during World War I by the German Empire and Austria-Hungary on 5 November 1916 on the territories of formerly Russian-ruled Congress Poland held by the Central Powers as the Government General of Warsaw and which became active on 14 January 1917. It was subsequently transformed between 7 October 1918 and 22 November 1918 into the independent Second Polish Republic, the customary ceremonial founding date of the latter being later set at 11 November 1918. In spite of the initial total dependence of this client state on its sponsors,
Union of Highlanders	1917–1919	Buynaksk	Russia	Also known as the Mountainous Republic of the Northern Caucasus.
Bashkurdistan	1917–1919	Orenburg, Chelyabinsk	Russia	After the Russian Revolution, the All-Bashkir Qoroltays (convention) concluded that it was necessary to form an independent Bashkir republic within Russia. As a result, on 15 November 1917, the Bashkir Regional (central) Shuro (Council), ruled by Äxmätzäki Wälidi Tıwğan proclaimed the establishment of the first independent Bashkir Republic in areas of predominantly Bashkir population: Orenburg, Perm, Samara, Ufa provinces and the autonomous entity Bashkurdistan on November 15, 1917. This effectively made Bashkortostan the first ever democratic Turkic republic in history, preceding Crimea, Idel-Ural, and Azerbaijan. Annexed by the Russian Soviet Federative Socialist Republic in March 1919 and succeeded by the Bashkir Autonomous Soviet Socialist Republic.
Orenburg Cossack Republic	1917–1920	Orenburg	Russia	Provisional government established by Cossacks in Orenburg.
Russian Soviet Federative Socialist Republic	1917–1922	Saint Petersburg, Moscow	Russia	Revolutionary soviet state led by Vladimir Lenin during the Russian civil war.
Baku Soviet Commune	1918	Baku	Azerbaijan	The commune was established in the city of Baku, which was then the capital of the briefly independent Azerbaijan Democratic Republic, and is now the capital of the Republic of Azerbaijan. The commune, led by Stepan Shahumyan, existed until 26 July 1918 when the Bolsheviks were forced out of power by a coalition of Dashnaks, Right SRs and Mensheviks. After their overthrow, the Baku commissars attempted to leave Baku but were captured by the Centrocaspian Dictatorship and imprisoned. On 14 September 1918, during the fall of Baku to Ottoman forces, Red Army soldiers broke into their prison and freed the commissars; they then boarded a ship to Krasnovodsk, where they were promptly arrested by local authorities and, on the night of 20 September, executed by a firing squad between the stations of Pereval and Akhcha-Kuyma on the Transcaspian Railway by soldiers of the Ashkhabad Committee. They were executed for essentially letting the Islamic Army of the Caucasus seize Baku.
Committee of Members of the Constituent Assembly	1918	Samara	Russia	An anti-Bolshevik government that operated in Samara, Russia, during the Russian Civil War of 1917–1922. It formed on June 8, 1918, after the Czechoslovak Legion had occupied the city.
Mainz Workers' and Soldiers' Council	1918	Mainz	Germany	The effective government of Mainz from 9 November until the arrival of French troops on 9 December 1918 during the German Revolution of 1918.
Republic of Zakopane	1918	Zakopane	Poland	An area in Galicia centered on the city of Zakopane that created its own parliament ("National Organisation") on October 13, 1918. The parliament's principal goal was to join an independent state of Poland. On October 30, the Organisation officially declared its independence from Austria-Hungary and, two days later, made itself a "National Council". This was eventually disestablished on November 16 when the Polish Liquidation Committee took control of Galicia.
Supreme Administration of the Northern Region	1918	Arkhangelsk	Russia	An anti-Bolshevik left-wing Allied government part of the White movement during the Russian Civil War. Allied warships sailed into the port from the White Sea.
Idel-Ural State	1918	Ufa	Russia	An unsuccessful attempt of the autonomy of Tatar peoples that claimed to unite Tatars, Bashkirs, and the Chuvash in the turmoil of the Russian Civil War. The republic was proclaimed on 1 March 1918, by a Congress of Muslims from Russia's interior and Siberia, but defeated by Bolsheviks the same month. Idel-Ural means "Volga-Ural" in the Tatar language.
Republic of Heinzenland	1918	Mattersburg	Austria	A short-lived and unrecognized nation in the region now known as the Austrian federal state of Burgenland, aimed at protecting the German-speaking population in Western Hungary.
Slovak People's Republic	1918	Košice	Slovakia	A short-lived state that lasted from 11 December to 29 December 1918. The Eastern Slovak National Council was established as an organisation concurrent to the Slovak National Council in November 1918. The council was led by Viktor Dvorcsák, an advocate and ex-archivist from Prešov working for the Hungarian revisionist movement.
State of Slovenes, Croats and Serbs	1918	Zagreb	Slovenia, Croatia, Bosnia and Herzegovina	Temporary state of the Austro-Hungarian South Slavs, declared on 29 October 1918, and merged with the Kingdom of Serbia on 1 December 1918, into the Kingdom of Serbs, Croats and Slovenes (Yugoslavia).
First Republic of Pińczów	1918	Pińczów	Poland	Area of Pińczów and the surrounding area which was captured at the end of 1918 for a period of six weeks by the city's inhabitants, led by Jan Lisowski, after the disarmament of the occupation troops without a fight.
Finnish Socialist Workers' Republic	1918	Helsinki	Finland and Russia	Lasted only three months during the Finnish Civil War, but was recognized by Soviet Russia.
Republic of Vorarlberg	1918	Bregenz	Austria	Amidst the chaos in collapse of the Austro-Hungarian empire the Vorarlbergers proclaimed themselves a separate non-Austrian, Germanic people and declared on 3 November 1918 the independence as Republic of Vorarlberg. The secession was blocked by the Allies and the new Austrian republican government. In April 1919, over 80% of the Vorarlbergers voted to secede from Austria and attach themselves to Switzerland, but they were again blocked.
Alsace-Lorraine Soviet Republic (Republic of Alsace–Lorraine)	1918	Strasbourg	France	The Soviet Republic, existed in Alsace from 10 to 22 November 1918.
Banat Republic	1918	Timișoara	Romania, Serbia and Hungary	Established in the Banat region of modern Serbia by members of ethnic groups in the region, it was only recognized by Hungary. It was invaded by Serbia and in 1919 partitioned between Hungary, Romania, and the newly created Yugoslavia.
Bunjevac People's Republic	1918	Sombor	Serbia	Proclaimed at Sombor in alliance with the Banat Republic to represent the interests of the Catholic Bunjevci.
Terek Soviet Republic	1918	Pyatigorsk, Vladikavkaz	Russia	A short-lived republic on the territory of the former Terek Oblast. Its capital was first Pyatigorsk, and later Vladikavkaz.
Don Soviet Republic	1918	Rostov-on-Don	Russia	A short-lived Soviet republic of the Russian Soviet Federative Socialist Republic that existed from March to May 1918. Claiming the territory of the Don Host Oblast, the republic was proclaimed in March 1918 after the retreat of the White Army from the area. In May, after the revolt of the Don Cossacks and the German advance into the region as a result of the Treaty of Brest-Litovsk, the republic was overthrown and its leaders fled. The Don Cossacks' Don Republic took over the territory of the Don Soviet Republic.
Chuvashia	1918	?	Russia	The third indigenous Volga state declared during the Russian Civil War after Idel-Ural and Bashkurdistan.
Duchy of Courland and Semigallia	1918	Riga	Latvia	German Client State.
Lithuania	1918	Vilnius	Lithuania	An attempt to establish an independent constitutional Lithuanian monarchy in February 1918. It was created towards the end of World War I when Lithuanian-speaking lands were under military occupation by the German Empire. The state was officially dissolved in November 1918.
Republic of Tarnobrzeg	1918–1919	Tarnobrzeg	Poland	The Republic of Tarnobrzeg was proclaimed November 6, 1918 in the Polish town of Tarnobrzeg. Disestablished spring 1919.
Crimean Regional Government	1918–1919	Simferopol	Ukraine	Short-lived government in the Crimean Peninsula. The Regional Government was a German puppet state that collapsed soon after the withdrawal of the German forces. The new state soon started to crumble due to tensions with Anton Denikin's Volunteer Army and fell after the Allies withdrew.
Kars Republic	1918–1919	Kars	Turkey	Declared by Muslims in Eastern Anatolia seeking unification with Azerbaijan.
Provisional Workers' and Peasants' Government of Ukraine	1918–1919	Kharkiv	Ukraine	A provisional Soviet administration created to govern the areas, in Ukraine, occupied by Soviet Russia.
West Ukrainian People's Republic	1918–1919	Lviv, Ternopil, Ivano-Frankivsk, Zalishchyky	Ukraine	Established in eastern Galicia leading to a losing war with Poland after which it was overrun by Poland and its government joined the Ukrainian People's Republic.
Komancza Republic	1918–1919	Komańcza	Ukraine	An association of 30 pro-Ukrainian villages, it planned to merge with the West Ukrainian People's Republic but was suppressed by Poland during the Polish-Ukrainian War.
Republic of German-Austria	1918–1919	Vienna	Austria and Czech Republic	Brief state declared following the collapse of Austria-Hungary. The Allies of World War I opposed it and it was succeeded by the First Austrian Republic.
Lithuanian Soviet Socialist Republic	1918–1919	Vilnius	Lithuania	A short-lived Soviet puppet state during the early Interwar period. It was declared on 16 December 1918 by a provisional revolutionary government led by Vincas Mickevičius-Kapsukas. It ceased to exist on 27 February 1919, when it was merged with the Socialist Soviet Republic of Byelorussia to form the Lithuanian–Byelorussian Soviet Socialist Republic (Litbel).
Commune of the Working People of Estonia	1918–1919	Narva	Estonia	A communist government that administered the Bolshevik occupied areas of Estonia during the Estonian War of Independence.
Republic of Aras	1918–1919	Nakhchivan	Azerbaijan	Established during the Russian Civil War, this state only lasted several months.
North Caucasian Soviet Republic	1918–1919	Yekaterinodar; Pyatigorsk	Russia	The product of the merger of the three soviet republics of the North Caucasus, the Kuban–Black Sea Soviet Republic, the Stavropol Soviet Republic and the Terek Soviet Republic, in an effort to consolidate Communist influence in the region. After the capture of Yekaterinodar by the Volunteer Army, the White Movement began an assault on the territories of the Republic. In 1919, All-Russian Central Executive Committee abolished the republic.
Rudabel Republic	1918–1920	Rudabelka	Belarus	Bolshevik state established in Rudabelka.
Republic of Batumi	1918–1920	Batumi	Georgia	British Puppet State during the Russian Civil War led by James Cooke-Collis.
Ossetian Soviet Socialist Republic	1918–1920	Tskhinvali	South Ossetia	Succeeded by the South Ossetian Autonomous Oblast.
Kuban People's Republic	1918–1920	Krasnodar	Russia	A territory in Russia, it was declared by Kuban Cossacks in 1918. It supported the White Movement and was overrun by the Bolsheviks in 1920. De jure recognized by Ukraine, Azerbaijan, Germany, Turkey, Georgia, and the Mountain Republic.
Don Republic	1918–1920	Novocherkassk	Russia	Republic was established on the historic territory of the Don Cossacks and was recognized by the Ukrainian State. In 1919 it was part of the Armed Forces of South Russia and eventually overran by Bolsheviks with its annexation to the Soviet Russia and decossackization.
Latvian Socialist Soviet Republic	1918–1920	Riga, Daugavpils	Latvia	A short-lived socialist republic formed during the Latvian War of Independence. It was proclaimed on 17 December 1918 with the political, economic, and military backing of Vladimir Lenin and his Bolshevik government in the Russian SFSR. The head of government was Pēteris Stučka with Jūlijs Daniševskis as his deputy.
Latvian Provisional Government	1918–1920	Riga, Liepāja	Latvia and Belarus	Established during the Latvian War of Independence
Republic of Perloja	1918–1923	Perloja	Lithuania	In the chaos after World War I, responding to such situation the locals established a self-governing parish committee, often called the Republic of Perloja. The Republic of Perloja had its own court, police, prison, currency (Perloja litas), and an army of 300 men.
Free State of Schwenten	1919	Świętno	Poland	An independent state proclaimed in 1919 with the capital in Schwenten. The declaration of independence had defensive role as local government was aware of the Polish uprising in Greater Poland. It existed for 7 months until it joined Weimar Republic.
Crimean Socialist Soviet Republic	1919	Simferopol	Ukraine	A state allied with Soviet Russia that existed in Crimea for several months in 1919 during the Russian Civil War.
Kodun State	1919	Soorkhe	Russia	Shortlived theocratic state in Buryatia.
Hutsul Republic	1919	Yasinia	Ukraine	A state formed from territory in the former Lands of the Crown of Saint Stephen, it was invaded by the Hungarian Soviet Republic in June 1919 and then became part of the First Czechoslovak Republic. It originally intended to join the Western Ukrainian National Republic.
Bavarian Soviet Republic and Bremen Soviet Republic	1919	Munich	Germany	The Bavarian Soviet Republic, also known as the Munich Soviet Republic was, as part of the German Revolution of 1918–1919, the attempt to establish a socialist state in the form of a democratic workers' council republic in the Free State of Bavaria. It lasted four weeks. Another Republic that also existed for four weeks was the Bremen Soviet Republic.
Slovak Soviet Republic	1919	Prešov	Slovakia	A pro-Hungarian puppet state set up by Red Guards from the Hungarian Soviet Republic in Upper Hungary. It lasted three weeks. After a brief war it was returned to the authority of Czechoslovakia as promised by early peace agreements.
Republic of Prekmurje	1919	Murska Sobota	Slovenia	Existed for six days.
Socialist Soviet Republic of Byelorussia	1919	Minsk	Belarus	An early republic in the historical territory of Belarus for only one month in 1919 after the collapse of the Russian Empire as a result of the October Revolution.
Chyhyryn Soviet Republic	1919	Chyhyryn	Ukraine	Unrecognised Soviet state during the Ukrainian War of Independence.
Steppe-Badzheyskaya Republic	1919	Stepnoy Badzhey	Russia	Established by anti-White insurgents in Yenisei Governorate during the Russian Civil War.
Monarchy of the North	1919	Porto	Portugal	A stated that established by monarchists trying to restore the monarchy. It was crushed by the Portuguese Army.
Ukrainian Soviet Socialist Republic	1919	Kharkiv, Kyiv	Ukraine	The Soviet Republic Ukrainian SSR existed from 1919 to 1991. It was not until 1945 when it was officially recognized as a founding member of the United Nations. It was created as another puppet state of the Soviet Russia. With the fall of the Soviet Union transitioned to Ukraine.
Mughan Soviet Republic	1919	Lankaran	Azerbaijan	The Mughan Soviet Republic was a short-lived pro-Bolshevik state that existed in present-day southeastern Azerbaijan from March to June 1919.
Italian Regency of Carnaro	1919–1920	Rijeka	Croatia	A self-proclaimed state in the city of Fiume (now Rijeka, Croatia) led by Gabriele d'Annunzio between 1919 and 1920.
North Caucasian Emirate	1919–1920	Vedeno	Russia	A mainly Avar and Chechen Islamic state that existed in the territory of Chechnya and western Dagestan during the Russian Civil War from September 1919 to March 1920. The emirate's temporary capital was established in the village of Vedeno and its leader, Uzun Hajji Saltinsky (Узун-Хаджи), was given the title "His Majesty the Imam and the Emir of the North Caucasus Emirate, Sheikh Uzun Khair Haji Khan (Узун Хаир Хаджи Хан)".
Republic of North Ingria	1919–1920	Kirjasalo	Russia	The Republic of North Ingria was a state of Ingrian Finns in the southern part of the Karelian Isthmus, which seceded from Bolshevist Russia after the October Revolution. Its aim was to be incorporated into Finland. It ruled parts of Ingria from 1919 until 1920. With the Peace Treaty of Tartu it was re-integrated into Russia. Established January 23, 1919. Disestablished December 5, 1920.
Republic of Uhtua	1919–1920	Kalevala	Russia	The Republic of Uhtua (or the Republic of East Karelia) was an unrecognized state, with the focus of a state led by Finns. It existed from 1919 to 1920, created out of five Volosts in the Kemsky uyezd of the Arkhangelsk Governorate, now in the Republic of Karelia. The capital of the republic was the village of Uhtua (now Kalevala).
Independent Medvyn Republic	1919–1921	Medvyn	Ukraine	Established during the Ukrainian War of Independence.
Kholodny Yar Republic	1919–1922	Melnyky	Ukraine	A self-proclaimed state formation, partisan movement, which ran on part of the lands of the former Ukrainian People's Republic (UPR — or Ukrainian National Republic, UNR), in the Chyhyryn district of the Kyiv province (modern Cherkasy Oblast), in the area of the Kholodny Yar forest tract. The village of Melnyky was its capital. It had a 15,000-strong army composed of peasants and soldiers from the UNR army, which was defeated by the White Army in Podolia earlier.
Mliev Republic	1919–1922	Mliev	Ukraine	Established during the Ukrainian War of Independence.
(Republic of Ireland) Irish Republic	1919–1922	Dublin	Ireland and United Kingdom	An unrecognized Irish nationalist state during the Irish War for Independence it ceased to exist following the Anglo-Irish Treaty which gave Southern Ireland independence as the Irish Free State while keeping Northern Ireland under British control. These terms caused much of the victorious Irish Republican Army to reject the treaty, leading to the Irish Civil War (1922–1923) between pro-treaty Free State forces and Anti-Treaty IRA, who viewed the dissolution of the Republic as illegal.
Free State of Bottleneck	1919–1923	Lorch	Germany	A short-lived quasi-state that existed from 10 January 1919 until 25 February 1923. It was formed from part of the Prussian province of Hesse-Nassau as a consequence of the occupation of the Rhineland following World War I. The Bottleneck is now part of the German states of Hesse and Rhineland-Palatinate.
Galician Soviet Socialist Republic	1920	Ternopil	Ukraine	The Soviet Republic Galician SSR existed from July 8, 1920, to September 21, 1920, during the Polish-Soviet War within the area of the south-western front of the Red Army.
Olonets Government of Southern Karelia	1920	Olonets	Russia	Merged with the Republic of Uhtua to form the Karelian United Government.
Provisional Polish Revolutionary Committee	1920	Minsk, Vilnius, Białystok	Poland and Belarus	A revolutionary committee created under the patronage of Soviet Russia with the goal to establish a Soviet republic within Poland.
Boyko Soviet Republic	1920	Oporets	Ukraine	Bolshevik state established in Prykarpattia.
Koidanovskaya Independent Republic	1920	Dzyarzhynsk	Belarus	Anti-Bolshevik state established in the Dzyarzhynsk district.
Republic of the Tambov Partisan Region	1920–1921	Tambov	Russia	Formed during the Civil War on the territory of the former Russian Empire, closer to the end of the Tambov Uprising.
Republic of Central Lithuania	1920–1922	Vilnius	Lithuania and Belarus	Was a short-lived puppet republic of Poland, that existed from 1920 to 1922, without an international recognition. It was founded on 12 October 1920, after Żeligowski's Mutiny, when soldiers of the Polish Army, mainly the 1st Lithuanian–Belarusian Infantry Division under Lucjan Żeligowski, fully supported by the Polish air force, cavalry and artillery, attacked Lithuania. It was incorporated into Poland on 18 April 1922.
Socialist Soviet Republic of Armenia	1920–1922	Yerevan	Armenia	Succeeded the First Republic of Armenia.
Azerbaijan Socialist Soviet Republic	1920–1922	Baku	Azerbaijan	Succeeded the Azerbaijan Democratic Republic.
Karelian United Government	1920–1923	Kalevala	Russia	Attempt at establishing an independent Karelia.
Karelian Labor Commune	1920–1923	Petrozavodsk	Russia	Bolshevik counter to the Karelian United Government.
Lajtabánság	1921	Oberwart	Austria and Hungary	State declared in the Burgenland state of Austria by ethnic Hungarians following the Treaty of Trianon, where Hungary was forced to surrender the territory. It was ceased to exist after a month when Austria annexed it.
Labin Republic	1921	Labin	Croatia	Republic established in Labin, Croatia.
Serbian-Hungarian Baranya-Baja Republic	1921	Pécs	Hungary and Croatia	Set up by Hungarian communists fleeing the white terror following the collapse of the Hungarian Soviet Republic. It was supported by the Kingdom of Serbs, Croats and Slovenes but was quickly re-conquered by Hungary.
Republic of Mirdita	1921	Prizren	Albania	Set up by Albanian Catholics trying to break away from Albania which was a mainly Muslim country. It was backed by Yugoslavia but only lasted three months.
Republic of Mountainous Armenia	1921	Goris	Armenia and Azerbaijan	An anti-Soviet Armenian state which existed from 26 April until 13 July 1921, roughly corresponding with the territory that is now the present-day Armenian provinces of Vayots Dzor and Syunik, and some parts of the present-day Azerbaijan.
Socialist Soviet Republic of Abkhazia	1921–1922	Sukhumi	Abkhazia	Succeeded by the Abkhaz Autonomous Soviet Socialist Republic.
Socialist Soviet Republic of Georgia	1921–1922	Tbilisi	Georgia	Succeeded the Democratic Republic of Georgia.
Life and Labor Commune	1921–1939	Moscow, Novokuznetsk	Russia	Tolstoyan agricultural commune founded near Moscow and later moved to Novokuznetsk.
Soviet Union	1922–1933	Moscow	Post-Soviet states except for Moldova, Lithuania, Latvia, and Estonia	The Soviet Union was not recognised by multiple Western states until 1933 and joined the League of Nations the following year.
Autonomous Palatinate	1924	Speyer	Germany	A Palatine separatist state founded around the same time of the separatist fervor in the Rhineland by Franz Josef Heinz. The state was brought down by the Bavarian anti-separatist Viking League who assassinated Heinz and perpetrated multiple massacres against his supporters.
(Catalonia) Catalan Republic	1931	Barcelona	Spain	Established on April 14 during the events of the proclamation of the Second Spanish Republic. Three days later, it became an autonomous government of Catalonia within Spain, the Generalitat.
Asturias and León	1936–1937	Gijón	Spain	Established during the Spanish Civil War.
Free City of Asch	1938	Aš	Czech Republic	Established during the Sudeten German uprising
Carpatho-Ukraine	1939	Khust	Ukraine	Carpatho-Ukraine was an autonomous region within Czechoslovakia from 30 December 1938 to March 15, 1939. It declared itself an independent republic on March 15, 1939, but was occupied and annexed by Hungary between March 15 and March 18, 1939.
First Slovak Republic	1939–1945	Bratislava	Slovakia	Between 1939 and 1945, First Slovak Republic was a puppet state of Nazi Germany.
(Soviet Union) Estonian Soviet Socialist Republic	1940–1941, 1944–1990/91	Tallinn	Estonia	Occupation largely condemned as illegal by Western governments. Independence restored on May 8, 1990.
(Soviet Union) Latvian Soviet Socialist Republic	1940–1941, 1944–1990/91	Riga	Latvia	Occupation largely condemned as illegal by Western governments. Independence restored on May 4, 1990.
(Soviet Union) Lithuanian Soviet Socialist Republic	1940–1941, 1944–1990/91	Vilnius	Lithuania	Occupation largely condemned as illegal by Western governments. Independence restored on March 11, 1990.
Provisional Popular Revolutionary Government of Chechnya-Ingushetia	1940–1944	Galanchozh	Russia	Attempt at establishing an independent Ciscaucasian state from the Soviet Union with Nazi German support, led by Chechen insurgents Hasan Israilov and Mairbek Sheripov as well as Ingush insurgent Akhmed Khuchbarov.
Ukrainian State Board	1941	Lviv	Ukraine	Proclaimed restoration of Ukrainian statehood by the Organization of Ukrainian Nationalists after the occupation of Lviv by Nazi Germany which immediately suppressed it.
Republic of Užice	1941	Užice	Serbia	Area briefly liberated by Yugoslav partisans after the Invasion of Yugoslavia; it was retaken by the German Army during the First anti-Partisan offensive.
Lokot Autonomy	1941–1942	Lokot	Russia	Established as a Nazi client state during Operation Barbarossa.
Principality of the Pindus	1941–1943	?	Greece	Second attempt at an Aromanian State.
Provisional Popular Revolutionary Government of Chechnya-Ingushetia	1941–1944	Galanchozh	Russia	A provisional government established by Chechen ex-communist intellectual Hasan Israilov during the 1940–1944 insurgency in Chechnya.
Independent State of Croatia	1941–1945	Zagreb	Croatia, Bosnia and Herzegovina	Affiliated with the Third Reich.
Zuyev Republic	1941–1947	Zaskarki	Belarus	An autonomous government in German-occupied Byelorussia during the Second World War. Located near Polotsk, the "republic" was composed primarily of villages inhabited by Old Believers. Its starosta was Mikhail Yevseyevich Zuyev, for whom it was named. A self-defence militia was organised, which 300 people (including women) joined. Approximately 100 people were permanent soldiers. Under the republic, private property was restored and Old Believer churches were reopened. According to the description of an Abwehr officer who visited the republic, the area was heavily militarised; villages were surrounded by barbed wire, and manned bunkers stood at village entrances. The German garrison did not interfere in the government of Zuyev, and, in turn, the republic supplied German soldiers with necessities such as food, hay, and firewood. At this time, the Republic's population was roughly 3,000. The republic also had relations with the National Alliance of Russian Solidarists. By 1943, the Soviet partisans were making major gains. Airplanes from the Red Army were delivering extensive aid. The Zuyev Republic, on the other hand, was receiving decreased amounts of resources from Germany, and in turn more was being demanded. It was necessary on several occasions for Zuyev to negotiate with the partisans. In 1944, the German garrison proposed that the republic be extended, and receive large shipments of military equipment, including artillery. Zuyev refused, by now certain that Soviet rule would return to Byelorussia, and fled westwards. The fate of the Zuyev Republic, save for its dissolution, is shrouded in mystery. According to some accounts, fighting continued until 1947.
(Ukraine) Ukrainian Independent United State	1941–1949	Lviv?	Ukraine and Poland	Territories of Western Ukraine, controlled by Ukrainian Insurgent Army during the World War II.
Bihać Republic	1942–1943	Bihać	Croatia, Bosnia and Herzegovina	Area liberated by Yugoslav partisans before being recaptured by the German Army.
Kolky Republic	1943	Kolky	Ukraine	A small parcel of land centred around the village of Kolky that was seized by the Ukrainian Insurgent Army from the German Occupation. It was soon brutally attacked on both sides by Nazi and Soviet forces that ended in the death of up to 500 villagers.
Belarusian Central Rada	1943–1944	Minsk	Belarus	Puppet administrative body in German-occupied Belarus during World War II. It was established by Nazi Germany within Reichskommissariat Ostland in 1943–44, following requests by collaborationist Belarusian politicians hoping to create a Belarusian state with German support.
(Italy) Italian Social Republic	1943–1945	Salò, Verona, Milan	Italy	German-dominated puppet state under Benito Mussolini, formed in the North of Italy after the Italian King Victor Emmanuel III signed an armistice with the Allies.
Mountain Government	1944	Athens, Viniani	Greece	Established by the National Liberation Front and dominated by the Communist Party of Greece in opposition to both the fascist puppet regime and the exiled monarchy
Free Republic of Vercors	1944	Vassieux-en-Vercors	France	On 3 July 1944, the Free Republic of Vercors was proclaimed, the first democratic territory in France since the beginning of the German occupation in 1940. The republic ceased to exist before the end of the month.
Republic of Alto Monferrato	1944	Nizza Monferrato	Italy	Short lived partisan state existing from September to December 2, 1944. The state came to exist following the political union of two Italian resistance movements based in Nizza Monferrato and Costigliole d'Asti of the southern Montferrat region. Its main territory comprised the towns of Moasca, San Marzano Oliveto, Calamandrana, Mombercelli, Bruno, Bergamasco, and Castelnuovo Belbo.
Republic of Bobbio	1944	Bobbio	Italy	Short lived partisan state centered around the Italian city of Bobbio in Piacenza province. The republic extended for ~90 kilometers, from Val Trebbia to the Oltrepò Pavese.
Republic of Carnia	1944	Ampezzo	Italy	Shortlived Partisan state around Ampezzo.
Ossola Partisan Republic	1944	Ossola	Italy	The Ossola Republic was a partisan republic that was established in northern Italy on September 10, 1944 and recaptured by the fascists on October 23, 1944. Unlike other partisan republics, the Ossola Republic was able, in little more than a month of existence, to cope not only with the contingencies imposed by the state of war, but also to give itself an articulate organization, with the establishment of the Provisional Government Council of Domodossola and the liberated zone (G.P.G.). During the albeit brief Forty Days of Freedom
Second Republic of Pińczów	1944	Pińczów	Poland	Region in Świętokrzyskie Voivodeship liberated by joint forces of Polish Resistance formations: Home Army, People's Army and Peasants' Battalions, during a period from July to August 1944.
Red Republic of Caulonia	1945	Caulonia	Italy	Shortlived Socialist State.
Free Republic of Schwarzenberg	1945	?	Germany	A term applied to portions of western Saxony that were briefly not occupied by the Allies after the surrender of Nazi Germany on May 8, 1945. These districts of Saxony were thus self-governing for several weeks before occupation under the Soviet Union. After the German surrender, the Saxony districts of Schwarzenberg, Stollberg, and Aue in the Ore Mountains were left unoccupied by Allies for unknown reasons. This led to anti-fascist groups forming local governments in those towns and villages, ending with the area's occupation by Soviet troops on June 24, 1945. There has been speculation as to why neither American nor Soviet troops immediately occupied the area. One explanation is the Soviets and Americans agreed to stop on the banks of the Mulde river. Since there are several rivers with this name, and the Schwarzenberg area lies between them, there may have been some misunderstanding over the agreed boundaries. Another possible explanation is that the Allies simply overlooked the area until the lack of occupation was noticed.
East Germany	1949–1972	East Berlin	Germany	Both East and West Germany were established in 1949 and claimed to the exclusive mandate over all of Germany. The Hallstein Doctrine prevented states which recognised East Germany to establish diplomatic relationships with West Germany. The Ostpolitik and Basic Treaty, 1972 started mutual recognition and both were accepted as members of the United Nations in 1973 with the Resolution 335.
West Germany	1949–1972	Bonn	Germany	Controlled West Berlin, a walled enclave within the city of Berlin.
Republic of Sbarre Centrali	1970–1971	Reggio Calabria	Italy	During the Years of Lead, backlash following the decision to make Catanzaro the capital of Calabria led to a brief neo-fascist takeover of Reggio Calabria.
Autonomous Turkish Cypriot Administration	1974–1975	North Nicosia	Northern Cyprus	De facto administration established by the Turkish Cypriots in present-day Northern Cyprus immediately after the Turkish invasion of Cyprus in 1974.
Turkish Federated State of Cyprus	1975–1983	North Nicosia	Northern Cyprus	Succeeded by the Turkish Republic of Northern Cyprus.
Gagauz Republic	1989–1995	Comrat	Moldova	The Gagauz people were in general uncomfortable with the potential unification between Moldova and Romania. Thus, the Gagauz Republic declared itself as separate from Moldova. It was later reintegrated into Moldova as an autonomous region in 1995.
Pridnestrovian Moldavian Soviet Socialist Republic	1990–1992	Tiraspol	Transnistria	Created In 1990 by pro-Soviet separatists who hoped to remain within the Soviet Union when it became clear that the MSSR would achieve independence from the USSR and possibly unite with Romania. The PMSSR was never recognised as a Soviet republic by the authorities in either Moscow or Chișinău. In 1991, the Pridnestrovian Moldavian Republic succeeded the Pridnestrovian Moldavian Soviet Socialist Republic.
Tatar Soviet Socialist Republic, later Republic of Tatarstan	1990–2002	Kazan	Russia	On August 30, 1990, Tatarstan declared its sovereignty with the Declaration on the State Sovereignty of the Tatar Soviet Socialist Republic and in 1992 Tatarstan held a referendum on the new constitution. Some 62% of those who took part voted in favor of the constitution. In the 1992 Tatarstan Constitution, Tatarstan is defined as a Sovereign State. However, the referendum and constitution were declared unconstitutional by the Russian Constitutional Court. Articles 1 and 3 of the Constitution as introduced in 2002 define Tatarstan as a part of the Russian Federation, removing the "sovereignty" term.
Dubrovnik Republic	1991–1992	Dubrovnik, Cavtat	Croatia	Suppressed by Croatia.
SAO Romanija	1991–1992	Pale	Bosnia and Herzegovina	Self-proclaimed Serbian Autonomous Oblast within today's Bosnia and Herzegovina. It was declared in the majority Serb municipalities during the prelude of the Bosnian War.
Republic of Vevčani	1991–1993	Vevčani	North Macedonia	Originally declared in opposition to Yugoslav communist government water policies, now a symbolic micronation.
Republic of Serbian Krajina	1991–1995	Knin	Croatia	Suppressed by Croatia.
Republic of Kosova	1991–1999	Pristina	Kosovo	After United Nations Interim Administration Mission in Kosovo became the republic of Kosovo.
Chechen Republic of Ichkeria	1991–2000	Grozny	Russia	De facto recognized only by Georgia and Afghanistan, resisted post-Soviet Russian expansion during the First and Second Chechen Wars.
Republic of Artsakh	1991–2023	Stepanakert	Azerbaijan	Declared independence in 1991 and de facto acquired it after the First Nagorno-Karabakh War of 1988–1994, backed by Armenia, but was unrecognized by the international community. Lost part of its territory in 2020 due to the Second Nagorno-Karabakh War and was ultimately taken over by Azerbaijan in a 2023 military offensive, with its government going into exile.
Armenia	1991–2025	Yerevan	Armenia	Not recognised by Pakistan until 2025.
Kurdish Republic of Laçin	1992	Lachin	Azerbaijan	Declared by Kurds in Azerbaijan during the First Nagorno-Karabakh War
Republic of Tatarstan	1992–1994	Kazan	Russia	Now part of Russia.
Republika Srpska	1992–1995	Pale	Bosnia and Herzegovina	Transformed into an entity of Bosnia and Herzegovina, covering 50% of the land with 90%+ ethnic Serbs.
Republic of Crimea	1992–1995	?	Ukraine	Rejoined Ukraine to become Autonomous Republic of Crimea.
Croatian Republic of Herzeg-Bosnia	1992–1996	Mostar	Bosnia and Herzegovina	Suppressed by Bosnia and Herzegovina.
Talysh-Mughan Autonomous Republic	1993	Lankaran	Azerbaijan	Short-lived attempt at autonomy.
Republic of Western Bosnia	1993–1995	Velika Kladuša	Bosnia and Herzegovina	The Autonomous Province of Western Bosnia, existed during the Bosnian War. Its leader was later convicted of war crimes.
Eastern Slavonia, Baranja and Western Syrmia	1995–1998	Vukovar	Croatia	The UN gives Eastern Slavonia, Baranja and Western Syrmia to Croatia.
Islamic Djamaat of Dagestan	1998–1999	Kadar	Russia	Declared Wahhabist State declared independence in 1998.
Tatarstan	2008	Kazan	Russia	Declared in response to the recognition of Abkhazia and South Ossetia by Russia.
Republic of Crimea	2014	Simferopol	Ukraine	As part of the Annexation of Crimea by the Russian Federation, on 17 March 2014 following the official announcement of the Crimean status referendum results, the Supreme Council of Crimea declared the formal independence of the Republic of Crimea, comprising the territories of both the Autonomous Republic of Crimea and the city of Sevastopol. Russia officially recognised the Republic of Crimea 'as a sovereign and independent state' by decree before approving the admission of Crimea and Sevastopol as federal subjects of Russia.
Donetsk People's Republic	2014–2022	Donetsk	Ukraine	The Donetsk People's Republic existed during the Russo-Ukrainian War, from 7 April 2014 until 30 September 2022, when Vladimir Putin announced its annexation. During its existence, it was designated as a terrorist organisation by Ukraine.
Luhansk People's Republic	2014–2022	Luhansk	Ukraine	The Luhansk People's Republic existed during the Russo-Ukrainian War, from 27 April 2014 until 30 September 2022, when Vladimir Putin announced its annexation. During its existence, it was designated as a terrorist organisation by Ukraine.
Republic of Stakhanov	2015	Kadiivka	Ukraine	Anti-Minsk agreements quasi-state declared within the Luhansk People's Republic.
Kherson State	2022	Kherson	Ukraine	Ruled by the Kherson Military-Civilian Administration, it existed from 28 September until 29 September, when it was admitted as a federal subject of Russia. Its brief independence was confirmed by presidential decree.
Zaporizhzhia State	2022	Melitopol	Ukraine	Ruled by the Zaporizhzhia Military-Civilian Administration, it existed from 28 September until 29 September, when it was admitted as a federal subject of Russia. Its brief independence was confirmed by presidential decree.
Goyce Zengezur Turkish Republic	2022	?	Azerbaijan	The Goyce-Zengezur Turkish Republic was a short-lived, self-proclaimed state declared in 2022 in Southern Armenia region, aiming to establish Turkish governance.

== Oceania ==
Name	Date	Capital	Now part of	Notes
Norfolk Island	1826–1827, 1830, 1834, 1842, 1846	Kingston	Australia	A series of revolts which saw rebels capture Norfolk Island, all were unsuccessful.
United Tribes of New Zealand	1835–1840	Waitangi	New Zealand	Independence declared by British Resident James Busby and northern Māori tribal leaders as an attempt to safeguard British claims against French territorial expansion. Led to a formal treaty (the Treaty of Waitangi) between Māori leaders and the British crown in 1840.
Kingdom of Fiji	1852–1871	Levuka	Fiji	Created by Fijian chief Seru Cakobau, who styled himself the king of Fiji. His claim was not recognized by the other chiefs of Fiji, leading to almost 20 years of warfare until Cakobau finally succeeded in unifying the island.
Kingdom of Easter Island	1868–1876	Anakena	Chile	Formed by French sailor Jean-Baptiste Dutrou-Bornier, who bought up much of the severely depopulated Easter Island, and declared his indigenous wife to be its Queen. The kingdom ceased to exist after Dutrou-Bornier's death, with a remaining population of only 111 people.
Kingdom of Bora Bora	1888–1895	Nunue, Vaitape	France	A Polynesian kingdom that resisted the French annexation of the Leeward Islands. Unlike in Raiatea and Huahine, Bora Bora remained officially neutral, but due to the war in the rest of the Leewards Islands, the French were not able to take control over the kingdom until 1895.
Kingdom of Raiatea–Tahaa	1888–1897	Uturoa	France	A Polynesian kingdom that resisted the French annexation of the Leeward Islands. The King of Raiatea, Tamatoa VI, requested a French protectorate, but many of the lesser chiefs refused to comply with French authority and deposed Tamatoa. This led to a resistance government being set up with Queen Tuarii installed on the throne.
Kingdom of Rapa Nui	1888–1914	Anakena	Chile	An independence movement in Rapa Nui (Easter Island). Due to a misunderstanding in the Chilean treaty of annexation, the islanders believed they retained their sovereignty. King Riro Kāinga attempted to negotiate the island's continued sovereignty with Chile, but died under mysterious circumstances. Several other Rapa Nuians declared themselves kings, such as Enrique Ika, Moisés Tuʻu Hereveri, and María Angata.
Independent Commune of Franceville	1889–1890	Franceville	Vanuatu	Its independence guaranteed by France, this community of Melanesian natives and European settlers experimented with universal suffrage until France and Britain intervened in the New Hebrides.
Republic of West Papua	1961–1962, 1971, 1988	Jayapura	Indonesia	Many West Papuans demanded a new referendum on the region's status because only around 1,000 of almost 1 million Papuans were consulted in the Act of Free Choice, when West Papua was absorbed into Indonesia. Both West Papuan insurgents and Indonesian military have committed acts of violence against civilians, including an incident in the late 1960s where Indonesian personnel forced 50 men to dig their own grave before killing them.
State of Vemerana	1980	Luganville	Vanuatu	Lasted about 12 weeks. The rebels blockaded Santo-Pekoa International Airport, destroyed two bridges, and declared the independence of Espiritu Santo island as the "State of Vemerana".
Republic of Rotuma	1987–1988	Ituʻtiʻu	Fiji	Shortly after the September 1987 Fijian coup a Rotuman man named Henry Gibson declared to the newspapers the declaration of independence of the island of Rotuma citing human rights violations by the military-backed regime and the lack of representation of the Rotuman people in Fijian politics. However a small contingent of soldiers arrested Gibson and his fellow protestors and the separatists were charged with sedition.
(Autonomous Region of Bougainville) Bougainville Interim Government	1990–1998	Buka, Arawa	Papua New Guinea	Signed a peace deal with Papua New Guinea giving the island autonomy pending an independence referendum within a decade.

== See also ==
- List of states with limited recognition
- List of former sovereign states
- List of historical separatist movements
- List of short-lived states and dependencies
- List of micronations
