= State of Franche-Comté =

The State of Franche-Comté was a short-lived state which existed from January 27 to June 6, 1814, created at the fall of the French Empire as a buffer state between France and Germany. It was headed by a governor general named Conrad Karl Friedrich von Andlau-Birseck known as the "baron of Andlaw". Its capital was at Vesoul.

The State of Franche-Comté was dissolved following the Treaty of Paris (1814). Most of its territories were restored to France, although the Principality of Porrentruy continued to be governed by von Andlau-Birseck until it was transferred to the Swiss Confederation in 1815.
