= Ruling clique =

A ruling clique is a clique of people who jointly rule an oligarchic form of government.

Ruling cliques which secure positions of power or leadership tend to form organized groups. Members of the clique may shape a balance of power between them, but some of them may seek greater influence over the others. Ruling cliques in general tend to create autocratic political systems.

== Distinctions ==
Ruling cliques generally differ from another type of oligarchy: a military junta. Military juntas are always ruled by military personnel (often high-ranking like general). A ruling clique is typically formed by people from various professions, who, once in positions of power or leadership, tend to form councils, a political party, or perhaps some other form of organized group. Members of such a grouping may share a rough balance of power, although this may shift as members seek greater influence, often at the expense of others. Ruling cliques tend to reduce accountability within the governing elite, thereby steering the established political system towards one that is more autocratic, rather than democratic, in nature.

== Dangers ==
The danger of ruling cliques stems from the inherent self-interest of any informally organised system of political governance.

This point is captured by George Orwell in the following quote, taken back from his 1943 work Looking Back on the Spanish War:

“Nazi theory indeed specifically denies that such a thing as "the truth" exists. […] The implied objective of this line of thought is a nightmare world in which the Leader, or some ruling clique, controls not only the future but the past. If the Leader says of such and such an event, "It never happened"—well, it never happened. If he says that two and two are five—well, two and two are five. This prospect frightens me much more than bombs […]”

This idea of cliques changing how people think about reality was the inspiration for Orwell's great novel about authoritarian oppression, Nineteen Eighty-Four.

== Types of cliques ==
Some ruling cliques could be considered a form of aristocracy, while others are based on a very small circle of rulers rather than a broader based organization such as a political party.

In the former cases, the clique is a wide group or caste of the aristocracy, as existed in India in the 18th century.

In the latter cases, the entire ruling clique is composed of a council of leaders who are the only members of the clique, and are only a small subset of the aristocracy, as what happened in the Marcos regime in the latter 20th century in the Philippines. A fictional small clique of ruling pigs is featured in Animal Farm.
