= Heavenly Kingdom of Everlasting Satisfaction =

Chinese secret society (c. 1990–92)

Heavenly Kingdom of Everlasting Satisfaction 万顺天国
- 1990–1992
- Status: Unrecognized state
- Capital: Intended capital: Xi'an; Based in: China Henan Province, Song County, Louyang
- Religion: 安民党
- Government: Theocracy
- Historical era: Contemporary History
  - Established: 1990
  - Disestablished: April 9th 1992

Population
  - 1992: 16
- Currency: Yuan (Yuan)
- Time zone: UTC+8
- Today part of: China

The Heavenly Kingdom of Everlasting Satisfaction refers to a secret society founded in 1990 in Song County, Henan Province, headed by Li Chengfu (1952–1993), that wanted to take over the world.

== History ==
=== Establishment ===
On January 27, 1990 (Chinese New Year), Li Chengfu, a native of Nanzhao County, Henan Province, held a secret enthronement ceremony in a simple palace in Song County, establishing the "Heavenly Kingdom of Everlasting Satisfaction" and the "Wanli Insurrectionary Army", "Anmin Party", formally enthroned as emperor, and crowned his mistress Zhou as the "Mother of the Nation". Li Chengfu warned that in 1995, on the eighth day of the leap month of the lunar calendar, the world would be in chaos and that the troops of the Heavenly Kingdom would seize power by "encircling cities in the countryside", "seize power and prepare to unify the world "and "reclaim the entire land of the Tang dynasty and fight for the establishment of a Heavenly Kingdom in the lands of the former Tang dynasty" by first invading Xi'an, then overthrowing the government of the People's Republic of China, re-establishing the Tang dynasty and restoring the administrative divisions of the Tang dynasty, eventually conquering the whole world. Li Chengfu forced all members to be loyal to the "Ten Thousand Thunders", and if anyone leaked information, they would be "Exterminated".

A secret code word was established so each member could identify themselves.

On February 19, 1992 (the 16th day of January), Li Chengfu ordered all members to go up to the mountains with their belongings to rebuild a temple in Nanchang. In less than a month, the temple was completed, but it suddenly collapsed in a snowstorm. Li Chengfu demanded that the temple be rebuilt again. After the Temple was rebuilt on April 6, in the evening of the same day, Li Chengfu held a coronation ceremony, where he enthroned Wan Yu Zhong as King of Dings and Leader Marshal of the Heavenly Army; Tan Zhen Jun as Right Shoulder and King of the West, and Imperial Historian; Guo Jian Gong as Prime Minister.

=== Demise ===
At the height of the Heavenly Kingdom, there were only sixteen members, including four Communist Party members, in addition to Li Chengfu himself.

On August 16, 1991, the police of Chechun Township Police Station received a report that there was a "True Son of God" with the state name "Wanshun Tianguo". The police station worked on identifying who "Wanshun Tianguo" was. Upon finding evidence of the organization, the police deemed it counter-revolutionary and a terrorist group, putting an undercover agent, codenamed "708", in the group to carry out a secret investigation. After the information was completely collected, on April 8, 1992, Song County Public Security Bureau held an emergency meeting and decided to eliminate "Wanshun Tianguo" that night. At 8:00 p.m., Luoyang City and Song County police began to search and make arrests. At 1:30 a.m. the next day, Li Chengfu and all of his members were arrested by police. Li Chengfu was later sentenced to death. This led to the demise of the Heavenly Kingdom.

After Li Chengfu's arrest, his son Li Yuming is said to have succeeded to the throne, and Zhou was honored as the Empress Dowager. She was soon arrested after being discovered by the police for conducting a census.

== See also ==
- Taiping Heavenly Kingdom
- Secret society
- Heterodox teachings (Chinese law)
