= List of former sovereign states =

A historical sovereign state is a state that once existed, but has since been dissolved due to conflict, war, rebellion, annexation, or uprising. This page lists sovereign states, countries, nations, or empires that ceased to exist as political entities sometime after 1453, grouped geographically and by constitutional nature. (Note: The asserted sovereignty of some states listed here was generally unrecognized; the list of historical unrecognized states and dependencies article may contain further information regarding such states.)

== Criteria for inclusion ==
The criteria for inclusion in this list are similar to that of the list of states with limited recognition. To be included here, a polity must have claimed statehood and either:

- had de facto control over a territory, a population, a government, a capacity to enter into relations with other states, or
- have been recognised as a state by at least one other state.

This is not a list for all variant governments of a state, nor is it a list of variations of countries' official long form name. For purposes of this list, the cutoff between medieval and early modern states is the fall of Constantinople in 1453.

== Ancient and medieval states ==
- List of Copper Age states
- List of Bronze Age states
- List of Iron Age states
- List of Classical Age states
- List of states during Late Antiquity
- List of states during the Middle Ages

== Modern states and territories by geography ==
=== Africa ===
==== Morocco (Maghreb al-Aqsa) ====
- Marinid Sultanate (1244–1465)
- Principality of Marrakesh (1359–1526)
- Azemmour (c. 1370–1486/1513)
- Anfa (c. 15th century–1468)
- Principality of Debdou (1430–1563)
- Sharifian Republic (1465–1471)
- Wattasid Sultanate (1472–1549)
- Saadi Sultanate (1510–1649)
- Naqsid Principality of Tétouan (1597–1673)
- Kingdom of Tazeroualt (c. 17th century – c. 20th century)
- Republic of Salé (1627–1668)
- Zawiya Dila'iya (1637–1668)
- Sharifian Sultanate (1666–1912)
- Zaian Confederation (1914–1921)
- Republic of the Rif (1921–1926)

==== Egypt, Sudan and Libya ====
- Makuria (c. 5th century–1518)
- Alodia (c. 6th century–1504)
- Kingdom of al-Abwab (c. 13th century – c. 15–16th century)
- Emirate of Banu Talis (1228–1551)
- Mamluk Sultanate (1250–1517)
- Shilluk Kingdom (c. 15th century–1861)
- Tunjur Kingdom (c. 1400 – c. 1650)
- Kingdom of Fazughli (c. 1500–1685)
- Sultanate of Sennar (1504–1821)
- Egypt Eyalet (1517–1867)
- Fezzan Sultanate (1550–1812)
- Sultanate of Darfur (1603–1874/1898–1916)
- Taqali (1750–1969)
- Sanusi Order (1837–1932)
- Mahdist State (1885–1899)
- Tripolitanian Republic (1918–1922)
- Sultanate of Mit Ghamr (1919)
- Kingdom of Egypt (1922–1953)
- Emirate of Cyrenaica (1949–1951)
- United Arab Republic (1958–1971)
- Libyan Arab Republic (1969–1977)
- Great Socialist People's Libyan Arab Jamahiriya (1977–2011)
- Emirate of Imbaba (1989–1992)

==== Algeria and Tunisia (Central Maghreb) ====
- Mozabite Pentapolis (1012–1882)
- Dhouaouda (1179–1541)
- Hafsid Sultanate (1229–1574)
- Kingdom of Tlemcen (1235–1556)
- Hafsid Emirate of Béjaïa (1285–1510)
- Sultanate of Tuggurt (1414–1871)
- Kingdom of Beni Abbas (1510–1871)
- Kingdom of Kuku (1515–1638)
- Regency of Algiers (1516–1830)
- Beylik of Constantine (1528–1837)
- Beylik of Tunis (1705–1881)
- Kel Ahaggar (1750–1977)
- Emirate of Mascara (1832–1847)

==== Comoro Islands ====
- Sultanate of Badgini (c. 1400–1886)
- Sultanate of Bambao (c. 1400–1886)
- Sultanate of Itsandra (c. 1400–1886)
- Sultanate of Ndzuwani (c. 15th century–1912)
- Sultanate of Mwali (c. 19th century–1912)
- State of the Comoros (1976–1978)
- State of Mohéli (1997–1998)
- State of Anjouan (1997–2002, 2007–2008)

==== Madagascar ====
- Kingdom of Imerina (1540–1897)
- Sakalava empire (c. 1600–1902)
- Kingdom of Antankarana (c. 1614–1843/1895)
- Kingdom of Menabe (c. 1685–1834)
- Kingdom of Boina (c. 1690–1840)
- Kingdom of Tamatave (1712–1828)
- Kingdom of Antongil (1773–1786)
- Kingdom of Tanibe (1822–1828)

==== Horn of Africa ====
- Sultanate of Mogadishu (c. 10th century – c. 16th century)
- Hadiya Sultanate (c. 13th century – c. 15th century)
- Ajuran Sultanate (c. 13–14th century – c. 17th century)
- Welayta Kingdom (c. 1251–1896)
- Ethiopian Empire (1270–1974)
- Ennarea (c. 14th century – c. 1710)
- Kingdom of Kaffa (c. 1390–1897)
- Kingdom of Janjero (c. 15th century–1894)
- Majeerteen Sultanate ((c. 15–16th century–1927)
- Adal Sultanate (1415–1559)
- Imamate of Aussa (1577–1734)
- Warsangali Sultanate (1613–1920)
- Emirate of Harar (1647–1887)
- Sultanate of the Geledi (1695–1911)
- Aussa Sultanate (1734–1936)
- Isaaq Sultanate (1750–1884)
- Habr Yunis Sultanate (c. 1769–1907)
- Kingdom of Gumma (c. 1770–1902)
- Kingdom of Gomma (c. 1780–1886)
- Kingdom of Jimma (1790–1932)
- Kingdom of Limmu-Ennarea (1801–1891)
- Kingdom of Gera (1835–1887)
- Sultanate of Hobyo (1878–1927)
- Dervish State (1899–1920)
- Western Galla Confederation (1936)
- Puntland (1998–2004)
- Jubaland (1998–2001)
- Islamic Courts Union (2006)
- Maakhir (2007–2009)
- Republic of Azania (2011–2013)
- North East State (2023–2025)
- South West State (2026)

==== Western Africa ====
- Kingdom of Nri (c. 9th century–1911)
- Mossi States (c. 11th century–1897)
  - Bilanga (c. 11th century–1897)
  - Con (c. 11–13th century–1896)
  - Macakoali (c. 11th century–1897)
  - Piela (c. 11th century–1897)
  - Tenkodogo (c. 1120–1897)
  - Bilayanga (1182–1897)
  - Wogodogo (c. 1182–1897)
  - Nungu (1204–1895)
  - Yatenga (c. 15th century–1895)
  - Bongandini (c. 16th century–1897)
  - Gwiriko Kingdom (1714–1897)
  - Liptako (1718–1897, fully disestablished 1963)
  - Gurunsi (c. 1870–1899)
- Bonoman (c. 11th century – c. 20th century)
- Kingdom of Benin (1180–1897)
- Mali Empire (c. 1230–1672)
- Kingdom of Dagbon (c. 1250 – c. 1899)
- Mankessim Kingdom (1252–1844)
- Kingdom of Waalo (1287–1855)
- Oyo Empire (c. 1300–1896)
- Songhai Empire (c. 1340–1591)
- Jolof Empire (1350–1549)
- Bornu Empire (c. 1380–1893)
- Sultanate of Agadez (1449–1900)
- Kingdom of Gyaman (c. 1450–1895)
- Kingdom of Baguirmi (1480/1522–1897)
- Empire of Great Fulo (1490–1776)
- Kingdom of Saloum (1494–1864, fully disestablished 1969)
- Denkyira (c. 16th century–1701)
- Fante Confederacy (c. 16th century–1873)
- Kwararafa Confederacy (c. 1500 – c. 1840)
- Wadai Empire (1501–1912)
- Kingdom of Sine (c. 1520–1867, fully disestablished 1969)
- Kaabu Empire (1537–1867)
- Kingdom of Cayor (1549–1879)
- Kingdom of Jolof (1549–1875)
- Kingdom of Baol (1555–1895)
- Kingdom of Whydah (c. 1580–1727)
- Emirate of Tagant (1581–1905)
- Pashalik of Timbuktu (1591–1833)
- Emirate of Brakna (c. 17th century–1904)
- Khasso (c. 17th century – c. 19th century)
- Solimana (c. 17th century–1869)
- Kingdom of Dahomey (c. 1600–1904)
- Emirate of Trarza (1640–1902)
- Asante Empire (1670/1701–1902, still exists as a region)
- Aro Confederacy (1690–1902)
- Bundu (1690–1858)
- Kong Empire (1710–1898)
- Ségou Empire (1712–1861)
- Imamate of Futa Jallon (1725–1912)
- Sultanate of Damagaram (1731–1851)
- Imamate of Futa Toro (1776–1859)
- Sokoto Caliphate (1804–1903)
- Caliphate of Hamdullahi (1818–1867)
- Republic of Maryland (1854–1857)
- Zabarma Emirate (1860–1897)
- Toucouleur Empire (1861–1890)
- Wassoulou Empire (1878–1898)
- Republic of Dahomey (1958–1975)
- Republic of Upper Volta (1958–1984)
- Federal Republic of Cameroon (1961–1975)
- Union of African States (1961–1963)
- Niger Delta Republic (1966)
- Biafra (1967–1970)
  - Republic of Benin (1967)
- People's Republic of Benin (1975–1990)
- Democratic Republic of Bakassi (2006)
- Republic of Toumoujagha (2007)
- Independent State of Azawad (2012–2013)

==== African Great Lakes ====
- Kingdom of Busoga (?–1906, still exists as traditional kingdom)
- Kingdom of Rwanda (11th century–1885, fully disestablished 1962)
- Bunyoro-Kitara Kingdom (13th century–1897, still exists as traditional kingdom)
- Kingdom of Buganda (14th century–1894, still exists as traditional kingdom)
- Kingdom of Karagwe (1450–1963)
- Kingdom of Ankole (1478–1901, fully disestablished 1967)
- Kingdom of Burundi (1680–1890/1962–1966)
- Tooro Kingdom (1830–1876, still exists as traditional kingdom)
- Kingdom of Rwenzururu (1962–1982)
- Republic of Martyazo (1972)

==== Eastern Africa ====
- Malindi Kingdom (9th century–15th century)
- Kilwa Sultanate (957–1513)
- Pate Sultanate (1203–1870)
- Kingdom of Maravi (c. 1480–1891)
- Mombasa Sultanate (1502–1887, fully disestablished 1963)
- Sultanate of Zanzibar (pre–1503/4, 1856–1890, 1963–1964)
- Witu Sultanate (c. 1810–1905/1923)
- Sultanate of M'Simbati (1959)
- Republic of Tanganyika (1961–1964)
  - People's Republic of Zanzibar (1964)

==== Central Africa ====
- Anziku Kingdom (?–19th century)
- Kingdom of Kongo (1390–1914)
- Kingdom of Kakongo (pre-13th century–1885)
- Kingdom of Ndongo (16th century–1671)
- Kingdom of Loango (c. 1550 – c. 1883)
- Kingdom of Luba (1585–1889)
- Yaka Kingdom (17th century–18th century)
- Kingdom of Lunda (c. 1600–1887)
- Kasanje Kingdom (1620–1910)
- Kuba Kingdom (1625–1884)
- Kingdom of Matamba (1631–1744)
- Mbunda Kingdom (1700–1914)
- Kazembe Kingdom (c. 1740–1894)
- Chokwe Kingdom (19th century–1930)
- Yeke Kingdom (1856–1891)
- International Association of the Congo (1879–1885)
- Sultanate of Utetera (1860–1894)
- Congo Free State (1885–1908)
- State of Katanga (1960–1963)
- South Kasai (1960–1962)
- People's Republic of the Congo (1964–1966)
- Maquis of Fizi (1967–1986)
- People's Republic of the Congo (1969–1992)
- Republic of Zaire (1971–1997)
- Republic of Cabinda (1975–1976, 1999)
- Central African Empire (1976–1979)
- Republic of Logone (2015–2021)

==== Southern Africa ====
- Kingdom of Mutapa (1430–1760)
- Kingdom of Butua (1450 – c. 1683)
- Lozi Kingdom (17th century – c. 1840, 1864–1899)
- Rozvi Empire (1660–1889)
- Kingdom of Gciriku (1780–1894)
- Mthethwa Empire (c. 1780–1817)
- Graaff-Reinet (1795–1796)
- Swellendam (1795)
- Griqualand West (1813)
- Zulu Kingdom (1816–1897)
- Kingdom of Mthwakazi (1823–1894)
- Gaza Empire (1824–1895)
- Potchefstroom Republic (1830–1838)
- Winburg Republic (1836–1838)
- Ndebele Kingdom (1837–1840)
- Republic of Winburg-Potchefstroom (1838)
- Natalia Republic (1839–1843)
- Andries-Ohringstad Republic (1845–1849)
- Republic of Zoutpansberg (1849–1864)
- South African Republic (Transvaal) [1852–1877, 1881–1902]
- Orange Free State (1854–1902)
- Utrecht Republic (1854–1858)
- Lydenburg Republic (1856–1860)
- Griqualand East (1862–1874)
- Klipdrift Republic (1870–1871)
- Free Republic of Rehoboth (1872–1990)
- State of Goshen (1882–1883)
- Republic of Stellaland (1882–1885)
  - United States of Stellaland (1883–1885)
- Nieuwe Republiek (1884–1888)
- Republic of Upingtonia (1885–1887)
- Klein Vrystaat (1886–1891)
- Union of South Africa (1910–1961)
- Republic of South Africa (1961–1984)
- Rhodesia (1965–1979)
  - Zimbabwe Rhodesia (1979)
- Transkei (1976–1994)
- Bophuthatswana (1977–1994)
- Venda (1979–1994)
- Ciskei (1981–1994)

=== Asia ===
==== Central Asia (Including East Turkestan) ====
- Chagatai Khanate (1225–1680)
- Moghulistan (1347–1462)
- Uzbek Khanate (1428–1471)
- Nogai Horde (1440–1634)
- Kazakh Khanate (1465–1848)
- Khanate of Bukhara (1506–1785)
- Khanate of Khiva (1511–1920)
- Yarkent Khanate (1514–1705)
- Dzungar Khanate (1634–1755)
- Khanate of Kokand (1709–1868)
- Emirate of Bukhara (1785–1873)
- Bukey Horde (1801–1849)
- Kashgar Emirate (1864–1877)
- Xinjiang clique (1911–1944)
- Alash Autonomy (1917–1918)
- Turkestan Autonomy (1917–1918)
- Bukharan People's Soviet Republic (1920–1925)
- Khorezm People's Soviet Republic (1920–1925)
- First East Turkestan Republic (1933–1934)
- Second East Turkestan Republic (1944–1949)

==== East Asia ====
- In China:
  - Great Ming (1368–1644)
  - Great Xi (1643–1647)
  - Southern Ming (1644–1662)
  - Great Shun (1644–1646)
  - Great Qing (1644–1912)
  - Taiping Heavenly Kingdom (1851–1864)
  - Tianjin Provisional Government (1900–1902)
  - Great Han Sichuan Military Government (1911–1912)
  - Beiyang Government (1912–1928)
  - Republic of China (based on mainland China 1912–1949; continued existence on Taiwan since 1949)
  - Empire of China (1915–1916)
  - Constitutional Protection junta (1917–1921)
    - Constitution Protection Region of Southern Fujian (1918–1920)
  - Guangzhou Commune (1927)
  - Hunan Soviet (1927)
  - Hailufeng Soviet (1927)
  - Shanghai Commune (1927)
  - Soviet Zone of China (1927–1949)
  - Jiangxi–Fujian Soviet (1931–1934)
  - Hunan–Hubei–Jiangxi Soviet (1931–1935)
  - Chinese Soviet Republic (1931–1937)
  - People's Revolutionary Government of the Republic of China (1933–1934)
  - East Hebei Autonomous Government (1935–1938)
  - Northwestern Federation of the Chinese Soviet Republic (1935–1936)
  - Revolutionary Government of the Republic of Geledesha (1935–1936)
  - Provisional Government of the Republic of China (1937–1940)
  - Reformed Government of the Republic of China (1937–1940)
  - Shanghai Great Way Government (1937–1938)
  - Reorganized National Government of the Republic of China (1940–1945)
- In Tibet:
  - Kingdom of Bumthang (7th century – 17th century)
  - Tibetan states (1300–1620)
  - Khoshut Khanate (1637–1717)
  - Tibet under Ganden Phodrang government (1644–1720)
  - Tibet (1912–1951)
  - Tibetan People's Republic (1936)
- In Manchuria:
  - Jaxa (1665–1674)
  - Harbin Soviet (1917)
  - Korean People's Association in Manchuria (1929–1931)
  - Manchukuo (1932–1945)
- In Outer Mongolia:
  - Northern Yuan (1368–1635)
  - Bogd Khanate of Mongolia (1911–1924)
  - Mongolian People's Republic (1924–1992)
- In Inner Mongolia:
  - Mengjiang United Autonomous Government (1939–1945)
    - South Chahar Autonomous Government (1937–1939)
  - Inner Mongolian People's Republic (1945)
  - Mongolian Republic of Alxa (1949)
- In Taiwan:
  - Kingdom of Tungning (1661–1683)
  - Republic of Formosa (1895)
- In Tuva:
  - Uryankhay Krai (1914–1921)
  - Tuvan People's Republic (1921–1944)

===== Japanese Archipelago =====
- Ashikaga shogunate (1336–1573)
- Ryukyu Kingdom (1429–1879)
- Azuchi–Momoyama (1568–1600)
- Tokugawa shogunate (1603–1868)
- Empire of Japan (1868–1947)
- Republic of Ezo (1869)
- Allied Occupied Japan (1945–1952)

===== Korean Peninsula =====
- Joseon (1392–1897)
- Korean Empire (1897–1910)
- People's Republic of Korea (1945–1946)
- Provisional Government of the Republic of Korea (1945)
- Provisional People's Committee of North Korea (1946–1947)
- People's Committee of North Korea (1947–1948)
- First Republic of Korea (1948–1960)
- Second Republic of Korea (1960–1961)
- Supreme Council for National Reconstruction (1961–1963)
- Third Republic of Korea (1963–1972)
- Fourth Republic of Korea (1972–1981)
- Fifth Republic of Korea (1981–1988)

==== West Asia ====
===== Afghanistan =====
- Hotak dynasty (1709–1738)
- Durrani Empire (1747–1823)
- Herat State (1793–1863)
- Principality of Kandahar (1818–1856)
- Principality of Kabul (1823–1834)
- Emirate of Afghanistan (1834–1926)
- Kingdom of Afghanistan (1926–1973)
- Saqqawist Afghanistan (1929)
- Republic of Afghanistan (1973–1978)
- Democratic Republic of Afghanistan (1978–1992)
- Islamic Revolutionary State of Afghanistan (c. 1980–1990)
- Islamic Emirate of Kunar (1991)
- Islamic State of Afghanistan (1992–2002)
- First Islamic Emirate of Afghanistan (1996–2001)
- Islamic Emirate of Badakhshan (1996)
- Transitional Islamic State of Afghanistan (2002–2004)
- Islamic Republic of Afghanistan (2004–2021, still recognized as the legitimate government of Afghanistan)

===== Balochistan =====
- Khanate of Kalat (1666–1736, 1747–1749, 1758–1955)
- Durrani Empire (1749–1758)

===== Anatolia =====
- Empire of Trebizond (1204–1461)
- Emirate of Hasankeyf (1232–1524)
- Beylik of Karaman (1250–1487)
- Beylik of Candar (1292–1461)
- Beylik of Alaiye (1293–1471)
- Ottoman Empire (c. 1299–1923)
- Beylik of Bafra (14th century–1460)
- Beylik of Dulkadir (1337–1522)
- Ramadanid Emirate (1352–1608)
- Kara Koyunlu (1374–1468)
- Aq Qoyunlu (1378–1501)
- Republic of Van (1915–1918)
- Erzincan Soviet (1916–1921)
- Iğdır National Republic (1917–1920)
- Kars Republic (1918–1919)
- Oltu Council Government (1919–1920)
- Government of the Grand National Assembly (1920–1923)
- Republic of Ararat (1927–1931)

===== Cyprus =====
- Kingdom of Cyprus (1192–1489)
- (Turkey) Turkish Federated State of Cyprus (1975–1983)

===== Mesopotamia =====
- Kingdom of Kurdistan (1922–1924)
- Hashemite Kingdom of Iraq (1932–1958)
- Arab Federation (1958)
- First Iraqi Republic (1958–1968)
- Ba'athist Iraq (1968–2003)
- Islamic Emirate of Kurdistan (1994–2003)
- Islamic Republic of Qaim (2005)

===== Iran (Persia) =====
- Baduspanids (665–1598)
- Mihrabanid dynasty (1236–1537)
- Afrasiyab dynasty (1349–1504)
- Marashiyan dynasty (1359–1596)
- Kar-Kiya dynasty (1370s–1592)
- Iran-u-Turan (Timurid) (1370–1507)
- The Expansive Realm of Iran (Safavid dynasty) [1501–1736]
- Guarded Domains of Iran (Afsharid dynasty) [1736–1796]
- Guarded Domains of Iran (Zand dynasty) [1751–1794]
- Sublime State of Persia/Iran (1794–1925)
- (Russia) Military Dictatorship of Mughan (1918–1919)
- Azadistan (1920)
- Persian Socialist Soviet Republic (1920–1921)
- Autonomous Government of Khorasan (1921)
- Imperial State of Persia/Iran (1925–1979)
- Azerbaijan People's Government (1945–1946)
- Republic of Mahabad (1946)

===== Levant =====
- Emirate of Mount Lebanon (1516–1842)
- Arab Kingdom of Syria (1920)
- Independent State of Raqqa (1920–1921)
- State of Syria (1925–1930)
- First Syrian Republic (1930–1950)
- Hatay State (1938–1939)
- All-Palestine Government (1948–1967)
- Second Syrian Republic (1950–1958, 1961–1963)
- United Arab Republic (1958–1971)
- Ba'athist Syria (1963–2024)
- Fatahland (1969–1982)
- People's Republic of Tyre (1975)
- East Beirut canton (1976–1990)
- Free Lebanon State (1979–1984)
- Civil Administration of the Mountain (1983–1991)
- Islamic Emirate of Rafah (2009)
- Islamic State (2014–2017)

===== Arabian Peninsula =====
- Imamate of Oman (749–1959)
- Kathiri Sultanate in Hadhramaut (14th century–1888)
- Emirate of Dhala (15th century–1904)
- Fadhli Sultanate (15th century–1888)
- Mahra State of Qishn and Socotra (1432–1886)
- Sheikhdom of Kuwait (1613–1961)
- Wahidi Sultanate of Balhaf (1640–1888)
- Wahidi Sultanate of Haban (1640–1895)
- Bani Khalid Emirate (1669–1796)
- Emirate of Beihan (1680–1872)
- Omani Empire (1696–1856)
- Sultanate of Lahej (1728–1839)
- Emirate of Diriyah (1744–1812)
- Sultanate of Upper Yafa (1800–1903)
- Sultanate of Lower Yafa (1800–1895)
- Emirate of Nejd (1812–1891)
- Muscat and Oman (1820–1970)
- Emirate of Jabal Shammar (1836–1921)
- Qu'aiti Sultanate in Hadhramaut (1858–1888)
- Emirate of Riyadh (1902–1913)
- Emirate of Asir (1906–1934)
- Emirate of Nejd and Hasa (1913–1921)
- Sheikdom of Upper Asir (1916–1920)
- Kingdom of Hejaz (1916–1925)
- Sultanate of Tarim (1916–1945)
- Mutawakkilite Kingdom of Yemen (1918–1970)
- Sultanate of Nejd (1921–1925)
- Kingdom of Hejaz and Nejd (1926–1932)
- Federation of South Arabia (1962–1967)
- Yemen Arab Republic (1962–1990)
- People's Democratic Republic of Yemen (1967–1990)
- Republic of Kuwait (1990)
- Democratic Republic of Yemen (1994)

==== South Asia ====
- Jaintia Kingdom (500–1835)
- Laur Kingdom (600–1565)
- Udaipur State (734–1818)
- Garhwal Kingdom (823–1949)
- Kingdom of Cochin (before 12th century AD–1949)
- Manipur Kingdom (1110–1949)
- Sultanate of Maldives (1117–1796, 1954–1968)
- Delhi Sultanate (1206–1526)
- Ahom kingdom (1228–1826)
- Bengal Sultanate (1352–1576)
- Jaunpur Sultanate (1394–1479)
- Kingdom of Mysore (1399–1948)
- Twipra Kingdom (1400–1949)
- Kingdom of Kotte (1412–1597)
- Pratapgarh Kingdom (1489–1700s)
- Bijapur Sultanate (1490–1686)
- Sultanate of Golconda (1518–1687)
- Mughal Empire (1526–1857)
- Sur Empire (1540–1556)
- Kingdom of Sikkim (1642–1975)
- Maratha Confederacy (1674–1820)
- Bengal Subah (1717–1757) (Note: The Nawabs of Bengal ruled the Bengal Subah – a province of the Mughal Empire which pretty much became independent from 1717.)
- Hyderabad State (1724–1798)
- Kingdom of Travancore (1729–1949)
- Sikh Empire (1799–1849)
- Provisional Government of Free India (1943–1945)
- (India) Free Dadra and Nagar Haveli (1954–1961)
- United Suvadive Republic (1959–1963)

==== Southeast Asia ====
- In Cambodia:
  - Kingdom of Cambodia (1431–1863)
  - Kingdom of Kampuchea (1945)
  - First Kingdom of Cambodia (1953–1970)
  - Khmer Republic (1970–1975)
  - Democratic Kampuchea (1975–1979)
  - Liberated Area of Cambodia (1978–1979)
  - People's Republic of Kampuchea (1979–1992)
- In Laos:
  - Kingdom of Luang Phrabang (1707–1893)
  - Kingdom of Vientiane (1707–1828)
  - Kingdom of Champasak (1713–1904)
  - Kingdom of Luang Phrabang (1945)
  - Lao Issara (1945–1946)
  - Kingdom of Laos (1947–1975)
- In Vietnam:
  - Champa Kingdom (192–1832)
  - Đại Việt (968–1407, 1428–1804)
  - Nghệ-Tĩnh Soviet (1930–1931)
  - Empire of Vietnam (1945)
  - Democratic Republic of Vietnam (North Vietnam) (1945–1976)
  - Hòn Gai-Cẩm Phả Commune (1945)
  - Saigon Commune (1945)
  - Republic of Cochinchina (1946–1949)
  - Sip Song Chau Tai (Tai Federation) (1947–1955)
  - Provisional Central Government of Vietnam (1948–1949)
  - State of Vietnam (known as South Vietnam after the Geneva Conference of 1954) (1949–1955)
  - Republic of Vietnam (South Vietnam) (1955–1975)
  - Republic of South Vietnam (1969–1976)
- In Myanmar (Burma):
  - Mon kingdoms (13th–16th, 18th centuries)
  - Hanthawaddy kingdom (1287–1552)
  - Pegu (1287–1539, 1747–1757)
  - Shan States (1287–1922)
  - Arakan (1287–1784)
  - Ava (1364–1555)
  - Kingdom of Mrauk U (1429–1785)
  - Taungoo dynasty (1486–1752, 2nd Empire)
  - Konbaung dynasty (1752–1885, 3rd Empire)
  - State of Burma (1943–1945)
  - Union of Burma (1948–1962)
- In Thailand:
  - Langkasuka (2nd–15th century)
  - Nakhon Si Thammarat Kingdom (13th century–1782)
  - Lan Na (1292–1775)
  - Ayutthaya Kingdom (1350–1767)
  - Sultanate of Pattani (1516–1902)
  - Sultanate of Singora (1605–1680)
  - Thonburi Kingdom (1767–1782)
  - Kingdom of Siam (1782–1932)
  - Kingdom of Chiang Mai (1782–1894)
  - Kingdom of Setul Mambang Segara (1808–1916)
- In Indonesia:
  - Republic of Indonesia (1945–1949) (Note: Partially recognized state existed after WWII)
  - United States of Indonesia (1949–1950)
    - State of East Indonesia (1946–1950)
    - Great Dayak (1946–1950)
    - State of East Sumatra (1947–1950)
    - State of East Java (1948–1950)
    - State of Madura (1948–1950)
    - State of Pasundan (1948–1950)
    - State of South Sumatra (1948–1950)
  - Revolutionary Government of the Republic of Indonesia (1958–1961)
  - In Sumatra:
    - Sultanate of Aceh (1496–1903)
    - Sultanate of Langkat (1568–1946)
    - Sultanate of Deli (1609–1862, fully disestablished 1956)
    - Jambi Sultanate (1615–1904)
    - Palembang Sultanate (1659–1823)
    - Sultanate of Siak Sri Indrapura (1723–1945)
    - Sultanate of Serdang (1723–1946)
  - In Java:
    - Majapahit (1293–1527)
    - Sultanate of Cirebon (1445–1677)
    - Sultanate of Demak (1475–1548)
    - Sultanate of Banten (1527–1813)
    - Kingdom of Pajang (1568–1586)
    - Sultanate of Mataram (1588–1681)
  - In Lesser Sunda Islands
    - Bali Kingdoms (914–1908)
    - Kingdom of Larantuka (1515–1904)
    - Bima Sultanate (1620–1951, fully disestablished 1958)
  - In Sulawesi:
    - Kingdom of Banggai (? – 1907)
    - Sultanate of Gowa (14th century–1911, fully disestablished 1945)
    - Sultanate of Bone (14th century – 1905)
    - Kingdom of Wajoq (c. 1400 – 1906, fully disestablished 1957)
  - In Maluku:
    - Sultanate of Ternate (1257–1914)
    - Sultanate of Tidore (1273–1920)
    - Republic of South Maluku (1950–1963)
  - In Borneo:
    - Kingdom of Kutai Martadipura (399–1635)
    - Berau Sultanate (14th century–1810)
    - Sultanate of Kutai Kartanegara (1300–1844)
    - Bruneian Empire (1368–1888)
    - Sultanate of Banjar (1526–1860)
    - Sambas Sultanate (1609–1819, fully disestablished 1956)
    - Sultanate of Bulungan (1731 – c. 1880, fully disestablished 1964)
    - Pontianak Sultanate (1771–1779)
    - Kengwei Republic (1776–1839)
    - Santiaogou Republic (1776–1854)
    - Lanfang Republic (1777–1884)
    - Lintian Republic (1823–1854)
    - Kingdom of Sarawak (1841–1888)
    - Kalimantan Utara (1962)
  - In Riau Islands:
    - Riau-Lingga Sultanate (1824–1911)
  - In Papua:
    - Republic of West Papua (1971)
- In Malaysia:
  - Kedah Sultanate (1136–1821, 1842–1945)
  - Sultanate of Malacca (1400–1511)
  - Pahang Sultanate (1470–1623)
  - Johor Sultanate (1528–1855)
  - Pahang Kingdom (1770–1881)
  - Malayan Union (1946–1948)
  - Federation of Malaya (1957–1963)
- In the Philippines
  - Sultanate of Sulu (1405–1915)
  - Sultanate of Maguindanao (1500–1888)
  - Sovereign Tagalog Nation (1896–1897)
  - Tejeros Revolutionary Government (1897)
  - Republic of Biak-na-Bato (1897)
  - Republic of Negros (1898–1899)
  - Cantonal Government of Negros (1898–1901)
  - Revolutionary Government of the Philippines (1898)
  - First Philippine Republic (1899–1902)
  - Republic of Zamboanga (1899–1903)
  - Tagalog Republic (1902–1906)
  - Second Philippine Republic (1943–1945)
  - Bangsamoro Republik (2013)

=== Europe ===
==== Nordic countries ====
In the Nordic countries, unions were personal, not unitary

- Schleswig (1058–1864)
- Kalmar Union (1397–1523, intermittent)
- Denmark–Norway (1524–1814, intermittent)
- Kingdom of Norway (1814)
- United Kingdoms of Sweden and Norway (1814–1905)
- Finnish Socialist Workers' Republic (1918–1919)

==== Modern France ====
- Viscounty of Béarn (9th century–1620)
- Kingdom of France (843–1792, 1814/15–1848)
  - Duchy of Burgundy (918–1482)
  - Duchy of Brittany (939–1532)
- Duchy of Lorraine (959–1766)
- County of Foix (1010–1607)
- Kingdom of Corsica (1736)
- (First) Paris Commune (1789–1795)
- Corsican Republic (1755–1769, 1793–1794)
- Anglo-Corsican Kingdom (1794–1796)
- French First Republic (1792–1804)
- French Empire (1804–1814/15, 1852–1870)
  - First French Empire (1804–1814/15)
  - Second French Empire (1852–1870)
- Kingdom of France (1815–1848)
  - Bourbon Restoration (1815–1830)
  - July Monarchy (1830–1848)
- French Second Republic (1848–1852)
- Free Cities of Menton and Roquebrune (1848–1849)
- (Second) Paris Commune (1871)
- Third French Republic (1870–1940)
  - Territory of the Saar Basin (1920–1935)
- Alsace-Lorraine Soviet Republic (1918)
- Vichy France (1940–1944)
- Free Republic of Vercors (1944)
- Fourth French Republic (1946–1958)
  - Saar Protectorate (1946–1956)

==== The German-speaking world ====
- Modern Germany
  - Holy Roman Empire (843–1806)
  - Reuss (1010–1806)
  - Pomerania (1121–1637)
  - Lippe (1123–1871)
  - (Germany) Waldeck (1180–1871)
  - Hamburg (1189–1871)
  - Lübeck (1226–1871)
  - Saxe-Lauenburg (or Duchy of Lauenburg) [1296–1871]
  - Peasant Republic of Dithmarschen (c. 1400–1559)
  - Prussia (1525–1871)
    - Duchy of Prussia (1525–1618)
    - Brandenburg-Prussia (1618–1701)
    - Kingdom of Prussia (1701–1871)
  - Schwarzburg-Rudolstadt (1599–1871)
  - Schwarzburg-Sondershausen (1599–1871)
  - Saxe-Altenburg (1602–1871)
  - Hohenzollern-Hechingen (1623–1850)
  - Hohenzollern-Sigmaringen (1623–1850)
  - Saxe-Gotha (1640–1680)
  - Schaumburg-Lippe (1647–1871)
  - Saxe-Hildburghausen (1680–1826)
  - Saxe-Meiningen (1680–1871)
  - Saxe-Coburg-Saalfeld (1735–1826)
  - Hesse-Kassel (or Hesse-Cassel) [Electorate, 1803–1807, 1813–1866]
  - Duchy of Anhalt (1806–1918)
  - Grand Duchy of Baden (1806–1871)
  - Kingdom of Bavaria (1806–1871)
  - Frankfurt (Free Imperial City of Frankfurt (HRE), before 1806; City of Frankfurt, 1815–1866)
  - Nassau (1806–1866)
  - Saxony (kingdom) [1806–1871]
  - Principality of Reuss-Gera (1806–1918)
  - Confederation of the Rhine (1806–1813)
  - Württemberg (kingdom) [1806–1871]
  - Saxe-Weimar-Eisenach (1809–1871)
  - Grand Duchy of Frankfurt (1810–1813)
  - Kingdom of Hanover (1814–1866)
  - Bremen (1815–1871)
  - Brunswick (1815–1871)
  - German Confederation (1815–1866)
  - Hesse-Homburg (1815–1866)
  - Holstein (1815–1864)
  - Mecklenburg-Schwerin (1815–1871)
  - Mecklenburg-Strelitz (1815–1871)
  - Oldenburg (1815–1871)
  - Saxe-Coburg and Gotha (1826–1871)
  - German Empire (1848–1849)
  - North German Federation (1867–1871)
  - German Empire (1871–1918)
  - Mainz Workers' and Soldiers' Council (1918)
  - Weimar Republic (1918–1933)
  - Bavarian Soviet Republic (1919)
  - Free State of Bottleneck (1919–1923)
  - Nazi Germany (1933–1945)
  - Free Republic of Schwarzenberg (1945)
  - State of Hanover (1946)
  - East Germany (1949–1990)
  - West Germany (1949–1990)
- Austria
  - Duchy of Austria (1156–1453)
  - County of Tyrol (1140–1919)
  - Duchy of Styria (1180–1918)
  - Prince-Archbishopric of Salzburg (1328–1803)
  - Archduchy of Austria (1453–1804, 1867–1918)
  - Austrian Empire (1804–1867)
  - Austria-Hungary (1867–1918)
  - Republic of German-Austria (1918–1919)
  - Republic of Heinzenland (1918)
  - First Austrian Republic (1919–1934)
  - Banate of Leitha (1921)
  - Federal State of Austria (1934–1938)

==== Switzerland ====
- Old Swiss Confederacy (1300–1798)
- Republic of Geneva (1534–1798, 1813–1815)
- Helvetic Republic (1798–1803)
- Valais Republic (1802–1810)

==== Italy ====
- Republic of Venice (697–1797)
- Papal States (752–1870)
- Marquisate of Finale (967–1602)
- Republic of Ancona (c. 1000 – 1532)
- Republic of Genoa (1095–1797)
- Republic of Florence (1115–1569)
- Republic of Siena (1125–1555)
- Kingdom of Sicily (1130–1816)
- Republic of Noli (1192–1797)
- Republic of Lucca (1160–1805)
- Duchy of Mantua (1273–1707)
- Kingdom of Naples (1282–1816)
- Kingdom of Naples (1285–1816)
- Republic of Senarica (1343–1797)
- Duchy of Milan (1395–1797)
- Republic of Cospaia (1440–1826)
- Duchy of Urbino (1443–1625)
- Duchy of Modena (1452–1796, 1815–1859)
- Duchy of Massa and Carrara (1473–1829)
- Sovereign Military Order of Malta (1530–1798)
- Duchy of Parma (1545–1859)
- Grand Duchy of Tuscany (1569–1801, 1815–1859)
- Kingdom of Sardinia (1720–1861)
- Republic of Alba (1796)
- Ligurian Republic (1797–1805)
- (Italy) Transpadane Republic (1796–1797)
- Cispadane Republic (1796–1797)
- Republic of Bergamo (1797)
- Republic of Brescia (1797)
- Provisional Municipality of Venice (1797–1798)
- Anconine Republic (1797–1798)
- Cisalpine Republic (1797–1802)
- Republic of Crema (1797)
- Roman Republic (1798-1799)
- Gozitan Nation (1798–1801)
- Parthenopean Republic (1799)
- Kingdom of Etruria (1801–1807)
- Italian Republic (1802–1805)
- Kingdom of Italy (1805–1814)
- Principality of Lucca and Piombino (1805–1814)
- Principality of Elba (Elba) [1814–1815]
- Kingdom of Lombardy–Venetia (1815–1866)
- Kingdom of the Two Sicilies (1815–1860)
- Duchy of Lucca (1815–1847)
- Kingdom of Tavolara (1836–1934)
- Provisional Government of Milan (1848)
- Republic of San Marco (1848–1849)
- Kingdom of Sicily (1848)
- Roman Republic (1849)
- Tuscan Republic (1849)
- United Provinces of Central Italy (1859–1860)
- Kingdom of Italy (1861–1946)
- Regency of Carnaro (1919–1920)
- Italian Social Republic (1943–1945)
- Italian partisan republics (1944)
  - Republic of Alba
  - Republic of Alto Monferrato
  - Republic of Bobbio
  - Republic of Carnia
  - Republic of Corniolo
  - Free Republic of Forno
  - Free Republic of Ossola
  - Republic of Torriglia
  - Republic of the Taro Valley
- Red Republic of Caulonia (1945)
- Free Territory of Trieste (1947–1954)
- Republic of Rose Island (1968–1969)
- Republic of Sbarre Centrali (1970–1971)

==== Modern United Kingdom ====
- Kingdom of Scotland (843–1707)
- Kingdom of England (927–1707)
- Principality of Wales (1216–1536)
- Commonwealth of England (1649–1653) and (1659–1660)
- The Protectorate (1653–1659)
- Kingdom of Great Britain (1707–1800)
- United Kingdom of Great Britain and Ireland (1801–1922)

==== Ireland ====
- Kingdom of Uí Failghe (?–1550)
- Osraige (150–1541)
- Airgíalla (331–1585)
- Uí Maine (c. 357 – 1611)
- Tyrconnell (5th century–1607)
- Tír Eoghain (5th century–1607)
- Kingdom of Connacht (406–1474)
- Ailech (450–1617)
- Kingdom of Leinster (7th century BC–1603)
- Fermanagh (10th century–1607)
- Magh Luirg (c. 956 – 1585)
- Thomond (1118–1543)
- Kingdom of Desmond (1118–1596)
- Lordship of Ireland (1171–1542)
- Clandeboye (1283–1605)
- Kingdom of Ireland (1541–1801)
- First Earldom of Desmond (1569–1572)
- Second Earldom of Desmond (1579–1582)
- Irish Catholic Confederation (1641–1649)
- Republic of Connacht (1798)
- Irish Soviets (1919–1922)
  - Limerick Soviet (1919)
- Irish Free State (1922–1937)

==== Benelux ====
- Prince-Bishopric of Liège (972–1789, 1791–1795)
- Duchy of Brabant (1183–1794)
- Duchy of Bouillon (1456? – 1794)
- Republic of the Seven United Netherlands (1581–1795)
- Batavian Republic (1795–1806)
- Republic of Liège (1789–1791)
- United Belgian States (1789–1790)
- Kingdom of Holland (1806–1810)
- Sovereign Principality of the United Netherlands (1813–1815)
- United Kingdom of the Netherlands (1815–1839)
- Neutral Moresnet (1816–1920)

==== Iberian countries ====
- Suebi Kingdom of Galicia (409–585)
- Alanic Kingdom of Hispania (409–419)
- Vandalic Kingdom of Hispania (410–430)
- Visigothic Kingdom of Hispania (542–721)
- Duchy of Cantabria (581–768)
- Kingdom of Asturias (718–924)
- County of Sobrarbe (724–1045)
- Emirate of Córdoba (756–929)
- County of Urgel (785–1413)
- County of Barcelona (801–1714)
- County of Aragon (802–1035)
- Kingdom of Pamplona (824–1162)
- County of Castile (850–1065)
- County of Portugal (868–1139)
- County of Pallars (870–1011)
- County of Ribagorza (872–1598)
- Kingdom of León (910–1714)
- Kingdom of Galicia (910–1833)
- Caliphate of Córdoba (929–1031)
- Kingdom of Viguera (970–1030)
- Couto Misto (10th century–1868)
- County of Pallars Jussà (1011–1192)
- County of Pallars Sobirà (1011–1487)
- Kingdom of Castile (1065–1833)
- Principality of Catalonia (12th century – 1714/1833)
- Kingdom of Portugal (1139–1910)
- Kingdom of Navarre (1162–1841)
- Crown of Aragon (1164–1707/1715)
- Crown of Castile (1230–1716)
- Kingdom of Majorca (1231–1715)
- Emirate of Granada (1232–1492)
- Iberian Union (1580–1640)
- First Catalan Republic (1640–1641)
- United Kingdom of Portugal, Brazil and the Algarves (1815–1825)
- Catalan State (1873)
- Kingdom of Portugal (Monarchy of the North) [1919]
- Ditadura Nacional (1926–1933)
- Second Spanish Republic (1931–1939)
- Republic of Galicia (1931)
- Second Catalan Republic (1931)
- Asturian Socialist Republic (October 1934)
- Catalan State (October 1934)
- Revolutionary Catalonia (1936–1937)
- Regional Defence Council of Aragon (1936–1937)
- Francoist Spain (1936–1975)

==== Poland ====
- Duchy of Bytom (1281–1498)
- Duchy of Opole (1281–1532)
- Duchy of Racibórz (1281–1521)
- Duchy of Teschen (1281–1918)
- Duchy of Pomerania-Wolgast (1295–1478)
- Szczecin Principality (1295–1523)
- Duchy of Pomerania-Stolp (1368–1478)
- Duchy of Pomerania (1478–1531, 1625–1637)
- Duchy of Masovia (1495–1526)
- Duchy of Opole and Racibórz (1521–1532, 1551–1556)
- Polish–Lithuanian Commonwealth (1569–1795)
  - Grand Duchy of Lithuania (1236–1795)
  - Crown of the Kingdom of Poland (1386–1795)
  - Royal Prussia (1466–1569)
  - Duchy of Prussia (1525–1657)
  - Duchy of Courland and Semigallia (1561–1795)
- Kingdom of Galicia and Lodomeria (1772–1918, part of the Austrian Empire, later part of Austria-Hungary)
- Duchy of Warsaw (1807–1815; part of First French Empire, personal union with the Kingdom of Saxony)
- Free City of Danzig (1807–1814)
- Free, Independent, and Strictly Neutral City of Cracow with its Territory (1815–1846)
- Kingdom of Poland (1815–1832; personal union with the Russian Empire)
- Grand Duchy of Posen (1815–1848; part of the Kingdom of Prussia)
- Polish National Government (1830–1831)
- Grand Duchy of Kraków (1846–1918; part of Austria-Hungary)
- Polish National Government (1846)
- Republic of Mosina (1848)
- Polish National Government (1863–1864)
- Kingdom of Poland (1917–1918)
- Republic of Zakopane (1918)
- Republic of Ostrów (1918)
- First Republic of Pińczów (1918–1919)
- Republic of Tarnobrzeg (1918–1919)
- Komancza Republic (1918–1919)
- Lemko-Rusyn People's Republic (1918–1920)
- Free State of Schwenten (1919)
- Republic of Gniew (1919–1920)
- Second Polish Republic (1918–1939)
- Republic of Central Lithuania (1920–1922)
- Free City of Danzig (1920–1939)
- Provisional Polish Revolutionary Committee (1920)
- Polish Underground State (1939–1945)
- Second Republic of Pińczów (1944)
- Polish Committee of National Liberation (1944)
- Provisional Government of the Republic of Poland (1944–1945)
- Provisional Government of National Unity (1945–1947)
- Republic of Poland (1947–1952)
- Polish People's Republic (1952–1989)

==== Ukraine ====
- Principality of Novgorod-Seversk (1097–1503)
- Principality of Kiev (1132–1471)
- Zaporozhian Sich (1552–1775)
- Cossack Hetmanate (1649–1764)
- Shuliavka Republic (1905)
- Ukrainian People's Republic (1917–1920)
- Ukrainian State (1918)
- West Ukrainian People's Republic (1918–1919)
- Makhnovshchina (1918–1921)
- Donetsk–Krivoy Rog Soviet Republic (1918)
- Chyhyryn Soviet Republic (1919)
- Kholodny Yar Republic (1919–1922)
- Hutsul Republic (1919)
- Independent Medvyn Republic (1919–1921)
- Ukrainian Soviet Socialist Republic (1919–1991; sovereign until 1922)
- Galician Soviet Socialist Republic (1920)
- Carpatho-Ukraine (1939)
- Ukrainian National Government (1941)
- Donetsk People's Republic (2014–2022)
- Luhansk People's Republic (2014–2022)

==== Crimea ====
- Principality of Theodoro (13th century–1475)
- Crimean Khanate (1449–1783)
- Crimean People's Republic (1917–1918)
- Crimean Regional Government (1918–1919)
- Crimean Autonomous Soviet Socialist Republic (1991–1992)
- Republic of Crimea (2014)

==== Baltic countries and Belarus ====
- Principality of Drutsk (1101–1565)
- State of the Teutonic Order (1230–1525)
- Grand Duchy of Lithuania (1236–1795)
- Kingdom of Livonia (1570–1578)
- Soviet Republic of Naissaar (1917–1918)
- Kingdom of Lithuania (1918)
- Republic of Lithuania (1918–1940)
- Republic of Perloja (1918–1923)
- Belarusian People's Republic (1918–1919)
- Rudabel Republic (1918–1920)
- United Baltic Duchy (1918)
- Latvian Socialist Soviet Republic (1918–1920)
- First Latvian Republic (1918–1940)
- Duchy of Courland and Semigallia (1918)
- Commune of the Working People of Estonia (1918–1919)
- Republic of Estonia (1918–1940)
- Lithuanian–Byelorussian Soviet Socialist Republic (1919)
- Byelorussian Soviet Socialist Republic (1919–1922)
- Republic of Central Lithuania (1920–1922)
- Zuyev Republic (1941–1947)
- Polish National-Territorial Region (1990–1991)

==== Russia ====
- Tsardom of Russia (1547–1721)
- (Russia) Russian Empire (1721–1917)
- (Russia) Russian Republic (1917–1918)
- Russian Soviet Federative Socialist Republic (1917–1922)
- (Russia) Russian State (1918–1920)
- Union of Soviet Socialist Republics (1922–1991)
  - Armenian Soviet Socialist Republic (1920–1991)
  - Azerbaijan Soviet Socialist Republic (1920–1991)
  - Byelorussian Soviet Socialist Republic (1922–1991)
  - Estonian Soviet Socialist Republic (1940–1991)
  - Georgian Soviet Socialist Republic (1921–1991)
  - Karelo-Finnish Soviet Socialist Republic (1940–1956)
  - Kazakh Soviet Socialist Republic (1936–1991)
  - Kirghiz Soviet Socialist Republic (1936–1991)
  - Latvian Soviet Socialist Republic (1940–1990)
  - Lithuanian Soviet Socialist Republic (1940–1990)
  - Moldavian Soviet Socialist Republic (1940–1991)
    - Pridnestrovian Moldavian Soviet Socialist Republic (1990–1991)
  - Russian Soviet Federative Socialist Republic (1922–1991)
    - Turkestan Autonomous Soviet Socialist Republic (1918–1924)
    - Volga German Autonomous Soviet Socialist Republic (1918–1941)
    - Bashkir Autonomous Soviet Socialist Republic (1919–1991)
    - Tatar Autonomous Soviet Socialist Republic (1920–1990)
    - Kazakh Autonomous Socialist Soviet Republic (1920–1936)
    - Mountain Autonomous Soviet Socialist Republic (1921–1924)
    - Dagestan Autonomous Soviet Socialist Republic (1921–1991)
    - Crimean Autonomous Soviet Socialist Republic (1921–1945)
    - Yakut Autonomous Soviet Socialist Republic (1922–1991)
    - Buryat Autonomous Soviet Socialist Republic (1923–1990)
    - Karelian Autonomous Soviet Socialist Republic (1923–1940, 1956–1991)
    - Kirghiz Autonomous Socialist Soviet Republic (1926–1936)
    - Mordovian Autonomous Soviet Socialist Republic (1934–1990)
    - Udmurt Autonomous Soviet Socialist Republic (1934–1990)
    - Kalmyk Autonomous Soviet Socialist Republic (1935–1943, 1957–1991)
    - Checheno-Ingush Autonomous Soviet Socialist Republic (1936–1944, 1957–1991)
    - Kabardino-Balkarian Autonomous Soviet Socialist Republic (1936–1944, 1957–1991)
    - Komi Autonomous Soviet Socialist Republic (1936–1991)
    - Mari Autonomous Soviet Socialist Republic (1936–1991)
    - North Ossetian Autonomous Soviet Socialist Republic (1936–1992)
    - Kabardin Autonomous Soviet Socialist Republic (1944–1957)
    - Tuvan Autonomous Soviet Socialist Republic (1961–1992)
    - Khakas Autonomous Oblast (1990–1991)
    - Gorno-Altai Autonomous Soviet Socialist Republic (1990–1991)
  - Tajik Soviet Socialist Republic (1929–1991)
  - Turkmen Soviet Socialist Republic (1924–1991)
  - Ukrainian Soviet Socialist Republic (1922–1991)
  - Uzbek Soviet Socialist Republic (1924–1991)
    - Karakalpak Autonomous Soviet Socialist Republic (1952–1991)
- In Central Russia:
  - Principality of Smolensk (1054/1125–1404/1508)
  - Principality of Ryazan (1129–1521)
  - Principality of Pronsk (1129–1503)
  - Grand Duchy of Moscow (1283–1547)
  - Pskov Republic (1348–1510)
  - Qasim Khanate (1452–1681)
  - Markovo Republic (1905–1906)
  - Lokot Autonomy (1941–1944)
- In the Russian North:
  - Novgorod Republic (1136–1478)
  - Principality of Beloozero (13th–15th century)
  - Petrograd Soviet of Workers' and Soldiers' Deputies (1917–1924)
  - Republic of Uhtua (1918–1920)
  - (Russia) Supreme Administration of the Northern Region (1918)
  - (Russia) Provisional Government of the Northern Region (1918–1920)
  - North Ingria (1919–1920)
- In Southern Russia:
  - Golden Horde (1320–1547)
  - Astrakhan Khanate (1466–1556)
  - Kalmyk Khanate (1630–1771)
  - Novorossiysk Republic (1905)
  - (Russia) South-Eastern Union of Cossack Troops, Highlanders of the Caucasus, and Free Peoples of the Steppes (1917–1918)
  - Kuban People's Republic (1918–1920)
  - Don Soviet Republic (1918)
  - Don Republic (1918–1920)
  - Armed Forces of South Russia (1918–1919)
- In the Volga basin:
  - Principality of Yaroslavl (1218–1463)
  - Principality of Tver (1246–1483)
  - Khanate of Kazan (1438–1552)
  - Stary Buyan Republic (1905)
  - Idel-Ural State (1918)
  - Kazan Soviet Workers' and Peasants' Republic (1918)
  - Committee of Members of the Constituent Assembly (1918)
  - Republic of Tatarstan (1990–1994)
- In the Ural Mountains:
  - Principality of Great Perm (1323–1505)
  - Orenburg Cossack Republic (1917–1920)
  - Bashkiria (1917–1919)
  - Provisional Regional Government of the Urals (1918)
- In Siberia:
  - Khanate of Sibir (1468–1598)
  - Chita Republic (1905–1906)
  - Gray Ukraine (1917–1921)
  - Provisional Siberian Government (1918)
  - Siberian Republic (1918)
  - Confederated Republic of Altai (1918–1920)
- In the Russian Far East:
  - Jaxa (1665–1674)
  - State of Buryat-Mongolia (1917–1920)
  - Yakut Committee of Safeguard and Revolution (1918)
  - Transbaikal Cossack Republic (1918–1920)
  - Balagad State (1919–1926)
  - (Russia) Government of the Russian Eastern Outskirts (1920)
  - Regional Government of Primorye Zemstvo (1920)
  - Far Eastern Republic (1920–1922)
  - Green Ukraine (1920–1922)
  - (Russia) Provisional Priamurye Government (1921–1923)
  - Tungus Republic (1924–1925)

==== Hungary ====
- Kingdom of Hungary (1000–1804)
  - Kingdom of Croatia (1102–1526)
  - Eastern Hungarian Kingdom (1526–1551, 1556–1570)
  - Principality of Transylvania (1570–1711)
  - Principality of Upper Hungary (1682–1685)
  - Principality of Transylvania (1711–1804)
- Kingdom of Hungary (1301–1526)
- Hungarian State (1849)
- Transliethania (1867–1918)
- First Hungarian Republic (1918–1919)
- Hungarian Soviet Republic (1919)
- Hungarian Republic (1919–1920)
- Kingdom of Hungary (1920–1946)
  - Government of National Unity (1944–1945)
- Serbian–Hungarian Baranya–Baja Republic (1921)
- Second Hungarian Republic (1946–1949)
- Hungarian People's Republic (1949–1989)

==== Czechia and Slovakia ====
- Margraviate of Moravia (1182–1918)
- Kingdom of Bohemia (1198–1918)
- Slovak National Council (1848–1849)
- (Czechoslovakia) First Czechoslovak Republic (1918–1938)
- Slovak Soviet Republic (1919)
- (Czechoslovakia) Second Czechoslovak Republic (1938–1939)
- Slovak Republic (1939–1945)
- (Czechoslovakia) Third Czechoslovak Republic (1945–1948)
- (Czechoslovakia) Czechoslovak Socialist Republic (1948–1989; before 1960 as Czechoslovak Republic)
- (Czechoslovakia) Czech and Slovak Federative Republic (1990–1992)

==== Southeastern Europe ====
- In Albania:
  - League of Lezhë (1444–1479)
  - Independent Albania (1912–1914)
  - Republic of Central Albania (1913–1914)
  - Principality of Albania (1914–1925)
  - Autonomous Republic of Northern Epirus (1914)
  - Italian protectorate over Albania (1917–1920)
  - Republic of Mirdita (1921)
  - Albanian Kingdom (1928–1939)
  - Italian protectorate of Albania (1939–1943)
  - German occupation of Albania (1943–1944)
  - People's Socialist Republic of Albania (1946–1992)
- In Bosnia and Herzegovina:
  - Kingdom of Bosnia (1377–1463)
  - Duchy of Saint Sava (1448–1482)
  - Condominium of Bosnia and Herzegovina (1878–1918)
  - Croatian Republic of Herzeg-Bosnia (1991–1996)
  - Republic of Bosnia and Herzegovina (1992–1995)
  - Republika Srpska (1992–1995)
  - Autonomous Province of Western Bosnia (1993–1995)
- In Bulgaria:
  - Principality of Bulgaria (1878–1908)
  - Republic of Tamrash (1878–1886)
  - Strandzha Commune (1903)
  - Tsardom of Bulgaria (1908–1946)
  - People's Republic of Bulgaria (1946–1990)
- In Croatia:
  - Republic of Ragusa (1358–1808)
  - Kingdom of Croatia (1527–1868)
  - Kingdom of Slavonia (1699–1868)
  - Kingdom of Croatia-Slavonia (1868–1918)
  - State of Slovenes, Croats and Serbs (1918)
  - Free State of Fiume (1920–1924)
  - Independent State of Croatia (1941–1945)
  - Free Territory of Trieste (1947–1954)
  - Republic of Serbian Krajina (1991–1995)
- In Greece:
  - Duchy of Athens (1205–1458)
  - Despotate of Epirus (1356–1479)
  - Septinsular Republic (1800–1815)
  - United States of the Ionian Islands (1815–1864)
  - Principality of Samos (1815–1864)
  - Areopagus of Eastern Continental Greece (1821–1825)
  - First Hellenic Republic (1828–1832)
  - Kingdom of Greece (1832–1924, 1935–1941, 1944–1974)
  - Cretan State (1898–1913)
  - Free State of Ikaria (1912)
  - Independent Government of Western Thrace (1913)
  - Samarina Republic (1917)
  - Second Hellenic Republic (1924–1935)
  - Principality of the Pindus (1941–1942)
- In Kosovo:
  - Republic of Kosova (1991–1999)
- In Montenegro:
  - Prince-Bishopric of Montenegro (1516–1852)
  - Principality of Montenegro (1852–1910)
  - Kingdom of Montenegro (1910–1918)
- In North Macedonia:
  - Kruševo Republic (1903)
  - Independent Macedonia (1944)
  - Republic of Vevčani (1991–1993)
- In Romania:
  - Voivodship of Transylvania (12th century–1541)
  - Principality of Wallachia (1330–1859)
  - Principality of Moldavia (1346–1859)
  - Principality of Transylvania (1570–1711)
  - Grand Principality of Transylvania (1711–1867)
  - Duchy of Bukovina (1849–1918)
  - United Principalities of Moldavia and Wallachia (1859–1881)
  - Kingdom of Romania (1881–1947)
  - Moldavian Democratic Republic (1917–1918)
  - Banat Republic (1918–1919)
  - Romanian People's Republic, then the Socialist Republic of Romania (1947–1989)
  - Gagauz Republic (1989–1995)
- In Serbia:
- Tsardom of Bačka (1526–1527)
- Duchy of Syrmia (1527–1530/1532)
  - Revolutionary Serbia (1804–1813)
  - Principality of Serbia (1815–1882)
  - Second Kingdom of Serbia (1882–1918)
  - State of Slovenes, Croats and Serbs (1918)
  - Kingdom of Yugoslavia (1929–1943)
  - Socialist Federal Republic of Yugoslavia (1943–1992)
  - Federal Republic of Yugoslavia (1992–2003)
  - Serbia and Montenegro (2003–2006)
- In Slovenia:
  - County of Cilli (1341–1456)
  - Republic of Prekmurje (1919)
- In European Turkey:
  - Byzantine Empire (395–1453)

==== Caucasus ====
- Transcaucasian Democratic Federative Republic (February 1918–May 1918)
- In Armenia:
  - Erivan Khanate (1736–1828)
  - First Republic of Armenia (1918–1920)
  - Republic of Mountainous Armenia (April 1921–July 1921)
- In Azerbaijan:
  - Elisu Sultanate (1604–1844)
  - Nakhichevan Khanate (1747–1828)
  - Republic of Aras (1918–1919)
  - Centrocaspian Dictatorship (1918)
  - Military Dictatorship of Mughan (1918–1919)
  - Baku Commune (1918)
  - Democratic Republic of Azerbaijan (1918–1920)
  - Republic of Artsakh (1991–2024)
- In Georgia:
  - Kingdom of Georgia (1008–1490)
  - Kingdom of Imereti (1260–1810)
  - Samtskhe-Saatabago (1266–1625)
  - Principality of Guria (1460–1829)
  - Principality of Svaneti (1463–1858)
  - Principality of Abkhazia (1463–1864)
  - Kingdom of Kakheti (1465–1762)
  - Kingdom of Kartli (1478–1762)
  - Principality of Mingrelia (1557–1867)
  - Kingdom of Kartli-Kakheti (1762–1801)
  - Gurian Republic (1902–1906)
  - Democratic Republic of Georgia (1918–1921)
  - Republic of Batumi (1918–1920)
- In North Caucasus and Circassia:
  - Avar Khanate (13th century–1864)
  - Circassia (13th century–1864)
  - Kabardia (c. 1453 – c. 1825)
  - Akhtypara (1732–1839)
  - Altypara (1630–1839)
  - Dokuzpara (16th century–1839)
  - Caucasian Imamate (1828–1859)
  - Mountainous Republic of the Northern Caucasus (1917–1921)
  - Terek Soviet Republic (1918–1919)
  - North Caucasian Soviet Republic (1918–1919)
  - North Caucasian Emirate (1919–1920)
  - Chechen Republic of Ichkeria (1991–2000)
  - Islamic Djamaat of Dagestan (1998–1999)

=== North America ===
==== Canada ====
- Huronia (Wendake) (1649)
- Neutral Confederacy (1650s)
- Council of Three Fires (1776)
- Seven Nations of Canada (1797)
- Republic of Madawaska (1827)
- Republic of Canada (1837–1838)
- Republic of Lower Canada (1838)
- Miꞌkmaꞌki (1867)
- Republic of Manitoba (1867–1870)
- Kulhulmcilh (1869)
- Provisional Government of Assiniboia (1869–1870)
- Iron Confederacy (1885)
- Provisional Government of Saskatchewan (1885)
- Dominion of Newfoundland (1907–1949)
- Rupert's Land
- Nova Scotia
- New Brunswick
- Prince Edward's Island

==== Caribbean Islands ====
- Republic of Pirates (1706–1718)
- First Empire of Haiti (1804–1806)
- Republic of South Haiti (1806–1820)
- State of Haiti (1806–1811)
- Kingdom of Haiti (1811–1820)
- First Haitian Republic (1820–1849)
- Republic of Spanish Haiti (1821–1822)
- First Dominican Republic (1844–1861)
- Second Empire of Haiti (1849–1859)
- Provisional Government of Cibao (1857–1861)
- Second Haitian Republic (1859–1915, 1934–1957)
- Second Dominican Republic (1865–1916)
- Republic of Puerto Rico (1868)
- Republic of Cuba in Arms (1868–1878, 1879–1880, 1895–1899)
- Republic of Puerto Rico (1897)
- Republic of Cuba (1902–1906, 1909–1959)
- Kingdom of La Gonâve (?–1929)
- Third Dominican Republic (1924–1966)
- Republic of Puerto Rico (1950–1954)
- Duvalier Haiti (1957–1986)
- West Indies Federation (1958–1962)
- Republic of Anguilla (1967–1969)
- People's Revolutionary Government of Grenada (1979–1983)

==== Central America ====
- Chetumal (1544)
- Dzuluinicob (1544)
- Miskito Kingdom (1633–1860, 1860–1894)
- Manche Chol (1704)
- Mopan (1720s)
- United Provinces of Central America (1823–1839/1841)
- State of Los Altos (1838–1840, 1848–1849)
- Free State of Costa Rica (1838–1847)
- Free State of the Isthmus (1840–1841)
- Confederation of Central America (1842–1845)
- First Costa Rican Republic (1848–1948)
- Kingdom of Talamanca (1867–1910)
- Greater Republic of Central America (1896–1898)
- Federation of Central America (1921–1922)
- Republic of Tule (1925)

==== Mexico ====
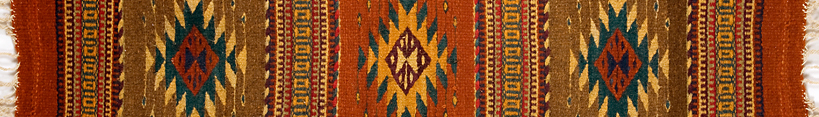
- Zapotec civilization (c. 700 BC – 1521 AD)
- Cocollán (1100–1521)
- Aztec Empire (1428–1521)
- Governing Junta of Mexico (1808)
- Northern America (1813)
- First Mexican Empire (1821–1823)
- Provisional Government of Mexico (1823–1824)
- First Mexican Republic (1824–1835)
- Centralist Republic of Mexico (1835–1846)
- Republic of the Rio Grande (1840)
- Republic of Yucatán (1841–1848)
- Second Federal Republic of Mexico (1846–1863)
- Chan Santa Cruz (1847–1915)
- Republic of Sonora (1853–1854)
- Republic of Baja California (1853–1854)
- Second Mexican Empire (1864–1867)
- Rebel Zapatista Autonomous Municipalities (1994–2023)
- Popular Assembly of the Peoples of Oaxaca (2006)

==== United States ====
- Iroquois Confederacy (between 1142 and 1660–1867)
- Coosa chiefdom (c. 1600)
- Powhatan Confederacy (c. 1600–1686)
- Tovaangar (18th century)
- Republic of Watauga (1772–1778)
- Council of Three Fires (1776)
- Vermont Republic (1777–1791)
- Chahta Yakni (1786–1866)
- Tsalagiyi (ᏣᎳᎩᏱ) [1794–1865]
- Northwestern Confederacy (1783–1795)
  - Wabash Confederacy (1780–1792)
  - Tecumseh's confederacy (1808–1813)
- State of Franklin (1784–1788)
- Trans-Oconee Republic (1794)
- State of Muskogee (1799–1803)
- Yazoo lands (1802)
- Republic of West Florida (1810)
- Republic of East Florida (1812)
- Republic of the Floridas (1817)
- Republic of Fredonia (1826–1827)
- Lenapehoking (1830)
- Illinois Confederation (1832)
- Republic of Indian Stream (1832–1835)
- Republic of Texas (1836–1846)
- Provisional Government of Oregon (1841/1843–1849)
- Comancheria (1845)
- California Republic (June 14 – July 9, 1846)
- State of Deseret (1849–1850)
- The Great Republic of Rough and Ready (1850)
- Beaver Island (1850–1856)
- Palmetto Republic (1860–1861)
- Alabama Republic (1861)
- Republic of Louisiana (1861)
- Republic of Georgia (1861)
- Kingdom of Callaway (1861)
- Republic of Mississippi (1861)
- Confederate States of America (1861–1865)
- Free State of Jones (1863–1865)
- McDonald Territory (1961–1962)

=== Oceania ===
- Kingdom of Bora Bora (till 1888 or 1895)
- Kingdom of Raiatea (till 1888, French protectorate since 1880)
- Kingdom of Huahine (till 1895, French protectorate since 1888)
- Kingdom of Rurutu (till 1900, French protectorate since 1888)
- Kingdom of Rimatara (till 1901, French protectorate since 1888)
- Kingdom of Tahuata (till 1880, French protectorate since 1842)
- Kingdom of Rapa Iti (till 1881, kingship continued to 1887)
- Kingdom of Mangareva (till 1881, French protectorate since 1844/1871)
- Taiohae Kingdom of Nuku Hiva (till 1901, sovereignty ceded to France in 1842)
- Kingdom of Rapa Nui (till 1888)
- Kingdom of Nauru (till 1888)
- Tuʻi Tonga Empire (c. 450 – 1865)
- Saudeleur dynasty (c. 1100 – c. 1628)
- Kingdom of ʻUvea (15th century–1887)
- Kingdom of Alo (1565–1888)
- Kingdom of Niuē-Fekai (c. 1700 – 1901)
- Kingdom of Sigave (1784–1888)
- Kingdom of Tahiti (1788/91–1880, French protectorate since 1842)
- Kingdom of Abemama (1795–1892)
- Kingdom of Hawaii (1795–1893)
- Mangareva (1881)
- United Tribes of New Zealand (1835–1840)
- Kingdom of Rarotonga (1858–1893)
- Kingdom of Fiji (1871–1874)
- Independent Commune of Franceville (1889–1890)
- Provisional Government of Hawaii (1893–1894)
- Republic of Hawaii (1894–1898)
- Republic of Minerva (1972–1973, 1982)
- Vanuaaku People's Provisional Government (1977–1978)
- Republic of Vemerana (1980)
- Republic of Rotuma (1987–1988)

=== South America ===
==== Argentina ====
- United Provinces of the Río de la Plata (1810–1831)
- Liga Federal (1815–1820)
- Republic of Entre Ríos (1820–1821)
- Republic of Tucumán (1820–1821)
- Argentine Confederation (1831–1861)
- State of Buenos Aires (1852–1861)
- Kingdom of Araucanía and Patagonia (1860–1862)

==== Bolivia ====
- Pacajes Kingdom (1100–1480)
- State of Upper Peru (1825)
- Republic of Bolívar (1825)
- Republic of Upper Peru (1828)
- Bolivian Republic (1836–1839)
- Peru-Bolivian Confederation (1836–1839)

==== Brazil ====
- Theocratic Republic of Guairá (1627–1632)
- Liga Federal (1815–1820)
- Pernambuco (1817)
- Empire of Brazil (1822–1889)
- Confederation of the Equator (1824)
- Cabano Government (1835–1840)
- Riograndense Republic (1836–1845)
- Bahia Republic (1837–1838)
- Juliana Republic (1839)
- Republic of Counani (1886–1891)
- Transatlantic Republic of Mato Grosso (1892)
- Principality of Trinidad (1893–1895)
- Manhuassu Republic (1896)
- Republic of Acre (1899–1900, 1903)
- Celestial Monarchy (1912–1916)
- Free Territory of Princesa (1930)
- State of Maracaju (1932)
- State of São Paulo (1932)
- Socialist Republic of Brazil (1935)
- State Union of Jeová (1952–1953)

==== Chile ====
- Government Junta of Chile (1810)
- Kingdom of Chile (1810–1814)
- New State of Chile (1819–1826)
- Conservative Republic (1830–1861)
- Kingdom of Araucania and Patagonia (1862)
- Socialist Republic of Chile (1932)

==== Colombia ====
- Muisca Confederations (c. 1450–1537)
  - High Chiefdom of Bacatá (c. 1450–1537)
    - Chiefdom of Guatavita (c. 1450–1537)
    - Chiefdom of Ubaque (c. 1450–1537)
    - Chiefdom of Ubaté (c. 1450–1537)
    - Chiefdom of Fusagasugá (c. 1450–1537)
  - High Chiefdom of Hunza (c. 1450–1537)
    - Chiefdom of Tenasuca (c. 1450–1537)
    - Chiefdom of Saquencipá (c. 1450–1537)
  - Holy Chiefdom of Iraca (c. 1450–1538)
  - Holy Chiefdom of Tundama (c. 1450–1538)
  - Minor Chiefdom of Chipatá (c. 1450–1538)
  - Minor Chiefdom of Saboyá (c. 1450–1538)
  - Minor Chiefdom of Sorocotá (c. 1450–1538)

Autonomous de facto independent government juntas in Colombia at the start of the Colombian War of Independence:

- Autonomous Governing Junta of the Province of Cartagena (1810–1811)
- Autonomous Governing Junta of the City of Santiago de Cali (1810–1811)
- Autonomous Governing Junta of the Province of Socorro (1810)
- Supreme Governing Junta of Santa Fe in New Granada (1810–1811)
- Autonomous Governing Junta of the Province of Tunja (1810–1811)
- Autonomous Governing Junta of the Province of Neiva (1810–1811)
- Autonomous Governing Junta of the City of San Juan de Girón (1810–1811)
- Autonomous Governing Junta of the Province of New Pamplona (1810–1811)
- Autonomous Governing Junta of the City of Mompox (1810–1811)
- Autonomous Governing Junta of the City of Simití (1810–1811)
- Autonomous Governing Junta of the City of Sogamoso (1810–1811)
- Autonomous Governing Junta of the Province of Santa Marta (1810)
- Autonomous Governing Junta of the Province of Popayán (1810)
- Autonomous Governing Junta of the City of Timaná (1810–1811)
- Autonomous Governing Junta of the Province of Antioquia (1810–1811)
- Autonomous Governing Junta of Quibdó in the Province of Chocó (1810–1811)
- Autonomous Governing Junta of the City of Medellín (1810–1811)
- Autonomous Governing Junta of the City of Ipiales (1810)
- Autonomous Governing Junta of the Town of Soatá (1810–1811)
- Autonomous Governing Junta of the City of Ibagué (1810–1811)
- Autonomous Governing Junta of Pore in the Province of Casanare (1810–1811)
- Autonomous Governing Junta of the City of Tame (1810–1811)
- Autonomous Governing Junta of the City of Nóvita (1810–1811)
- Autonomous Governing Junta of the Province of Mariquita (1810)

Self-declared independent nations during the phase known as the Foolish Fatherland of the Colombian War of Independence:

- Free and Independent State of Cundinamarca (1811–1814)
- United Provinces of New Granada (1811–1816)
  - State of Antioquia (1811)
  - Free State of Cartagena (1811)
  - Province of Casanare (1814–1816)
  - Province of Chocó (1811–1816)
  - Free and Independent State of Socorro (1810–1816)
  - Free State of Mariquita (1814–1816)
  - Free State of Neiva (1814–1816)
  - Province of Pamplona (1814–1816)
  - Republic of Tunja (1811–1816)
  - Confederate Cities of Valle del Cauca (1811)
- Government in Exile of New Granada in the Province of Casanare (1816–1819)

Post-independence nations in Colombia after the end of the Colombian War of Independence:

- Republic of Colombia (Gran Colombia) (1819–1831)
- State of New Granada (1831–1832)
- Republic of New Granada (1832–1858)
- Granadine Confederation (1858–1863)
- United States of New Granada (1860–1863)
  - State of Cauca (1860)
  - State of Santander (1860)
  - State of Boyacá (1860)
  - State of Bolívar (1860)
  - State of Magdalena (1860)
  - State of Tolima (1860)
- United States of Colombia (1863–1886)

Self-proclaimed but unrecognized communist "republics" at the start of the current Colombian Conflict:

- Republic of Marquetalia (1961–1964)

==== Ecuador ====
- State of Quito (1809–1812)
- Republic of Colombia (Gran Colombia) (1819–1831)
- Free Province of Guayaquil (1820–1822)

==== Guyana ====
- Provisional Government Committee of Rupununi (1969)

==== Paraguay ====
- Encarnación Commune (1931)
- El Stronato (1954–1989)

==== Peru ====
- Kingdom of Chimor (c. 900–1470)
- Canas Kingdom (1100–1480)
- Canchis Kingdom (1100–1480)
- Colla Kingdom (1150–1463)
- Lupaca Kingdom (1150–1600)
- Inca Empire (1438–1533)
- Protectorate of Peru (1821–1822)
- Iquicha (1821–1839)
- Republic of South Peru (1836–1839)
- Republic of North Peru (1836–1839)
- Peru-Bolivian Confederation (1836–1839)
- Peruvian Republic (1837)
- Peruvian Republic (1838–1839)
- Federal State of Loreto (1896)
- Jungle Nation (1899–1900)

==== Uruguay ====
- Governing Junta of Montevideo (1808–1809)
- Liga Federal (1815–1820)

==== Venezuela ====
- Supreme Junta (1810–1811)
- First Republic of Venezuela (1811–1812)
- Second Republic of Venezuela (1813–1814)
- Third Republic of Venezuela (1817–1819)
- Republic of Colombia (Gran Colombia) (1819–1831)

=== Other ===
- Islands of Refreshment (1811–1816)

== Modern states and territories by type ==
=== Dismembered countries ===
These states are now dissolved into a number of states.

- Greater German Reich – Dissolved in 1945, its former territory now consists of the entirety of the countries of Austria and Germany, plus parts of what are now: Belarus, the Czech Republic, France, Luxembourg, Poland, Russia, Belgium, the Netherlands, Denmark, Norway, Greece, Serbia, Estonia, Latvia, Lithuania, Ukraine and Slovenia.
- Empire of Brazil – An empire created after Brazil declared its independence in 1822 and dissolved in 1889, now the countries of Brazil and Uruguay (who declared its independence in 1825 and was recognized in 1828).
- Central America – Existed from 1821 to 1841, broken up into: Guatemala, Belize, El Salvador, Honduras, Nicaragua and Costa Rica.
- Republic of China (Mainland Period) – Polity existed to 7 December 1949 and its territory now controlled by: the People's Republic of China (Mainland China); Mongolia; portion of the territory claimed by India and Japan; and parts of Afghanistan, Bhutan, Pakistan, Russia and Tajikistan. The rump state still known as the "Republic of China" continues to control Taiwan and Penghu, which were acquired from Japan in 1945, as well as Kinmen and Matsu Islands, forming part of the rump Fujian Province. See also the political status of Taiwan and the Theory of the Undetermined Status of Taiwan.
- Czechoslovakia – Existed from 1918 to 1992, the country wasn't active in World War II, but the government was in exile, dissolved in 1992, and broken up into the Czech Republic and Slovakia.
- Republic of Colombia (1819–1831) – Historiographically known as Gran Colombia from 1819 to 1831. By 1830 the nation was made up of twelve departments, with the eastern departments breaking away from Gran Colombia to form the State of Venezuela that same year. Later on, the southern departments declared independence and formed the State of Ecuador, leaving the remaining central departments as the only territory left of the republic. These central departments adopted a new constitution in 1831 and became the State of New Granada in 1831, thus officially ending what's known as Gran Colombia. These three resulting nations evolved into modern-day Colombia, Ecuador, Venezuela and Panama, which separated from Colombia in 1903.
- Korea – Ceased to exist in 1910, its former territory now consists of the entirety of territory controlled by North Korea and South Korea plus a portion of territory claimed by Japan.
- Mali Federation – In 1959 formed by Senegal and French Sudan, both parts of French West Africa, as an independent nation. It collapsed in 1960 and is now Senegal and Mali.
- Portugal, Brazil and the Algarves (Reino Unido de Portugal, Brasil e Algarves) – Created in 1815 when Brazil was upgraded to the rank of kingdom once the Portuguese royal family was living in Rio de Janeiro since 1809. This country was dissolved in 1822 when Brazil became independent. Now the countries of: Portugal, Brazil, Cabo Verde, São Tomé and Príncipe, Angola, East Timor and Mozambique.
- Rhodesia – Dissolved in 1979, now the country of Zimbabwe.
- Serbia and Montenegro – Dissolved in 2006, now the countries of Montenegro, Serbia, and the partially recognized Kosovo.
- Somali Republic – Dissolved in 1991, now the countries of Somalia and unrecognized Somaliland.
- Soviet Union – Dissolved in 1991, now the countries of: Armenia, Azerbaijan, Belarus, Georgia, Kazakhstan, Kyrgyzstan, Moldova, Russia, Tajikistan, Turkmenistan, Ukraine and Uzbekistan. The Baltic countries were annexed by the Soviet Union until 1991 (Estonia, Latvia, and Lithuania) were not recognized by most Western countries de jure part of the Soviet Union.
- United Arab Republic – A union formed by Egypt and Syria in 1958. It was dissolved in 1961, though Egypt used the name until 1971. Other Pan-Arab unity agreements with Iraq and Jordan in the 1950s failed.
- United Arab States – A confederation formed by the United Arab Republic and North Yemen in 1958; it was dissolved in 1961.
- Yugoslavia – Dissolved in 1991 and 1992, now the countries of: Bosnia and Herzegovina, Croatia, Montenegro, North Macedonia, Serbia, Slovenia and the partially recognized Kosovo.

=== Nominally independent homelands of South Africa ===
Four of the homelands, or bantustans, for black South Africans, were granted nominal independence by the apartheid regime of South Africa. Not recognised by other nations, these effectively were puppet states and were re-incorporated in 1994.

- Bophuthatswana – Declared independence in 1977, reincorporated in 1994.
- Ciskei – Declared independence in 1981, reincorporated in 1994.
- Transkei – Declared independence in 1976, reincorporated in 1994.
- Venda – Declared independence in 1979, reincorporated in 1994.

=== Secessionist states ===
These nations declared themselves independent, but failed to achieve it in fact or did not seek permanent independence and were either re-incorporated into the mother country or incorporated into another country.

- Carpatho-Ukraine – Declared independence from Czechoslovakia in 1939, but was occupied and annexed by Hungary in one day.
- Cartagena Canton – The haven city of Cartagena, Spain, seceded from the First Spanish Republic in 1873.
- Catalan Republic (April 14–17, 1931).
- Chechnya – Virtually independent from Russia from 1996 as Chechen Republic of Ichkeria; however, the country was recognized only by the Taliban. After terrorist attacks in 1999 the republic was returned to Russia's control in the Second Chechen War.
- Confederate States – Occupied the southeastern United States, stretching from Texas to Virginia. Declared secession from the U.S. in 1861, reintegrated into the U.S. in 1865. Reconstruction ended in 1876 and U.S. troops withdrew as an occupation force in 1877. South Carolina was the first state to declare its secession from the United States, doing so on December 20, 1860. Political factions in the "border states" of Kentucky and Missouri declared themselves parts of the Confederacy and controlled small portions of those regions early in the war. The major Indian tribes in Oklahoma signed an alliance with the Confederacy and participated in its military efforts against the U.S.
- Crimean Autonomous Soviet Socialist Republic – Declared independence from Ukraine in 1992 but soon settled for being an autonomous republic within Ukraine.
- Cruzob – Achieved independence from Mexico in 1856 but was re-annexed in 1901.
- Green Ukraine – Declared independence from Far Eastern Republic in 1920, dissolved in 1922.
- Herzeg-Bosnia – Separated from Bosnia and Herzegovina in 1992, reincorporated into the country in 1994.
- Italian Social Republic (1943–1945)
- Katanga – Declared its independence of the newly formed Democratic Republic of the Congo in 1960, was incorporated again into the country in 1963.
- Serbian Krajina – Declared independence from Croatia in 1991, reincorporated into the country in 1995.
- South Kasai – Declared independence from the Democratic Republic of the Congo in June 1960, reincorporated into the country in December 1961.
- Supreme Administration of Northern Region – Proclaimed independent in 1918, later became the Provisional Government of the Northern Region.
- Republika Srpska – Separated from Bosnia and Herzegovina in 1992, reincorporated into the country in 1995.
- Principality of Trinidad – Declared independence in 1893, claimed by United Kingdom in 1895, but incorporated by Brazil.
- Western Bosnia – Declared independence from Bosnia and Herzegovina in 1993 and reincorporated into it in 1995.
- Novorossiya – Established in 2015 as a result of the merger of the Donetsk People's Republic with the Luhansk People's Republic, and at the beginning of 2015 the confederation project was suspended.
  - Donetsk People's Republic – Declared independence on April 7, 2014. As a result of a staged referendum of September 30, 2022, it was incorporated as a republic into the Russian Federation. The incorporation is not recognised.
  - Luhansk People's Republic – Declared independence on April 27, 2014. As a result of a staged referendum of September 30, 2022, it was incorporated as a republic into the Russian Federation. The incorporation is not recognised.
- Republic of Artsakh – Declared independence from Azerbaijan in 1991, reincorporated into the country in 2024.

=== Annexed countries ===
These nations, once separate, are now part of another country. Cases of voluntary accession are included.

- Regency of Carnaro in 1919 and Free State of Fiume 1920–1924 – Two short-lived states in the port city of Fiume/Rijeka proclaimed by Gabriele D'Annunzio. Following World War I, the city was disputed between Italy and Yugoslavia, and it was eventually captured by Italy in 1921. The city passed to Yugoslavia after World War II and is now in Croatia.
- Couto Misto – Tiny 10th-century border territory that was split between Spain and Portugal in 1868.
- Crete – Autonomous under Ottoman suzerainty in 1898, unilaterally declared union with Greece in 1908, which was recognized in 1913.
- East Germany – Joined West Germany in 1990 and now part of Germany in the German reunification.
- England – Merged with Scotland to form the Kingdom of Great Britain in 1707, now part of the United Kingdom.
- Franceville (1889–1890) – Independent in 1889, later governed by France and Britain as part of the New Hebrides; now part of Vanuatu.
- Hatay – Part of the Mandate of Syria that became part of Turkey; independent 1938–1939.
- Hawaii – Annexed on July 7, 1898, by the 55th Congress of the United States of America; became the 50th state of the U.S. in 1959.
- Khanate of Kalat (1638, 1666–1955) – 1666 to 1955, became part of Pakistan.
- Free States of Menton and Roquebrune – Seceded from Monaco in 1848, under nominal protection of the Kingdom of Sardinia, then annexed by France in 1861.
- Moresnet (1816–1920) – Tiny European territory that endured for a hundred years before definitively becoming part of Belgium.
- Natalia Republic (1839–1843) – Was quickly made into a British colony.
- Newfoundland (1907–1949) – Joined Canada as the tenth province.
- Islands of Refreshment – The islands of Tristan da Cunha were settled in 1810 and declared independence in 1811. Annexed by the United Kingdom in 1815.
- Scotland – Merged with England to form the Kingdom of Great Britain in 1707, now part of the United Kingdom.
- South Vietnam – Occupied by North Vietnam in 1975 and annexed into it in 1976.
- Republic of Tatarstan – Existed from 1992 until annexed by Russia in 1994.
- Tibet – Annexed by the People's Republic of China in 1951 following the signing of the Seventeen Point Agreement.
- Transvaal – Now part of South Africa.
- Texas – Annexed by the U.S. in 1845.
- Vermont Republic – Annexed by the US in 1791.

== See also ==
- List of former monarchies
- List of former national capitals
- List of historical unrecognized states and dependencies
- List of largest empires
- List of micronations
- Lists of political entities by century
- List of sovereign states
  - List of Bronze Age states (c. 3300 – c. 1200 BC)
  - List of Iron Age states (c. 1200 – c. 600 BC)
  - List of Classical Age states (c. 600 BC – c. AD 200)
  - List of states during Late Antiquity (c. 200 – c. 700)
  - List of states during the Middle Ages (c. 700 – c. 1500)
  - List of pre-modern states
- List of colonies
- List of French client states
- Timeline of geopolitical changes (before 1500)
- Timeline of geopolitical changes (1500–1899)
- Timeline of geopolitical changes (1900–1999)
- Timeline of geopolitical changes (2000–present)
- Former countries in Europe after 1815
- List of historic states of Germany
  - List of states in the Holy Roman Empire
- List of historic states of Italy
- List of tribes and states in Belarus, Russia and Ukraine
- Political history of the world
- Princely state – Indian vassal states under the British Raj
