= Non-sovereign nation =

Depending on the context, the term non-sovereign nation, non-sovereign state or non-sovereign country, could mean:

- A previously independent state, representing those nations which were independent but were subsumed into transnational states like the United Kingdom or Germany. See List of former sovereign states
- An active autonomist or secessionist movement, representing those nations which are currently part of a transnational state but would like to secede from the state. See List of active autonomist and secessionist movements
- A dependent territory, a territory which often has a high degree of self-governance, but which is governed by another "parent" state. It often has cultural and historical ties to, and relies on, the parent state for defence.

== See related ==
- Devolution
