= Free Territory of Princesa =

Former de facto federal state of Brazil

Free Territory of Princessa Territorio Livre de Princesa
- 1930
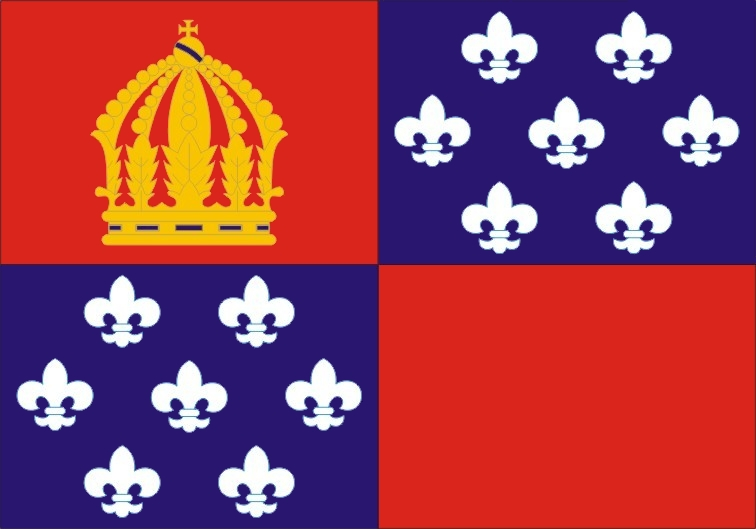
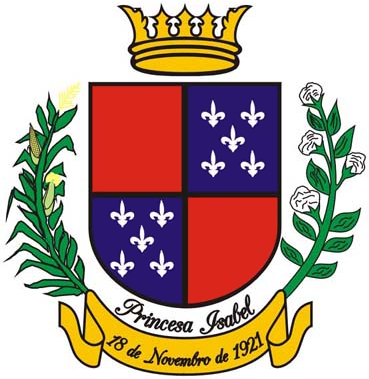
- Flag Coat of arms

- Map of the territory

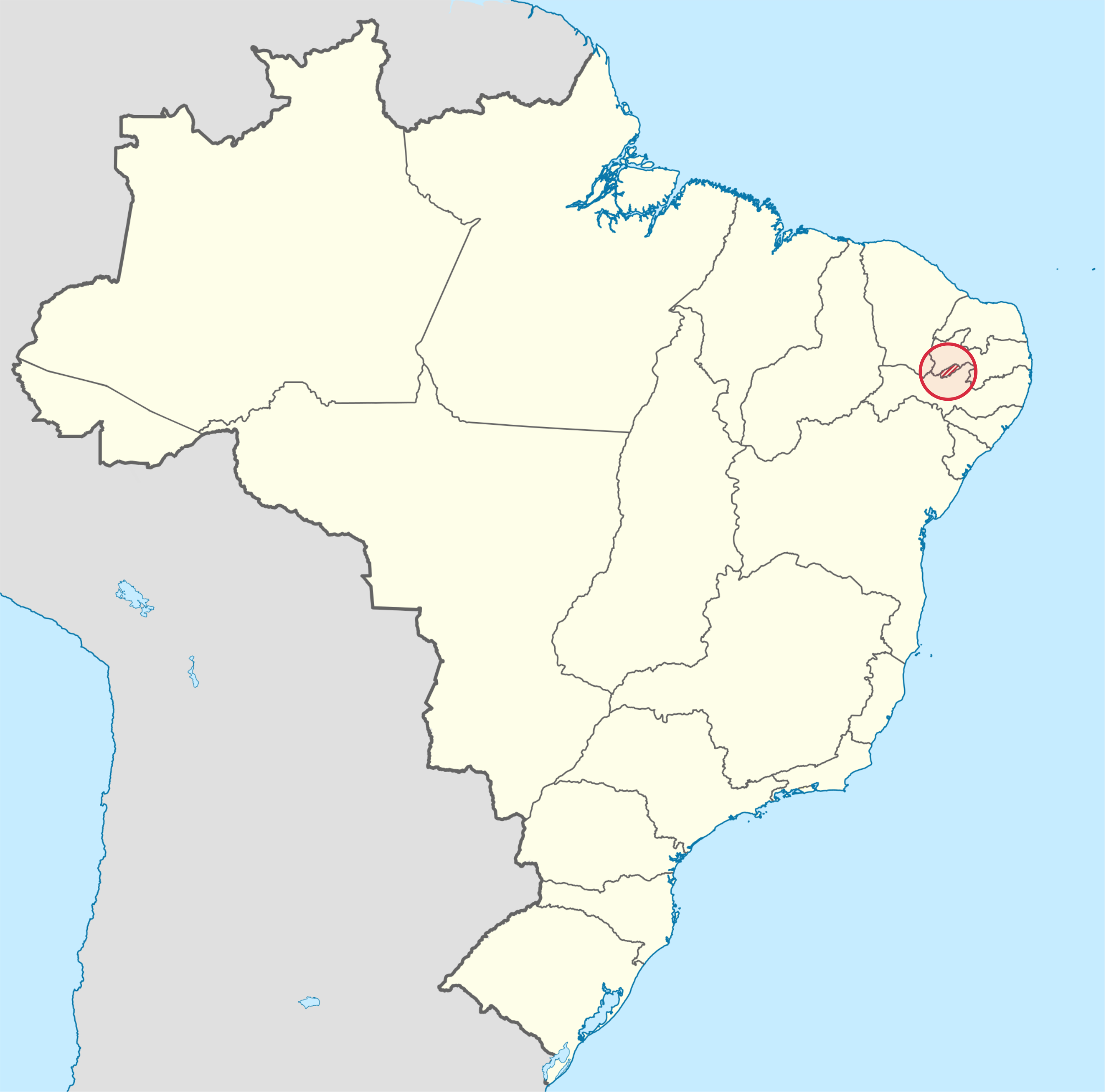
- Territory's location in Brazil
- Status: Unrecognized state
- Capital: Princesa
- Official languages: Portuguese
- Government: Provisional government
  - Junta: José Pereira Lima; José Frazão Medeiros Lima; Manuel Rodrigues Sinhô
- History
  - Territorial secession from the state of Paraíba: 28 february
  - Death of Paraíba's governor João Pessoa: 26 July
  - Occupation of Princesa: 11 August
| Preceded by | Succeeded by |
| Paraiba | Paraiba |

The Free Territory of Princesa, also known as the Republic of Princesa (Portuguese: Território Livre de Princesa or República de Princesa), was a de facto federal state of Brazil located in the Teixeira Mountain Range, between the provinces of Paraíba and Pernambuco. It functioned as a Brazilian territory directly subordinate to the central government in Rio de Janeiro.

The territory was established on 28 February 1930 on lands corresponding to the municipality of Princeza (present-day Princesa Isabel). Its secession from the province of Paraíba resulted from the dissatisfaction of local oligarchies with the Paraíba government, particularly regarding disputes over tax collection. The territory was placed under a provisional administration led by a military junta, which formally declared secession from Paraíba.

The territory was de facto retaken by the government on 11 August 1930, following an agreement between the secessionists and the new government established in the capital of Paraíba.

== Geography ==
The Free Territory corresponded to the former area of the municipality of Princesa Isabel, which, in addition to the town of Princesa, included the districts of Belém, São José (present-day São José de Princesa), and Alagoa Nova (present-day Manaíra). The territory covered an area of 1,739 km² in the western portion of the Teixeira Mountain Range and had an estimated population of approximately 20,000 inhabitants. It bordered the province of Paraíba to the north and west and the province of Pernambuco to the south and east. The rivers within the territory belonged to the Piancó River basin, and its highest point was located in the southern sector, in the Pau Ferrado Mountain Range, at an elevation of 1,120 meters.

== History ==
=== Establishment of the territory and Provisional Government ===
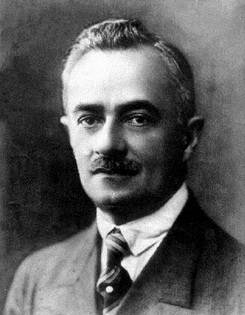
João Pessoa, governor of Paraíba.

After assuming office, the elected governor of Paraíba, João Pessoa Cavalcanti de Albuquerque, intensified the persecution of cangaceiros in the interior of the province, as well as the collection of export taxes on cotton, measures that generated significant discontent among local landowning colonels entrenched in an archaic political structure that relied, among other practices, on authoritarianism and the use of jagunços.

At the time, the Port of Recife was the principal exporter of cotton produced in the region, a circumstance that resulted in significant tax losses for the province of Paraíba. In an effort to reduce these losses, João Pessoa ordered the establishment of several inspection posts in the region, a measure that further exacerbated tensions with the local colonels.

Following the invasion of Teixeira by the Paraíba police force and the imminent advance toward the town of Princesa, Colonel José Pereira and other local colonels, acting with discreet support from Brazil’s president, Washington Luís, and from the governors of Pernambuco, Estácio de Albuquerque Coimbra, and Rio Grande do Norte, Juvenal Lamartine de Faria, decided to proclaim the secession of the territory from the province of Paraíba. From that point forward, the territory was declared directly subordinate to the federal government in Rio de Janeiro.

=== War of Princessa ===
The secession prompted the governor to make several attempts to restore order in Princesa, all of which failed, an episode that became known as the War of Princesa.

=== Dissolution ===
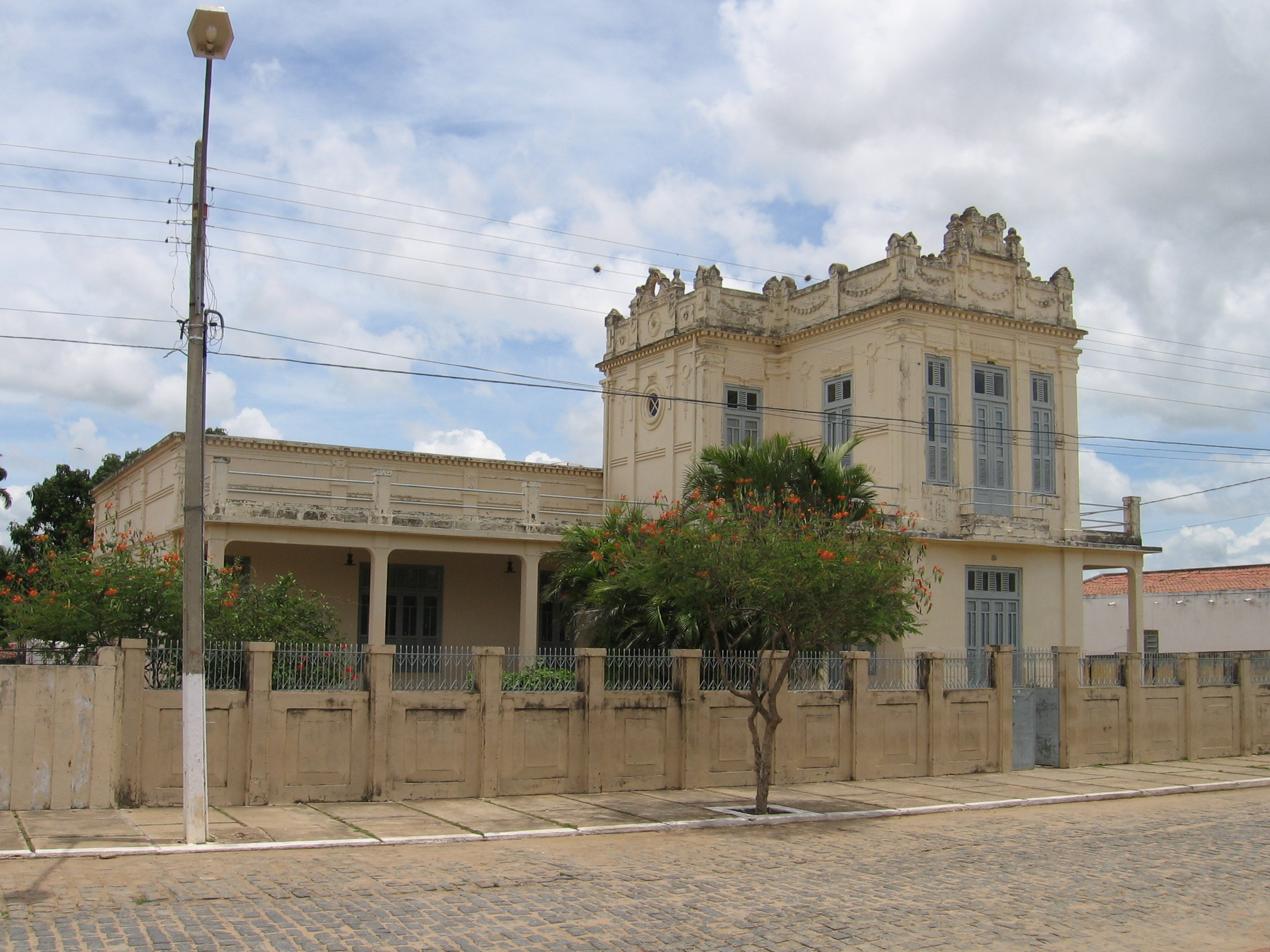
Solar do Cel. José Pereira, in Princesa Isabel.

When Governor João Pessoa was assassinated by the lawyer João Duarte Dantas, and Colonel José Teixeira withdrew for personal reasons, the strength of the armed movement in Princesa collapsed.

The president of the republic, Washington Luís, decided to end the revolt, and the colonels offered no resistance. In accordance with a prior agreement, 600 soldiers from the 19th and 21st Battalions of Chasseurs, commanded by Captain João Facó, occupied the city on 11 August 1930, officially bringing an end to the Free Territory of Princesa and reintegrating it into the province of Paraíba under the name Vila de Princesa.
