= Jefferson Jones =

Jefferson Jones (c. 1817 – 1879) was a 19th-century American army colonel. He is best known for his role in leading the secessionist Kingdom of Callaway as its king in the 1860s.

The source of Jones' rank of colonel is uncertain. He does not appear on lists of officers of the United States Army, either regular or volunteer. He may have had a commission in the Confederate Army or the Missouri State Guard, the latter of which was formed from secessionist Missourians.

The Kingdom of Callaway was a county in Missouri that did not agree with the politics of either side in the American Civil War. As a result, it went on its own for a time. What made Callaway unique was that the Union general John B. Henderson signed a peace treaty with the Kingdom in October 1861, thus lending legitimacy to its existence.

The Union Army invaded Callaway, and Jones's administration was unable to stop it.

Jones was subsequently captured by Union forces and convicted for treason at a court martial. He was originally sentenced to solitary confinement, but the sentence was reduced to being confined to the limits of St. Louis. He remained in the city for the remainder of the war.

After the war, he was active in Democratic Party politics and was elected a state representative in 1875. He suffered a heart attack while he was giving a speech in 1876 and died in 1879.
