= Princesa Isabel =

Coordinates: 7°44′13″S 37°59′34″W

- Municipality
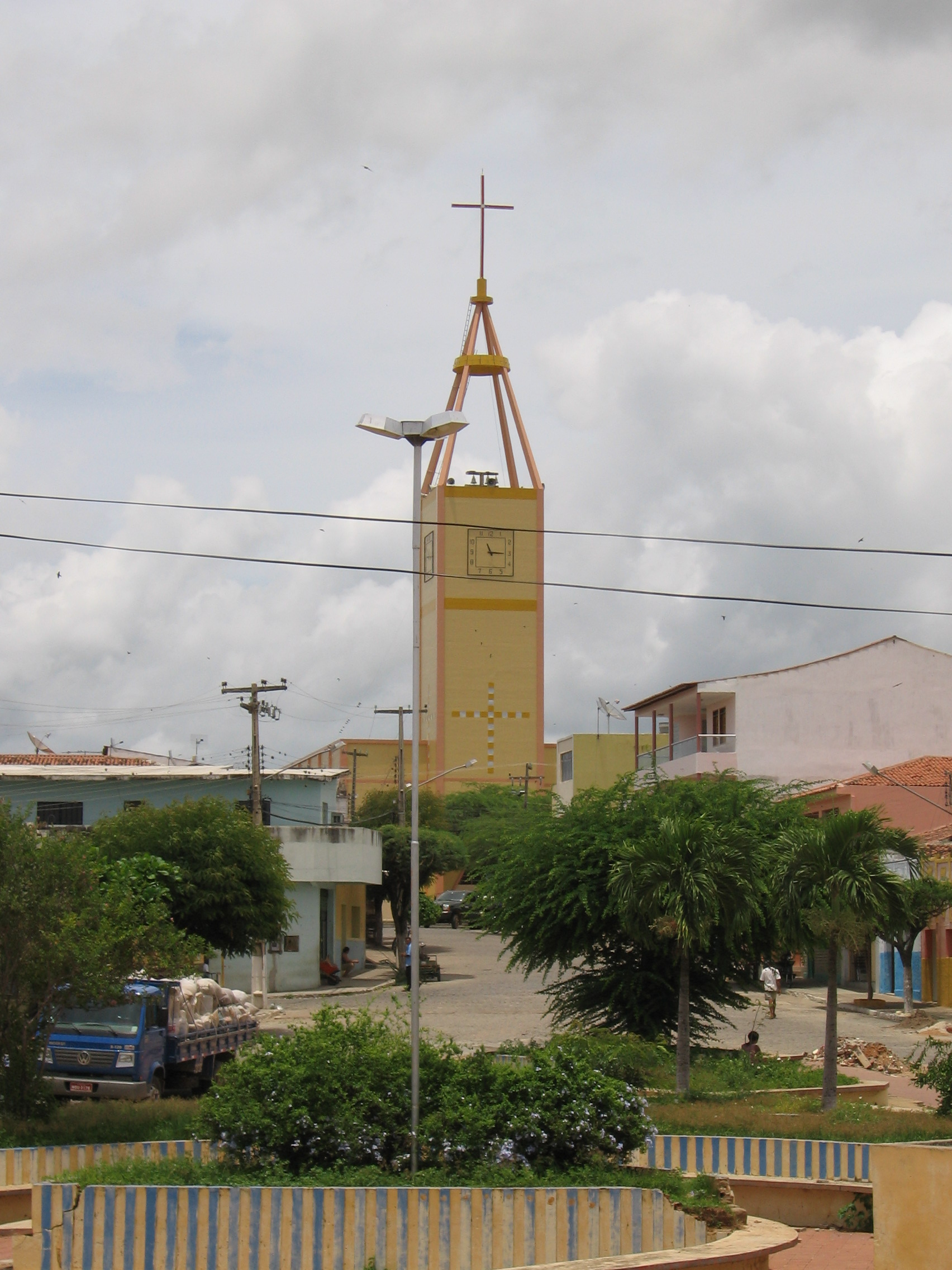

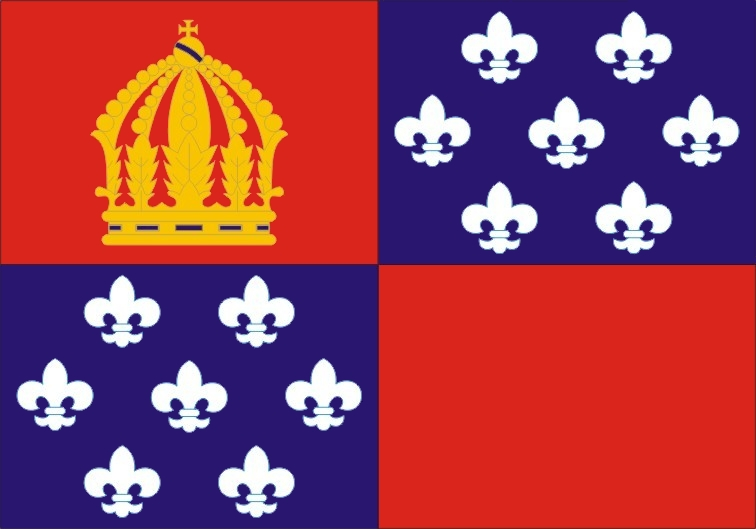
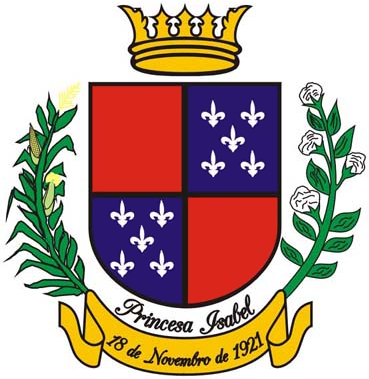
- Flag Coat of arms

- Location of Princesa Isabel within Paraíba
- Country: Brazil
- Region: Northeast
- State: Paraíba
- Mesoregion: Sertao Paraibana

Population (2020)
  - Total: 23,549
- Time zone: UTC−3 (BRT)

Princesa Isabel is a municipality in the state of Paraíba in the Northeast Region of Brazil.

== See also ==
- List of municipalities in Paraíba
- Isabel, Princess Imperial of Brazil (1846–1921), the princess mainly known as "Princesa Isabel" in Brazil
