= Republic of Vevčani =

Symbolic microstate

Република Вевчани Republika Vevčani Republic of Vevčani
- Micronation (unrecognized entity)
- Location: Vevčani, North Macedonia
- Area claimed: 22.8 km^{2} (8.8 sq mi)
- Claimed by: Village residents
- Dates claimed: 19 September 1991–present

The Republic of Vevčani (Macedonian: Република Вевчани, romanized: Republika Vevčani, pronounced ['vɛftʃani]), also known as the Independent Republic of Vevčani, was a short-lived self-proclaimed country on the territory of North Macedonia after the breakup of Yugoslavia in 1991 and is now a symbolic micronation. The residents of the same-named village declared its independence in 1991 after the Vevčani Emergency in 1987, when the Yugoslav communist government attempted to redirect the water springs of the village. They made their own flag and coat of arms – two harlequins dancing over a cauldron. They also issued red passports. A currency was created as a souvenir. Until 1994, Vevčani was under the jurisdiction of the Struga Municipality but it ended up creating its own municipality.

== History ==
In 1987, the people of Vevčani, in an event known as Vevčani Emergency, protested against the Yugoslav communist government's plan to redirect the village's spring water to new villas for the communist elite. The special police used batons in an attempt to stop the protest. Vevčani also threatened to secede from Yugoslavia in the same year. The protesters set up barricades and were beaten for weeks until the government backed off. On 19 September 1991, 11 days after the declaration of independence of Macedonia, the local people declared Vevčani as an independent republic, with only 36 out of 2,000 people voting against independence. They reportedly stashed their guns and demanded to be left alone. Its independence was never recognized by the Republic of Macedonia (now North Macedonia). In 1994, Vevčani created its own municipality, splitting from the Struga Municipality.

Vevčani made its own flag and coat of arms, depicting two harlequins dancing over a magic cauldron, and issued its own red passports.

In 2002 The New York Times quoted the village's self-styled consul, Nenad Batkovski, that they "were determined not to let anyone manipulate us". They reported that the villagers, of which there were some 2,500, believed that their independent spirit helped them preserve peace, and that this Christian village lived peacefully with its Muslim neighbors.

== Currency ==
It also created its own currency, the ličnik (Macedonian: личник), to hand out as souvenirs but it is not legal tender. It promoted them for tourism in 2002. The currency came in 8 denominations of 1, 2, 5, 10, 50, 100, 500 and 1,000.

On 7 August 2020, the anniversary of the Emergency, in cooperation with the mayor of the municipality, the cryptocurrency "crypto ličnik" was launched. This is the official cryptocurrency of the symbolic country.
