= Independent State of Raqqa =

1920-1921 state in Syria

- 1920–1921
- Flag
- Capital: Raqqa
- Common languages: Arabic
- Religion: Sunni Islam
- President
  - 1920-1921: Hajim bin Fadel Al Muhaid
- History
  - Establishment in al-Raqqa of an independent, free Arab state: 10 August 1920
  - Conquest by French forces: 17 December 1921
Preceded by	Succeeded by
State of Aleppo	State of Aleppo
- Today part of: Syria

The Independent State of Raqqa (10 August 1920 – 17 December 1921), also known as the State of Hajim bin Muhaid, was a short-lived independent state based in Raqqa declared by Sheikh Hajim bin Fadel Al Muhaid as a resistance to the French occupation of Syria.

== Background ==
Hajim bin Fadel Al Muhaid was born in 1869 and grew up as an orphan in the house and leader of the Fadaan section of the Anazzah, Turki bin Jad'an Al Muhaid. When Turki died leaving two children, Mujhim and Muhammad, tribal tradition prevented the eldest of them (Mujhim) from assuming the role of sheikh. Hajim was made sheikh at the age of nineteen until Mujhim reached maturity. After Mujhim grew up, Hajim ceded the leadership to him, though a group from the tribe remained subordinate to him. During World War I, Hajim allied himself with the Ottoman authorities, who encouraged him to resist French colonial advances in the region. When the news spread that Aleppo and Damascus had surrendered to the French, a consensus among some of the clans was made to form the Administrative Committee. The Franco-Syrian War and the martyrdom of Yusuf al-Azma further solidified their desire for independence.

== History of the State ==
After the French occupation of Aleppo in 1920, General Guiraud issued a declaration which defined the borders of the Aleppo's governance, which included Raqqa and Deir ez-Zor. Hajim declared independence of the state of Raqqa on 10 August 1920. Meanwhile, the French drew Hajim's nephew Mujhim to their side. Hajim called for the formation of a national army which he would lead, after he had been granted the rank of major general by the Administrative Committee. In September, the French launched a campaign to seize control over Raqqa, bombing the city, after the Turks announced their support of Hajim. The battle over Raqqa ended with a partial victory for Hajim, who then began a march to Aleppo, capturing several areas along the way, including Manbij. Hajim hoped that a reinforcement of a few thousand Turkish soldiers would arrive, but the Turks abandoned their promises to him and the French government rushed a secret treaty to stop supplies to him. French forces arrived in Raqqa on 17 December of 1921, and Hajim rode off on horse to the camps of his tribal grounds.

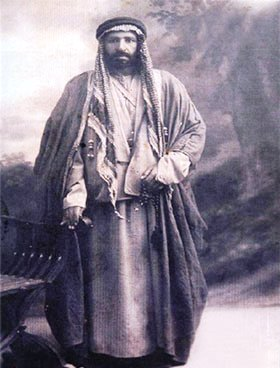
A photograph of Hajim

The French wanted to try Hajim in Aleppo, but Mujhim dissuaded them, and Hajim would return to tribal duties until his death in 1927.
