= Novorossiysk Republic =

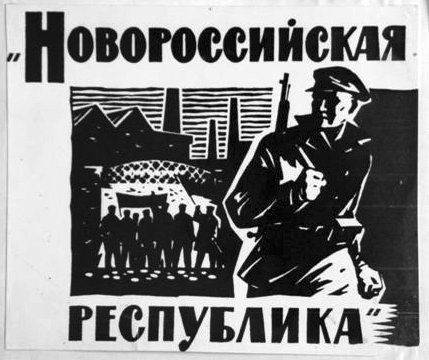
Poster dedicated to the Republic of Novorossiya

The Novorossiysk Republic (Russian: Новороссийская республика) was a short lived breakaway state that existed from 12 to 25 December 1905. This short lived republic was one of many that broke away from the Russian Empire during the 1905 Russian Revolution.

Earlier, in the latter half of the 19th century Novorossiysk developed rapidly from humble beginnings and a population of only 430 in 1866 it developed rapidly with the construction of the first factory in the city in 1882, and the connection of the city by rail in 1888. To give some perspective on the growth of Novorossiysk, between 1887 and 1940 the ports' total economic turnover increased by over 1.4 million tons.

By the time the 20th century came to be rebel movements were sparking all across the Black Sea region, including in Novorossiysk. In 1902 the Novorossiysk Social Democratic Union is created. Across 1905 several strikes were organized in Novorossiysk, one in February, one in May, and another one in July. The most powerful uprising however came in December. On 8 December Bolshevik leaders in Novorossiysk proclaimed an armed uprising against the government of the Russian Empire. On 14 December the government introduced many new policies such as; an eight-hour work day, a new workers committee which would control the hiring and dismissing of workers, a new armed workers squad which took control of the railways and sea transport on behalf of the government, taxation of the rich, a new peoples court, and a new socialist newspaper of which four issues were published. On 24 December Tsarist forces were sent to Novorossiysk, in order to preserve the revolutionary forces the government offered no resistance and stopped operation on 25 December. The Novorossiysk socialist movement went underground as Tsarist forces entered the city, seven socialist officials from the republic were given death sentences (later spared and their punishment reduced to hard labor), and 13 others were assigned various forms of hard labor.
