= Stary Buyan Republic =

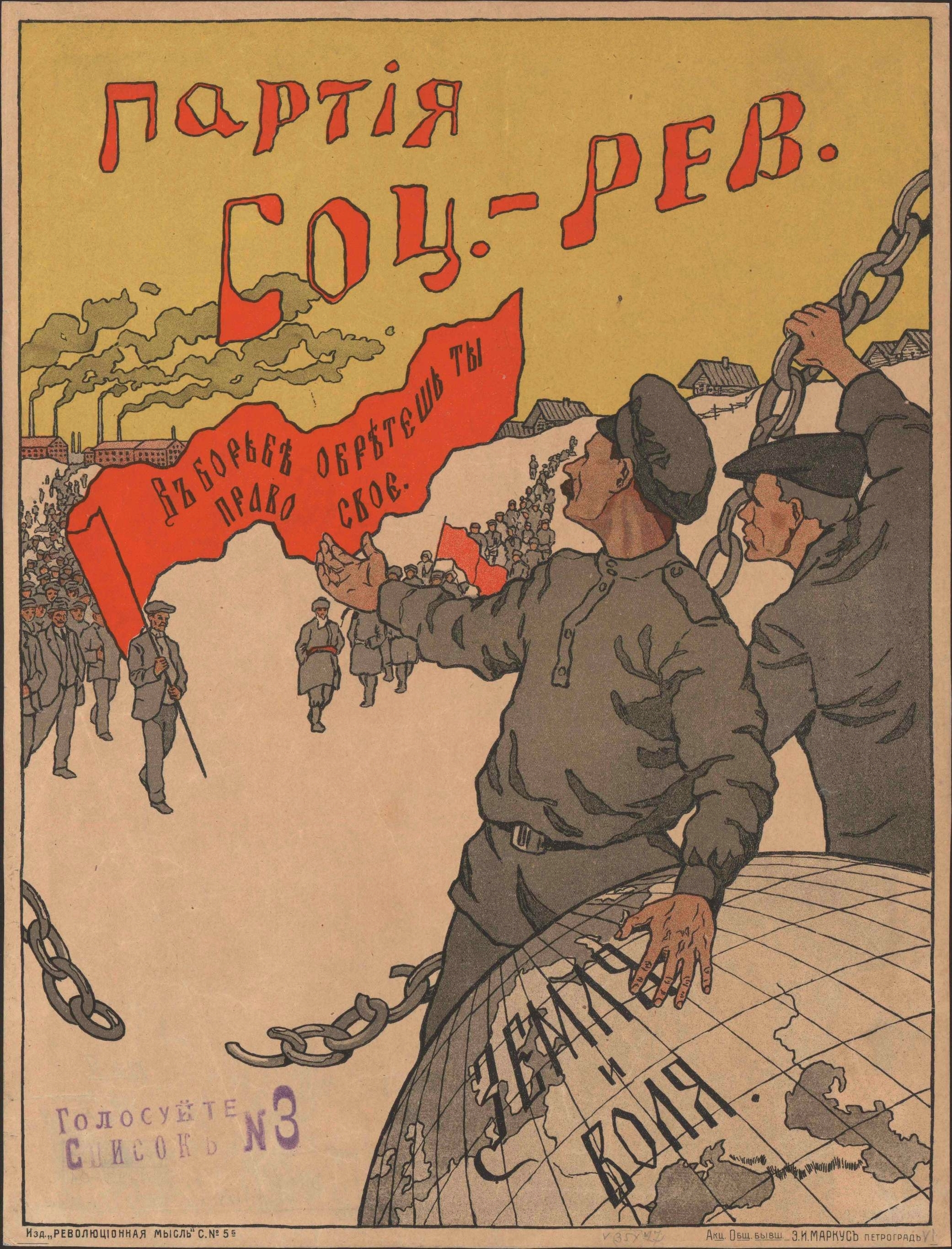
Socialist-Revolutionary poster

The so-called Stary Buyan Republic (Russian: Старобуянская республика, romanized: Starobuyanskaya respublika) was a short-lived separatist movement in the Samara Governorate of the Russian Empire during the Revolution of 1905.

== Origins ==
The village of Novaya Tsarevshchina became the cradle of the revolt, as it had been infiltrated by social revolutionaries since the 1880s. Many of these people were to become the leaders of the future "republic." In 1902, the village teachers and doctor formed a peasant revolutionary club, which began to be especially active late in 1904. At about that time the revolutionary S.I. Akramovsky arrived in Samara, where he organized the "Peasants' Union."

Early in 1905 members of the Socialist-Revolutionary Party began arriving in the gubernia, and by the summer they had incited the peasantry to begin to rally and demonstrate. Towards autumn these manifestations had grown greatly in size, with the peasants even forming their own militia by the end of October. Soon similar demonstrations were taking place in the larger village of Stary Buyan, with slogans such as "Away with autocracy" (Russian: Долой самодержавие). The local police unit refused to restore order.

== Revolt and independence ==
Early in November, the gubernia's authorities sent their representatives to Stary Buyan to select the new village elders. Instead of a routine ceremony, they were greeted by about 200 armed villagers from Novaya Tsarevshchina who called a village meeting. There the villagers voted to expel the Imperial representatives, form a "People's Militia" to guard the forests which were an important source of income, and set up a peasants' republic, effectively seceding from the Russian Empire. The new government set up a "Provisional Law" and began to confiscate land from landowners and distribute it evenly among the peasantry.

== Crushing of the revolt and aftermath ==
The authorities in Samara finally decided to crush the fledgling republic. The early attempts of the police and guards to put down the revolt, however, were repulsed. The government then decided to dispatch a special punitive expedition of Cossacks and gendarmes led by the vice-governor of the gubernia to Stary Buyan. On 26 November 1905 the Stary Buyan Republic was crushed, and its leaders and active participants were arrested and sentenced. The effects of the rebellion were far-reaching, as the "Provisional Law" spread among the peasant communities of the Russian Empire and helped encourage further violence that we now know as the Russian Revolution of 1905.
