= Erzincan Soviet =

Soviet republic in Turkey, 1916–1921

Erzincan Soviet Erzincan Şûrası
- 1916–1921
- Flag
- Status: Unrecognized state
- Capital: Erzincan (1916-1918); Yeşilyazı
- Common languages: Turkish; Kurdish language Armenian language
- Government: Soviet republic
- Historical era: World War 1 · Revolutions of 1917–1923
  - Established: 1916
  - Disestablished: 1921
- Today part of: Turkey

The Erzincan Soviet was a Soviet republic created by local forces in the Erzincan region of Turkey during WW1 following the Battle of Erzincan. It was dissolved in 1921 by the Kuva-yi Millye's intervention in the region, though some sources pin its dissolution on the Ottoman army.

The Erzincan Soviet was the first Soviet republic to be created on Ottoman territory and was modelled on the communist governments established across the territory of the Russian Empire during the Russian Revolution.

== Background ==
In 1917, the Russian armies located in Anatolia were in disarray due to indiscipline and Bolshevik influence among the army. As the February Revolution started in Russia, power in the area had passed to a force known as the Special Transcaucasian Committee. However, this committee failed to improve the situation on the front, as Russian soldiers were unwilling to fight and desertion was common. In this state of disarray, the Russian army attacked Tunceli several times but was unsuccessful.

=== Erzincan Armistice ===
Following the October revolution, Russian soldiers established "Revolutionary Soldiers' Councils" on the front lines of Anatolia and arrested pro-Tsarist generals and officers. Revolutionary forces in the Russian military units were formed as the 1st Red Guard Army which then released Ottoman prisoners of war after explaining the principles of communism to them and encouraged the local population to rebel.

Following orders from the Soviet government, the 1st Army signed the Erzincan Armistice with the Ottoman government on December 17–18, 1917. According to the terms of the agreement, all Russian armies, including the Red Guards, were to withdraw from Anatolian territories within three months. However, the Ottoman army was not permitted to enter the vacated areas.

== Creation of the Soviet ==
After the agreement, the Bolshevik commander Arshak Jamalyan gathered the Kurdish, Turkish, and Armenian leaders from the area to create a soviet that would govern the area. The name of the Armenian representatives was Muradov, the Kurdish and Turkish representatives were Alişer and Alişan. There were 25 people chosen as representatives for the different surrounding villages and towns in the province, and efforts were made to spread the soviet's control into the surrounding areas.

The governors of the soviet raised red flags throughout Erzincan following the Soviet's creation. This movement soon spread to Erzurum, Erzincan, Bayburt, and Sivas, and historian Orhan Dilber estimates that the Ottoman army had repressed it by 1918. On April 30, 1919, Mustafa Kemal Atatürk was sent to Samsun as the Inspector of the 9th Army by the Damat Ferit Pasha government to examine the situation on the ground following the council movement that had arisen in the eastern areas.

Following the entry of Ottoman forces into Erzincan, the Turkish delegates of the Soviet called for the Soviet's government to relocate to Tunceli. The soviet decided to move the centre to Yeşilyazı, which is located within the borders of the present-day Ovacık district of Tunceli.

== Dissolution ==
Following the defeat of the Koçgiri rebellion, some of whose forces were affiliated with the Soviet administration in Yeşilyazı in 1921, the soviet was dissolved.
