= Cheonmasan Army =

Korean militant organization

- Leader: Choi Si-heung
- Founded: 1920
- Dissolved: 1924
- Country: Korea
- Allegiance: Provisional Government of the Republic of Korea; Korean Unification Government
- Headquarters: Mt. Chŏnma (Chonma-san), Sakju, North Pyongan
- Ideology: Korean independence movement
- Size: 500

- Cheonmasan Army
- Hangul: 천마산대
- Hanja: 天馬山隊
- RR: Cheonmasandae
- MR: Ch'ŏnmasandae

Cheonma Army
- Hangul: 천마대
- Hanja: 天馬隊
- RR: Cheonmadae
- MR: Ch'ŏnmadae

The Cheonmasan Army (Korean: 천마산대) was an organization that carried out guerrilla warfare among domestically-based armed struggle groups from the March 1st Movement until 1924. The army was led by General Choi Si-heung and also involved his younger brother, Choi Si-chan. For several years, it was seen as the most revolutionary guerrilla organization based in Korea.

The Cheonmasan Army was also referred to as Cheonmadae due to its base's location on Mt. Chŏnma (Chonma-san) in Goryeongsak-myeon, Uiju-gun, North Pyongan Province; other names included Cheonmabyeolyeong and Cheolmabyeolyeong.

== Background ==
Choi Si-heung, and his younger brother Choi Si-chan, grew up in Uiju County in North Pyongan Province. As children, the two brothers lost their parents early and couldn't further their education.

In 1914, Choi Si-heung and Oh Dong-jin attended the first Cheonmasan conference. Other attendees included Lee Kwan-jip (father of Yi Yu-rip, a pro-independence activist), Kim Hyo-woon, Lee Deok-su, Park Eung-baek, Yang Seung-woo, Lee Yong-dam, Lee Tae-jip, Seo Cheongsan, and Baek Hyeong-gyu. Choi Si-heung later moved to Sinpung-ri, Gugok-myeon, Sakju, and became the third president of Danhak.

== Founding ==
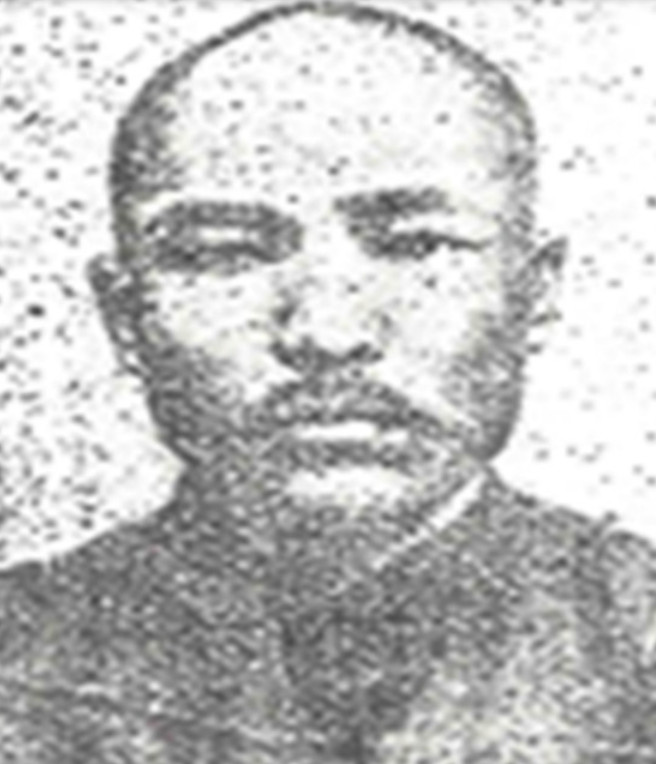
Choi Si-heung, commander of the Cheonmasan Army

On March 1, 1919, Choi Si-heung organized an armed demonstration at the Goryeong Market in Uiju County. There, they stormed into the Japanese garrison with guns and spears, resulting in casualties on both sides. Facing unfavorable circumstances, Choi Si-heung's gathering decided to organize again and cross into Manchuria.

As the March 1st Movement continued to unfold, Choi Si-heung went to Harbin with several others. There, he joined the workers' and peasants' army and worked there until December 12. Choi Si-heung then joined the Kwangbokdan (the provisional government at the time) led by Oh Dong-jin. He later returned to Korea by crossing the Amnok River, gathered his comrades together with Park Eung-baek and others, and officially founded the Cheonmasan Army while declaring himself its commander in March of 1920.

From then on, Choi Si-heung and his comrades traveled throughout Manchuria and Korea. By December, they crossed the Yalu River and arrived in Guseong-gun, where the army recruited more comrades and prepared military supplies. A base was then established on Cheonma Mountain where the army organized personnel, recruited comrades, and raised military funds.

== Organization ==
Location of the Cheonmasan Army Base

In March of 1920, the commander of the army was General Choi Si-heung. The adjutant was Choi Ji-poong. Staff members included Park Eung-baek, Park Young-chan, Choi Yun-hee, inspector Kim Se-jin, company commander Choi Eui-jip, and platoon commanders consisting of captains Kim Sang-ok (金尙玉) and Kim Yong-taek (金龍澤). Choi Si-chan, the younger brother of Commander Choi Si-heung, served in the army as an unranked member and focused on providing financial assistance to Danhoe.

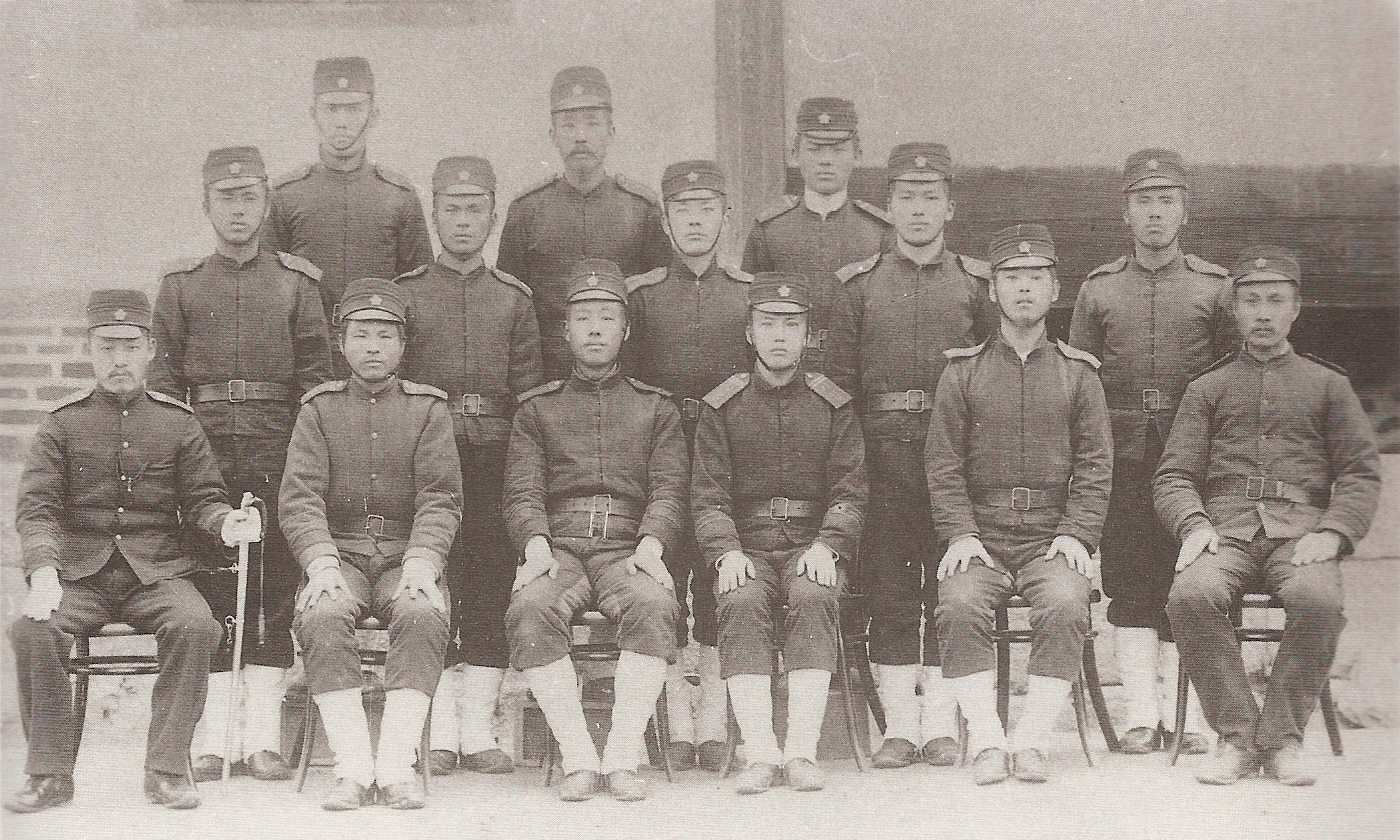
Members of this army were former soldiers of the Imperial Korean Armed Forces

On June 16, 1920, around 130 members gathered for the Cheonmasan Army's military agreement. At the time, the size of the army was around 200 members, mostly young and middle-aged men, many of whom were former soldiers of the Imperial Korean Armed Forces which had disbanded after the Battle of Namdaemun in 1907. (Post-disbandment, some also joined the righteous armies nationwide; these militias spread out in various directions as independent forces and engaged in activities such as fundraising, sabotage of Japanese colonial institutions, execution of Japanese military police and pro-Japanese collaborators, and armed clashes with the Japanese.)

== Engagements ==
Choi Si-heung's army was victorious in many of its engagements, but it also made numerous sacrifices; conventional weaponry additionally limited their capacity in battle. Their engagements primarily happened along the western mountains and mines in the counties of Uiju, Guseong, Sakju, and Changseong in North Pyongan.

The Cheonmasan Army also closely collaborated with many other independence groups, including the Republic of Korea Independence Group in Namman and the Liberation Army in Manchuria, and carried out assassinations, arson, declarations of independence, and military fundraising. In particular, the Cheonmasan Army was seen as effective in their guerrilla warfare operations against the Imperial Japanese Armed Forces and police.

=== 1920 ===
In March of 1920, the Cheonmasan Army attacked the Taesan-myeon office in Seoncheon-gun and killed the village head, Kim Byeong-jun, as well as a clerk named Kim Eun-gi. They also attacked the house of Detective Joo Kyung-cheol and Kim Myeong-ik, ultimately killing them.

On May 9, the Yeohan-myeon office in Cheolsan-gun was attacked and set on fire. On the 18th, a military police officer was killed in Sedok-dong, Sinchang-myeon, Uichang-gun. In the same month, pro-Japanese partisans living in Seoha-dong, Gogwan-myeon, Uiju-gun were executed. Additionally, Park Jeong-hwan (朴貞煥) organized a base in Subok-myeon (水北面), Sakju County, with several soldiers to raise military funds. However, they were eventually surrounded by Japanese and engaged in a battle. Park Jeong-hwan and Choi Yun-ok (崔允玉) were killed; three others were captured.

On June 4, the Cheonmasan Army attacked the police station in Shinan-dong, Gugok-myeon, Sakju-gun, and killed one police officer. On June 6, they attacked the Munok-myeon office in Ganggye-gun and stole 700 won in public funds. On June 10, Kang Chang-heon, the head of Daechang-myeon, Changseong-gun, who had reported on the independence army's actions, was assassinated. Due to this incident, the Sakju Police Station organized a security investigation unit. On June 19, the operation team in Supung-myeon and Deogyu-dong, Sakju-gun, engaged in combat with the 1st squad of the border investigation team; an engagement also happened in Anpung-dong on June 21.

Also in June, several hundred Japanese soldiers invaded through the Saryo Road and attacked the army's main base in Dorongsan (頭龍山). A fierce battle ensued, resulting in the immediate death of three Japanese soldiers. Of the Cheonmasan Army, Heo Gi-ho (許基浩), Dogo Mu (獨孤武), Lee Chang-geun (李昌根), Ryu Tae-sun (柳泰純), and Oh Won-moon (吳元文) were killed, and three were captured. Upon hearing about the situation, comrades who were stationed in Cheonmasan (천마산) rushed to support, but they were unable to arrive in time. They then regrouped back in Cheonmasan to plan a counter-attack. Kim Sang-ok (金尙玉) and five others were sent on a mission to gather scattered comrades in Dorongsan, while Park Yeong-chan (朴泳燦) and two others were sent to Chaman-myeon (外南面) to assassinate a Japanese chief and burn down an administrative office.

On June 28, 28 Cheonmasan Army soldiers fought with the 2nd squad for about 40 minutes; 5 people, including Adjutant Heo Gi-ho, were killed. On the same day, Deputy Officer Choi Ji-pung led around 10 soldiers and attacked and burned down a Japanese police station and administrative office in Oksang-myeon (玉上面), Uiju County. One Japanese soldier was killed. Conversely, the Japanese attack on the army also intensified, and on June 30, 3rd Platoon Commanders Han Seong-ho and Kim Ok-seon were arrested at Mt. Cheonmasan in Goryeongsak-myeon by Assistant Inspector Sasako of the Uiju Police Station and others.

On July 26, the Cheonmasan Army's main base was attacked by about 100 Japanese soldiers. While retreating to Chosan (楚山), the army burned down the Kabyeon administrative office in Bitong-myeon (加別面) of Bitong County and killed two Japanese forest guards in Fusung-dong of Chosan County. They also captured several equipment items including one hunting rifle, 20 bullets, one telescope, and three military knives, among others.

On August 12, about 40 members confronted Assistant Inspector Sasako but retreated due to force majeure. On August 18, soldiers killed Kawabara (川原英二), the chief of patrol at Wonpung Station, and wounded Fujihara (藤原) in Wonpung-dong, Seosam-myeon.

On September 1, in Hantang, Weiwon County, soldiers of the Cheonmasan Army were encircled by Japanese soldiers and had personal belongings confiscated. They then moved to Manchuria and joined the Kwangbokgun Total Headquarters led by General Oh Dong-jin. On September 10, Deputy Officer Choi Ji-pung led a group of seven soldiers and killed one Japanese soldier in Sajigol (砂器洞), Chosan County.

On October 10, Commander Choi Si-heung crossed over to Manchuria and began collaborations with the Gwangbok Army Headquarters.

On December 8, army soldiers returning from a prior engagement ended up engaging in a battle with Assistant Inspector Sasako.

=== 1921 ===
In January 1921, the investigation team tracking the Cheonmasan Army was strengthened and continued to engage them in areas such as Goryeongsak-myeon and Cheonmasan Mountain.

In March 1921, the Cheonmasan Army was surrounded by approximately 100 Japanese soldiers and subsequently engaged in a fierce battle throughout the day, though there were no casualties. The following day, 33 people cut their fingers and formed a blood covenant; based on the public recommendation of the soldiers assembled, Choi Si-heung became the leader charged with destroying a Japanese base. Since the Japanese had set fire to the entire mountain, the Cheonmasan Army moved to Dorongsan in Sakju County.

=== 1922 ===
Lieutenant Choi Ji-pung, in February 1922, led three soldiers on a mission to Yungdong in the northern region of Hwacheon County. The Japanese then attacked them, and Kim Bong-han was killed. Staff Officer Park Eung-baek then led eight soldiers and killed five Japanese soldiers in Daeshang-dong, Gabyeong-myeon, Bichung County.

In March, the army established a camp in Deiryong Pass, Hwagyeong-myeon, Kanggye County. Major Shim Yong-jun then led 11 subordinates and went on a mission to the western region of Hwacheon County. They engaged in battle with the Japanese in Chosan County, Taewon-myeon, during which Kim Myung-jun was killed.

On May 15, Staff Officer Park led 12 soldiers and went on a mission to Gu-myeon, Namyang County, where they killed one Japanese soldier.

In late September, the Cheonmasan Army established a camp in the mountains of Anta-ri, Kanggye County, to wait out the winter and prepare to transport provisions. However, they abandoned their camp and relocated due to attacks. They then rebuilt another camp by digging through accumulated snow of more than 3 meters, after which they spent the winter there.

=== 1923 ===
In early March 1923, the Cheonmasan Army reorganized their weaponry, divided their units, and prepared to mobilize. Platoon Leader Kim Sang-ok attacked the Wenjing garrison in Unsan County with three soldiers, while Major Shim Yong-jun and 5 soldiers clashed with the Japanese in Hwacheon, engaging in battle for about two hours. Meanwhile, Assistant Officer Kim Joon-won fought against the Japanese in Chosan with 7 subordinates. Afterwards, the Cheonmasan Army attacked the Dongcang garrison in Hwacheon but suffered losses due to issues with terrain. Staff Officer Park Eung-baek and 4 soldiers then engaged in a battle with the Japanese, killing five soldiers and injuring seven, in Chenggok Valley, Guyeong-myeon, Namyang County.

In early August, Platoon Leader Kim Sang-ok led five subordinates and engaged in a day-long battle with more than 100 Japanese soldiers near Wenjing in Unsan County. Meanwhile, Assistant Officer Choi Jae-kyung and 4 soldiers killed one Japanese in Handang-myeon, Wiryuan County, after which they acquired one pistol, ammunition, and other items; Staff Officer Park Eung-baek led four subordinates and dealt with public sentiment and raised military funds in the Kanggye region. They engaged in battle for about two hours in Masa-ri, Dongmyeon.

In late August, the entire army was concentrated on the Kanggye region, awaiting the return of Choi Si-heung. They then received urgent news from Special Envoy Lee Han-jun of the Daehan Gwangbok Army Headquarters, prompting immediate planning for support. Platoon Leader Kim Joon-won and his unit remained stationed at the main camp, while two other platoons engaged in a battle with 35 Japanese soldiers for about an hour before defeating them and establishing communication with the Korean Unification Government.

On September 15, the Cheonmasan Army engaged in a battle with the investigation team of the Bukjin Police Station in North Pyongan Province; several soldiers in the opposition forces, including Takamura, were killed. Later, in order to secure an advantageous base, The Cheonmasan Army moved to southern Manchuria and infiltrated the country through Guanzhen and Ji'an.

== Joining the Unification Government ==
In early 1923, an offensive by the Japanese against the Cheonmasan Army resulted several atrocities including Japanese-led attacks and arson against Koreans living in the area and around the army's base.

Afterward, Choi Si-heung moved his army to Yuhahyeon in Manchuria. There, they joined forces with the General Command of the Liberation Army and reorganized into the Cheolmabyeolyeong of the Liberation Army; the army was also incorporated into the Unification Government. Accordingly, the Cheonmasan Army participated in the General Administration of the Liberation Army, the General Staff Headquarters, and the Korean Unification Government; in the latter, they were specifically reorganized into the 3rd Company of the Volunteer Army.

== See also ==
- Korean Independence Movement
  - List of militant Korean independence activist organizations
- Yang Se-bong
- General Staff Headquarters
- Korean Unification Government
- General Camp of the Liberation Army
- Korean Righteous Military Administration Office

== Bibliography ==
- Chae Geun-sik, "History of Armed Independence Movements," 1949, pp. 64–65
- Biography of the Great Cheonma (天摩隊略歷) Independent Newspaper 1923-03 -14
