= General Camp of the Liberation Army =

1920–1921 Korean militant activist group

- Leader: Oh Dong-jin
- Founded: 1920
- Dissolved: 1922
- Country: Korea
- Allegiance: Provisional Government of the Republic of Korea
- Headquarters: Sangando, Ando-hyeon, Jiandao, Jilin Province
- Ideology: Korean independence movement

- General Camp of the Liberation Army
- Hangul: 광복군총영
- Hanja: 光復軍總營
- RR: Gwangbokgun chongyeong
- MR: Kwangbokkun ch'ongyŏng

The General Camp of the Liberation Army (Korean: 광복군총영) was a regional command under the Military Affairs Department of the Provisional Government of the Republic of Korea which was organized in Sangando, Andong Province in 1920. It was formed by integrating the Republican Independence Corps with the Liberation Corps as its core, and it had a different founding entity from the Liberation Army Command, which the Provisional Government of the Republic of Korea intended to establish in Sangando. Prior to the organization of the Liberation Army Command, the General Camp of the Liberation Army had already been established, and thus, the Sangando regional command of the Provisional Government of the Republic of Korea was under the responsibility of the General Camp of the Liberation Army.

== Background ==
Several independence corps in the West Jiandao region, which were organized immediately after the March 1st Movement, showed a move to unite into one to wage a more effective war of independence. It was for this purpose that Cho Byeong-jun and Kim Seong-seong, representatives of the North Pyeongbuk Reading Department, An Yeong-seok and Kim Seong-seong, representatives of the Korean Youth Association, and Kim Seung-hak, representative of the Korean Independence Group, held a meeting in Yeongpyeong, Yeongcheon-gun around December 1919. As a result of the meeting, these representatives resolved to disband each current independent corps and form a unification organization.

In February 1920, Kim Seung-hak, An Byeong-chan, and Lee Tak were dispatched to Shanghai and reported this fact. Accordingly, the Provisional Government decided to establish the Korean Liberation Army, a direct agency of the Provisional Government, in North and South Manchuria, and established as its subsidiary organizations a local government department to supervise civil affairs, a district administration department to supervise military activities, and several military posts, which were independent military camps.

=== Agreement ===
To effectively conduct the independence war, the urgent task above all else was the integration of armed groups from various regions. Recognizing that the Provisional Government of the Republic of Korea should be the subject of integration, Woo Dong-jin immediately initiated the integration movement, with the Korean Youth Association as the main driving force. First, through consultations with officials from the Hanjuhoe, the Great Korean Independence Association, and the Pyeongbuk Governor-General's Office, an agreement was reached on the following five items:

1. Establish a unified agency for coordinating the actions of each organization and carry out operations to destroy domestic administrative institutions of the enemy. These operations should be conducted under the designated name of the Shanghai Provisional Government, rather than under the individual names of each organization.
2. Use the name "Republic of Korea" as the official title.
3. Send representatives to the Provisional Government to report on the situation and request a unification law name.
4. Locate the unification agency at a suitable point along the Yalu River, which borders the domestic and approached areas.
5. The expenses for the unification agency's security should be borne on average by each organization, but special funds from domestic sources should be used to supplement the agency's military expenses.

Based on the above agreement, in the following year, in February 1920, a mechanism for establishing unified contacts with each organization was set up in Hwandien County. Close contact was maintained with the Pyeongbuk Independence Army Headquarters, and activities were carried out. Then, in May of the same year, Kim Seung-hak, Ahn Byeong-chan, and Lee Tak went to Shanghai as representatives to report on the consolidation of the South and North Manchurian independence movements and the establishment of the unification agency. As a result, the Provisional Government made decisions regarding the establishment of the Armed Restoration Army's Department of Participation and Command Headquarters, as well as the establishment of military camps.

In accordance with this decision of the Provisional Government, the Liberation Army was organized in Gwanjeon County in early 1920. As soon as the liberation army was established, it appointed commanders to lead each department. Jo Byeong-jun was appointed as the head of the branch, and Jo Maeng-seon was appointed as the head of the headquarters. He took charge of the position.

== Foundation ==
Around June 1920, the Provisional Government of the Republic of Korea in Shanghai received information that a large-scale tour group consisting of US senators, congressmen, and their families, totaling 123 people, planned to visit Korea via the Philippines and China. The group included three members of the US Senate, 39 members of the House of Representatives, and 74 family members, among others. Their itinerary was scheduled to depart from the United States in July 1920, pass through the Philippines and China, and arrive in Korea on August 24.

The Provisional Government saw this as an excellent opportunity to raise awareness of the reality of colonial Korea and appeal for Korean independence. With An Chang-ho at the center, they focused on formulating a response plan to the visit of the US delegation. As a result, key measures were planned, including submitting a "petition" during the delegation's visit to China, appealing for Korean independence, and organizing protest movements mobilizing the people upon the delegation's arrival in Korea.

Coincidentally, in Shanghai, Yi Takh, the leader of the Korean Restoration Army (Daehan Gwangbokdan), was staying. Upon hearing the news of the US delegation's visit, An Chang-ho met with Yi Takh and asked if they could mobilize the youth in Andong (modern-day Dandong, China) for propaganda activities.

"When the US delegation enters Korea, we want to organize a protest movement. Can we mobilize the youth in Manchuria?" "No problem. I will personally go to Manchuria and deliver the plan."

Yi Takh readily agreed to mobilize his Liberation Corps members for the cause of "national salvation". He immediately sent a letter to Oh Dong-jin, who was serving as the acting leader of Liberation Corps, to relay the orders of the provisional government. The order was to organize a military force responsible for "actual combat actions" with the aim of Korean independence.

In July 1920, in Sangando, Andong Province (安東縣), the Liberation Corps, led by Yi Duk (이탁) and Oh Dong-jin (오동진), was integrated with the Min'guk Independence Corps (민국독립단) to organize the General Camp of the Liberation Army.

In August 1920, the Provisional Government of the Republic of Korea established the Liberation Army Command as a regional command under the Military Affairs Department (군무부) in Sangando (西間島) Province 1. However, it was already preceded by the establishment of the General Camp of the Liberation Army about a month earlier in July in Sangando. Subsequently, the actual regional command of the Provisional Government of the Republic of Korea that operated in Sangando was the General Camp of the Liberation Army.

== Organization ==
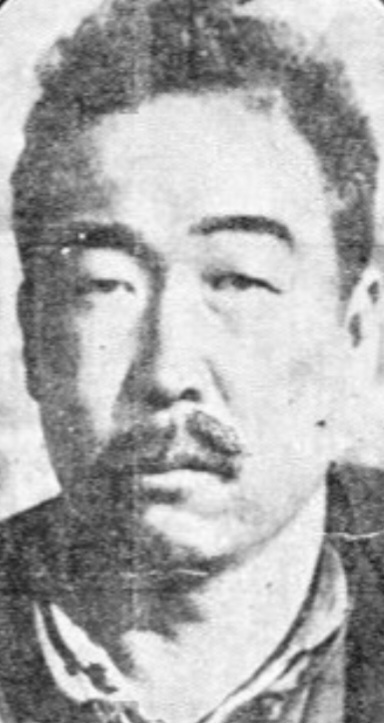
Oh Dong-jin, commander of the General Camp of the Liberation Army.

The Army was organized as a special unit to composed of all armed anti-Japanese groups in South and North Manchuria to carry out only military purposes shortly after the headquarters of the Liberation Army was organized. In other words, the activities of each military camp of the Liberation Army, which was dispersed in various places, were reduced due to Japanese surveillance and oppression, and communication between units became difficult. It operated as an independent organization under the direct jurisdiction of the Military Affairs Department of the Provisional Government of the Republic of Korea. The organizational structure consisted of three departments: the Military Department, the Advisory Department, and the Finance Department, all under the command of the General Headquarters. Under the Advisory Department, there was a military camp (군영). In Articles 4 to 5, it was stipulated that members should be between 18 and 50 years old and have rights and obligations similar to military regulations.

=== Military Council ===
The members of the General Camp of the Liberation Army were selected through their own military council.

==== First Council ====
Commander: Jo Mong-seon, Deputy Commander: Yoo Chun-geun, Chief of Staff: Lee Do, Military Government and Bureau Chief: Kim Seung-hak, Military Law Bureau Chief: Ryu Yeong-ha, Military Discipline Bureau Chief: Park Il-ryeok, Provisioning Bureau Chief: Hong Jik, Information Bureau Chief: Yang Gi-ha, Training Bureau Chief: Yeo Sun-geun.

==== Second Council ====
In the second regular meeting in August 1922 were Oh Dong-jin as the Commander (총영장), Baek Nam-jun as the Military Department Chief and Chief of Staff (군사부장 겸 참모부장), and Lee Gwan-rin as the Finance Department Chief (경리부장).

In a situation like this, Oh Dong-jin, the second warrant officer of the Liberation Army, led the troops under his command and was stationed in Gwanjeon-hyeon, and renamed his unit to the Liberation Army of Chongyeong. Oh Dong-jin was appointed as the Commander-in-Chief of the Liberation Army, and Jo Byeong-jun, the head of the accounting department, was appointed as the head of the accounting department. Meanwhile, the Cheonmasan Army in Korea was called the Liberation Army, and the armed groups active in the coastal areas of Bokpo and Bogyejiang were called Seokpo, and they actively fought against the Japanese military and police.

=== Units ===
Furthermore, the Cheonmasan Army (천마산대) within the country was designated as the Iron Horse Separate Camp (철마별영), with Choi Si-heung appointed as the Camp Commander (별영장). The armed groups along the Byeokdong (벽동) and Pajeo River (파저강) coasts were designated as the Byeokpa Separate Camp (벽파별영), with Kim Young-hwa appointed as the Camp Commander. As a military organization under the Provisional Government, the General Camp of the Liberation Army, which carried out anti-Japanese warfare, engaged in 78 skirmishes with the Japanese military and police in 1920, raided 56 Japanese military posts, burned down myeon offices and Yeongrimchang in 20 locations, and killed 95 Japanese police officers. They carried out domestic guerrilla operations targeting the administrative bodies of the Governor General of Korea and police stations in regions such as Anju, Shinuiju, and Seoncheon.

In addition to the independence army units mentioned above, the Korean Korean Righteous Military Administration Office based in Ando-hyeon (奶頭山), the Yeojeon and Yeongjeon areas of the Middle East Line in northern Manchuria, the Reiji area around Hunchun, and the Gwangju area of Western Jiandao. Numerous independence corps, including the Taeju Army and the Baeksan Army Corps, were organized in the Manchuria and Primorsky Krai from 1919 to 1920 and operated under the slogan of a war of independence against Japanese imperialism.

== Military Camps ==
Military camps were established in various regions for the training of the Independence Army and for the destruction of the Japanese imperial army, police, and administrative institutions. These six military camps were formed as practical armed units directly engaged in resistance against the Japanese. The responsible individuals for the six military camps were as follows: 1st Camp Commander: Byun Chang-geun, 2nd Camp Commander: Oh Dong-jin, 3rd Camp Commander: Hong Jik, 4th Camp Commander: Choi Si-hyeong, 5th Camp Commander: Choi Chan, 6th Camp Commander: Kim Chang-gun. According to the regulations of the General Camp of the Liberation Army established at that time, the location of the General Camp of the Liberation Army was in Kwanjeon County, but the regulations stipulated that the General Camp should be established in Seoul, and the provinces should establish Provincial Camps, and the counties should establish County Camps in major military locations. Therefore, it seems that the emphasis was placed on domestic organizations when planning the General Camp.

The strongest unit among the six local military forces was the 2nd Battalion, commanded by Wu Dong-jeong. The core members of the 2nd Battalion were the members of the Guangji Youth Group, which Oh Dong-jin formed immediately after arriving in Korea. They were elite individuals armed with a strong anti-Japanese spirit.

Since the Korean Liberation Army Headquarters at the time was composed of leaders from various fields, it was inefficient as a fighting force. Therefore, it was inevitable to reorganize it into a powerful combat corps. As a result, in July of the same year, the General Camp of the Liberation Army was established as the vanguard unit responsible for the front line of the Independence War. Wu Dong-jeong, who led the strongest elite unit, was appointed as the commander of the General Camp, Lee Duk was appointed as the Chief of Staff, and Jo Mong-seon was appointed as the Director of the Management Department. (Note: Note: Wu Dong-ji, the commander of the General Camp, used all of his personal assets to purchase weapons and strengthen the organization.)

=== Organizations of the Camps ===
In Articles 6 to 10, the main camp was divided into four parts: the General Camp, Provincial Camps, County Camps, and Separate Camps. Based on the content, Provincial Camps were to be established in provinces with five or more County Camps, County Camps were to be established in counties with 10 to 100 organizations, and Separate Camps were to be established in fortified areas organized into 10 to 100 combat units. The General Camp was to have a Military Department, a Staff Department, and a Finance Department to handle administrative affairs. In Articles 11 to 14, the personnel of the General Camp, Provincial Camps, County Camps, and Separate Camps were specified.

The departments and organizations of each camp are as follows:

- General Camp: General Camp Commander (1 person), Secretary (2 people), Military Department Chief (1 person), Assistant Officers (a few)
- Staff Department Chief (1 person), Staff Officers (a few), Finance Department Chief (1 person), Accountants (a few)
- Provincial Camps: Provincial Camp Commander (1 person), Secretary (2 people), Military Department Chief (1 person), Assistant Officers (2 people)
- Staff Department Chief (1 person), Staff Officers (5 people), Finance Department Chief (1 person), Accountants (3 people)
- County Camps: County Camp Commander (1 person), Assistant Officers (2 people), Staff Officers (3 people), Accountants (2 people)
- Separate Camps: Separate Camp Commander (1 person), Assistant Officers (2 people), Staff Officers (3 people)

In terms of organization, a squad leader was appointed for every 10 members, a platoon leader for every 10 squad leaders, a special operations unit leader above the platoon leader for every 10 platoon leaders, a Provincial Camp above the special operations unit leader for every 13 Provincial Camps, and a General Camp above the Provincial Camps for the 13 provinces. In addition, the General Camp was authorized to establish special operations agencies under its jurisdiction at important domestic and foreign locations. Note: The domestic camp plan shown in the regulations of the General Camp of the Liberation Army was similar to the domestic headquarters and division establishment plan of the Korean Independence Army, and it organized Provincial Camps and County Camps within the country with the aim of leading the national liberation war to victory through joint domestic and foreign efforts. Therefore, after July 1920, Oh Dong-jin also promoted the establishment of military camps within the country and distributed warning messages to urge vigilance among those working for enemy institutions and the general public. Note: However, these plans by Oh Dong-jin for domestic activities were difficult to realize because of the strict surveillance and brutal suppression by the Japanese invaders at that time. Therefore, after the establishment of the General Camp of the Liberation Army, General Camp Officers such as Xu Fenggen and Kim Deokhu attempted to organize County Camps and Provincial Camps in Anju County and Pyeongwon County in Pyongan Province, and Zhao Changlong and Lee Huidao attempted to organize County Camps in Shingi County in Hwanghae Province.

== Pyongyang Bomb Squad ==
The first mission assigned to the Korean General Camp of the Liberation Army was "multiple acts of resistance within the country". They aimed to demonstrate the will of the Korean people for independence by carrying out acts of resistance such as bombing government offices and assassinating officials in Seoul, Pyongyang, Seoncheon, Shinuiju, and other locations, coinciding with the visit of the US congressional delegation.

The operation was carried out on a large scale, with the cooperation of the voluntary corps organized by the Provisional Government. The bombs used were 12 explosives produced by the Korean Independence Adventure Corps in Shanghai, transported by Im Deok-san to Yi Ryung-yang's store in Andong (now Dandong, China), and then secretly distributed to various regional units of the voluntary corps within the country. The General Camp of the Liberation Army, in charge of the operation, organized four bomb squads as follows and dispatched them to the country. Moon Il-min was assigned the mission of infiltrating Pyongyang as part of the Pyongyang Bomb Squad. According to the "Memoirs of Moon Il-min" held by his family, at the time, Moon Il-min was in a position to lead the members as the leader of the Pyongyang Bomb Squad. However, there are also records claiming that Park Tae-yeol or Jang Deok-jin was the leader, so it is not clear who exactly held the position of leader.

In mid-July 1920 (late May according to the lunar calendar), the Pyongyang Bomb Squad departed after seeing off the Seoul Bomb Squad. They carried three bombs, four pistols, and 300 rounds of ammunition, crossing the Yalu River by boat from Antung Headquarters. The infiltrating members in Korea moved through treacherous mountain paths without attracting the attention of the Japanese. Although they had some money, the severe famine made it difficult to buy food. They managed their hunger by relying on corn and continued their journey towards Pyongyang. There was a potential conflict that could have escalated into a major fight when one member of the group got into an argument, but thanks to Ahn Gyeong-shin's intervention, who advised the members to refrain from letting minor anger hinder their courage, it ended as a minor incident. In this way, the members successfully passed through Uiju, Sakkju, and Guseong, and on the morning of July 30, they entered Anju, South Pyongan Province, without major incidents.

The unexpected crisis came upon the members. They encountered the Chinilpa on the street. The members first sent Ahn Gyeong-shin and the guide ahead and followed at a casual pace, pretending to be unrelated. That's when it happened. The collaborators stopped the members and asked about their whereabouts, attempting to search their bodies. They were collaborators Kudo Sojabu (宮東宗三郞), a collaborator working at the Anju Police Station's Yongheung branch, and Kim Myung-gyun (金明均), a Chinilpa. At that moment, Jang Deok-jin quickly pulled out a pistol from his pocket and aimed it at six different spots, including Kudo's face, firing bullets. Due to the sudden gunfire, Kudo died on the spot. He also shot at Kim Myung-gyun, but he managed to escape and wasn't killed. There were also collaborators' assistants who were following them. However, without any intention of responding, they fled while shouting, "We repent!" "We will never collaborate again!" Their screams even made the members smirk. "We are the Korean Liberation Army, people who punish the enemy. Our fellow countrymen can rest assured!" After reassuring the startled residents who witnessed the sudden gunfire, Moon Il-min and his group changed clothes at a nearby farmhouse to evade police pursuit and urged to continue their journey.

Finally, the bomb squad successfully infiltrated Pyongyang. Upon entering Pyongyang, they encountered another person suspected to be an investigator, but the members' demeanor was so inconspicuous that they didn't attract any attention.

Unfortunately, three days before the U.S. congressmen's arrival in Seoul, on the night of August 20, Kim Yeong-cheol and his group were arrested by enemy police, and they were not only captured, but their bombs, guns, and numerous documents, including urgent warning letters, were seized. Thus, the plan for operations in Seoul was not accomplished. However, these events chilled the negotiations with the enemy and had a significant impact both domestically and internationally. Moreover, the swift infiltration and bold activities of Kim Yeong-cheol, Ahn Gyeongshin, Jang Deokjin, and others were commendable achievements that amazed and inspired many people.

== Infiltration Operation ==
The most intense battle conducted by the Oh Dongjin Battalion was the so-called "infiltration operation" where they entered the domestic territory and attacked and destroyed the Japanese colonial institutions. Through this operation, mainly targeting Japanese police stations, the colonial rule in the border regions was effectively paralyzed. Some of the notable attacks led by the Oh Dongjin Battalion include the Bichong Police Station, Sanseju Office in Sinsiju, Guanhui Office, Xiaogui Office, Heuchang County Dongxing Office, Chusan Yinglin Factory Office, and Changsanju Office in Maosan County. They also assassinated pro-Japanese officials such as the Heuchang County Magistrate and Jicheng County Magistrate, leading to the voluntary resignation of Korean officials in the border areas. Additionally, individuals like Moon Hak-bin, Kong Ju-hwan, and Lee Nung-hak were dispatched to Pyeongbuk, Yeokdong Province, to recruit military funds and support the cause.

The units under the command of the General Camp of the Liberation Army engaged in numerous battles with Japanese defense units while operating domestically. Battles took place primarily near the Korean-Manchurian border in places like Uiju, Yongjeon, Yeokdong, Jaseong, Changseong, Yeongwon, Ganggye, and Gapsan. Although they suffered significant losses in these battles, the sacrifices made by the independence forces were also substantial.

The independence forces under the command of Oh Dong-jin, including the General Camp of the Liberation Army, consisted of two units: the Tianmao Regiment and the Bibo Regiment. Among them, the activities of the Tianmao Regiment were particularly unique in the history of armed independence movements. While most independent forces were based in Manchuria, the Tianmao Regiment used Tianma Mountain in Shuoshou County, Pyeongbuk, as their base and conducted armed activities from 1919, achieving remarkable accomplishments.

Recognizing the need for organizing domestic branches during the establishment of the General Camp of the Liberation Army, Oh Dong-jin called upon Cui Shixing, who was commanding the Tianmao Regiment, to join the General Headquarters. They agreed that the Tianmao Regiment would become the General Headquarters' domestic unit. Afterward, the Tianmao Regiment became a prominent unit under the General Headquarters and continued to engage in anti-Japanese battles in the border areas of Pyeongbuk, Gwicheong, Ganggye, Hwacheon, Hwacheon, and Namyuan, dealing a critical blow to the Japanese defense along the Pyeongbuk-Korean border.

== Joining the Korea Unification Government ==
In 1922, when the unification organization of the independent armed groups in Sangando was established as the Korean Unification Government, the General Camp of the Liberation Army was dismantled as part of the progressive development.

== See also ==
- Korean Independence Movement
  - List of militant Korean independence activist organizations
- Provisional Government of the Republic of Korea
- Korean Unification Government
