= Righteous Government =

1929–1931 Korean self-governing area

- 1924–1929
- Flag

- Location of Liuhe County (red) in Tonghua (yellow)
- Status: Historically unrecognized autonomous prefecture
- Capital: Liuhe Town (de facto)
- Common languages: Korean
- Demonym: Korean
- Government: Autonomous self-governing cooperative organization
- Chairman
  - 1924 - 1929: Lee Tak
- Legislature: County Citizens' Representative Council
- Historical era: Interwar period
  - Established: November 1924
  - Disestablished: 1929

Population
  - 1926: 76,800
Preceded by	Succeeded by
Korean Unification Government	National People's Government
- Today part of: China

Korean name
- Hangul: 정의부
- Hanja: 正義府
- RR: Jeonguibu
- MR: Chŏngŭibu

The Righteous Government (Korean: 정의부) was an anti-Japanese armed independence movement organization and military government organized in West Jiandao in 1924 through the unification movement of Korean independence groups in Manchuria and as an autonomous organization for Koreans. Yang Gi-tak, Kim Dong-sam, and Ji Cheong-cheon founded its base in the Bongcheon and Jilin provinces. In the mid-1920s, leaders of the Korean independence movement in Manchuria hoped for a grand unification of the independence groups for a more effective anti-Japanese armed struggle. Accordingly, the leaders held several meetings since 1923 and promoted the integration of various organizations. The Righteous Government was established around the same time the General Staff Headquarters, and the Korean People's Association in Manchuria. It is referred to as the third prefecture along with others, and was an organization that led the independence movement in Manchuria in the mid to late 1920s.

== Background ==
After the Battle of Cheongsanri in 1920, the independence movement in Manchuria and Primorsky Krai was dispersed and stagnated due to the Japanese army's Gando Massacre and the Free City Incident. The independence fighters who returned to Manchuria pursued integration with the independence movement organizations that remained in Manchuria, and in February 1922, independence movement organizations in the western Jiandao region, including the Korean Independence Corps and the Seoro Military Government, held a conference on unification. An agreement was reached on the formation of the Unification Military Government. Then, in August 1922, more organizations participated and it expanded into Korean Unification Government, integrating organizations such as the Northern Military Administration Office and the Korean Independence Association. Afterwards, as it expanded and developed into the Department of Korean Tongui (大韓統義府) in Western Jiandao. However, from the beginning of Tonguibu's establishment, ideological conflict continued between monarchists and republicans. As Unification Government was divided and weakened, Yang Gi-tak, along with the leaders of the West Jiandao independence movement, Lee Jang-nyeong, Ji Cheong-cheon, and Son Il-min, promoted the unification of the Manchurian independence movement groups. Division occurred within the leading force, some of the Unification Government volunteer army, who felt skeptical about the internal division and conflict, left the Unification Government in May 1924 and formed the General Staff Headquarters as a direct branch of the Provisional Government of the Republic of Korea. On July 10, 1924, an inaugural meeting of the Jeonman Unification Association was held in Jilin, and then a plenary session was held on October 18, and Kim Dong-sam (金東三) was elected as chairman.

== History ==
Representatives from the Korean Unification Government, Military Government Office, Gwangjeongdan, Uiwudan, Jilin Residents' Association, Labor Friendship Association, Advocates' Association, Gobongye, etc. As a result of holding a unified conference in Liuhe County, the Righteous Government, an independence movement federation, was created in November 1924. And although some groups withdrew during the meeting, eventually 25 representatives from eight groups agreed to form the Righteous Government as a union of independence movement groups on December 25, 1924. Central administrative committee members include Lee Tak, Oh Dong-jin, Hyeon Jeong-gyeong, Kim I-dae, Yun Deok-bo, Kim Yong-dae, Lee Jin-san, and Kim Hyeong-sik. (Kim Hyeong-seok), Ji Cheong-cheon, etc. were elected. The Righteous Government insisted on focusing on the economy, industry, and education and working toward independence.

After its founding, the charter and declaration were announced and members of the autonomy, military, education, finance, and livelihood subcommittees were appointed, and the central administrative committee members included Lee Tak, Oh Dong-jin, Hyeon Jeong-gyeong, and Kim I-dae. The organization was completed by electing Kim Dae-dae, Yun Deok-bo, and Ji Cheong-cheon.

Next, with headquarters in Yuha-hyeon, the Central Committee was organized in March 1925, with the following members: Central Administrative Committee Chairman Lee Tak, civil affairs Hyeon Jeong-gyeong, propaganda Lee Jong-geon, treasurer Kim I-dae, military Ji Cheong-cheon, legal affairs Lee Jin-san, and academic affairs Kim Yong-dae. Chairman Kim Yeong-dae, transportation Yoon Deok-bo, livelihood Oh Dong-jin, and diplomacy Kim Dong-sam were appointed.

In July of the same year, Lee Sang-ryong, an official of the Bureau of Justice and Military Prefecture, was appointed to the State Council of the Shanghai Provisional Government, and a coalition cabinet centered on the anti-Japanese independence movement groups in Manchuria was established. However, the Manchurian independence movement, which did not highly evaluate the provisional government, As the sculpture failed due to groups' refusal to take office, Lee Sang-ryong resigned from his position as head of state in February of the following year.

As controversy arose, such as a conflict between the Central Administrative Committee and the Central Council, over this issue, Lee Hae-ryong, chairman of the Standing Committee of the Central Council, organized the Righteous Government County and People's Representative Council as an emergency measure in January 1926, and made resolutions. Then he proclaimed and established a new charter.

In October of the same year, the Righteous Government held the 3rd Central Council, restored the civilian administration from the County and Citizens' Representative Council, and revised the charter. From this time on, the Righteous Government took into account the realistic conditions of independence movement groups, refrained from military action, and focused on promoting food production and industry.

Jeong Yi-hyeong, Yang Gi-tak, Hyeon Jeong-gyeong, and Oh Dong-jin, who were participating in the Righteous Government, agreed that a core group was needed to systematically lead the independence movement. So, they contacted Lee Gyu-poong and Joo Jin-su from Noryeong, Kim Bong-guk and Lee Dong-rak from the Korean Revolutionary Committee, Cheondogyo reformists from Korea, and Lee Dong-gu from Hyeongpyeongsa. So, the Korean Revolutionary Party was organized in Jilin Province in April 1926.

However, the Korean Revolutionary Party was unable to realize its ideals due to ideological conflict between nationalists and socialists within the party. In the end, members of the nationalist camp continued to defect from the party, and Joo Jin-soo and Lee Kyu-poong returned to the Soviet Union. Moreover, when Lee Dong-rak was arrested in December 1926, he had Korean Revolutionary Party documents and the names of officials were on the documents. Based on this, Japan launched a large-scale arrest operation. By December of the following year, 15 key executives, including Oh Dong-jin, chairman of the Military Committee of the Righteous Government Jeong I-hyeong, and Lee Dong-gu, were caught by the Japanese police and were disbanded.

From late 1926, a movement for a single national party developed within China, and around Ahn Chang-ho's visit to Manchuria in January 1927, the integration of the three branches was promoted as part of the movement for a single national party in Manchuria as well. However, differences of opinion and division arose over the direction and content of that integration. A three-part integrated conference was held under the auspices of theRighteous Government in September 1928, but the conference was discontinued in November as differences of opinion could not be resolved. Then, in December 1928, Kim Dong-sam, Ji Ji-cheon, and Kim Won-sik withdrew from the Righteous Government and formed the Innovation Council (革新議會) by merging with the Korean People's Association in Manchuria military faction and the General Staff Headquarters secession faction. Meanwhile, the remaining majority faction of the Righteous Government united with the civilian government faction of the Korean People's Association in Manchuria and the remaining forces of the Righteous Government and organized the National People's Prefecture on April 1, 1929.

== Governance ==
The Righteous Government can be divided into central organization, local organization, and military organization. In this way, the Righteous Government can carry out autonomous and military activities. In the beginning, the Ministry of Justice focused on civil affairs activities to establish an economic foundation for the people under its jurisdiction, and in the case of military organization, it maintained an organization based on the existing Tonguibu volunteer army. The activities of the Ministry of Justice can be divided into civil affairs activities and military activities. All independence movement groups in the Gando region led the autonomous activities of the Korean community in Manchuria, fostering the foundation for the independence movement, and at the same time carrying out armed struggle activities.

=== Charter ===
On November 24, 1924, 25 representatives of eight organizations, including the Military Government Office, Jilin Residents' Association, Daehan Gwangjeongdan, Korean Independence Corps, Daehan Tonguibu, Labor Friendship Association, Uiseongdan, Japryun Autonomous Association, and Gobongye, created the Righteous Government and announced a charter and declaration. The characteristics of the new charter were the adoption of a modern constitutional system of separation of powers, cabinet responsibility system, and local autonomy system. After the establishment of the Military and People's Representative Council, the military faction of the Righteous Government increased, and armed resistance became important. The declaration announced by the Ministry of Justice stated that it would strive for the economy, industry, and education, and to complete the cause of liberation for independence. It was an attempt to restore the unstable Korean community in Manchuria and the independence movement front by forming a joint organization. The Jeonman Unification Association said:

1. The name of the organization is Righteous Government.
2. The name of the era is decided to be the origin of the founding nation.
3. The system has district councils, local councils, and central councils as parliamentary institutions.
4. The charter is passed in Chapter 6, Article 88.
5. Each organization prepares a name cancellation statement and promulgates it with the signature of the representative of each organization.
6. The affairs of each group shall be transferred to the Ministry of Justice within two full months from the closing date of the association.
7. A temporary administrative executive committee will be established to temporarily carry out government affairs before the formal Central Administrative Committee is established.' etc. were announced as resolutions.

=== Central Organization ===
In March 1925, the Righteous Government established a central organization in Samwonpo, Yuha-hyeon with a system of separation of three powers (legislation, judiciary, and administration). The Central Administrative Committee; Chairman Lee Tak. The Propaganda Committee; Lee Jong-geon, the Central Judgment Committee; Lee Jin-san, the Civil Affairs Committee; Hyeon Jeong-gyeong, the Military Committee; Ji Cheong-cheon, the Legal Affairs Committee, the Academic Affairs Committee; Kim Yong-dae, the Finance Committee; Kim I-dae, the Transportation Committee; Yoon Deok-bo, the Livelihood Committee; Oh Dong-jin, and the Foreign Affairs Committee; Kim Dong-sam, as well as the Central Council and a volunteer army that carried out armed activities.

The central organization of the Righteous Government was formed around the incident in which Lee Sang-ryong (李相龍), who participated in the Bureau of Justice and Military Prefecture, was elected as the head of state of the Provisional Government of the Republic of Korea in July 1925. This disintegrating problem occurred. Those who supported the provisional government broke away from the Tonguibu, one of the organizations that formed the Bureau of Justice and Military Prefecture, and formed the Army Advisory Office, and there was a conflict over the issue of support for the provisional government in the Jeonman Unification Association, which gathered to organize the Bureau of Justice and Military Prefecture. However, after the collapse of the National Representative Conference in 1923, the leadership of the Provisional Government in Manchurian society greatly declined, and the leadership of the Bureau of Justice and Military Prefecture had a poor relationship with the Provisional Government of the Republic of Korea. Accordingly, some of the Bureau of Justice and Military Prefecture criticized Lee Sang-ryong's inauguration of the Provisional Government's State Council, and this difference of opinion led to the disintegration of the Central Administrative Committee and the Central Council of the Bureau of Justice and Military Prefecture due to a vote of no confidence in each other.

=== Legislature ===
In order to resolve the situation in which the functions of both the administrative and legislative institutions were paralyzed due to the collapse, the County Citizens' Representative Council was held in January 1926 under the name of Lee Hae-ryong, chairman of the standing committee of the Central Council of the Prefecture. The County Citizens' Representative Council revised and promulgated the Bureau of Justice and Military Prefecture Charter and elected new central administrative members. At this time, armed resistance was emphasized as the military faction took over the leadership, but later, when the 3rd Central Council was held in October 1926, civil administration was restored from the County and People's Representative Council.

=== Local Organization ===
The local organization of the Righteous Government had jurisdiction over the Korean community in southern Manchuria. It had jurisdiction over Koreans residing in about 40 counties south of Harbin and carried out civil affairs activities to support their livelihoods. They established a local organizations such as general district, region, hundred households, and ten households in the Korean community, and overseeing the immigrant Korean community. Based on these organizations, the prefecture carried out industrial revival, media, and education activities, and organized a volunteer army under its umbrella to wage an armed struggle against Japan. The Righteous Government established local organizations in Tonghua, Hwanin, Gwanjeon, Jian, Linjiang, Jangbaek, and Yuha County.

Regions and districts were organized at the lower level. A general office was established in each region, in villages where Koreans were concentrated, a general district was established by grouping 1,000 Korean households into one unit, and under that, there was a local organization where 500 households were appointed as local heads, 100 households as 100 heads, 50 households as wards, and 10 households as 10 head heads. The area under the jurisdiction of Bureau of Justice and Military Prefecture expanded further in 1926, with 76,800 Koreans living in 15,300 households. Based on this local organization, the Righteous Government was the local government of the Korean community in Manchuria and had the characteristics of a quasi-national autonomous body.

=== Military ===
Based on these autonomous activities, the Righteous Government carried out an armed struggle for independence. In particular, after the formation of the Military and People's Representative Council in January 1926, it actively carried out guerrilla warfare into the country and destruction of Japanese ruling institutions in Manchuria. Based on the Tonguibu volunteer army, the armed forces of the Seogunjeongseo, Uiseongdan, and Gwangjeongdan were combined to establish a system of five companies and a military police force. After the People's Congress, the armed struggle was strengthened and the military organization was newly organized into six companies. Based on this military organization, the Righteous Government Volunteer Army entered the country and carried out armed activities, waging guerrilla warfare. In Manchuria, activities were carried out to raise military funds, assassinate pro-Japanese collaborators, and protect Koreans in the jurisdiction.

On the other hand, the volunteer army for the purpose of armed activities is in China. Not only were they active within Manchuria, but they were also active in entering Korea across borders. Before entering the Korea, they organized a guerrilla force and attacked Japanese military and police posts in Hamgyeong-do and Pyeongan-do and carried out military fund-raising activities. Based on this, the Bureau of Justice and Military Prefecture volunteer army carried out guerrilla warfare entering the country and carried out activities to protect Koreans under its jurisdiction. They were dispatched to each region and carried out activities under the names of adventure corps, assassination corps, security corps, and parent regiment. They were active until the late 1920s on the stage of Namman. The Bureau of Justice and Military Prefecture participated in the national unity party movement that began in early 1927, and most of the members were based in southern Manchuria.

== Economy ==
The Righteous Government carried out industrial revival activities in various fields, including drawing up a plan to establish a limited agricultural corporation, investing in farm business, and promoting the formation of a farmer-housing company, a rural management model in the form of an agricultural cooperative. Heungup Industrial Company was established, while local administrative organizations such as the Farmers' Association and Farmers' Protection Agency were strengthened. Therefore, the Righteous Government primarily paid attention to industrial revival activities, especially agricultural issues. As an agricultural stimulus measure, the public farming system and the family farming system for communal farming were implemented to raise public farming profits and loan the proceeds to residents as agricultural funds. In addition, trade unions were established in rural areas so that Koreans could develop industries in the spirit of mutual assistance.

From the beginning of its establishment, the Righteous Government raised profits from public farming by implementing the public farming system and the family farming system to improve the economic status of Koreans living in Manchuria, and launched a project to lend the proceeds as agricultural funds. He also established coeducational elementary schools as compulsory educational institutions and established Hwaheung Middle School (化興中學) and Dongmyeong Middle School (東明中學). He also established Hwaseong Uisuk (華成義塾) to train revolutionary cadres.

=== Agriculture ===
the Bureau of Justice and Military Prefecture focused on improving the unstable economic situation of Koreans living in Manchuria from the beginning of its establishment. Since the Korean community in Manchuria was the basis of the independence movement, it devoted itself to the promotion and education of agriculture and commerce by improving the lives of residents and maintaining order for the purpose of achieving independence.

With an organization like the Righteous Government, the most important thing that was focused on for Koreans under the jurisdiction was industrial revival activities for the survival of the people. From March 1925, the Righteous Government implemented a public farming system. The public agricultural system was to use the profits from public farming to purchase basketballs and rent them out to Koreans, while the remaining amount was loaned out as agricultural funds at low interest rates.

The Righteous Government established the general rules of the rural community and established a common fund at each village level. Based on this, it was possible to purchase agricultural equipment that could be used jointly and to provide loans for farming funds. In places with sufficient funds, farmland was purchased and cultivated jointly to generate income.

== Education ==
The Righteous Government also worked on educational activities to strengthen the national capabilities of Koreans living in Manchuria. They implemented common education and established co-educational elementary schools as compulsory educational institutions. They established schools such as elementary schools, (girls') middle schools such as the Hwaheung Middle School, Dongmyeong Middle School, and Hwaseong Middle School. They also established vocational schools, and teacher's schools were created to provide ethnic education to Korean children, while also providing vocational education to help them adapt to society By establishing middle schools and other institutions, in addition to general education, they focused on military education and ideological and cultural enlightenment to train revolutionary cadres. They promoted the compilation of textbooks to be used in schools and also resolved to reform the education system and expand schools.As part of the journalistic activities and media activities to promote national consciousness, he published newspapers such as the "Righteous Government Gazette", "Central News Agency", "Daedong Minbo", and "Xinhua Minbo", as well as the magazine "Comrades".

== Joining the National People's Prefecture ==
From late 1926, a movement for a single national party developed within China, and around Ahn Chang-ho's visit to Manchuria in January 1927, the integration of the three branches was promoted as part of the movement for a single national party in Manchuria as well. However, differences of opinion and division arose over the direction and content of that integration. A three-part integrated conference was held under the auspices of the Righteous Government in September 1928, but the conference was discontinued in November as differences of opinion could not be resolved. Then, in December 1928, Kim Dong-sam, Ji Cheon-cheon, and Kim Won-sik withdrew from the Jeonguibu and formed the Innovation Council (革新議會) by merging with the Shinminbu military government faction and the General Staff Headquarters secession faction. Meanwhile, the remaining majority faction of the Jeonguibu united with the civilian government faction of the Shinminbu and the remaining forces of the Chamuibu and organized the Kukminbu (國民府) on April 1, 1929.

Afterwards, in February 1928, the executives of the Righteous Government, the General Staff Headquarters, and the Korean People's Association in Manchuria gathered at Ningguta (寧古塔, present-day Ning'an) and decided to hold a meeting of developing the national unity party movement. Then, in May, 39 representatives of 18 independence movement groups in Manchuria gathered in Panshi County, Jilin Province to discuss the issue of forming a single party. However, it was divided into the National Unity Party Organization Promotion Association, which denied the established organizations, and the National Unity Party Organization Council, which insisted on the originality of the established organizations.

Afterwards, the Righteous Government, the central force in the council, launched an unification movement with the General Staff Headquarters and the Korean People's Association in Manchuria, but failed to achieve complete integration. However, the civil affairs faction of the Korean People's Association in Manchuria and some forces of General Staff Headquarters combined to form the National People's Prefecture in 1929 and disbanded the three groups. Meanwhile, the Chokseonghoe side was in conflict with the National People's Prefecture side by organizing an innovation council centered on the military government faction of the Korean People's Association in Manchuria, a part of the Righteous Government, and the main force of the Army Advisory Office.

== See also ==
- Korean Independence Movement
  - List of militant Korean independence activist organizations
- General Staff Headquarters
- Korean People's Association in Manchuria
- National People's Prefecture
