= Righteous Army Command =

1919–1924 Korean independence organization

- Leaders: Lee Beom-yoon (1919); Yu In-seok (1923)
- Dates active: 1919-1924
- Country: Korea
- Allegiance: Provisional Government of the Republic of Korea; Korean Unification Government (1922-1923)
- Headquarters: Myeongwol-gu, Yanji County, Manchuria (1922); Daehwang-gu, Hwanin-hyeon, Manchuria (1923)
- Ideology: Korean independence movement Conservatism; Monarchism
- Size: 200

Korean name
- Hangul: 의군부
- Hanja: 義軍府
- RR: Uigunbu
- MR: Ŭigunbu

The Righteous Army Command (Korean: 의군부) was a monarchist independence movement group organized in Manchuria in 1919. Their military foundation was based on the former Righteous Army fighters who escaped to Manchuria after failing to retake Seoul from the Japanese Empire. They were known for fighting alongside militant independence groups at several major battles against the Japanese. When they joined the Korean Unification Government, they came into conflict with them due to ideological differences between monarchism and republicanism which led to several bloody conflicts. Eventually they withdrew from the government to establish themselves as an autonomous organization, but due to the rise in democracy and socialism their power waned and they disbanded to joined the other autonomous organizations.

== Background ==
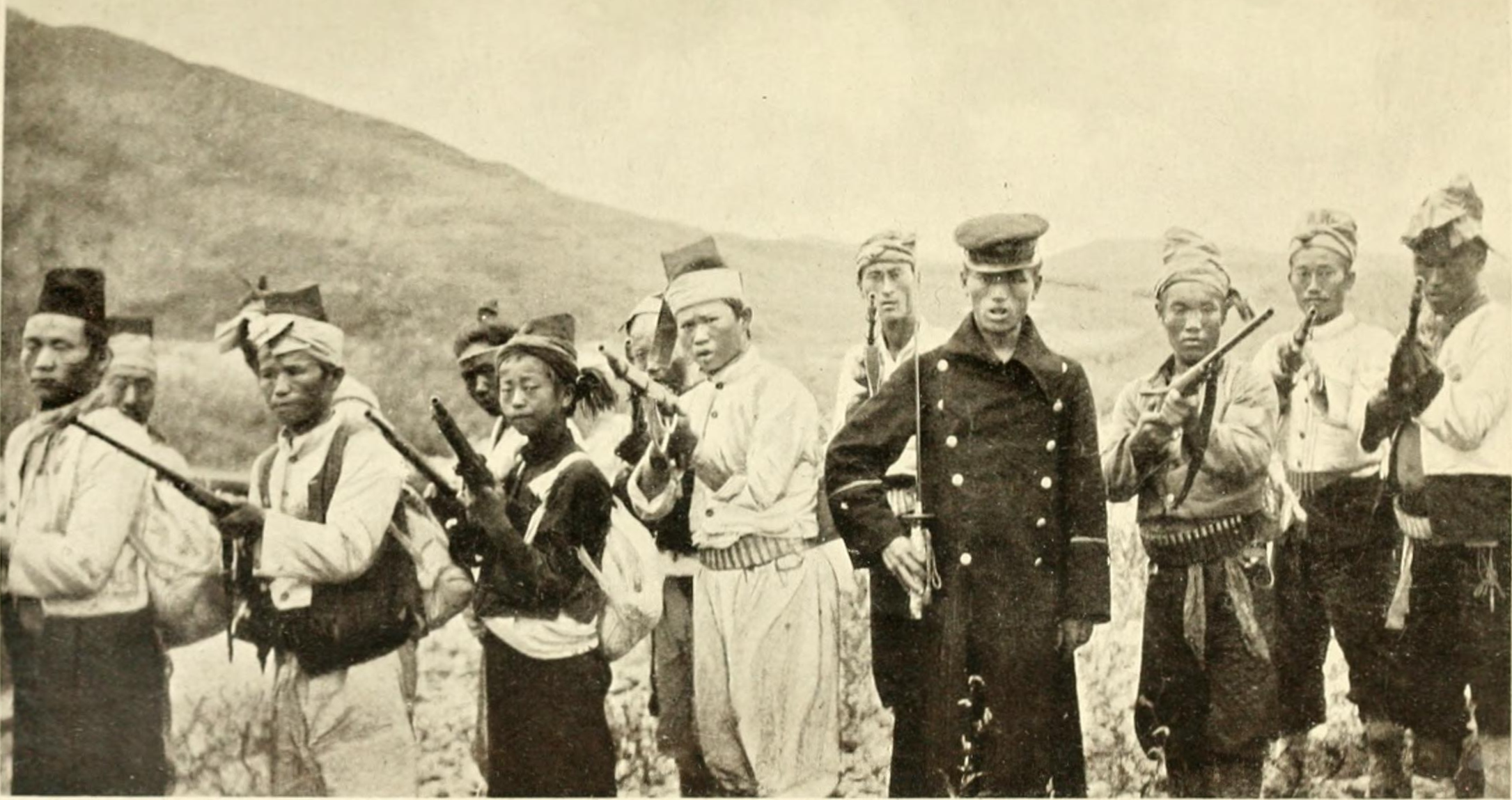
Righteous army of Jeongmi (1907)

Late Joseon dynasty period Korean nationalism outgrew the unplanned, spontaneous, and disorganized Donghak movement, and became more violent as Japanese colonizers began a brutal regime throughout the Korean peninsula and pursued repressive policies against the Korean people. For at least thirteen years after 1905, small irregular forces, often led by regular army commanders, fought skirmishes and battles throughout Korea against Japanese police, armies, and underworld mercenaries who functioned to support Japanese corporations in Korea, and as well-armed Japanese settlers who seized Korean farms and land. In one period, according to Japanese records in Boto Tobatsu-shi (Annals of the Subjugation of the Insurgent), between October 1907 and April 1908, over 1,908 attacks were made by the Korean people against the invaders.

In 1907, the Righteous Army under the command of Yi In-yeong massed 10,000 troops to liberate Seoul and defeat the Japanese. The Army came within 12 km of Seoul but could not withstand the Japanese counter-offensive. The Righteous Army was no match for two infantry divisions of 20,000 Japanese soldiers backed by warships moored near Incheon. The Righteous Army retreated from Seoul and the war went on for two more years. Over 17,000 Righteous Army soldiers were killed and more than 37,000 were wounded in combat. Unable to fight the Japanese army head-on, the Righteous Army split into small bands of partisans to carry on the War of Liberation from China, Siberia, and Mt. Baekdu in Korea. The Japanese troops first quashed the Peasant Army and then disbanded the remnants of the Imperial Korean Armed Forces. Many of the surviving guerrilla and anti-Japanese government troops fled to Manchuria and Primorsky Krai to carry on their fight. In 1910, Japan annexed Korea, starting the period of Japanese colonial rule.

Following the March 1st Movement in 1919, the March 13th Anti-Japanese Movement developed in Jiandao. Due to the influence of these anti-Japanese and Korean nationalist movements, the atmosphere of the anti-Japanese movement in the Jiandao region heightened. As a result, Anti-Japanese organizations such as the Gando National Association, Hunchun Korean Association, Northern Military Administration Office, Naja-gu Medical Department. Organizations such as Korean Democratic Corps, in the Dongbyeondo region, Korean Independence Corps, Han Chinese Association, Mutual Military Settlement were established.

== History ==
The Righteous Army, previously active in Korea, was scattered throughout northeastern Manchuria. Still, in 1919, stimulated by the March 1st Movement, Lee Beom-yun, Jin Hak-shin, Choi Woo-ik, and others formed the Righteous Army Command in Myeongwol-gu, Yanji County using the Yonghwi era name.

At a joint meeting held in March 1920 as the National Assembly in Hamatang (蛤螞塘) for the union of representatives of each group, organizations such as the National Assembly declared that they would form the Provisional Government of the Republic of Korea in Shanghai, a democratic republic. Lee Beom-yoon rejected the alliance because he supported the former monarchy, that Hong Beom-do had a fight with him. However, thanks to the persuasion of anti-Japanese independence activists such as Nam Gong-seon and Ahn Chang-ho, the union was approved at a meeting in July 1920.

The Righteous Army Command led by Lee Heo-eun, Go Pyeong and others were active in the alliance and conducted joint operations with the Korean Independence Army. They launched an effective operation in alliance with the Northern Military Administration Office to fight against Japan and crush reactionary forces. In June 1920, they defeated the border guards and military police and intimidated Korean police officers, military police assistants, and emissaries, greatly reducing pro-Japanese groups in Yongjeong Gukjaga Street in Gando and other areas along the Duman River. However, they were greatly restricted by the attacks of the Japanese military and police and the invasion of the Fengtian Clique, so they mainly focused on night time operations.

In August 1920, due to an attack by the Chinese army, instructed by the Japanese police, about 150 members of the Gamsam Corps under the command of Go Pyeong inevitably fought, resulting in heavy losses on both sides. Accordingly, the Righteous Army Command mobilized Choi Woo-ik's three companies and combined with Gopyeong's army, achieving great results, but resulting in 13 casualties, including Choi Woo-ik, Lee Eul, and Kang Do-cheon.

Afterwards, the Righteous Army Command units, which had been conducting military activities independently of each other, joined forces to strengthen the interior, participated in the Battle of Eorangchon (漁郎村戰鬪) during the Battle of Cheongsanri led by the Northern Military Administration Office, and the Korean Northern Army Command.

During the Japanese army's Gando Massacre in October 1920, numerous people were massacred in the Uiran-gu district as a result of four to five rounds of subjugation by the Japanese army. At this time, 13 people of the military branch, including general secretary Choi Woo-ik and secretary Lee Eul, Go Seong-chon committed suicide on the mountain behind. About 40 people, including Chief of Staff Park Jae-nul and Company Commander Kim Do-sam, retreated from Bongjeon-dong, Uiran-gu to Sobaekcho-gu, Wangcheong-hyeon. The main force led by Lee Heo Eun led the Gopyeong and the others military branch retreated to the Misan area, where it was incorporated into the Korean Independence Corps and withdrew to Russia.

Seo Il, Hong Beom-do, and others organized the Korean Independence Corps while avoiding the Japanese army's subjugation operation, the Righteous Army Command joined and crossed the Heilong River to Noryeong in 1921. After surviving the Free City Incident and all Korean armed units based in Siberia being forcibly disarmed by the Soviet Union, the anti-Japanese independence struggle in Primorsky Krai became difficult. Afterwards, after several military union meetings, Lee Beom-yoon was elected as chairman in 1924, and Kim Jwa-jin, Choi Jin-dong, Jo Seong-hwan, Ra Jung-so, and Kim Gyu-sik became members, and independence was achieved again. An attempt was made to organize an army, but it failed.

=== Joining the Korean Unification Government ===
When the Korean Unification Government was formed in February 1922, it was led by Chae Sang-deok, Lee Woong-hae, and Jeon Deok -won, who had a retrograde tendency, but with the formation of the Korean Unification Government in August, Kim Dong-sam gradually joined forces. People with republican beliefs such as Oh Dong-jin (吳東振), and Hyeon Jeong-gyeong (玄正卿), formed a new leadership. On the other hand, company commanders Baek Gwang-un (白狂雲, 蔡燦), Choi Seok -sun (崔碩淳), Choi Ji-poong (崔智豊), and Kim Myeong -bong (金鳴鳳), who were the actual leaders of the volunteer army, and they generally maintained a conservative stance.

==== Conflict with the Republicans ====
A disagreement between Jeon Deok-won and Yang Gi-tak (梁起鐸) surfaced. Jeon Deok-won was a former military commander under Choe Ik-hyeon and played an active role as an executive of the Korean Independence Corps, while Yang Gi-tak was a leading figure of the Patriotic Enlightenment Movement and developed a unification movement for the independence army groups in southern Manchuria after coming to Manchuria at the end of 1920. The difference in personality between the two people and the relative weakening trend of monarchism faction that emerged with the formation of Korean Unification Government soon led to their downfall. That is, on October 14, 1922, an incident occurred in which about 20 volunteer soldiers affiliated with Jeon Deok-won attacked Yang Gi-tak and his party in Gwanjeon-hyeon. In this incident, Kim Chang-ui (金昌義), director of the propaganda department of the Korean Unification Government, was killed on the spot, and executives including Yang Ki-tak, Hyeon Jeong- gyeong, Kim Gwan-seong (金寬成), Hwang Dong -ho (黃東湖), and Ko Hal-shin (高轄信) were arrested and detained. Afterwards, the conflict between the monarchist faction and the republican faction within Korean Unification Government escalated further, leading to a skirmish in late December, and large-scale bloodshed in the Hongmyoja area of Honggyeong-hyeon in January 1923. The 5th company commander Kim Myeong-bong (金鳴鳳) and the unit commander Cho Tae-hyeon (趙泰賢) were murdered on suspicion of treason against the Korean Unification Government, and an unfortunate incident occurred in which the 5th company's weapons were forcibly confiscated by another company.

=== Autonomy ===
In January 1923, Jeon Deok-won, Chae Sang-deok, Kim Pyeong- sik, Oh Seok -yeong, Park Dae-ho, and other members of the monarchist faction withdrew from the Korean Unification Government and reformed the Righteous Army Command as the Korean Righteous Army Command (Daehanuigunbu (大韓義軍府) in Daehwang-gu, Hwanin-hyeon. They declared that they would inherit Yu In-seok's loyalty and used the Yonghui era name to represent the tradition of the Righteous Army. The volunteer army united the five companies who maintained a their autonomy. In February 1923, even after the separation, the confrontation and internal division between the Korean Unification Government and the Korean Righteous Army Command continued.

== Organization ==
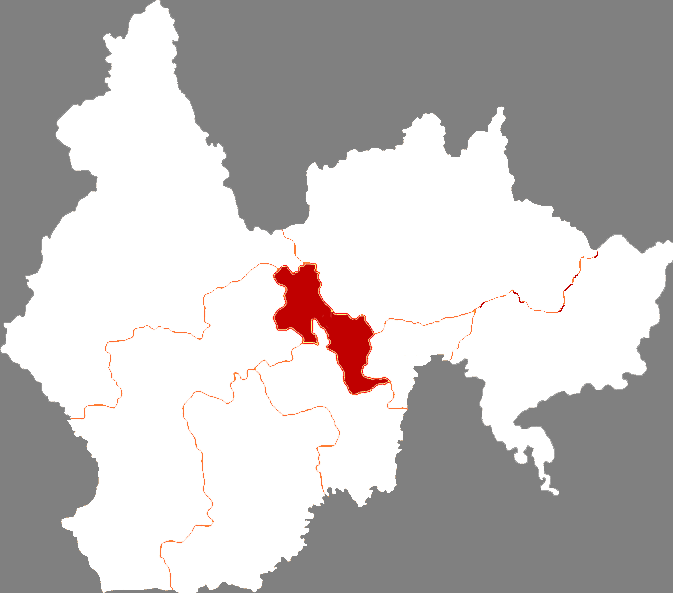
Location of the Righteous Army Command

This organization consisted of a military-administrative organization and an armed forces organization. This dual organization of the Righteous Army Command allowed the independent military units to operate individually. The organization was divided into a headquarters which was based in Myeongwol-gu, Yanji County, Manchuria, and a central division, and the area of activity was expanded to Hwaryong, Wangcheong, and Honchun where Donations from Korean residents funded it. Around February 1923, the Righteous Army Command organized by military and civilian representatives in Hwanin-hyeon, Manchuria, with the purpose of destroying domestic Japanese institutions.

=== Ideology ===
Although they were anti-Japanese, they used the Yunghui era name as they were deeply committed to the ideology of conservatism and monarchism. The monarchists, advocated for the restoration of the Joseon dynasty or the Korean Empire which puts them at ideological odds with the republicans and the socialists.

=== Executives ===
The executives of the Righteous Army Command were President Lee Beom-yoon, Commander-in-Chief Kim Hyeon-gyu, Chief of Staff Jin Jin-shin, General Affairs Director Choi Woo-ik, Military Department Director Kim Cheong-bong, Foreign Affairs Director Shin Rip, Communications Department Director Ji Ji-gang, Central Staff Chief Go Pyeong, and Secretary General. Deputy Director Lee Eul, Finance Director Kim Jong-heon, Foreign Minister Kim Jong-hwan, Communications Director Park Jae, Military Court Chief Heo Seung-wan, Military Police Commander Choi Sang-un, and Military Director Kang Mun-ju.

=== Military ===
Many were former Righteous armies. They carried out active activities such as attacking the Japanese invasion agencies through domestic campaigns with abundant practical combat experience. The armed group is headed by a battalion leader, Lee Heo Eun, Unit Commander Kang Chang-dae (姜昌大), Chief of Staff Park Jae-nul (朴載訥), Chief of Staff Go Pyeong (高平), Treasurer Kang Yeong-chan (姜永贊), Military Police Commander Choi Sang-un (崔相云), and Military Discipline Director Kang Mun-ju (姜文柱). The number of troops was about 200 people. The 180 people led by Lee Heo Eun were organized into the 1st Battalion of the Korean Northern Army Command. The military branch headquarters is based in a remote location, Buk-gu, Yeonhwa-dong, Wangwu-gu, Uiran-hyang, Yanji County, Goseongchon.

They focused on armed activities and were organized into a more straightforward organization in consideration of mobility. They also raise military funds in the Yeongdoje area. At one time, they were under the jurisdiction of the Korean Unification Government. Kim Cheong-bong (金淸鳳), Kim Hyeon-gyu (金鉉圭), and others took the lead and organized it in April of that year. It was strengthened to 6 battalions in 1 year and two months. They carried out active activities such as attacking the Japanese agencies through domestic campaigns with abundant practical combat experience. They attacked Cheongseong-jin, Uiju-gun, North Pyongan Province, raided and destroyed the police substation, customs branch office, and post office, and engaged in a fierce battle with the Japanese police.

== Dissolution ==
As republicanism emerged as a mainstream trend throughout China and socialism spread through the Russian Revolution, their influence waned. The division was gradually overwhelmed by the Korean Unification Government, and even some of the remaining forces were integrated and absorbed into the Righteous Government and the Korean People's Association in Manchuria.

== See also ==
- Korean Independence Movement
  - List of militant Korean independence activist organizations
- Korean Unification Government
- Monarchism
- Righteous armies
- Righteous Government
- Korean People's Association in Manchuria
