= Korean Righteous Military Administration Office =

1919–1921 Korean resistance group

- Leader: Lee Gyu
- Founded: October 23, 1919
- Dissolved: June 28, 1921
- Country: Korea
- Allegiance: Provisional Government of the Republic of Korea
- Headquarters: Naedosan, Ando-hyeon, Jiandao, Jilin Province
- Ideology: Korean independence movement
- Size: 900

- Korean Righteous Military Administration Office
- Hangul: 대한정의군정사
- Hanja: 大韓正義軍政司
- RR: Daehan jeongui gunjeongsa
- MR: Taehan chŏngŭi kunjŏngsa

The Korean Righteous Military Administration Office (Korean: 대한정의군정사) was an organization organized by former Korean soldiers and volunteer soldiers who had been directly fighting against the Japanese army with weapons in the country since before the March 1st Movement in 1919. They joined the Korean Independence Corps as the Korean Volunteer Army but was later disbanded due to the Free City Incident.

== Background ==
Before the annexation, Lee Gyu lost many comrades after a bloody battle with Japanese enemies in Korea as part of the Righteous armies along with Kang Hui, Lee Dong-ju, and Jo Dong-sik, who also developed the righteous army movements in the late Joseon Dynasty. In October 1910, he and his followers consisting of graduates of military service schools and volunteer soldiers during the Korean Empire, crossed the Yalu River and the Duman River, and lived as hunters in the forests of Naedosan, Ando-hyeon, Jiandao, Jilin Province. When the March 1st Movement broke out, the former Korean soldiers, volunteer soldiers, and Righteous armies who had been waiting organized the Great Korean Righteous Party and elected Lee Gyu (李圭) as its president. The location of their headquarters was about 8.54 miles from Gapsan, Hapnam, Ando-hyeon, and Musan, North Hamgyong. They dispersed to various parts of Hwa-yeo and carried out anti-Japanese struggle.

On October 23, 1919, they reported their name to the Provisional Government of the Republic of Korea in Shanghai, the organization changed their name to the Korean Righteous Military Administration Office at their recommendation, and reported its organizational structure to the Provisional Government Secretariat under the name of President Lee Gyu (李圭). The military administration, with its detailed organization, achieved success by crossing the Duman River and raiding the Japanese military police, police, and government offices on multiple occasions through practical actions.

== Organization ==
As of December 1920, the key personnel in the major departments were as follows: President Lee Gyu, Vice President Kang Hee, Commander Lee Dong-ju, Chief of the Secretariat Hong Woo-chan, Chief of the Administrative Department Kang Doo-hee, Chief of the Diplomatic Department Gil Sung-ik, Chief of the Editorial Department Yoon Seok-woo, Chief of the Inspection Department Kim Jeong-sik, Chief of the Judicial Department Yeon Byeong-jun, and Chief of the Training Department Jo Dong-sik.

=== Departments ===
Under the President and Vice President, there were appointed departments, Military Department, Finance Department, Secretariat, Finance Department, Administrative Department, Diplomatic Department, Editorial Department, and Communications Department.

Under the Military Department, there were established Inspection Department, Judicial Department, Training Department, and Equipment Department. Under the Commander, four departments were established, with Chief of Staff Lee Dong-ju, Chief of Military Affairs Kang Ik-sung, Chief of Police Kim Byung-soon, and Chief of Finance Kang Lee-jung each serving as the head of their respective departments.

Under the Finance Department, there were Treasury Department and Fundraising Department, indicating that the organization was quite detailed and of significant scale.

=== Army ===
The number of troops in this military administration office was about 900 in October 1919. 500 people were stationed under the name of the Chinese Security Corps, and 100 of them were dispersed and deployed to Naedosan Mountain. At the Sosaha Training Center, about 240 village youth members were undergoing training and placed in the Xiaoshahe region. About 100 troops were stationed in Gilsang River, Hwajeon County. In addition, hundreds of hunters were deployed in all directions, making it an independent struggle unit with considerable military power.

=== Activities ===
Based on detailed organization, military administration is carried out through practical actions. This group maintained close contact with other armed groups, such as the Korean Independence Army and the Alliance Association, that were active in the nearby area, and achieved great results by crossing the Duman River numerous times and raiding military police, police stations, and government offices under the Japanese Government-General of Korea. In addition, newspapers and magazines were published to promote education and national spirit. From 1920, the tactics of Jo Dong-sik, head of the training department, spread their power throughout Manchuria.

== Joining the Korean Independence Corps ==
In August 1920, the Japanese army retreated to Yeongan-hyeon (寧安縣) due to the Battle of Qingshanli. Ultimately, in December of that year, Seo Il, leader of the Northern Military Administration Office, Hong Beom-do, leader of the Korean Independence Army, Koo Chun-seon, leader of the Korean National Association, Kim Seong-bae, leader of the Korean People's Association, Lee Beom-yoon, leader of the Liberation Party, and the Korean Righteous Military Administration Office gathered on Mt. Mirsan to form the Korean Independence Corps. In December 1920, the office joined Kim Jwa-jin's unit and Ji Cheong-cheon's unit in Bukhagu County, Ando-hyeon, to form the Korean Volunteer Army.

=== Free City Incident ===
The Korean Independence Corps was short-lived when the factions of the Korean Communist Party vied for control over the corps. The Korean Volunteer Army sided with the Sakhalin Volunteer Corps of the Korean Communist Party against the Irkutsk Faction and the Korean Revolutionary Army causing the Soviet Red Army to intervene and order their disarmament with minimal resistance causing Korean Independence Corps to disarm and disband.

== See also ==
- Korean Independence Movement
  - List of militant Korean independence activist organizations
- Korean Independence Corps
- Free City Incident
- Korean Communist Party
- General Camp of the Liberation Army
