= General Staff Headquarters =

1924–1929 Korean independence organization

General Staff Headquarters in Manchuria of the Provisional Government of the Republic of Korea
- 대한민국 임시정부 육군주만참의부 大韓民國臨時政府陸軍駐滿參議府
- Leaders: Baek Kwang-woon (1924) X Choi Seok-sun (1924–1925) X Yoon Seong-Hwa (1925–1926); Kim Seung-hak (1926–1928); Lee Yeong-hee (acting; 1928–1929)
- Dates active: June 26, 1924 – October 19, 1929
- Country: Korea
- Allegiance: Provisional Government of the Republic of Korea
- Headquarters: Ji'an, Jilin, Manchuria
- Ideology: Korean independence movement
- Size: 600

- General Staff Headquarters in Manchuria of the Provisional Government of the Republic of Korea
- Hangul: 대한민국 임시정부 육군주만참의부
- Hanja: 大韓民國臨時政府陸軍駐滿參議府
- Revised Romanization: Daehanminguk imsijeongbu yukgunjumanchamuibu
- McCune–Reischauer: Taehanmin'guk imsijŏngbu yukkunjumanch'amŭibu

General Staff Headquarters in Manchuria
- Hangul: 육군주만참의부
- Hanja: 陸軍駐滿參議府
- Revised Romanization: Yukgunjumanchamuibu
- McCune–Reischauer: Yukkunjumanch'amŭibu

General Staff Headquarters
- Hangul: 참의부
- Hanja: 參議府
- Revised Romanization: Chamuibu
- McCune–Reischauer: Ch'amŭibu

The General Staff Headquarters, also known as the General Staff Headquarters in Manchuria of the Provisional Government of the Republic of Korea (Korean: 대한민국 임시정부 육군주만참의부), or the General Staff Headquarters in Manchuria, was a militant Korean independence organization under the direct control of the Provisional Government of the Republic of Korea, organized in 1924 in Jianhyeon, Manchuria. The General Staff Headquarters, which received formal approval from the Provisional Government on June 26, 1924, included each prefecture in Jian, Fusong, Changbai, Ando, Tonghwa, and Yuhwa. The General Staff Headquarters carried out an anti-Japanese campaign under the jurisdiction of the Korean community. They also serve as an autonomous region striving for the stability of life, economic development, and education of Koreans residing in Manchuria, the General Staff Headquarters also sought to gain independence by developing an anti-Japanese movement.

It was largely divided into central organization and local organization. The central organization was responsible for overseeing the organization. The local organization was organized under the jurisdiction of the Korean community along the Yalu River. After its establishment, it actively carried out operations to enter the country through guerrilla warfare. In addition, civil affairs activities were carried out to protect and govern the Korean community within the jurisdiction. After 1928, there was division over the direction of the independence movement, and its power weakened to the point of joining the National People's Prefecture.

== Background ==
In the spring of 1922, several independence movement groups in the southern Manchuria region, including the Korean Independence Group, Seoro Gunjeongseo, Bohapdan, Gwanghandan, and the Liberation Army General Headquarters, held a meeting for the unification of the South Manchurian people and agreed to form the Unification Military Government. Then, in August 1922, more organizations from southern Manchuria participated, and it expanded into Korean Unification Government. However, from the beginning of the establishment of the Ministry of Foreign Affairs, there was a serious conflict between republicans and capitalists. As a result, the National Assembly of Korea was established in August 1922.

In October 1922, Japan sent a large, regular army to Gando under the pretext of suppressing the independence army. And they massacred Koreans living in the Gando region on a large scale. This is called the Gando Massacre or the 'Gyeongshin disaster' because it occurred in the year of Gyeongsin. The activities of the Korean independence armies had no choice but to unite into the Korean Unification Government. It was argued that independence movement groups should be integrated to reorganize the independence armies and effectively carry out the anti-Japanese independence movement. Korean Unification Government however became divided over ideological disputes and policies, power distribution among executives, and commanding military power such as republicanism and monarchism. In the end, the conflict between those two forces led to armed conflict between the rebels.

In January 1923, the monarchists reformed the Righteous Army Command into the Korean Righteous Army Command (Daehanuigunbu (大韓義軍府)). In February 1923, the confrontation and internal division between the Korean Unification Government and the Korean Righteous Army Command even after the separation. In 1923, the 1st, 2nd, and 3rd companies of the volunteer army criticized the government for ideological conflicts. Accordingly, the leaders of independence movement groups realized the need to reintegrate the Koran Independence Armies by organizing a unit under the direct control of the Provisional Government of the Republic of Korea.

They decided to organize a military organization under the Ministry of Military Affairs of the Provisional Government of the Republic of Korea in August 1923, and five representatives, including Baek Gwang-un, Jo Neung-do, and Park Eung-baek, requested approval. Was dispatched to the Provisional Government of the Republic of Korea in Shanghai. After receiving support from the Provisional Government of the Republic of Korea, they withdrew from the Tonguibu in May 1924, issuing a statement criticizing the division and confrontation between independence movement forces and insisting on gathering under the banner of the Provisional Government of the Republic of Korea. The General Staff Headquarters was organized as a body directly under the provisional government of the Republic of Korea. The 5th Company of Volunteer Forces also joined them.

== History ==
In August 1923, Baek Gwang-un, Jo Neung-sik, Park Eung-baek, Kim Won-sang, and Jo Tae-bin were dispatched to Shanghai to negotiate with the Provisional Government. The Provisional Government accepted their proposal and recognized the Southern Manchuria Military Government (南滿軍政府) directly under the Provisional Government, which inherited the tradition of the previously established Liberation Army Command, and officially named it the General Staff Headquarters in Manchuria of the Provisional Government of the Republic of Korea. The volunteer army's 1st company commanders, Chae Chan, Kim Won-sang, and Park Eung-baek, paid attention to the Provisional Government of the Republic of Korea as a focal point to unite the conflicting independent army forces. From the end of 1923, consultations were held with members of the Provisional Government of the Republic of Korea.

In April 1924, 78 South Manchurian soldiers' representatives, consisting of representatives of the 1st, 2nd, and 3rd companies of the Tonguibu Volunteer Army, the guerrilla corps, and the independent platoon, issued a 'Declaration' containing the following contents.

1. We actively acknowledge that we are under the direct control of the Provisional Government of the Republic of Korea.
2. We will inform both inside and outside the country that we have become the vanguard of Daedong unification and actively strive to achieve unification under the banner of the Provisional Government of the Republic of Korea.
3. We invite and invite each armed group, both internal and external, to join the Republic of Korea Army.

In May 1924, a month after the announcement of the 'Declaration,' the General Staff Headquarters in Manchuria (from now on referred to as the Army Advisory Office) was established and centered on the independence forces that participated in the 'Declaration.' In June of the same year, the 5th Company of the Tonguibu Volunteer Army also withdrew from the Tonguibu and joined the General Staff Headquarters.

=== Guerilla Warfare ===
The department placed more emphasis on military organization than civil organization. Still, the jurisdiction of the Civil Affairs Department was divided into 13 local administrative districts, and its primary function was to collect military funds. In 1924, when Baek Gwang-woon, the Chairman of the Council, was assassinated, Choi Seok-soon, commander of the 2nd Company, concurrently served as the Chairman of the Army Advisory Office.

From its establishment, the General Staff Headquarters actively attempted to enter the country. After arriving at the Yalu Riverside under the guidance of correspondents, the guerrillas changed into hanbok. After crossing the Yalu River to avoid Japanese surveillance, he headed to the home of a domestic correspondent. Afterward, the mission was performed according to the situation.

The main domestic activity areas of the independent forces belonging to the Army Advisory Office were the areas bordering the Yalu River, including Wwon, Jaseong, Guseong, Ganggye, Changseong, and Huseong in North Pyongan Province. The activities of the Army Advisory Office were most active from mid-1924 to the end of 1925. A representative example of the anti-Japanese armed struggle waged by the General Staff Headquarters unit was the attack on Makoto Saito, the Governor-General of Korea, at Masitan on the banks of the Yalu River on May 19, 1924. They had received information that Makoto Saito was patrolling the border guard station along the Yalu River. Accordingly, a special force was formed with eight members of the 1st Platoon of the 2nd Company, and an ambush was set up in Masitan Valley, Wiwon County, North Pyongan Province. A salvo opened fire when Saito's security ship came within firing range. Due to the sudden attack, the border patrol boat carrying Saito fled.

It was in 1925 that the central organization of the General Staff Headquarters was significantly reorganized. On February 27, 1925, General Staff Headquarters executives, led by Choi Seok-sun, the Chairman of the General Staff Headquarters, held a military meeting at Gomaryeong (古馬嶺). This news became known to the Japanese police through spies. Japanese police raided Gomaryeong, where the meeting was being held. In March 1925, executives from five companies met at Gomaryeong (古馬嶺) in Gajaehyeon to establish an operational plan for the domestic invasion. Japan spied on this and mobilized police and military forces to launch a surprise attack. The army was able to resist this and preserve its basic capabilities, but Choi Seok-soon, 39 members, including company commander Jeon Chang-hee (田昌禧), were killed and tortured. Hong Ju and the others were arrested and suffered a great blow. At this time, 42 people, including the Chairman of the General Staff Headquarters Choi Seok-sun, died in the country. General Staff Headquarters members who suffered significant damage in Gomaryeong reorganized their organization and sought ways for a new career path.

=== Moving Towards Civil Affairs ===
As a result, in April 1925, the name was changed to Dokpanbu (督瓣府) or Jindododokbu (鎭東都督府). The basic line of the General Staff Headquarters was centered on the anti-Japanese armed struggle, as seen in the central organization. However, to make up for the damage suffered in Gomaryeong and maintain the organization, they had to focus on civil affairs activities for the Korean community. In May 1925, a special envoy was dispatched from the Provisional Government of the Republic of Korea. After discussion, it was decided to change the names of Dokpanbu and Jindongdodokbu back to Army Advisory Office. On June 26, 1925, the central organization was revised. They announced an amendment stating that there would be a Chairman of the Central Council, with four military and four civil affairs councillors under him. On August 8 of the same year, the executive team was announced with Yoon Seong-Hwa [尹聖佐, = Yun Se-yong (尹世茸)] as the Chairman of the Central Council.

In July 1926, with the Chinese National Government's Northern Expedition, a movement for a single national party developed within China, and around Ahn Chang-ho's visit to Manchuria in January 1927, three branches were unified as part of the movement for a single national party in Manchuria as well. It was promoted. However, differences of opinion and division arose over the direction and content of that integration. A three-part integrated conference was held under the auspices of the Jeongui Prefecture in September 1928. Still, the conference was discontinued in November as differences of opinion could not be resolved.

=== Decline ===
The General Staff Headquarters had a strong tradition of prioritizing military activities, so there were cases where they pressured Koreans. Some Koreans who protested against this told Chinese officials about the conditions at the General Staff Headquarters. There were cases where people expressed their sympathy or formed separate organizations and protested by refusing to pay the dues. After the mid-1920s, the Korean community in Manchuria was divided and ruled by the Jeongui Prefecture, General Staff Headquarters, and Shinmin Prefecture. However, the power of the General Staff Headquarters began to decline in late 1925. After 1926, the domestic activities of the General Staff Headquarters gradually decreased. This is because, from the late 1920s, the General Staff Headquarters, together with the Shinmin Prefecture and the Jeongui Prefecture, focused on the issue of internal solidarity while seeking a unification movement for the independent army. In June 1925, the ‘Mitsuya Agreement (三矢協約)’ was signed between the Japanese Government-General of Korea and the warlord of the Fengtian clique. As a result, the oppression of independent forces operating in Manchuria intensified.

Beginning around 1928, divisions arose within the organization over the direction of the independence movement. In 1929, some members of the General Staff Headquarters moved to the National People's Government, and those led by Kim Seung-hak created the Innovation Council. The power of General Staff Headquarters was greatly weakened. In this process, an organizational split occurred within the General Staff Headquarters, and the majority faction of the General Staff Headquarters declared the dissolution of the General Staff Headquarters and formed the Innovation Council (革新議會) in December 1928 by joining forces with the secessionist faction of the Jeongui Prefecture and the military government faction of the Shinmin Prefecture. The remaining faction of the General Staff Headquarters, which did not participate in the Innovation Council, linked up with the majority faction of the Jeonguibu and the civilian government faction of the Shinmin Prefecture, led by Sim Yong-jun, and joined the National People's Prefecture in April 1929.

== Activities ==
The General Staff Headquarters anti-Japanese battle was more active than other groups, leaving behind its best performance in 1924. It was an organization that placed more emphasis on armed activities than on the autonomy and stability of Koreans. More than two-thirds of the activities of the independence army in Korea during this period were carried out by the General Staff Headquarters. He achieved remarkable results in various fields, including raiding the Japanese military and police, destroying Japanese colonial institutions, purging pro-Japanese activists, and raising military funds. On May 19, before the formal approval of the Provisional Government, Governor Saito boarded a patrol boat under the pretext of inspecting the security of the border region, ambushed him as he descended the Yalu River, and drove him into chaos, one of the most notable activities of the Army Advisory Office.

=== Military Activities ===
The main activity of the General Staff Headquarters was the anti-Japanese armed struggle. Each company was concentrated on the banks of the Yalu River, where entry into the country was easy. Chosan (楚山), Wiwon (渭原), Manpojin (滿浦鎭), and Gajeonhyeon in North Pyongan Province were the main military bases and stages of General Staff Headquarters's activities. In the early days of the establishment of the Army Advisory Office, three of the five companies were deployed to Gajae-hyeon, and the remaining units were located in Hwanin-hyeon and Tonghwa-hyeon. In particular, they went into the country to raise military funds, punish pro-Japanese factions, and carried out activities to attack Japan's ruling institutions. In 1925, they attacked police stations near Chosan Mountain along the Yalu River and fought with Japanese border guards. Correspondents were dispatched to Korean villages between dispersed regions and stayed there for a certain period. The purpose was to understand the surrounding situation, report instructions from headquarters, sympathies of the Japanese military, etc., and communicate with them. When a company or platoon entered their village, the correspondents guided them to where the next correspondent was. The guidance of correspondents was the main way for the guerrillas to reach their destination.

=== Civil Affairs Activities ===
The General Staff Headquarters also conducted civil affairs activities to protect and govern the Korean community within its jurisdiction. First, they focused their attention on educating second-generation Koreans by establishing schools. Because the area under the jurisdiction of the Army Advisory Office was mainly mountainous, it was realistically impossible to build large-scale facilities. Therefore, small educational facilities were established throughout Korean villages to provide elementary education. In addition, negotiations with the Chinese authorities reached an agreement to create a Korean department in Chinese middle schools. In addition, Dongheung Hospital was established in the forest in Jijahyeon County, Dongwha Hospital and Hwajeon Hospital were established in Hwajeon County, and Tongdong Hospital was established in Daecheonan, Tonghwa County. As of January 1926, the General Staff Headquarters operated four hospitals and three schools. Attention was also paid to the employment activities of Koreans. He established a rice mill and, based on profits, carried out activities to support Koreans' farming funds. While armed activities slowed down following the Battle of Gomaryeong, the General Staff Headquarters worked for the stability of Korean society. In 1927, when Kim Seung-hak became the Chairman of the Central Council, the 13 local administrative committees were reduced to 7 administrative districts. Three administrative members were assigned to each district.

== Organization ==
Ji'an (red) in Tonghua (white)

The General Staff Headquarters' organization can be broadly divided into central organization and local organization. The leading organization was responsible for overseeing the organization. The local organization was organized under the jurisdiction of the Korean community along the Yalu River. The central organization of the General Staff Headquarters changed from an organization focused on armed struggle to a system centered on autonomy. This was due to changes in internal and external factors. Looking at the early organization and central personnel of Army Advisory Office, the following is provided.

At the time of its founding, the Chairman of the Council was the 1st Company Commander was Baek Gwang-woon, the 2nd Company Commander was Choi Seok-sun, the 3rd Company Commander was Choi Ji-poong, the 4th Company Commander was Kim Chang-bin, and the 5th Company Commander was Kim Chang-cheon. Baek Si-gwan (白時觀) was the Chairman of the central meeting, and Kim So-ha (金筱廈) was the head of the civil affairs department. There was an Independent platoon leader, Heo Woon-gi; training leader, Park Eung-baek; Central Council Chairman, Baek Si-gwan; and Civil Affairs Department Chief, Kim So-ha.

In 1925, 29 executives were killed in an ambush by the Japanese military and police during an executive meeting in Gomaryeong. Due to this ‘Gomaryeong Massacre,’ the Army Advisory Office organization and activities shrank. In particular, when the Mitsuya Agreement was signed, and Japan and China checked and blocked the activities of the independent army, they reorganized their organization and strengthened their power. In this reorganization, Yun Se-yong (尹世茸) was appointed as the Chairman of the Central Council, and the organization was diversified into police affairs, transportation, judiciary, academic affairs, military law, finance, foreign affairs, and military affairs, with a chief in each department. The independence army also appointed Park Eung-baek as commander and commanded five companies.

In 1927, when Yoon Se-Yong, Chairman of the Central Council, resigned, Kim Seung-hak was appointed, and the organization reorganized. Chairman of the Central Council Kim Seung-hak; Military Committee Chairman Mac Chang-deok; Civil Affairs Committee Chairman Kim So-ha; Finance Committee Chairman Han Eui-je; Legal Affairs Committee Chairman Gye-dam; Education Committee Chairman Yang Ki-ha; Central Council Chairman Baek Si-gwan, 1st Administrative District Chairman Kim Young-jeon, 2nd Administrative District Chairman Park Jong-su, 3rd Administrative District Chairman Yang Ki-ha, 4th Administrative District Chairman Bae Hak-seo, 5th Administrative District Chairman Kim Seon-pung, 6th Administrative District Chairman. Chairman Lee Sik-il, 7th Administrative District Chairman Choi Ji-poong, 1st Company Commander Kim So-ha, 2nd Company Commander Park Hee-gon, 3rd Company Commander Yang Bong-je, 4th Company Commander Choi Cheon-ju, 5th Company Commander They were Park Dae-ho (Park Dae-ho) and Central Guard Commander Cha Cheon-ri (車千里). After March 1927, Kim Seung-hak (金升學) took charge of the Cham Speaker.

=== Army ===
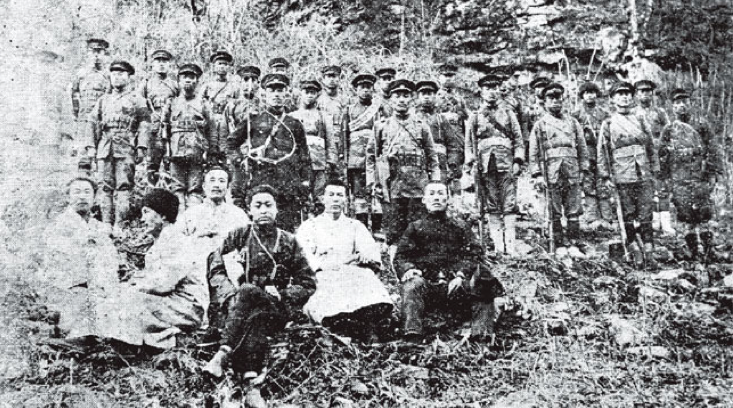
Members of the Provisional Government of the Republic of Korea Army's General Staff Headquarters

The military organization of the General Staff Headquarters was organized into five companies and one independent platoon. At the beginning of its establishment, the military strength was more than 500 men, maintaining more than 600 men until July 1928. Each Company comprised about 140 troops, and its platoons were distributed and deployed to various surrounding areas. A mandatory military service system was implemented within the jurisdiction to supplement troops, and the Veterans Corps provided military training to rural youth. The General Staff Headquarters mainly carried out domestic advance operations. It attacked police substations and township offices in the Pyeongan Province region. Under the central organization of the General Staff Headquarters, each Company was deployed as a military organization. Each General Staff Headquarters company was mainly stationed near the Yalu River, which was advantageous for entering the country. Only the units of the 5th Company were located in Tonghwa County, away from the Yalu River.

Under the head of the Baek family, a special organization called the Communication Company was formed. The main tasks of the Communications company were twofold. First, it was communications work. It was responsible for communication between each Company and its affiliated units and as guidance for independent forces entering the country. Next was to collect duties from Koreans in the jurisdiction for the activities of the independence army.

In March 1925, the entire unit was divided into three units and moved toward Chosan, North Pyongan Province, attacking and destroying the Chu-dong police station, the Hadan-dong police station, and the Yeohae police station in Byeokdong-gun, then retreating and engaging with the border guards, showing their bravery.

=== Civil Affairs ===
The central organization of the General Staff Headquarters was characterized by being organized around units. The Civil Affairs Department was the only department in charge of administrative matters. The Civil Affairs Department was responsible for overseeing local organizations. In October 1924, an incident occurred in which Chae Chan (= Baek Gwang-un), the Chairman of the Cham Council and the commander of the 1st Company, died after being attacked by Tonguibu members. At this time, the organization was reorganized. The jurisdiction of Chamuibu is centered around Jianhyeon (輯安縣), including Gwanjeon (寬甸), Hwanin (桓仁), Tonghwa (通化), Fusong (撫松), Jangbaek (長白), Ando (安圖), and Yuhwa (柳). In this area, there were more than 15,000 residents.

The General Staff Headquarters had a central organization and local organizations to protect and manage Koreans. In the early days of its establishment, the General Staff Headquarters divided jurisdictions and established 13 local administrative committees. Afterward, each administrative committee measured the population and appointed a hundred heads of households for every thousand households. Beneath the hundred heads were the ten heads of the household. An administrative district was established where many Koreans lived, and about 50 security guards were deployed. They were responsible for maintaining public order and protecting the property of Koreans.

From August 1925, the committee system was adopted, departments were established, the affairs of the departments were divided to take charge of autonomous administration, and more than 50 protection officers were trained to take charge of public security in each region. Residents paid a mandatory fee of 10 won every year. With the funds raised this way, the government was equipped with weapons and implemented an administration for industrial promotion and education.

== Joining the National People's Government ==
In 1928, an incident occurred in which Han Eui-je, Chairman of the Finance Committee, organized a pro-Japanese group and betrayed the General Staff Headquarters. Due to these circumstances, the General Staff Headquarters focused on anti-Japanese armed struggle and eradicating pro-Japanese elements in Manchuria instead of entering the country through guerrilla warfare. When the Innovation Council, which gave birth to the three-part integration movement, was formed in 1928, Chairman Kim Seung-hak participated in it and declared its disbandment. When the National People's Government (國民府) was formed in 1929, most of the members left to other organizations. Afterward, Kim Seung-hak led the General Staff Headquarters, but when the Japanese police caught him on October 19, the General Staff Headquarters was disbanded. Meanwhile, Lee Yeong-hee (李永熙), Acting Chairman of the Central Council, worked with 15 of his subordinates in the Gajeonhyeon area and promoted the revival of the Army Advisory Office, but it was not realized.

== See also ==
- Korean Independence Movement
  - List of militant Korean independence activist organizations
- Korean People's Association in Manchuria
- National People's Government
