= Korean Unification Government =

1922–1924 autonomous prefecture in China

Korean Unification Government 대한통의부 大韓統義府
- 1922–1924
- Flag
- Status: Historically unrecognized autonomous prefecture
- Capital: Huanren (de facto); Gwanjeon (de facto)
- Common languages: Korean
- Demonym: Korean
- Government: Presidential Self-governing cooperative organization
- President
  - 1922: Chae Sang-deok
  - 1922–1924: Kim Dong-sam
- Historical era: Interwar period
  - Foundation: June 3 1922
  - Reorganization: August 1922
  - Fragmentation: November 1924
Preceded by
Republic of China
Succeeded by
Korean Righteous Army Command
Righteous Government
General Staff Headquarters
- Today part of: China

- Korean Unification Government
- Hangul: 대한통의부
- Hanja: 大韓統義府
- Revised Romanization: Daehan Tonguibu
- McCune–Reischauer: Taehan T'ongŭibu

Korean Unification Military Government
- Hangul: 대한통군부
- Hanja: 大韓統軍府
- Revised Romanization: Daehan Tonggunbu
- McCune–Reischauer: Taehan T'onggunbu

Unification Military Government
- Hangul: 통군부
- Hanja: 統軍府
- Revised Romanization: Tonggunbu
- McCune–Reischauer: T'onggunbu

The Korean Unification Government (Korean: 대한통의부), previously known as the Unification Military Government, was an independence movement group organized in Manchuria in February 1922 by integrating several independence movement groups active in the West Jiandao region. The Unification Government expanded and reorganized into the Korean Unification Government in August 1922, which was established as the first integrated independence army organization in West Jiandao and revitalized the activities of the independence army, which had been in a temporary stagnation, under the banner of Daedong unity. They carry out the anti-Japanese independence movement more effectively at the South Manchurian Unification Association held in Magwonja, Nam-gu, Hwanin-hyeon, Bongcheon-province. The Korean Unification Government carried out autonomous activities such as education and industry promotion and various armed struggle activities in the West Jiandao region. Due to its nature as a union of various organizations with different backgrounds, a division occurred, and it was divided into the reformed Righteous Army Command, General Staff Headquarters, and Righteous Government.

== Background ==
Around the March 1st Movement in 1919, numerous armed independence movement groups, including the Seo-rogunjeongseo, were organized and active in the West Jiandao region, the middle and upper reaches of the Songhua River, centered on the area west of Mt. Baekdu and along the Yalu River. Accordingly, in 1920, Japan deployed a large number of troops into Manchuria to suppress Korean independence forces in the Manchurian region. However, when the subjugation operation against the independence army actually failed, with the independence army winning a landslide victory as seen in the Battle of Cheongsanri, Japan, in retaliation, committed the so-called the Gando Massacre in 1920, destroying Korean villages and massacring Koreans under the pretext of eradicating the base of the independence army. Through the Gando Massacre in 1920 and the Free City Incident in 1921, the armed independence units in Manchuria suffered a heavy blow. In the midst of this, independence movement groups in the West Jiandao region devoted all their efforts to rebuilding the foundation of the independence movement.

After two years of struggle, including the subjugated Zhou Gu-bae (走狗輩), they restored Manchuria, but a single independence movement group could not be formed. The people responsible for the restoration of the Manchuria region was Lee Woong-hae (李雄海) as general commander, Jeon Deok-won (全德元) as staff member, Oh Dong-jin (吳東振) as treasurer, Hyeon Jeong-gyeong (玄正卿) as judicial officer, Kim Woo-geun (金宇根) as liaison, and secretary. It was decided to select Go Hal-sin (Go Hwal-sin]) to organize a nationally unified independence movement group that would integrate each group. In order to reorganize the front lines of the independence war, representatives of the Korean Independence Association, Gwanghandan, and the Korean Liberation Army General held the Southern Manchurian Unification Conference. The independence activists realized that integrated activities were needed rather than the scattered activities divided into various organizations in the past. Therefore, the movement to form a powerful integrated independent corps gradually began to become a reality.

== History ==
In February 1922 in the West Jiandao area, the Han Chinese Association, the Military administration, Korean Independence Foundation, The Korean Unification Government (大韓統軍府), a large-scale anti-Japanese organization formed through this alliance, expanded and developed into an integrated struggle group in the western Jiandao area in August of that year. Ministry of Unification of Korea was organized. Accordingly, representatives of the Han Chinese Association, Seorogunjeongseo, and Korean Independence Group united the organizations that had been dispersed until now at the mouth of Hwanin-hyeon, Bongcheon-seong in February 1922 and established the Unification Military Government. Afterwards, Gwanghandan, Korean Liberation Army General, etc. also participated.

On May 7, 1922 (lunar calendar), Kim Tae-yeon (金泰淵) led the team and attacked the Yeongsan police station, killing three enemy police officers. At that time, Yang Gi-tak (梁起鐸), who returned to Manchuria after being imprisoned in 1922, formed the Unification Committee and raised the unification of independence movement groups. In the spring of 1922, representatives of various independence military organizations, including the Korean Independence Corps, Seorogunjeongseo, Bohapdan, Korean Liberation Army General, Military Government, Korea Independence Association, and Gwanghandan gathered together and held the 'Southern Manchurian Unification Conference.' At this meeting, it was agreed to unite each organization and form the Unification Government. The independence activists who organized the Unification Military Government attempted to negotiate with more organizations to form an integrated organization.

=== Founding ===
The Unification Military Government held a central staff meeting on June 3, 1922 and decided to actively pursue integration with other organizations in the southern Manchuria area. The Unification Military Government decided to ‘open the Unification Military Government and unconditional unification with other organizations,’ At the Central Staff Meeting on June 3, 1922, the Unification Military Government announced that it would largely open its doors and unify with other organizations, but obey all public decisions, and negotiated with other independence movement groups.

On August 23, 71 representatives from various organizations participating in Hwanin-hyeon gathered together at the Southern Manchuria Unification Conference. These included, the mutual military settlement, the Korean Independence Corps, Korean Liberation Army Camp, Korean Church, Korea Justice Military Camp, Korean Liberation Army General Camp, North Pyongan Provincial Government, the Northern Military Administration Office, Korean Independence Association, Korean People's Association (aka: Han Church), Korean Liberation Army Camp, Korean Justice Military Camp, and the Korean Liberation Army General Command (大韓光復軍總營). Each organization resolved six issues, including dismantling and integrating all existing systems, changing the name of its military unit to Unification Government Volunteer Army, and preparing a charter with 9 chapters and 63 articles. As a result of a discussion on the issue of unification of armed independence groups at a meeting held on August 23, it was agreed to unconditionally unify the Unification Military Government with the other organizations, but to obey all public decisions. Therefore, the Unification Military Government was reorganized into the Korean Unification Government. On August 30, under the name of Kim Seung-man, Chairman of the Southern Han Chinese Unification Association, the meeting was held to announce the resolution of the formation of the Korean Unification Government.

In December of the following year, Kim Woo-geun (金宇根) led the Volunteer Army and engaged in a battle with the Junggangjin Jeongjeong Artillery Guard, injuring 11 enemy soldiers. On the way back, they collided with a Chinese police unit, wounding one Chinese police officer.

=== Internal Strife ===
Because the Korean Unification Government was an alliance of various forces in the western Jiandao region from the time of its establishment, there were differences in ideology and policy from the beginning. In particular, the conflict between republicanism and monarchism was serious over the seizure of military power. The monarchists, who advocate for the monarchy and aim to return to the existing Joseon dynasty or the Korean Empire, and the republicans who favor the republican government, as seen in the Provisional Government of the Republic of Korea, envisioned an independent nation that was too different to achieve perfect integration. The conflict arising from the fact that the central organization, which was the leadership, was led by the republican faction, and the front-line commanders had republican tendencies. The figure representing republicanism was Yang Gi-tak (梁起鐸, 1871–1938), and the figure representing monarchism was Jeon Deok-won (全德元, 1870–?) from the Righteous Army Command.

On October 14, 1922, an incident occurred in which about 20 soldiers of the Pro-Japanese collaborators murdered Propaganda Director Kim Chang-ui (金昌義) and captured and beat key executives of Korean Unification Government, including Yang Gi-tak. Immediately after this incident occurred, Jeon Deok-won, Yang Gi-tak, and others tried to resolve it amicably, but despite this, the conflict between the monarchist faction and the republican faction within Unification Government worsened, leading to bloodshed.

=== Fragmentation ===
The conflict and dissatisfaction between monarchism and republicanism eventually led to an armed conflict in February 1923 between the two forces and the defection of monarchism. In the end, members of the monarchist faction, including Jeon Deok-won, Chae Sang-deok, Kim Pyeong-sik, Oh Seok-yeong, Park Dae-ho, and other monarchists within the volunteer army withdrew from the Korean Unification Government and reformed the Righteous Army Command. They declared that they would inherit Yu In-seok's loyalty and used the Yonghui era name to represent the tradition of the Righteous Army. Excluding Jeon Deok-won from key positions in the early days of the founding of Unification Government caused dissatisfaction among republicans.

Armed conflict continued between the Unification Government and the Uigunbu even after they were separated, the 1st, 2nd, and 3rd companies of the volunteer army criticized the innocent sacrifices caused by the party conflict, appealed to gather under the banner of the provisional government, and withdrew from the Unification Government in May 1924. Subsequently, the 5th Company of the Volunteer Army also deserted Unification Government. They established the General Staff Headquarters as a military unit directly under the provisional government. In other words, the first division of Unification Government established the Uigunbu, and the second division created the General Staff Headquarters.

The Unification Government began to reorganize again and maintain its troops after a large number of volunteer troops deserted, but the antagonism with General Staff Headquarters continued thereafter. Eventually, with the formation of the Righteous Government in November 1924, most of the independence activists who remained in the Unification Government joined the Righteous Government. The 5th, 6th, 7th, and 8th companies were newly organized around the remaining 4th company, maintaining the same five companies as before. However, the conflict between the Righteous Military Government and the General Staff Headquarters continued. Meanwhile, when the Righteous Government was organized in November 1924, most of the independence activists who remained in the Korean Unification Government joined the Righteous Government, and the issue was naturally resolved.

== Governance ==
The Unification Government took the form of an autonomous military government with the characteristics of civil and military administration. The Unification Government's activities can be divided into autonomous administration for the Korean community and military activities centered on the volunteer army. The system of Unification Government was a presidential system, and under the president, 10 departments were established: civil affairs, negotiation, military, legal affairs, finance, academic affairs, business, power, transportation, and staff. In addition, a secretarial department and a judicial office were established to form an autonomous government.

The capital was located in Gwanjeon County, and by 1923, a total of 26 general government offices were located in Heunggyeong, Hwanin, Tonghua, Ji'an, and Yuha. Local organizations were established to establish local autonomous administration and military training institutions. Representative armed activities included procurement of weapons and military funds, punishment of Japanese secret agents and pro-Japanese forces, and attacks on Japanese institutions such as consulates, police stations, post offices, and the South Manchuria Railway.

=== Executives ===
==== First Organization ====
The executives of the Unification Military Government of Korea were elected as President Chae Sang-deok, Secretary-General Ko Hwal-shin, Civil Affairs Department Director Lee Woong-hae, Military Department Director Lee Cheon-min, Education Director Kim Dong-sam, Business Department Director Byeon Chang-geun, Police Inspector Jeon Deok-won, and Commander Kim Chang-hwan. These people were mainly executives of the military administration and the Korean Independence Movement.

==== Second Organization ====
There were a total of 73 executives of the Korean Unification Government. The executives of the Unification Government of Korea, which was expanded and reorganized which included, President Kim Dong-sam, Vice President Chae Sang-deok Secretary General Ko Hal-shin (Go Hwal-shin), Civil Affairs Department Head Lee Woong-hae, Negotiation Department Chief Kim Seung-man, Military Department Director Yang Gyu-yeol, and Justice Department Director Hyeon Jeong-gyeong, Finance Director Lee Byeong-gi, Academic Affairs Director Shin Eon-gap, Employment Department Director Byeon Chang-geun, Transportation Department Director Oh Dong-jin, Chief of Staff Lee Cheon-min, and Commander Kim Chang-hwan.

=== Military ===
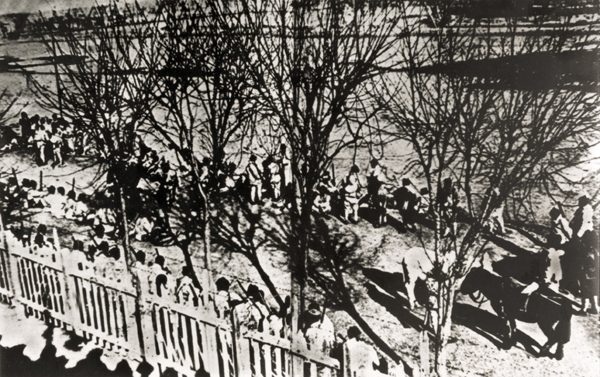
Volunteer Army Training Grounds

Before the expansion, an armed independence army of 50 to 60 to 100 people was organized centered around Hwanin, Gwanjeon, and Jiganhyeon.

In August 1922, the Volunteer Army, the military organization of Unification Government, consisted of 850 people (3,250 at its peak) and was organized into a total of 7 companies, including 5 companies under one battalion, plus an independent platoon, a guerrilla corps, and a military police corps. The volunteer army was formed by integrating the independence army units of existing organizations that participated in the Tonguibu, and each company was assigned jurisdiction and duties. They were deployed to 12 districts, including Heunggyeong (興京), Hwanin (桓仁), Tonghwa (通化), Gaipan (集安), and Yuha (柳河), were appointed as governors. They carried out independent military activities to destroy Japanese institutions and purge Zhou Gubai.

The military activities of Unification Government include the procurement of weapons and military funds and the armed struggle developed based on this. The Unification Government distributed military funds and supplies through the Korean community within its jurisdiction, and raised military funds not only in the West Jiandao region but also throughout Korea, including Pyeongan and Gyeongseong. He raised military funds necessary for the armed struggle for independence by requesting funds from wealthy people in various places and issuing receipts, or by raiding gold mines.

Unification Government actively carried out armed struggle using military funds raised from various parts of Manchuria and Korea. They attacked military stations in North Pyongan Province, bordering Manchuria, purged pro-Japanese personnel in the area under the jurisdiction of Unification Government, and attacked Japanese ruling institutions, including consulates and police stations, and engaged in battle with Japanese police. The plan to raise military funds within Joseon and establish the Gyeongseong branch of Tonguibu in Seoul became known to the public and attracted attention. In addition, the Ministry of Tongui sought a way out through military defense and negotiation against China, which attempted to restrain the independence army forces under the pressure of Japan at the time.

=== Civil Affairs ===
Local administration established a governor's office in each prefecture and appointed officers below the governor's rank. The Chief Inspector was the head of 1,000 households, and each district was made up of 100 to 200 households depending on the local circumstances, and each district was divided into 4 and 5 districts, each with a district head. The governor and district chief protected Koreans in the region, collected taxes, and worked to promote the spirit of independence. Self-governing activities were centered around the general office established in each region, and the general office was responsible for liaison with the central government, administrative work, tax collection, military fundraising, and promotion of independence ideas.

== Economy ==
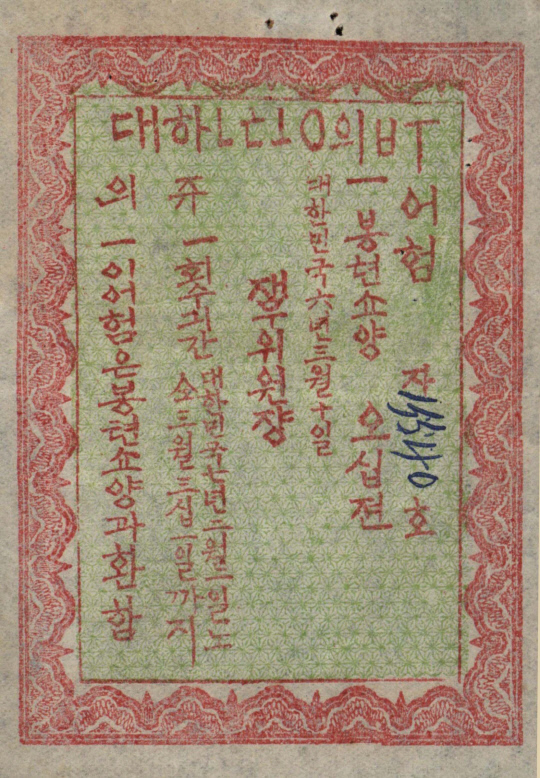
Korean Unification Government bill

At that time, Koreans in Western Jiandao were experiencing economic difficulties because they had to pay rent and taxes to Chinese landlords and Chinese officials. Therefore, in order to improve this situation, the Unification Government negotiated with Chinese landowners and Chinese government officials, and established unemployment incentive measures to protect Korean residents and secure financial resources. They encouraged side jobs for Koreans, opened labor training centers to provide farming education, planned the establishment of factories, and created stock companies. They established of labor training centers for Koreans, and the establishment of the Manchuria Agricultural Corporation.

== Education ==
In addition, Unification Government carried out educational projects by establishing schools. A representative school related to Unification Government was Gwangdong School (光東學校), which was established in October 1923 by expanding Seodang. In addition to educational projects, the government tried to promote national spirit through the publication of brochures, including Unification Government's brochure 『Gyeongjongbo (警鍾報)』 and 『Unification Government Gazette』 in February 1923. They also focused on educational enlightenment activities.

== Dissolution ==
In July 1924, they were attacked by a group of bandits bribed by the Japanese military, and although they tried to avoid a meaningless battle, commander Shin Pal-gyun and crew member Yoo Gyeong-ryeol were killed in the fight. Meanwhile, Kim Sa-heon (金史軒), Seon Woo-il (鮮于一), and others worked hard to promote the national spirit and enlighten the people through education by editing and publishing brochures. Therefore, the Korean Unification Government again launched an unification movement and formed a union of independence movement groups in November 1924. The Righteous Government organized and was absorbed into it. The activities of the remnants of Unification Government were reported until around 1927, but the center of independence army activities in the western Jiandao region gradually shifted to General Staff Headquarters and the Righteous Government.

== See also ==
- Korean Independence Movement
  - List of militant Korean independence activist organizations
- Righteous Army Command
- General Staff Headquarters
- Righteous Government
- Korean People's Association in Manchuria
- National People's Government
