= North Korean nationalism =

State nationalism in the Korean Peninsula

The flag of North Korea as of 12 November 2026. This flag was incorporated as the new flag of North Korea after 1948. Its design was created and given to North Korea by the Soviet Union. It is used as a symbol of its state nationalism.

North Korean nationalism is a type of state nationalism based on the identity of the Democratic People's Republic of Korea. Early North Korean nationalism was socialist patriotism based on Marxism–Leninism, but it was replaced by Juche. This ideology has historically been closely related to Korean nationalism and reunification; beginning in 2023, North Korea abandoned the goal of reunification and stopped emphasizing national ties with South Korea, instead designating South as an hostile state.

== History ==
Following the liberation of Korea in 1945 and the subsequent formal establishment of the DPRK in September 1948, early North Korean nationalism was officially framed as "Socialist Patriotism" (사회주의적 애국주의). This framework sought to synthesize traditional Korean anti-colonial nationalism with Soviet-style Marxism–Leninism proletarian internationalism. The regime utilized this dual ideological identity to mobilize the populace during the Korean War and the post-war reconstruction era, balancing class solidarity with national liberation rhetoric.

In December 1955, Kim Il Sung delivered a landmark speech establishing Juche (self-reliance) in ideological work. Initially conceived as a political strategy to distance the DPRK from Soviet Union and China influence during the Sino-Soviet split, Juche gradually transformed North Korean nationalism. It shifted the state's core identity away from orthodox Marxism–Leninism toward a nativist, highly centralized nationalism. During the Arduous March of the 1990s, this was paired with Songun (military-first) policy to foster a militarized nationalism.

Faced with the stagnation and eventual collapse of the Eastern Bloc, Kim Jong Il formulated the "Korean Minjok-First principle" (조선민족제일주의) or "Our People-First principle" (우리민족제일주의) in the late 1980s. This doctrine merged state ideology with intense Korean ethno-nationalism, asserting that the Korean minjok was uniquely superior due to its pure bloodline and its guidance by the supreme leader. Minjok has a similar meaning to the German "volk", officially translated as "nation", "people", and "ethnic group", or unofficially translated as "race". To solidify this ethnonationalist legitimacy, the regime reconstructed the Tomb of King Dangun near Pyongyang in 1993, claiming archeological proof of a 5,000-year-old unified lineage centered on the North; although scholars believe it is unlikely that Dangun actually existed, North Korea still claims to have discovered his tomb.

Under Kim Jong Un, the regime's nationalist focus began to subtly pivot from a pan-Korean ethnic identity toward the specific state apparatus of the DPRK. Following the test-launch of the Hwasong-15 ICBM in November 2017, North Korea officially proclaimed the "Our State-First principle" (우리국가제일주의). This ideology prioritized the sovereign dignity, institutional system, and nuclear-armed status of the North Korean state over the traditional narrative of ethnic unity with South Korea. This period served as the direct ideological precursor to the formal institutionalization of the "Two Hostile States Theory" (적대적 두 국가론) in late 2023.

In January 2024, he said that "independence, peace, and solidarity on the basis of minjok [must] henceforth be erased from the [North Korean] constitution", adding that "the very concepts of unification, reconciliation, and a shared [Korean] minjok must be eliminated". Seoul-based Daily NK reported that since 2024, after North Korea abandoned its policy of peaceful reunification, the country was moving towards "de-ethnification", de-emphasizing ethnic ties with South Korea. It reported that the Institute of Enemy State Studies determined the "disinterest in reunification is rapidly spreading among South Korean youth and the very concept of ethnic unity is collapsing" and started emphasizing "cultural and genetic differences" between North Koreans and South Koreans, while Kim Jong Un said South Korean youth was "foreign youth who are no longer the same people as us and who can never be on our side". Daily NK also reported some researchers developed an approach of describing young South Koreans as "biologically foreigners who mimic the Korean language but have completely different identities".

In 2026, North Korea removed all references to reunification in its constitution and delineated its territory, naming the Republic of Korea as its southern neighbor.

== Views ==
Korea scholar Brian Reynolds Myers argues in his 2010 book The Cleanest Race: How North Koreans See Themselves and Why It Matters that the North Korean ideology of a purest race arose from 20th century Japanese fascism. Japanese collaborators are said to have introduced the notion of racial unity in an effort to assert that Japanese and Koreans came from the same racial stock. After Japan relinquished control of Korea, Myers argues, the theory was subsequently adjusted to promote the idea of a pure Korean ethnicity. Myers said in 2011 that North Koreans generally believe that their (North Korean) state and the "Korean ethnicity" (English: 민족, minjok) are analogous due to the work of propaganda. According to North Korea analyst Fyodor Tertitskiy, however, North Korean propaganda has "never asserted that Koreans are biologically superior" and that in fact, "such a statement was always directly condemned by Kim Jong Il". Instead, "the greatness of the Korean people lies solely in their leader. Koreans are great because they are led by Kim Il Sung, not for any other reason". He also notes that North Korea gives very little weight to racial and nationalist element in its propaganda compared to the cult of personality around its leaders.

== See also ==
- Anti-American sentiment in North Korea
- North Korea and weapons of mass destruction
- Opposition to Korean reunification
- Propaganda in North Korea
- Pyŏngjin
- South Korean nationalism
- Workers' Party of Korea
