= Korean nationalism =

Korean name
- Hangul: 한국 내셔널리즘
- Hanja: 韓國 내셔널리즘
Transcriptions
- Revised Romanization: Hanguk naesyeonalrijeum
- McCune–Reischauer: Han’guk naesyŏnŏllijŭm

Alternative Korean name
- Hangul: 한민족주의
- Hanja: 韓民族主義
Transcriptions
- Revised Romanization: Han minjokjuui
- McCune–Reischauer: Han minjokchuŭi

Alternative Korean name
- Hangul: 조선민족주의
- Hanja: 朝鮮民族主義
Transcriptions
- Revised Romanization: Joseon minjokjuui
- McCune–Reischauer: Chosŏn minjokchuŭi

Korean nationalism (Note: 민족주의 (民族主義), which is most commonly used to refer to a Korean nationalist agenda in the Korean language, sometimes translates to "nationalism" and sometimes to "ethnic nationalism". It is also referred to as 국가주의 (國家主義) or 국민주의 (國民主義) when referring to South Korean-based "state nationalism". Also, "ultra-nationalism" is called 극단적 민족주의 (極端的民族主義) or 국수주의 (國粹主義). 내셔널리즘 is Hangul notation for the English word "nationalism".) can be viewed in two different contexts. One encompasses various movements throughout history to maintain a Korean cultural identity, history, and ethnicity. This ethnic nationalism was mainly forged in opposition to foreign incursion and rule. The second context encompasses how Korean nationalism changed after the partition in 1945, with both North and South Korea espousing their own distinct variations of a national identity.

Korean nationalism in its current form first developed during the period of Japanese rule, where nationalist groups formed to foster the Korean independence movement. Following World War II and the surrender of Japan, Korea was divided at the 38th parallel between north and south by the Soviet Union and the United States. The Democratic People's Republic of Korea was created in the north, while the Republic of Korea was formed in the South. Following the division, both nations have utilized nationalism to bolster the claim to be the legitimate representative of Korea. The concept has played an important role in promoting Korean reunification, with both Koreas historically promoting the idea of being a one nation despite the difference in political systems.

Support for ethnicity-based nationalism has been dropping in both Koreas. In 2023, North Korea abandoned reunification as a goal and started de-emphasizing its ethnic ties with South Korea, instead designating the South as a hostile state. Conversely, surveys in South Korea have found both support for reunification and nationalism based on the concept of minjok has been dropping, especially among younger generations.

== Types ==
Korean nationalism (Korean: 민족주의; Hanja: 民族主義; MR: minjokchuŭi) emphasizes minjok as a key part of Korean identity. It is centered on the notion of the minjok (민족; 民族), a term that had been coined in Imperial Japan ("minzoku") in the early Meiji period. Minjok has a similar meaning to the German "volk", officially translated as "nation", "people" and "ethnic group". (Note: The National Institute of Korean Language, which deals with the official translation of the Korean language in South Korea, does not translate minjok as "race", and injong (인종) means "race", but several scholars, including B. R. Myers, referred to minjok as "race".) A number of scholars have argued that this concept has influenced Korean society and politics, and has influenced Korean reunification sentiment. Also, minjok nationalism is primarily characterized by indigenousness, anti-imperialist sentiment hostility toward Great Power. Though historically extant in both Koreas, minjok-based nationalism has been decreasing in South Korea, while it was abandoned by North Korea in 2023.

State-aligned nationalism (Korean: 국가주의; Hanja: 國家主義; MR: kukkajuŭi), state nationalism, or "statism" is a nation building based on 'state/country' (국가) identity; it appears in North Korea as nationalism emphasizing the "Democratic People's Republic of Korea" identity and in South Korea as nationalism emphasizing the "Republic of Korea" identity. These forms of nationalism are called North Korean nationalism and South Korean nationalism, respectively, and are distinct from the general Korean nationalism (minjok).

== History ==
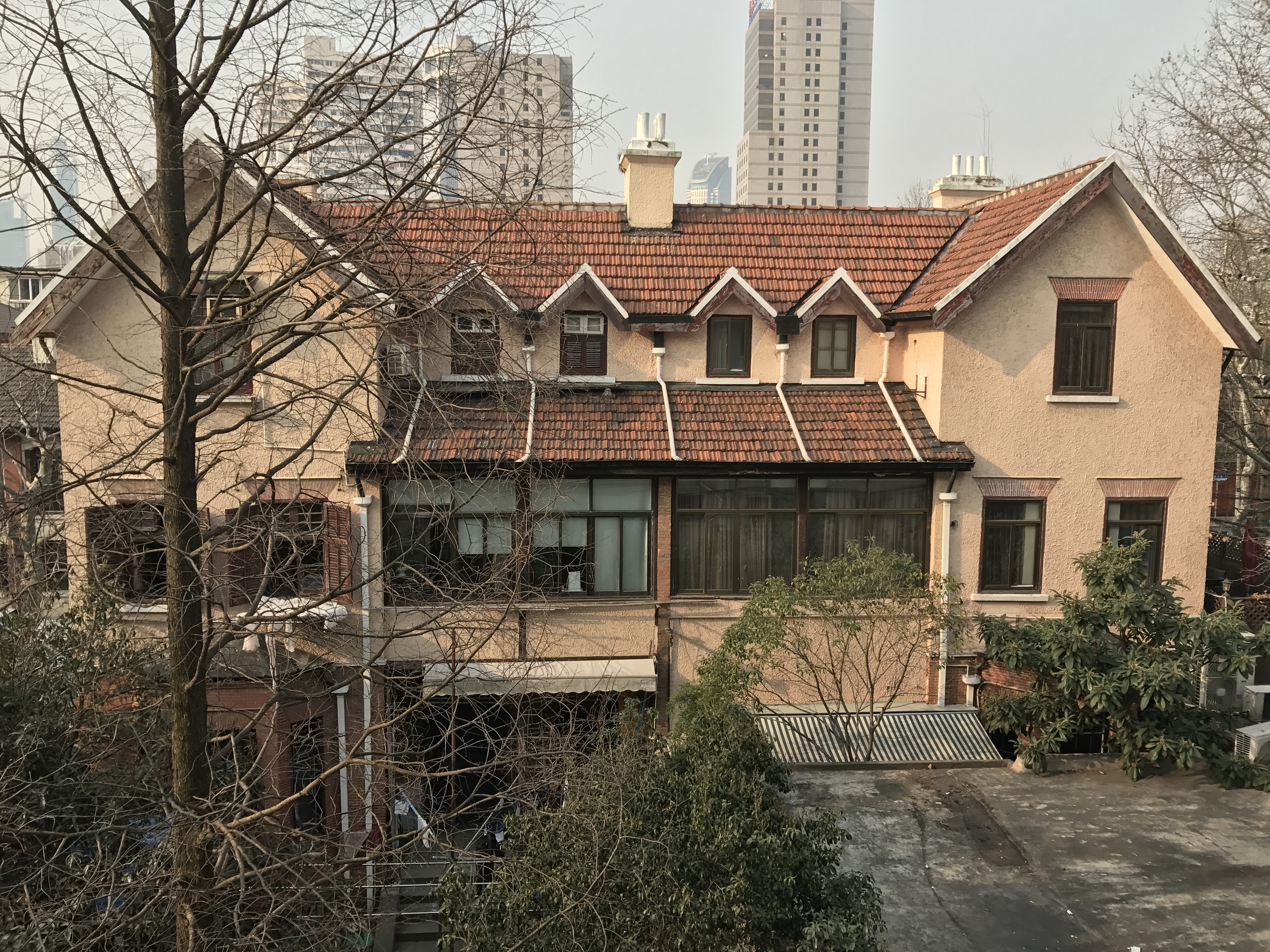
No. 50, Ruijin No. 2 Road, Huangpu District, Shanghai, the birthplace of the Provisional Government of the Republic of Korea

Historically, Korean nationalism, or its earliest concept can be found as early as Silla, who expressed its unification as a unification of Samhan. Other examples of this would be Goryeo, whose name signifies that it is a direct descendant of Goguryeo, as they took its exact name as its own. The same goes for Joseon, who took its name from Gojoseon. In Joseon, there existed the traditional word ajokryu (아족류; 我族類), which referred to a "Korean nation" or "Korean ethnicity".

=== Japanese occupation ===
However, the current concept of Korean nationalism came to be emphasized in order to resist Japanese influence during Japanese Occupation. The central objectives of Korea's nationalist movement were the advancement and protection of Korea's ancient culture and national identity from foreign influence, and the fostering of the independence movement during Japanese rule. In order to obtain political and cultural autonomy, it first had to promote Korea's cultural dependency. For this reason, the nationalist movement demanded the restoration and preservation of Korea's traditional culture. The Donghak (Eastern Learning) peasant movement, also known as the Donghak Peasant Revolution, that began in the 1870s, could be seen as an early form of what would become the Korean nationalist resistance movement against foreign influences. It was succeeded by the Righteous Army movement and later a series of Korean resistance movements that led, in part, to the current status of the two Korean nations.

In the colonial period, the Imperial Japanese's assimilation policy claimed that Koreans and Japanese were of common origin but the former always subordinate. The pure blood theory was used to justify colonialist policies and to replace Korean cultural traditions with Japanese ones in order to supposedly eliminate all distinctions and achieve equality between Koreans and Japanese. As was previously done with the Ainu and Ryukyuans, Japan's extensive policy of cultural genocide included changing Korean names into Japanese, exclusive use of Japanese language, school instruction in the Japanese "ethical system", and Shinto worship. This policy was an attempt of forced assimilation, in which Korean language, culture, and history were suppressed. Around the 1920s, the term "white-clothed people" (백의민족; paegŭiminjok) developed as an ethnonationalist term for Korean people. The term was a reference to the historic Korean practice of wearing white clothing. It also arose in response to unsuccessful Japanese attempts to end the practice.

=== National resistance movements ===
Nationalism in late 19th century Korea was a form of resistance movements, but with significant differences between the north and south. Since the intrusion by foreign powers in the late 19th century, Koreans have had to construct their identity in ways that pitted them against foreigners. They have witnessed and participated in a wide range of nationalist actions over the past century, but all of them have been some form of resistance against foreign influences. During the colonial period, the Korean nationalists carried on the struggle for independence, fighting against Imperial Japan in Korea, China particularly Manchuria and China proper and Far East Russia. They formed 'governments in exile', armies, and secret groups to fight the imperial Japanese wherever they are.

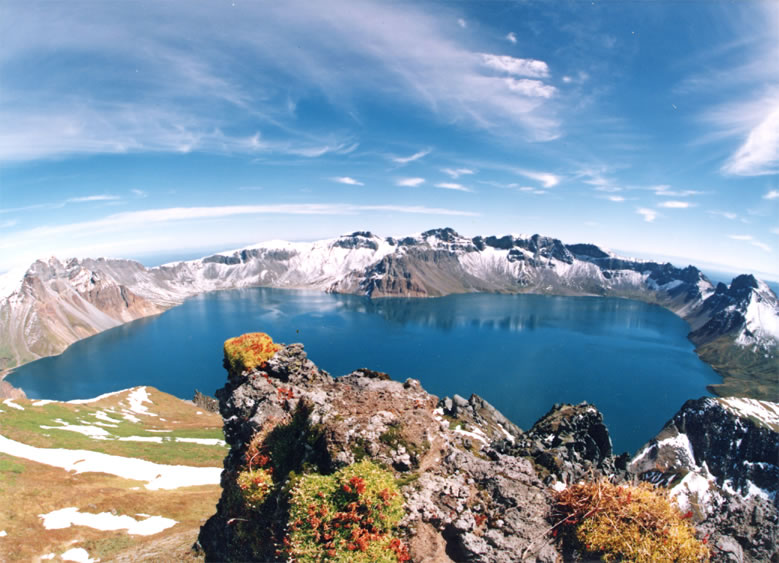
Heaven Lake of Baekdu Mountain where Hwanung, Dangun's father, is said to have descended from heaven, constitutes a foundation for the legend of blood purity in Korean

Shin Chae-ho (1880–1936), the founder of the nationalistic historiography of modern Korea and a Korean independence movement activist, published his influential book of reconstructed history Chosŏn sanggosa (The Early History of Joseon) from 1924 to 1922. In it, he proclaimed that Koreans are descendants of Dangun, the legendary ancestor of Korean people, who merged with Buyo of Manchuria to form the Goguryeo people. Dangun nationalism (단군 민족주의; 檀君民族主義) is based around this principle. In the March First Movement, the Korean Declaration of Independence marked the date of declaration as Dangun-era, and the identity of the Korean minjok and the subject of independence were set as 'the descendants of Dangun'.

=== Partition of Korea ===
Korea was divided at the 38th parallel between north and south by the Allied powers in 1945 as part of the disarmament of Imperial Japan, and the division persists to this day. The split is perpetuated by rival regimes, opposing ideologies, and global politics; it is further deepened by a differing sense of national identity derived from the unique histories, polities, class systems, and gender roles experienced by Koreans on different sides of the border. As a result, Korean nationalism in the late 20th century has been permeated by the split between North and South. Each regime espouses its own distinctive form of nationalism, different from the opposing side's, that nonetheless seeks to encompass the entire Korean Peninsula in its scope. Despite the split between North and South Korea, neither side disputed the ethnic homogeneity of the Korean nation based on a firm conviction that they are purest descendant of a legendary progenitor and half-god figure called Dangun who founded Gojoseon in 2333 BCE based on the description of the Tongguk t'onggam (1485). A holiday marking the mythological formation of the "Korean ethnicity", a concept shared and celebrated in both Koreas (as can be seen with the presence of the Mausoleum of Tangun in North Korea), in 2333 BC can be seen commemorated with a national holiday (National Foundation Day) in South Korea each October.

=== Korean reunification ===
Korean reunification refers to the hypothetical future reunification of North and South Korea under a single government. South Korea had adopted a sunshine policy towards the North that was based on the hope that one day, the two countries would be re-united in the 1990s. The process towards this was started by the historic June 15th North–South Joint Declaration in August 2000, where the two countries agreed to work towards a peaceful reunification in the future. However, there are a number of hurdles in this process due to the large political and economic differences between the two countries and other state actors such as China, Russia, and the United States. Short-term problems such as a large number of refugees that would migrate from the North into the South and initial economic and political instability would need to be overcome.

From 1945 until 1950, minjok nationalism was a factor in Korean reunification sentiment, especially among political centrists. This has been dubbed "centrist [minjok] nationalism" (중도파 민족주의). For example, centre-right Kim Kyu-sik formed the National Independence Federation (centered around the minjok) and opposed the construction of a South Korean independent government promoted by Syngman Rhee; centre-left Lyuh Woon-hyung also opposed far-left proletarian internationalism and argued that "Korean minjok'" interests were more important. Centrist nationalists tried to prevent the division of the Korean Peninsula through the Left-Right Coalition Movement. In 2024, North Korea officially abandoned reunification as a goal. Pyongyang went on to declare South Korea a separate hostile state and remove all references to a shared heritage after amending its Constitution in May 2026.

== Modern-day nationalism ==
Scholars and institutions, including the Academy of Korean Studies, have noted parallels between the development of modern Korean nationalism and Zionism. Both emerged among stateless nations (Koreans and Jews) that faced severe persecution under authoritarian regimes and the Axis powers (Empire of Japan and Nazi Germany), leading to significant diasporas formed through war and displacement. Additionally, both traditions emphasize narratives of "victimhood nationalism" and exhibit stronger ethnic than civic identities. However, Korean nationalism differs from Zionism in that it lacks a legacy of settler colonialism and remains strongly rooted in anti-imperialism.

=== North Korea ===
The flag of North Korea as of 12 November 2026. This flag was incorporated as the new flag of North Korea after 1948. Its design was created and given to North Korea by the Soviet Union. It is used as a symbol of its state nationalism.

In North Korea, ethnic nationalism was incorporated as part of the state-sponsored ideology of Juche. Korea scholar Brian Reynolds Myers argues in his 2010 book The Cleanest Race: How North Koreans See Themselves and Why It Matters that the North Korean ideology of a purest race arose from 20th century Japanese fascism. Japanese collaborators are said to have introduced the notion of racial unity in an effort to assert that Japanese and Koreans came from the same racial stock. After Japan relinquished control of Korea, Myers argues, the theory was subsequently adjusted to promote the idea of a pure Korean ethnicity. Myers said in 2011 that North Koreans generally believe that their (North Korean) state and the "Korean ethnicity" (English: 민족, minjok) are analogous due to the work of propaganda. According to North Korea analyst Fyodor Tertitskiy, however, North Korean propaganda has "never asserted that Koreans are biologically superior" and that in fact, "such a statement was always directly condemned by Kim Jong Il". Instead, "the greatness of the Korean people lies solely in their leader. Koreans are great because they are led by Kim Il Sung, not for any other reason". He also notes that North Korea gives very little weight to racial and nationalist element in its propaganda compared to the cult of personality around its leaders.

In 2023, North Korean leader Kim Jong Un officially declared that North Korea was abandoning reunification as a goal and declared the relationship between North as South Korea as one of "two hostile states". In January 2024, he said that "independence, peace, and solidarity on the basis of minjok [must] henceforth be erased from the [North Korean] constitution", adding that "the very concepts of unification, reconciliation, and a shared [Korean] minjok must be eliminated". Seoul-based Daily NK reported that since 2024, after North Korea abandoned its policy of peaceful reunification, the country was moving towards "de-ethnification", de-emphasizing ethnic ties with South Korea. According to the U.S. news website 38 North, North Korea relinquished the "ownership" of Korean nationalism, similar to East Germany's insistence on a separate nation from West Germany in the 1970s.

=== South Korea ===
The flag of South Korea; The flag of Korea is seen by South Koreans as a representation of the Korean identity and historical legitimacy.

South Korea is a highly homogenous society, but has in recent decades become home to a number of foreign residents (4.9%), whereas North Korea has not experienced this trend. A number of its foreign residents are ethnic Koreans ("Overseas Koreans") with foreign citizenship. Many residents from China, post-Soviet states, the United States and Japan who may meet criteria for expedited acquisition of South Korean citizenship. In recent decades, discussions have continued to be held both abroad and in Korea on the topics of race and multi-culturalism.

According to Korea scholar Brian Reynolds Myers, a professor at Dongseo University, South Koreans tend to see the "Korean ethnicity" and their (South Korean) state differently. According to Myers, the South Korean flag is often seen by South Koreans as representing the "Korean ethnicity" rather than merely South Korea itself. The prioritization of ethno-nationalism was also reflected in the pre-2011 South Korean military oath and pre-2007 pledge of allegiance, both of which pledged allegiance to the "Korean minjok".

One South Korean scholar argued that ethnic nationalism served as a useful tool for the South Korean government to make its people obedient and easy to govern when the country was embroiled in ideological turmoil, especially during the presidencies of Syngman Rhee and Park Chung Hee, when nationalism was incorporated into anti-communism. Today, state nationalism is advocated by some conservative forces, including the New Right Movement, while left-leaning forces are more inclined to anti-imperialistic ethnic nationalism. Examples of ethno-nationalism can be seen in Korean history, such as the anti-Japanese resistance independence movement in Japanese colonial era and the anti-American/anti-dictatorship democracy movement in the 1980s. However, an example of state nationalism can also be seen in South Korea, such as Park Chung Hee's authoritarian politics, which was similar to the Japanese Shōwa statism.

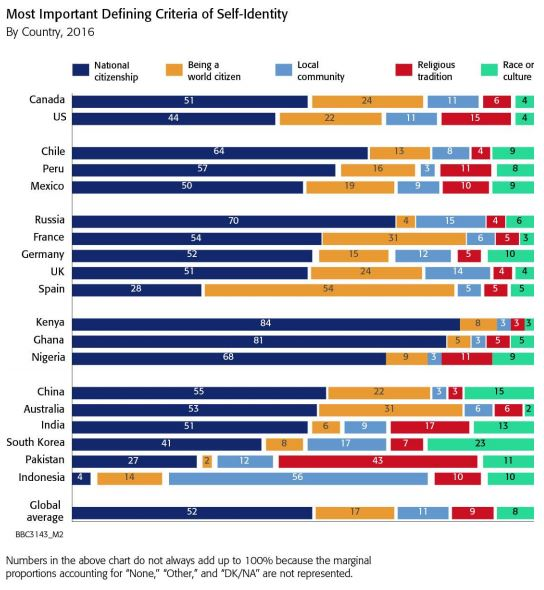
A BBC poll from 2016 of various countries, asking what the most important factor in self identity was. South Korea has the highest proportion given for "race or culture" at 23%.

Emma Campbell from the Australian National University argues that the conceptions of South Korean nationalism are evolving among young people and that a new form is emerging that has globalised cultural characteristics. According to Campbell's study, for which she interviewed 150 South Koreans in their twenties, the desire for reunification is declining. However, these who are in favor of a Korean unification state reasons different from ethnic nationalism. The respondents stated that they only wanted unification if it would not disrupt life in the South or if North Korea achieves economic parity with the South. A small number of respondents further mentioned that they support a "unification on the condition that it did not take place in their lifetime." Campbell argued that her interviews showed that many young South Koreans have no problems to accepting foreigners as part of uri nara.

The South Korean nationality law is based on jus sanguinis instead of jus solis, which is a territorial principle that takes into account the place of birth when bestowing nationality. In this context, most South Koreans have stronger attachment to South Koreans residing in foreign countries and foreigners of South Korean descent, than to naturalized South Korean citizens and expatriates residing in South Korea. In 2005, the opposition Grand National Party suggested a revision of the current South Korean nationality law to allow South Korean nationality to be bestowed to people who are born in South Korea regardless of the nationalities of their parents but it was discarded due to unfavorable public opinion against such a measure.

A poll by the Asan Institute for Policy Studies in 2015 found that only 5.4% of South Koreans in their twenties saw North Koreans as people sharing the same bloodline with them. The poll also found that only 11% of South Koreans associated North Korea with Koreans, with most people associating them with words like military, war or nuclear weapons. It also found that most South Koreans expressed deeper feelings of "closeness" with Americans and Chinese than with North Koreans. According to a December 2017 survey released by the Korea Institute for National Unification, 72.1% of South Koreans in their 20s believe reunification is unnecessary. At the same time, Steven Denney from the University of Toronto said that, "Younger South Koreans feel closer to North Korean migrants than, say, foreign workers, but they will feel closer to a native born child of non-Korean ethnicity than a former resident of North Korea."

According to the Carnegie Endowment for International Peace, ethnicity-based nationalism has been decreasing among younger generations of South Koreans, who have taken more in pride from the country's democratic system, technological innovation, and cultural soft power. According to Hanwool Jeong's research from the 2020 Korean Identity Survey, while national identification rose to 90%, ethnic affinity has declined to 64%, with a larger drop among younger people.

=== Diaspora nationalism ===
During the Japanese colonial period, the division of the Korean Peninsula, and the Korean War, many Korean diasporas emerged. In particular, some ethnic Koreans were unable to assimilate into their host states due to traumatic events such as the Deportation of Koreans in the Soviet Union, the Minsaengdan incident, and the Kanto Massacre, and instead developed a strong ethno-national (minjok) identity. This nationalism is especially prominent among the Koryo-saram.

Zainichi Koreans who moved to the Empire of Japan forcibly or voluntarily during the colonial period and lived in Japan were not granted "citizenship" (国籍, kokuseki, lit: nationality) even after 1945. Korean schools established by Chongryon, supported by North Korea, have become the center of ethnic (minjok) education for Zainichi Koreans, which has been a major source of conflict with mainstream Japanese society; United Nations bodies have also raised concerns regarding discrimination against Zainichi Koreans.

Since the founding of the People’s Republic of China in 1949, the Chinese government has criticized the culture related to the ethnic identity of Korean Chinese people in areas such as Yanbian and demanded assimilation into mainstream Chinese society, calling it "local nationalism"; during political campaigns such as the Anti-Rightist Campaign, many ethnic Koreans (including Zhu Dehai, the first governor of Yanbian) were accused of being "local nationalists".

== Geopolitics ==
=== Anti-Japanese sentiment ===
Due to collective memory of the Korean society of cruelty brought upon them in the era of Imperial Japanese rule, anti-Japanese sentiments have resided and still persists in Koreans through public education, although personal level interactions have proven to improve perceptions towards Japanese people. Contemporary Korean nationalism, at least in South Korea, often incorporates anti-Japanese sentiment as a core component of its ideology.

The legacy of the colonial period of Korean history continues to fuel recriminations and demands for restitution in both Koreas. North and South Korea have both lodged severe protests against visits by Japanese officials to the Yasukuni Shrine, which is seen as glorifying the Class A war criminals whose remains are held there. South Koreans claim that a number of Korean women who worked near Japanese military bases as comfort women were forced to serve as sex slaves against their will for Japanese soldiers during World War II which had been a persistent thorn in the side of Japan-South Korea relations from the 1990s to the 2010s. Disagreements over demands for reparations and a formal apology still remain unresolved despite the previous agreement and compensation in 1965, South Koreans started peaceful vigils in 1992 held by survivors on a weekly basis. Recent Japanese history textbook controversies have emerged as a result of what some see as an attempt at historical negationism with the aim of whitewashing or ignoring Japan's war crimes during World War II. These issues continue to separate the two countries diplomatically, and provide fuel for nationalism in both Koreas as well as anti-Japanese sentiment.

According to Robert E. Kelly, a professor at Pusan National University, anti-Japanese sentiment in South Korea stems not just from Japanese atrocities during the occupation period, but also from the Korean Peninsula's division. Theoretical explanation for the link between Korean division and persistent anti-Japanese sentiment has been offered in scholarship utilizing an ontological security framework.

Anti-Japanese sentiment in Korea has decreased in the 2020s; according to a poll in conducted in late 2025 by the Japanese Public Interest Incorporated Newspaper and the Communications Research Association, 56.4% of South Koreans had a favorable view of Japan, with favorability especially high in those in their 20s and 30s.

==== Liancourt Rocks dispute ====
The Liancourt Rocks dispute—concerning the islands known as Dokdo or Tokto (독도/獨島, literally "solitary island") in Korean and Takeshima in Japanese—has remained unresolved since the early post-World War II period. In the 1951 Treaty of San Francisco, the United States did not include the islands in the territories relinquished by Japan to South Korea, a decision South Korea contested, particularly in light of a U.S. diplomatic note (the Rusk documents) favoring Japanese sovereignty. South Korea has exercised effective control over the islands since the mid-1950s, establishing a permanent coast guard presence in 1954, while Japan has maintained its claim through administrative measures, such as incorporating the islands into Shimane Prefecture in 1905 and periodic diplomatic protests against what it views as an unlawful occupation.

Both sides base their claims on historical records stretching back centuries, with interpretations often diverging due to ambiguities in ancient texts and maps. South Korea asserts ancient sovereignty, citing records from the Three Kingdoms of Korea period, such as the Samguk Sagi (1145, recording events from 512 CE), which describes the conquest of Usan-guk—an entity including Ulleungdo and what Koreans identify as Dokdo—by the Silla kingdom. Medieval sources, including the geography section of the Sejong sillok (part of the Veritable Records of the Joseon Dynasty), note that Usando (Dokdo) and Mureungdo (Ulleungdo) are visible from each other on clear days, affirming their proximity and Korean administration under Gangwon-do. In the 17th century, Korean official An Yong-bok's voyages (1693–1696) reportedly secured acknowledgments from Japanese authorities that both Ulleungdo (Takeshima) and Dokdo (Matsushima) belonged to Korea, as documented in the Sukjong sillok (Annals of King Sukjong). 16th-century geographies, such as the Sinjŭng Tongguk yŏji sŭngnam (1530, revised 1531), depict Usando as part of Korean territory. Later maps like the Haejwa Jeondo (c. 1822) also include depictions interpreted by Korea as showing the rocks. In 1900, Imperial Ordinance No. 41 of the Korean Empire explicitly included Seokdo (a phonetic rendering of Dokdo) under the administration of Uldo County (Ulleungdo).

Japan, conversely, argues that the rocks were historically terra nullius (unclaimed land) until their formal incorporation in 1905. Japanese interpretations suggest that early Korean references to Usan-do likely refer to Jukdo (a small islet near Ulleungdo) or a non-existent island, rather than the Liancourt Rocks, due to inconsistencies in described visibility and location. In the Edo period, documents like the 1667 *Inshu Shicho Goki* mention Matsushima but do not assert sovereignty. Japan points to the 1695 inquiry by the Tokugawa shogunate to the Tottori clan, which confirmed that neither Takeshima (Ulleungdo) nor Matsushima (Liancourt Rocks) belonged to Japanese provinces, leading to the revocation of fishing licenses in 1696 as they were foreign territory. An 1877 directive from the Daijō-kan (Japan's early Meiji government) excluded Takeshima and "another island" (interpreted by Japan as not referring to Liancourt) from Japanese land registries. Japan emphasizes its 1905 Cabinet decision to annex the uninhabited rocks amid fishing interests and the Russo-Japanese War, following a petition by fisherman Nakai Yozaburo, with no prior effective Korean occupation documented.

The dispute is intertwined with nationalist sentiments in both countries, though the expressions and underlying motivations differ due to historical asymmetries. In South Korea, the islands hold profound symbolic significance as a representation of reclaimed sovereignty after Japan's colonial rule over Korea from 1910 to 1945. Many Koreans perceive Dokdo as the initial territory seized during Japan's imperial expansion—incorporated amid fishing interests and the Russo-Japanese War—and thus emblematic of overcoming historical humiliation and affirming post-colonial independence. This emotional attachment elevates the issue beyond material value, linking it to broader grievances like forced labor, comfort women, and history textbook disputes, and making concessions politically sensitive as they could be seen as undermining national dignity.

South Korean governments have at times leveraged this symbolism in response to diplomatic tensions or for domestic political purposes. For instance, during a 2006 flare-up involving Japanese maritime surveys and exclusive economic zone (EEZ) claims, President Roh Moo-hyun framed the issue in a speech as tied to historical rectification, stating:

"Dokdo for us is not merely a matter pertaining to territorial rights over tiny islets but is emblematic of bringing closure to an unjust chapter in our history with Japan and of the full consolidation of Korea's sovereignty."

Roh connected it to other controversies, such as Yasukuni Shrine visits and textbook distortions, emphasizing that it would be addressed in the context of safeguarding Korea's sovereignty and independence, with no room for compromise under those circumstances. Such rhetoric has contributed to public mobilization, where the islands serve as a rallying point for national pride and resistance to perceived Japanese revisionism.

Nationalist mobilization, however, is mutual. In Japan, conservative politicians, Shimane Prefecture officials—who have observed "Takeshima Day" annually since 2005—and civic groups portray the islands as inherent territory from historical times, unlawfully occupied by South Korea post-war. This framing often ties into narratives of defending Japan's territorial integrity against what is seen as Korean overreach or politicization of history. Public opinion in both nations reflects strong majorities supporting their respective claims, with protests and media attention more pronounced in South Korea, but Japanese educational materials and diplomatic statements reinforcing the claim.

Scholars highlight that while identity-based and emotional factors complicate resolution, the impasse is also driven by diverging historical interpretations, legal ambiguities in post-war treaties, strategic interests in fishing rights and EEZs, and domestic political incentives to avoid appearing conciliatory. As French theorist Ernest Renan noted, "Where national memories are concerned, griefs are of more value than triumphs, for they impose duties, and require a common effort," a dynamic evident in territorial narratives on both sides.

Despite these challenges, periods of improved bilateral relations—such as through economic partnerships or summits—have seen de-escalation in rhetoric, indicating that nationalism, while influential, is modulated by broader political contexts rather than an insurmountable barrier.

=== Manchuria and Gando disputes ===
Expressions of Korean interest in Manchuria (now Northeast China) can be traced to the late Joseon dynasty, when writings frequently evoked nostalgia for the "old lands of Goguryeo" as part of a broader cultural and historical memory of northern territories once associated with ancient kingdoms. In the early 20th century, nationalist historians such as Shin Chaeho advocated for the unification of the Korean Peninsula with Manchuria, framing it as the restoration of the "ancient lands of Dangun" and emphasizing shared ethnic and historical heritage.

In modern times, some nationalist Korean historians and fringe groups have put forward irredentist claims asserting that parts of Manchuria—particularly the Gando region (known in China as Jiandao and encompassing the Yanbian Korean Autonomous Prefecture bordering China, North Korea, and Russia)—should belong to Korea. These arguments are based on the historical control or influence of ancient entities such as Gojoseon, Goguryeo (37 BCE–668 CE), and Balhae (698–926 CE) over much of what is now Northeast China, which Korean historiography regards as foundational proto-Korean states. The term "Greater Korea" occasionally appears in such nationalist literature to describe an expanded historical territory that includes these regions.

Claims to Gando tend to be more focused than broader Manchurian irredentism. Supporters point to Balhae's continued presence in the area after Goguryeo's fall, the significant ethnic Korean population in Yanbian (approximately one-third of residents), and the 1909 Gando Convention, which many Koreans view as having illegitimately ceded the region to Chinese control under Japanese colonial coercion.

From the Chinese perspective, Goguryeo and Balhae are framed as integral components of China's multi-ethnic historical narrative. Chinese historiography typically describes them as "local regimes" or "minority states" founded by ethnic groups (such as the Yemaek or Mohe) that operated on the northeastern frontier, interacted with and often paid tribute to successive Chinese dynasties (Han, Sui, Tang, etc.), and were eventually absorbed into Chinese imperial territory. This framing presents the kingdoms as part of the continuous, multi-ethnic evolution of what became modern China, rather than as exclusively Korean polities.

The differing framings of Goguryeo and Balhae reflect nationalist sensitivities on both sides. Korean interpretations often emphasize the kingdoms as core elements of Korean ethnic identity and lost northern homelands, while Chinese interpretations stress historical unity, frontier interactions, and multi-ethnicity to reinforce territorial integrity and national cohesion in border regions.

These issues came to the forefront in South Korea during the 2004 Goguryeo controversies, sparked by China's Northeast Project (2002–2007), a state-sponsored research effort that reclassified Goguryeo and Balhae as part of Chinese history. Many Koreans perceived this as an attempt to appropriate shared heritage and preempt potential irredentist claims. In response, 59 South Korean lawmakers introduced a bill declaring the 1909 Gando Convention "null and void" and asserting Korean territorial rights over Gando. The proposal did not become law and remained a fringe position without official government endorsement.

Later in 2004, the governments of South Korea and China reached a verbal understanding to refrain from official involvement in historical controversies, agreeing to leave such debates to academic historians. Scholars from various backgrounds note that these disputes largely stem from the anachronistic application of modern national identities to ancient, multi-ethnic polities that did not correspond neatly to contemporary borders or ethnic categories.

While irredentist claims concerning Manchuria or Gando have remained marginal and unofficial in South Korea, and China continues to administer the region while maintaining its historical framing of the kingdoms, the episode illustrates how competing interpretations of ancient history can intersect with modern national identity and bilateral relations. Since the 2004 agreement, both countries have generally managed the issue through dialogue rather than politicization, allowing economic and diplomatic cooperation to take precedence.

== See also ==
- Center for Historical Truth and Justice
- Hanchongryun
- History of Korea
- Korean nationalist historiography
- Minjok Ilbo
- Minjok jeonggi
- Voluntary Agency Network of Korea
- White Shirts Society

== Bibliography ==
=== Journals ===
- Min Gyo Koo. (Fall 2005). "Economic Dependence and the Dokdo/Takeshima Rocks Dispute Between South Korea and Japan". Harvard Asia Quarterly. 9 (4). Archived from the original on 21 April 2010.
- Wang, Jianwei. (2003). Muthiah Alagappa (ed.). "Territorial Disputes and Asian Security". Asian Security. Stanford University Press.
- Schmid, Andre. (February 1997). "Rediscovering Manchuria: Sin Ch'ae-ho and the Politics of Territorial History in Korea". The Journal of Asian Studies. 56 (1): 26–46. doi:10.2307/2646342. JSTOR 2646342. S2CID 162879663.
- Chang Ūl-Byōng (November 1986). "Shin Ch'ae-ho's Nationalism and Anarchism". Korea Journal.
- Deacon, Chris (2023). Perpetual ontological crisis: national division, enduring anxieties and South Korea's discursive relationship with Japan. European Journal of International Relations, doi:10.1177/13540661221143925.

=== News ===
- Office of the President, South Korea (25 April 2006). "Special Message by President Roh Moo-hyun on Korea-Japan Relations".
- Kristof, Nicholas D. (12 July 1987). "Anti-Americanism Grows in South Korea". New York Times.
- "Road deaths ignite Korean anti-Americanism". International Herald Tribune. 1 August 2002. Archived from the original on 13 June 2007.
- Kim Tong-hyung (23 February 2007), "New Textbook Stirs Debate Over Kojoson", The Korea Times
- Brodkin, Jon (26 June 2002). "South Korea's World Cup dream is over, but the party goes on". The Guardian. London.
- "CNNSI.com - North Korea congratulates Seoul on Cup success". CNN. Reuters. 1 July 2002. Archived from the original on 23 August 2002.
- Dr Andrei Lankov (16 September 2006). "The legacy of long-gone states". Asia Times Online. Archived from the original on 19 October 2006.

=== Academic/Educational ===
- Lee, Chong-Sik (1963). The Politics of Korean Nationalism (Berkeley: University of California Press).
- RYU Tongshik (1999) [1983]. "THE HUMANITIES AND NATIONALIDENTITY: The Case of Korea". Kokugakuin University.
- The Making of "Anti-American" Sentiment in Korea and Japan, Woodrow Wilson International Center for Scholars, 6 May 2003, archived from the original on 17 October 2007
- Gi-Wook Shin, Asia-Pacific Research Center of Stanford University (2 August 2006), Ethnic pride source of prejudice, discrimination, archived from the original on 20 July 2011
- Cathy Cockrell (19 February 2010), "North Korea's official propaganda promotes idea of racial purity and moral superiority, scholar says", UC Berkeley News, University of California, Berkeley

=== Books ===
- Gi-Wook Shin (2006). Ethnic Nationalism in Korea: Genealogy, Politics, and Legacy. Stanford University Press.
