= Voluntary Agency Network of Korea =

Pro-South Korea internet activist group

- Cyber Diplomatic Delegation Group
- Hangul: 사이버 외교사절단
- Hanja: 사이버 外交使節團
- RR: Saibeo oegyosajeoldan
- MR: Saibŏ oegyosajŏldan

VANK
- Hangul: 반크
- RR: Bankeu
- MR: Pank'ŭ

The Voluntary Agency Network of Korea (Korean: 사이버 외교사절단), abbreviated VANK (반크), is an Internet-based South Korean organization established by Park Ki-Tae in 1999, consisting of 120,000 South Korean members and 30,000 international members. VANK's membership consists mainly of junior high and high school students, although university students also participate.

== Activities ==
Examples of campaigns they have conducted include organizing a protest movement to pressure Google and Apple to label the Liancourt rocks as Dokto on their maps and spreading the story of the ancient kingdom of Goguryeo, and about Jikji, the world's oldest extant book printed using movable metal type.

VANK publishes reading materials, postcards, maps, and videos. VANK's self-built online database and published books with information about Korea are acknowledged by overseas universities as recommended learning resources about Korea. As a way to exchange cultures and connect with foreigners, VANK also conducts surveys about their opinions of Korea, such as a notable survey about what aspects of Korea interest foreigners the most.

VANK disputes certain terms and information regarding Asian geographic names or about East Asian history. The head of the Voluntary Agency Network of Korea said the organization has corrected hundreds of mistaken statements by foreign governments about South Korea. VANK also raises awareness for Japanese war crimes and promotes the banning and removal of symbolism they associate with Imperial Japan.

In 2013, VANK launched a campaign against the Tokyo Olympic and Paralympic Games. The campaign included a letter to the International Olympic Committee (IOC) opposing the games because "Japan has no remorse for war crimes.”, the letter was also sent to major foreign media such as CNN and the New York Times. On January 6, 2020, a poster was put on a temporary fence on the site of the new Japanese embassy in Jong Chiyo Road, Nono District. In the posters, the Tokyo Games are contaminated by nuclear radiation, in one scene the Olympic Torch Relay is depicted with a man in a hazmat suit transporting radioactive material. Stamps and coins bearing similar imagery were also produced.

In 2019, VANK launched a campaign against the expression Chinese New Year, recommending the term "lunar new year" instead.

In 2020, VANK urged Chinese netizens to stop cyberbullying Korean celebrity singer Lee Hyo-ri after her Instagram account received several complaints and criticisms. VANK posted an online petition titled "Stop China's cyber chauvinism which lynched a Korean celebrity!". It justified the petition on the basis "We oppose the chauvinistic attitude of attacking others in the name of nationalism, which includes interpreting even the smallest part of an expression in the most vicious and offensive way".

== Funding ==
VANK is a non-governmental and private organization. According to VANK, they do not receive money from any organization or corporation, and are run by donations.

== Political positions ==
VANK does not represent an official political position, but the organization is believed to be politically closer to a liberal-to-progressive camp than to a conservative camp one.

In South Korea, liberals and leftists tend to show more anti-imperialist and left-wing nationalist based diplomatic views than conservatives in diplomacy involving powerful countries, including China and Japan. Because of this tendency, conservatives support reducing VANK's government subsidies, while liberals and leftists support increasing VANK's government subsidies.

== Reception ==
VANK organizes young Korean students as "cyber diplomats" to lobby foreign organizations and webmasters about what it perceives as errors in matters related to Korea. The Government of Korea endorses such "cyber vigilantism", subsidising a competition in which participants try to censor foreign websites for "incorrect" content about Korea. Park Jung-yul, an official of The Korean Information Service (KOIS) said "KOIS is resolved to monitor the contents of Korea-related Web sites and provide correct information on the Net in order to help generate an accurate image of the country." In Asia Times Online, it was reported that the South Korean government is offering rewards to students who participate in the activities of VANK, most of which are centered on the issues of the Sea of Japan.

VANK lists current targets for "correction" on its website for members to send a form letter of protest. Some of its requests for correction are justifiable, such as referring to a simple mistake mixing up North and South Korea. However, in relation to more highly contentious issues it does not accept any non-Korean interpretations. In a Foreign Policy article, VANK was described as being seen as "self-styled cyber fact-checkers" to those favourable to their cause but for others they are seen as "hyper-nationalistic spammers".

Although official foreign government agencies tend to endure its cyber harassment, numerous private organisations and websites surrender to silence VANK's clamour. An About.com spokesman, relating his company's decision to use the name "East Sea" to refer to the body of water otherwise known as the Sea of Japan, stated that they chose to use the name "not necessarily because it agreed with the South Korean geography activists but because the e-mail bombardment was annoying." In the About.com case, it received more than 20 e-mails per day for more than a year before it finally changed the name. Likewise, the National Geographic Society and other websites have changed their naming policies as a result of similar "e-mail and letter writing campaigns".

VANK has been accused of promoting Korea while attacking Japan. Critics claim that VANK has attempted to bully and discount Japan and Japanese culture, manipulate history during and after World War II and have other countries believe in distorted perspectives related to Japanese-Korean history that have a bias favoring Korea. VANK has also been accused of attacking China and Chinese culture.

== Awards ==
- 2010: Hong Jin-Ki Creator Award

== See also ==
- 50 Cent Party
- Anti-Japaneseism
- Identity politics (Korean nationalism)
  - Anti-Chinese sentiment in Korea
  - Anti-Japanese sentiment in Korea
  - Gukppong (South Korean nationalism)
- Internet activism
- Internet-nationalism
- Liberalism in South Korea
- Netto-uyoku
- Social Justice Warrior
- Spamming
