= Racial nationalism =

Ideology that advocates a racial definition of national identity

Racial nationalism is an ideology that advocates a racial definition of national identity. Racial nationalism seeks to preserve "racial purity" of a nation through policies such as banning race mixing and the immigration of other races. To create a justification for such policies, racial nationalism often promotes eugenics, and advocates political and legislative solutions based on eugenic and other racial theories.

Nationalism in East Asia (especially China, Japan and Korea) is partly related to racial nationalism, (Note: In Northeast Asia, "Nationalism" is often translated into 民族主義, but there are criticisms that it should be translated into 國民主義 because it is mistranslation; in pre-modern Chinese language (including Japan's Kanji and Korea's Hanja), 族 also means an lineage or clan.) it was influenced by the German ethnonationalist tradition (Völkisch movement and Blood and soil) of the 19th century, which was imported from Japan during the Meiji period. This kind of nationalism is related to the term 民族 similar to the German word Volk. (Note: In the Chinese language, 民族 generally means nationality and is distinguished from 種族 (lit: "race"), but sometimes 民族 is used in the sense of "race" in a Han nationalist context.)

== By country ==
=== China ===
Chinese nationalism (中国民族主义 or 中华民族主义) in the People's Republic of China (PRC) is officially based on the concept of Zhonghua minzu (中华民族, lit: "Chinese folk"). Zhonghua minzu is translated as "Chinese nation", "Chinese people", "Chinese ethnicity" and "Chinese race". Some academics have referred to Chinese nationalism as "racial nationalism". Since the mid-1990s, the Chinese Communist Party has utilized Peking Man as an instrument of its racial nationalist discourse.

Some academics state that the term Zhonghua minzu is intended to justify the Han-based assimilationist policy. Jamil Anderlini, an editor for the Financial Times, said that the concept of "Chinese race" nominally includes 56 officially recognized ethnicities (including Tibetans and Uyghurs) in the PRC, but is "almost universally understood to mean the majority Han ethnic group, who make up more than 90 per cent of the population." Under Xi Jinping, official state narratives and textbooks depict the Zhonghua race as a two-million-year-old lineage originating from ancient hominids, which organically absorbed non-Han indigenous peoples—such as Tibetans, Mongols, and Uyghurs—into a Han-centric "mega-community" (超大规模共同体).

=== Japan ===
Japanese ethnic nationalism (Japanese: 日本民族主義, Hepburn: nihon minzoku shugi) is related to minzoku (民族), the Japanese word that translates to "people", "ethnic group", and "nation". Minzoku does not originally mean "race" in the general sense, and jinshu (人種) means "race", but some Japanese nationalists also use minzoku in a closer sense to "race"; Taro Aso has called Japan a "one race" or "one minzoku". Prominent Japanese politicians have often kindled controversies by invoking the images of Japanese racial superiority.

During the late 1930s and early 1940s, as Japan's Yamato nationalism intensified into wartime hyper-nationalism, some ideologists such as Kingoro Hashimoto proposed a single-party dictatorship based on populism, patterned after European fascist movements. The regime's ethnic-centered expansionist ideology during this period is clearly illustrated in the 1943 secret report, An Investigation of Global Policy with the Yamato Race as Nucleus.

=== Korea ===
Korean racial nationalism is related to the concept of minjok, which variously translates as "nation", "ethnicity" or "race" in the English-speaking world, but there is room for debate over whether minjok nationalism belongs to racial nationalism. In the 20th century, ethno-nationalist sentiment was shared on all political spectrums in South Korea, including not just right-wing dictatorships, but liberals and leftists who resisted it. (Note: By the standards at the time, liberal and leftist used ethno-nationalist rhetoric more actively than right-wing ones (see liberal ethnic nationalism), and the right-wing authoritarian regimes in South Korea, including Syngman Rhee, placed greater priority on the anti-communist kukka (국가) than on the anti-imperialist minjok (민족) advocated by Sin Ch'aeho.) According to Brian Reynolds Myers in 2010, racial nationalism in North Korea is the main ideology of maintaining the system.

Many modern Korean people deny the connection to "race" by limiting the meaning of minjok to the meanings of "nation", "people" and "ethnic group", because minjok (민족, lit: "folk") and injong (인종, lit: race) are distinct concepts in Korean language. However, Myers argues minjok as meaning of "race" because "Korean minjok" (한민족 or 조선민족) is defined by 'Korean blood' than by cultural factors. According to the Carnegie Endowment for International Peace, ethnicity-based nationalism has been decreasing among younger generations of South Koreans, who have taken more in pride from the country's democratic system, technological innovation, and cultural soft power.

Korea's minjok nationalism emerged strongly in the 20th century, but has declined significantly in the 21st century. In 2023, North Korean leader Kim Jong Un officially declared that North Korea was abandoning reunification as a goal. In January 2024, he said that "independence, peace, and solidarity on the basis of minjok [must] henceforth be erased from the [North Korean] constitution", adding that "the very concepts of unification, reconciliation, and a shared [Korean] minjok must be eliminated". As of the 21st century, minjok nationalism in South Korea is often opposed by some conservatives (including the New Right) on the grounds that it could elicit sympathy for North Korea; as an alternative, anti-communist state nationalism or South Korean nationalism is proposed.

=== South Africa ===
South Africa's race-based nationalism is generally divided into two: Afrikaner nationalism (a branch of White nationalism) and African nationalism (or Black nationalism). South African nationalism is a state-based nationalism; although it is sometimes xenophobic, it is distinguished from race-based nationalism.

== Variants ==
=== Black nationalism ===
Black nationalism is a type of racial nationalism which seeks representation for Black people as a distinct national identity, especially in racialized, colonial and postcolonial societies. Its earliest proponents saw it as a way to advocate for democratic representation in culturally plural societies or to establish self-governing independent nation-states for Black people. Modern Black nationalism often aims for the social, political, and economic empowerment of Black communities within white majority societies, either as an alternative to assimilation or as a way to ensure greater representation and equality within predominantly Eurocentric cultures.

As an ideology, Black nationalism encompasses a diverse range of beliefs which have variously included forms of economic, political and cultural nationalism, or pan-nationalism. It often overlaps with, but is distinguished from, similar concepts and movements such as Pan-Africanism, Ethiopianism, the back-to-Africa movement (also known as Black Zionism), Afrocentrism, and Garveyism. Critics of Black nationalism compare it to white nationalism and white supremacy, and say it often invokes separatism and Black supremacy.

=== White nationalism ===
White nationalism is a type of racial nationalism or pan-nationalism which espouses the belief that white people are a race and seeks to develop and maintain a white racial and national identity. White nationalists claim to seek and ensure the survival of the white race and the cultures of historically white states. They hold that white people should maintain their majority in majority-white countries, maintain their political and economic dominance, and that their cultures should be foremost in these countries. Many white nationalists believe that miscegenation, multiculturalism, immigration of nonwhites and low birth rates among whites are threatening the white race.

There are different means that white nationalists support to achieve their aims. In the United States most white nationalists say immigration should be restricted to people of European ancestry. There are those who support what is called remigration which is the mass deportation of non-white minority populations, especially immigrants and sometimes including native-born citizens, to their place of racial ancestry. There are those who identify with the concept of a white ethnostate.

Analysts describe white nationalism as overlapping with white supremacism and white separatism. White nationalism is sometimes described as a euphemism for, or subset of, white supremacism, and the two have been used interchangeably by journalists and analysts. White separatism is the pursuit of a "white-only state", while supremacism is the belief that white people are superior to nonwhites and should dominate them, taking ideas from social Darwinism and Nazism. Critics argue that the term "white nationalism" is simply a "rebranding", and ideas such as white pride exist solely to provide a sanitized public face for white supremacy, which white nationalists allegedly avoid using because of its negative connotations, and that most white nationalist groups promote racial violence.

== See also ==
- Anti-immigration
- Black separatism
- Ethnic nationalism
- Pan-nationalism
- Separatism
- White separatism
- White Unity

== Sources ==
- Turda, Marius; Weindling, Paul J., eds. (2007). Blood and Homeland: Eugenics and Racial Nationalism in Central and Southeast Europe, 1900–1940. Budapest: Central European University Press. ISBN 9789637326813.
