= Gukppong =

Korean slur for South Korean nationalists

- Hangul: 국뽕
- Hanja: 國뽕
- RR: gukppong
- MR: kukppong

Gukppong (Korean: 국뽕) is a derogatory Korean word that is used to pejoratively describe a South Korean nationalist (or Korean state nationalist). The word is often used to call out nationalists who are overly patriotic and attract negative attention towards Korea.

== Etymology ==
The word is made up of the Korean word guk (국), which means country or state, and ppong (뽕) which is believed to have originated from the word philopon (覚醒剤), which is a Japanese slang for the drug methamphetamine. As a result, the word literally means "intoxicated with nationalism".

== History ==
The term was first used in DC Inside, a South Korean imageboard. Ultranationalists would excessively ask foreigners questions about Korean culture. For example, "Do you know Psy?" or "Do you know kimchi?" Many users believed that these actions were excessive and—rather ironically—humiliating to Korea. So, in means of insulting the ultranationalists, users developed the word, "guk-ppong," and began replying to nationalist posts, such as the ones mentioned above, with the word.

Shortly after guk-ppong's creation, the term ''guk-kka'' (국까) also began to appear. The word is the exact opposite of guk-ppong and is used to describe Koreans who are unproud of or disloyal to South Korea. Guk-kkas are known for their frequent posting of the phrase, 'Ddong song hap ni da' (똥송합니다), which roughly transliterates to "I am sorry that I am Asian." Similarly to 'guk-ppong', DC Inside's users began replying to anti-Korean posts with 'guk-kka'.

== Criticism ==
Some make the critique that excessive nationalism is causing excessive attention, often negatively. Also in the golden age of history, some point out that the desire for great ancient history is blatant without distinct of conservatism and progressivism, ruling party and opposition party. Because the reality surrounding us is so hot, everyone is going to leave the country in history. Song Joong-ki said, "Actually, I don't think the meaning of the word Guk-ppong is accurately established. Many people were confused with the words of appealing to pity. Don't blindly follow what is unrighteous, but I don't know why they shouldn't love South Korea. I think it could be connected to that. If I get the right criticism, I'll be able to talk, but I'm not afraid if I have right thinking."

== See also ==
- Cultural nationalism / Patriotism
- Korean Wave (K-pop)
- Voluntary Agency Network of Korea
