= Literary fiction =

Non-genre fiction

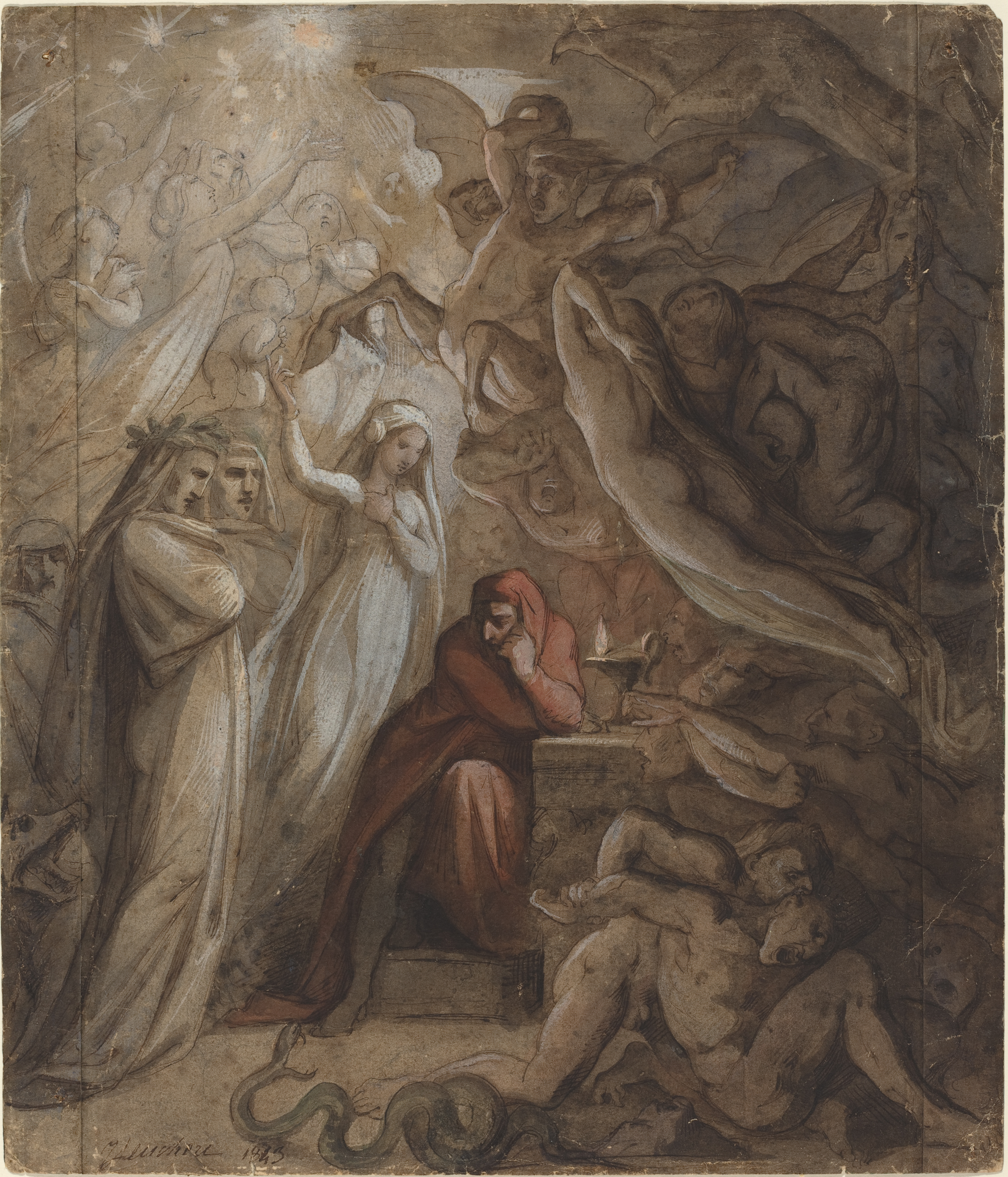
Dante Meditating on the Divine Comedy. Jean-Jacques Feuchère, 1843.

Literary fiction—also called serious fiction, high literature, artistic literature, or sometimes just literature—encompasses fiction that is more character-driven than plot-driven, examines the human condition, or is considered 'serious art' by critics. These labels are typically used in contrast to genre fiction, which refers to books that fit into established categories of the book trade and place more value on entertainment and appealing to a mass audience. Literary fiction can also be called non-genre fiction and is often considered by fans and critics of literary fiction to have more artistic merit than genre fiction.

Some categories of literary fiction, such as historical fiction, magic realism, autobiographical novels, and encyclopedic novels, are frequently called genres without being considered genre fiction. Some authors are seen as writing literary equivalents or precursors to established genres while still maintaining the division between commercial and literary fiction. Examples include the literary romance of Jane Austen and the speculative fiction of Margaret Atwood. Some critics and genre authors have argued for even greater overlap between literary and commercial fiction, noting that major literary figures have used elements of popular genres—such as science fiction, crime fiction, and romance—to create works they refer to as 'literature'. The slipstream genre is sometimes described as falling between genre fiction and non-genre fiction.

== Characteristics ==
=== Definition ===
Literary fiction lacks a well-established and widely agreed-upon definition, in part because it is heavily shaped by socio-cultural norms regarding what types of literature should be considered most noteworthy, respectable or serious. It may involve a concern with social commentary, political criticism, or reflection on the human condition. Some would argue that this contrasts with genre fiction, where plot is allegedly the central concern, although numerous works of genre fiction also contain these same elements. Some would argue literary fiction has a slower pace than popular fiction. As Terrence Rafferty notes, "Literary fiction, by its nature, allows itself to dawdle, to linger on stray beauties even at the risk of losing its way." Other works may be more concerned with style and the complexity of the writing. Saricks describes literary fiction as "elegantly written, lyrical, and ... layered". The quality and style of a work's prose is arguably a defining characteristic of literary fiction.

Fans of literary fiction will sometimes argue that it refers to realistic fiction focused on human character, although neither of those traits is uncommon in genre fiction. Jeff Prucher defined 'mainstream literature' as "realistic literature... that does not belong to a marketing category (especially science fiction, fantasy or horror)".

James Gunn also noted the difference between commercial and literary mainstreams, with the former referring to authors whose works are popular bestsellers, and the latter to works seen as "art". He also noted a contradiction between the two categories, as "high sales figures are generally taken to mean the author has sold out" and has therefore left the literary mainstream. He further defined the literary mainstream as "dominated by the academic-literary community—university professors of literature; high-powered critics for prestige publications such as the New York Times Book Review, The New York Review of Books, and The New Yorker: and writers who take the first two groups seriously". According to Gunn, the field of literary fiction in the United States is significantly shaped by early 20th-century fiction and by the classic canon formed from works by authors such as Virginia Woolf, James Joyce, and Henry James.

=== Classic literature ===
Literary fiction includes classic books, which are works in any discipline that have been accepted as exemplary or noteworthy. This includes those listed in a list of great books.

==== Europe ====
In English literary studies, the terms "classic book" and "Western canon" are closely related but not synonymous. A canon refers to a list of books considered "essential" and can be presented in various ways. It may appear as a published collection, such as Great Books of the Western World, Modern Library, or Penguin Classics, as a list compiled by an academic such as Harold Bloom, or as an official reading list of a higher-education institution.

Robert M. Hutchins in his 1952 preface to the Great Books of the Western World declared:

Until lately the West has regarded it as self-evident that the road to education lay through great books. No man was educated unless he was acquainted with the masterpieces of his tradition. There never was very much doubt in anybody's mind about which the masterpieces were. They were the books that had endured and that the common voice of mankind called the finest creations, in writing, of the Western mind.

Ben Bova, commenting on the distinction between genre and non-genre works, argued that "the literature of the fantastic was the mainstream of world storytelling from the time writing began until the beginning of the seventeenth century," and that older classics have more in common with modern fantastical genre works than with contemporary literary mainstream fiction.

==== China ====
The Classic Chinese Novels are works of fiction noted for their immense impact on Chinese culture and literature.

=== High culture ===
Literary fiction can be considered an example of "high culture" and contrasted with "popular culture" and "mass culture".

The poet and critic Matthew Arnold defined "culture" in Culture and Anarchy (1869), as "the disinterested endeavor after man's perfection," pursued and achieved through the effort to "know the best that has been said and thought in the world." This literary conception of high culture also includes philosophy. The philosophy of aesthetics has proposed high culture as a force for moral and political good.

=== Literary merit ===
Since 1901, the Nobel Prize in Literature has often been awarded to authors of literary fiction. This annual award is presented to a writer from any country who has, in the field of literature, produced the most outstanding work in an idealistic direction. Although individual works are sometimes cited as particularly noteworthy, the award is based on an author's entire body of work.

The International Booker Prize is a similar British award given for outstanding literary fiction translated into English. This complements the original Booker Prize, which is awarded to fiction written in English. For both prizes, judges are selected from leading literary critics, writers, academics, and public figures. The Booker judging process, and the very concept of a "best book" being chosen by a small number of literary insiders, is controversial for many. Author Amit Chaudhuri wrote: "The idea that a 'book of the year' can be assessed annually by a bunch of people – judges who have to read almost a book a day – is absurd, as is the idea that this is any way of honoring a writer."

== Reactions ==
In an interview, John Updike lamented that "the category of 'literary fiction' has sprung up recently to torment people like me who just set out to write books, and if anybody wanted to read them, terrific, the more the merrier ... I'm a genre writer of a sort. I write literary fiction, which is like spy fiction or chick lit." Likewise, on The Charlie Rose Show, Updike argued that the term, when applied to his work, greatly limited him and his expectations of what might come of his writing, so he did not really like it. He suggested that all his works are literary simply because "they are written in words."

James Gunn noted that genre fans and critics criticize mainstream literary fiction as mundane, citing the term's "deliberate overtones of dullness, worldliness, and uninspired realism". He criticized mainstream literary fiction as becoming increasingly stagnant and marginalized. This view has been echoed by others. For example, British science fiction and fantasy writer Adam Roberts commented, "It's not that SFF [science fiction and fantasy] is a ghetto inside the glorious city of 'Literary Fiction', but the reverse. 'Literary' novels sell abominably badly, by and large; popular culture in the main belongs to SF and Fantasy, eighteen of the top twenty highest-grossing movies of all time are SFF, [and] everybody recognizes SFF icons and memes."

In the context of science fiction, Brian Stableford defined literary fiction as "a tradition that had been and remained stubbornly indifferent to, if not proudly ignorant of, the progress of science." Gunn wrote, "The SF community uses the word mainstream to describe the fiction that is getting the attention they want; the word is a confession that SF is felt to be a side-stream, a tributary."

Critics and readers of mainstream literary fiction have sometimes been accused of "snobbery" for their dislike of genre fiction.

== See also ==
- Aesthetic judgment
- Literary criticism
- Literary genre
- Literary theory
- A Reader's Manifesto
- Pop culture fiction – literature involving popular culture references and crossovers
- Postmodern literature
- The Great American Novel
- Speculative fiction
- Absurdist fiction

== Bibliography ==
- Coles, William (2009). Literary Story As an Art Form: A Text for Writers. AuthorHouse. p. 136.
- Delany, Samuel (2009). Freedman, Carl (ed.). Conversations With Samuel R. Delany. Literary Conversations Series. University Press of Mississippi. pp. 214.
- Habjan, Jernej; Imlinger, Fabienne (2015). Globalizing Literary Genres: Literature, History, Modernity. London: Routledge.
- Rafferty, Terrence (February 4, 2011). "Reluctant Seer". The New York Times Sunday Book Review.
- Saricks, Joyce (2009). The Readers' Advisory Guide to Genre Fiction (2nd ed.). ALA Editions. p. 402.
- Saricks, Joyce (2005). Readers' Advisory Service In The Public Library (3rd ed.). ALA Editions. p. 211.
