= Pledge of Allegiance (South Korea) =

Pledge to the national flag of South Korea

The South Korean flag, also known as the Taegeukgi (lit. 'supreme ultimate flag').

The Pledge of Allegiance to the Flag (Korean: 국기에 대한 맹세; Hanja: 國旗에 對한 盟誓; lit. 'oath facing the national flag') is the pledge to the national flag of South Korea. It is recited during the national ceremony (gungmin uirye) held at official events. The pledge was first written and distributed in March 1968 by the Board of Education of South Chungcheong Province, and at the end of 1968 the Ministry of Education extended it to the whole country. In May 2007, the Ministry of Government Administration and Home Affairs found that the existing wording no longer suited the times and was grammatically incorrect, and it finalized a revised text that was promulgated and took effect on July 27, 2007.

== History ==
- March 1968 – Yu Jong-seon, chief school inspector at the South Chungcheong Province Office of Education, writes the pledge.
- 1968 – The Ministry of Education instructs schools across the country to adopt it.
- 1972 – By order of the Prime Minister, the pledge is recited together with the salute to the flag. This version is associated with the government of then-president Park Chung Hee.
- February 1984 – The Regulations on the Flag of the Republic of Korea are enacted by presidential decree.
- July 27, 2007 – The current pledge takes effect.

== Saluting the flag ==
The Enforcement Decree of the Act on the Flag of the Republic of Korea (Article 3) sets out how to salute the flag:

1. People not in uniform face the flag, place their open right hand on the left side of their chest and look at the flag.
2. People not in uniform who are wearing a hat face the flag, remove the hat with their right hand, hold it against the left side of their chest and look at the flag. If it is difficult to remove the hat, they may follow the first method.
3. People in uniform, such as members of the armed forces and the police, face the flag and give a hand salute.

Article 6 of the Act on the Flag of the Republic of Korea states that a person saluting the flag stands facing it and either places the open right hand on the left side of the chest while looking at the flag, or gives a hand salute. Other details of the method and procedure are set by presidential decree.

=== Origin of the hand-on-chest salute ===
For some time after liberation in 1945, people showed respect to the flag by bowing from the waist, as had been done under Japanese rule. Local Christian churches regarded this as a form of idolatry, and in 1949 dozens of pupils at Bongilcheon Elementary School in Paju, Gyeonggi Province, were expelled for refusing to bow to the flag. The matter became a national issue, and Christian representatives visited President Syngman Rhee to ask for a change. As a result, the State Council abolished the bow and replaced it with the present practice of placing the right hand over the heart and looking at the flag.

== Text of the pledge ==
=== 1968 version ===
Korean
나는 자랑스런 태극기 앞에 조국의 통일과 번영을 위하여 정의와 진실로서 충성을 다할 것을 다짐합니다.
English translation
Before the proud Taegeukgi, I pledge to give my full loyalty, with justice and truth, to the unification and prosperity of the fatherland.

=== 1972 version ===
Korean
나는 자랑스런 태극기 앞에 조국과 민족의 무궁한 영광을 위하여 몸과 마음을 바쳐 충성을 다할 것을 굳게 다짐합니다.
Romanization
Naneun jarangseureon taegeukgi ape jogukgwa minjogui mugunghan yeonggwangeul wihayeo momgwa maeumeul bachyeo chungseongeul dahal geoseul gutge dajimhamnida.
English translation
Before the proud Taegeukgi, I firmly pledge to give my full loyalty, devoting my body and mind, to the eternal glory of the fatherland and the nation (minjok).

"The unification and prosperity of the fatherland" in the first version became "the eternal glory of the fatherland and the nation", and "with justice and truth" became "devoting my body and mind". This text was in official use until July 26, 2007.

=== 2007 version (current) ===
Korean
나는 자랑스러운 태극기 앞에 자유롭고 정의로운 대한민국의 무궁한 영광을 위하여 충성을 다할 것을 굳게 다짐합니다.
Romanization
Naneun jarangseureoun taegeukgi ape jayuropgo jeonguiroun daehanmingugui mugunghan yeonggwangeul wihayeo chungseongeul dahal geoseul gutge dajimhamnida.
English translation
Before the proud Taegeukgi, I firmly pledge to give my full loyalty to the eternal glory of the free and just Republic of Korea.

The revision, the first in 35 years, made three changes. The word 자랑스런 (jarangseureon, "proud") was corrected to the grammatically standard 자랑스러운 (jarangseureoun). "The fatherland and the nation" was replaced with "the free and just Republic of Korea" to reflect the times. The phrase "devoting my body and mind" was removed.

In primary and secondary schools the new text was not adopted immediately. During a nationwide guidance period from the second semester of 2007 to the first semester of 2008, the old and new pledges were used side by side, and the new pledge fully replaced the old one in schools only around late 2008 to early 2009.

== Legal basis ==
The pledge is prescribed in Article 4 of the Enforcement Decree of the Act on the Flag of the Republic of Korea.

== Controversy ==
In May 2003, National Assembly member Rhyu Si-min said that the pledge was a remnant of fascism, which set off a public debate. Others have argued that compelling people to recite the pledge is unconstitutional because it infringes the freedom of conscience guaranteed by the Constitution.

Unlike the current pledge, which pledges allegiance to the state of South Korea, the 1972 pledge was made to the "Korean nation" or "Korean ethnicity" (minjok), which some critics such as Brian Reynolds Myers translate as "Korean race". That wording was dropped in July 2007, during the presidency of Roh Moo-hyun. Similarly, until April 2011, South Korean soldiers swore allegiance to the "Korean minjok" in their oath of enlistment, which was then changed for similar reasons.

== See also ==
- Flag of South Korea
- Korean ethnic nationalism
- Pledge of Allegiance (United States)
- Oath of Imperial Subjects (Korea under Japanese rule)
- Oath of allegiance
