= The Cleanest Race =

2010 book by Brian Reynolds Myers

The Cleanest Race: How North Koreans See Themselves—and Why It Matters
- Cover
- Author: B. R. Myers
- Language: English
- Subject: North Korean history and propaganda
- Publisher: Melville House Publishing
- Publication date: 2010
- Publication place: United States
- Media type: Print
- Pages: 169
- ISBN: 1933633913

The Cleanest Race: How North Koreans See Themselves and Why it Matters is a 2010 book by Brian Reynolds Myers. Based on a study of the propaganda produced in North Korea for internal consumption, Myers argues that the guiding ideology of North Korea is a combination of far-right Japanese fascism rooted in State Shinto and race-based nationalism derived from minzoku (民族), rather than Stalinism or any other form of far-left communism. The book is based on author's study of the material in the Information Center on North Korea.

== Author ==
Brian Reynolds Myers was born in the U.S. and was educated on the graduate level in Germany. He is an editor of The Atlantic magazine and the author of A Reader's Manifesto, as well as of Han Sorya and North Korea Literature (1994), which was the only book in English about North Korean literature until Tatiana Gabroussenko's literary history Soldiers on the Cultural Front (2010). Myers has studied North Korea for twenty years and is fluent in Korean. He holds an assistant professorship in international studies at Dongseo University in South Korea.

For the book, Myers studied North Korean mass culture with reference to domestically published novels, films, and serials available at the Ministry of Unification in Seoul. Myers claims his analysis differs from that of conventional North Korea watchers, because he focuses on internal Korean-language propaganda, rather than on Korean Central News Agency (KCNA) external broadcasts and English-language reports from South Korea.

== Contents ==
The Cleanest Race is divided into two sections: the first covers North Korean history through its propaganda, from Korea under Japanese rule to the 2009 imprisonment of American journalists by North Korea. The second section analyzes themes in the propaganda, including chapters such as "Mother Korea", Kim Il Sung, Kim Jong Il, perceptions of foreigners, and South Korea.

Techniques of propaganda analysis by Myers include translation of poems, discussion of metaphors and monumental architecture, and description of racist tropes. The book also contains sixteen separate pages of color illustrations, including reprints of posters that ethnically caricature Japanese and White Americans and which portray the late leaders Kim Il Sung and Kim Jong Il as paternal figures.

=== Racial identity ===
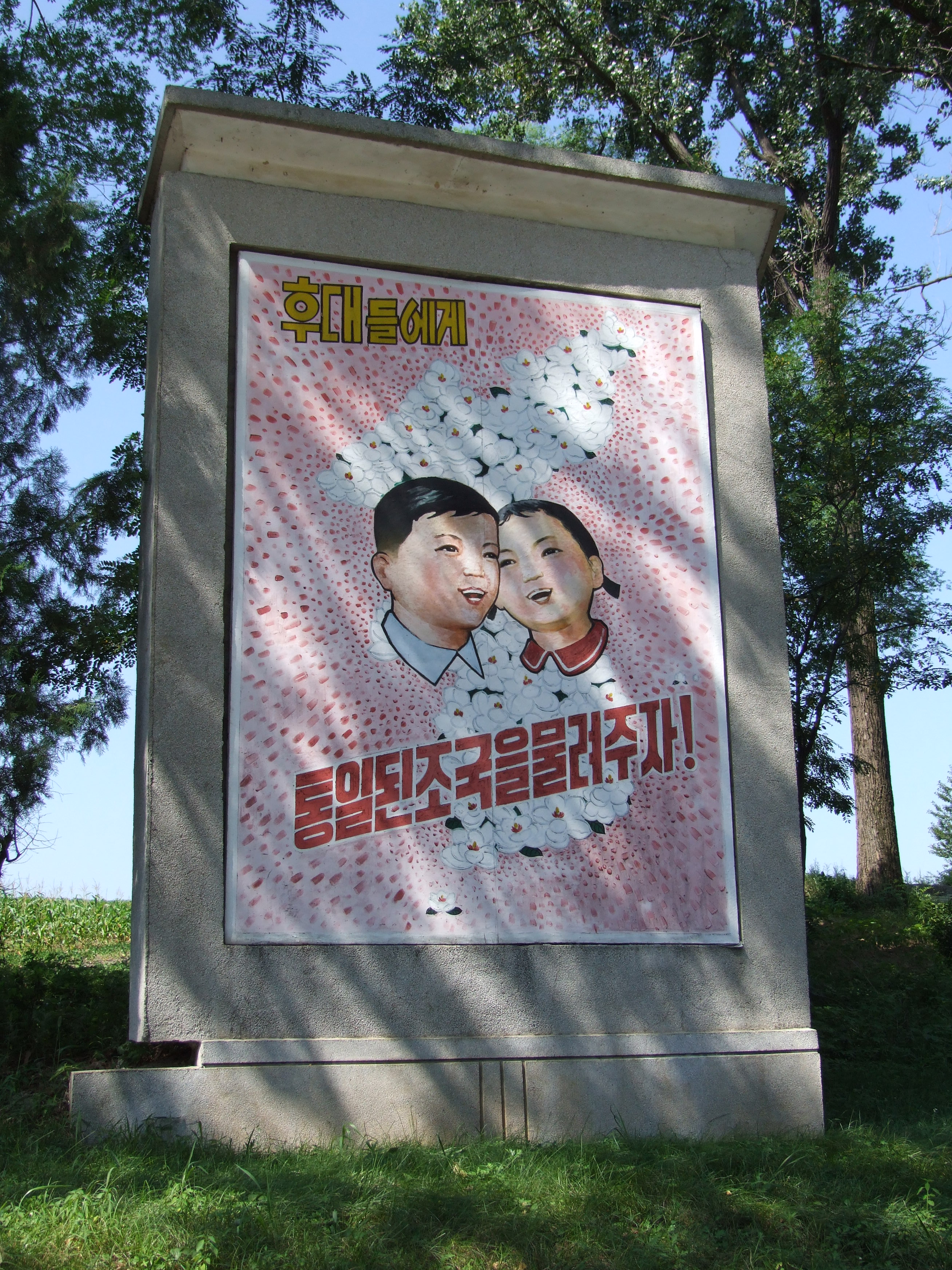
Pro-unification propaganda on the Korean Demilitarized Zone

The Cleanest Race argues that the overarching ideology of the North Korean government is founded on far-right politics rather than far-left politics. It notes that the North Korean government is racist, xenophobic, and militaristic. It cites a report of a mob attack on Afro-Cuban diplomats and the forcing of female Koreans to abort multi-ethnic children. It mentions that the 2009 North Korean constitution omits all mention of communism. The author argues that Juche is not the leading ideology of North Korea. Rather, he surmises, it was designed in order to trick foreigners.

Myers says North Korea's government does not base its ideology on Marxism–Leninism or Neo-Confucianism. He instead links it to Japanese state nationalism and racial nationalism. He states that the government's racist criteria for national identity paints its genetically Korean citizens as innocent and morally virtuous (as opposed to foreigners) but militarily weak, requiring Kim Il Sung's charismatic guidance and protection. The author supposes that this may be a strategy by the government to decrease the amount of repression and surveillance needed to control that public.

=== Implications for the North Korean government's foreign policy ===
According to Myers, the North Korean government's propaganda portrays South Korea as a land which has been polluted by foreign domination, particularly by the permanent presence of U.S. soldiers. Anti-Americanism is the cornerstone of North Korean foreign policy.

Similarly, internal propaganda within North Korea portrays U.S. humanitarian efforts such as food aid as signs of U.S. cowardice and makes no distinction "between 'good' American workers and 'bad' American capitalists" as the Soviet Union's regime in the Cold War did. He laments that North Koreans openly flout the "dictates of an impure world" as inapplicable to the pure Korean race.

== Reception ==
=== Press reviews ===
Upon its release, The Cleanest Race received a significant amount of attention from the media and it also received "rave reviews" in the United States press. The journalist Christopher Hitchens (who had visited North Korea at the beginning of the 21st century) recounted that after he read the book, he concluded that his earlier belief that the country was Stalinist was simplistic and incorrect. Some reviewers confirmed anecdotal instances of North Korean Xenophobia and alarm due to the high rate of interracial marriage in South Korea. Hitchens also found some "obscene corollaries" from Myers' conclusions, including the observation that many South Koreans believe that the North Korean regime is more "'authentically' Korean" than their own government.

The New York Times characterized the book as "often counterintuitive" and its arguments as "wily and complex". Bradley K. Martin of The New Republic, however, warned that the book could "[play down] the Stalinist, Maoist, and traditional East Asian contributions" to North Korean ideology. Martin argues that North Korean ideology can be understood in the terms of Japanese pre-fascist psychology, including amae (dependence on parents) and banzai (wishing long life for the ruler).

=== Academic reception ===
==== Journals ====
Charles K. Armstrong in The Journal of Asian Studies states that the conclusions of the book are "not news". He explains that historian Bruce Cumings, who Myers excoriates, addresses the influence of "Japanese colonial militarism" on North Korea. Armstrong faults Myers for exaggerating the Japanese angle and he also suggests that the North Korean government is "actually closer to European fascism" rather than Imperial Japanese fascism, because Imperial Japan lacked a charismatic leader and it also lacked a mass-mobilizing party.

Alzo David-West in Journal of Contemporary Asia claims Myers writes "in the tradition of 'axis of evil' cultural criticism", obscures the differences between Nazism and Stalinism, and overlooks the historical influence of Maoism in North Korea. He also says Myers does not cite the relevant North Korean studies scholarship of Han S. Park, most notably North Korea: The Politics of Unconventional Wisdom (2002); makes scarce treatment of the Songun military-first ideology; and claims Juche ideology is universalist-humanist rather than ethnic nationalist.

Gerd Jendraschek in Studies on Asia says that Myers "downplays synchronic and diachronic variation"; he "does not explain"; he "ignores counter-evidence ... while exaggerating"; he "contradicts himself"; and he is "anecdotal ... biased and speculative".

Suzy Kim in Critical Asian Studies explains that Myers reads North Korea through an "infantilizing Orientalist gaze"; he "lack[s] ... understanding of ... Confucian relations", "denies Confucian influence" and "chooses to ignore North Korean kinship metaphors"; he has "his own preconceptions"; he "conflat[es] North Korean solipsism and nationalism with racism" and "whitewash[es] American racism and Orientalism"; he "never interrogates ... representations and lived realities"; he "never contextualizes the different kinds of sources he is using" but "lumps together" a "Text" that "becomes a straw man ... to serve his own arguments"; and he "takes at face value" the "simple dichotomy between 'Koreans' and 'foreigners'."

Craig MacKie in The Political Economy of Affect in East Asia says, "Myers' formulation of the 'child race' is deeply problematic as a result of the instrumental way he uses it in his text" even though the "work does correctly register ... filial and familial themes and the fixation on the dead father that characterizes propaganda in North Korea."

==== Magazines ====
Andrei Lankov in Far Eastern Economic Review states Myers takes a "fresh approach" to North Korea. Lankov also says Myers' work is "informative" but is not sure whether his thesis has any relation to reality.

=== Other ===
Felix Abt, a business affairs specialist who lived in North Korea for seven years, observes that Myers's book is "flawed"; makes "shaky", "absurd", and "questionable" claims; and takes North Korean "propaganda more seriously than North Koreans do themselves."

== Published in Korean language ==
In 2011, The Cleanest Race (Korean: 가장 깨끗한 민족) was translated into Korean language in South Korea and published. However, the title of the translation has been changed to suit the local sentiment: Why North Korea is a far-right country (Korean: 왜 북한은 극우의 나라인가); Myers translates minjok (Korean: 민족) as 'race' rather than 'nation' or 'ethnic group', which is controversial among some scholars and South Koreans.

== See also ==
- Fascism in Asia
- History of North Korea
- Human rights in North Korea
- Politics of North Korea
- Propaganda in North Korea
- Racism in North Korea
