= Emperor-system fascism =

Japanese historiographical perspective

Emperor-system fascism (天皇制ファシズム, Tennōsei fashizumu) or Japanese fascism (日本型ファシズム, Nihongata fashizumu; lit. "Japanese-style fascism") is the view that ultranationalistic politics, society, and ideas based on the Empire of Japan's "Emperor system" were a kind of fascism until the end of World War II in Asia. Rather than an ideology openly espoused by the Japanese themselves, Emperor-system fascism is a retrospective concept developed primarily by Japanese Marxist historians to describe how Japanese fascism was distinct from European fascism. While Japan exhibited fascist characteristics such as totalitarianism, militarism, and ultranationalism, it relied on the divine authority of the Emperor and the existing establishment, rather than a revolution.

== Overview ==
The New Order Movement was influenced by Italian fascism and Nazism that led to the "statist" Imperial Rule Assistance Association.

Kinzō Gorai toured Italy, France, Germany, United Kingdom, and Soviet Union in 1931 and delivered a lecture entitled "Fascism or Communism?" (ファッショか共産主義か, Fassho ka kyōsanshugi ka) in 1932, the transcript of which was published in 1933. In this lecture, he cited the failure of Soviet communism, i.e., the selfishness of the classless, and the rise of fascio (unity) in United Kingdom, Italy, and Germany, saying, "it can be said that fascio is the suppression of class selfishness, the unification of national economies, and the harmonization of classes.", "In Europe, the selfishness of the proletarian class, that is, the power of the workers and the proletarian class has grown so strong since the World War that it has finally reached a dead end, devouring capital. The reactionary response to this is today's fascio movement. In this sense, the fascio movement is advocating a people-oriented politics, that is, totalitarianism, as opposed to class selfishness.", and "We see in Russia the fact that the interests of one class alone can lead to national deprivation, and that the working class itself can finally become destitute of food and clothing."

After the May 15 Incident in 1932, Emperor Shōwa expressed his request to Gen. Saionji Kinmochi, who was recommending a successor to Prime Minister Inukai Tsuyoshi, that "anyone close to the fascist is absolutely impossible."

In October 1932, Ogasawara Naganari stated the following in his book History of Assassinations in the Shōwa era (昭和大暗殺史, Shōwa daiansatsushi): "In each country, fascism must arise in accordance with the national conditions of each country. In other words, in our country, a Japanized fascism will be born. ... The world's celebrated fascism must be fabricated by Japan's Bushido."

In 1946, in The Logic and Psychology of Ultranationalism (超国家主義の論理と心理, Chōkokkashugi no ronri to shinri), Masao Maruyama defined "fascism" as "the most radical and most militant form of counterrevolution", and stated that Italian fascism and Nazism was "fascism from below" by mass movements under parliamentary society, while Japanese fascism was "fascism from above" by the military and bureaucracy. This "theory of Japanese fascism" was widely influential, especially from the 1940s to the 1970s, when many similar or related views appeared.

=== Developmental periods of the fascism in Japan according to Maruyama ===
- First stage is the preparatory period, which is the period from the end of the World War I to around the time of the Manchurian Incident, which can be called the "era of the right-wing movement in the private sector" and dates from 1919/1920 to 1931.
- Second stage is the period from around the Manchurian Incident to the February 26 incident, a stage and process in which the movement of the first stage colluded with some of the military forces, became the driving force of the fascist movement, and gradually came to occupy a central role in national politics. It was also the period when the March Incident, Kinki Incident, League of Blood Incident, May 15 Incident, God soldier incident, Military Academy Incident, Aizawa Incident, and the Nijujiroku Incident broke out one after another. In chronological terms, the period runs from around 1931 to 1936.
- Third period was the period of the completion of Japanese fascism, when the military, as the overt leader from above, created an inadequate but allied system of rule between the semi-feudal forces of the bureaucracy, overlords, and the monopoly capital and bourgeois parties. In chronological terms, it is the period from the period of the military purge after the February 26 incident in 1936 to the surrender of Japan in 1945.

== Views ==
Masao Maruyama first attracted attention from the scholarly community immediately following the war with his famous essay on wartime Japanese fascism, The Logic and Psychology of Ultranationalism, first published in the widely-read journal Sekai in 1946; the term "Emperor-system fascism" was used in essay. Analysis of Japanese Empire as an "Emperor-system fascism" occupied a significant position in academia until the 1970s, but since the 1980s, objections have continued.

As of 21st century, the views of modern Japanese historians and political scientists are generally negative on whether the Japanese society and system up to the end of World War II could be considered "Emperor-system fascism" or "Japanese fascism". In the case of Japan, the prevailing view is that it was at best a “wartime regime” or militarism, and that fascism as a political system was never established.

The view of some Japanese studies scholars in Western countries is that fascism was not established in Japan. American historian Robert Paxton argues that with the absence of a mass revolutionary party and a rupture from the incumbent regime, Imperial Japan was merely "an expansionist military dictatorship with a high degree of state-sponsored mobilization [rather] than as a fascist regime"; British historian Roger Griffin, called Putin's Russia and World War II-era Japan "emulated fascism in many ways, but was not fascist".

However, many other Western scholars instead acknowledge Japanese fascism as the ruling ideology of Japan during that era; Reto Hofmann have emphasized the differences between Japanese forms of fascism and European forms of fascism, linking it primarily to the distinctive characteristics of Japanese statehood, the imperial tradition, and the concept of kokutai. Emperor-system fascism was generally characterized by stronger state-nationalist (国家主義; Kokkashugi) rather than ethno-nationalist (民族主義; Minzokushugi) elements, and was positioned as closer to 'para-fascism' than 'pure fascism'.

However, there were also ethno-nationalist elements more akin to pure fascism during the late 1930s and early 1940s, which include twice-failed coup participant Kingoro Hashimoto (who proposed a single-party dictatorship based on populism, patterned after European fascist movements) and the 1943 secret ethnic-centered expansionist Japanese government report, An Investigation of Global Policy with the Yamato Race as Nucleus (which was never official doctrine and which had little actual impact on Japanese policy).

== Alleged Influence on Juche ==
Brian Reynolds Myers, based on a study of the propaganda produced in North Korea for internal consumption, argues in The Cleanest Race that the guiding ideology of North Korea is a combination of state-based Japanese fascism and race-based nationalism derived from minzoku (民族), rather than Stalinism or any other form of communism. However, Charles K. Armstrong in The Journal of Asian Studies suggests that North Korea is "actually closer to European fascism" than to Imperial Japanese fascism.

== See also ==
- Fascism in Asia § Japan
- February 26 incident
- Imperial Way Faction
- Japanese militarism
- Kenkokukai
- Kokumin Dōmei
- Kokutairon and Pure Socialism – Ikki Kita's book
- Tōhōkai
- Reform bureaucrats
- Ultranationalism (Japan)
