= A Reader's Manifesto =

2002 book by B. R. Myers

A Reader's Manifesto: An Attack on the Growing Pretentiousness in American Literary Prose
- First edition cover of the expanded essay.
- Author: Brian Reynolds Myers
- Language: English
- Genre: Literary criticism
- Publisher: Melville House Publishing
- Publication date: 2002
- Publication place: United States
- Media type: Print (paperback)
- Pages: 149 (including endnotes)
- ISBN: 0-9718659-0-6
- OCLC: 50243166
- Dewey Decimal: 818/.08 21
- LC Class: PS362 .M94 2002

A Reader's Manifesto is a 2002 book by B. R. Myers expanded from his essay in the July/August 2001 issue of The Atlantic Monthly magazine. Myers criticized what he saw as the growing pretentiousness of contemporary American literary fiction, especially in contrast to genre fiction.

== Contents ==
Myers described the original article as "a light-hearted polemic" about modern literature. Myers was particularly concerned with what he saw as the growing pretentiousness of American literary fiction. He was skeptical about the value showcased by elaborate, allusive prose works and argued that what was praised as good writing was in fact the epitome of bad writing.

His critique concentrated on Annie Proulx, Cormac McCarthy, Paul Auster, David Guterson, and Don DeLillo, all of whom enjoyed substantial acclaim from the literary establishment. Myers directed many of his harshest charges at literary critics for prestigious publications such as The New York Times Book Review, whom he accused of lavishing praise upon bad writing either for political reasons, or because they did not understand it and therefore assumed it to have great artistic merit. Myers also focuses on what he calls "the cult of the sentence", criticizing critics for pulling single sentences out of novels in order to praise their brilliance, while ignoring shortcomings in the novel as a whole.

=== Author critiques ===
Myers explains and critiques several prose styles, each focused on a specific author.

==== Annie Proulx ====
Myers accuses Annie Proulx of using nonsensical images, mixed metaphors, and poor word choice. Myers claims Proulx writes to "startle or impress the reader", asserting that this sort of writing must be read quickly so the meaning of the sentences does not fall apart. "With good Mandarin prose the opposite is true," Myers says, comparing Proulx's writing unfavorably with that of James Joyce and Virginia Woolf. Myers criticizes Proulx for being "too egocentric" to put herself in the place of her characters when deciding what is important and what is unnecessary. He also mentions that Proulx writes one thing but means something else, implying Proulx has a lack of polish. Myers writes, "Someone needs to tell her that half of good writing is knowing what to leave out".

==== Don DeLillo ====
Meyers accuses Don DeLillo of lacking in the "edginess" that critics praise him for, since DeLillo writes on themes of anti-consumerism, a topic that has been explored in literature since the 1950s. Myers asserts that DeLillo's characters serve primarily as vessels for DeLillo's thoughts, rather than as discrete characters. DeLillo, according to Myers, attempts to persuade his readers that if something does not make sense it is "over their heads," or that "something as inadequate as language can never do justice to the complexity of what they're trying to say." Myers also points out that DeLillo uses a slippery sense of irony in his writing, "As so often with DeLillo's musings, the 'conclusion' is phrased as a rhetorical question. 'If this works for you, take it,' he is saying, 'but if you think it's silly, hey—maybe I do too.'"

==== Cormac McCarthy ====
Myers accuses Cormac McCarthy of filling his sentences with bulky words that contain no real detail or meaning. He uses the following as an example, from The Crossing:

"He ate the last of the eggs and wiped the plate with the tortilla and ate the tortilla and drank the last of the coffee and wiped his mouth and looked up and thanked her."

Myers writes:

"This is a good example of what I call the andelope: a breathless string of simple declarative statements linked by the conjunction 'and'. Like the 'evocative' slide-show and the Consumerland shopping-list, the andelope encourages skim-reading while keeping up the appearance of 'literary' length and complexity. But like the slide-show (and unlike the shopping-list), the andelope often clashes with the subject matter, and the unpunctuated flow of words bears no relation to the methodical meal that is being described."

McCarthy's prose, Myers quips, "is unspeakable in every sense of the word," implying that it is both awful and frequently difficult to imagine a person saying. McCarthy's use of archaisms is also brought under scrutiny.

==== Paul Auster ====
Myers suggests that Paul Auster over-describes situations, especially mentioning numerous details that are particularly mundane and obvious. By making a description too long, as Auster does, Myers says that an author encourages a reader to "feel emboldened to ask why it needed to be said at all." Myers accuses Auster of "simply wasting our time" with his wordiness. Myers states that dragging on a point too long might cause it to go stale, as it did in Auster's passage from Timbuktu. With an example from Auster's Moon Palace, Myers describes how too many big and fancy words, used incorrectly, can discredit the speaker's intelligence. Myers also criticizes Auster for saying the same thing too many times. He states, "Swing the hammer often enough, and you're bound to hit the nail on the head sometime—or so Auster seems to think."

==== David Guterson ====
Myers critiques David Guterson's novel Snow Falling on Cedars mainly for its "sluggishness" of words and "echoic" thought process. Myers concludes that Snow Falling on Cedars is no more than "flat, stereotypical descriptions" of characters in a given context, and, were its pace not slow, it would be considered a genre novel. Myers criticizes Guterson's average descriptions of predictable characters that have often been explored in literature and complains that Guterson brings nothing new to the characters or story.

==== Other critiques and recommendations ====
In addition to these critiques, Myers also criticizes Thomas Wolfe, Jay McInerney, and Rick Moody.

As examples of books with a style preferred by Myers, he lists, among others, To the Lighthouse, Those Barren Leaves, The Adventures of Augie March, The Victim, The Man Without Qualities, Le Père Goriot, Illusions perdues, La Comédie humaine, The Orchard Keeper (by previously criticized author Cormac McCarthy), Moby-Dick, Malone Dies, and Gormenghast.

=== Rebuttals to previous criticism ===
Myers devotes a section of the book-length text to describing the response the shorter version published in the Atlantic Monthly received upon its publication. This portion of the book is an analysis of the criticisms of his original critique, and while it is written with Myers' characteristic "humor", it is the place in the book where he most aggressively defends his views.

Myers' critics call him a philistine and an advocate for low-brow literature, and suggest that his criteria for good literature implicitly define it as writing that is simple enough to require little effort to read. Myers responds that books may also be difficult to read because of poor writing style, and he recommends other authors as examples of a complex style executed with skill.

Several critics claim the authors Myers featured were already discounted by the literary establishment. Myers was unable to find any evidence backing this claim, and responds to this argument with the absence of criticism for the authors and several examples of praise.

Critics suggest that the ambiguity Myers criticizes contains the value of the works: "consoling riddles", as one critic calls them. Myers rebuts, "Literature need not answer every question it raises, but questions themselves should be clear." "Difficult lucidity," in Myers' opinion, is what is missing from contemporary prose—the kind of writing that, as he says, "rewards the use of a dictionary instead of punishing it."

Myers responds to criticism that his complaints "evinced faulty judgment". Myers points out that the critics made no attempt to argue that the defamed excerpts deserved the praise originally lavished on them.

Some critics say that Myers is too harsh and negative in his reviews and that he looks at the substandard rather than the good sections of a literary work. Myers refutes these criticisms by stating that he uses the same excerpts that were previously praised by other critics. He also explains that some good parts do not qualify a work of literary prose as being worth the money and time it costs to purchase and read. Myers claims that the writer has become more important than the writing and any failings "only makes them more lovable" in the eyes of the modern critic.

Critics charge Myers with living in an "imagined past", in which all the authors were more talented. Myers agrees to a point, but gives the example of the National Book Award winners between 1990 and 2001 compared to those of 1950 through 1961 winners, stating, "Prize committees have always been unreliable judges of quality... still, it's worth noting that there was too much good writing around in the 1950s for even the prize committees to miss."

Myers' critics accuse him of putting too much emphasis on reality. Myers responds, "I love it when Bulgakov makes a cat talk, and when Gogol dresses a nose in a civil servant's uniform, and—if I may jerk the chain again—when Stephen King gives a car a mind of its own." He says that he instead, "points out how absurd it is for the narrator of DeLillo's The Names, the usual 'elliptical' windbag, to claim that lying about one's destination creates a grave disparity in the listener's brain between the real and the false destination. In making this point I was merely judging The Names—as I judge every novel—by its own standards, in this case as a novel of serious ideas. (DeLillo himself has said that it represents 'a deeper level of seriousness.')"

Myers received attacks on his history and character for his essay. For example, Judith Shulevitz criticized Myers for being a foreigner (he was an Army brat), unacquainted with the literary establishment he criticized. In response, Myers claimed that in these literary circles, social identity is more important than writing. Myers believes instead that a reader should trust his/her reason and intelligence to judge the writing, without necessarily being swayed by the "reputation" of the author.

=== List of rules ===
Myers provides a list of rules at the end of the book, an ironic set of guidelines for writing, corresponding to prose criticized earlier in the book. Myers implies that following the rules will lead to literary success. The listed rules are "Be Writerly", "Sprawl", "Equivocate", "Mystify", "Keep Sentences Long", "Repeat yourself", "Pile on the Imagery", "Archaize", "Bore", and "Play the part".

== Reception ==
Myers' article attracted criticism from aficionados of American literary fiction, including of the authors Myers mentioned by name. Some critics charged Myers with being selective in his choice of targets, and of cherry picking particularly unreadable passages from the authors' works to make his point, with his methods described as 'clever, efficient and unfair' by The New York Observer journalist Adam Begley. For many critics, Myers was continuing popular comments on postmodernism, of which John Gardner (On Moral Fiction) was the most recent proponent.

== See also ==
- Criticism of postmodernism
- 2001 in literature
- 2002 in literature
