= South Korean nationalism =

State nationalism in the Korean Peninsula

The flag of South Korea; The flag of Korea is seen by South Koreans as a representation of the Korean identity and historical legitimacy.

South Korean nationalism is a form of state nationalism particular to South Korea. In the 20th century, South Korean nationalism was hardly distinguishable from anti-communist Korean nationalism, but South Korean nationalism in the 21st century has relatively weakened the ethno-nationalism of "Korean minjok" (한민족; lit. 'Korean ethnicity') and the state identity of "Republic of Korea" (대한민국) is more prominent among the youth.

Among South Korean nationalists, opinions on Korean reunification are divided: some oppose reunification; others support anti-communist "absorption unification" (흡수통일) centered on the Republic of Korea.

South Korea is a highly homogeneous society, but has in recent decades become home to a number of foreign residents (4.9%). A number of its foreign residents are ethnic Koreans ("Overseas Koreans") with foreign citizenship. Many residents from China, post-Soviet states, the United States and Japan who may meet criteria for expedited acquisition of South Korean citizenship. In recent decades, discussions have continued to be held both abroad and in Korea on the topics of race and multi-culturalism.

== Notation ==
South Korean nationalism is written in English and Korean language as follows:

- "Statism" (국가주의; 國家主義; kukkajuŭi)
- "State nationalism" (국민주의; 國民主義; kungminjuŭi)
- "Patriotism" (애국주의; 愛國主義; aegukchuŭi / 애국심; 愛國心; aeguksim)
- "South Korean nationalism" (대한민국주의; 大韓民國主義; Taehanmin'gukchuŭi)
- "Republic of Korea nationalism" (대한민국 내셔널리즘; Taehanmin'guk naesyŏnŏllijŭm)

== History ==
Today, South Korea–based state nationalism is advocated by some conservative forces, including the New Right Movement, while left-leaning forces are more inclined to anti-imperialistic ethnic nationalism. Examples of ethno-nationalism can be seen in Korean history, such as the anti-Japanese resistance independence movement in Japanese colonial era and the anti-American/anti-dictatorship democracy movement in the 1980s. However, an example of state nationalism can also be seen in South Korea, such as Park Chung Hee's authoritarian politics, which was similar to the Japanese Shōwa statism.

=== 20th century ===
In 1945, Korea was liberated from Japanese colonial rule, the northern Korea was occupied by the Soviet Union, and the southern Korea was occupied by the United States. by the United States. Northern Korea was quickly taken over by the communists, with Kim Il Sung as the focal point, so from early in 1947, Rhee insisted on establishing a "separate government in South Korea" (남한 단독 정부), acknowledging the difficulties in establishing a unified Korean government. Rhee's stance faced opposition from many pan-Korean nationalists.

In 1949, the Rhee government adopted Ilminism, which combined the state identity of the Republic of Korea with ethnic-based ultranationalism. This ideology was abandoned after 1952, but Rhee never gave up on some elements of Ilminism: the bukjin tongil (북진통일) of the Korean Peninsula by force of South Korea until he resigned as president.

Park Chung-hee, who became president in 1961, began to put more emphasis on South Korea's economy than Rhee's alleged military Korean reunification by South Korea, insisting on "development first, unification later" (선경제 후통일). However, he took advantage of the ethnic nationalist sentiment to promote economic growth and maintain authoritarian power; in 1972, he took the initiative to enact the Pledge of Allegiance to the Flag. Modern South Korean nationalist and patriotic sentiments are deeply related to Park's legacy.

=== 21th century ===
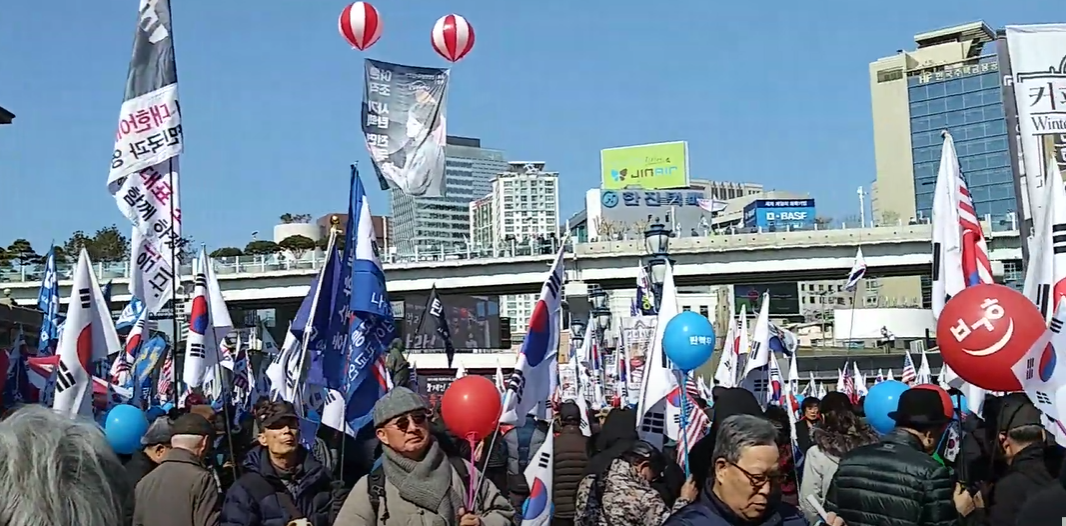
Taegukgi rallies in 2019

The South Korean nationality law is based on jus sanguinis instead of jus solis, which is a territorial principle that takes into account the place of birth when bestowing nationality. In 2005, the opposition Grand National Party suggested a revision of the current South Korean nationality law to allow South Korean nationality to be bestowed to people who are born in South Korea regardless of the nationalities of their parents but it was discarded due to unfavorable public opinion against such a measure.

A poll by the Asan Institute for Policy Studies in 2015 found that only 5.4% of South Koreans in their twenties saw North Koreans as people sharing the same bloodline with them. The poll also found that only 11% of South Koreans associated North Korea with Koreans, with most people associating them with words like military, war or nuclear weapons. It also found that most South Koreans expressed deeper feelings of "closeness" with Americans and Chinese than with North Koreans. According to a December 2017 survey released by the Korea Institute for National Unification, 72.1% of South Koreans in their 20s believe reunification is unnecessary. At the same time, Steven Denney from the University of Toronto said that, "Younger South Koreans feel closer to North Korean migrants than, say, foreign workers, but they will feel closer to a native born child of non-Korean ethnicity than a former resident of North Korea."

According to the Carnegie Endowment for International Peace, ethnicity-based nationalism has been decreasing among younger generations of South Koreans, who have taken more in pride from the country's democratic system, technological innovation, and cultural soft power. According to Hanwool Jeong's research from the 2020 Korean Identity Survey, while national identification rose to 90%, ethnic affinity has declined to 64%, with a larger drop among younger people.

According to a survey of 56 countries conducted by the Sinophone Borderlands project between 2020 and 2022, South Koreans have the world's most negative view of China; China's economic sanctions—including the Hallyu ban following South Korea's THAAD deployment by South Korea—intensified anti-China (including both anti-Chinese and anti-PRC) sentiment in South Korea, which led to the rise of South Korean nationalism. When Yoon Suk Yeol was impeached after the 2024 martial law crisis, anti-China conspiracy theories quickly spread among his ultraconservative supporters. Also, anti-China sentiment was linked to right-wing to far-right People Power Party's populism.

== New Right movement ==
The New Right (뉴라이트) movement in South Korean politics is a school of political thought which developed as a reaction against the traditional divide between conservatives (the "old right") and progressives. they oppose the main elements of Korean nationalism (including anti-Japanese sentiment), and value the history of "Republic of Korea" (which was founded after 1948), more than the history of the Korean independence movement.

== Gukppong ==
Gukppong (국뽕) is a derogatory Korean word that is used to pejoratively describe a South Korean nationalist. The word is made up of the Korean word guk (국), which means country or state, and ppong (뽕) which is believed to have originated from the word philopon (覚醒剤), which is a Japanese slang for the drug methamphetamine. As a result, the word literally means "intoxicated with nationalism".

== 'Foundation Day' controversy ==
In South Korea, there is no consensus on when the Republic of Korea was founded.

Those who support "Korean nationalism" believe that it was founded in 1919: the Constitution of the Republic of Korea regards 1919, the year in which the March First Movement took place and the Provisional Government was established, as the year of the founding. (Note: See Legitimacy Theory of the Provisional Government) Proponents of this view cite the examples of the United States and the Republic of China: the United States commemorates 1776, the year the Declaration of Independence was issued ("Independence Day"), rather than 1781, the year the Confederation was established, and the Republic of China commemorates 1911, the year the Xinhai Revolution was declared ("Double Ten Day"), rather than 1912, the year its first government was established.

However, those who support "South Korean nationalism" argue that 15 August 1948, when the government of the Republic of Korea was established, should be designated as the "Foundation Day" (건국절). They argue that the claim that the Republic of Korea was established in 1919 is historical revisionism. Internationally, South Korea is regarded as the same as the Republic of Korea and is believed to have been established in 1948.

== Geopolitics ==
South Korean nationalism is often characterized by strong anti–North Korean and sometimes combined with anti-Chinese sentiment. Pro-Americanism and Christian nationalism also often combines with South Korean nationalism.

While 20th-century South Korean nationalists, including Syngman Rhee, were both pro-American and anti-Japanese, but some 21st-century South Korean nationalists—including New Right activists—are pro-Japanese. (Note: According to a poll in conducted in late 2025 by the Japanese Public Interest Incorporated Newspaper and the Communications Research Association, 56.4% of South Koreans had a favorable view of Japan, with favorability especially high in those in their 20s and 30s.) These diplomatic views should be distinguished from anti-Japanese Korean ethnic nationalism (minjok).

== Views ==
According to Korea scholar Brian Reynolds Myers, a professor at Dongseo University, South Koreans tend to see the "Korean minjok" and their (South Korean) state differently. According to Myers, the South Korean flag is often seen by South Koreans as representing the "Korean ethnicity" rather than merely South Korea itself. The prioritization of ethno nationalism was also reflected in the pre-2011 South Korean military oath and pre-2007 pledge of allegiance, both of which pledged allegiance to the "Korean minjok".

Emma Campbell from the Australian National University argues that the conceptions of South Korean nationalism are evolving among young people and that a new form is emerging that has globalised cultural characteristics. According to Campbell's study, for which she interviewed 150 South Koreans in their twenties, the desire for reunification is declining. However, these who are in favor of a Korean unification state reasons different from ethnic nationalism. The respondents stated that they only wanted unification if it would not disrupt life in the South or if North Korea achieves economic parity with the South. A small number of respondents further mentioned that they support a "unification on the condition that it did not take place in their lifetime." Campbell argued that her interviews showed that many young South Koreans have no problems to accepting foreigners as part of uri nara (우리나라).

South Korean [state] nationalism is strongly rejected by left-wing Korean [ethnic] nationalists, because it is partly influenced by Japan's para-fascist kokkashugi and legacy of radical anti-communist after 1945 (which manifested as political authoritarianism and mass killings). They claim that this ideology is "violent and exclusive".

== List of nationalist groups ==
This list enumerates South Korea-centric nationalist groups within South Korea that are not pan-Korean (minjok) nationalist. (Note: In the 20th century, anti-communist dictatorial ruling parties such as the Liberal Party, the Democratic Republican Party, and the Democratic Justice Party exhibited both South Korean [state] nationalism (kukka) and Korean [ethnic] nationalism (minjok).)

- The Chosun Ilbo (1920–present) – as of 1948 and later (there was no country called South Korea before 1948)
- Unification Church (1954–present) – It is also classified as a Korean nationalist organization in support of unification, but supports unification led by South Korea.
- Grand National Party → Saenuri Party → Liberty Korea Party (1997–2020)
- Our Republican Party (2017–2020)
- Our Republican Party (2020–present)
- United Future Party → People Power Party (2020–present)
  - Future Korea Party (2020) → People Future Party (2024)

== See also ==
- Hwang Woo-suk
- North Korean nationalism
- Pledge of Allegiance (South Korea)
- Propaganda in South Korea
