= Volk =

German noun meaning "people"

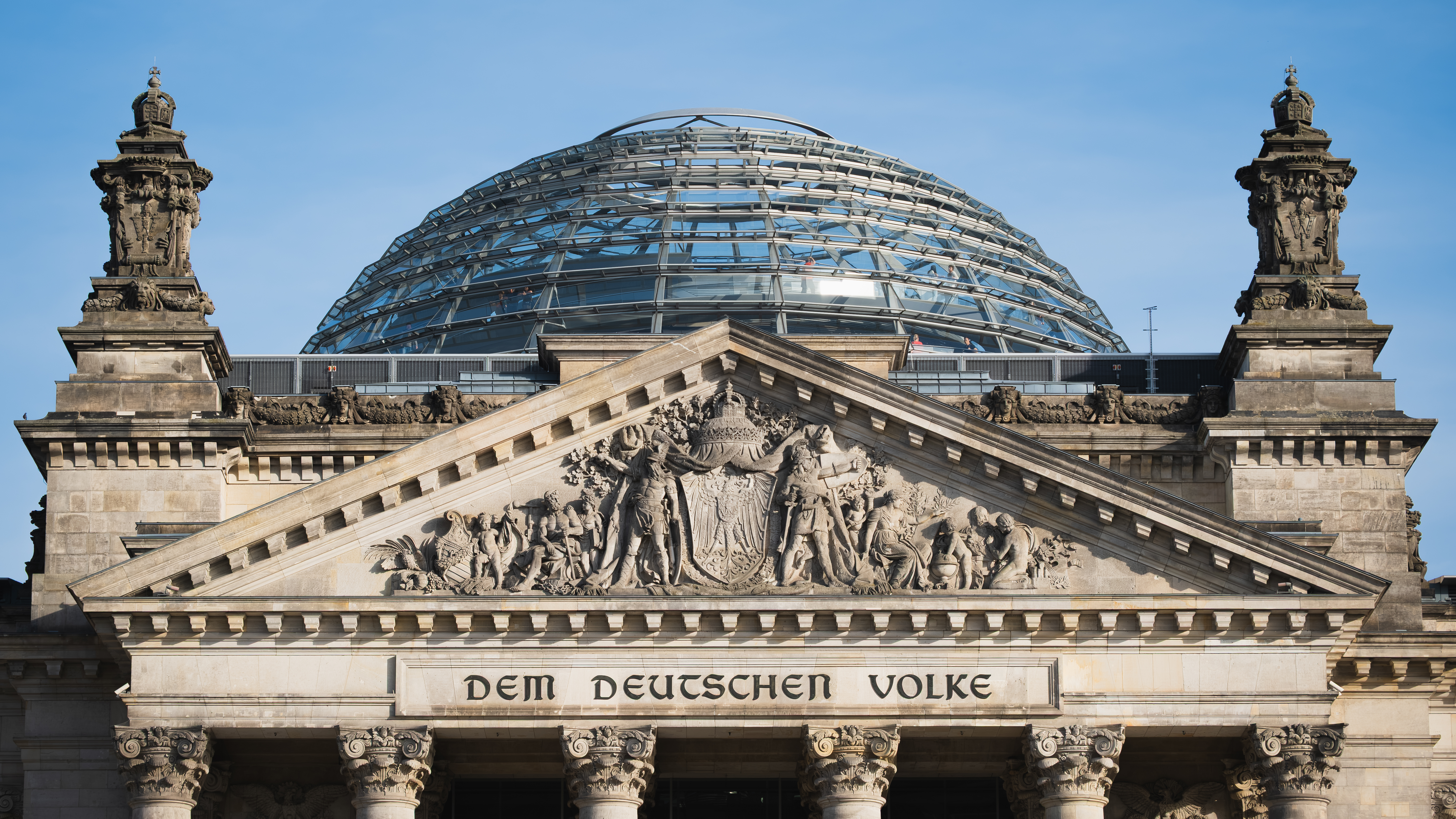
Dem Deutschen Volke (lit. 'To the German People'), the dedication on the Reichstag building in Berlin

The German noun Volk (German pronunciation: [fɔlk]) translates to people, both uncountable in the sense of people as in a crowd, and countable (plural Völker) in the sense of a people as in an ethnic group or nation (compare the English term folk).

Within an English-language context, the German word is of interest primarily for its use in German philosophy, as in Volksseele ("national soul"), and in German nationalism – notably the derived adjective völkisch ("national, ethnic").

== Etymology ==
Volk is the cognate of English folk and also overlaps in the usage of the latter as in Volksmusik "folk music", Volksglaube "folk belief" etc. In the 18th century, German Volk was mostly reserved for "crowd" or "mass of the population", while the concept of "a people" or "a nation" was now expressed by the Latinism Nation. Use of Nation in this sense was replaced by Volk after 1800, explicitly in the context of emergent German nationalism.

Compounds in which Volk- translates to "populace" or "nation" include Volksentscheid (plebiscite, literally "decision of/by the people") Völkerbund (League of Nations). The somewhat obsolete meaning of the common people, hoi polloi, working class is visible in the brand name Volkswagen "people's car", historically a name chosen by the German Labour Front in 1937 for a car designed to be affordable to the "common man".

In contrast to German Volk being elevated to the sense of "nation" in the early 19th century, English folk came to be seen as inelegant at around the same time, being mostly replaced by the latinate people. It re-entered formal or academic English only through the invention of the word folklore, coined in 1846 by William J. Thoms as an Anglo-Saxonism. This word revived folk in a modern sense of "of the common people, whose culture is handed down orally", and opened up a flood of compound formations, e.g. folk art (1921), folk-hero (1899), folk-medicine (1898), folk-tale (1891), folk-song (1847), folk-music (1889), folk-dance (1912).

== German national identity ==
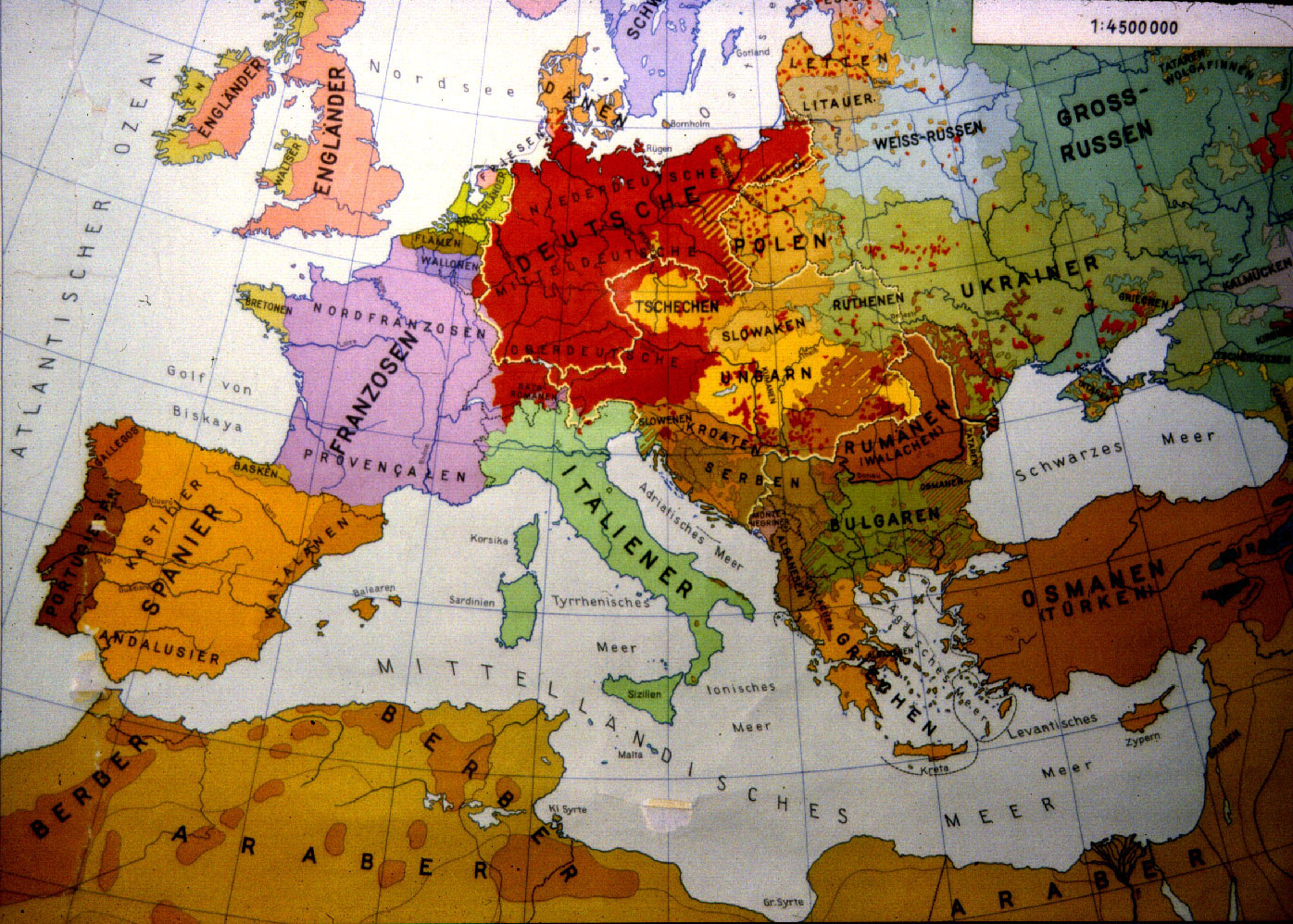
1914 ethnic map, after a German nation state had been established without the ethnic German areas of Austria

In German philosophy of the late 18th and 19th centuries, Volksgeist is used in the sense of "national spirit", not necessarily in reference to the German nation, but still strongly correlated with the development of a German national identity in the wake of the dissolution of the Holy Roman Empire.

The völkisch movement originates in this time, proposing the formation of a German nation state as a solution to the "German Question". Johann Gottlieb Fichte in his Addresses to the German Nation, published still during the Napoleonic Wars from 1808 onwards, asked, in the eighth address, "What is a Volk, in the higher sense of the term, and what is love of the fatherland?," He answered that it could only be that "particular spiritual nature of the human environment out of which he himself, with all of his thought and action... has arisen, namely the people from which he is descended and among which he has been formed and grown into that which he is". The movement combined sentimental patriotic interest in German folklore, local history and a "back-to-the-land" anti-urban populism with many parallels with expressions of Romantic nationalism in other parts of Europe, such as the writings of William Morris. "In part this ideology was a revolt against modernity," Nicholls remarked.

Throughout much of the 19th century, it was not universally agreed that there was such a thing as a single "German nation" (Volk). The "Germans" (die Deutschen) were rather seen as the equivalent of what would now be called the Germanic peoples, i.e. a large ethno-linguistic phylum comprising a number of peoples (such as the German "stems" or tribes of the Franks (or Franconians), Swabians, Bavarians, Thuringians, Saxons, etc.; also included into the term were the Scandinavians and the Anglo-Saxons, e.g. the Brothers' Grimm Deutsche Sagen of 1816–1818 which includes legends of Germanic antiquity as well as of German, Austrian and Swiss folklore.

In the wake of the Revolutions of 1848, the Frankfurt Parliament attempted to create a national constitution for all German states but rivalry between Prussian and Austrian interests resulted in proponents of the parliament advocating a "Lesser German" solution (a monarchical German nation-state without Austria). The King of Prussia, Frederick William IV of Prussia, refused the offer and efforts to create a liberal German nation-state faltered and collapsed. A division developed among German nationalists, with one group led by the Prussians that supported a "Lesser Germany" that excluded Austria and another group that supported a "Greater Germany" that included Austria. Prussia achieved hegemony over Germany in the "wars of unification": the Second Schleswig War (1864), the Austro-Prussian War (1866), which effectively established the separation of Austria from Germany, and the Franco-Prussian War of 1870/1, after which the unification of Germany was finally achieved, by the fusion of the North German Confederation (dominated by Prussia) and the South or Central German states of Bavaria, Württemberg, Baden and Hesse.

== Nazi era ==
Adolf Hitler in Mein Kampf denounced usage of the word völkisch as he considered it too vague as to carry any recognizable meaning due to former over-use, although he used it often, especially in connection with ethnic Germans or Volksdeutsche.

During the Third Reich era, the term Volk became heavily used in nationalistic political slogans, particularly in slogans such as Volk ohne Raum – "(a) people or race without space" or Völkischer Beobachter ("popular or racial observer"), an NSDAP party newspaper. Also the political slogan Ein Volk, ein Reich, ein Führer ("One nation, one realm, one leader"); the compound word Herrenvolk, translated as "master race"; the "Volksjäger" jet fighter, translated as "people's fighter"; and the term Volksgemeinschaft, translated as "people's community".

The term Volk, in the vision of Nazis, had a broad set of meanings, and referred sometimes to the entirety of German nation and other times to the Nordic race. In the writings of leading Nazi thinkers, such as Alfred Rosenberg and Hans Günther several Völker or "peoples" made up a Rasse or "race", so these two terms did not always denote the same concept.

== After 1945 ==
Unlike the adjective völkisch, which became associated with German nationalism, the German noun Volk remains the unmarked term for "a people" or "nation" (while its older meanings of "a crowd of people" or "commoners" are less current). The Reichstag building retains its dedication, inscribed in 1916, reading dem deutschen Volke ("to the German people").

While Volk suggests an ethnic group or nation, the term Bevölkerung is used in the sense of "populace, resident population". The term Volksdeutsche for "ethnic Germans" retains some usage but is increasingly replaced by Deutschstämmige ("[people] of German descent").

In composition, Volks- retains the meaning "of/for the common people", after the pattern of Volkswagen, sometimes used humorously in advertising (as in Volks-Zahnbürste "people's toothbrush")

"Wir sind das Volk!" ("We are the people!") was a chant used by the Monday demonstrators during the peaceful demonstrations of 1989/1990 to end the GDR and bring down the Berlin Wall. The slogan meant that the "simple people" would no longer endure the dictatorship, and wanted to reform the political system of the GDR. It did not necessarily express support for the idea of a reunification. However, the slogan was also altered to "Wir sind ein Volk!" ("We are one people") during the course of the protests, indicating the ethnic meaning of Volk, where the division of Germany was regarded as unjust because of the common ethnic identity of all Germans.

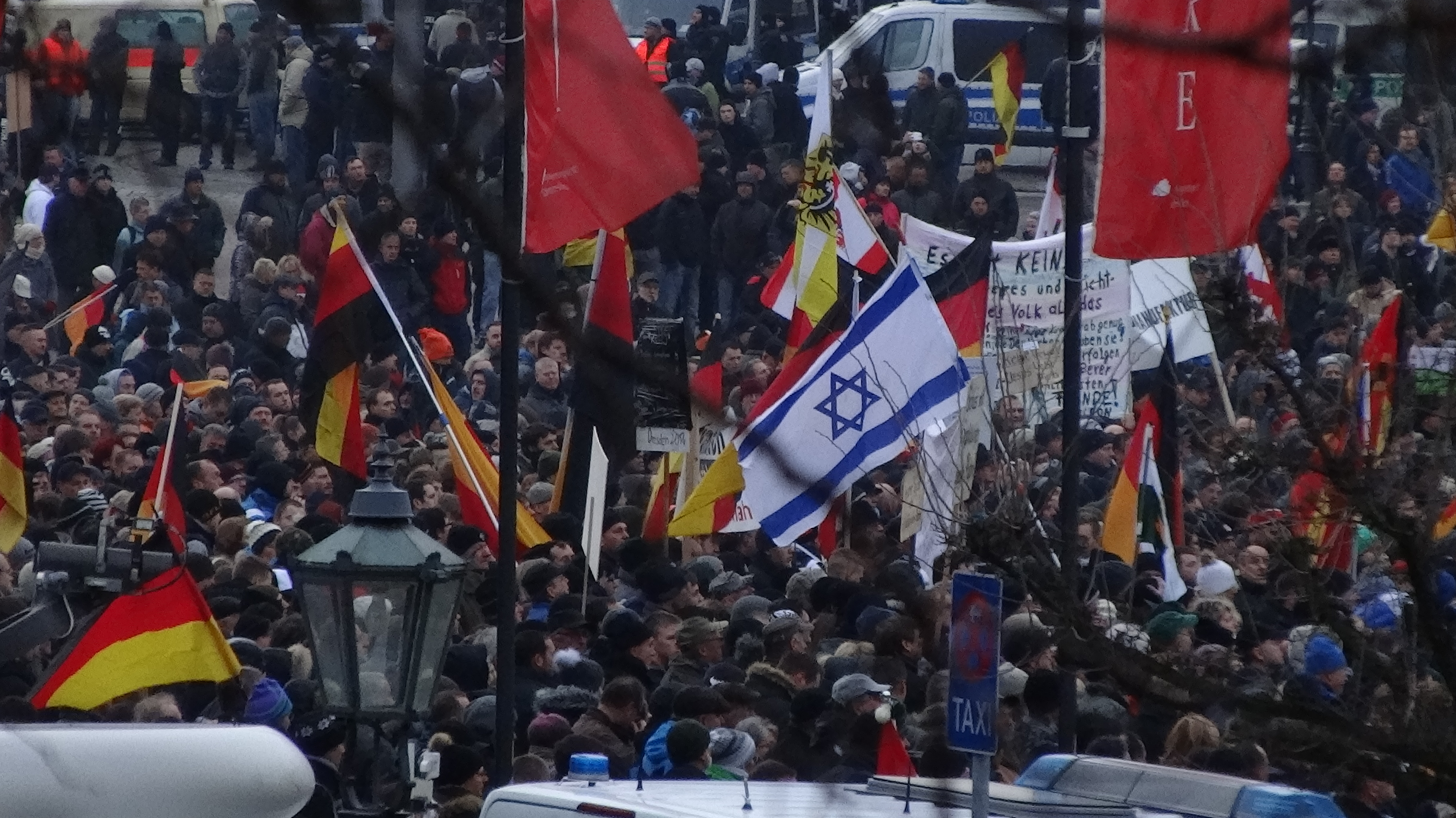
First Pegida protest in daytime, January 2015

In 2015 the slogan "Wir sind das Volk" became popular again among members of PEGIDA (a nationalist movement), and various groups that claimed to stand in the tradition of Monday Demonstrations. Here, however, the ethnic connotation of "Volk" quickly became obvious. While the slogan "Wir sind ein Volk" was no longer in use since the reunification, the slogan "Wir sind das Volk" was given a new meaning. Now the word "Wir" was used by right wing protesters to refer to themselves, in order to distinguish from migrants and so-called "Gutmenschen", Germans that supported refugees. After Chancellor Angela Merkel decided to give shelter to a growing number of refugees, especially from Syria, in 2015, right wing groups as well as more modest movements, that were referred to by the media as "the concerned citizens", started to use the slogan. They wanted to indicate that, according to their beliefs, the Volk (meaning only ethnic Germans) should have more rights than immigrants and especially refugees. The similarity to the National Socialist Volk conception was pointed out by various media. The protesters also made references to the protests against the dictatorship of the GDR, since they regarded it as their right to decide whether the state should give shelter to refugees or not. This, however, is a constitutional right in Germany for "[p]ersons persecuted on political grounds" that can not be changed unless the constitution is changed with a two-thirds majority in both houses of the parliament; however, asylum seekers who enter "from a member state of the European Communities" already have no constitutional right to asylum.

== Outside of German ==
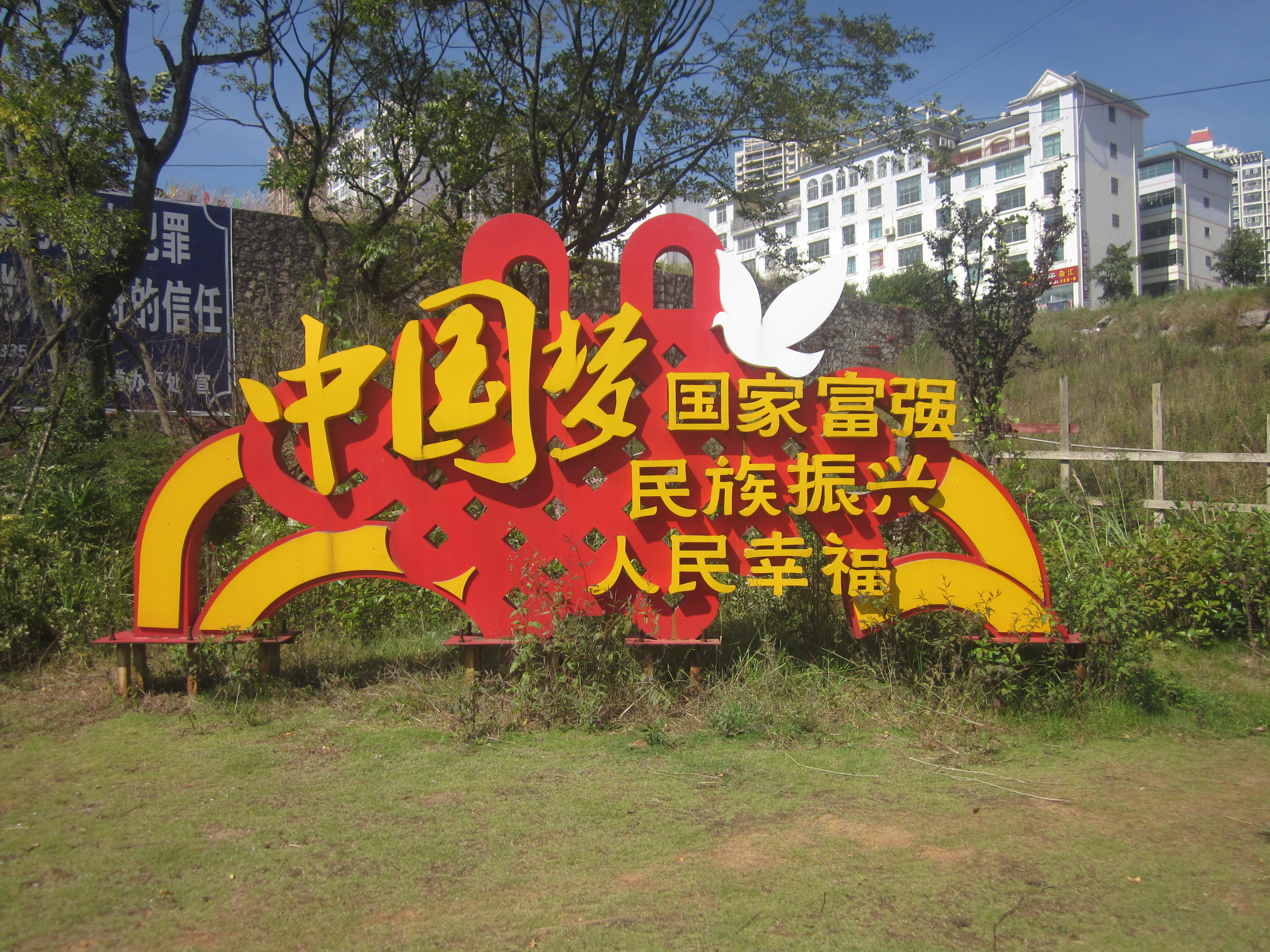
A "Chinese Dream" slogan reading "Prosperous of state, rejuvenation of Volk, and happiness of the people" (国家富强; 民族振兴; 人民幸福) in the South Lake Park, Panzhou, Guizhou, China, November 2019

The term Volk was translated into minzoku (Kanji: 民族, lit: people; ethnic group) by Japan in the Meiji Era. Throughout the period of the Empire of Japan, these word were used frequently, especially minzoku to indicate the superiority of the "Yamato race". These word are not often used in Japan today, but they are used by some right-wing conservative and Japanese nationalist politicians. Taro Aso has called Japan a "one race" or "one minzoku". (Note: 民族 (Korean: 민족, Vietnamese: dân tộc) is sometimes translated as "race" (German: Volk) depending on the context, but is distinct from 人種 (Korean: 인종) or 種族 (Vietnamese: chủng tộc) which purely means "race" (German: Rasse).)

民族 greatly influenced the nationalism (mainly romantic nationalism) of East Asian countries. It is often used by nationalists in China ("zhonghua minzu"), Korea ("minjok"), and Vietnam ("dân tộc").

The Volk-based nationalism is deeply related to the nation-buildings in modern Chinese, Japanese and Korean nationalism. The term "zhonghua minzu" ("中华民族") is a very important concept in explaining mainland Chinese nationalism. "Zhonghua minzu" is also appears in March of the Volunteers, the official national anthem of China. The term "minjok" ("民族") was reflected in South Korea's Pledge of Allegiance before 2007.

== See also ==
- Volcae
- Völkisch nationalism
- Populus
- Pueblo
- People
- Þeod
- Volksdeutsche
- Johann Gottfried Herder
- Volksgeist
- Volkshalle
- Volksmusik
- Volkshochschule
- Volkssturm
- Volkswagen
- Dutch
- Folk music
