= Asan Institute for Policy Studies =

Think tank in Seoul, South Korea

Coordinates: 37.57220°N 126.96833°E

- 아산정책연구원
- Founded: February 11, 2008; 18 years ago
- Founder: Chung Mong-joon
- Type: Think tank
- Purpose: Research
- Location: Jongno District, Seoul

The Asan Institute for Policy Studies (Korean: 아산정책연구원; Hanja: 峨山政策硏究院) is an independent, non-profit think tank based in Seoul, South Korea. The institute was founded by the honorary chairman Chung Mong-joon in 2008. The institute conducts research in national security and foreign policy, area studies, public opinion, domestic politics, social science methodology, and global governance.

In 2015, it was ranked one of the top 100 think tanks in the world by the Chinese Academy of Social Sciences. The Asan Institute was also ranked 5th among foreign policy and security-related research institutions in the Korea Economic Daily's annual survey of "Korea's Top 100 Think Tanks in 2016."

The Asan Report entitled 'In China's Shadow' was published in September 2016. The report garnered worldwide media attention, making headlines in the Wall Street Journal and New York Times, along with more than 200 Korean and international media outlets.

== Programs ==
=== Asan Forum ===
The Asan Forum is a bimonthly journal launched in 2013 for in-depth interpretation of rapid changes across the Asia-Pacific region.

=== Asan Academy ===
The Asan Academy (아산서원; 峨山書院) offers a liberal arts educational program based on a combination of Korea's Confucian system of scholarship (Seowon) and the University of Oxford's renowned "Philosophy, Politics, and Economics" (PPE) degree. All selected Asan Young Fellows live and share the same routine activities throughout their studies in Korea and also learn to bond and appreciate the value of community through monthly volunteer work and community outreach activities. The Asan Academy also provides Asan Young Fellows with the opportunity to work as interns at leading think tanks and non-profit organizations (NPOs) in either Washington, D.C. or Beijing, China.

== Leadership ==
Founder & Honorary Chairman: Dr. Chung Mong-joon

Chairman of the Board of Trustees: Dr. Hang Sung-Joo
