= Brian Reynolds Myers =

American Koreanist (born 1963)

- Born: 1963 (age 62–63); New Jersey, U.S.
- Education: Ruhr University; University of Tübingen
- Occupation: Professor
- Organization(s): Dongseo University, Busan, South Korea
- Known for: The Cleanest Race (2010); A Reader's Manifesto (2002)
- Spouse: Myung-hee Myers
- Relatives: Glenn Lynn Myers (father)
- Website: www.sthelepress.com

Brian Reynolds Myers (born 1963), usually cited as B. R. Myers, is an American professor of international studies at Dongseo University in Busan, South Korea, best known for his writings on North Korean propaganda. He is a contributing editor for The Atlantic and an opinion columnist for The New York Times and The Wall Street Journal. Myers is the author of Han Sŏrya and North Korean Literature (Cornell, 1994), A Reader's Manifesto (Melville House, 2002), The Cleanest Race (Melville House, 2010), and North Korea's Juche Myth (Sthele Press, 2015).

== Early life and education ==
Myers was born in New Jersey, near Fort Dix. His mother is British, and his father was a U.S. Army officer from Pennsylvania who served in South Korea as a military chaplain, often helping out local orphans. Myers is also a descendant of John F. Reynolds though his father.

Myers spent his childhood in Bermuda and his high school youth in apartheid-era South Africa, and received graduate education in West Berlin during the early 1980s, occasionally visiting East Germany. He earned an MA degree in Soviet studies at Ruhr University (1989) and a PhD degree in Korean studies with a focus on North Korean literature at the University of Tübingen (1992). Myers subsequently taught German in Japan and worked for a Mercedes-Benz liaison office in Beijing during the mid-1990s.

== Career ==
Before his appointment at Dongseo University, Myers lectured in North Korean literature and society at the Korea University's North Korean Studies Department. He also taught globalization and North Korean literature at the Inje University Korean Studies Department.

=== Journalism ===
==== Opinion columns ====
Myers’s opinion columns for the Atlantic, The New York Times, and The Wall Street Journal generally focus on North Korea, which he says is not a Marxist-Leninist or a Stalinist state, but a "national-socialist country." He has also commented in The New York Times on the common view of the ROKS Cheonan sinking in South Korea with regard to its perception of North Korea. He stated that there was a lack of outrage over the incident among South Koreans due to the racialized nature of Korean nationalism; in other words, there was no major uproar over the incident in South Korea because of the concept of racial solidarity with the North Koreans that many South Koreans feel, which Myers said overruled patriotism towards South Korea in many cases. Myers stated that inter-Korean racial solidarity manifests itself by South Koreans supporting the North Korean soccer team at the FIFA World Cup and such. He contrasted the racialized nature of South Korean nationalism with the civic nature of U.S. nationalism, stating that South Korea's antipathy over attacks by North Korea was potentially dangerous to the national security of the South Korean state:

South Korean nationalism is something quite different from the patriotism toward the state that Americans feel. Identification with the Korean race is strong, while that with the Republic of Korea is weak.

==== Book reviews ====
His book reviews have included denunciations of American historian Bruce Cumings (who he says is an admirer of the North Korean regime), American author Toni Morrison, American author Denis Johnson, South Korean novelist Hwang Sok-yong, and American author Jonathan Franzen.

== Books ==
Myers' Han Sŏrya and the North Korean literature: The Failure of Socialist Realism in the DPRK (1994) was adapted from his 1992 dissertation at the University of Tübingen and published as the sixty-ninth volume of the Cornell East Asia Series.

A Reader’s Manifesto: An Attack on the Growing Pretentiousness in American Literary Prose (2002) was developed from his critical review essay of the same name published in the Atlantic in 2001.

The Cleanest Race: How North Koreans See Themselves and Why It Matters (2010) is a discussion of North Korean propaganda, contending that North Korea under Kim Jong Il was guided by a "paranoid, race-based nationalism with roots in Japanese fascism." Myers asserts that the North Korean political system is not based on communism or Stalinism, and he contends that the official Juche idea is a sham ideology for foreign consumption and intended to establish Kim Il Sung's credentials as a thinker alongside Mao Zedong. Myers also claims that post-Cold War attempts to understand North Korea as a Confucian patriarchy, based on the filial piety of Kim Jong Il and the dynastic transfer of power from his father, are misguided and that the North Korean leadership is maternalist rather than paternalist.

Myers furthers his argument about the status of Juche as a non-ideology in his book North Korea's Juche Myth (2015). According to his own account, promoting him to write the book was the realization he was making "not the slightest bit of headway" with The Cleanest Race in challenging the conventional wisdom about Juche in the academia. North Korea's Juche Myth develops a three-pronged categorization of North Korean propaganda. Some works are in the "inner track", meant for North Korean eyes only. Others are in the "outer track", meant primarily for North Korean consumption but mindful of the fact that foreigners can access them too. "Export track" propaganda specifically targets foreigners.

== Reception ==
Myers’s book The Cleanest Race has been challenged by several academic critics. Charles K. Armstrong, then of Columbia University, suggested that the book "gives an intellectual gloss to attitudes many in the West already have about the DPRK". Felix Abt, a Swiss business affairs specialist who lived in North Korea for seven years, describes Myers' claims in The Cleanest Race as "flawed" and "shaky". Abt wrote that it was "rather absurd" to describe Juche as "window-dressing" for foreigners.

South Korean literary critic Yearn Hong Choi also regards the thesis of Myers's Han Sŏrya and North Korean Literature as erroneous:

How can Myers say that he [Han Sŏrya] is not a socialist realist? How can Myers say that Han's thought is not compatible with communist ideology? I can understand Myers’s views on orthodox socialist realism, yet I see socialist realism abundantly present in North Korean literature: North Korean writers still advocate socialist realism. Myers simply does not interpret socialist realism as they do.

Tatiana Gabroussenko points out that Myers is the only Western academic who thinks that North Korean literature does not have the hallmarks of socialist realism.

Scholar Andrei Lankov favorably reviewed The Cleanest Race as taking a "fresh approach" on North Korea. Lankov also says Myers's work is "informative" but is not sure whether his thesis has any relation to reality.

Myers's North Korea's Juche Myth was favorably reviewed by Jan Blinka and Balazs Szalontai.

Scholar Pak Noja, also known as Vladimir Tikhonov, a Soviet-born Korean activist and historian, criticized Myers, commenting that had the academic rigor of overseas Koreanology had been a little bit higher, his work would have clearly been established as a non-academic, somewhat amateurish historical revisionist attempt like The Comfort Women of the Empire. He points out that the content of his book, regardless of Myers' inclinations, is so detached from a balanced account of historical facts that citing it can lead one into confusion. Also, Pak points out that Myers' claims are similar to New Right.

== Personal life and politics ==
Myers is married to a South Korean woman, Myung-hee Myers. He lives and teaches in South Korea, where he moved to in September 2001. During the late 1990s, he lived in Valencia County, New Mexico. Politically, Myers is a supporter of the Green Party of the United States and animal rights. Myers can speak Korean, Mandarin, Japanese, and German. He is a vegan.

=== South Korea politics ===
Despite his progressive view of American politics, he is often regarded as a "conservative" in South Korea because he has a critical view of the "nationalist-left" political views of South Korean liberals and progressives, including the Democratic Party of Korea. In a December 2014 interview with conservative Munhwa Ilbo, Myers identified himself as a "conservative and staunch anti-North Korea". He opposes anti-Japanese/anti-imperialist Korean nationalism (minjok) and advocates state-based South Korean nationalism. According to the Hankyoreh, left-leaning media in 2011, Myers rated it as having a "typical view of American conservatism".

South Korean liberals and progressives support the view that the Republic of Korea (South Korea) was founded in 1919, when the Provisional Government was established, not 1948, the official establishment of the South Korea government. In contrast, South Korean conservatives recognize Aug. 15, 1948, as the 'founding day' of the Republic of Korea. Myers supported the position of South Korean conservatives by expressing the view that August 15, 1948, should be commemorated by enacting the founding anniversary.

Myers had an interview in 2024 with the ultraconservative Segye Ilbo, supported by the Unification Church; he opposed the Impeachment of Park Geun-hye and defended pro-Park conservatives. Myers defended Park Geun-hye, accusing the Impeachment of a "parliamentary coup".

== Bibliography ==
- Myers, Brian Reynolds (1994). Han Sŏrya and North Korean Literature: The Failure of Socialist Realism in the DPRK. Ithaca, New York: Cornell East Asia Program. ISBN 0-939657-84-8.
- — (2002). A Reader's Manifesto: An Attack on the Growing Pretentiousness of American Literary Prose. Hoboken, New Jersey: Melville House Publishing. ISBN 0-9718659-0-6.
- — (2010). The Cleanest Race: How North Koreans See Themselves and Why It Matters. Hoboken, New Jersey: Melville House Publishing. ISBN 978-1-933633-91-6.
- — (2015). North Korea's Juche Myth. Busan: Sthele Press. ISBN 978-1-5087-9993-1.

== See also ==
- Propaganda in North Korea
