= Rick Kittles =

American geneticist

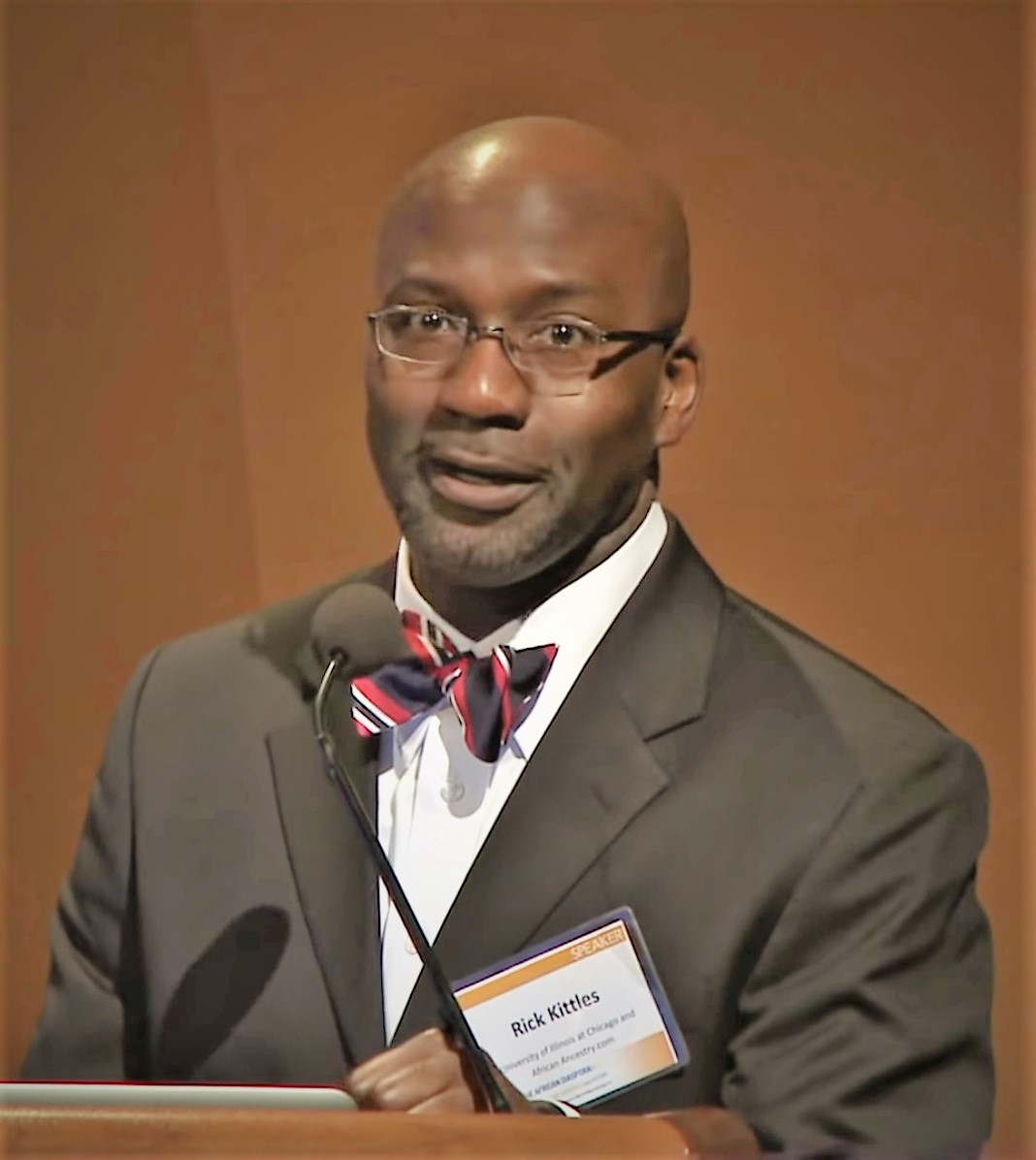
Kittles speaks at the National Human Genome Research Institute in 2013

Rick Antonius Kittles (born in Sylvania, Georgia, United States) is an American biologist specializing in human genetics and a Senior Vice President for Research at the Morehouse School of Medicine. He is of African-American ancestry, and achieved renown in the 1990s for his pioneering work in tracing the ancestry of African Americans via DNA testing.

He has previously held positions at Howard University (1998–2004), Ohio State University (2004–2006), the University of Chicago (2006–2010), the University of Illinois Chicago (2010–2014), the University of Arizona (2014–2017), and the City of Hope National Medical Center (2017–2022).

== Biography ==
Kittles was raised in Central Islip, New York. Rick holds a B.S. degree in biology from the Rochester Institute of Technology (1989), where he pledged Kappa Alpha Psi fraternity, and a Ph.D. in biology from George Washington University in Washington, D.C. (1998).

In 1990 he began his career as a teacher in several New York and Washington, D.C. area high schools. From approximately 1995 until 1999, as a researcher with the New York African Burial Ground Project (NYABGP), a federally funded project in New York City, in which Howard University researchers, led by anthropologist Michael Blakey, exhumed the remains of 408 African Americans from an 18th-century graveyard; Kittles gathered DNA samples from the remains and compared them with samples from a DNA database to determine from where in Africa the individuals buried in the graveyard had come.

Beginning in 1998, as he was completing his Ph.D. at George Washington University, Kittles was hired as an assistant professor of microbiology at Howard University in Washington, D.C., and also named director of the African American Hereditary Prostate Cancer (AAHPC) Study Network at the university's National Human Genome Center. Kittles also co-directed the molecular genetics unit of Howard University's National Human Genome Center. He served in these positions until 2004. Beginning in 2004, he served as an associate professor in the Department of Molecular Virology, Immunology & Medical Genetics at the Tzagournis Medical Research Facility of Ohio State University in Columbus, Ohio.

He is currently the leader of the Washington, D.C.–based African Ancestry Inc., a genetic testing service for determining individuals' African ancestry, which he co-founded with Gina Paige in February 2003. He also serves as an associate professor in the Department of Medicine and the Division of Epidemiology and Biostatistics at the University of Illinois, Chicago.

He was featured in the BBC Two films Motherland: A Genetic Journey and Motherland – Moving On (released in 2003 and 2004, respectively), as well as in part 4 of the 2006 PBS series African American Lives (hosted by Henry Louis Gates). On October 7, 2007, he was featured on the American TV newsmagazine 60 Minutes. In February 2008 he appeared in part 4 of African American Lives 2.

He has published on genetic variation and prostate cancer genetics of African Americans. In addition, he discovered, through a DNA analysis, he descends mainly of people of Dakar, Senegal, and Nigeria's Hausa people.

== Scientific contributions ==
Kittles was one of the earliest geneticists to trace the ancestry of Africans through DNA testing. This led him to co-found the company African Ancestry Inc., which set out to be the leading advocate for tracing the ancestry of individuals with African descent. Kittles is known for his work on prostate cancer but he devotes part of his time to study and research other diseases such as colon and breast cancer, sickle cell anemia, red blood cell immune response, and pulmonary hypertension. Kittles has been an advocate for studying prostate cancer among African Americans for much of his scientific career; his primary concern however, was to find out how genes and the environment increased the risk of prostate cancer.

Kittles has performed a large amount of research, including publishing over 160 peer-reviewed articles, over his career with much of this work being devoted to issues such as genetic ancestry and health disparities among African Americans and other minority groups. Kittles has also been a part of many cutting edge developments including the progress of genetic markers and how an individual's ancestry can be used to help identify risk of disease and health outcomes. More recently, Kittles and his team have been conducting genetic sequencing trials to try and find variations in genes that affect a person's response to drugs.

== Publications ==
- Kittles, Ricky Antonius (1998). "The Finnish Population Bottlenecks: Exploiting the Evolutionary History of Genes for Population and Genetic Disease Studies." Ph.D. dissertation. Washington, D.C.: George Washington University.
- Kittles, Rick, and Charmaine Royal (2003). "The Genetics of African Americans: Implications for Disease Gene Mapping and Identity." In Genetic Nature/Culture: Anthropology and Science Beyond the Two-Culture Divide, ed. Alan H. Goodman, Deborah Heath, and M. Susan Lindee (Papers presented at a Wenner-Gren Foundation international symposium, held June 11–19, 1999 in Teresopolis, Brazil). Berkeley, California: University of California Press, pp. 219–233. ISBN 0-520-23792-7. ISBN 0-520-23793-5.

== See also ==
- Jeffrey C. Long
