= Gibel (surname) =

Gibel is a surname. Notable people with the surname include:

- Christy McGinity Gibel (born 1977), American actress and reality star
- Henry Gibel (1858–1906), Swiss-born American architect
- Katya Gibel Mevorach (born 1952), American academic
