= Sarah Richardson (disambiguation) =

Sarah Richardson (born 1971) is a Canadian TV host and interior designer.

Sarah or Sara or similar, surnamed Richardson, may also refer to:

- Sarah Katharine Richardson (1854–1927), British mountain climber
- Sarah Richardson, British politician, Lord Mayor of Westminster, wife of Damian Collins
- Sarah Richardson, musician in The Creeping Nobodies
- Sarah S. Richardson, American philosopher and historian
- Sara Thomas (born 1941), née Richardson, American educator and politician

== See also ==
- Richardson (surname)
- Sarah (given name)
