= Richard Thompson Ford =

American author and law professor

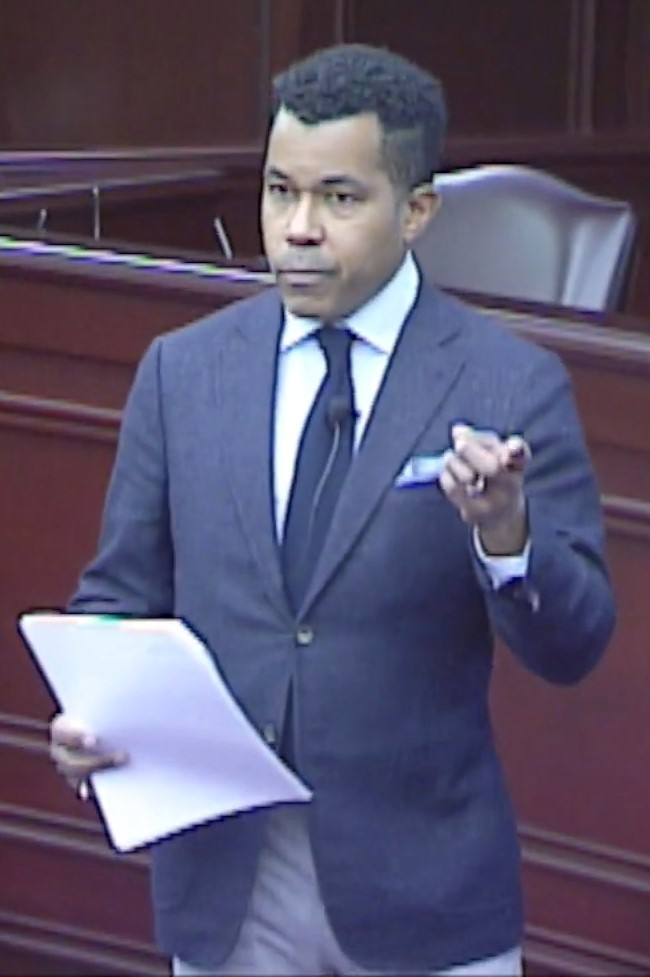
Ford speaks in 2018

Richard Thompson Ford is the George E. Osborne Professor of Law at Stanford Law School. His scholarship includes work on critical race theory, local government law, housing segregation, and employment discrimination. He has served as a housing commissioner for the San Francisco Housing Commission, and continues to work with local governments on issues of affordable housing and segregation. His book Rights Gone Wrong: How Law Corrupts the Struggle for Equality was chosen as one of the New York Times 100 Notable Books of 2011. His 2021 book on dress codes explores the relationship between fashion and power.

He graduated with a BA from Stanford University in 1988 and a JD from Harvard Law School in 1991.

== Selected publications ==
- Dress Codes: How the Laws of Fashion Made History Simon & Schuster, 2021. ISBN 9781501180064
- Universal Rights Down to Earth. New York: W.W. Norton & Co, 2011. ISBN 9780393079005
- Rights Gone Wrong: How Law Corrupts the Struggle for Equality. New York: Farrar, Straus and Giroux, 2011. ISBN 9780374250355
- The Race Card: How Bluffing About Bias Makes Race Relations Worse. Macmillan, 2008. ISBN 9780374245757
- Racial Culture: A Critique (Princeton University Pr., 2005).
- "The Boundaries of Race: Political Geography in Legal Analysis." Harvard Law Review (1994): 1841–1921.
- "Beyond "Difference" : A Reluctant Critique of Legal Identity Politics" in: Left legalism/left critique. Eds. Wendy Brown, and Janet Halley. Duke University Press, 2002. ISBN 9780822329756
- "Geography and Sovereignty: Jurisdictional Formation and Racial Segregation." Stanford Law Review (1997): 1365–1445.
