= Joseph L. Graves Jr. =

American scientist

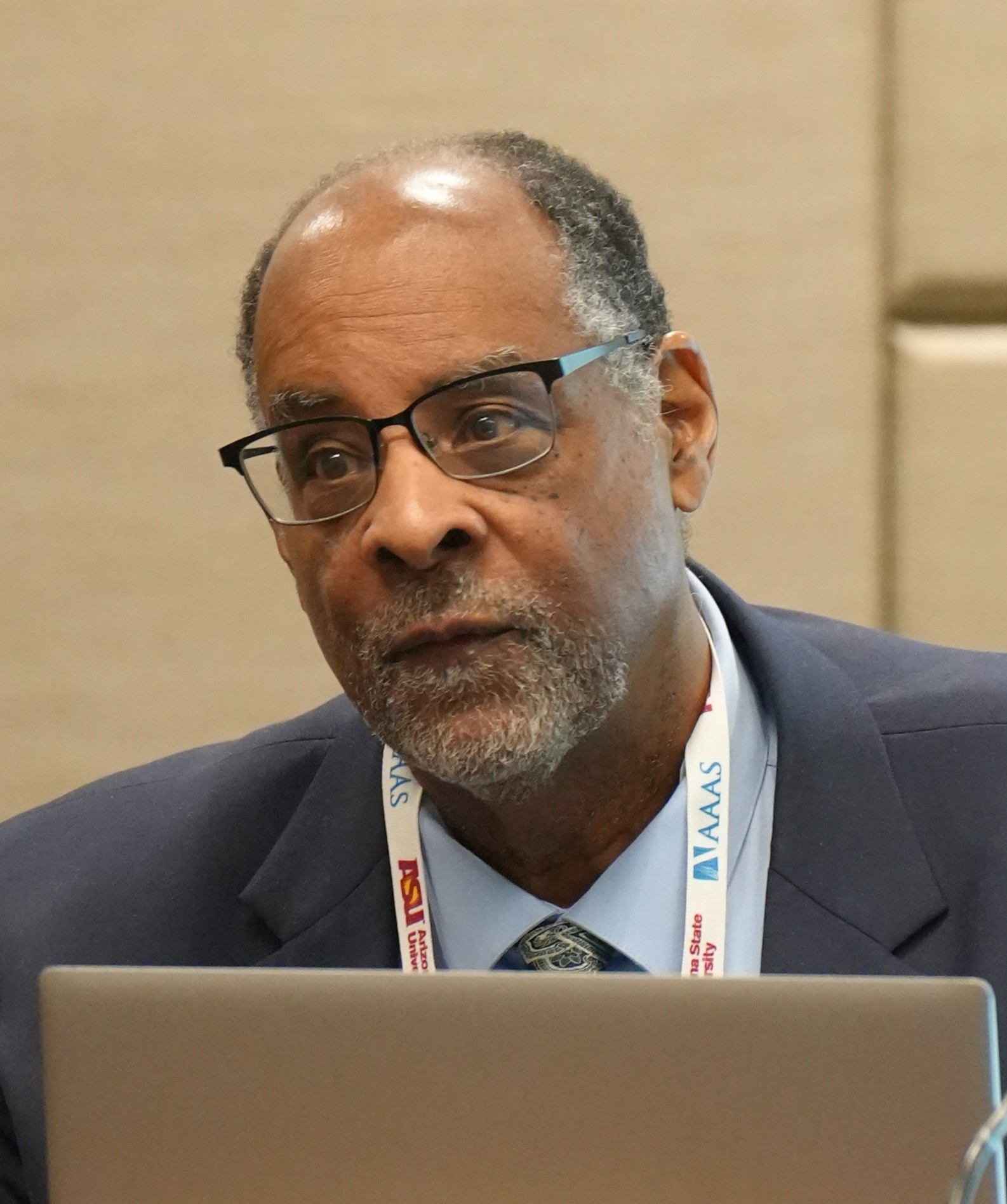
- Graves in 2026
- Born: 1955 (age 70–71)
- Education: Oberlin College (BA); Wayne State University (PhD)
- Occupations: Evolutionary biologist and Geneticist

Joseph L. Graves Jr. (born 1955) is an American evolutionary biologist and geneticist. He is a professor of biological science at North Carolina Agricultural and Technical State University, and a former associate dean for research at the Joint School for Nanoscience and Nanoengineering, which is jointly administered by North Carolina A & T State University and UNC Greensboro.

His past research has included an examination of the evolution and physiological performance in Drosophila, a genus of small flies often called fruit flies. His work includes the genomics of adaptation, as well as the response of bacteria to metallic nanoparticles. A particular application of this research has been to the evolutionary theory of aging.

Drawing upon his background in evolutionary biology and genetics, he has also written two books that address myths and theories of race in American society. Graves has made appearances in six documentary films on these topics.

He has been a principal investigator on grants from the National Institute of Health, the National Science Foundation and the Arizona Disease Research Commission, and is a Fellow of the Council of the American Association for the Advancement of Science.

== Early life and education ==
Graves was born in 1955 and received his B.A. in biology from Oberlin College in 1977 and his PhD from Wayne State University in 1988.

Childhood experiences shaped Graves' interest in race and racism: "My parents were poor. They didn't know how to read. I had to teach myself how to read," he says. "The school system of my home was racially biased. When I was in kindergarten teachers wanted to declare me mentally retarded so that I could be placed in a special education curriculum. The regular curriculum had a tracking system," Graves continues. "For no apparent reason, all the black kids ended up in the lower track." But, by graduation day, years later, Graves had risen to be among the highest ranked students at his high school. He accepted an academic scholarship to attend Oberlin College and graduated from there with an B.A. in Biology in 1977. His next two years were spent at the Institute for Tropical Disease at the University of Lowell. He then earned a National Science Foundation Graduate Fellowship to begin his PhD work at the University of Michigan in 1979. He completed his PhD in Evolutionary, Environmental, and Systematic Biology at Wayne State University in 1988. This work afforded him the prestigious President's Postdoctoral Fellowship at the University of California, Irvine from 1988 to 1990. "Joseph L. Graves Jr. has since used his education to defy racial myths as he has been able to become an important and leading member in the in the field of evolutionary biology."

== Career ==
Graves joined the faculty at the University of California, Irvine in 1990. Afterward he held positions at the University of California, Irvine; at the West campus of Arizona State University, with a joint appointment in African American Studies at the main campus of Arizona State University in Tempe; and as University Core Director at Fairleigh Dickinson University, before finally receiving his joint appointment to North Carolina A & T State University and UNC Greensboro.

=== Research ===
Most Americans still believe that there is some biological legitimacy to our socially constructed racial categories. However, our modern scientific understanding of human genetic diversity flies in the face of all of our social stereotypes.

— Joseph L. Graves, Jr.

Working with Laurence D. Mueller, Graves found that population density is an important factor in determining both the immediate chances of survival and the course of natural selection for small organisms such as fruit flies. In "Chance, Development, and Aging", Human Biology December 2001, Graves wrote that the explanation of individual patterns of aging must take into account subtle mechanisms such as extensive chance variations in cell number and connections, in cell fates during differentiation, and in physiological patterns that arise during development. Graves has studied the tiny insects for more than a decade in pursuit of greater understanding of senescence, the process of aging.

In addition to the study of aging, Graves is interested in the history and philosophy of science as it relates to the biology of race and racism in western society. He has received a fair amount of attention from the press for his writings on this topic, especially his strong statements about the socially constructed nature of race. According to his profile on the University of North Carolina Minority Health Project website, he believes:

there are still significant academic and popular views of race that are mired in the biological determinism of the 19th century and the application of proper scientific method and philosophy, along with quantitative genetics reveals the underlying racist ideology of these programs.

== Personal life ==
Graves in his personal time enjoys playing Chess. He attributes this and much of his scientific interests to his time as a child watching Star Trek. In addition to his research interests, Graves has also been an active participant in the struggle to protect and improve the teaching of science in the public schools. He advocates discussing human biological variation and race in high school and college science curricula.

== Bibliography ==
- Graves, Joseph L. (2003). The Emperor's New Clothes: Biological Theories of Race at the Millennium. Rutgers University Press. ISBN 0-8135-2847-X. (February 2001)
- Graves, Joseph L. (2004). The Race Myth: Why We Pretend Race Exists in America (Re-print ed.). Plume. ISBN 0-452-28658-1. (June 28, 2005)
- Graves, Joseph L. (2022). A Voice in the Wilderness: A Pioneering Biologist Explains How Evolution Can Help Us Solve Our Biggest Problems. Basic Books. ISBN 978-1541600713. (June 2024)
- Graves, Joseph L. (2025). Why Black People Die Sooner: What Medicine Gets Wrong About Race and How to Fix It. Columbia Univ. Press. (November 2025)
- Graves, Joseph L. (2004). The Race Myth: Why We Pretend Race Exists in America. Dutton. (June 2004)
