= Norman Sauer =

American forensic anthropologist

Norman Jay Sauer
- Education: State University of New York at Geneseo, Michigan State University
- Awards: Fellow of the American Academy of Forensic Sciences, received their T. Dale Stewart Award in 2007
- Scientific career
- Fields: Forensic anthropology
- Workplaces: Michigan State University
- Thesis: An analysis of the human skeletal material from the Fletcher site (20by28), Bay City, Michigan (1974)

Norman J. Sauer is an American forensic anthropologist and professor emeritus of anthropology at Michigan State University (MSU).

== Education ==
Sauer received his undergraduate degree from the State University of New York at Geneseo and his Ph.D. from Michigan State University.

== Career ==
Sauer taught in the department of anthropology at MSU from 1974 to 2012. While at MSU, he co-directed their forensic anthropology track of the Forensic Science Program, and directed their Forensic Anthropology Laboratory. He retired from MSU in 2013. In 2015, he was named vice president of the American Academy of Forensic Sciences.

== Work and views ==
In the 2000s, Sauer identified a 200-year-old mummy that had previously been posted for sale on eBay as belonging to the University of Maryland School of Medicine. It was returned there in 2011. He has also analyzed the famous photograph V-J Day in Times Square and has concluded that the sailor depicted therein is George Mendonsa (who has claimed to be this sailor). He has argued that race is an invalid method of classifying humans.
