= Jeffrey C. Long =

American genetic anthropologist

Jeffrey Charles Long
- Education: University of Michigan, Ann Arbor
- Scientific career
- Fields: Genetic anthropology
- Workplaces: University of New Mexico
- Thesis: The estimation of genetic variation and divergence: Application to Gainj and Kalam speakers of Highland New Guinea (1984)

Jeffrey Charles Long is an American genetic anthropologist who has been a tenured professor in the department of anthropology at the University of New Mexico since 2009, and a professor in the department of biology there since 2013. Before joining the University of New Mexico, Long taught at the University of Michigan Medical School; Before that, he worked at the National Institute on Alcohol Abuse and Alcoholism. Long is a member of the American Society of Human Genetics. In April 2010, he presented a study at a meeting of the American Association of Physical Anthropologists which found evidence that early humans interbred with Neanderthals. He has also studied the relationship between race and genetics, with his collaborators on this topic including Kenneth M. Weiss and Rick Kittles.
