= Racial Culture: A Critique =

- Author: Richard T. Ford
- Genre: non-fiction
- Publisher: Princeton University Press
- Publication date: 2005
- Pages: 214
- ISBN: 0691119600
- OCLC: 54007242
- Dewey Decimal: 305.8/00973 22
- LC Class: HM1271 .F67 2005

Racial Culture: A Critique is a 2005 non-fiction book by American author and Stanford Law School professor Richard T. Ford which raises critical questions regarding the somewhat popular and common presumption of political multiculturalism that social categories emerge from as a result of distinctive cultural practices. Ford argues against legislation that prevents discrimination on the basis of cultural practices and details specific examples in support of this argument.

== Summary ==
This book looks at, analyzes, and raises questions regarding racial culture and cultural practices. It contributes to the understanding of the politics of race, particularly arguments promoting what Ford calls "rights-to-difference". He claims that these arguments, which "hold that a just society could and should prohibit discrimination on the basis of the cultural difference for the same reasons it should prohibit discrimination based on statuses such as race", are not only wrong but can have very negative social impacts.

=== Preamble ===
Ford's preamble is the introduction and the main reasoning of his critique on multiculturalism. He explains in the preamble that he intends to talk about the classifications of modern identity politics and multiculturalism which include ethnicity, sex, sexual orientation, and tribal membership. (Ford, 4) He states that the "simplest statement of my thesis in this regard to racism is different than social conflict arising as a result of cultural difference." (Ford, 7) He states three main points at the beginning of the chapter that include his opinions and what he hopes to achieve throughout the book and what he is going to talk about:

1) Support affirmative action, but worry about the effects of "diversity" justification for race conscious university admission as articulated by the Supreme Court in U. C Rogers v. Bakke and more recently in Grutter v. Bollinger. 2) Interrogate claims to cultural difference and often find such claims difficult to distinguish in principle or in practice from ideological differences, difference in taste or difference in opinions. 3) Central focus is on law and legal institutions. "I hope to uncover the effects of law-not only what the text of various laws and their advocates say the laws do, but also their unintended side effects, hidden messages and covert agendas." ( Ford, 2)

The ideology behind the book Racial Culture: A Critique was that Ford was originally going to name it Racial Culture: A Critique from the Left. The reason why he did not stay with this title was because he also wanted to use ideas from both sides rather than "go steady with one discrete set of influences." (Ford, 14) If someone had an idea then he would talk about it and base part of his argument off of it. Ford explains that, "Racial Cultures is generally suspicious of governmental intervention and insistent on the limits of civil rights and law generally. This I expect will fuel the sense that the book is conservative, or libertarian." ( Ford, 14)

=== Difference Discourse ===
The Difference Discourse chapter is all about cultural and racial difference. Ford starts the chapter off by telling a story of a black woman who sued American Airlines for a grooming policy. The policy prohibited employees in certain employment categories from wearing an all-braided hairstyle. The lady argued that it violated her rights under the Thirteenth Amendment. The woman alleged that the policy discriminated against her as a black woman. She said that the "cornrow" style has a special significance for black women. Ford stated that, "Although a right to cornrows might seem only to enhance the freedom of potential cornrow-wearers, it is arguably better understood as a policy of segregation through which a set of grooming styles are reserved for a particular group." (Ford, 26) In the end, the court denied the case.

The next story that Ford talks about is The TPG (The Parker Group). The TGP was a group during election and their job was to "get out the vote" for political candidates. They would call people and tell them to vote for a certain political candidate. However, 10% was race matched. This meant that there was a "black script" for blacks and a "white script" for whites. The rooms in the office were segregated. One room was for blacks and one room was for whites. Ford asked the question, "Is TGP's policy, as the court held, racially discriminatory because it is "based on a racial stereotype that blacks would respond to blacks and that... race was directly related to... ability to do the job?" (Ford, 27). This is an interesting question because it brings up the first topic of cultural and racial difference. Was it morally right to have race matched calling? An interesting definition for the word "difference" that Ford explains is that it, "Invites imprecise analogy: if the problem of the color line is the failure to appreciate and accommodate difference, then any unpopular out-of-the ordinary social group can claim to be victims of similar prejudice." (Ford, 28) This can relate to the TGP and the racial differences.

In the next section, Ford talks about the idea of multiculturalism and how it involves cultural differences and integrating different cultural practices. Ford describes multiculturalism with the example of designer jeans in the 1980s. Everybody thought this was a fad that wouldn't last very long. However, designer jeans morphed into designer chinos, designer T-shirts, designer windbreakers, designer polo shirts, and even more jeans. He said that, "Multiculturalism is no longer notable because it is everywhere."

An interesting story that he brings up in the book is the Bakke v. U.C. Regents case. Bakke applied and was denied admission to the University of California at Davis medical school. He found out that racial minorities who have received lower grades and lower test scores got admission to the school. He took this case to court and as Ford explains, "He changed modern Civil Rights." (Ford, 44) The court established a set law where there could not be point systems in schools. Diversity was a major factor for affirmative action at that time in the US. Bakke demonstrated that multiculturalism exists and diversity is a good thing, but it needs laws and guidelines which Bakke helped establish.

=== Identities as collective action ===
Ford tries to prove that identity, and a person's actions, shape who a person is. Ford talks about how a person's social performances are a direct correspondence to who he is and what society labels him as. The example given speaks of more aggressive and assertive women and how, if they want to do the tango, it would be easier to conform to the female role than try to take the problem head-on. If they face it head-on, their friends may tell them that if they want to get a guy that they should try being "nicer" and more "feminine". The men might shun her more and not ask her to dance. If the woman wants to dance she will conform to the structure of the dance. Eventually she will conform and it will become second nature. Then that new status will become her new identity.

Another point is on protective custody and how the law infringes on society and shapes the general views of the people. One of the examples that he gives talks about the Native Americans under the Civil Rights Act. A Pueblo woman married outside of her tribe, and challenged the tribal ordinance that prohibited the membership to the tribe, to a child born of a member and nonmember. The courts sided with the tribe on the basis of "tradition". Ford says that typically courts side with the tribal traditions even if they know that they clearly go against the Civil Rights Act. Thus the differences in culture only include those that are a patina of age.

His last point in this chapter is on identity consciousness and "less is more". Not that the law must be blind to all group differences but that the anti-discrimination law should focus more on the formal status hierarchies, to try to reduce the bad effects of those such hierarchies. Thus helping legal decisions to be more aware of the status differences and the caste-like social practices so they can correct their wrongdoings.

=== Cultural discrimination ===
Ford summarizes the points of the previous two chapters by stating that they detail some major arguments, the first of which is that the difference between groups is not inherent to the members of each group but develops as a result of the social practices of each group. The second claim he makes is that anti-discrimination law should not protect the traits of certain groups to prevent discrimination based on group statuses.

Virtually any social group who practices something controversial could claim that they are being discriminated against. Ford cites examples of cyclists, who have many run-ins with by motorists and pedestrians, considering they are a minority group in most cities. Some cyclists go so far as to make such confrontations between cyclists and motorists actionable as hate crimes. However, cyclists are not attacked because of some widespread prejudice against them and therefore should not be treated the same as groups such as racial minorities and homosexuals. The reason for their conflicts is psychological and practical, and has to do with resources (the city streets) rather than discrimination.

As the world and America become more modern and cosmopolitan, culture seems to follow along the same path. All of a sudden, the question is raised regarding "a legal right to a specific lifestyle, to social esteem, to a meaningful life" (Ford, 133). Ford cites David Rieff when discussing the marketing of multiculturalism, who compares the consumption of culture to the consumption of goods. With this comparison in mind, Ford draws the conclusion that social justice is becoming the "right to purchase mass produced quirkiness and canned authenticity and the freedom to buy assembly line individuality and niche-marketed group consciousness" (Ford, 134).

Ford summarizes this chapter by stating that discrimination based on "race, color, and sex, as well as disability and... sexual orientation raises distinctive concerns because it participates in the production or socially inferior classes of people, groups of permanently lower social status, interior castes" (Ford, 138). This discrimination is based on widespread social prejudice against such groups. The difference between such groups and the cyclists is the difference between "Minorities" and "minorities". Discrimination against a stigmatized group would be what Ford would dub discrimination against a "Minority" as opposed to discrimination on other bases, which is usually much less regular (discrimination against a "minority").

=== The ends of anti-discrimination law ===
What Ford describes as "cultural bias" is unavoidable, and therefore only when protection is extremely vital should legislation be imposed in order to prevent it. The fact is that laws seem to be inevitably discriminatory, at least to some degree. Because different social groups have different standards and practices, laws which oppose the more objectionable of these "do not necessarily reflect prejudice or bias against the group as a group—instead it reflects disapproval of the practice in which the group engages" (Ford, 131).

The practice of certain institutions of prohibiting or forbidding unconventional styles or practices is not necessarily discrimination and should therefore not be treated as such, nor should it be submitted to the same legal scrutiny as legitimate discrimination. They may put in place such policies in order to either develop an image of conservatism, traditionalism, and stability, or they may desire to present a consistent and uniform image that would be damaged by blatant expressions of individualism. As Ford puts it, "if an institution is required to accommodate the cultural styles and norms of its employees or enrollees, it is prohibited from making adherence to an institutional style or norm a requirement of membership" (Ford, 143).

Considering all of these factors, anti-discrimination law should be crafted and designed very carefully in order to take into account all of detrimental effects it could have on institutions and the way they are organized to function. Ford states "anti-discrimination law typically prohibits discrimination directly by outlawing explicit and intentional discrimination, and indirectly by scrutinizing policies that have a disparate impact on the groups that the statue protects from discrimination" (Ford, 147-148). Anti-discrimination law should not mandate "fairness". It does not function to do so and would not be performing its intended purpose if such was the case.

== Further resources ==
Reviews
Princeton University Press
http://press.princeton.edu/titles/7866.html#reviews

=== Interviews ===
- A New Face for America. Minnesota Public Radio Midmorning Show. http://podcastdownload.npr.org/anon.npr-podcasts/podcast/111/510180/93851781/MPR_93851781.mp3
- Kymlicka, Will (2008-06-08). Will Kymlicka on Minority Rights (with transcript) (mp3). Philosophy Bites (podcast). Episode #61. Interviewed by Warburton, Nigel.
- Phillips, Anne (2007-07-03). Anne Phillips on Multiculturalism (with transcript) (mp3). Philosophy Bites (podcast). Episode #8. Interviewed by Warburton, Nigel.
- Interview with Kwame Anthony Appiah on Cosmopolitanism http://traffic.libsyn.com/philosophybites/Appiah1MixSes.MP3
- Sniderman, P. (2007) When Ways Collide. Talk at RSA (London) http://coblitz.codeen.org/uc.princeton.edu/main/images/stories/podcast/20070827PaulSnidermanRSA.mp3

=== Further reading ===
- Phillips, A. (2007) Multiculturalism Without Culture. http://press.princeton.edu/chapters/i8418.html
- Talk at RSA (London) http://coblitz.codeen.org/uc.princeton.edu/main/images/stories/podcast/20070731AnnePhillipsRSA.mp3
- Sailer, S. (2007) Fragmented Future. The American Conservative. http://www.amconmag.com/article/2007/jan/15/00007/
- Malik, K. (2008) Against Multiculturalism. http://www.kenanmalik.com/essays/against_mc.html
- Jimenez, M. (2008) Does Multiculturalism Lead to Ethnic Fragmentation. https://www.theglobeandmail.com/servlet/story/RTGAM.20070208.wculture08/BNStory/National/home/
