= Katya Gibel Mevorach =

American anthropologist

Katya Gibel Mevorach (born 18 June 1952) is Professor of Anthropology and American Studies at Grinnell College. Under the name Katya Gibel Azoulay, she is author of an explication and theory of identities, Black, Jewish and Interracial: It's Not the Color of Your Skin but the Race of Your Kin, and Other Myths of Identity.

== Life and career ==
Mevorach was born to Inge Gibel (Miriam Lederer) and Ronald L.X. Gibel in New York City, New York. Her mother is Jewish and her father is Jamaican. She is an alumna of The Brearley School in New York and received a B.A. and M.A. in African Studies from Hebrew University of Jerusalem in Israel, where she lived between 1970 and 1991. In 1991 she returned to the United States. Four years later, Mevorach earned a PhD in Cultural Anthropology from Duke University. In January 1996, she was invited to Grinnell College as a Scholar-in-Residence and joined as an assistant professor the following year. She served as Chair of the Africana Studies Concentration from 1996 to 2000 and in 2003 helped initiate the transition of Africana Studies into an expanded American Studies Concentration, serving as the new chair between 2004 and 2005. Mevorach also served on the Grinnell College Diversity Steering Committee between 2002 and 2005.

Mevorach is married to Paris-based visual artist and filmmaker, Yorame Mevorach. She has three adult children from a previous marriage.

== Bibliography ==
=== Books ===
- Black, Jewish and Interracial: It's Not the Color of Your Skin but the Race of Your Kin and Other Myths of Identity. [Honorable Mention for Outstanding Book Awards for books published in 1997 by The Gustavus Meyers Center for the Study of Bigotry and Human Rights in North America, Boston University School of Social Work]

=== Chapters ===
- "When Words Have Failed and Political Rhetoric Turns Stale: Race, Racism and Caste."
- "Reflections on 'Race' and the Biologization of Difference".
- "Interpreting the Census: The Elasticity of Whiteness and the Depoliticization of Race".
- "Jewish Identity and the Politics of a (Multi)Racial Category".
- "Personal Landmarks on Pedagogical Landscapes".
