= Charmaine Royal =

American geneticist and bioethicist

- Born: Jamaica
- Education: Howard University (BS, MS, PhD)
- Awards: Thomas Langford Lectureship Award Duke University (2013); Greenwall Faculty Scholar in Bioethics Duke University (2009)
- Scientific career
- Workplaces: Duke University; Howard University; National Institutes of Health
- Thesis: [Link] Coping strategies in families of children with Sickle Cell Disease] (1997)
- Website: Duke website

Charmaine DM Royal is a Jamaican-American geneticist and is the Robert O. Keohane Professor of African & African American Studies, Biology, Global Health, and Family Medicine & Community Health at Duke University. She studies the intersections of race, ethnicity, ancestry genetics, and health, especially as they pertain to historically marginalized and underrepresented groups in genetic and genomic research; and genomics and global health. Her major interest is in addressing root causes and implementing sustainable solutions regarding problems of race and racism in research, healthcare, and society. Royal is a Human Heredity and Health in Africa (H3Africa) Independent Expert Committee (IEC) member appointed by the National Institutes of Health (NIH) and is a 2020 Ida Cordelia Beam Distinguished Visiting Professor at the University of Iowa.

== Early life and education ==
Royal earned her bachelor's degree in microbiology, master's degree in genetic counseling in 1992, and doctorate in human genetics from Howard University in 1997. She completed her postgraduate training in bioethics and ethical, legal, and social implications (ELSI) research at the National Human Genome Research Institute (NHGRI) of the NIH, as well as training in behavioral medicine and epidemiology at the Howard University Cancer Center.

== Research and career ==
Royal investigates race, racism, genetics and health disparities, within the United States and globally. While at the National Human Genome Center at Howard University, Royal was a member of the International HapMap Project and worked alongside Charles Rotimi of H3Africa. Her research focused on the genetics and health of African Americans, and ethical implications of African American genealogical study.

== Academic service ==
During her time at Duke University, Royal has served as an Associate Professor of African & African American Studies, Family Medicine & Community Health, Global Health, and Biology. In addition, she is core faculty in the Duke Initiative for Science & Society, faculty in the Social Science Research Institute where she directs the Center for Truth, Racial Healing & Transformation, and the Center on Genomics, Race, Identity, Difference. Royal is also a senior fellow at the Kenan Institute for Ethics, a 2020 Ida Cordelia Beam Distinguished Visiting Professor at the University of Iowa, an ad hoc member of the Jackson Heart Study Community Ethics Advisory Board, and a contributing member of the 1000 Genomes Project Consortium. She also serves on the Ethics Advisory Board at Illumina, Inc.

=== Awards and honors ===
- 2009 Duke University Greenwall Faculty Scholar in Bioethics
- 2013 Duke University Thomas Langford Lectureship Award

== Select papers ==
- Peprah, Emmanuel; Xu, Huichun; Tekola-Ayele, Fasil; Royal, Charmaine M (2015). "Genome-Wide Association Studies in Africans and African Americans: Expanding the Framework of the Genomics of Human Traits and Disease". Public Health Genomics. 18 (1): 40–51. doi:10.1159/000367962. ISSN 1662-4246. PMC 4418477. PMID 25427668.
- Auton, Adam; et al. (2015). "A global reference for human genetic variation". Nature. 526 (7571): 68–74. Bibcode:2015Natur.526...68T. doi:10.1038/nature15393. PMC 4750478. PMID 26432245.
- Royal, Charmaine DM; Dunston, Georgia M (2004). "Changing the paradigm from 'race' to human genome variation". Nature Genetics. 36 (11 Suppl): S5–S7. doi:10.1038/ng1454. PMID 15508004. S2CID 205344090.
- Blanchard, Jessica W.; Outram, Simon; Tallbull, Gloria; Royal, Charmaine D. M. (2019). "'We Don't Need a Swab in Our Mouth to Prove Who We Are' Identity, Resistance, and Adaptation of Genetic Ancestry Testing among Native American Communities". Current Anthropology. 60 (5): 637–655. doi:10.1086/705483. PMC 7837598. PMID 33505045. S2CID 202265594.
