= Sarah S. Richardson =

Professor of history of science and gender studies

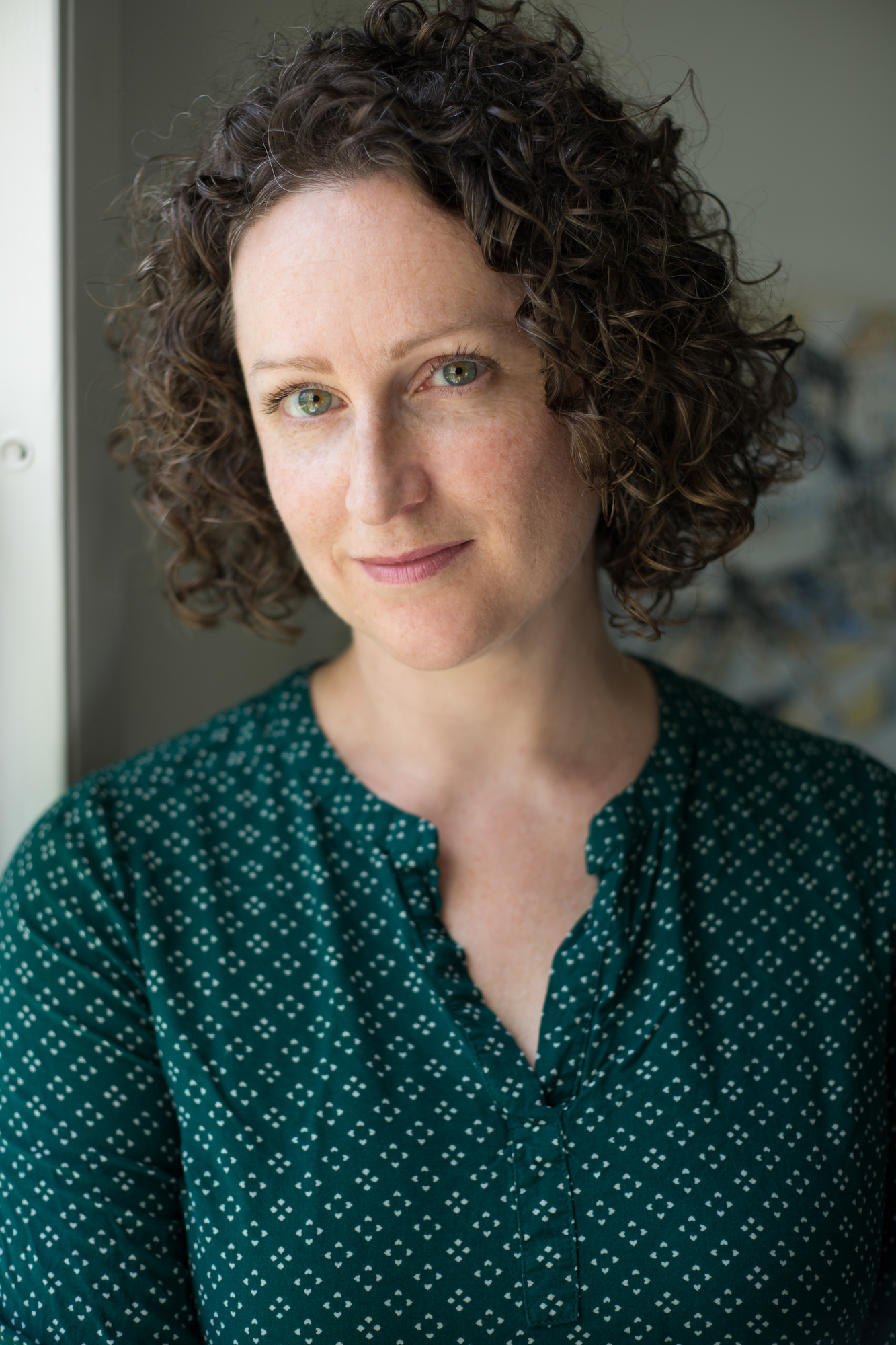
- Richardson in 2021
- Title: Professor of the History of Science & Studies of Women, Gender, and Sexuality
- Awards: Adele E. Clarke Book Award (2024)

Academic background
- Education: Columbia University (BA); Stanford University (PhD)
- Thesis: Gendering the Genome: Sex Chromosomes in Twentieth Century Genetics (2009)
- Doctoral advisor: Helen Longino

Academic work
- Discipline: Philosopher and Historian of Science
- Sub-discipline: Feminist Science Studies, Science of Sex
- Notable works: The Maternal Imprint: The Contested Science of Maternal-Fetal Effects; Sex Itself: The Search for Male and Female in the Human Genome
- Website: https://scholar.harvard.edu/srichard

Sarah S. Richardson is an American philosopher and historian who is a professor at the Department of the History of Science at Harvard University. She is the author of The Maternal Imprint: The Contested Science of Maternal-Fetal Effects and Sex Itself: The Search for Male and Female in the Human Genome.

== Career ==
Richardson earned her B.A. in philosophy from Columbia University in 2002, and her Ph.D. from Stanford University in 2009. She was the Five College Assistant Professor of Feminist Science Studies at the University of Massachusetts Amherst from 2009 until 2010. In 2010 she would join the faculty of Harvard University, where she has remained since, earning tenure in 2017.

== Research ==
Richardson is a historian and philosopher of science, and her research and scholastic work has largely centered on feminist science studies as well as more general intersections of gender and science. Her 2013 book Sex Itself, examined cultural norms around gender.

== Selected publications ==
- Revisiting race in a genomic age. Barbara A. Koenig, Sandra Soo-Jin Lee, Sarah S. Richardson. New Brunswick, N.J.: Rutgers University Press. 2008. ISBN 978-0-8135-4323-9. OCLC 173299300.
- Richardson, Sarah S. (2013), "Sex Itself", Sex Itself: The Search for Male and Female in the Human Genome, University of Chicago Press, pp. 1–22, doi:10.7208/chicago/9780226084718.003.0001, ISBN 978-0-226-32561-3
- Richardson, Sarah S.; Daniels, Cynthia R.; Gillman, Matthew W.; Golden, Janet; Kukla, Rebecca; Kuzawa, Christopher; Rich-Edwards, Janet (2014). "Society: Don't blame the mothers". Nature. 512 (7513): 131–132. Bibcode:2014Natur.512..131R. doi:10.1038/512131a. ISSN 0028-0836. PMID 25119222.
- Richardson, Sarah S.; Reiches, Meredith; Shattuck-Heidorn, Heather; LaBonte, Michelle Lynne; Consoli, Theresa (2015-11-03). "Focus on preclinical sex differences will not address women's and men's health disparities". Proceedings of the National Academy of Sciences. 112 (44): 13419–13420. doi:10.1073/pnas.1516958112. ISSN 0027-8424. PMC 4640753. PMID 26534989.
- Richardson, Sarah S.; Stevens, Hallam, eds. (2015). Postgenomics: Perspectives on biology after the genome. Duke University Press. ISBN 978-0-8223-7544-9. OCLC 1186332435.
- Richardson, Sarah S. (2021). The maternal imprint : the contested science of maternal-fetal effects. Chicago. ISBN 978-0-226-54477-9. OCLC 1240772044.
