= National essentialism =

Japanese anti-Westernisation ideology

National essentialism (国粋主義 or 国粋保存主義), in Japanese pronunciation as Kokusui Shugi or Kokusui Hozon Shugi is one of the terms used to describe Japanese nationalism. Terms similar to kokusui shugi include kokka shugi (国家主義; lit. 'state nationalism') and minzoku shugi (民族主義; lit. 'ethnic nationalism'). Kokusui shugi is also viewed as a proto-fascism.

Kokusui shugi emphasizes the uniqueness of Japanese culture and tradition against Europeanisationism (欧化主義) and pursues conservatism; Nihon shugi (日本主義; lit. 'Japanese consciousness or Japanism') is used in a similar sense.

== History ==
Kokusui shugi was based on Sonnō jōi, which emerged before the end of the Edo Shogunate. After the Meiji Restoration, it appeared as a reaction to the Europeanization policy pursued by the Empire of Japan government; at that time, the Japan's government was promoting Japan's modernization through the active introduction of Western culture.

The term "Kokusui shugi" appears in the Japanese newspaper 『日本人』, which was founded in 1888 in Seikyōsha, where Shiga Shigetaka and Miyake Setsurei belonged; they opposed the Japanese government's Europeanization policy at the time.

Unlike the early kokusui shugi, in the middle of the Meiji era, the kokusui shugi ideology embraces Europeanization while preserving the traditional culture and lifestyle of Japan in order to develop Japanese civilization independently.

Kokusui shugi served as a right-wing principle of action in favor of traditions or the state system and opposed the socialist mass movement; from the events of Manchuria in the early Shōwa era to the Second Sino-Japanese War, it also transformed into the ultra-nationalist ideology of the Historical Vision of Imperial Japan.

As such, the Kokusui shugi ideology is consistent in that it is a kokutai theory that insists on the permanence of the Tennō-central system, which has never been cut off from bloodline, while changing with the times.

== See also ==
- Kokusui-kai
- Nippon Kaigi
- Ultranationalism (Japan) – 国粋主義 is sometimes translated as "ultranationalism".
- Uyoku dantai
