= Datsu-A Ron =

Essay by Fukuzawa Yukichi in 1885

"Datsu-A Ron" (Japanese Kyūjitai: 脫亞論, Shinjitai: 脱亜論) was an editorial published in the Japanese newspaper Jiji Shimpo on March 16, 1885, arguing that Meiji Japan should abandon the "conservative governments" of Qing China and Joseon Korea and align itself with the West. The title "Datsu-A Ron" has been translated in a variety of ways, including "Goodbye Asia" and "Leaving Asia".

As such an idea was controversial at the time, it was written anonymously to avoid possible backlash, probably by author and educator Fukuzawa Yukichi. (The editorial was included in the second volume of Fukuzawa's complete works in 1933.) Even so, the editorial was generally ignored and did not attract any comment upon its publication.

In 1996, historian Shinya Ida used forensic linguistic methods to analyze "Datsu-A Ron" and concluded the writer was likely either Yoshio Takahashi or Fukuzawa.

== Abstract ==
The article first declares that the "wind of westernization" is blowing through the region and that countries can either accommodate it and "taste the fruit of civilization" or be left without a choice in their own destiny. "Civilization is like the measles", it continues, "and it is better than the measles that it can bring interests". It sees the conservative Tokugawa shogunate as having impeded this road to "civilization" and self-determination, and argues that its overthrow was necessary to get rid of the old and gain the new. In this way, the author sees Japan during the Meiji Restoration as spiritually "leaving Asia," since its two closest neighbors, China and Korea, do not appear to be embracing such reformation. Unless there are pioneers to reform these countries, they would be conquered and divided by external forces, as shown by the unequal treaties and threat of force pushed on Asian countries by the United States and other Western powers.

A key passage reads:

- Once the wind of Western civilization blows to the East, every blade of grass and every tree in the East follow what the Western wind brings.
- The spread of civilization is like the measles.
- In my view, these two countries [China and Korea] cannot survive as independent nations with the onslaught of Western civilization to the East.
- It is not different from the case of the righteous man living in a neighborhood of a town known for foolishness, lawlessness, atrocity, and heartlessness. His action is so rare that it is always buried under the ugliness of his neighbors' activities.
- We do not have time to wait for the enlightenment of our neighbors so that we can work together toward the development of Asia. It is better for us to leave the ranks of Asian nations and cast our lot with civilized nations of the West. Those [who] are intimate with bad friends are also regarded as bad, therefore I will deny those bad Asian friends from my heart.

== Historical background ==
"Datsu-A Ron" has been said to be Fukuzawa's response to a failed attempt by Koreans to organize an effective reform faction, an attempt he had supported. He had invited young Korean aristocrats to his school. He supported Yu Giljun who is the first foreign student of Korea, and one of his disciples, Kim Okgyun, attempted a coup d'état in 1884 but failed. These failures pushed Fukuzawa to develop his "leaving Asia" ideology. Nevertheless, the assistance provided to radical Koreans during this era was generally not intended to lead to complete independence for the peninsula, but rather sought to expand Japanese influence in Korea even further. This culminated in the cynical power-plays undertaken in Korea by Koreans supported by Fukuzawa and by the Japanese Imperial Army during the First Sino-Japanese War.

Fukuzawa's enthusiastic support of the war had much to do with his opinions about modernization. Like many of his peers in the government, Fukuzawa ultimately believed modernization in Asia could best be achieved at the point of a gun. He believed that China suffered from archaic and unchanging principles. At the time of the war, foot binding was still a common practice in China, opium usage was widespread, and the Qing government was failing to fend off exploitative foreign incursions. Railroads and taxation were sold to pay debt. Japan, similarly, suffered the humiliation of having to endure unequal treaties with the Western powers, and Fukuzawa hoped a display of military prowess would sway opinion in the West towards treaty revision. In his hopes for a strong Japan, Fukuzawa saw the Asian countries around Japan as potential deterrents in need of guidance.

== Legacy ==
In 2004, Yo Hirayama researched the intellectual legacy of the article, and concluded that was effectively forgotten from its publication in 1885 until the 1950s, when it started to be cited as an example of Japanese militarism during the Meiji period.

"Datsu-A Ron" did not attract any comment upon its publication in 1885. Hirayama found no references to it in Jiji Shinpo after March 16, 1885 or in Tokyo Yokohama Mainichi Shinbun, Yubin Houchi Shinbun, or Choya Shinbun between March 17 and March 27, and concluded that it was effectively forgotten for the next 48 years. In July 1933, Keio Gijyuku included the editorial in volume 2 of Zoku-Fukuzawa Zenshū (続福澤全集, "The Continued Complete Works of Fukuzawa"). Since then, Fukuzawa has been considered to be the writer. No further comment occurred from 1933 to 1951.

During the 1950s and 1960s, it was cited in a number of books and articles:

1. Shigeki Tōyama (November 1951), Nisshin-sensō to Fukuzawa Yukichi (日清戦争と福沢諭吉, "The Sino-Japanese War and Yukuchi Fukuzawa")
2. Shiso Hattori (May 1952), Toyo-ni-okeru Nihon-no ichi (東洋における日本の位置, "The position of Japan in Asia")
3. Shiso Hattori (August 1953), Bunmei-kaika (文明開化, "The civilization")
4. Masanao Kano (June 1956), Nihon Kindai-Shiso-no Keisei (日本近代思想の形成, "The formation of Japanese modern ideas")
5. Koji Iizuka (July 1960) Ajia-no-nakano Nihon (アジアのなかの日本, "Japan in Asia")
6. Yoshitake Oka (June 1961), Kokuminteki dokuritsu-to Kokkarisei (国民的独立と国家理性, "National independence and state reason")
7. Yoshimi Takeuchi (June 1961), Nihon-to Ajia (日本とアジア, "Japan and Asia")

It was also republished in full in Takeuchi (August 1963), Gendai-Nihon Shiso Taikei (現代日本思想大系, "The survey of current Japanese ideas") and Masafumi Tomita, Shun-ichi Tsuchihashi ed. (June 1960), Fukuzawa Yukichi Zensyu (福澤諭吉全集, "The Complete Works of Yukichi Fukuzawa"), vol. 10.

Then, in 1967, two popular paperbacks were published which commented on "Datsu-A Ron", namely Fukuzawa Yukichi—Ikitsuzukeru Shisoka (福沢諭吉—生きつづける思想家, "Yukichi Fukuzawa--Living Theorist") by Kenji Kono and Fukuzawa Yukichi (福沢諭吉, "Yukichi Fukuzawa") by Masanao Kano. These made the editorial notorious in Japan as an example of Japanese militarism.

In March 1981, Junji Banno published the new interpretation of "Datsu-A Ron" in the commentary of Fukuzawa Yukichi Sensyu (福沢諭吉選集, "Selected works of Yukichi Fukuzawa") vol.7, ISBN 4-00-100677-4, suggesting it was addressing the failure of Koreans to organize an effective political reform faction.

== See also ==
- Ōka shugi

== English translations ==
- Sinh Vinh (October 1984). "On departure from Asia: Datuaron". Fukuzawa Yukichi Nenkan. 11. Tokyo: Fukuzawa Yukichi Kyokai. Archived from the original on 2020-07-01.
- David John Lu, ed. (November 1996). "Good-bye Asia (1885)". Japan: a documentary history : The Late Tokugawa Period to the Present. Armonk, New York: M.E. Sharpe. pp. 351–353. ISBN 0-7656-0036-6.
