= Ōka shugi =

Japanese trend of modernizing through Europeanisation

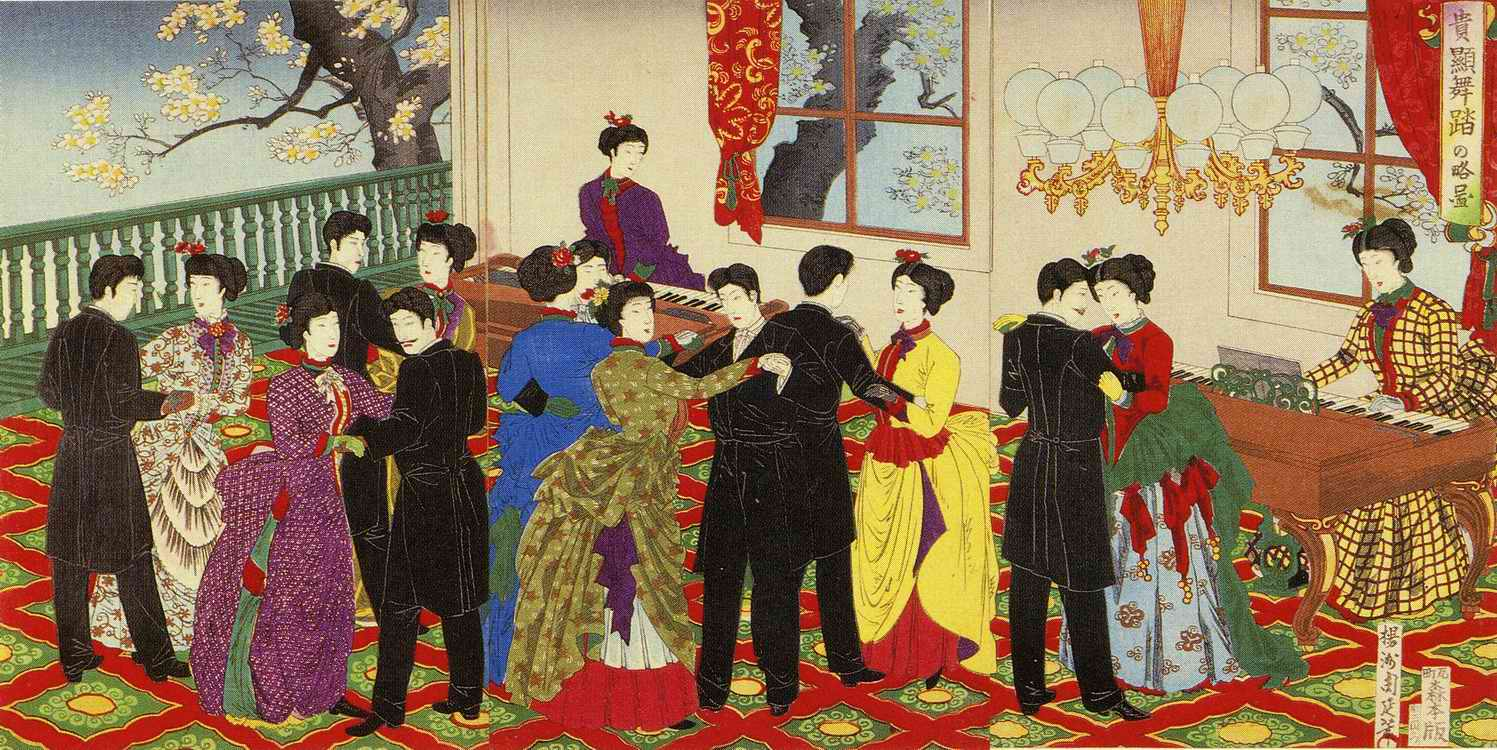
A Western-style ball was held in Rokumeikan.

Ōka shugi (欧化主義; lit. 'Europeanisationism') is a trend or ideology in Japan that seeks to introduce various European institutions or cultures to advance modernization.

== Description ==
This policy was adopted by the Meiji government in the 1880s to acknowledge the modernization of Japan in the European and American empires by using culture, institutions, customs, and customs as European styles. Ōka shugi policy was also intended to revise the unequal treaties signed by Japan with Western powers, including Ansei Treaties, and by making Japan's politics and culture European, Japan was recognized as a member of 'civilized countries' subject to international law. During the Meiji era, the two ideologies Oka shugi and Kokusui shugi were at odds culturally.

== See also ==
- Datsu-A Ron
- Europeanisation
- Freedom and People's Rights Movement
- Meiji Restoration
  - Meiji Constitution
- National essentialism – During the Meiji era, the two ideologies Oka shugi and Kokusui shugi were at odds culturally.
