= Meiji Restoration =

1868 return to imperial rule in Japan

- Part of the end of the Edo period
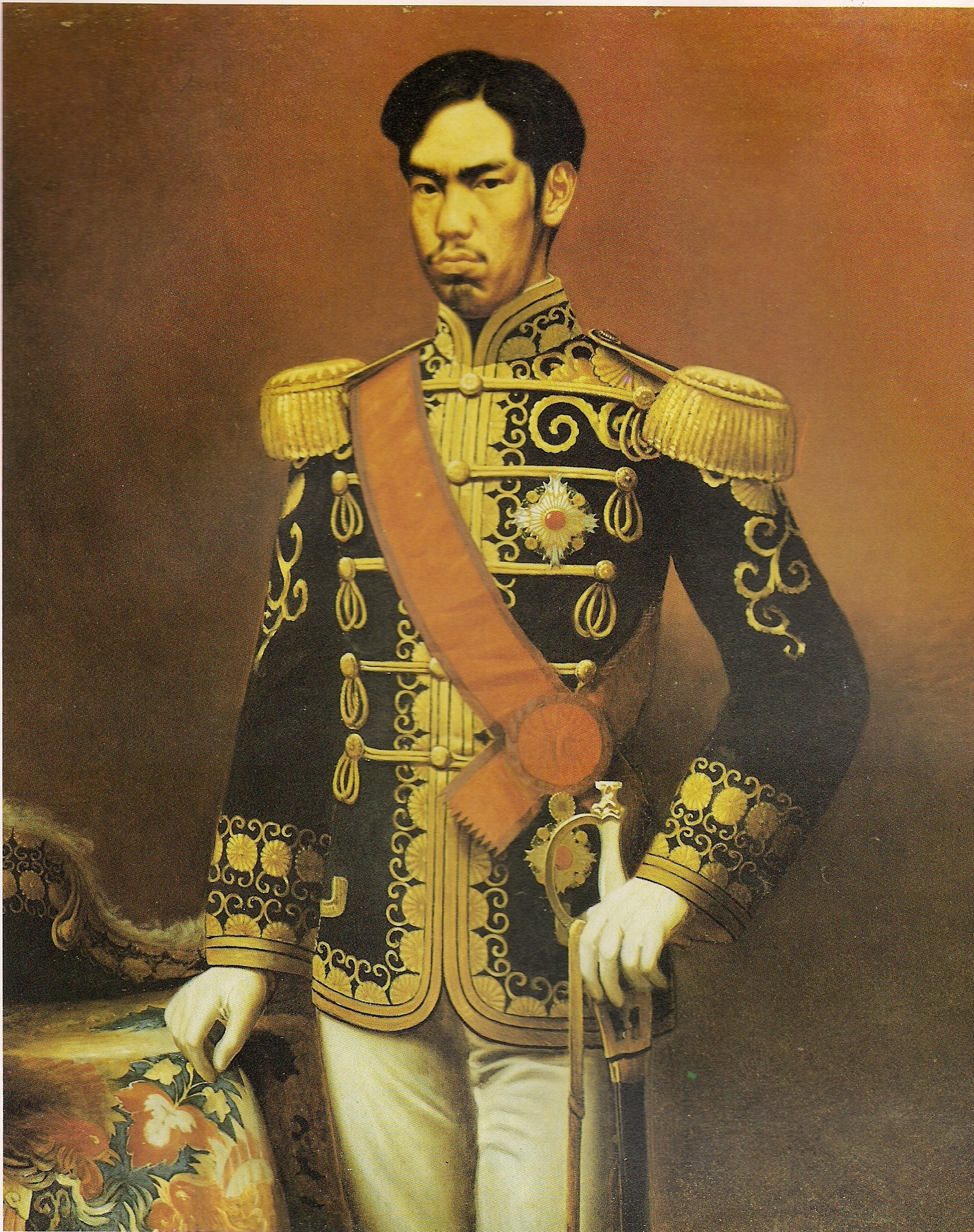
- Portrait of Emperor Meiji in 1880
- Native name: 明治維新 (Meiji Ishin)
- Date: 3 January 1868
- Location: Japan
- Outcome: Overthrow of the Tokugawa shogunate; Establishment of the Empire of Japan; Industrialisation and the abolition of feudalism; Dissolution of the domain system and samurai class

The Meiji Restoration (明治維新, Meiji Ishin (Note: Japanese pronunciation: [mei.(d)ʑi iꜜ.ɕiɴ, meː-]); also translated as the Meiji Reformation] (Note: also variously: Meiji Renovation, Meiji Renewal, Meiji Revolution, or Meiji Regeneration)), referred to at the time as the Honorable Restoration (御維新／御一新, Goi(s)shin), was a political event that restored the Emperor of Japan's executive power in Japan in 1868 under Emperor Meiji and led to the Westernisation of Japan. Although there were ruling emperors before the Meiji Restoration, the events restored practical power to, and consolidated the political system under, the Emperor of Japan. (Note: Although the political system was consolidated under the Emperor, power was mainly transferred to a group of people, known as the Meiji oligarchy (and Genrō).) The Restoration led to enormous changes in Japan's political and social structure and spanned both the late Edo period (often called the Bakumatsu) and the beginning of the Meiji era, during which time Japan rapidly industrialised and adopted Western ideas, production methods and technology.

The origins of the Restoration lay in economic and political difficulties faced by the Tokugawa shogunate. These problems were compounded by the encroachment of foreign powers in the region, which challenged the Tokugawa policy of sakoku; specifically, the arrival of the Perry Expedition under orders from United States president Millard Fillmore. Under subsequent unequal treaties, Japan was forced to open to the West, bringing the shōgun's ability to maintain Japanese sovereignty into question. The Emperor's rebuke of shogunal actions led to the emergence of an ideological divide within the samurai class concerned with their feudal obligations to both the shōgun and the Emperor. Many lower and middle-ranking samurai became shishi ("men of spirit") who were committed to the Emperor's proclamations to expel the barbarians. Factional disputes within the domains led some domains to conflict with the Tokugawa. After some initial setbacks, the domains organised into an anti-Tokugawa alliance, and, led by Satsuma and Chōshū, they overthrew the shogunal system.

On 3 January 1868, Emperor Meiji declared political power to be restored to the Imperial House. The goals of the restored government were expressed by the new emperor in the Charter Oath. Subsequent Tokugawa resistance to the new government materialised in the Boshin War and the short-lived Republic of Ezo, but by the 1870s, the Emperor's authority was practically unquestioned. The new government reorganised whole strata of society, abolishing the old currency, the domain system, and eventually the class position of the samurai.

The abolition of the shogunate and industrialisation of society in emulation of foreign imperial powers led to backlash with the Saga Rebellion and the Satsuma Rebellion, but ultimately ended feudalism in Japanese society. The Meiji Restoration was the political process that laid the foundation for the institutions of the Empire of Japan, and would have far-reaching consequences in East Asia as Japan pursued colonial interests against its neighbours. The Meiji Constitution of 1889 would remain in place until the Allied occupation of Japan after the end of World War II.

== Background ==
=== Political and social structure ===
In the Edo period, Japan was governed by a strict and rigid social order with inherited position. This hierarchy in descending order had the Emperor and their Court at the top. The shōgun, with the rōjū and daimyō below him inhabited the upper strata of society. Below them were various subdivisions of samurai, farmers, artisans, and merchants. Historian Marius B. Jansen refers to the political organisation of the system as being one of "feudal autonomy". This was a structure of government where the shōgun granted extensive control to the various daimyō over their own domains to control their own jurisdiction while paying homage to him through irregular taxation, the seeking of permission for marriage and movement, and systems such as that of alternate attendance. The total population of samurai families in the 19th century numbered around 5–6% of 30 million people (1,500,000–1,800,000), among these families, roughly 1 in 50 was an "upper samurai" while the rest were divided mostly evenly between "middle" and "lower" samurai, with each division containing more subdivisions.

The influence exerted by the Tokugawa shogunate (bakufu) in contemporary Japan was built on the distribution and management of land. Split into domains, each domain was measured by koku, or the amount of rice a given area of land could produce per annum. By 1650, the shōgun directly controlled land producing roughly 4.2 million koku of rice, with his direct retainers, other members of the Tokugawa family (shinpan daimyō), and his vassals (fudai daimyō) controlling a combined total of land producing 12.9 million koku out of a national 26 million koku. The remaining 9.8 million koku (just under 38%) was parceled out between about 100 rival tozama daimyō, the descendants of those who had fought against the Tokugawa at the Battle of Sekigahara. Many of the strongest tozama domains were located in western Japan away from centres of power, with the fudai often controlling government offices, but with smaller provinces to incentivize them to preserve the system.

According to the Neo-Confucian tenets of bakufu authority, the system of hierarchy developed in bushidō encouraged a series of descending subordinations, but unlike in China, its adoption by the bakufu came to inform an ethic that was distinct from the structural organisation of the Tokugawa state; this allowed it to coexist with Western scientific methods. Historian William G. Beasley argues that there was a tension between this official state ideology that encouraged enlightened meritocratic rule and the rigid class structure that prevented the lower and middle ranking samurai bureaucrats from advancing their position. When exacerbated by foreign and domestic crises, and in spite of official attempts to begin promoting samurai to offices beyond their inherited position, the social bonds between these systems weakened, leading to reformist and revolutionary attitudes among the samurai. Merchant classes, that had been flourishing economically in developing mass culture and communication, were forbidden to translate their influence into political power.

=== Ideological currents ===
Beginning especially in the last quarter of the 18th century, a kind of Shintō revival was occurring alongside a growing interest in Dutch studies. Both schools occurred as part of a turn away from China as the centre of intellectual thought. But adherents to both movements were careful not to assert that their learning was in any way meant to upset the established political order. The work of the Mito School working primarily from the Kōdōkan, was especially important in the development of nativist concepts connected to kokugaku (national learning).

There were limits. When Hirata Atsutane went too far for the bakufu in reviving the political claims the Emperor held, he was silenced. Still, the development of national learning continued in the Mito School, with the use of the term fukoku kyōhei (rich nation, strong army) to describe the solution to domestic and foreign threats applied by the scholar Fujita Yūkoku. Fujita's son, Fujita Tōko, writing in the wake of news of British victory in the First Opium War insisted that a desirable position for Japan to take would be jōi (repelling the barbarian) to be followed with kaikoku, an opening of the country on equal footing. When faced with the immediate danger the foreign threat possessed, the work of kokugaku scholars led to an evaluation of what was national, which focused attention on the Emperor and Shintō.

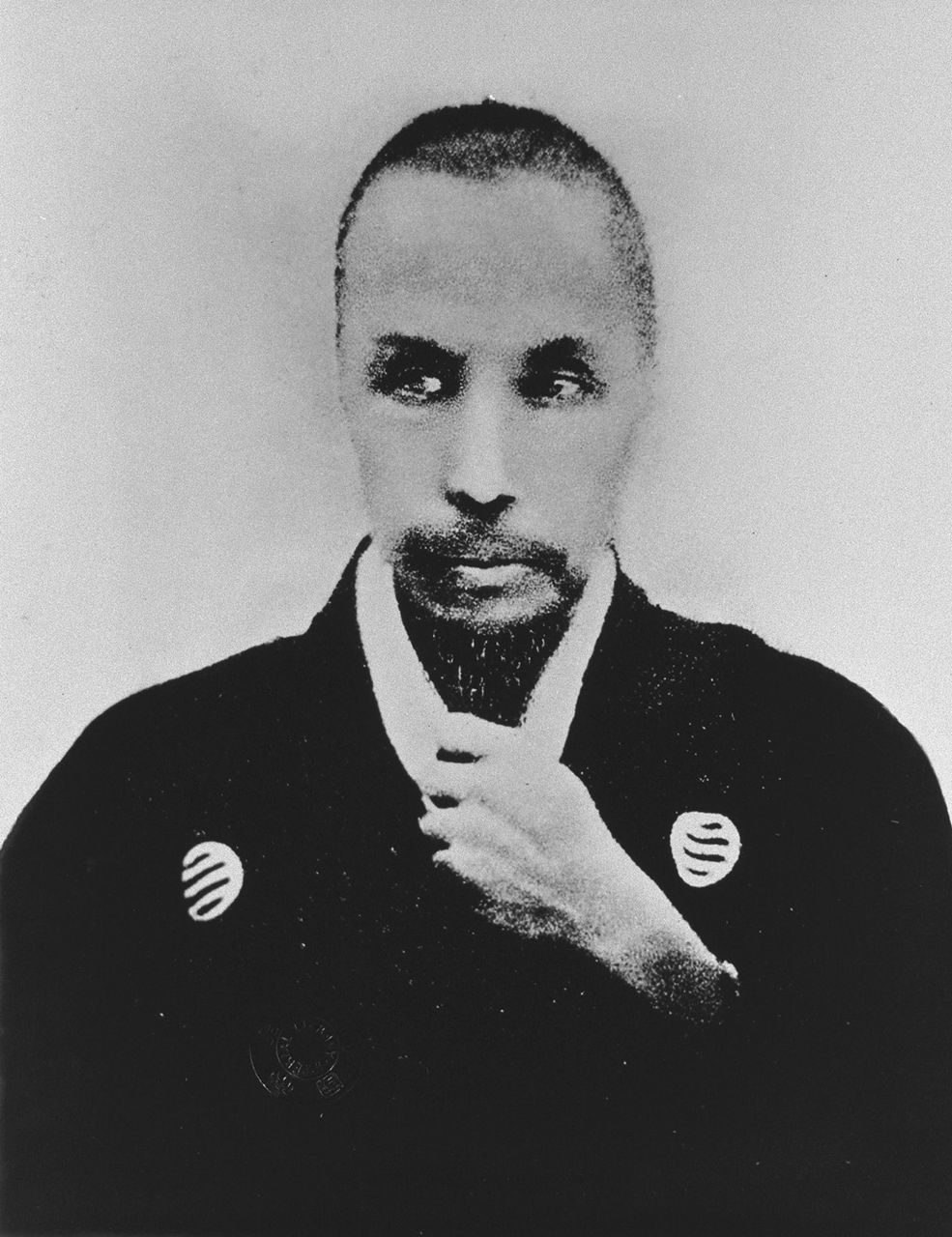
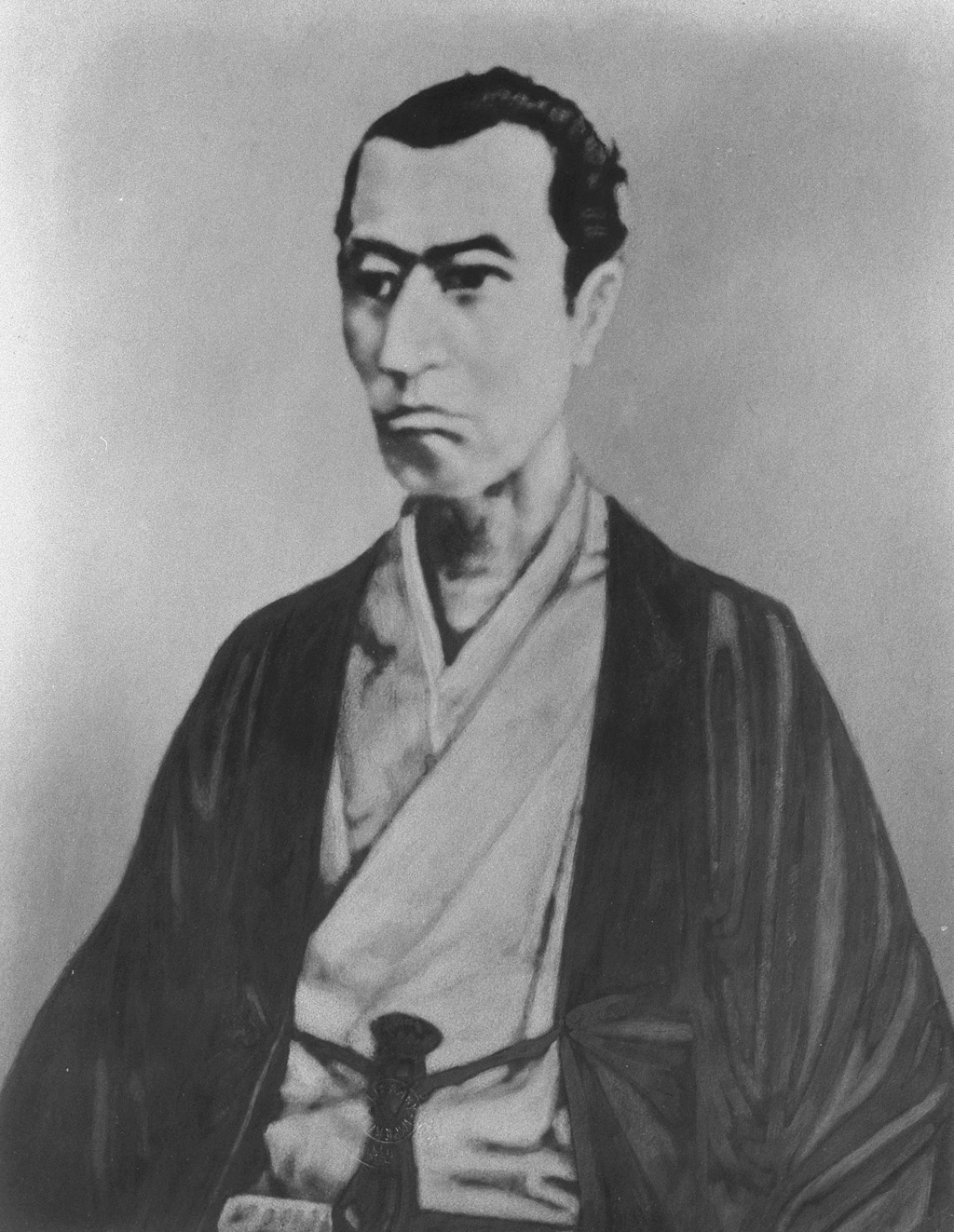
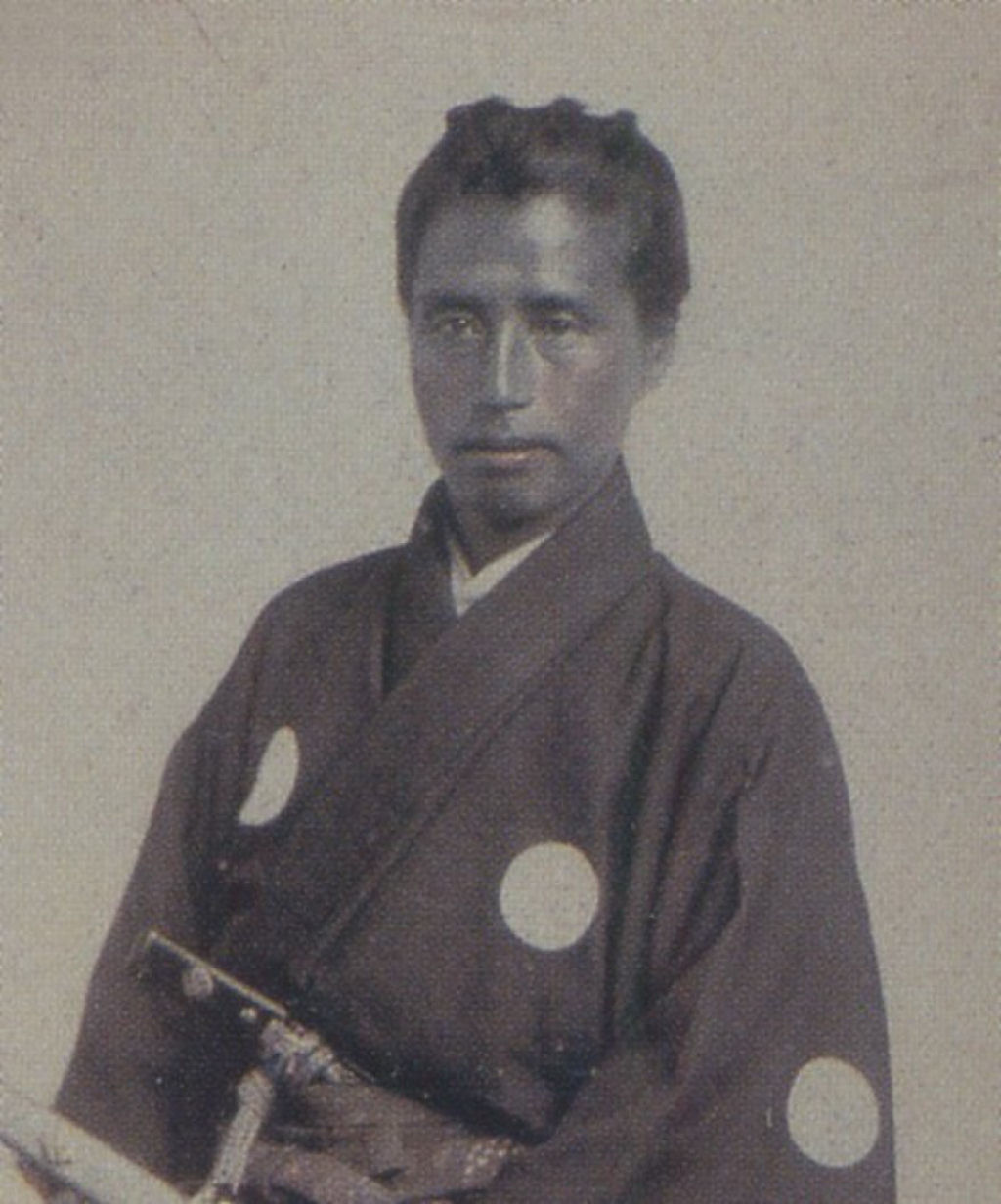
Sakuma Shōzan and his pupils Yoshida Shōin and Katsu Kaishū

Sakuma Shōzan was a midranking samurai under the daimyō Sanada Yukinori of Matsushiro Domain, he held a conservative attitude to the social development of Japanese society, but was practical in his approach to the adoption of Western technology. He supplemented his view of Neo-Confucian ethics with that of the adoption of foreign scientific methods, coining the phrase "Eastern ethics, Western science". (Note: tōyō dōtoku, seiyō gakugei, 東洋道徳西洋学芸) In addition to writing about the need for coastal defense, he took charge over cannon founding, built his own camera, and wrote a Japanese-English dictionary designed to contribute to the defense of Japan. He opened a school in Edo, teaching over 5,000 students from all over the country. His efforts to promote men of talent (who would be drawn exclusively from the samurai class), and reorganise the Japanese military were incredibly influential among his disciples, not least Katsu Kaishū and Yoshida Shōin. However, they would serve as the foundation for proposals that would change the social order he was attempting to preserve.

=== Economic development ===
The Tenpō Reforms (1841–1843) were a series of readjustments to government policy designed to reform issues in political and economic organisation, the result of which was to reveal a deep divide between the shogunate and the daimyō. During the 1830s and 1840s famine and popular unrest was widespread (e.g. the Osaka revolt), means to resolve these issues and their symptoms had mixed effects. Initial efforts by senior Rōjū Mizuno Tadakuni involved introducing sumptuary laws on the promotion of austerity and limiting consumption. Lowering or confiscating the stipends of samurai retainers alienated them from serving their lords, or even from the social class altogether with some choosing to pursue personal liberty and mercantile freedom not afforded to them due to their expectations as members of the samurai class. Daimyō cancelled debt owed to their own merchants and renegotiated favourable terms for debt owed to merchants under bakufu jurisdiction—due to resulting higher interest rates imposed on the daimyō to borrow more money, across Japan efforts were made to increase domain income. (Note: Beasley writes that the financial failure of his reforms led to Mizuno's dismissal in 1843, with the reforms of Tosa domain suffering a "similar fate", whereas Hizen, under Nabeshima Naomasa supplemented a policy of retrenchment with an "attack on landlordism" that was effective "in the short run", while Choshu domain found itself with spiralling debt.)

Fixed rice stipends made the samurai vulnerable to fluctuations in the market, periodic coinage debasement, and the need to transfer this stipend into the new monetary system. For instance, merchants who acted as agents to sell their stipends often pocketed the profit made on these sales. Meanwhile, as part of the development of urban life, artisans and farmers diversified the production of goods and crops which, due to increasing demand, often drained the samurai's resources while other crops became more lucrative to sell than rice. Many samurai were often constantly in debt, with the daimyō living under a system of enforced expenditure by the bakufu to carry out (among other things) the alternate exchange system and public works projects.

The bakufu started to show a small annual gold deficit by 1800, which had grown to over half a million ryō by 1837. To recoup some of these losses, the bakufu initiated a system of forced loans on the daimyō and conferred special privileges to merchants. The resultant diversification of merchant and artisanal industries also brought about a high degree of commercial specialisation and profound changes to rural life. Merchants collectively set up guilds and organised monopolies over goods and services, obtaining official status as contractors and suppliers. By the time of the Tenpō Reforms some of these guilds were broken up as they were believed to be increasing prices, but much of the cause was due to production not keeping up with demand.

The changing economic history of the Edo period drastically altered the traditionally rigid social hierarchy of Tokugawa Japan, with new land becoming available for cultivation and new outlets for commercial trade and manufacturing. Beyond changing the nature of value in local economies, these changes brought with them an erosion of the official class system, with some domains offering the sale of samurai status, and many rich commoners educating their children and bribing their way into adoption by poor samurai families. While the taxation and control over monopolies partially resolved the issue of government finance, it didn't resolve the issue of samurai poverty. Among farmers, the ability to increase land cultivation and cope with price fluctuations exacerbated wealth disparities, the difference in the tax burden between different crops meant that many fell into debt and tenancy to their wealthier neighbours. Satō Nobuhiro claimed that by 1827, at least 30% of farmers had lost land this way.

=== Foreign influence, 1633–1854 ===
Since 1633, a system of national isolation known as sakoku had been imposed by the Tokugawa shogunate, wherein no person was allowed to enter or leave Japan without permission from the shōgun. The resultant isolationism fuelled systemic diversification of the domestic economy to fulfil local needs. This socio-cultural development combined with strict regulation and censorship on the topic of politics created a "seldom penetrated" lack of international consciousness. Following the Shimabara Rebellion, the non-Catholic Dutch had been permitted to maintain a monopoly through their factory on Dejima, just off the coast of Nagasaki in Saga Domain. This trade, although limited in scope, had led to a growing understanding of the West by Tokugawa intellectuals. While this limited trade with the Dutch had disseminated aspects of Western culture into Japanese society, it also created an uneven understanding of the development of Western technology and military capabilities that did not seem to threaten the socio-political order.

==== Russian Empire ====
In the Edo period, a number of incidents occurred where Russians came into contact with Japanese people, due to exploration east by Russia and north by Japan. In 1804, Nikolai Rezanov entered Nagasaki bay with a letter from Tsar Alexander I requesting trade. After being refused this request, he staged a series of raids on Japanese settlements in Sakhalin and the Kuril Islands in 1806–1807. The 1811 Golovnin Incident inflamed Japanese mistrust of Russian expeditions, until Golovnin explained that the earlier raids by Rezanov had not been sanctioned by the Tsar. The growing contact with Russia caused the bakufu to attend to the defense of the northern frontier. The Napoleonic Wars drew the attention of both the Russians and the Japanese, who were concerned that the situation in Europe would impact trade with the Dutch. As a result, Russian interest in Pacific exploration declined until the 1840s.

==== Western Europe ====
During the Napoleonic Wars, the United Kingdom of Great Britain and Ireland assumed control over Dutch colonial possessions in south-east Asia, while Dejima was supplied by neutral charter ships from other countries. In 1808, a British frigate entered Nagasaki harbour demanding supplies from the Dutch. The Dutch station chief was attempting to conceal the situation in Europe, following political crisis in the Netherlands. British lieutenant-governor Stamford Raffles assumed control over Java, and made an unsuccessful attempt to bring the Nagasaki trade under British possession. This increasing contact with Europe caused the bakufu to begin hiring their own specialists to improve their understanding of western languages and cultures. However, by the time of the Morrison Incident (1837) and subsequent suppression of Western scholarship in 1839, the bakufu signalled a reverse course.

The threat of the Western powers became far more pronounced when news of Britain's success in the First Opium War against the Qing Dynasty reached Japan. The Nanking Treaty (1842) specified the transfer of Hong Kong to British control and detailed the opening of treaty ports. The ideological commitment to free trade by the British amounted to a loss of Chinese sovereignty over conducting their own foreign affairs. Information about the War was supposed to be strictly controlled, but the information spread among the daimyō. China's defeat was taken as a severe military and cultural disaster. The responses from officials within the bakufu were varied and contradictory; Dutch studies were still viewed with suspicion, but military applications were taken more seriously as interest among samurai scholars grew.

From 1843 reports started to circulate of British and French interests in the Ryukyu Islands, then in 1844 the Dutch King William II sent a letter to Japanese officials advising them to take the initiative in their interactions with foreign powers. It was around this time that the samurai intellectual Sakuma Shōzan wrote his first memoranda on the importance of coastal defence. A planned British expedition approved in 1845 failed to materialise when, conscious of the infamy incurred by forcing China to buy British opium, and in consideration of the more modest trading opportunities available in Japan, Britain decided to support and capitalise on the success of a planned American expedition to open Japan's ports.

==== United States ====
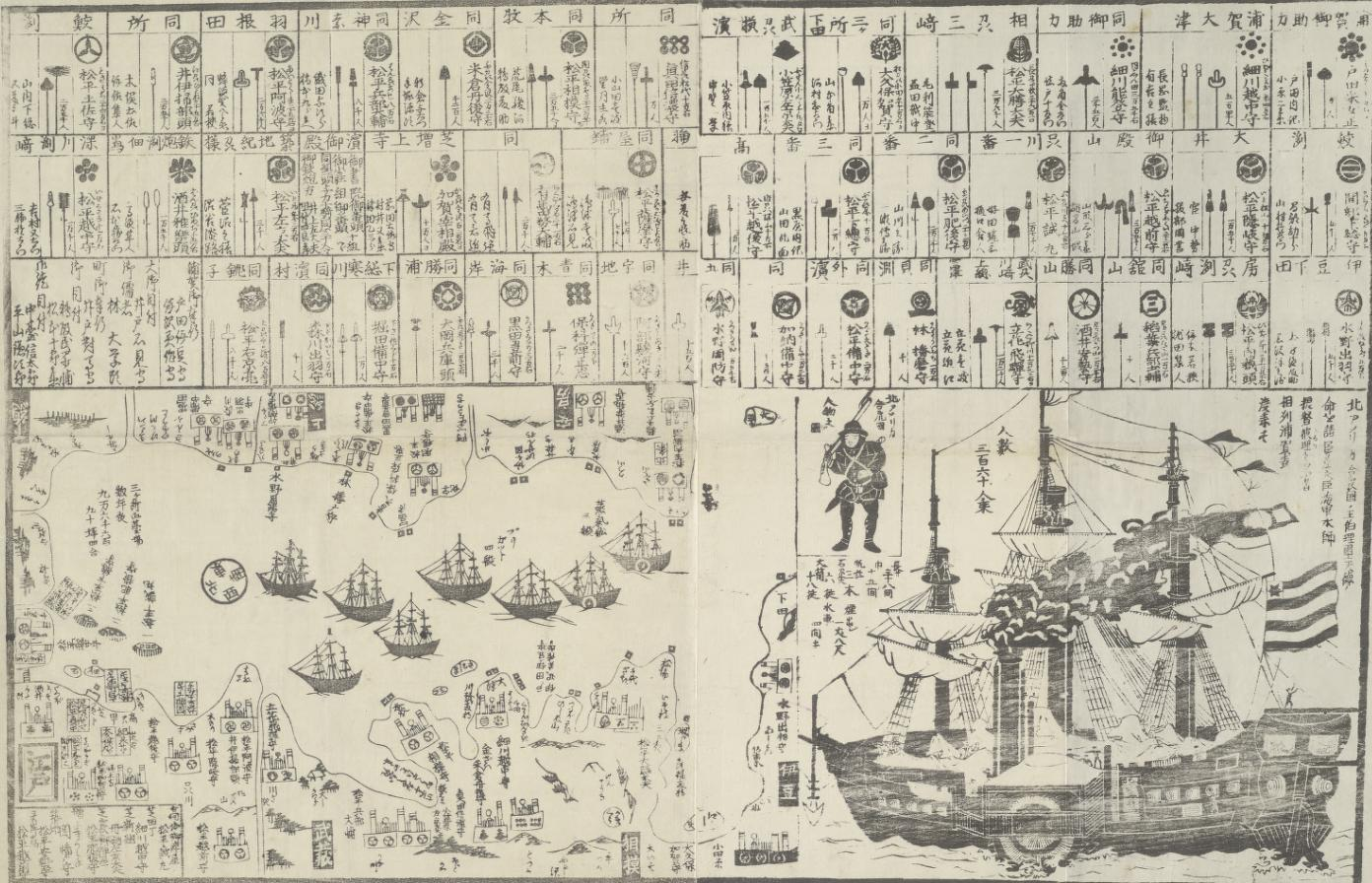
A Japanese print depicting the arrival of Perry's fleet (1854)

Appointed to command the American expedition in 1852, Commodore Matthew C. Perry was initially reluctant to take the command. American interests in Japan derived from ambitions to capitalise on the China trade and to ensure the protection of shipwrecked seamen, especially those of the essential and lucrative whaling industry. Their goal was to set up ports of free trade, and a place to secure provisions, including a coal pit for steam-ships. The first visit took Perry to Uraga, Kanagawa, where after entering Tokyo Bay, his consultations with the governor of Uraga led to him handing over documents requesting an end to Japanese isolation. This exchange took place in a ceremony at Kurihama on 14 July.

Beginning in August 1853, senior Rōjū Abe Masahiro took the unprecedented step of seeking a mandate from the daimyō. The results were inconclusive, with important figures urging different actions. Future rōju Hotta Masayoshi; fudai lord Ii Naosuke; and Shimazu Nariakira of Satsuma Domain agreed to some level of compromise, if only temporarily. Yamauchi Toyoshige recommended rejecting the treaty, while enlisting Dutch specialists to assist in manufacturing weapons. Tokugawa Nariaki gave the expulsionist view of the Mito School.

Less than a year later Perry returned in threatening large warships to conclude the treaty. His return in February was sooner than expected, partly because he had heard of a Russian mission in Nagasaki also seeking to negotiate a treaty. The bakufu attempted to conduct the talks at Uraga due to its further distance from Edo, but Perry insisted on Kanagawa. The talks were conducted between Perry and Hayashi Akira for 23 days. In 1854, the Convention of Kanagawa was signed. It opened up two treaty ports (Shimoda and Hakodate), ensured the safety of American seamen, and gave permission for American ships to buy their own provisions. As part of the treaty, Townsend Harris was appointed the first American consul to Japan. The treaty excluded any mention of the right to trade, which was considered a positive outcome by the bakufu's negotiators. However, Japan was now in a position where it had to sign similar treaties with Britain and Russia, effectively ending Japanese isolationism.

== End of the Tokugawa shogunate ==
=== Reactions to the Unequal Treaties, 1854–1858 ===
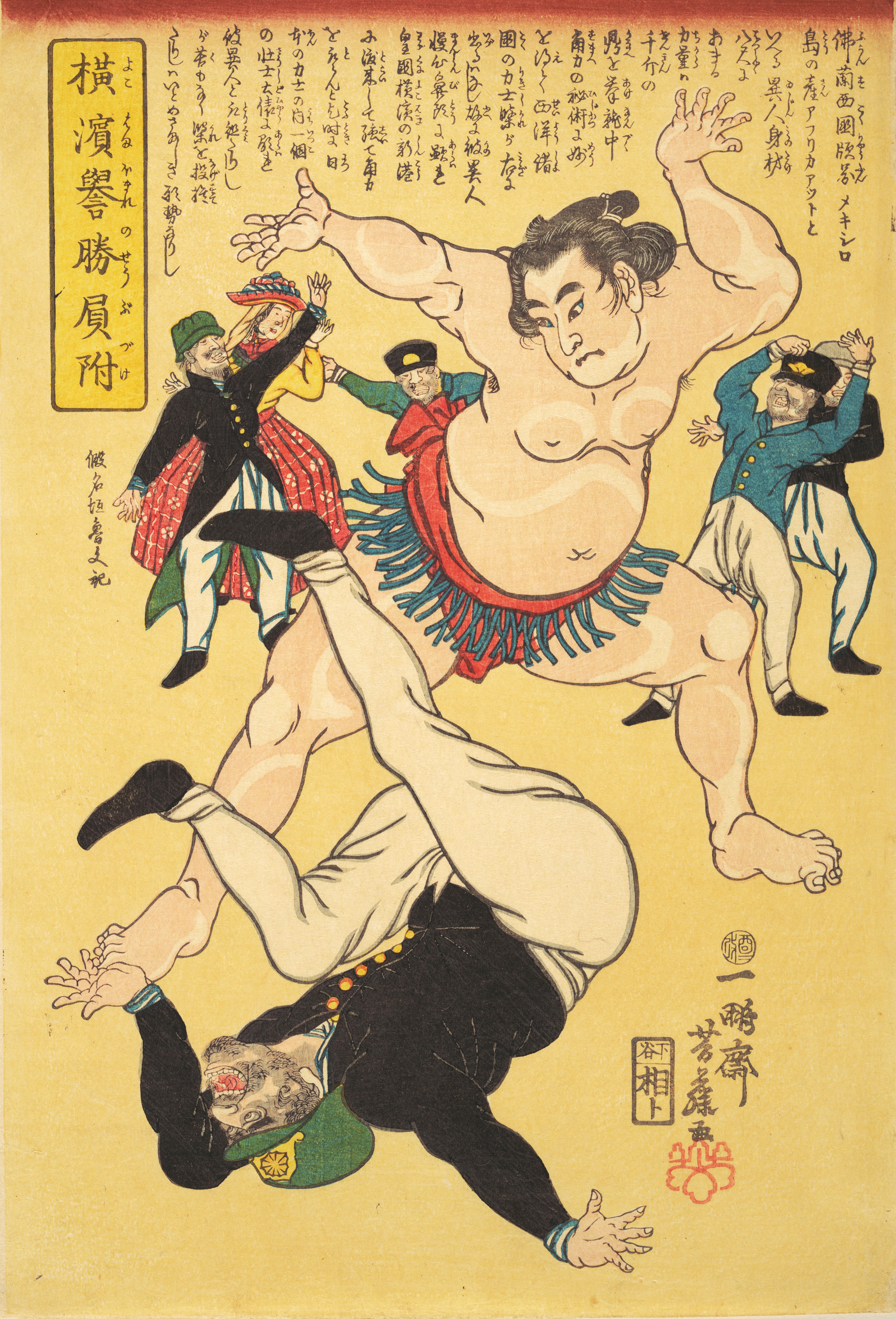
An 1861 print depicting jōi ("expel the barbarians").

The anti-treaty faction was horrified at the extent of the concessions made by Abe Masahiro to Perry in the Convention of Kanagawa. Even reformers who had advocated for compromise were upset at the magnitude of concessions made. From the Mito School, Fujita Yūkoku's disciple Aizawa Seishisai extended his teacher's ideas, writing the Shinron ("New Theses") in 1825. (Note: Although Aizawa wrote the Shinron in 1825, the text was not published until 1857.) Advocating a will to resist, Aizawa believed a policy of sonnō jōi ("revere the Emperor, expel the barbarian") would create a unity and resolution among the people. The shōgun would be responsible for subordinating the interests of the Tokugawa family to those of the Japanese people, by revering the Emperor as a symbol of the kokutai or national polity.

The positions of opening Japan and taking up arms against foreign powers were not mutually exclusive, and believers both in jōi and kaikoku realised the advantages of Western technology for the purpose of repelling the foreigners. In 1855, Abe resigned as senior rōju and was replaced by Hotta Masayoshi. An outcome of this decision was the estrangement of Tokugawa Nariaki from the senior council, as Hotta continued to drive in a reformist direction.

In 1855, the Nagasaki Naval Training Centre was founded with Katsu Kaishū serving in an important administrative function, and the individual domains were encouraged to build their own shipyards. Japan reluctantly expanded its treaties to France, Britain, the Netherlands and Russia. Negotiating treaties with Dutch Commissioner Donker Curtius in 1856 and 1857, a trade agreement was reached that opened Nagasaki and Hakodate to free trade open to all merchants; import duties of 35% were levied on private goods, but it marked a considerable change from the prior Dutch enclave on Dejima.

Harris' arrival in Japan as American consul heralded new treaty negotiations. Leveraging his position by instilling a fear of British and French imperialism (who were in the process of fighting the Second Opium War), he pursued negotiations with Hotta, and in 1857 was granted an audience with shōgun Tokugawa Iesada. In 1858, the Treaty of Amity and Commerce was confirmed, with provisions allowing for ambassadorial residence in Edo, extraterritoriality, the toleration of Christianity, and the opening of five ports for free trade between 1859 and 1863. (Note: The five ports were Ōsaka, Yokohama, Nagasaki, Niigata, and Kōbe.) These treaties have become known as the unequal treaties.

With the provisions of the treaties unpopular among both reformist and reactionary daimyō, Hotta sought to silence critics by seeking the approval of Emperor Kōmei, the outcome of which he considered a certainty. However, members of the Court were themselves influenced by Mito School writings and by the time Hotta reached Kyōto, they had been directly petitioned by anti-treaty daimyō, including Tokugawa Nariaki. The Emperor and his court expressed disfavour with the Harris Treaty, passing a resolution that encouraged Hotta to once more consult with the daimyō. This open rebuff caused Hotta's downfall. Although Hotta was forced from office, bakufu policy remained the same, and on 4 June 1858, Ii Naosuke was appointed tairō. Ii was conscious of going against the wishes of the Emperor and his Court, but decided to approve the treaty regardless, and it was signed on 29 July. Then, shōgun Tokugawa Iesada died on 14 August. Prior to his death it was stipulated that he would be succeeded by Tokugawa Iemochi, a child of twelve years old. It was an appointment that had been contested between factions of the daimyō, with Tokugawa Nariaki favouring his own son Tokugawa Yoshinobu as candidate for shōgun. In 1860, the Treaty of Amity and Commerce was ratified during the Japanese Embassy to the United States.

=== Political violence, 1858–1864 ===
Aware of how unpopular the treaty was, Ii Naosuke took his prerogative to be the restoration of strong, centralised bakufu governance. In pursuit of this aim, he enacted the Ansei Purge wherein over one hundred political enemies were punished, with eight killed, and many more were forced into house arrest. This was a use of force by the bakufu that had not been seen in centuries. His success in recentring political authority with the bakufu culminated in Manabe Akikatsu successfully petitioning for retrospective imperial support for the treaties from Emperor Kōmei. The principle ideology of conservative reform, kōbu gattai, referenced the 'unity of Court and bakufu', and was an ideological element committed to softly renegotiating the political relationship between the Tokugawa, the Emperor, and the daimyō; as part of this relationship, Tokugawa Iemochi was arranged to marry the Emperor's sister, Kazunomiya.

As Ii continued to centralise power around the shogunate, one of the people caught in his purges was the samurai intellectual Yoshida Shōin. A pupil of Sakuma Shōzan, Yoshida was what came to be known as a shishi, a "man of spirit". The shishi were low and middle-ranking samurai who were filled with reverence for the Imperial Court at Kyōto in which lay the essential quality of national purity. This was an ideological fusion based on Mito School kokugaku studies of Neo-Confucian principles of loyalty and the Shintō revival of the early 19th century, with shishi believing loyalty to the Emperor to be of the utmost importance. They saw the bakufu as becoming increasingly self-interested, with the daimyō unwilling to intervene in mediating open disagreement between the Imperial Court and the bakufu over the issue of the foreign threat. The crisis of 1858 had changed Yoshida's perspective, where before he had been open to conciliation between the Court and bakufu, he now believed the shishi should take direct action in response to the actions of the bakufu and daimyō. Yoshida's increasingly extreme teachings lost him the support of influential samurai, as well as his own pupils (including Kido Takayoshi and Takasugi Shinsaku). He was executed in 1859 for planning the assassination of Manabe Akikatsu.

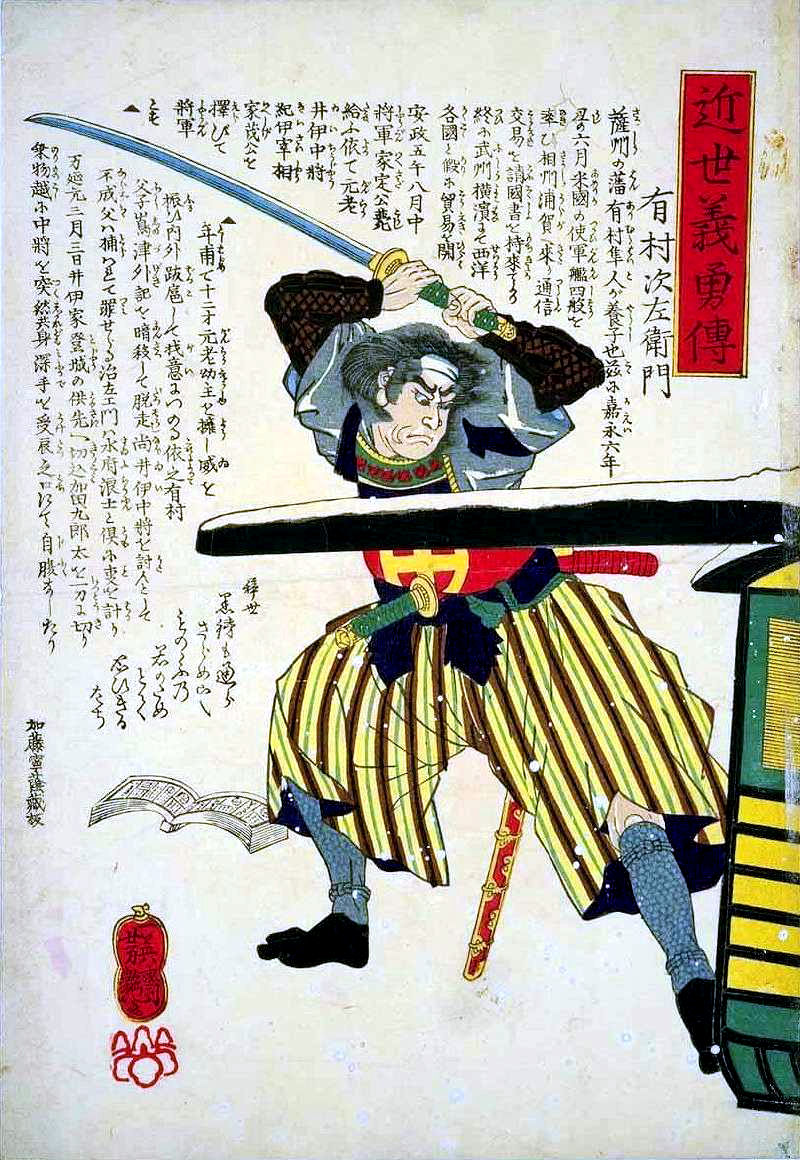
Arimura Jisaemon preparing to decapitate Ii Naosuke (1860)

The culmination of unrest among lower-samurai in response to the heavy-handed exercise of authority by the bakufu occurred when Ii was assassinated in 1860. This action engendered a new violent consciousness centred on the principle of sonnō jōi. Later that same year, Tokugawa Nariaki died while still under confinement. Jansen writes that, in the aftermath of the killing, many lower and middle-ranking samurai began to see a means to effect "changes to their personal and collective position". In Satsuma Domain, a loyalist group under Ōkubo Toshimichi moved towards conciliation with the domain officials, concerning themselves with persuading the daimyō to break with the bakufu cause; Saigō Takamori would join this group upon return from his exile in 1862. In Tosa Domain, Takechi Hanpeita met with Kido Takayoshi and Kusaka Genzui who shared their martyred teacher's philosophy. Formalising his leadership over a group of local shishi in October 1861, the loyalist party (among whom was counted Sakamoto Ryōma, although he left in 1862) did not view their loyalty to the Emperor as contradictory to their traditional feudal loyalties.

The shishi loyalists achieved some success in national politics, successfully renegotiating the conditions of kōbu gattai to favour the Imperial Court through their co-operation with the Chōshū government. Shishi were promoted in these regions (Ōkubo in Satsuma Domain, and Kido in Chōshū—both of whom were seen to be a moderating force against extremists), but they did not represent a majority view of domain officials. Despite the politics of Chōshū Domain being decidedly more moderate than the advice of the Chōshū loyalists in Kyōto, the regent of Satsuma Domain, Shimazu Hisamitsu was angry at the amount of influence Chōshū Domain shishi were having on Court politics.

==== Foreign intervention ====
During a mission to Kyōto regarding the position of the Imperial Court in the political authority of the bakufu to order the expulsion of the foreigners, the retainers of Shimazu Hisamitsu's procession killed a British merchant who attempted to cross through the procession. Subsequent British threats for satisfaction drew Shimazu's attention away from Court politics, and thus in March 1863, the Imperial Court issued the order to expel barbarians. When the deadline for the order to expel the barbarians came, Chōshū Domain decided to open fire on the foreign powers in their waters, starting what became known as the Shimonoseki campaign. In August, British frustrations with Satsuma inaction regarding the recompense they were seeking boiled over, leading to the bombardment of Kagoshima. The expulsion order coupled with military action led not only to a deterioration of relations with the foreign powers, but also issued a challenge to bakufu authority. The resultant military failure of Satsuma and Chōshū to repel the foreign powers led the Imperial Court to backtrack, affirming the administrative role of the shōgun. However, the announcements to strengthen the authority of the bakufu did so at the expense of the interests of the daimyō who sought to reform the structure of governance.

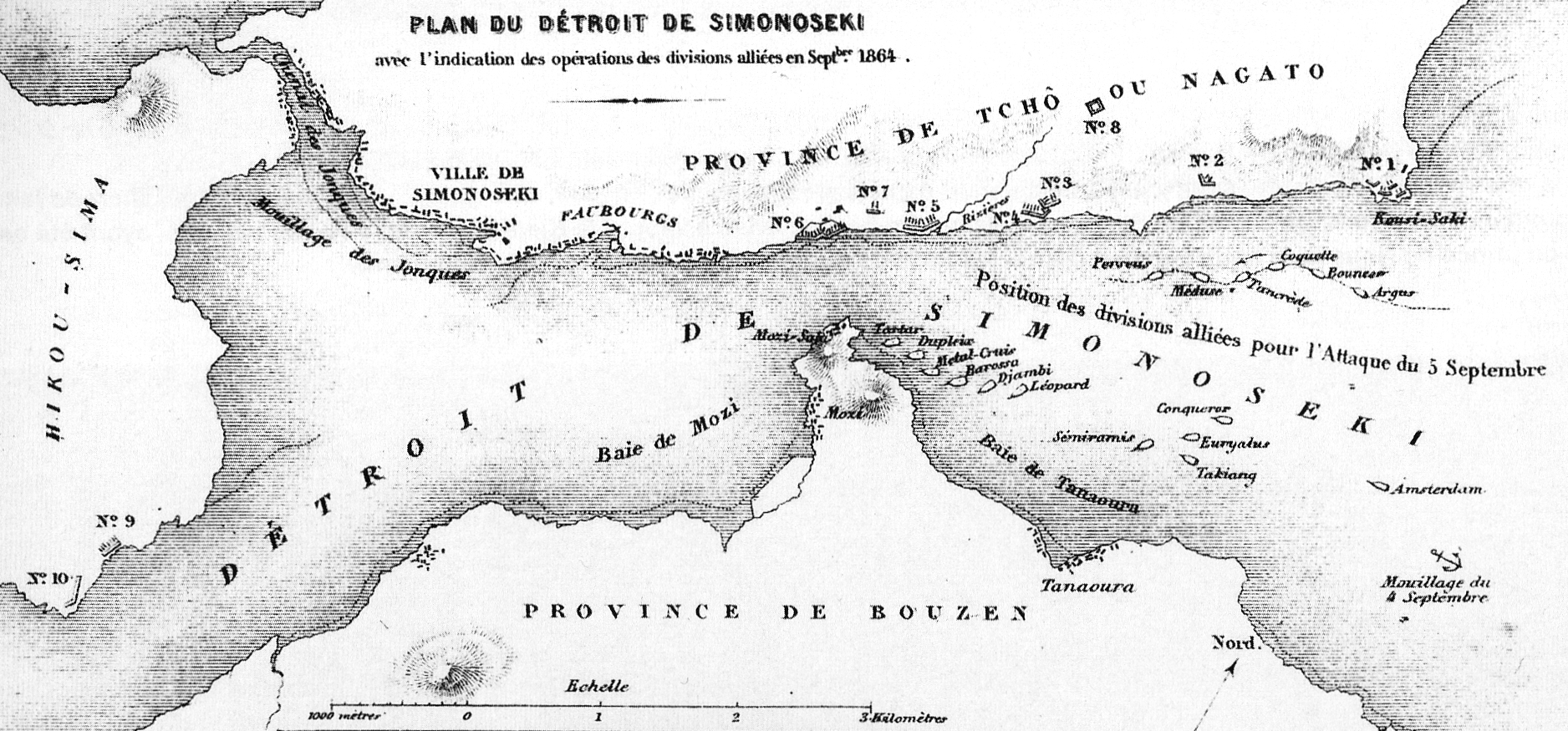
Map showing the allied attack of Shimonoseki (September 1864)

The Shimonoseki agreement to end the foreign attacks signed by the bakufu in October 1864 signalled a shift in policy that prioritised dealing with the foreign powers in a nonantagonistic manner. The bakufu would marshal its influence against the Imperial Court whenever they agitated for a policy of jōi. Similarly, the burgeoning anti-Tokugawa movement was shifting ideological emphasis away from direct expulsion towards fukoku kyōhei (rich nation, strong army) as a way to deal with the threat posed by the foreign powers. Indicative of this is that, just prior to this time, Sakamoto Ryōma met Katsu Kaishū intending to assassinate him for his perceived pro-foreign beliefs, what occurred instead was a conversation wherein Ryōma became convinced by Kaishū's plan for rearmament, following Kaishū when he later established the Kobe Naval Training Centre in 1863. As bakufu power began to be challenged, a split emerged between the foreign powers; France, represented by Léon Roches favoured bolstering the Tokugawa to deal with internal strife, whereas Britain's minister Harry Parkes increasingly began to favour dealing with the southwest domains of Satsuma and Chōshū.

=== Anti-Tokugawa alliance and domain rebellion, 1864–1867 ===
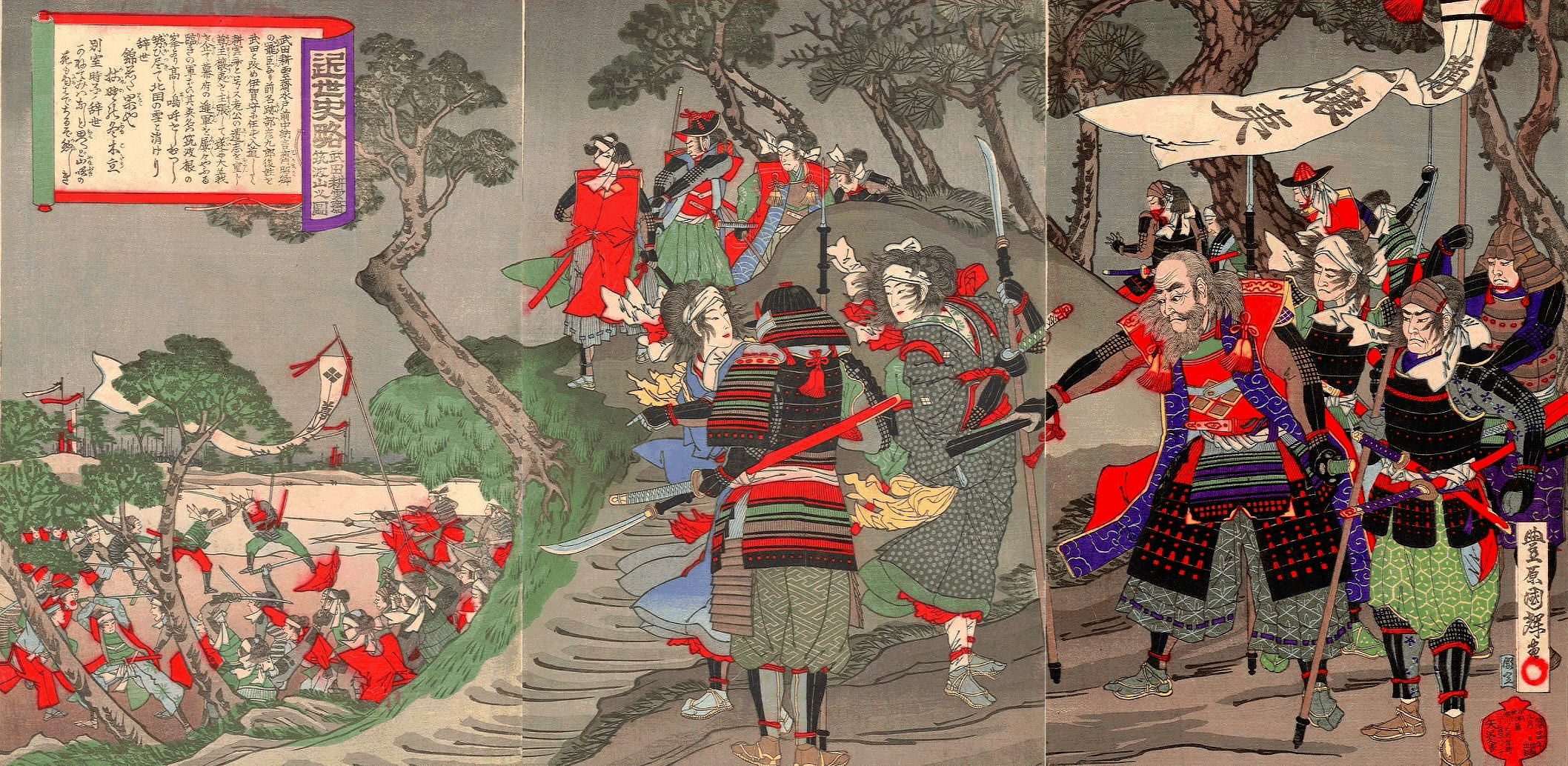
Japanese print by Utagawa Kuniteru III depicting "Takeda Kōunsai at Mt. Tsukuba" under the banner of sonnō jōi.

A period of conservative reaction against the shishi followed the military failures of 1863 and 1864. It was during this period of backlash against the sonnō jōi ideology of the loyalists that Takechi Hanpeita was arrested and compelled to commit seppuku by the daimyō of Tosa Domain Yamauchi Yōdō. Following the death of Tokugawa Nariaki in 1860, Mito Domain had been dominated by upper-ranking conservative samurai who favoured conciliation with the Tokugawa bakufu, but a power struggle developed from the belief that the bakufu's pro-foreign tendencies were threatening the Imperial Court's expulsion edict. With news of uprisings in Yamato and Tajima, in May 1864 pro-sonnō jōi loyalists declared the Mito Rebellion in defiance of the bakufu.

Beasley identifies two principal lessons from the military defeat of the Mito Rebellion, the requirement of one of the great domains to support the movement and the division within the social structure of Restoration politics. The shishi, being predominantly lower-ranking samurai of the rural elite, were abandoned by the local peasantry (poorer farmers either abandoned or joined the bakufu forces in attacking the loyalists). Similarly, the tepid support for (in the case of Mito) or the criticism of (in Yamato and Tajima) the revolts of the lower-ranking samurai by the more moderate middle-ranking samurai, shifted the emphasis towards "a political method more in conformity with the needs of feudal society." By the spring of 1864, Satsuma Domain policy had shifted to moderation, seeking the removal of shishi influence from the Court and its domain government, as part of this policy they worked with the bakufu to violently suppress the shishi in Kyōto. As a result, Chōshū became the last refuge for sonnō jōi loyalists. A power struggle over the domain's politics soon followed, as did a contest between bakufu and domain political power.

In Chōshū, the remnant shishi organised themselves into militias (e.g. the Kiheitai led by Takasugi Shinsaku) to assist the domain's army in the event of attack by the bakufu or foreign powers. The militias supported the moderate Sufu Masanosuke when he was forced from office by domain conservatives, and secured positions for other loyalists, including Takasugi and Kido Takayoshi, exerting their power over the government. When the Imperial Court issued edicts that reneged on the prior order to expel the barbarians, many in the militias wished to march on Kyōto to regain access to the Emperor. Despite opposition from Takasugi, the extremists won out, but the resulting Hamaguri Gate Rebellion was a political failure, leading to the death of Kusaka Genzui. The bakufu quickly moved to declare Chōshū Domain in rebellion, launching the punitive First Chōshū expedition with the co-operation of Satsuma Domain forces under Saigō Takamori in the autumn of 1864.

Despite the rōju advocating for the execution of Chōshū's daimyō Mōri Takachika, the result of the settlement was relatively generous to Chōshū, due in part to the intervention of Katsu Kaishū and Saigō. As such, when the expedition disbanded, the Chōshū militias submitted a memorandum to the domain government chastising them for acquiescing to the bakufu's demands. Then, in early 1865 Takasugi launched an attack on the domain government. The Kiheitai under Yamagata Aritomo joined the attack, and the domain government quickly ousted the conservatives who had been restored to power following the bakufu's punitive expedition. The loyalists advocated for turning from a position of foreign expulsion to fukoku kyōhei, with Itō Hirobumi, Inoue Kaoru and Ōmura Masujirō joining Takasugi and Kido in seeking to open the port of Shimonoseki for trade in order to import foreign weapons.

==== Satsuma-Chōshū Alliance ====
Beasley identifies three issues in Japanese politics until this point: that of foreign policy, that of Tokugawa authority, and that of feudal discipline. In reducing the importance of jōi sentinment in Chōshū, the first issue was no longer divisive; the incorporation or destruction of shishi loyalists by the domain governments across Japan had solved many problems related to the third issue; this left the question of bakufu power at the centre of national politics. Until this point, Satsuma Domain's cooperation with the bakufu in the Hamaguri Gate Rebellion and subsequent punitive expedition had been a point of tension and mistrust with Chōshū Domain. However, continued bakufu designs to destroy Chōshū pushed Saigō Takamori to reject the prerogatives of the Tokugawa, he appealed to the domain regent Shimazu Hisamitsu and began buying weaponry from the British. Meanwhile, Sakamoto Ryōma assisted Chōshū loyalists to bypass the bakufu's prohibition on domain weapons trade by setting up connections to British merchants via his firm in Nagasaki. From here he laid the logistical and diplomatic foundations for co-operation between the two domains. On 7 March 1866, Sakamoto successfully brought together Kido Takayoshi and Saigō Takamori to formalise an alliance between Satsuma and Chōshū.

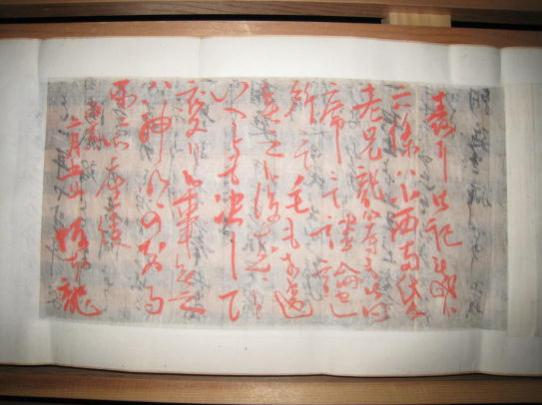
Note on the back of the Satchō Alliance written by Sakamoto Ryōma.

Planning for the Second Chōshū expedition sought to end the possibility of domain resistance to Tokugawa authority. When hostilities became inevitable by the summer of 1866, Chōshū moved quickly to repulse or forestall any bakufu operations. When the bakufu sent out requests among Chōshū's neighbouring domains to assist in shogunal efforts, the domains offered noncommittal or hostile responses. Many of the daimyō were suspicious of bakufu aims and were concerned about encroaching French influence in the bakufu's capability to build a centralised state. Satsuma regent Shimazu Hisamitsu expressed a widely held belief in a memorial to the Imperial Court that accused the bakufu of seeking a draconian settlement with Chōshū that risked the safety of the country at large. The simultaneous death of shōgun Tokugawa Iemochi caused the bakufu to seek a truce.

==== Restoration movement ====
Shortly following the success of Chōshū against the bakufu, Court noble Iwakura Tomomi suggested the Emperor agitate openly for full imperial restoration, (Note: ōsei fukko, 王政復古) but the Court remained cautious of overplaying their hand. At the same time, the daimyō had their own designs for restructuring the system of feudal autonomy that did not fully correspond with his proposal. Emperor Kōmei died in February 1867, leaving the teenager Mutsuhito to ascend to the throne as Emperor Meiji. Offers for a mediated settlement were proposed by the new shōgun Tokugawa Yoshinobu; but when they were ignored the bakufu instituted a series of reforms to the military, administration, and finance. These serious efforts at reform sparked worries among some in the anti-Tokugawa alliance, and in 1867, Saigō and Ōkubo Toshimichi both wrote to Shimazu to indicate their support for returning the country's administration to the power of the Emperor.

At the urging of Saigō and Ōkubo, four daimyō (Date Munenari, Matsudaira Yoshinaga, Yamauchi, and the regent Shimazu) sent to negotiate with the shōgun over the opening the port at Kōbe and the policy towards Chōshū repudiated the compromise they made with Tokugawa Yoshinobu. In late June, they publicly disputed the shōgun's account in the Imperial Court when Tokugawa attempted to take advantage of a fractured opposition to assert the traditional authority of the shōgun. As plans formalised among the anti-Tokugawa alliance, Sakamoto drafted an Eight Point Plan that would serve as the foundation of restoration politics. It included provisions for expanding the military, reform of the law, establishing a bicameral legislature, and the return of political power to the Imperial Court. As a representative of Tosa Domain, Sakamoto was seeking to position himself between the Satchō alliance and the bakufu and submitted his proposals to the Tosa Domain government, which became the basis for plans submitted to the shōgun to persuade him to resign his powers.

== Imperial restoration ==
=== Dissolution of the shogunate, 1867 ===
Tokugawa Yoshinobu informs officials of his decision at Nijō Castle in 1867.

With the domains preparing to use military force to remove the bakufu government, the Tosa Domain memorandum was submitted to Tokugawa Yoshinobu at a time when some of the shōgun's advisors were advocating for similar reforms. Seeking to maintain his title and influence, on 8 November 1867, Tokugawa Yoshinobu, the 15th Tokugawa shōgun, decided to renounce the administrative functions of his office and returned the power to the Imperial Court. The following day, the Court received the memorandum, but also sent a rescript authorising the domain governments to use military force to oust the bakufu. (Note: The authenticity of the rescript's provenance has been contested.) Ten days later on 19 November, Tokugawa also resigned the title of shōgun. As Tokugawa remained inert in temporarily exercising his authority, the Court was divided, while the daimyō continued planning for a violent confrontation. Iwakura Tomomi, Saigō Takamori, and Ōkubo Toshimichi spent the months of November and December organising a coup d'état within the divided Imperial Court, with the aim to strip the Tokugawa house of their lands held in fief. This would prevent them from dominating the future council of daimyō.

The suspicion and disorder that accompanied the shōgun's resignation led to violence in Kyōto, during which Sakamoto Ryōma was assassinated. Tosa Domain had sponsored the shōgun's abdication request, but Satsuma and Chōshū officials were intent on establishing their domains at the centre of a new system. The requirement for Satsuma and Chōshū to demonstrate they were acting in accordance with the wishes of the Emperor led them to formulate the 3 January proclamation, making the Imperial Court's anti-shogunate stance official. In analysing how the Tokugawa shogunate collapsed so suddenly, Jansen indicates that the division of the bakufu's network of feudal relations had its attention split between focus on the Imperial Court and individual preoccupation with domain affairs. The office of shōgun suffered an erosion of authority as domain bureaucrats began exercising their power over policy to promote their leadership over other domains'; this evolved into a programme realised by individual personalities and military force.

=== January Proclamation, 1868 ===
In the early hours of 3 January 1868, domain troops seized control of the Imperial Palace from the bakufu while Iwakura simultaneously received official approval from the Emperor for these actions. Prior to a hastily summoned meeting organised by Iwakura, the Emperor granted permission to announce a decree that would accept Tokugawa Yoshinobu's resignation as shōgun and resume the political functions of the Imperial House. Among those in attendance were Matsudaira Shungaku and Nakayama Tadayasu, while adherents to the bakufu (including many Court officials) were prevented from attending. Tokugawa rule was thus ended by the Emperor's declaration of the restoration of his authority:

The Emperor of Japan announces to the sovereigns of all foreign countries and to their subjects that permission has been granted to the Shōgun Tokugawa Yoshinobu to return the governing power in accordance with his own request. We shall henceforward exercise supreme authority in all the internal and external affairs of the country. Consequently, the title of Emperor must be substituted for that of Taikun, in which the treaties have been made. Officers are being appointed by us to the conduct of foreign affairs. It is desirable that the representatives of the treaty powers recognize this announcement.

— Mutsuhito, January 3, 1868

Despite the new government being in a state of precarity, public placards and street demonstrations were often loyalist in tone. The restructuring of the relationship between Court and bakufu that this pronouncement represented was materialised in the abolition of prior offices, to be replaced with a Chief Executive (Prince Arisugawa), Senior Councillors, and Junior Councillors. Many of the first office holders were directly specified in the meeting, with Chōshū Domain remaining absent from receiving official placements as the daimyō had not yet been pardoned. Following the proclamation, the newly formed council was split over how to treat Tokugawa Yoshinobu. Tokugawa registered his intention to negotiate and decided to withdraw to Ōsaka Castle on 6 January. This move to mediate between Court and bakufu temporarily weakened the position of Satsuma officials in the council. The pardoning and accession of Chōshū Domain officials rallied support and co-operation from other domains and loyalist groups. Both sides were becoming belligerent, some Satsuma samurai provoked riots against the Tokugawa in Edo. Upon hearing this, Tokugawa's loyal vassals persuaded him to take up arms against the council.

=== Boshin War, 1868–1869 ===
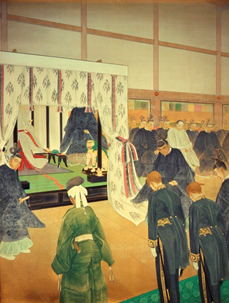
Emperor Meiji receives Dutch minister Dirk de Graeff van Polsbroek in 1868.

Recognising that the Court had made a mistake in allowing Tokugawa autonomy, Ōkubo contacted Iwakura and the Satchō military officers to take action before Tokugawa could re-establish his influence among the daimyō. On the 27 January, the Battle of Toba–Fushimi took place, in which Chōshū and Satsuma's forces defeated the Tokugawa's army. Seeking to avoid a full civil war, Tokugawa retreated to Edo by sea and refused to counter-attack. An Imperial decree on 31 January blamed the Tokugawa for starting hostilities and Ōsaka Castle surrendered three days later. The army moved to take Edo during late February, then on 1 March, Prince Arisugawa was made supreme commander of the Imperial forces during the campaign.

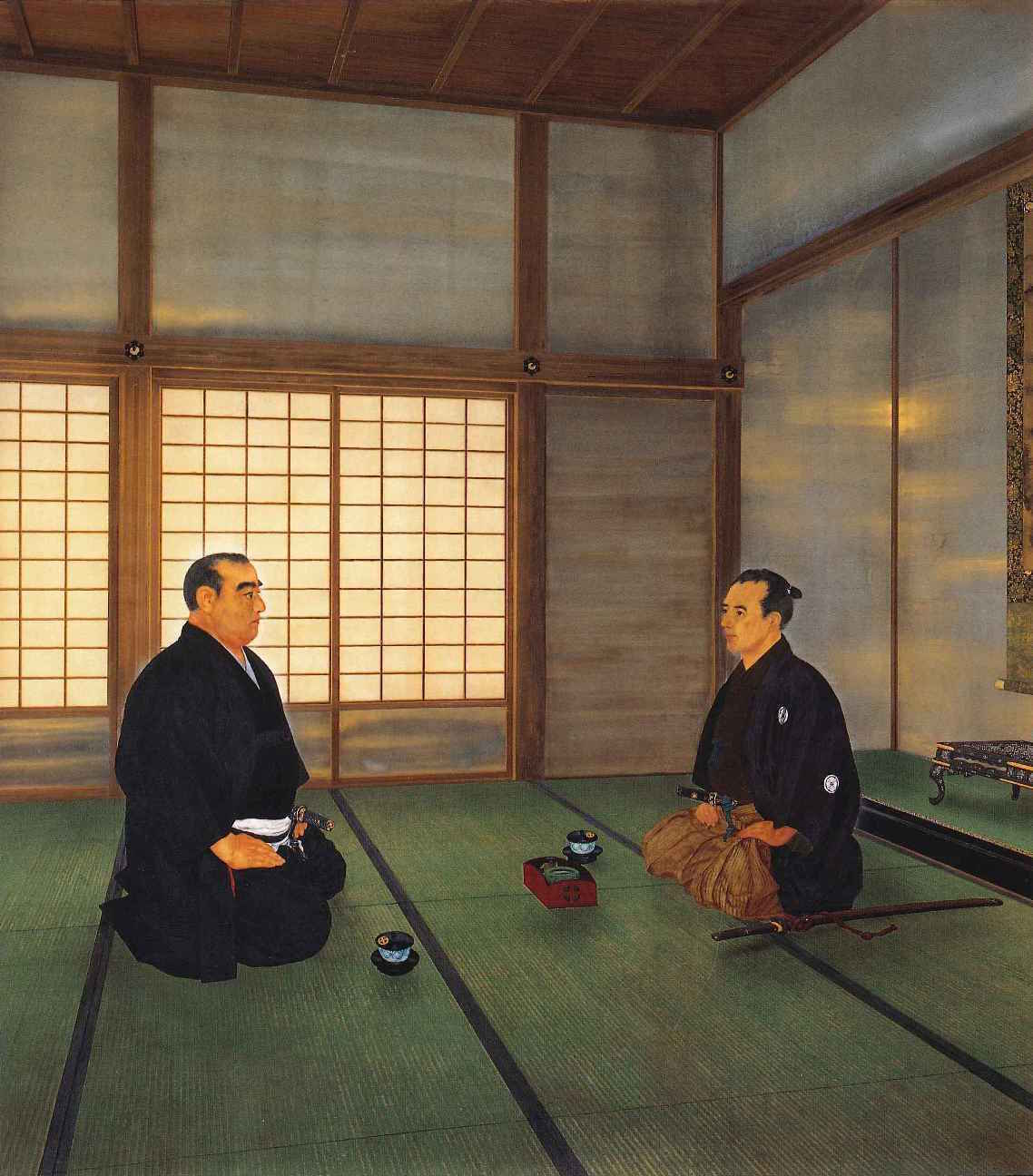
Saigō Takamori and Katsu Kaishū negotiating the surrender of Edo Castle.

The Court, seeking improved relations with the foreigners, issued orders that brought their military conduct in alignment with international standards, and on 23 March the Dutch minister Dirk de Graeff van Polsbroek and the French minister Léon Roches became the first European envoys to receive a personal audience with Meiji. Seeking a negotiated settlement, Tokugawa wrote to Saigō Takamori and elevated Katsu Kaishū to a position with the authority to represent the Tokugawa house. In April, Katsu and Saigō met to discuss the conditions that would be faced by Tokugawa. Both sides agreed to Tokugawa surrendering himself, his castle, and military force. Iwakura took this agreement and stipulated that Tokugawa Yoshinobu resign as head of the family and surrender all but 700,000 koku of his lands, a deal that Tokugawa accepted on 3 May.

Some Emperor loyalists were unsatisfied with what they considered to be lenient conditions, meanwhile, troops of the Northern Alliance from Aizu and Sendai challenged the authority of Satsuma and Chōshū Domain exercised over the Emperor. The Alliance was defeated by early November, but remnants of the old bakufu navy under Enomoto Takeaki escaped to Hokkaidō, where they attempted to set up a breakaway Republic of Ezo. Forces loyal to the Emperor ended this attempt in May 1869 with the Battle of Hakodate. Seeking to end further hostilities and unify the country, Tokugawa Yoshinobu was pardoned on 1 November 1869, after which many of the Tokugawa loyalists (including Enomoto and Nagai Naoyuki) were also pardoned. This extension of clemency ended the antagonistic relationship between the Court and bakufu. The capital of Edo was renamed Tōkyō on 3 September 1868. The Emperor took up residence in the city in 1869. (Note: The Emperor lived in Edo castle, but it would not be renamed the Imperial Palace until 1873.)

To Beasley, the result of the Boshin War reflected a victory of the political programme of the shishi and the modernising technological reforms of progressive daimyō. Until their victory over the Tokugawa, the supporters of the Imperial Court (chiefly Satsuma and Chōshū) were not seeking to change the institutions of power but displace those wielding it. The issues facing the new government sought conceptual and pragmatic solutions that led to the development of a centralised absolutism. National unity brought about by political change was considered a necessary objective to fulfil by members of the new government.

== Imperial reform ==
=== Charter Oath, 1868 ===
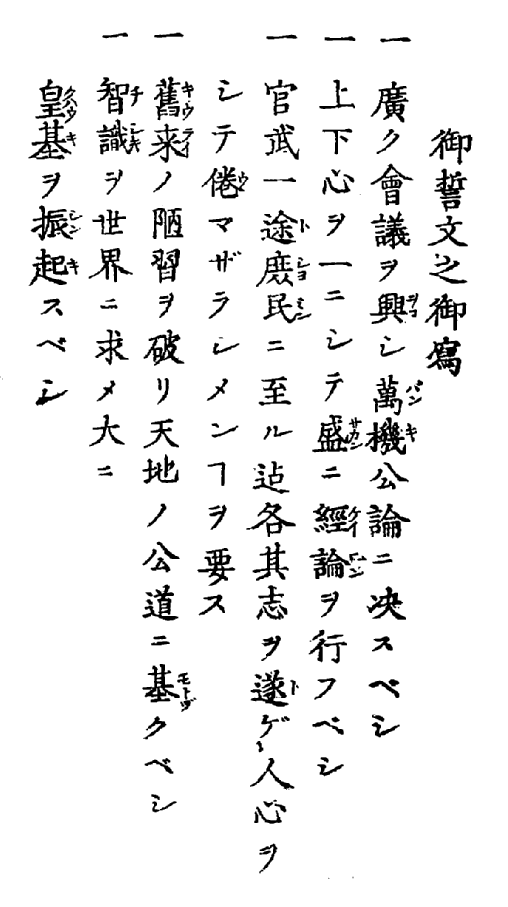
The five clauses of the Charter Oath as promulgated in April 1868.

Drawn up by figures largely from the southwestern domains, the Charter Oath of 1868 was intended as a document to reassure non-Restorationist domains that they would be consulted about decisions concerning objectives of the government. However, the final draft went further and directly indicated the policy objectives of the new Imperial government. The Oath was issued on 6 April 1868. (Note: Japan would use a lunar calendar until 1873, under the old system this date was 14 March. Marius Jansen writes 5 April 1868.) The provisions of the Charter Oath called for the rejection of past political administration, for the country to be enriched, and the adoption of Western technology.

The emphasis of the Charter Oath was on the confirmation of the Emperor's authority, harnessing national potential to confirm the new government. The Oath did not specify a progressive agenda or specific form of governance, but confirmed the new government under a system of centralised national sovereignty.

=== Abolition of the Domains, 1868–1873 ===
The abolition of the domains began from a desire to centralise authority and enforce political decisions within the multi-domain alliance that had brought the Restoration about. Starting in June 1868, the enforcement of some bakufu decrees concerning a prohibition on individual domains from forming alliances and issuing coinage were reinstated. The lands of the shōgun and his daimyō supporters were seized and reorganised into urban prefectures (府, fu) and rural prefectures (県, ken), placing them under the authority of the new Meiji government. Other individual domains were initially left untouched, but were required to change their administration: to promote men of talent (thereby forcing the daimyō to give up much of their authority over their own domains) and send one representative to a consultative assembly in the new imperial capital.

Facing consternation from conservative daimyō, Kido Takayoshi and Itō Hirobumi agreed that Japan would require the daimyō to surrender their lands in order to create a centralised army and bureaucracy. To overcome these concerns, Itō drafted a proposal that provided access to titles, stipends, and positions in the new administration to those daimyō and their retainers who willingly surrendered their domains. Consulting with members of the domain governments, the mixed reception the proposal received pushed members of the Meiji government (including Ōkubo Toshimichi and Itagaki Taisuke), to force progress by acting unilaterally on behalf of their daimyō. The document submitted to the Imperial Court on 5 March 1869 put the lands of Satsuma, Chōshū, Tosa, and Hizen at the disposal of the Emperor.

The daimyō still remained broadly opposed to any plan that would cause them to cede their territory, many simply hoped to substitute the Emperor for the shōgun. Iwakura drafted a compromise proposal in July 1869, in it the daimyō were to retain their land under the title of governor or vice-governor. 10% of their domain revenues would be sent to the Court, with the rest spent on administrative costs, while they were to obey Imperial directives on matters of general policy. The upper strata was reformed to unify the daimyō and members of the Court into a new aristocracy. In an attempt to shore up government support, Kido Takayoshi, Sanjō Sanetomi, and Iwakura Tomomi sought to redress the imbalance of influence exerted by progressive reformers. Over the course of 1870 and 1871, they conducted missions to various daimyō of the former anti-bakufu alliance, and reached a collective decision that it was necessary to abolish the domains.

Domestic tensions within the domain alliance and the broader samurai class meant the debate over the abolition of the domains threatened both national unity and government unity. Kido, Saigō, and Ōkubo resisted this threat by re-organising the government to concentrate power among themselves. Kido and Saigō became the only two Councillors while Ōkubo became Minister of Finance. Through the promotion of Ōkuma Shigenobu and Itō Hirobumi to ensure the support of their respective domains, the daimyō in Tōkyō were summoned in August 1871, whereupon they were informed of the decision taken to abolish the domains without consultation. In return they were to keep a small portion of their income and gain access to the new aristocracy. These new aristocrats were ordered to move to Tōkyō, separated from their former domains, in January 1872, the 302 domains were formally reorganised into 72 prefectures. According to Beasley, this process dissolved the feudal system even as a parallel social system arose to replace it, domain regional power began to exert control in the centralising bureaucracy as controllers of that bureaucracy, whereas before the regional governments had instead been "objects of [bakufu] policy."

=== Abolition of the samurai class ===
The 1869 regulations on the allocation of domain revenues and the position of the samurai class largely undermined the power of hereditary position, as they had aimed to universalise the restructuring of the political and bureaucratic systems governing the domains. The promotion of efficiency and men of talent coincided with a severe cut to stipends that adversely affected the socioeconomic position of many lower and middle ranking samurai that had supported loyalist aims. Moral conservatives were also growing increasingly concerned at these changes, which they saw as the adoption of foreign practices. From 1870, several samurai among the western domains (chiefly Chōshū, Satsuma, and Kagoshima) began to voice their discontent with traditional organisational structures being folded into the new modernising administration; political violence erupted and several modernisers were assassinated—including Ōmura Masujirō.

Later, in 1874, the samurai were given the option to convert their stipends into government bonds. Finally, in 1876, this commutation was made compulsory.

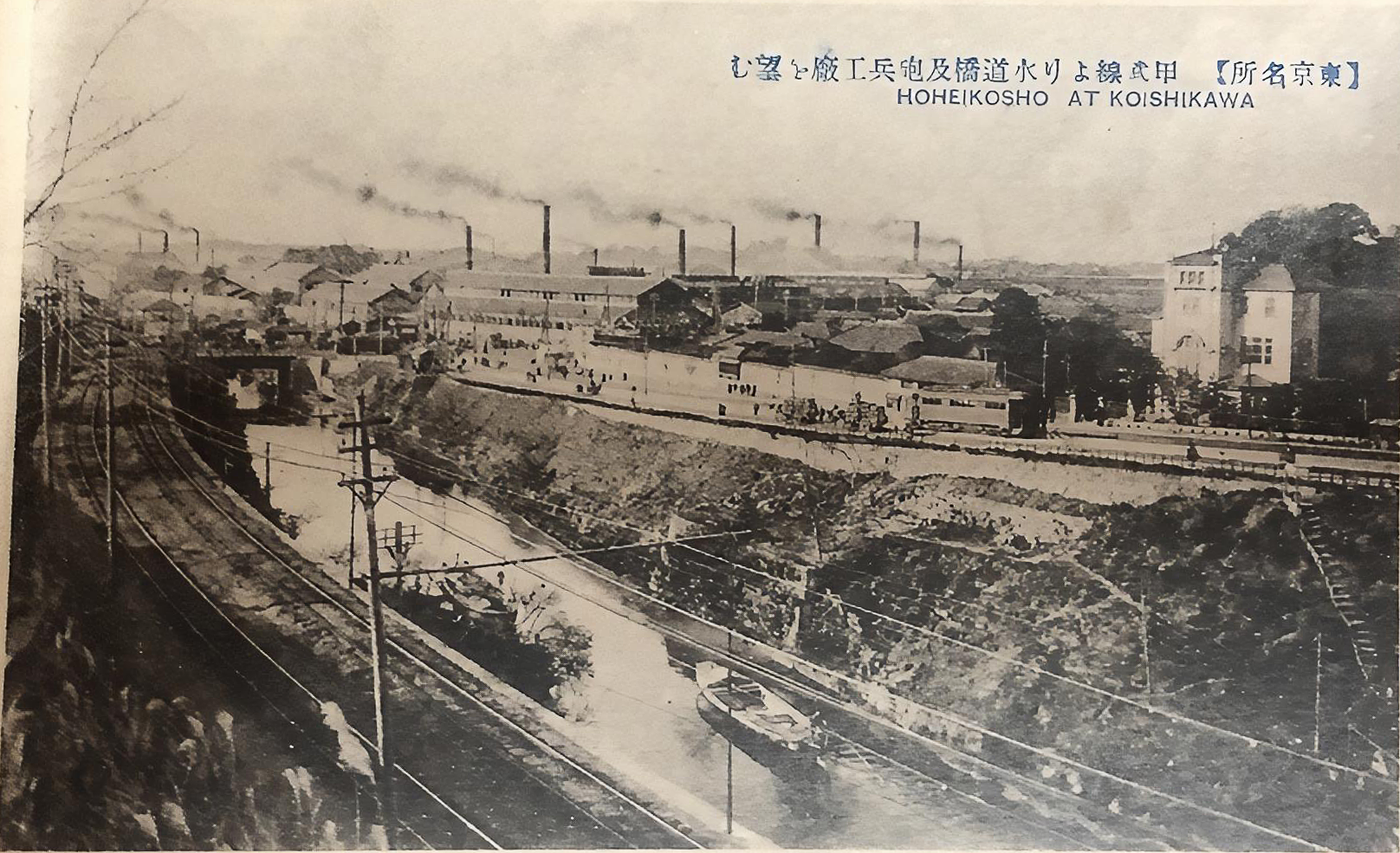
The Tokyo Koishikawa Arsenal was established in 1871.

To reform the military, the government instituted nationwide conscription in 1873, mandating that every male would serve for four years in the armed forces upon turning 21 years old, followed by three more years in the reserves. One of the primary differences between the samurai and peasant classes was the right to bear arms; this ancient privilege was suddenly extended to every male in the nation. Furthermore, samurai were no longer allowed to walk about town bearing a sword or weapon to show their status.

This led to a series of riots from disgruntled samurai. One of the major riots was the one led by Saigō Takamori, the Satsuma Rebellion, which eventually turned into a civil war. This rebellion was, however, put down swiftly by the newly formed Imperial Japanese Army, trained in Western tactics and weapons, even though the core of the new army was the Tokyo police force, which was largely composed of former samurai. This sent a strong message to the dissenting samurai that their time was indeed over. There were fewer subsequent samurai uprisings and the distinction became all but a name as the samurai joined the new society. The ideal of samurai military spirit lived on in romanticised form and was often used as propaganda during the early 20th-century wars of the Empire of Japan.

However, it is equally true that the majority of samurai were content despite having their status abolished. Many found employment in the government bureaucracy, which resembled an elite class in its own right. The samurai, being better educated than most of the population, became teachers, gun makers, government officials, and/or military officers. While the formal title of samurai was abolished, the elitist spirit that characterised the samurai class lived on.

The oligarchs also embarked on a series of land reforms. In particular, they legitimised the tenancy system which had been going on during the Tokugawa period. Despite the bakufu's best efforts to freeze the four classes of society in place, during their rule villagers had begun to lease land out to other farmers, becoming rich in the process. This greatly disrupted the clearly defined class system which the bakufu had envisaged, partly leading to their eventual downfall.

The military of Japan, strengthened by nationwide conscription and emboldened by military success in both the First Sino-Japanese War and the Russo-Japanese War, began to view themselves as a growing world power.

== Aftermath ==
=== Centralisation ===
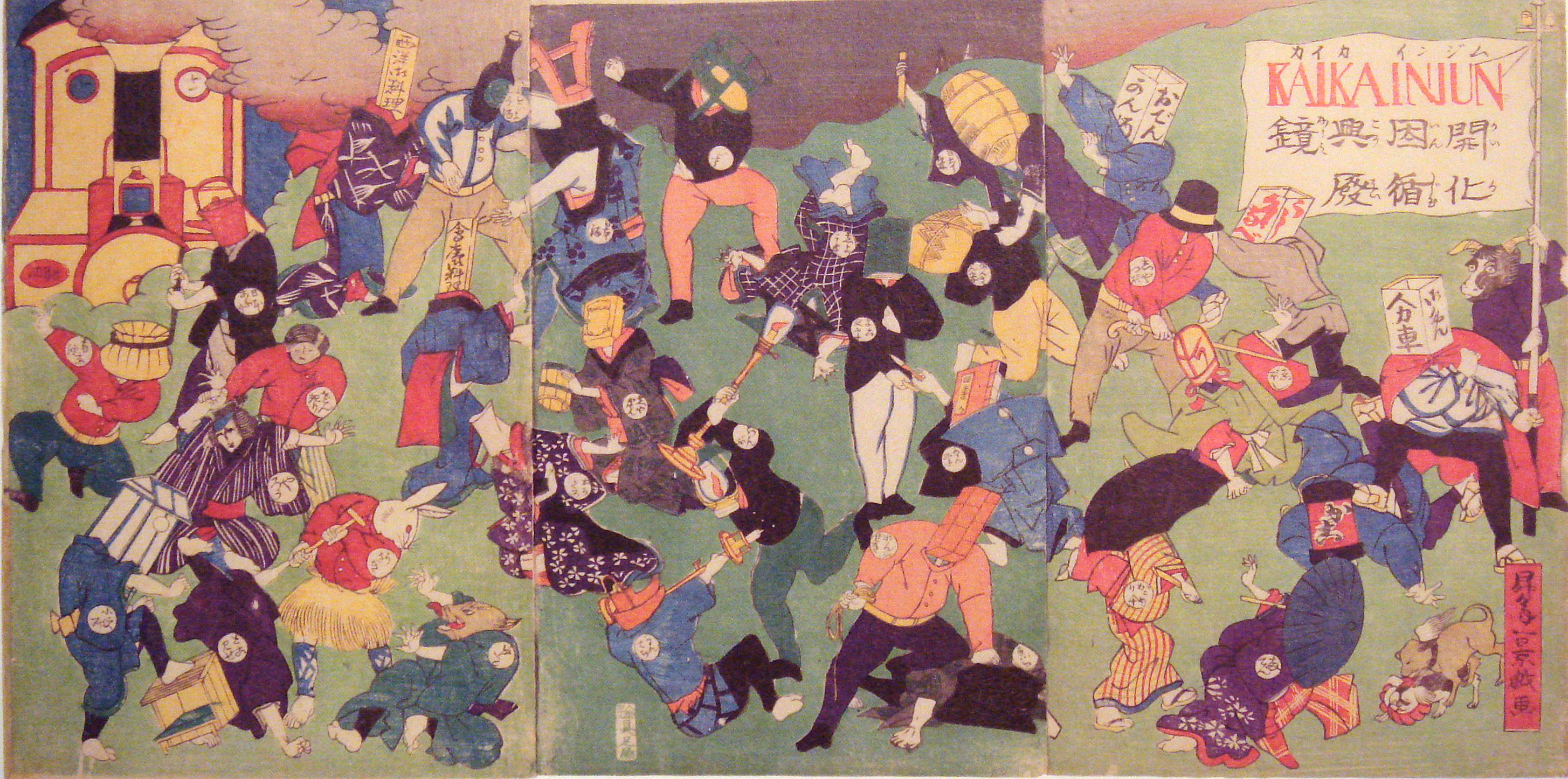
Allegory of the New fighting the Old, in early Japan Meiji, around 1870

Besides drastic changes to the social structure of Japan, in an attempt to create a strong centralised state defining its national identity, the government established a dominant national dialect, called "standard language" (標準語, hyōjungo), that replaced local and regional dialects and was based on the patterns of Tokyo's samurai classes. This dialect eventually became the norm in the realms of education, media, government, and business.

The Meiji Restoration, and the resultant modernisation of Japan, also influenced Japanese self-identity with respect to its Asian neighbors, as Japan became the first Asian state to modernise based on the Western model, replacing the traditional Confucian hierarchical order that had persisted previously under a dominant China with one based on modernity. Adopting Enlightenment ideals of popular education, the Japanese government established a national system of public schools. These free schools taught students reading, writing, and mathematics. Students also attended courses in "moral training" which reinforced their duty to the Emperor and to the Japanese state. By the end of the Meiji period, attendance in public schools was widespread, increasing the availability of skilled workers and contributing to the industrial growth of Japan.

The opening up of Japan not only consisted of the ports being opened for trade, but also began the process of merging members of the different societies together. Examples of this include western teachers and advisors immigrating to Japan and Japanese nationals moving to western countries for education purposes. All these things in turn played a part in expanding the people of Japan's knowledge on western customs, technology and institutions. Many people believed it was essential for Japan to acquire western "spirit" in order to become a great nation with strong trade routes and military strength.

=== Industrial growth ===
The Meiji Restoration accelerated the industrialisation process in Japan, which led to its rise as a military power by the year 1895, under the slogan of "Enrich the country, strengthen the military" (富国強兵, fukoku kyōhei).

There were a few factories set up using imported technologies in the 1860s, principally by Westerners in the international settlements of Yokohama and Kobe, and some local lords, but these had relatively small impacts. It was only in the 1870s that imported technologies began to play a significant role, and only in the 1880s did they produce more than a small output volume. In Meiji Japan, raw silk was the most important export commodity, and raw silks exports experienced enormous growth during this period, overtaking China. Revenue from silk exports funded the Japanese purchase of industrial equipment and raw materials. Although the highest quality silk remained produced in China, and Japan's adoption of modern machines in the silk industry was slow, Japan was able to capture the global silk market due to standardised production of silk. Standardisation, especially in silkworm egg cultivation, yielded more consistency in quality, particularly important for mechanized silk weaving. Since the new sectors of the economy could not be heavily taxed, the costs of industrialisation and necessary investments in modernisation heavily fell on the peasant farmers, who paid extremely high land tax rates (about 30 percent of harvests) as compared to the rest of the world (double to seven times of European countries by net agricultural output). In contrast, land tax rates were about 2% in Qing China. The high taxation gave the Meiji government considerable leeway to invest in new initiatives.

During the Meiji period, powers such as Europe and the United States helped transform Japan and made them realise a change needed to take place. Some leaders went out to foreign lands and used the knowledge and government writings to help shape and form a more influential government within their walls that allowed for things such as production. Despite the help Japan received from other powers, one of the key factors in Japan's industrialising success was its relative lack of resources, which made it unattractive to Western imperialism. The farmer and the samurai classification were the base and soon the problem of why there was a limit of growth within the nation's industrial work. The government sent officials such as the samurai to monitor the work that was being done. Because of Japan's leaders taking control and adapting Western techniques it has remained one of the world's largest industrial nations.

The rapid industrialisation and modernisation of Japan both allowed and required a massive increase in production and infrastructure. Japan built industries such as shipyards, iron smelters, and spinning mills, which were then sold to well-connected entrepreneurs. Consequently, domestic companies became consumers of Western technology and applied it to produce items that would be sold cheaply in the international market. With this, industrial zones grew enormously, and there was a massive migration to industrialising centres from the countryside. Industrialisation additionally went hand in hand with the development of a national railway system and modern communications.

Annual average raw silk production and export from Japan (in tons)
Year(s)	Production	Exports
1868–1872	1026	646
1883	1682	1347
1889–1893	4098	2444
1899–1903	7103	4098
1909–1914	12460	9462

With industrialisation came the demand for coal. There was dramatic rise in production, as shown in the table below.

Coal production
Year	In millions of metric tons	In millions of long tons	In millions of short tons
1875	0.6	0.59	0.66
1885	1.2	1.2	1.3
1895	5	4.9	5.5
1905	13	13	14
1913	21.3	21.0	23.5

Coal was needed for steamships and railroads. The growth of these sectors is shown below.

Size of the merchant fleet
Year	Number of steamships
1873	26
1894	169
1904	797
1913	1,514

Length of train track
Year	mi	km
1872	18	29
1883	240	390
1887	640	1,030
1894	2,100	3,400
1904	4,700	7,600
1914	7,100	11,400

=== Destruction of cultural heritage ===
The majority of Japanese castles were partially or completely dismantled in the late 19th century in the Meiji restoration by the national government. Since the feudal system was abolished and the fiefs (han) theoretically reverting to the emperor, the national government saw no further use for the upkeep of these now obsolete castles. The military was modernised and some parts of the castles were converted into modern military facilities with barracks and parade grounds, such as Hiroshima Castle. Others were handed over to the civilian authorities to build their new administrative structures. Some however were explicitly saved from destruction by interventions from various persons and parties such as politicians, government and military officials, experts, historians, and locals who feared a loss of their cultural heritage. In the case of Hikone Castle, even though the government ordered its dismantling, it was saved by orders from the emperor himself. Nagoya Castle and Nijo Castle, due to their historical and cultural importance and sheer size and strategic locations, both became official imperial detached palaces, before they were turned over to the local authorities in the 1930s. Others such as Himeji Castle survived by luck.

During the Meiji restoration's shinbutsu bunri, tens of thousands of Japanese Buddhist religious idols and temples were smashed and destroyed. Japan then closed and shut down tens of thousands of traditional old Shinto shrines in the Shrine Consolidation Policy and the Meiji government built the new modern 15 shrines of the Kenmu restoration as a political move to link the Meiji restoration to the Kenmu restoration for their new State Shinto cult.

=== Outlawing of traditional practices ===
In the blood tax riots, the Meiji government put down revolts by Japanese samurai angry that the traditional untouchable status of burakumin was legally revoked.

Under the Meiji Restoration, the practices of the samurai classes, deemed feudal and unsuitable for modern times following the end of sakoku in 1853, resulted in a number of edicts intended to modernise the appearance of upper class Japanese men. With the Dampatsurei Edict of 1871 issued by Emperor Meiji during the early Meiji Era, men of the samurai classes were forced to cut their hair short, effectively abandoning the chonmage (chonmage) hairstyle.

During the Meiji Restoration, the practice of cremation and Buddhism were condemned and the Japanese government tried to ban cremation but were unsuccessful, then tried to limit it in urban areas. The Japanese government reversed its ban on cremation and pro-cremation Japanese adopted western European arguments on how cremation was good for limiting disease spread, so the Japanese government lifted their attempted ban in May 1875 and promoted cremation for diseased people in 1897.

=== Use of foreign specialists ===
Even before the Meiji Restoration, the Tokugawa shogunate government hired German diplomat Philipp Franz von Siebold as diplomatic advisor, Dutch naval engineer Hendrik Hardes for Nagasaki Arsenal and Willem Johan Cornelis, Ridder Huijssen van Kattendijke for Nagasaki Naval Training centre, French naval engineer François Léonce Verny for Yokosuka Naval Arsenal, and Scottish civil engineer Richard Henry Brunton. Most of them were appointed through government approval with two or three years contract, and took their responsibility properly in Japan, except some cases. Then many other foreign specialists were hired.

Despite the value they provided in the modernisation of Japan, the Japanese government did not consider it prudent for them to settle in Japan permanently. After their contracts ended, most of them returned to their country except some, like Josiah Conder and W. K. Burton.

== Legacy ==
=== Cultural references ===
Shimazaki Tōson's epic novel Before the Dawn reflects many of the concerns of the era, particularly drawing from the intellectual nativism of kokugaku and the hierarchical structure of society in "a certainty of place and identity" during the Meiji Restoration. Akira Kurosawa's 1961 film, Yojimbo follows a wandering rōnin during the late Edo period, depicting themes of social tension and the displacement of the samurai class by modernisation and the new money economy. The 2021 film Rurouni Kenshin: The Beginning (based on the 1990s manga series by Nobuhiro Watsuki) depicts a fictionalised retelling of the era during the 1860s until the Battle of Toba-Fushimi.

== See also ==
- Datsu-A Ron
- Four Hitokiri of the Bakumatsu
- Land Tax Reform (Japan 1873)
- Japanese military modernization of 1868–1931
- Meiji Constitution
- Ōka shugi
