= Europeanisation =

Adoption and spread of European styles and norms

The flag of Europe

Europeanisation (or Europeanization, see spelling differences) refers to a number of related phenomena and patterns of change:

- The process in which a notionally non-European subject (be it a culture, a language, a city or a nation) adopts a number of European features (often related to Westernisation).
- Outside the social sciences, it commonly refers to the growth of a European continental identity or polity over and above national identities and polities on the continent.
- Europeanization also means a trend in Orthodox countries (Russia and the Balkans) catching up with and becoming similar to Western Europe in terms of political system, social system, culture, dress codes, artistic styles, economy, infrastructure, technology, and basic rules of behaviour from the 19th century to the first half of the 20th century.
- Europeanisation may also refer to the process through which European Union political and economic dynamics become part of the organisational logic of national politics and policy-making.

== Definitions ==
Europeanisation in political science has been referred to very generally as 'becoming more European like'. More specifically than this, it has been defined in a number of ways. One of the earliest conceptualisations of the term is by Ladrech (1994, 69), who defines Europeanisation simply as ‘an incremental process of re-orienting the direction and shape of politics to the extent that EC political and economic dynamics become part of the organisational logic of national politics and policy making.’

This emphasises what is known as the 'top-down approach' to Europeanisation, in which change emanates from the impact of the Union on the national policy. The state is viewed as reactive to the actions of the Union. Another definition that needs to be taken into account is from Radaelli, who describes Europeanisation as "a process involving a) construction, b) diffusion and c) institutionalisation of formal and informal rules, procedures, policy paradigms, styles, 'ways of doing things' and shared beliefs and norms which are first defined and consolidated in the EU policy process and then incorporated in the logic of domestic (national and subnational) discourse, political structures and public choices." More recently, Moumoutzis (2011: 612) has revised Radaelli's definition, arguing that Europeanisation should be defined as 'a process of incorporation in the logic of domestic (national and sub-national) discourse, political structures and public policies of formal and informal rules, procedures, policy paradigms, styles, “ways of doing things” and shared beliefs and norms that are first defined in the EU policy processes'.

From a 'bottom-up' approach, Europeanisation occurs when states begin to affect the policy of the European Union in a given area. A more nuanced analysis posits that the institutional interaction of policy actors at the various levels of European governance leads to the re-definition of national, regional and other identities within a European context, where the multiple levels of governance in Europe are not seen as necessarily in opposition to one another. An elected representative can, for example, see his loyalties and responsibilities as lying with Barcelona, Spain, and Europe, or with Amsterdam, Netherlands, and Europe, for unitary states. Some scholars, including Samuel Huntington, argue that citizens of European states increasingly identify themselves as such, rather than Portuguese, British, French, German, Italian, etc. An obvious area of change is in the institutions of Europe; the enlargement of the European Union and the gradual acquisition of authority over the national member governments in numerous areas is creating a centralised European polity. The Economic and Monetary Union of the European Union would be an example of this; in this case, the nations using the euro have passed control of their monetary policy to the European Central Bank.

Another perspective of Europeanisation is the 'horizontal approach.' This approach takes into account the transfer of politics, policies and policy-making between member states of the European Union. The transfer is based on a form of 'soft law' — it is not enforceable but based on 'best practice' and mutual recognition.

Whether Europeanisation is a continuing process that will eventually lead to a full European government or whether centralisation will be unable to overcome persisting national identities and/or increasing interest in localism is a matter of some debate.

== See also ==
- European integration
- Eurosphere
- Pan-European identity
- Pro-Europeanism
- Globalisation
- Accession of Turkey to the European Union
- Ukraine–European Union relations
- Ōka shugi
- Euro-Slavism
