= Fujita Yūkoku =

Fujita Yūkoku 藤田幽谷
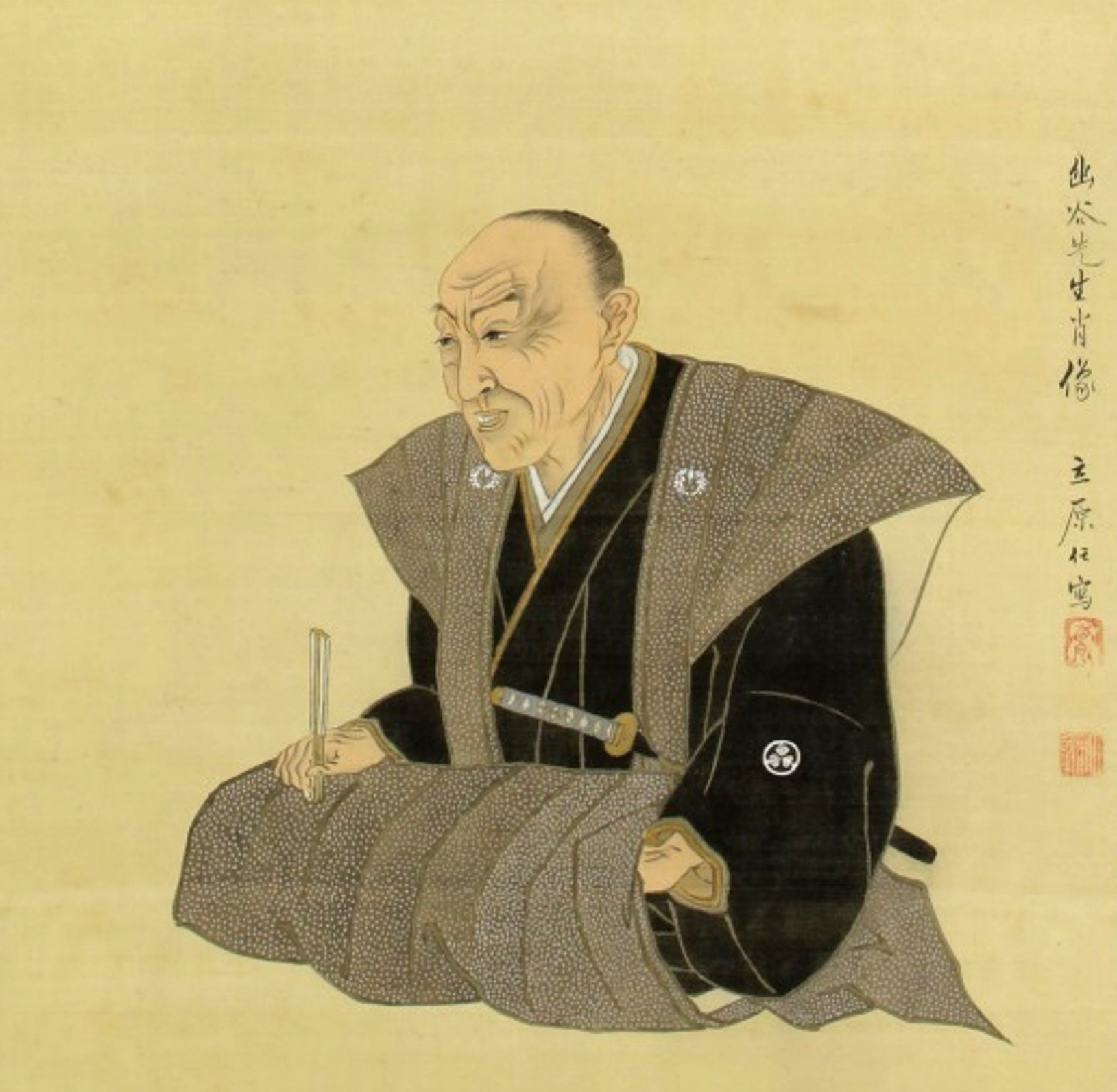
- Posthumous portrait, 1869
- Born: 29 March 1774; Mito Domain, Hitachi Province, Tokugawa Shogunate
- Died: 29 December 1836 (aged 62)
- Occupation(s): Samurai, intellectual

Japanese name
- Kyūjitai: 藤田幽谷

Fujita Yūkoku (藤田幽谷; 29 March 1774 – 29 December 1836) was a prominent samurai scholar of the Mito School during the mid-late Edo period and master of the domain's school, the Shōkōkan.

== Life ==
Born as the son of an old clothes dealer, he was a student of Tachihara Suiken. After joining the Shōkōkan he was patronised by Tokugawa Mitsukuni to compile the Dai Nihon Shi. His contributions as a Neo-Confucian scholar influenced successive generations of samurai intellectuals and the ideological programme of many of the reformers in the Meiji Revolution. He was the first to use the phrase fukoku kyōhei (rich nation, strong army) to alleviate the problems of naiyu gaikan, "troubles at home and dangers abroad". His understanding of this phrase, however, was different to its later use. He instead advocated for asceticism, implying that a rich Japan would arise from a return to agrarianism and discouraging urban life, while a strong army could be formed from the restoration of morale and encouragement of moral virtue among the samurai class. He had a son named Fujita Tōko, also a samurai intellectual of the Mito School, who assisted in supporting the reform efforts of Tokugawa Nariaki and in the promotion of the sonnō jōi movement.
