= Shiga Shigetaka =

Japanese geographer (1863–1927)

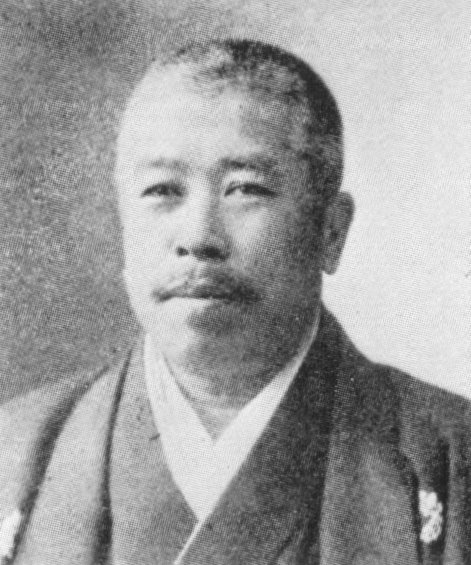
Shiga Shigetaka

Shiga Shigetaka (志賀 重昂; 15 September 1863 – 6 April 1927) was the editor of the magazine Nihonjin during the Meiji period, in which he argued against extreme Westernization (Japanese: 欧化主義).

== Biography ==
He was born in Yasuo-cho, Okazaki, Mikawa Province (present-day Okazaki City, Aichi Prefecture ), on 15 September 1863. He was the eldest son of Shiga Jūshoku, a Confucian scholar of the domain school of the Okazaki Domain. After Jūshoku died in 1868, he was raised in the Matsushita family, the home of his mother, Yoshiko. His maternal grandfather, Matsushita Kyūdai, was poor but came from a well-respected lineage of Confucian scholars that influence Shiga into adulthood.

In 1874, he studied English, mathematics, and Chinese studies at Kogyokusha high school and withdrew from the school in 1878. After studying with Takato Egi for a while, he went on to the Tokyo University and studied there for about two years. In 1880, he transferred to Sapporo Agricultural College. Uchimura Kanzō and others were in his third grade. In later years, he met Michimasa Miyazaki, Kumataro Kikuchi, and Saburo Kawato, who all became members of Seikyosha. While in school, he traveled around the mountains and fields of Hokkaido and various parts of Aomori Prefecture. He developed an interest in politics.

In 1884, he graduated from Sapporo Agricultural College, was in charge of botanical studies at Nagano Prefectural Junior High School, worked as a teacher at Nagano Prefectural Junior High School, and also taught geography as a lecturer at Nagano Prefectural Normal School. However, he resigned the following year due to trouble with the prefectural governor, Seiichiro Kinashi, at a bar, and went to Tokyo to work for Maruzen. At the end of the same year, he boarded the naval academy's training ship HMS Malacca (1853) to explore the situation of the British occupation of Geomundo, and inspected the Tsushima area, which was tense over the territorial dispute. In 1886, he took advantage of the HMS Malacca again and toured the islands of the South Pacific (Caroline Islands, Australia, New Zealand, Fiji, Samoa, and the Hawaiian Islands) for 10 months; he published the "Current State of Affairs in the South Seas (南洋時事, Nanyo Jiji)" in the following year, reporting on the situation of the colonization competition of the great powers and warning the world, which later led to the Nanshin-ron. Because of this book, he was recommended as an honorary member for life of the Tokyo Geographic Society.

After that, he taught geography at the Tokyo English School run by Shigetake Sugiura, and in April 1888, he organized Seikyosha with other members and launched the bulletin "Nihonjin" as an editor. He advocated nationalism, but it was not an exclusive idea that praised all of Japan and rejected all foreign countries, but according to Shigetaka, it was as follows. "We must protect the systems of religion, morality, art, politics, and production by preserving the national essence, but I am not saying that Japan should continue to preserve the old ways. However, Western civilization should be chewed and digested before being adopted.."

In 1889, he put up an argument to criticize the inadequacies of Ōkuma Shigenobu's bill to revise the treaties with the west, and formed the opposition movement 'Nippon Club'. In 1893, Yone Noguchi, the father of Isamu Noguchi and later a poet, lodged at his house. During the First Sino-Japanese War that began in August 1894, he advocated "independent diplomacy" as a representative of the more than 120 newspaper and magazine alliances. This year he married Tetsuchiyo Matsuno. He published a long-selling book, "The Japanese Landscape".

In 1895, he became a lecturer at Tokyo Senmon Gakko and taught geography. He also taught for a long time at Atomi Girls' School, the school where his wife Tetsuchiyo graduated, and often attended the Atomi Alumni Association with his wife. In 1896, he became an honorary secretary of the political Party Shimpotō. In 1897, he assumed the post of Director General of the Forestry Bureau of the Ministry of Agriculture and Commerce, but was dismissed on disciplinary action after criticizing the cabinet.

In 1898, he became an Imperial Advisor to the Ministry of Foreign Affairs in the first Okuma Cabinet and worked hard to make Minamitorishima a Japanese territory, but in the fall he resigned due to the resignation of the Cabinet en masse and became a member of the Kensei Hontō. He gradually withdrew from the Seikyosha. In 1899, he was dispatched by the Kensei Hontō to inspect Xiamen and the Yangtze River basin. In 1900, he moved to Rikken Seiyūkai and edited the party bulletin.

In 1902 (Meiji 35), he ran as a member of the House of Representatives as a member of the Seiyukai, but in 1904 he lost the election and left politics to concentrate on geography. He watched the Russo-Japanese War in Incheon, Seoul, and Lushun for about half a year. He worked mainly as a diplomatic adviser and interpreter at the headquarters of the Third Army, and was treated by the military commander, Nogi Maresuke. He was a lecturer at Matsumoto Kimpei's Tokyo Political School.

In 1905, he visited Sakhalin with the qualification of chief of theTokyo Geographic Society and secretary of the Japan Fisheries Association. He also toured the Okinawa Islands on the coastal defense ship Matsue. The following year, he attended the Russo-Japanese Committee held in Aleksandrovsk-Sakhalinsky regarding the possession of Southern Karafuto, and spent about half a year surveying, logging, and photographing the island.

In 1907 and 1908, he went to Korea. In 1910, he boarded the Japanese cruiser Ikoma and traveled around the world.

In 1911, he became a professor at Waseda University, where he remained until his death. He was recommended as an honorary member of the Japanese Alpine Club. In 1912, he traveled to California and the Hawaiian Islands. In 1914, he traveled to Hawaii, Canada, Washington DC, Cuba, and Mexico. In 1915, he traveled to Manchuria and Mongolia.

In 1917, he became an honorary member of the British Royal Geographical Society. In 1922, he toured Southern Africa and South America. In 1923, he toured India, the Middle East, Europe, and North America, paying attention to the oil situation in the Middle East and the Arab-Israeli problem.

In March 1927, he died after undergoing surgery for left knee arthritis. He was 63 years old. He held his funeral at Aoyama Funeral Hall. His posthumous name was Shokoin Hagikawa Nichijou Koji.

== Death and legacy ==
According to his will, his grave is located at Sogenji Temple in Shimotakaido, Suginami Ward, Tokyo . His birthplace, Seson-ji Temple in Kakemachi, Okazaki City, is part of his bones. Higashitenjikusan Seson-ji Temple is a temple completed in October 1928 by the locals in accordance with Shigetaka's plan but not fulfilled. In the neighboring Higashi Park in Okazaki City, there is also 'Nanboku-tei', which was relocated in 1929 from the pavilion that Shigetaka had established in his residence in Tokyo in 1911.

The name of the Nippon Line was named by Shigetaka in 1913 (Taisho 2). A monument is built at Yusenji Temple in Minokamo City. In addition, the name of Ena Gorge was named by Shigetaka in 1923.

On 1 July 1961, he was nominated as an honorary citizen of Okazaki City

== Works ==
=== Books ===
「南洋時事」、丸善(1887.4)→ 「日本の地理学文献選集1第1巻」、クレス出版(2007.5)に収録

「History of nations」、丸善(1888)

「地理学講義」、敬業社(1889.8)→ 「日本の地理学文献選集1第1巻」、クレス出版(2007.5)に収録

「古代史」、(「史学」、東京文学院(1890)(講義録])」に収録

「日本風景論」、政教社(1894.10)→ 岩波文庫(1995)ISBN 4003311213 → 一穂社 名著古典籍文庫(2004.12)ISBN 9784861810114

「河及湖沢」、政教社 山水叢書(1897.1)→ 増補5版、文武堂(1901.5)→ 「明治後期産業発達史資料第666巻、龍溪書舎(2003.3)」に収録

「地理学」、東京専門学校(1897.4)(以降1901年頃まで、同じ書名で年度ごとの講義録を刊行)

「内外地理学講義」、谷島屋書店(1899.1)

「新万国地図 5版」、丸善(1900.8)

「地理學講義 11版」、文武堂(1901.11)

「中学地理. 日本之部」、冨山房(1903.4)

「地理教科書 本邦篇 訂2版」、冨山房(1904.1)→ 新訂(1911)

「地理教科書 外國篇 上中下」、冨山房(1904.1)→ 再訂改版(1906)

「地理講話」、早稲田大学出版部 早稲田通俗講話6(1906.12)

「最新地図本邦之部」、冨山房(1908)

「最新地図世界之部」、冨山房(1908)

「大役小志」、東京堂・博文館(1909.11)(旅順港従軍・樺太踏破ほか)

「世界写真図説. 雪」、地理調査会(1911.7)

「世界山水図説」、冨山房(1911.9)

「旅順攻囲軍」、東京堂(1912.3)

「続世界山水図説」、冨山房(1916)

「国民当用世界当代地理」、金尾文淵堂(1918.7)

「知られざる国々」、地理調査会(1926.11)→ 日本評論社 明治文化叢書6(1943)

=== Complete works compilation ===
志賀冨士男編: 「志賀重昂全集」全8巻、志賀重昂全集刊行会(1927.12 - 1929.3)→ 日本図書センター(1995.2)

== See also ==
- National essentialism
