= Fujita Tōko =

Fujita Tōko 藤田東湖
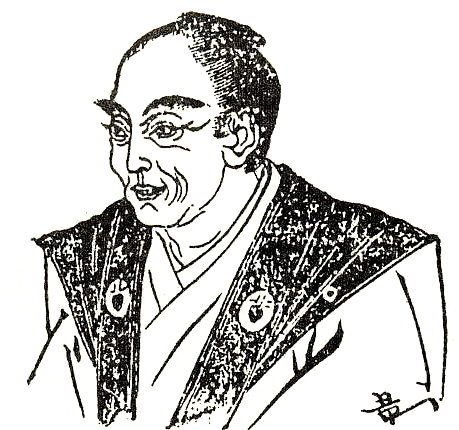
- Born: 4 May 1806; Mito Domain, Hitachi Province, Tokugawa Shogunate
- Died: 11 November 1855 (aged 49)
- Occupations: Samurai, intellectual
- Father: Fujita Yūkoku

Fujita Tōko (藤田東湖; 4 May 1806 – 11 November 1855) was an influential samurai scholar who was considered a major representative of the Mito School during the late Edo period. His work would formalise an understanding of the kokutai, the national polity of the late Tokugawa shogunate.

== Biography ==
Fujita Tōko was born in 1806 as Fujita Yūkoku's only son. He served at the Mito School domain academy (the Shōkōkan from 1827. Along with Aizawa Seishisai, he successfully campaigned in favour of Tokugawa Nariaki becoming daimyō of the domain when a succession dispute arose in 1829. The shogunate reprimanded Nariaki in 1844, which also led to Fujita being kept under house arrest until 1849. During this time he wrote various ideological tracts. He died in 1855.

== Thought ==
Fujita was a Confucian scholar. His thought was important in formalising the conception of the Japanese national polity (kokutai).

In 1845 he wrote the Hitachi-obi, examining foreign policy proposals in light of the Britain's defeat of China in the First Opium War. His argument rejected thought that advocated for foreign appeasement and the importation of western thought on the grounds that it would corrupt the national spirit. Simultaneously, he also rejected advocating open warfare, in favour instead of jōi, an expulsion of foreigners that would act as the immediate stage, followed by kaikoku (opening the country). Kaikoku would be the mechanism by which Japan could reform itself and engage with the world equally. This thought was considered atypical among samurai intellectuals of the time.

Fujita was fervently anti-Christian. He advocated for the defence of Ezo and petitioning the shogunate to allow the domains to build ships capable of sailing across the open ocean. Any training in foreign studies was intended to subordinate it to native thought and should be prevented from being disseminated among the people.
