= Gilberto Conchas =

American sociologist of education

Gilberto Q. Conchas

Academic background
- Education: University of California, Berkeley (BA); University of Michigan (MA, PhD)

Academic work
- Discipline: Sociology
- Sub-discipline: Sociology of education
- Institutions: Pennsylvania State University
- Main interests: Urban education, race and schooling, Latino students
- Notable works: The Color of Success (2006); Streetsmart Schoolsmart (2012); The Chicana/o/x Dream (2020)

Gilberto Q. Conchas is an American sociologist of education. He is the Wayne K. and Anita Woolfolk Hoy Endowed Professor of Education at Pennsylvania State University.

Conchas's first book, The Color of Success (2006), compared academies within an urban high school in northern California to examine the academic success of low-income students of color. His other books include Small Schools and Urban Youth (2008), on small learning communities; Streetsmart Schoolsmart (2012), on gangs and street socialization among boys; and The Chicana/o/x Dream (2020), on first-generation Chicana/o/x college students. He has also edited volumes on race and education policy, including When School Policies Backfire (2016) and Race Frames in Education (2022).

In 2022, Conchas received the Sylvia Hurtado University Faculty Award from the American Association of Hispanics in Higher Education.

== Early life and education ==
Conchas is the son of Mexican immigrant farmworkers. After attending public schools in Ventura and graduating from Ventura High School in 1988, he received a bachelor's degree in sociology from the University of California, Berkeley, and a master's degree and doctorate in sociology from the University of Michigan.

== Career ==
Conchas was an assistant professor at the Harvard Graduate School of Education, where in 2001 he received a National Academy of Education/Spencer Postdoctoral Fellowship. He later moved to the University of California, Irvine, where by 2008 he was an associate professor of education and chancellor's fellow. During the same period he was a senior program officer at the Bill & Melinda Gates Foundation in its postsecondary education program for low-income young people. He left UC Irvine as a full professor, and in 2020 joined Pennsylvania State University as the Wayne K. and Anita Woolfolk Hoy Endowed Professor of Education. In 2022 he received the Sylvia Hurtado University Faculty Award from the American Association of Hispanics in Higher Education.

== Research and work ==
=== Student success in urban schools ===
In his first book, The Color of Success: Race and High-Achieving Urban Youth (2006), Conchas studied low-income Black, Latina/o and Vietnamese American students at an urban high school in northern California, which the book calls Baldwin High School. He interviewed students and compared two academies within the school and its Advanced Placement track. The school's medical academy, which recruited "high-potential" students, produced cooperation across racial lines, while its more selective graphics academy produced competition. Conchas argued that social capital from peers and teachers shapes engagement and achievement, and recommended small school-within-a-school programs. In Urban Education, Vichet Chhuon and Francisco D. Carranza recommended it for courses on minority education and school reform. D. Brent Edwards Jr. and Derek Tyler found it refreshing for showing that low-income minority students can achieve at high levels and recommended it as an example of context-specific research. However, they wrote that the book did not define success. Mei-Ling N. Malone called it an important resource for educators. She argued, however, that exclusive programs of the kind it recommends perpetuate tracking. Conchas published a revised edition, The Color of Success 2.0, in 2024.

In Small Schools and Urban Youth (2008), co-authored with Louie F. Rodriguez, Conchas again studied Baldwin High School and compared its academies with small learning communities in Boston. The authors argued that relationships between students and teachers matter more to student success than school size, and that culture should take priority over size in urban school reform. Writing in the Harvard Educational Review, James P. Huguley called the book's evidence compelling, but pointed out that it was not a proof of a causal link. P. L. Yoder's review in Choice recommended the book as an introduction to restructuring large urban schools, but found little new thinking in its findings.

Streetsmart Schoolsmart was published in 2012. In it, Conchas and James Diego Vigil studied gangs and street socialization among low-income boys in Southern California. They argued that social capital gained from school and community can offset the effects of street socialization. Laurie A. Garo called the book a timely contribution. She recommended it for training teachers and administrators. However, she wrote that its interventions mainly served students already identified as capable. In the Journal of Youth and Adolescence, Alexander C. Howell wrote that he found its account of the pressures on urban boys convincing and useful for the study of adolescence. However, he saw little empirical evidence that the programs worked.

=== Latina/o students ===
Conchas's early work includes a 2001 Harvard Educational Review article arguing that cultural-ecological theory could not explain the wide variation in Latina/o students' school performance. He later edited Cracks in the Schoolyard (2016) with Briana M. Hinga, a collection of case studies of Latina/o educational success in California written by Latina/o scholars. In the introduction he argued that such scholars are well placed to understand Latina/o students. Billie Gastic wrote in the Journal of Latinos and Education that the book avoids simple solutions. D. L. Norland wrote that the book rejected deficit models and rated it highly recommended in Choice.

Conchas wrote The Chicana/o/x Dream with Nancy Acevedo. It is based on first-person accounts of first-generation Chicana/o/x students at community colleges and four-year universities. J. E. Perez in Choice and Diane Wu Chang in the Journal of College Student Retention wrote that the book would be useful to practitioners. Emily Ramos and Pedro E. Nava in their review of the book suggested that future work should include Afro-Chicanx, Indigenous and non-Californian students. The book received the American Association of Hispanics in Higher Education's 2021 Book of the Year award in the senior scholar category.

=== Race in education policy ===
Conchas and Michael A. Gottfried edited When School Policies Backfire (2016). It examines education policies that produced the opposite of their intended effect on disadvantaged students. In Public Administration Review, James V. Shuls called the editors' definition of backfire instructive but wrote that most contributors did not apply the definition consistently. He recommended the book for courses in education policy and public administration. P. M. Del Prado Hill, reviewing the book in Choice, recommended it to decision makers.

Conchas edited Race Frames in Education (2022) with Sophia Rodriguez. In the book, they apply Michael Omi and Howard Winant's racial formation theory to examine how education policies to promote equity can reproduce racial inequality. He edited Transforming Education for Social Justice (2025) with Mahmoud F. Suleiman and Victor DeAlba. In his co-authored chapter in the volume, based on interviews with first-generation Chinese, Korean and Vietnamese American college students, Conchas found that students' views of inequality varied with migration history and gender. Transforming Education for Social Justice received the 2026 Outstanding Book Award from the Society of Professors of Education.

=== Youth resistance ===
In 2025 Conchas and Miguel N. Abad edited two books on youth resistance. Youth Resistance for Educational Justice collects studies of how young people from racialized communities organize against injustice. Repertoires of Racial Resistance: Pedagogical Dreaming in Transborder Educational Spaces received the 2025 Critics' Choice Book Award from American Educational Studies Association.

== Selected publications ==
- Conchas, Gilberto Q. (2006). The Color of Success: Race and High-Achieving Urban Youth. New York: Teachers College Press. ISBN 978-0-8077-4660-8.
- Conchas, Gilberto Q.; Rodriguez, Louie F. (2008). Small Schools and Urban Youth: Using the Power of School Culture to Engage Students. Thousand Oaks, CA: Corwin Press. ISBN 978-1-4129-3934-8.
- Conchas, Gilberto Q.; Vigil, James Diego (2012). Streetsmart Schoolsmart: Urban Poverty and the Education of Adolescent Boys. New York: Teachers College Press. ISBN 978-0-8077-5318-7.
- Gottfried, Michael A.; Conchas, Gilberto Q., eds. (2016). When School Policies Backfire: How Well-Intended Measures Can Harm Our Most Vulnerable Students. Cambridge, MA: Harvard Education Press. ISBN 978-1-61250-907-5.
- Conchas, Gilberto Q.; Acevedo, Nancy (2020). The Chicana/o/x Dream: Hope, Resistance, and Educational Success. Cambridge, MA: Harvard Education Press. ISBN 978-1-68253-511-0.
