= Socialist China =

Socialist China may refer to:

- People's Republic of China
- China Democratic Socialist Party, a former political party in the Republic of China
- Chinese Communist Party
- Socialism with Chinese characteristics
- Socialist ideology of the Kuomintang
- Ideology of the Chinese Communist Party
- Core Socialist Values
