= Chinese socialism =

Chinese socialism may refer to:

- Ideology of the Chinese Communist Party, history of the ideology of the current governing party of China
  - Socialism with Chinese characteristics, current ideology of the Chinese Communist Party
  - Socialist market economy, form of socialist economy in China today
- Socialist ideology of the Kuomintang, from the period of the Republic of China before 1949
