= Ethnic nationalism in Japan =

Ethnic nationalism in Japan (Japanese: 民族主義, Hepburn: minzoku shugi) (Note: "民族主義" can also mean cultural nationalism depending on the context. Yanagita Kunio and other advocates of Japanese 'cultural nationalism' (民族主義) opposed 'state [ultra-]nationalism' ([超]国家主義).) or minzoku nationalism means nationalism that is espoused by members of Japan's dominant Yamato people or ethnic minorities.

In present-day Japan, statistics only count the size of their population in terms of nationality, rather than ethnicity, thus, the number of ethnic Yamato and the actual size of their community are ambiguous.

== Dominant ethnic-centered nationalism ==
"Japanese ethnic nationalism" (Japanese: 日本民族主義, Hepburn: nihon minzoku shugi) is related to minzoku (民族), the Japanese word that translates to "people", "ethnic group", and "nation". Minzoku does not originally mean "race" in the general sense, and jinshu (人種) means "race", but some Japanese nationalists also use minzoku in a closer sense to "race"; Taro Aso, Yasuhiro Nakasone has called Japan a "one race" or "one minzoku". Prominent Japanese politicians have often kindled controversies by invoking the images of Japanese racial superiority.

=== Minzoku-ha ===
Minzoku-ha (民族派, lit. "ethnic nationalist group") is a Japanese ethno-nationalist faction that emerged after postwar Japan. Minzoku-ha is considered to be the categories of Uyoku dantai.

=== Nihonjinron ===
Nihonjinron (日本人論: treatises on Japaneseness) is a genre of historical and literary work that focuses on issues of Japanese national and cultural identity.

=== Yamato nationalism ===
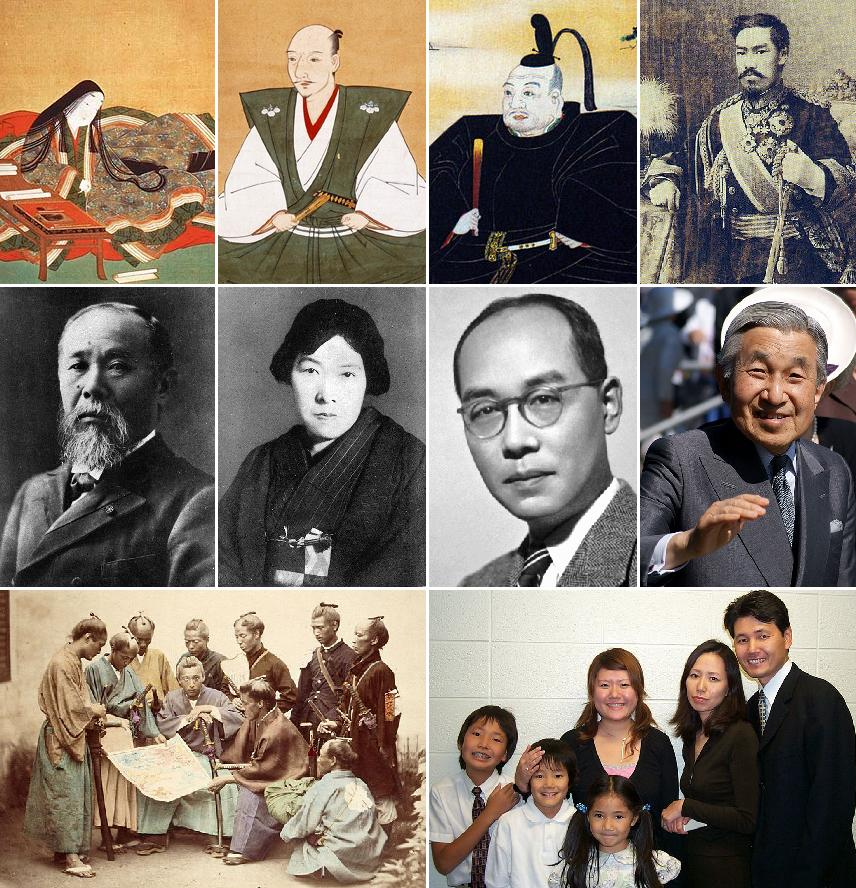
People of Yamato minzoku

"Yamato nationalism" (Japanese: 大和民族主義, Hepburn: yamato minzoku shugi) is an based on "Yamato people" (大和民族, yamato minzoku; literally "Yamato ethnicity" or "Yamato race"), the dominant population group in Japan.

During the Empire of Japan, Yamato nationalism is what inspired most Japanese soldiers and civilians at the time and made Japanese people feel racially superior to the Chinese people. Today, Yamato nationalism is deeply linked to xenophobic sentiment toward minority races/ethnic groups; due to the influence of Yamato nationalism, Zainichi Koreans who moved to Empire of Japan forcibly or voluntarily during the colonial Korea period and lived in Japan were not granted "citizenship" (国籍, kokuseki, lit: nationality) even after 1945.

During the late 1930s and early 1940s, as Japan's Yamato nationalism intensified into wartime hyper-nationalism, some ideologists such as Kingoro Hashimoto proposed a single-party dictatorship based on populism, patterned after European fascist movements. The regime's ethnic-centered expansionist ideology during this period is clearly illustrated in the 1943 secret report, An Investigation of Global Policy with the Yamato Race as Nucleus.

== Left-wing nationalism ==
During the Imperial Japanese period, Japanese Marxists opposed [imperialist] Japanese state nationalism and supported the [separatist/anti-imperialist] ethnic nationalism of Korea and Taiwan, and during the Cold War, some leftists regarded Japan as a colony of the United States, opposed anti-communist "state nationalism" (国家主義 or 国民主義), and supported anti-imperialist or anti-American "minzoku-based nationalism" (民族主義). However, in the 21st century, Japanese leftists generally distance themselves from nationalism (whether based on the "state" or on the "minzoku"), even while criticizing American imperialism.

== Ainu nationalism ==
Flag of Ainu people

"Ainu nationalism" (Japanese: アイヌ民族主義 or アイヌナショナリズム) is a means of asserting Ainu rights over ancestral land and today has been adopted as the favored term for Hokkaido.

The Ainu Party (アイヌ民族党, lit. "Ethnic Ainu Party" or "Ainu Nationals Party") is a political party that represents Ainu rights in Japan; it advocates Ainu "nationalism" (民族主義) and "multiculturalism" (多文化主義). Ainu Party supports post-nuclear, designating Ainu as an official language, and opposition to the Trans-Pacific Partnership.

== Okinawan nationalism ==
"Okinawan nationalism" (Japanese: 沖縄民族主義 or 沖縄ナショナリズム) claims the Ryukyuan people' own identity, also called "Okinawan people". Okinawan nationalism started when the Empire of Japan opposed the destruction of Ryukyu Kingdom and incorporation into its territory. Therefore, while Okinawan nationalism is deeply linked to the Ryukyu nationalism. However, not all Okinawan nationalists are Ryukyu nationalists; Ryukyu nationalists refer to separatists from Japan, but some Okinawan nationalists value regional rights within Japan.

Modern Okinawa nationalism often manifests itself through negative views of Marine Corps Air Station Futenma bases on the Ryukyu Islands. It is also often manifested by local leftists who oppose Japanese nationalism.

All Okinawa is a representative nationalist organization that requests the demolition of MCAS Futenma.

=== Ryukyu nationalism ===
The Ryukyu independence movement reflects ethnic tensions in Japan, with some Ryukyuans seeking sovereignty due to historical annexation and U.S. military presence, though most prefer autonomy over full independence.

== Historical ==
The Empire of Japan included Korea, Taiwan, and other colonies. In the colonies, there were anti-colonial nationalists who argued for "national self-determination" (Japanese: 民族自決) against Japanese imperialism.

=== Korean nationalism ===
Flag of the Provisional Government of the Republic of Korea

Early "Korean [ethnic] nationalism" (Japanese: 朝鮮民族主義, Korean: 조선민족주의) emerged in the form of "resistance nationalism" (Korean: 저항적 민족주의).

Traditionally, the concept of Japanese ethnic nationalism "blood" was emphasized. This form of nationalism was dominant in Empire of Japan and also influenced Korean ethnic nationalism.

==== Theory of self-governance ====
Some Korean nationalists, such as Yi Gwangsu and Choe Nam-seon, insisted on "theory of self-governance" (Japanese: 自治論, Korean: 자치론) rather than independence from Japan. They were criticized as pro-Japanese collaborators by radical nationalists who supported independence at the time.

=== Manchurian nationalism ===
Invading China through the Second Sino-Japanese War, the Empire of Japan established a puppet state called Manchukuo. They promoted "Manchurian nationalism" (Japanese: 満州族民族主義, Chinese: 滿族民族主義) in the Manchuria.

=== In Taiwan ===
Party flag of the Taiwanese People's Party

Under Japanese rule, "Taiwanese nationalism" (Japanese: 台湾民族主義, Chinese: 臺灣民族主義) was stimulated to some extent. However, Taiwanese identities were more complicated at the time, with some campaigning for independence based on Taiwanese nationalism, while others opposed Japanese rule using Chinese nationalism and identity, desiring re-annexation back to China. (Taiwanese identity favouring separation from China was strengthened by the February 28 incident that took place under Kuomintang after the end of Japanese colonial rule.)

Despite its history of colonial rule, Taiwan's anti-Japanese sentiment today is known to be significantly lower than that of Korea, because Empire of Japan guaranteed Taiwan relatively more autonomy compared to Korea.

==== Taiwanese–Chinese nationalism ====
The Taiwanese People's Party was a party that pursued extension of Taiwanese people's rights based on Chinese identity; whose platform adopted the Three Principles of the People, and along with it Chinese nationalism and Kuomintang-style socialism.

==== Taiwan independence ====
Taiwan independence movement (separated from both China and Japan) during the Japanese Empire at the time had something to do with communist or radical left movements; unlike today's Taiwan independence movement represented by Pan-Green Coalition, which was somewhat anti-communist (as an extension of anti-PRC sentiment), but today's Taiwan independence movement still contains Leninist conceptions of "self-determination" dating back to before 1945.

Mao Zedong was an early supporter of Taiwanese independence, telling Edgar Snow in the 1930s that the Chinese Communist Party would lend "our enthusiastic help in their struggle for independence." He changed this position only after the Nationalists started claiming Taiwan with the Cairo Declaration. The Taiwanese Communist Party also emphasized "Taiwanese nation" (臺灣民族) rather than "Chinese nation" (中華民族).

== See also ==
- Ethnic groups of Japan
- Ethnic nationalism in Russia
- Han nationalism / Local ethnic nationalism (China)
- Minjok (disambiguation) (Korea)
- Minzu (anthropology) (China)
- National essentialism
- Nihon shugi (日本主義, lit. "Japan-ism")
- Volk
  - Völkisch nationalism
