= Racial formation theory =

Sociological tool analyzing race as a fluid social construct

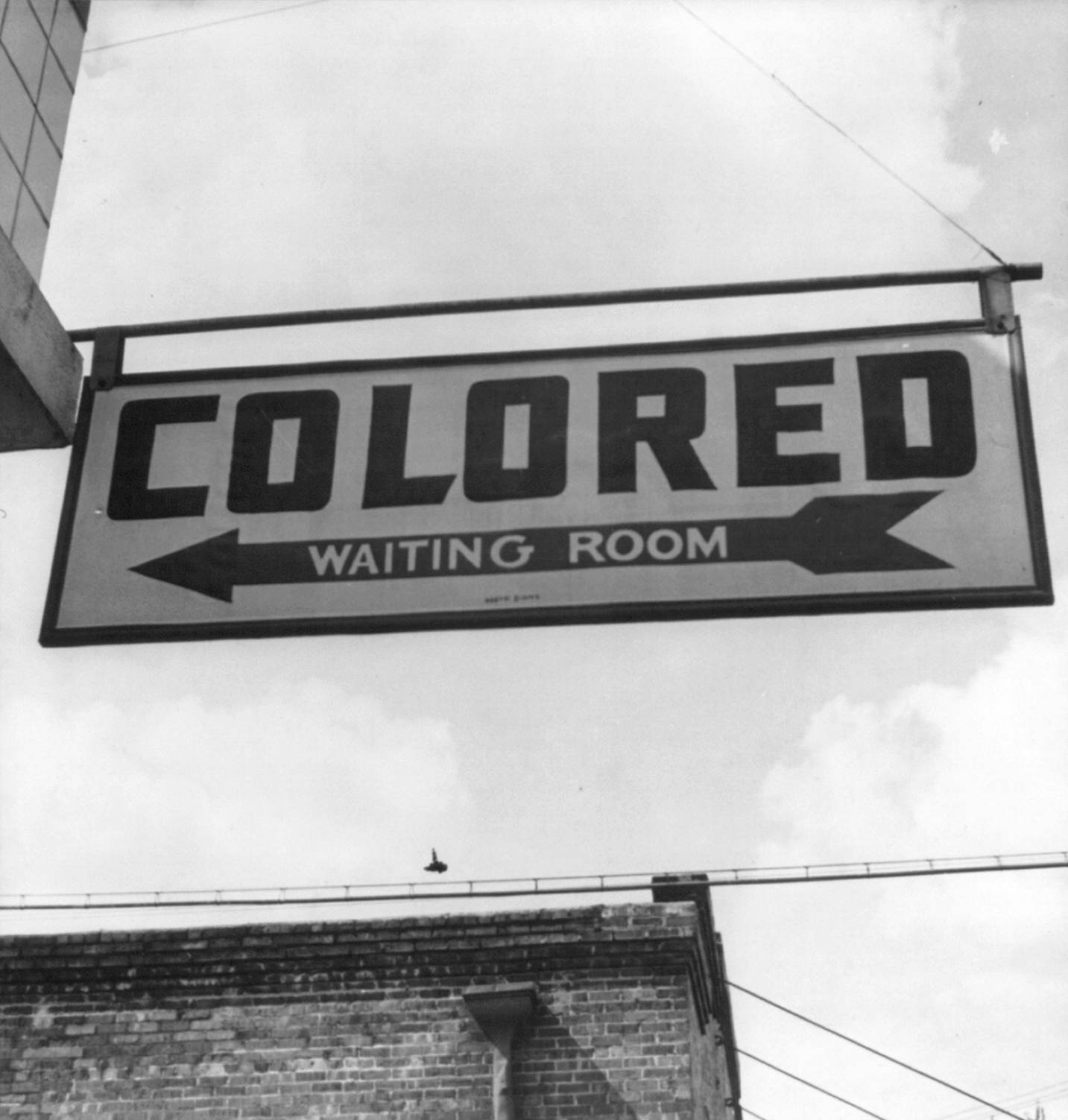
Colored Waiting Room" sign from segregationist era United States.

Racial formation theory is an analytical tool in sociology, developed by Michael Omi and Howard Winant, which is used to look at race as a socially constructed identity, where the content and importance of racial categories are determined by social, economic, and political forces. Unlike other traditional race theories, "In [Omi and Winant's] view, racial meanings pervade US society, extending from the shaping of individual racial identities to the structuring of collective political action on the terrain of the state".

== Race concept ==
In order to delve further into the topic of racial formation, practitioners explore the question of what "race" is. Racial formation theory is a framework that seeks to deconstruct race as it exists today in the United States. To do this, the authors first explore the historical development of race as a dynamic and fluid social construct. This goes against the dominant discourses on race, which see race as a static and unchanging concept based purely on physical and genetic criteria.

Instead of claiming race as something that is concrete, where the person's biology and upbringing are what shape racial identity, Omi and Winant suggest that race is something that is fluid, where "the racial order is organized and enforced by the continuity and reciprocity between micro level and macro-level of social relations".

They refer to it as "racial order" that is able to have meaning and a varying system due to a result of the way that people choose to interact with one another either it could be micro/macro level of social relations.

The "macro-level" social relations refer to the social structures and common ideologies of a society. Relevant social structures include collective organizations like businesses, the media, and the government, and the common ideologies include cultural and stereotypical beliefs on race, class, sexuality, and gender.

Omi and Winant also believe that "race [is] an unstable and 'de-centered' complex of social meanings constantly being transformed by political struggle". Because of this, people are able to constantly contest the definition of race both in the micro- and the macro-level.

== History ==
Throughout modern history, people have assigned identity based on race, both as a means of distinguishing one group from another, but more importantly as a means of control. The dominant culture assigns identity to minority groups as a means of separating them, diminishing their status, and maintaining control over them. Often, this distinction is made simply on the basis of skin color. Through this mechanism of assigning identity, race becomes a political weapon of the majority that has several limiting effects on the oppressed group:

- determines freedom of movement within the society
- limits upward mobility from class to class
- prohibits or minimizes economic gain
- has a psychological impact on how the oppressed individual perceives themselves and exists within the confines of the limiting social expectations that have been imposed upon them.

=== Racism as a justification for ethnocentrism ===
Omi and Winant argue that the concept of race developed gradually and was created to justify and explain inequality and genocide that is characteristic of European colonization. The expropriation of property, the denial of political rights, the introduction of slavery and other forms of coercive labor, as well as outright extermination, all presupposed a worldview which distinguished European – children of God, human beings, etc. – from "others". Such a worldview was needed to explain why some should be "free" and others enslaved, why some had rights to land while others did not. Race and the interpretation of racial differences were central factors in that worldview.

The need for a justification for institutionalized racial discrimination led to the "biological essentialist" framework. In this framework, White European Americans were viewed as being born inherently superior. Religious debates also flared over the role of race in definitions of humanity: "Arguments took place over creation itself, as theories of polygenesis questioned whether God had made only one species of humanity ('monogenesis')."

In their book Racial Formation, Omi and Winant present race as a relatively recent phenomenon in the United States. They describe how race becomes established in social consciousness, even without anyone having an explicit intention to perpetuate it:

Everybody learns some combination, some version, of the rules of racial classification, and of their own racial identity, often without obvious teaching or conscious inculcation. Race becomes 'common sense' – a way of comprehending, explaining, and acting in the world.

=== Scientific legitimacy ===
There was also a scientific preoccupation with the idea of race. Throughout the 19th and 20th centuries in particular, some of the most respected scientists of the time took up the question of racial superiority. Many of them concluded that White Europeans were, in fact, superior based on studies on everything from cranial capacity to social Darwinism.

This scientific debate was not, however, a purely academic one. It was a central icon of public fascination, often in the popular magazines of the time. Even today, scientists are still working on finding a genetic basis for racial categorization. None of these efforts has been successful in defining race in an empirical and objective way.

Racial formation theory examines race as a dynamic social construct with inherent structural barriers, ideologies and individual actions, whereas the biological essentialist understands individual deficiency as the basis for racial marginalization and oppression.

== Racial formation perspective ==
According to Omi and Winant, a "racial formation perspective" is needed to explain race as "an autonomous field of social conflict, political organizations, and cultural/ideological meaning". The second part of their book is an elaboration of this racial formation perspective.

Omi and Winant define "racial formation" as "the process by which social, economic and political forces determine the content and importance of racial categories, and by which they are in turn shaped by racial meanings". The racial formation perspective emphasizes the extent to which race is a social and political construction that operates at two levels, the micro (individual identity) and the macro (collective social structure). The two levels interact to form a racial social movement when individuals at the micro level are mobilized in response to political racial injustice at the macro level.

Becoming a citizen of this society is the process of learning to see race – that is, to ascribe social meanings and qualities to otherwise meaningless biological features. And in turn, race consciousness figures centrally in the building of a collective body of knowledge without which we could not make sense of the world around us – a body of knowledge that Omi and Winant call "racial common sense". That describes the associations we make between individual characteristics, preferences, behaviors, and attitudes and a particular physical appearance or perceived group membership.

Those expectations will guide all our daily interactions. Individuals that do not perform according to our racial expectations disrupt this micro-level process. Omi and Winant provide several illustrative examples of this disruption of expectations:

The black banker harassed by police while walking in casual clothes through his own well-off neighborhood, the Latino or white kid rapping in perfect Afro patois, the unending faux pas committed by whites who assume that the non-whites they encounter are servants or tradespeople, the belief that non-white colleagues are less qualified persons hired to fulfill affirmative action guidelines...

When our racial expectations are violated, our reactions can betray our "preconceived notions of a racialized social structure". There are many racial projects dispersed throughout society that "mediate between discursive or representational means in which race is identified and signified on the one hand, and the institutional and organizational forms in which is it routinized and standardized on the other".

== Media ==
The lens of looking at racial formation theory through media goes into the macro-level. Some sources of media include TV shows, movies, newspapers, music, magazines, advertisements, social media etc. Within these different forms they use racial formation theory to convey narratives of different societal groups, tailored to resonate with their intended audience.

Ad creators utilize this when thinking about what demographic they are trying to sell their product to. Journalists use similar method of thinking when they are writing to try and include certain audiences. These forms of media are mass consumed by a wide variety of audiences. The information within them can change social perceptions or reinforcing those that are already existing.

== See also ==
- Ethnicity theory
- Color blind racism
- Racialization

== Bibliography ==
- Omi, Michael; Winant, Howard (1986), Racial Formation in the United States (1st ed.), New York: Routledge.
- ———; ——— (1994), Racial Formation in the United States (2nd ed.), New York: Routledge.
- ———; ——— (2015), Racial Formation in the United States (3rd ed.), New York: Routledge.
- Rothenberg, Paula S. (2006), Race, class, and gender in the United States: an integrated study, Worth Publishers, ISBN 978-0-7167-6148-8.
