= Minzu (anthropology) =

Chinese concept of community and culture

In China, the word minzu (Chinese: 民族; pinyin: mínzú) means a community that inherits culture (文化) or consanguinity (血缘). Depending on the context, the word has various meanings, such as "nation", "ethnicity", and "race". In modern Chinese languages, minzu has a stronger cultural meaning than racial meaning.

Minzu-based nationalism is associated with nationalism in Northeast Asia and Vietnam, usually in the form of cultural or ethnic nationalism, in contrast to state nationalism. Minzu-based nationalism in China and Taiwan is close to multi-ethnic nationalism.

== Etymology ==
In Chinese, the term minzu has several meanings; it can be confused with concepts such as zhǒngzú (种族, lit. 'race'), guózú (国族, lit. 'nation'), zúqún (族群, lit. 'ethnic group'). For example, mínzú zhǔyì (民族主义, lit. 'minzu-ism') means "nationalism", but mínzú xué (民族学, lit. 'minzu-study') means "ethnology".

The term "minzu" is found in the biography of Gao Yi (高逸) in Xiao Zixian's Book of Qi during the Liang dynasty ("今諸華士女民族弗革"), and in the book Taibai Yinjing ("愚人得之以傾宗社滅民族"). However, these terms are closer to the meaning of "people" (民众) than they are to today.

Minzu is a loanword from Japanese. During the Meji period, Japanese translators rendered "nation", "ethnic group", and "Volk" into minzoku (Japanese: 民族) when translating European books, which was introduced to China.

== Zhonghua minzu ==
Before the 1911 Revolution, the members of the Chinese Revolutionary Party were hostile to the Qing dynasty ("Anti-Qing sentiment") and tried to build a nation-state around the Han Chinese; at this time the concept of Zhonghua minzu (simplified Chinese: 中华民族; traditional Chinese: 中華民族; pinyin: zhōnghuá mínzú) was about the same meaning with Han minzu (汉民族; 漢民族; hàn mínzú) or Hanzu (simplified Chinese: 汉族; traditional Chinese: 漢族; pinyin: hànzú).

After the 1911 Revolution, the concept of "Five Races Under One Union" was introduced, and later Zhonghua minzu united various ethnic groups in China. Today, Zhonghua minzu is concept is related to multi-ethnic nationalism, and therefore distinct from Han minzu or Hanzu.

== National liberation movements ==
From the 1930s to 1945, the Japanese imperialists proclaimed the idea of "national liberation" (民族自決, minzoku jiketsu) and "national self-determination" (民族解放, minzoku kaihō) to encourage the separation of Northeast China and North China from the rest of the country. This is also related to local ethnic nationalism; minzu may mean "nation" but may also mean "ethnic group".

In Postwar Japan, liberal nationalists like Masao Maruyama emphasized "国民主義" (kokumin shugi, lit. "state-based nationalism" or "civic nationalism") while left-wing nationalists who supported Marxism and anti-imperialism emphasized "民族主義" (minzoku shugi, lit. 'ethnic nationalism').

Today, in South Korea, left-liberals tend to value minjok (the Korean race) over the North–South ideological and political divide. In a broader sense, left-liberals embrace "ethnic nationalism" (Korean: 민족주의; Hanja: 民族主義); the notion that sharing the same bloodline is superior to temporary national partition. Conservatives on the other hand support "regime-based nationalism" (국민주의; 國民主義 or 국가주의; 國家主義), which puts emphasis on being South Korean and stresses the differences in social and political values between the two Koreas.

Hong Kong nationalists reject the concept of "Chinese minzu" (中華民族) and define themselves as "HongKonger minzu" (香港民族). "Hong Kong [ethnic] nationalism" (民族主義 or 香港民族主義) is often opposed to Chinese state nationalism (國家主義 or 中國國家主義), because many Chinese state nationalists support reducing Hong Kong's autonomy. During Taiwan's KMT one-party dictatorship, the Kuomintang (KMT) defended Chinese state nationalism, in opposition to which liberal/progressives, including the Democratic Progressive Party (DPP), defended Taiwanese-based "liberal [ethnic] nationalism" (自由民族主義); moderate Taiwanese [ethnic] nationalism has an impact on Taiwanese politics even after democratization.

When modern Vietnamese nationalism was emerging during the French Indochina period, "nation" was defined as both dân tộc (民族) and quốc dân (國民). Dân tộc was commonly used in discourse, including among left-wing circles such as the Indochinese Communist Party and the Trotskyists. Quốc dân was also employed by nationalist groups, from centre-left to right-wing, such as Việt Nam Quốc Dân Đảng, Self-Reliant Literary Association, and Nationalist Party of Greater Vietnam, signifying the civic role and participation of the populace in nation-building. Since the Second World War, another term, quốc gia (國家), also gained popularity, as seen in names like Đại-Việt Quốc-gia Liên-minh, Việt-Nam Quốc-gia Độc-lập Đảng, and Mặt-trận Quốc-gia Liên-hiệp.

In the early years of the Democratic Republic of Vietnam (DRV), the term quốc dân was also used to appeal to a broader audience. Subsequently, the national communists (the DRV, the Viet Minh, and the Viet Cong) settled on the term dân tộc, while the anti-communist nationalists (the State of Vietnam and, later, the Republic of Vietnam) aligned themselves with the term quốc gia. The terms chủ nghĩa dân tộc and chủ nghĩa quốc gia thus came to represent two strands of Vietnamese nationalism. Additionally, in matters concerning ethnic minorities, North Vietnam adopted the same term dân tộc (民族), whereas South Vietnam preferred sắc tộc (色族) to denote ethnicity.

== Racial pride ==
Some Northeast Asia's nationalists value the 'blood purity' when defining minzu, showing racial nationalism. Yamato nationalism during Empire of Japan, and today's North Korea's Juche are linked to racial nationalism.

According to some scholars, Northeast Asia's "nationalism" (民族主義) has right Hegelians and 19th century notions of blood and soil.

== Three Principles of the People ==
"Mínzú" (民族, nationalism) is a core principle of the Three Principles of the People, along with "Mínquán" (民權, democracy) and "Mínshēng" (民生, socialism).

== See also ==
- Ethnonational group
- List of ethnic groups in China
- Minzu (disambiguation)
- Multinational state
- National mysticism
- People (人民)
- Romantic nationalism
- Separatism
- Tribe (部族)
- Volk
- Related Asia's nationalisms:
  - Chinese nationalism
    - Han nationalism, Local ethnic nationalism
  - Hong Kong nationalism
  - Korean nationalism (Korean ethnic nationalism)
  - Japanese nationalism (Yamato nationalism)
  - Taiwanese nationalism
  - Vietnamese nationalism
