= Nationalism in Japan =

Nationalism in Japan may refer to:

- Ethnic nationalism in Japan (日本の民族主義)
- Japanese nationalism (日本のナショナリズム)
  - Kokkashugi (国家主義)
