= Minzu =

Minzu may refer to:

- Minzu (民族), a Chinese term often translated as "ethnic group", "nation" and "race"
- Zhonghua minzu, a key political term in modern Chinese history
- Ethnic minorities in China (Chinese: shǎoshù mínzú)
  - See also: List of ethnic groups in China
- Minzu University of China
- Minzu railway station (Inner Mongolia), on the Beijing–Baotou railway
- Minzu railway station (Taiwan), on the Pingtung line in Kaohsiung
- Minzu Night Market, a night market in Pingtung City
- Minzu Township (民族乡) in Li County, Gansu, in China

== See also ==
- Volk#Outside of German
- Minjok (disambiguation)
