= Minjok =

Minjok (Korean: 민족; Hanja: 民族) may refer to:

- Korean nationalism
  - Minjok historiography, a hagiographic way of writing nationalistic Korean history
  - Minjok jeonggi, a Korean nationalist term similar to the "Volksgeist"
  - Uriminzokkiri, a website of North Korea
- Baedal Minjok, a South Korean food delivery company
- Korean Minjok Leadership Academy, a high school in Gangwon Province, South Korea

== See also ==
- Volk#Outside of German
- Ethnic nationalism in Japan ("Minzoku")
- Minzu (disambiguation)
