= Ainu Party =

Ainu Party アイヌ民族党 Ainu-Minzokutō
- Leader: Shirō Kayano
- Founded: 21 January 2012
- Ideology: Ainu nationalism; Multiculturalism; Sustainable development
- Colours: Red; Green; Blue
- Councillors: 0 / 242
- Representatives: 0 / 465
- Prefectural assembly members: 0 / 2,675
- City and town assembly members: 1 / 30,490

Website
- fmpipausi.sakura.ne.jp/aynu_party/

The Ainu Party (Japanese: アイヌ民族党, romanized: Ainu-Minzokutō, lit. 'Ethnic Ainu Party' or 'Ainu Nation Party') is a moderate 'nationalist' (民族主義, minzokushugi) regional political party active in Hokkaido. This is a regional party that defends the interests of the Ainu people. The Ainu Party advocates the interests of the Ainu people, and a "multicultural or multiracial symbiotic society" (Japanese: 多文化・多民族共生社会, romanized: Tabunka・Taminzoku Kyōsei Shakai).

The Ainu Party was formed by a political group from November 2011, and was founded in January 2012.

== Ideology and policy ==
Ideologies and policies officially stated by the party are as follows:

1. Restoration of rights of Ainu people and fulfillment of education.
2. Strengthening the Welfare of Ainu People.
3. Realization of Multicultural and Multiracial Symbiosis.
4. Realization of a (sustainable) society utilized in the cycle of nature.
5. implementation of administrative and fiscal reforms.

The party also insists on designating Ainu languages as the official language of Japan, and opposition to the Trans-Pacific Partnership.

== See also ==
- Democratic Party of Japan
- Ethnic nationalism in Japan
- Māori Party
