= Ethnicity =

Social group defined by shared traits

An ethnicity or ethnic group is a group of humans who identify with each other on the basis of perceived shared attributes that distinguish them from other groups. Attributes that ethnicities are believed to share include any of the following: language, culture, common sets of ancestry, traditions, society, religion, history, region, or social treatment. Ethnic identities may have a narrow or broad spectrum of genetic ancestry, with some groups having mixed genetic ancestry. Ethnicity is sometimes used interchangeably with nation. It is also sometimes used interchangeably with race, although not all ethnicities identify as racial groups.

By way of assimilation, acculturation, amalgamation, language shift, intermarriage, adoption and religious conversion, individuals or groups may over time shift from one ethnic group to another. Ethnic groups may be divided into subgroups or tribes, which over time may become separate ethnic groups themselves due to endogamy or physical isolation from the parent group. Conversely, formerly separate ethnicities can merge to form a panethnicity and may eventually merge into one single ethnicity. Whether through division or amalgamation, the formation of a separate ethnic identity is referred to as ethnogenesis.

Two theories exist in understanding ethnicities, mainly primordialism and constructivism. Early 20th-century primordialists viewed ethnic groups as real phenomena whose distinct characteristics have endured since the distant past. Perspectives that developed after the 1960s increasingly viewed ethnic groups as social constructs, with identity assigned by societal rules.

== Terminology ==
The term ethnic is ultimately derived from the Greek ethnos, through its adjectival form ethnikos, loaned into Latin as ethnicus. The inherited English language term for this concept is folk, used alongside the latinate people since the late Middle English period.

In Early Modern English and until the mid-19th century, ethnic was used to mean heathen or pagan (in the sense of disparate "nations" which did not yet participate in the Christian ecumene), as the Septuagint used ta ethne 'the nations' to translate the Hebrew goyim "the foreign nations, non-Hebrews, non-Jews". The Greek term in early antiquity (Homeric Greek) could refer to any large group, a host of men, a band of comrades as well as a swarm or flock of animals. In Classical Greek, the word took on a meaning comparable to the concept now expressed by "ethnic group", mostly translated as "nation, tribe, a unique people group"; only in Hellenistic Greek did the term tend to become further narrowed to refer to "foreign" or "barbarous" nations in particular (whence the later meaning "heathen, pagan").

In the 19th century the term came to be used in the sense of "peculiar to a tribe, race, people or nation", in a return to the original Greek meaning. The sense of "different cultural groups", and in American English "tribal, racial, cultural or national minority group" arises in the 1930s to 1940s, serving as a replacement of the term race which had earlier taken this sense but was now becoming deprecated due to its association with ideological racism. The abstract ethnicity had been used as a stand-in for "paganism" in the 18th century, but now came to express the meaning of an "ethnic character" (first recorded 1953).

The term ethnic group was first recorded in 1935 and entered the Oxford English Dictionary in 1972. Depending on context, the term nationality may be used either synonymously with ethnicity or synonymously with citizenship (in a sovereign state). The process that results in emergence of an ethnicity is called ethnogenesis, a term in use in ethnological literature since about 1950. The term may also be used with the connotation of something unique and unusually exotic (cf. "an ethnic restaurant", etc.), generally related to cultures of more recent immigrants, who arrived after the dominant population of an area was established.

Depending on which source of group identity is emphasized to define membership, the following types of (often mutually overlapping) groups can be identified:

- Ethno-linguistic, emphasizing shared language, dialect (and possibly script) – example: French Canadians
- Ethno-national, emphasizing a shared polity or sense of national identity – example: Austrians
- Ethno-racial, emphasizing shared physical appearance based on phenotype – example: African Americans
- Ethno-regional, emphasizing a distinct local sense of belonging stemming from relative geographic isolation – example: South Islanders of New Zealand
- Ethno-religious, emphasizing shared affiliation with a particular religion, denomination or sect – example: Mormons, Sikhs, Jews, Brahmins
- Ethno-civic, emphasizing a shared civic identity (i.e. political autonomy and territorial control), often overlapping with ethno-national – example: Ancient Romans
- Ethno-cultural, emphasizing shared culture or tradition, often overlapping with other forms of ethnicity – example: Travellers

In many cases, more than one aspect determines membership: for instance, Armenian ethnicity can be defined by Armenian citizenship, having Armenian heritage, native use of the Armenian language, or membership of the Armenian Apostolic Church.

== Definitions and conceptual history ==
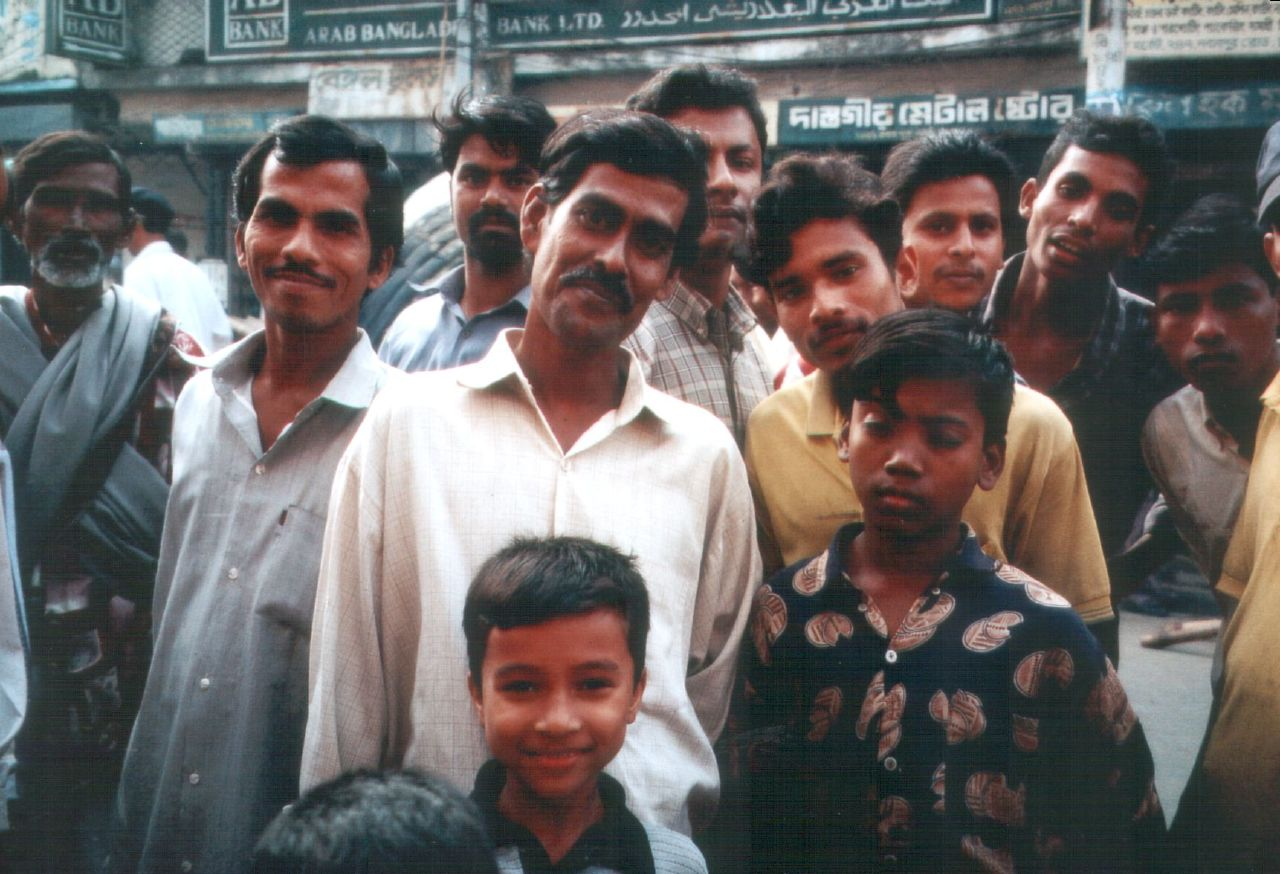
A group of ethnic Bengalis in Dhaka, Bangladesh. The Bengalis form the third-largest ethnic group in the world, with the largest being the Han Chinese and the second largest being the Arabs.

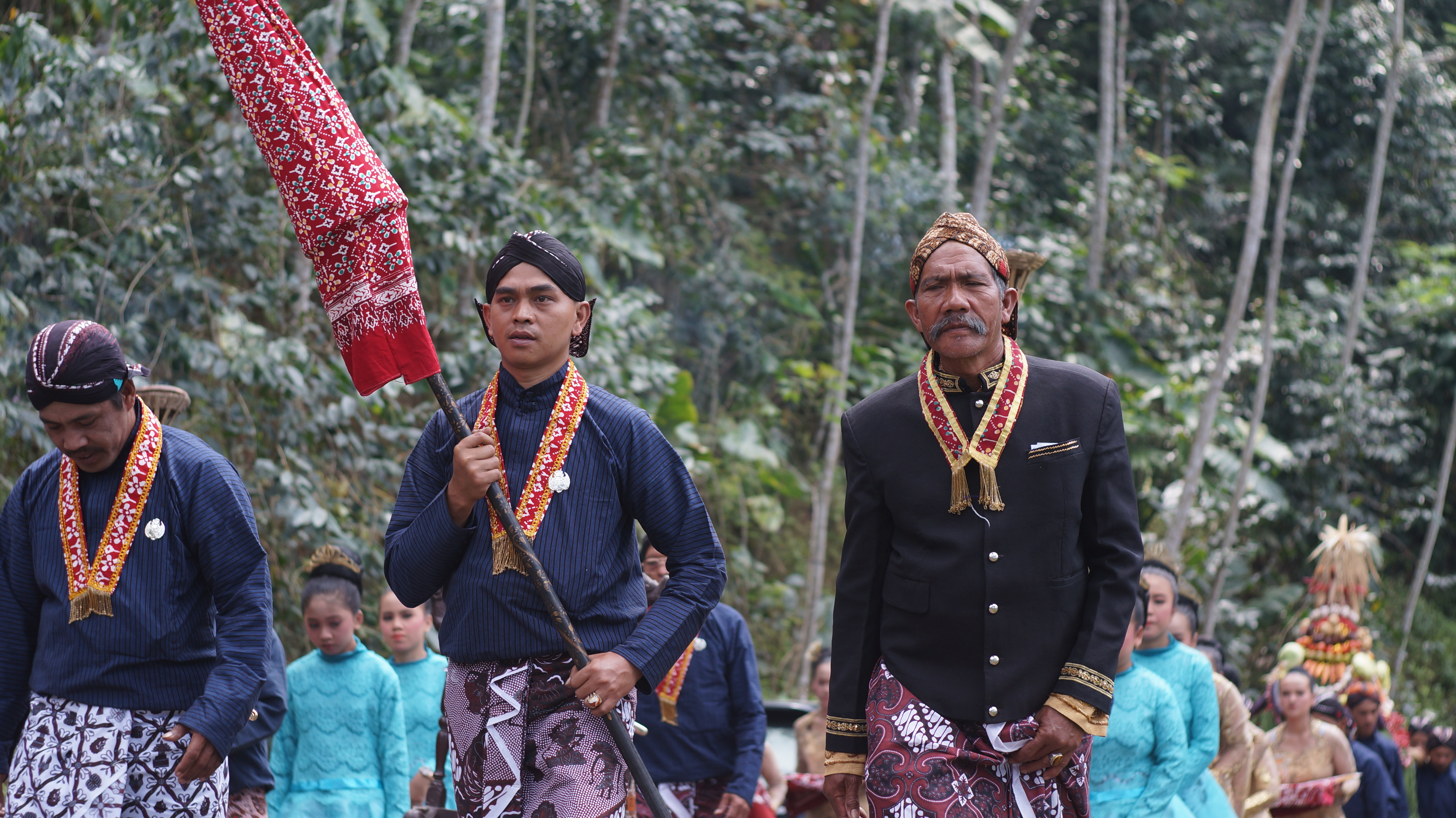
The Javanese people of Indonesia are the largest Austronesian ethnic group.

Ethnography begins in classical antiquity; after early authors like Anaximander and Hecataeus of Miletus, Herodotus laid the foundation of both historiography and ethnography of the ancient world c. 480 BC. The Greeks had developed a concept of their own ethnicity, which they grouped under the name of Hellenes. Although there were exceptions, such as Macedonia, which was ruled by nobility in a way that was not typically Greek, and Sparta, which had an unusual ruling class, the ancient Greeks generally enslaved only non-Greeks due to their strong belief in ethnic nationalism. The Greeks sometimes believed that even their lowest citizens were superior to any barbarian. In his Politics 1.2–7; 3.14, Aristotle even described barbarians as natural slaves in contrast to the Greeks. Herodotus (8.144.2) gave a famous account of what defined Greek (Hellenic) ethnic identity in his day, enumerating

1. shared descent (Greek: ὅμαιμον – homaimon, "of the same blood"),
2. shared language (Greek: ὁμόγλωσσον – homoglōsson, "speaking the same language"),
3. shared sanctuaries and sacrifices (Greek: θεῶν ἱδρύματά τε κοινὰ καὶ θυσίαι – theōn hidrumata te koina kai thusiai),
4. shared customs (Greek: ἤθεα ὁμότροπα – ēthea homotropa, "customs of like fashion").

However, earlier Greek individuals did not define the Greek ethnicity by blood. According to Isocrates in his speech Panegyricus: "And so far has our city distanced the rest of mankind in thought and in speech that her pupils have become the teachers of the rest of the world; and she has brought it about that the name Hellenes suggests no longer a race but an intelligence, and that the title Hellenes is applied rather to those who share our culture than to those who share a common blood".

Whether ethnicity qualifies as a cultural universal is to some extent dependent on the exact definition used. Many social scientists, such as anthropologists Fredrik Barth and Eric Wolf, do not consider ethnic identity to be universal. They regard ethnicity as a product of specific kinds of inter-group interactions, rather than an essential quality inherent to human groups.

According to Thomas Hylland Eriksen, the study of ethnicity was dominated by two distinct debates until recently.

- One is between "primordialism" and "instrumentalism". In the primordialist view, the participant perceives ethnic ties collectively, as an externally given, even coercive, social bond. The instrumentalist approach, on the other hand, treats ethnicity primarily as an ad hoc element of a political strategy, used as a resource for interest groups for achieving secondary goals such as, for instance, an increase in wealth, power, or status. This debate is still an important point of reference in political science, although most scholars' approaches fall between the two poles.
- The second debate is between "constructivism" and "essentialism". Constructivists view national and ethnic identities as the product of historical forces, often recent, even when the identities are presented as old. Essentialists view such identities as ontological categories defining social actors.

According to Eriksen, these debates have been superseded, especially in anthropology, by scholars' attempts to respond to increasingly politicized forms of self-representation by members of different ethnic groups and nations. This is in the context of debates over multiculturalism in countries, such as the United States and Canada, which have large immigrant populations from many different cultures, and post-colonialism in the Caribbean and South Asia.

Max Weber maintained that ethnic groups were künstlich (artificial, i.e. a social construct) because they were based on a subjective belief in shared Gemeinschaft (community). Secondly, this belief in shared Gemeinschaft did not create the group; the group created the belief. Third, group formation resulted from the drive to monopolize power and status. This was contrary to the prevailing naturalist belief of the time, which held that socio-cultural and behavioral differences between peoples stemmed from inherited traits and tendencies derived from common descent, then called "race".

Another influential theoretician of ethnicity was Barth, whose "Ethnic Groups and Boundaries" from 1969 has been described as instrumental in spreading the usage of the term in social studies in the 1980s and 1990s. Barth went further than Weber in stressing the constructed nature of ethnicity. To Barth, ethnicity was perpetually negotiated and renegotiated by both external ascription and internal self-identification. Barth's view is that ethnic groups are not discontinuous cultural isolates or logical a priori to which people naturally belong. He wanted to part with anthropological notions of cultures as bounded entities, and ethnicity as primordialist bonds, replacing it with a focus on the interface between groups. "Ethnic Groups and Boundaries", therefore, is a focus on the interconnectedness of ethnic identities. Barth writes: "... categorical ethnic distinctions do not depend on an absence of mobility, contact, and information, but do entail social processes of exclusion and incorporation whereby discrete categories are maintained despite changing participation and membership in the course of individual life histories."

In 1978 the anthropologist Ronald Cohen claimed that the identification of "ethnic groups" in the usage of social scientists often reflected inaccurate labels more than indigenous realities:

... the named ethnic identities we accept, often unthinkingly, as basic givens in the literature are often arbitrarily, or even worse inaccurately, imposed.

In this way, he pointed to the fact that identification of an ethnic group by outsiders, e.g. anthropologists, may not coincide with the self-identification of the members of that group. He also described that in the first decades of usage, the term ethnicity had often been used in lieu of older terms such as "cultural" or "tribal" when referring to smaller groups with shared cultural systems and shared heritage, but that "ethnicity" had the added value of being able to describe the commonalities between systems of group identity in both tribal and modern societies. Cohen also suggested that claims concerning "ethnic" identity (like earlier claims concerning "tribal" identity) are often colonialist practices and effects of the relations between colonized peoples and nation-states.

According to Paul James, formations of identity were often changed and distorted by colonization, but identities are not made out of nothing:

Categorizations about identity, even when codified and hardened into clear typologies by processes of colonization, state formation or general modernizing processes, are always full of tensions and contradictions. Sometimes these contradictions are destructive, but they can also be creative and positive.

Social scientists have thus focused on how, when, and why different markers of ethnic identity become salient. Thus, anthropologist Joan Vincent observed that ethnic boundaries often have a mercurial character. Ronald Cohen concluded that ethnicity is "a series of nesting dichotomizations of inclusiveness and exclusiveness". He agrees with Joan Vincent's observation that (in Cohen's paraphrase) "Ethnicity ... can be narrowed or broadened in boundary terms in relation to the specific needs of political mobilization." This may be why descent is sometimes a marker of ethnicity, and sometimes not: which diacritic of ethnicity is salient depends on whether people are scaling ethnic boundaries up or down, and whether they are scaling them up or down depends generally on the political situation.

Kanchan Chandra rejects the expansive definitions of ethnic identity (such as those that include common culture, common language, common history and common territory), choosing instead to define ethnic identity narrowly as a subset of identity categories determined by the belief of common descent. Jóhanna Birnir similarly defines ethnicity as "group self-identification around a characteristic that is very difficult or even impossible to change, such as language, race, or location."

=== Approaches to understanding ethnicity ===
Different approaches to understanding ethnicity have been used by different social scientists when trying to understand the nature of ethnicity as a factor in human life and society. As Jonathan M. Hall observes, World War II was a turning point in ethnic studies. The consequences of Nazi racism discouraged essentialist interpretations of ethnic groups and race. Ethnic groups came to be defined as social rather than biological entities. Their coherence was attributed to shared myths, descent, kinship, a common place of origin, language, religion, customs and national character. So, ethnic groups are conceived as mutable rather than stable, constructed in discursive practices rather than written in the genes.

Examples of various approaches are primordialism, essentialism, perennialism, constructivism, modernism and instrumentalism.

- Primordialism holds that ethnicity has existed at all times of human history and that modern ethnic groups have historical continuity into the far past. For them, the idea of ethnicity is closely linked to the idea of nations and is rooted in the pre-Weber understanding of humanity as being divided into primordially existing groups rooted by kinship and biological heritage.
  - Essentialist primordialism further holds that ethnicity is an a priori fact of human existence, that ethnicity precedes any human social interaction and that it is unchanged by it. This theory sees ethnic groups as natural, not just as historical. However, this theory ignores the impact of intermarriage, migration and colonization, which shape the composition of modern-day multi-ethnic societies.
  - Kinship primordialism holds that ethnic communities are extensions of kinship units, basically being derived by kinship or clan ties where the choices of cultural signs (language, religion, traditions) are made exactly to show this biological affinity. In this way, the myths of common biological ancestry that are a defining feature of ethnic communities are to be understood as representing actual biological history. A problem with this view on ethnicity is that it is more often than not the case that mythic origins of specific ethnic groups directly contradict the known biological history of an ethnic community.
  - Geertz's primordialism, notably espoused by the anthropologist Clifford Geertz, argues that humans in general attribute an overwhelming power to primordial human "givens" such as blood ties, language, territory, and cultural differences. In Geertz' opinion, ethnicity is not in itself primordial but humans perceive it as such because it is embedded in their experience of the world.
- Perennialism is an approach that is primarily concerned with nationhood but tends to see nations and ethnic communities as basically the same phenomenon. It holds that the nation, as a type of social and political organization, is of an immemorial or "perennial" character. Smith (1999) distinguishes two variants: "continuous perennialism", which claims that particular nations have existed for very long periods, and "recurrent perennialism", which focuses on the emergence, dissolution and reappearance of nations as a recurring aspect of human history.
  - Perpetual perennialism holds that specific ethnic groups have existed continuously throughout history.
  - Situational perennialism holds that nations and ethnic groups emerge, change and vanish through the course of history. This view holds that the concept of ethnicity is a tool used by political groups to manipulate resources such as wealth, power, territory or status in their particular groups' interests. Accordingly, ethnicity emerges when it is relevant as a means of furthering emergent collective interests and changes according to political changes in society. Examples of a perennialist interpretation of ethnicity are also found in Barth and Seidner who see ethnicity as ever-changing boundaries between groups of people established through ongoing social negotiation and interaction.
  - Instrumentalist perennialism, while seeing ethnicity primarily as a versatile tool that identified different ethnic groups and limits through time, explains ethnicity as a mechanism of social stratification, meaning that ethnicity is the basis for a hierarchical arrangement of individuals. According to Donald Noel, a sociologist who developed a theory on the origin of ethnic stratification, ethnic stratification is a "system of stratification wherein some relatively fixed group membership (e.g., race, religion, or nationality) is used as a major criterion for assigning social positions". Ethnic stratification is one of many different types of social stratification, including stratification based on socio-economic status, race, or gender. According to Donald Noel, ethnic stratification will emerge only when specific ethnic groups are brought into contact with one another, and only when those groups are characterized by a high degree of ethnocentrism, competition, and differential power. Ethnocentrism is the tendency to look at the world primarily from the perspective of one's own culture, and to downgrade all other groups outside one's own culture. Some sociologists, such as Lawrence Bobo and Vincent Hutchings, say the origin of ethnic stratification lies in individual dispositions of ethnic prejudice, which relates to the theory of ethnocentrism. Continuing with Noel's theory, some degree of differential power must be present for the emergence of ethnic stratification. In other words, an inequality of power among ethnic groups means "they are of such unequal power that one is able to impose its will upon another". In addition to differential power, a degree of competition structured along ethnic lines is a prerequisite to ethnic stratification as well. The different ethnic groups must be competing for some common goal, such as power or influence, or a material interest, such as wealth or territory. Lawrence Bobo and Vincent Hutchings propose that competition is driven by self-interest and hostility, and results in inevitable stratification and conflict.
- Constructivism sees both primordialist and perennialist views as basically flawed, and rejects the notion of ethnicity as a basic human condition. It holds that ethnic groups are only products of human social interaction, maintained only in so far as they are maintained as valid social constructs in societies.
  - Modernist constructivism correlates the emergence of ethnicity with the movement towards nation states beginning in the early modern period. Proponents of this theory, such as Eric Hobsbawm, argue that ethnicity and notions of ethnic pride, such as nationalism, are purely modern inventions, appearing only in the modern period of world history. They hold that prior to this ethnic homogeneity was not considered an ideal or necessary factor in the forging of large-scale societies.

Ethnicity is an important means by which people may identify with a larger group. Many social scientists, such as the anthropologists Fredrik Barth and Eric Wolf, do not consider ethnic identity to be universal. They regard ethnicity as a product of specific kinds of inter-group interactions, rather than an essential quality inherent to human groups. The process that results in emergence of such identification is called ethnogenesis. Members of an ethnic group, on the whole, claim cultural continuities over time, although historians and cultural anthropologists have documented that many of the values, practices, and norms that imply continuity with the past are of relatively recent invention.

Ethnic groups can form a cultural mosaic in a society. That could be in a city like New York City or Trieste, but also the fallen monarchy of the Austro-Hungarian Empire or the United States. Current topics are in particular social and cultural differentiation, multilingualism, competing identity offers, multiple cultural identities and the formation of Salad bowl and melting pot. Ethnic groups differ from other social groups, such as subcultures, interest groups or social classes, because they emerge and change over historical periods (centuries) in a process known as ethnogenesis, a period of several generations of endogamy resulting in common ancestry (which is then sometimes cast in terms of a mythological narrative of a founding figure); ethnic identity is reinforced by reference to "boundary markers" – characteristics said to be unique to the group which set it apart from other groups.

=== Ethnicity theory in the United States ===
Ethnicity theory argues that race is a social category and is only one of several factors in determining ethnicity. Other criteria include "religion, language, 'customs', nationality, and political identification". This theory was put forward by the sociologist Robert E. Park in the 1920s. It is based on the notion of "culture".

This theory was preceded by more than 100 years during which biological essentialism was the dominant paradigm on race. Biological essentialism is the belief that some races, specifically White Europeans in western versions of the paradigm, are biologically superior and other races, specifically non-White races in western debates, are inherently inferior. This view arose as a way to justify enslavement of African Americans and genocide of Native Americans in a society that was officially founded on freedom for all. This was a notion that developed slowly and came to be a preoccupation with scientists, theologians, and the public. Religious institutions asked questions about whether there had been multiple creations of races (polygenesis) and whether God had created lesser races. Many of the foremost scientists of the time took up the idea of racial difference and found that White Europeans were superior.

The ethnicity theory was based on the assimilation model. Park outlined four steps to assimilation: contact, conflict, accommodation, and assimilation. Instead of attributing the marginalized status of people of colour in the United States to their inherent biological inferiority, he attributed it to their failure to assimilate into American culture. They could become equal if they abandoned their inferior cultures.

Michael Omi's and Howard Winant's theory of racial formation directly confronts both the premises and the practices of ethnicity theory. They argue in Racial Formation in the United States that the ethnicity theory was exclusively based on the immigration patterns of the White population and did take into account the unique experiences of non-Whites in the United States. While Park's theory identified different stages in the immigration process – contact, conflict, struggle, and as the last and best response, assimilation – it did so only for White communities. The ethnicity paradigm neglected the ways in which race can complicate a community's interactions with social and political structures, especially upon contact.

Assimilation – shedding the particular qualities of a native culture for the purpose of blending in with a host culture – did not work for some groups as a response to racism and discrimination, though it did for others. Once the legal barriers to achieving equality had been dismantled, the problem of racism became the sole responsibility of already disadvantaged communities. It was assumed that if a Black or Latino community was not "making it" by the standards that had been set by Whites, it was because that community did not hold the right values or beliefs, or were stubbornly resisting dominant norms because they did not want to fit in. Omi and Winant's critique of ethnicity theory explains how looking to cultural defect as the source of inequality ignores the "concrete sociopolitical dynamics within which racial phenomena operate in the U.S." It prevents critical examination of the structural components of racism and encourages a "benign neglect" of social inequality.

== Ethnicity and nationality ==
In some cases, especially those involving transnational migration or colonial expansion, people may link ethnicity to nationality. Anthropologists and historians, following the modernist understanding of ethnicity as proposed by Ernest Gellner and by Benedict Anderson see nations and nationalism as developing with the rise of the modern state-system in the 17th century. This process culminated in the rise of nation-states in which the presumptive boundaries of the nation coincided (or ideally coincided) with state boundaries. Thus, in the Western world, the notion of ethnicity, like race and nation, developed in the context of European colonial expansion, when mercantilism and capitalism were promoting global movements of populations at the same time that state boundaries were being more clearly and rigidly defined.

In the 19th century modern states generally sought legitimacy through their claim to represent "nations". Nation states, however, invariably include populations who have been excluded from national life for one reason or another. Members of excluded groups, consequently, will either demand inclusion based on equality, or they will seek autonomy, sometimes even to the extent of complete political separation from their existing nation-state. Under these conditions, when people moved from one state to another, or when one state conquered or colonized peoples beyond its national boundaries, ethnic groups were formed by people who identified with one nation but lived in another state.

Multi-ethnic states can result from one of two opposite events:

- either the recent creation of state borders at variance with traditional tribal territories
- or the recent immigration of ethnic minorities into a formerly homogenous nation-state

Examples for the first case occur throughout Africa, where countries formed during decolonization inherited arbitrary colonial borders, but also in European countries such as Belgium or the United Kingdom. Examples for the second case are countries such as Netherlands, which were relatively ethnically homogeneous when they attained statehood but have received significant immigration in the 17th century and even more so in the second half of the 20th century. States such as the United Kingdom, France and Switzerland comprised distinct ethnic groups from their formation and have likewise experienced substantial immigration, resulting in what have been termed "multicultural" societies, especially in large cities.

The states of the New World were multi-ethnic from the onset, as they developed as settler colonies imposed on existing indigenous populations.

In recent decades, feminist scholars (most notably Nira Yuval-Davis) have drawn attention to the fundamental ways in which women participate in the creation and reproduction of ethnic and national categories. Though these categories are usually discussed as belonging to the public, political sphere, they are upheld within the private, family sphere to a great extent. It is here that women act not just as biological reproducers but also as "cultural carriers", transmitting knowledge and enforcing behaviors that belong to a specific collectivity. Women also often play a significant symbolic role in conceptions of nation or ethnicity, for example in the notion that "women and children" constitute the kernel of a nation which must be defended in times of conflict, or in iconic figures such as Britannia or Marianne.

== Ethnicity and race ==
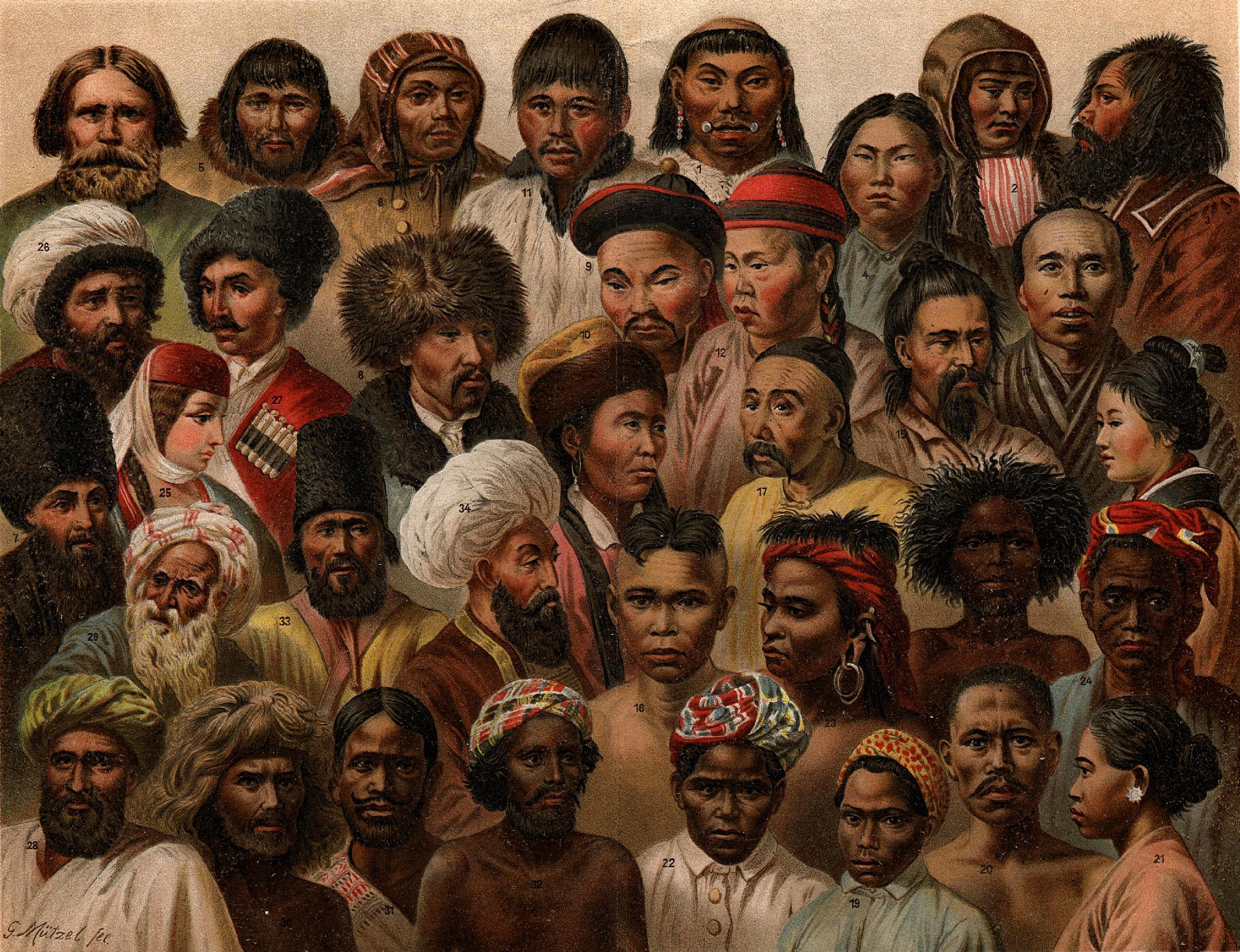
The racial diversity of Asia's ethnic groups (original caption: Asiatiska folk), Nordisk familjebok (1904)

Before Weber (1864–1920), race and ethnicity were primarily seen as two aspects of the same thing. Before 1900, the primordialist understanding of ethnicity predominated with cultural differences seen as being the result of inherited traits and tendencies. With Weber's introduction of the idea of ethnicity as a social construct, race and ethnicity became more divided from each other.

In 1950 the UNESCO statement "The Race Question", signed by some of the internationally renowned scholars of the time (including Ashley Montagu, Claude Lévi-Strauss, Gunnar Myrdal, Julian Huxley, etc.), said:

National, religious, geographic, linguistic and cultural groups do not necessarily coincide with racial groups: and the cultural traits of such groups have no demonstrated genetic connection with racial traits. Because serious errors of this kind are habitually committed when the term "race" is used in popular parlance, it would be better when speaking of human races to drop the term "race" altogether and speak of "ethnic groups".

In 1982 the anthropologist David Craig Griffith summarized forty years of ethnographic research, arguing that racial and ethnic categories are symbolic markers for different ways people from different parts of the world have been incorporated into a global economy:

The opposing interests that divide the working classes are further reinforced through appeals to "racial" and "ethnic" distinctions. Such appeals serve to allocate different categories of workers to rungs on the scale of labor markets, relegating stigmatized populations to the lower levels and insulating the higher echelons from competition from below. Capitalism did not create all the distinctions of ethnicity and race that function to set off categories of workers from one another. It is, nevertheless, the process of labor mobilization under capitalism that imparts to these distinctions their effective values.

According to Wolf, racial categories were constructed and incorporated during the period of European mercantile expansion, and ethnic groupings during the period of capitalist expansion.

Writing in 1977 about the usage of the term "ethnic" in the ordinary language of the United Kingdom and the United States, Wallman noted

The term "ethnic" popularly connotes "[race]" in Britain, only less precisely, and with a lighter value load. In North America, by contrast, "[race]" most commonly means color, and "ethnics" are the descendants of relatively recent immigrants from non-English-speaking countries. "[Ethnic]" is not a noun in Britain. In effect there are no "ethnics"; there are only "ethnic relations".

In the US, the Office of Management and Budget says the definition of race as used for the purposes of the US Census is not "scientific or anthropological" and takes into account "social and cultural characteristics as well as ancestry", using "appropriate scientific methodologies" that are not "primarily biological or genetic in reference".

Ramón Grosfoguel (University of California, Berkeley) argues that "racial/ethnic identity" is one concept and concepts of race and ethnicity cannot be used as separate and autonomous categories.

== Ethno-national conflict ==
Sometimes ethnic groups are subject to prejudicial attitudes and actions by the state or its constituents. In the 20th century, scholars began to argue that conflicts among ethnic groups, or between members of an ethnic group and the state, can and should be resolved in one of two ways. Some, like Jürgen Habermas and Bruce Barry, argue the legitimacy of modern states must be based on a notion of political rights of autonomous individual subjects. According to this view, the state should not acknowledge ethnic, national or racial identity but rather enforce political and legal equality. Others, like Charles Taylor and Will Kymlicka, argue that the notion of the autonomous individual is a cultural construct. According to this view, states must recognise ethnic identity and develop processes through which the particular needs of ethnic groups can be accommodated within the boundaries of the nation-state.

The 19th century saw the development of the political ideology of ethnic nationalism, when the concept of race was tied to nationalism, first by German theorists including Johann Gottfried Herder. Instances of societies focusing on ethnic ties, arguably to the exclusion of history or historical context, have resulted in the justification of nationalist goals. Periods frequently cited as examples of this are the 19th-century consolidation and expansion of the German Empire, and 20th-century Nazi Germany. Each promoted the pan-ethnic idea that these governments were acquiring only lands that had always been inhabited by ethnic Germans. The history of latecomers to the nation-state model, such as those arising in the Near East and south-east Europe out of the dissolution of the Ottoman and Austro-Hungarian Empires, as well as those arising out of the Soviet Union, is marked by inter-ethnic conflicts. Such conflicts usually occur within multi-ethnic states, as opposed to between them, as in other regions of the world. Thus, the conflicts are often misleadingly labelled and characterised as civil wars when they are inter-ethnic conflicts in a multi-ethnic state.

== Ethnic groups by continent ==
=== Africa ===
Africa is the most ethnically and linguistically diverse continent, with over 3,000 ethnic groups and more than 2,000 languages spoken across 54 countries. These languages belong to major families such as Niger-Congo, Afroasiatic, Nilo-Saharan, and Khoisan, and most ethnic groups maintain distinct cultural traditions.

=== Asia ===
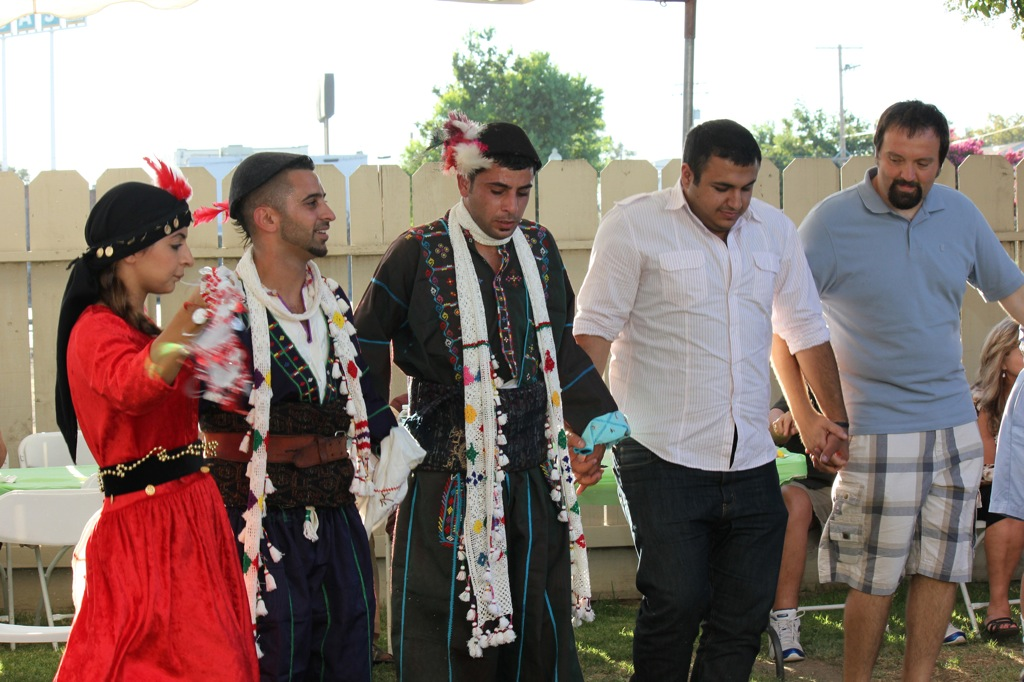
Assyrians are one of the indigenous peoples of Northern Iraq.

Ethnic groups are abundant throughout Asia, with adaptations to the climate zones of Asia, which can be the Arctic, subarctic, temperate, subtropical or tropical. The ethnic groups have adapted to mountains, deserts, grasslands, and forests.

On the coasts of Asia, the ethnic groups have adopted various methods of harvest and transport. Some groups are primarily hunter-gatherers, some practice transhumance (nomadic lifestyle), others have been agrarian/rural for millennia and others becoming industrial/urban. Some groups/countries of Asia are completely urban, such as those in Hong Kong, Shanghai and Singapore. The colonization of much of Asia largely ended in the 20th century, driven by national movements for independence and self-determination across the continent, such as those inspired by the Indian independence movement.

In India alone, there are more than 2,000 distinct ethnic groups, whilst in Indonesia alone, there are more than 600 ethnic groups, which are located on 17,000 islands in the Indonesian archipelago.

Russia has more than 185 recognized ethnic groups besides the 80% ethnic Russian majority. The largest group is the Tatars, 3.8%. Many of the smaller groups are found in the Asian part of Russia (see Indigenous peoples of Siberia).

=== Europe ===
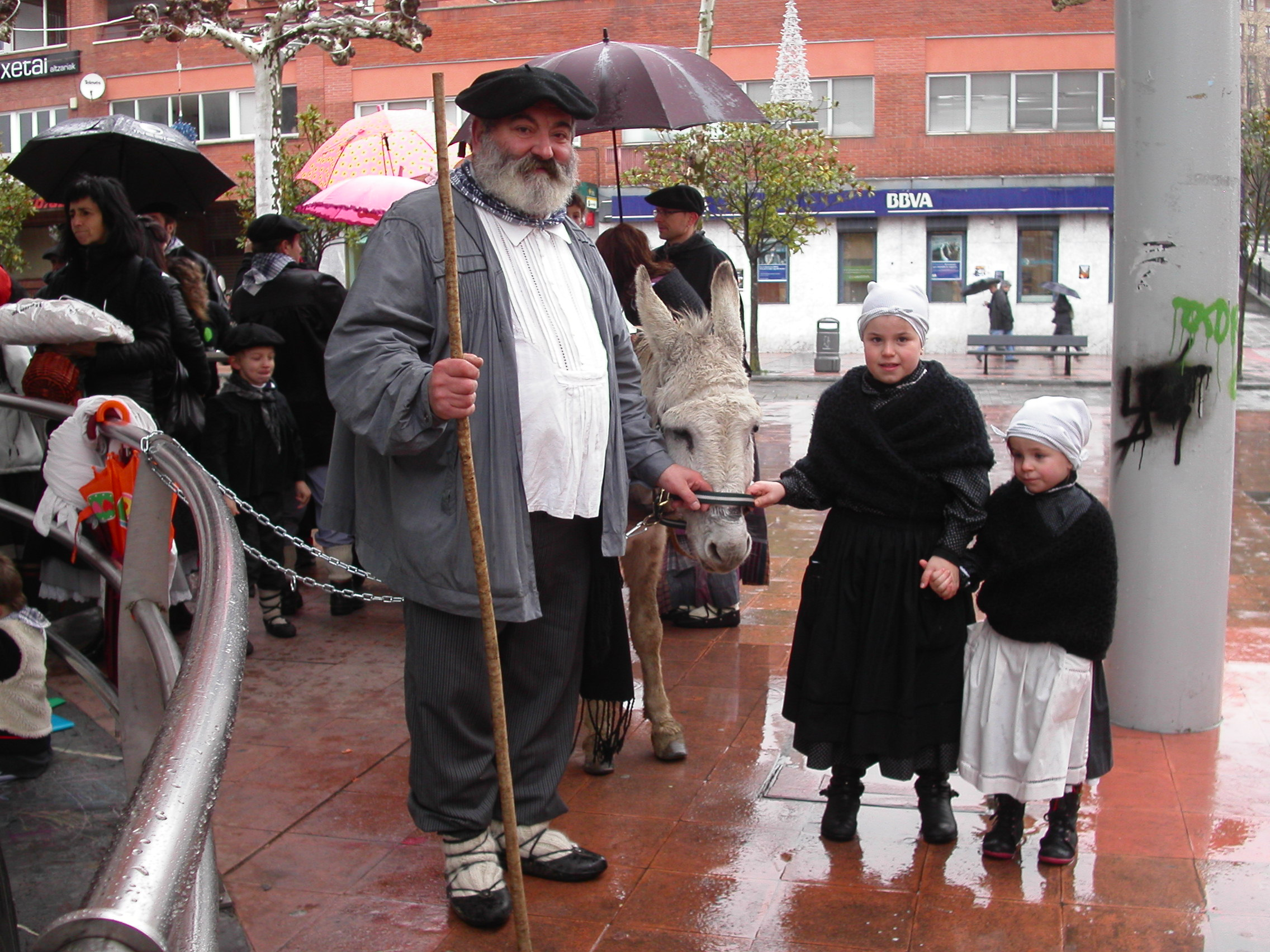
The Basques constitute an indigenous ethnic minority in both France and Spain.

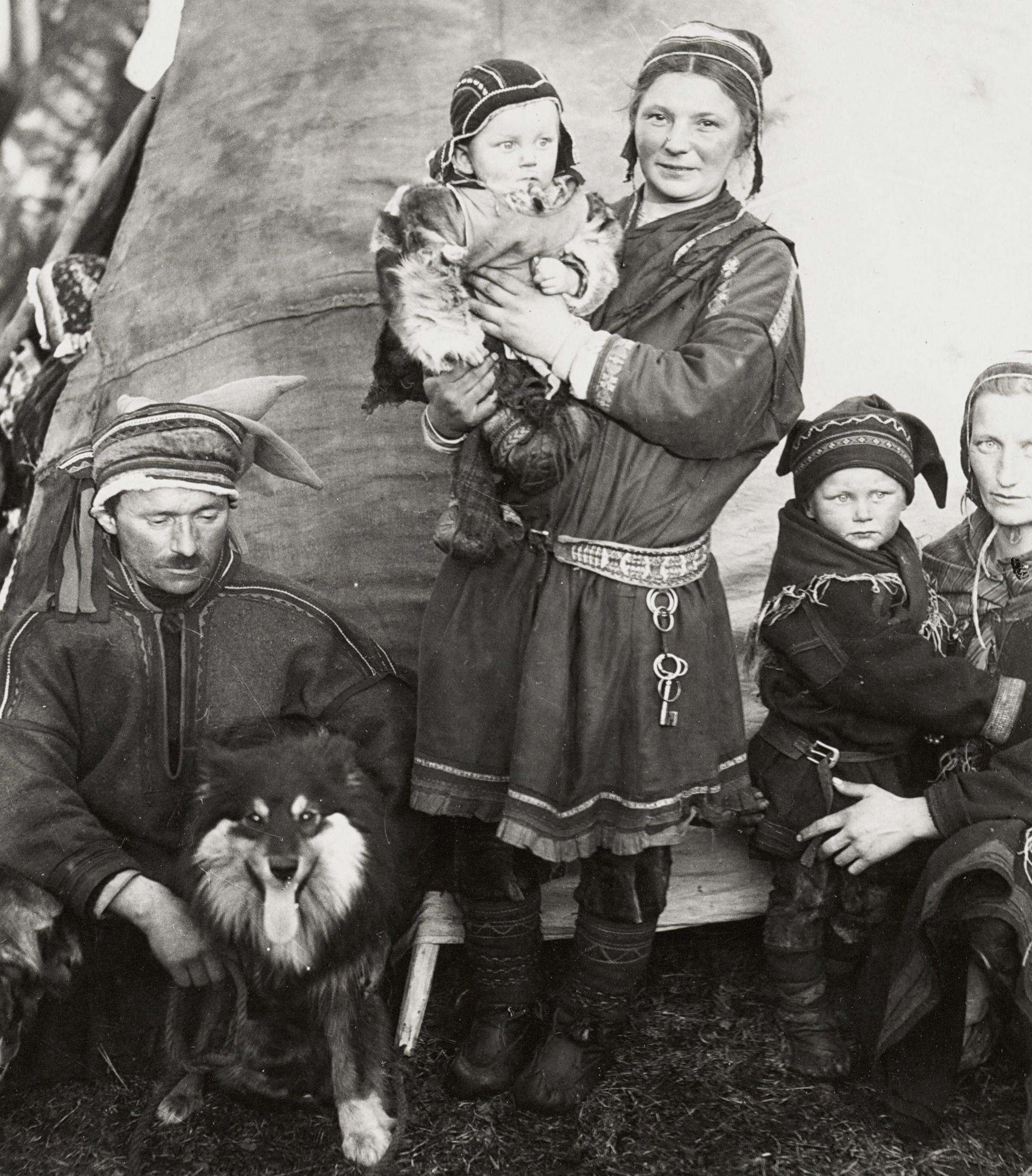
Sámi family in Lapland of Finland, 1936

Europe has a large number of ethnic groups; Pan and Pfeil (2004) count 87 distinct "peoples of Europe", of which 33 form the majority population in at least one sovereign state, while the remaining 54 constitute ethnic minorities within every state they inhabit (although they may form local regional majorities within a sub-national entity). The total number of national minority populations in Europe is estimated at 105 million people or 14% of 770 million Europeans.

A number of European countries, including France and Switzerland, do not collect information on the ethnicity of their resident population.

An example of a largely nomadic ethnic group in Europe is the Roma, also known (often pejoratively) as Gypsies. They originated from India and speak the Romani language.

The Serbian province of Vojvodina is recognizable for its multiethnic and multicultural identity. There are some 26 ethnic groups in it, and six languages are in official use by the provincial administration.

=== North America ===
The indigenous people in North America are Native Americans. The largest pan-ethnic group in the United States is White Americans. Hispanic and Latino Americans (Mexican Americans in particular) and Asian Americans have immigrated to the United States recently. In Mexico most Mexicans are mestizo, a mixture of Spanish and Native American ancestry. Some Hispanic and Latino Americans living in the United States are not mestizos.

Enslaved Africans were brought to North America from the 16th to 19th centuries during the Atlantic slave trade. Many of them were sent to the Caribbean. Ethnic groups that live in the Caribbean are: indigenous peoples, Africans, Indians, White Europeans, Chinese and Portuguese. The first White Europeans to arrive in the Dominican Republic were the Spanish in 1492. The Caribbean was also colonized and discovered by the Portuguese, English, Dutch and French.

A sizeable number of people in the United States have mixed-race identities. In 2021, the number of Americans who identified as non-Hispanic and more than one race was 13.5 million. The number of Hispanic Americans who identified as multiracial was 20.3 million. Over the course of the 2010s decade, there was a 127% increase in non-Hispanic Americans who identified as multiracial.

The largest ethnic groups in the United States are Germans, African Americans, Mexicans, Irish, English, Americans, Italians, Poles, French, Scottish, Native Americans, Puerto Ricans, Norwegians, Dutch people, Swedish people, Chinese people, West Indians, Russians and Filipinos.

In Canada European Canadians are the largest ethnic group. The indigenous population is growing faster than the non-indigenous population. Most immigrants in Canada come from Asia.

=== South America ===
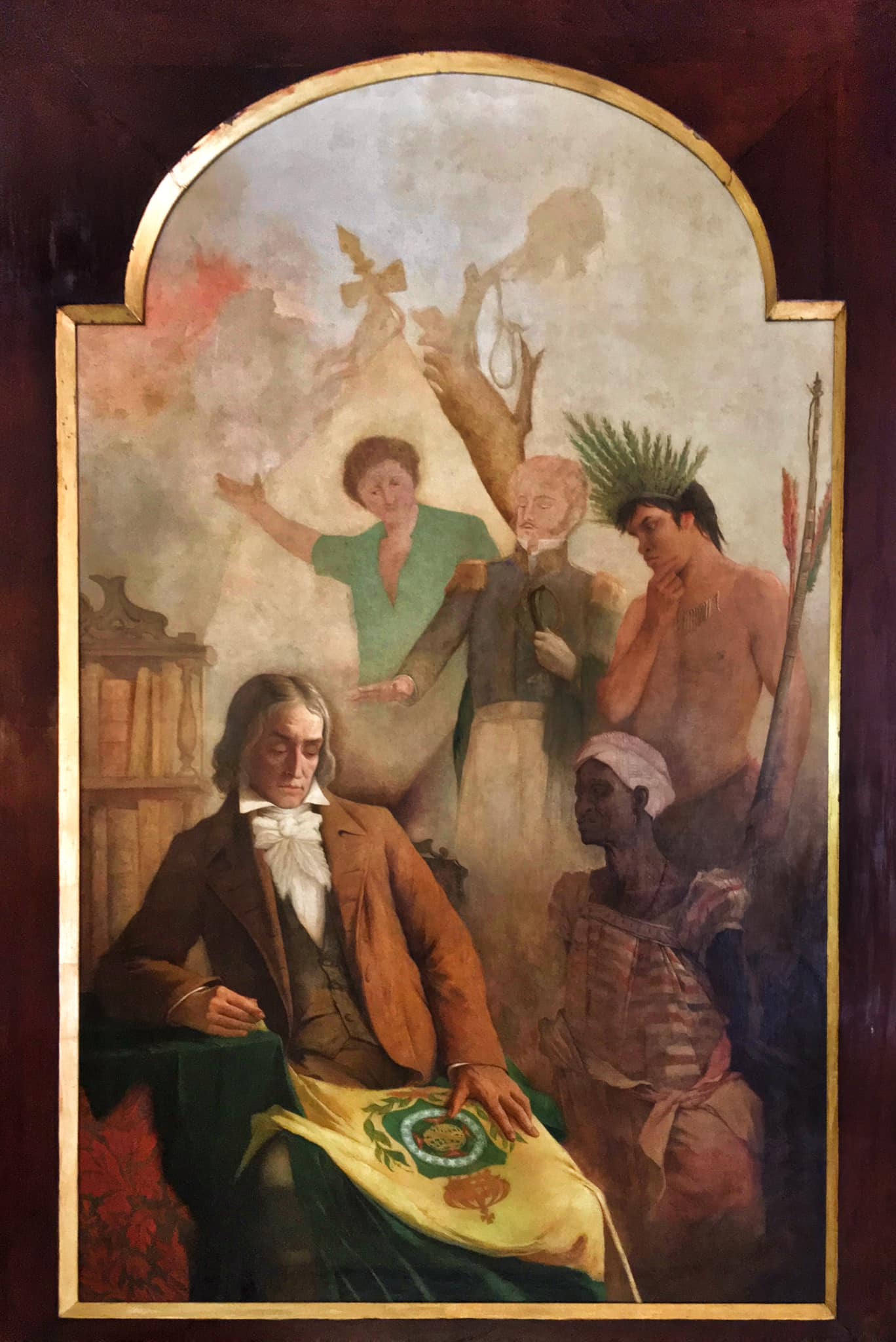
The Founding of the Brazilian Fatherland, an 1899 allegorical painting depicting the Brazilian statesman José Bonifácio de Andrada e Silva, one of the country's founding fathers, with the flag of the Empire of Brazil across his lap and representatives of Brazil's three major ethnic groups

In South America, although highly varying between regions, populations are commonly of mixed-race (mestizo), indigenous, European, African, and to a lesser extent Asian ancestry.

=== Oceania ===
Nearly all states in Oceania have majority indigenous populations, with notable exceptions being Australia, New Zealand and Norfolk Island, who have majority European populations. States with smaller European populations include Guam, Hawaii and New Caledonia (whose Europeans are known as Caldoche). Indigenous peoples of Oceania are Australian Aboriginals, Austronesians and Papuans, and they originated from Asia. The Austronesians of Oceania are further broken up into three distinct groups; Melanesians, Micronesians and Polynesians.

Oceanic South Pacific islands nearing Latin America were uninhabited when discovered by Europeans in the 16th century, with nothing to indicate prehistoric human activity by Indigenous peoples of the Americas or Oceania. Contemporary residents are mainly mestizos and Europeans from the Latin American countries whom administer them, although none of these islands have extensive populations. Easter Island are the only oceanic island politically associated with Latin America to have an indigenous population, the Polynesian Rapa Nui people. Their current inhabitants include indigenous Polynesians and mestizo settlers from political administrators Chile, in addition to mixed-race individuals with Polynesian and mestizo/European ancestry. The British overseas territory of Pitcairn Islands, to the west of Easter Island, have a population of approximately 50 people. They are mixed-race Euronesians who descended from an initial group of British and Tahitian settlers in the 18th century. The islands were previously inhabited by Polynesians; they had long abandoned Pitcairn by the time the settlers had arrived. Norfolk Island, now an external territory of Australia, is also believed to have been inhabited by Polynesians prior to its initial European discovery in the 18th century. Some of their residents are descended from mixed-race Pitcairn Islanders that were relocated onto Norfolk due to overpopulation in 1856.

The once uninhabited Bonin Islands, later politically integrated into Japan, have a small population consisting of Japanese mainlanders and descendants of early European settlers. Archeological findings from the 1990s suggested there was possible prehistoric human activity by Micronesians prior to European discovery in the 16th century.

Several political entities associated with Oceania are still uninhabited, including Baker Island, Clipperton Island, Howland Island and Jarvis Island. There were brief attempts to settle Clipperton with Mexicans and Jarvis with Native Hawaiians in the early 20th century. The Jarvis settlers were relocated from the island due to Japanese advancements during World War II, while most of the settlers on Clipperton ended up dying from starvation and murdering one and other.

==== Australia ====
The first evident ethnic group to live in Australia were Aboriginal peoples, who have occupied the continent for more than 50,000 years. Torres Strait Islander peoples, culturally distinct but also First Nations Australians, have lived in the Torres Strait region for thousands of years. Europeans, primarily from England, first arrived in 1770 when Captain James Cook charted the east coast.

The 2016 Census shows that after Australia, the most common countries of birth were England and New Zealand. The proportion of people born in China and India increased between 2011 and 2016 (China from 6% to 8%, India from 5.6% to 7.4%). The proportion identifying as being of Aboriginal or Torres Strait Islander origin rose from 2.5% of the Australian population in 2011 to 2.8% in 2016.

== See also ==
- Ancestor
- Diaspora
- Ethnic cleansing
- Ethnic interest group
- Ethnic flag
- Ethnic penalty
- Ethnocultural empathy
- Ethnocide
- Ethnographic group
- Genealogy
- Genetic genealogy
- Human Genome Diversity Project
- Identity politics
- Ingroups and outgroups
- Intersectionality
- List of contemporary ethnic groups
- List of countries by ethnic groups
- List of Indigenous peoples
- Meta-ethnicity
- Minzu (anthropology)
- National symbol
- Passing (sociology)
- Polyethnicity
- Population genetics
- Race and ethnicity in censuses
- Race and ethnicity in the United States census
- Race and health
- Stateless nation
- Y-chromosome haplogroups in populations of the world
