= Carole Joffe =

American sociologist

Carole E. Joffe
- Education: University of California, Berkeley
- Scientific career
- Fields: sociologist
- Workplaces: University of California, Davis; Advancing New Standards in Reproductive Health

Carole E. Joffe is an American sociologist and reproductive rights advocate who has published several books on abortion. In 2013, she was awarded the Society of Family Planning Lifetime Achievement Award for her research on the sociology of abortion and family planning. She has also earned the UC Davis Public Service Award (2006), the Irwin Kushner Lecture by the Association of Reproductive Health Professionals (2010), and the David Gunn Lifetime Achievement Award from the Abortion Care Network (2015). Joffe serves on the faculty advisory board of the Berkeley Center for Right-Wing Studies.

== Life ==
Joffe earned her Ph.D. from the University of California, Berkeley.

She is a professor emerita at the University of California, Davis, and currently a professor of obstetrics, gynecology, and reproductive sciences at ANSIRH (Advancing New Standards in Reproductive Health), part of the University of California, San Francisco.

== Publications ==
- Friendly Intruders: Childcare Professionals and Family Life (1977)
- The Regulation of Sexuality: Experiences of Family Planning Workers (1986)
- Doctors of Conscience: The Struggle to Provide Abortion before and after Roe v Wade (1996)
- Dispatches from the Abortion Wars: The Costs of Fanaticism to Doctors, Patients and the Rest of Us (2009)
