= Ethnonational group =

Group unified by ethnicity and national identity

An ethnonational group or ethno-national group is a group that is unified by both a common ethnicity and national identity (or political identity), that asserts historic claims to a territorial homeland. Recently, scholars have begun to use this term to refer to groups that are entitled to self-determination. An ethnonational group is different from an ethnic group, as an ethnic group can only be considered an ethnonational group if it is large enough and willing to constitute a nation state. An ethnonational group is often the largest group in a nation, that carries its national language and culture, although it can also form a sizeable minority in another state. According to political philosopher Will Kymlicka, ethnonational groups are groups that formerly had their own states historically, but now find themselves as a minority group within a larger state, often due to military conquest, annexation or unification with another state.

== See also ==
- Ethnic group
- Nation
- Ethnolinguistic group
- Ethnoreligious group
- Minzu (anthropology), a term used in the Chinese character culture, may mean "nation" and "ethnic group".
