= Berkeley Center for Right-Wing Studies =

Research center at the University of California

Coordinates: 37.8719°N 122.2582°W

Berkeley Center for Right Wing Studies
- Established: March 2009
- Chair: Lawrence Rosenthal
- Location: University of California, Berkeley, Berkeley, California, United States
- Website: crws.berkeley.edu

The Berkeley Center for Right-Wing Studies (CRWS) is an interdisciplinary academic research center at the University of California, Berkeley, focused on studies of right-wing politics. It is housed at the Institute for the Study of Societal Issues (ISSI). It was founded in 2009, originally as the Center for the Comparative Study of Right-Wing Movements.

The CRWS researches right-wing movements in the 20th and 21st centuries, and is one of the first institutions in the United States dedicated to scholarly research and analysis of right-wing politics and movements.

== Mission ==
The CRWS was founded in 2009 and describes itself as having two missions: "first, to identify right-wing movements, flesh out their twentieth-century histories (how they aligned and how they survived) while isolating their novel aspects in the 21st century; and second, to develop and apply principles of how right-wing thought, ideology and organizational capacities operate to understand the state of the contemporary Right and identify its likely directions and successes."

The founding of the CRWS has been described by its founder, Lawrence Rosenthal, as being motivated by the diversification of right-wing movements after the Cold War, and because the center feels it is an understudied area. Its research focuses on the past hundred years and likely future directions of right-wing movements, and studies these movements and ideologies across history and transnationally. Its activities and programs include "publishing research findings, organizing working groups for faculty and graduate students, offering mini-grants to support undergraduate and graduate student research, providing fellowships and training opportunities to Berkeley students, and planning conferences, colloquia, and other public events" to support its mission.

The CRWS also publishes a journal, the Journal of Right-Wing Studies (JRWS). The CRWS and JRWS describe themselves as nonideological, and hope to influence "journalism, activism, and public policy."

The CRWS has been cited in The New York Times, ABC News, as well as the Huffington Post and the San Francisco Chronicle. "The extent in which we have become a kind of indispensable resource following things like the alt-right has been very significant," said Rosenthal.

== Funding ==
The CRWS was founded with a $777,000 anonymous donation in 2009. It is funded entirely by private donations.

In response to an email from The Daily Californian, a UC Berkeley student newspaper, Lawrence Rosenthal said the donations vary in size, and that "Most are from Cal alums. We also receive funding for specific projects from foundations and non-profit organizations."

== Programs ==
The CRWS supports interdisciplinary research on various facets of right-wing movements, ideologies, and actors in the U.S. and internationally. Its work includes operating a journal; the development and management of relevant archives; hosting symposia, conferences, and colloquia; and offering training and research opportunities to Berkeley students.

=== Archives ===
The CRWS is actively building a multimedia archive of audio, video, and print materials on the right-wing, and makes these materials available to scholars and the public.

As of 2024, this includes:

- John Birch Society and Related Audio and Visual Recordings
- a Bibliography of academic theses and dissertations on the American right-wing
- a FBI FOIA archive of radical right-wing groups and individuals
- a collection of KKK newspapers
- Ephemera and recordings of conservatives from People For the American Way, a progressive advocacy group founded by Norman Lear

=== Student Engagement ===
The CRWS "offers mini-grants, fellowships and training opportunities to Berkeley students." This has included work creating and maintaining the above archives through undergraduate work. Then senior Hollis Potts worked on "digitization of a variety of FBI materials, including memos, newsletters and pamphlets" and, then junior Kelly Jones worked on a proposal to "summarize and catalog rare audio and visual recordings from the John Birch Society" in 2018.

=== Journal ===
The Journal of Right-Wing Studies (JRWS) is an open access academic journal operated by UC Berkeley's Center for Right-Wing Studies.

== People ==
The Center for Right-Wing Studies is chaired by Lawrence Rosenthal, and its Faculty Advisory Board is composed of Paola Bacchetta, Troy Duster, Carole Joffe, Michael Omi, William Russell Ellis, and Kim Voss.
