= Michael Omi =

American sociologist

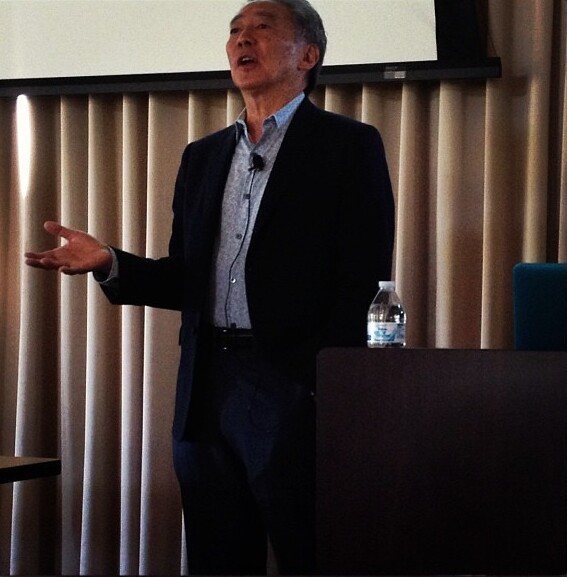
- Omi in 2013
- Born: 1951 (age 74–75); Berkeley, California, U.S.
- Education: University of California, Berkeley, University of California, Santa Cruz
- Occupations: Sociologist, writer, scholar, educator
- Known for: Asian American studies, race theory, antiracist scholarship

Michael Omi (born 1951) is an American sociologist, writer, scholar, and educator. Omi has served on the faculty at the University of California, Berkeley. He is the associate director of the Haas Institute for a Fair and Inclusive Society. Omi is best known for developing the theory of racial formation along with Howard Winant. Omi's work includes race theory, Asian American studies, and antiracist scholarship. Omi sits on the faculty advisory board of the Berkeley Center for Right-Wing Studies.

== Early life and education ==
Michael Omi was born in 1951 in Berkeley, California into a Japanese-American family; and was raised in the Fillmore District, Western Addition and Richmond District neighborhoods in San Francisco.

Omi holds a B.A. degree (1973) in sociology from the University of California, Berkeley; as well as a M.A. degree and Ph.D. in sociology from the University of California, Santa Cruz.

== Racial formation in the United States ==
Omi's most influential work has been his 1986 collaboration with University of California, Santa Barbara professor Howard Winant, Racial Formation in the United States. The theory draws upon Gramsci's conception of hegemony to describe the social construction of the race concept in contemporary US society. Omi and Winant argue that race emerged as an organizing factor in society due to political actions they call racial projects. These racial projects remain ongoing making race an unstable social category which is constantly changing as evidenced by the changing nature of race relations and as the result of political actions such as the Civil Rights Movement. Still, as Gramsci would predict, the reforms secured during crisis moments like the Civil Rights era serve merely to incorporate resistance. The political project of racial equality remains incomplete. Thus, the fundamental dynamics of race including institutional racism and continued inequality along racialized lines remain in place today, according to Omi and Winant.

Racial formation has solidified as one of the primary paradigms of sociological understandings of race. Omi and Winant identify reductionist theories of race that identify race as epiphenomenal rather than durable as the chief competing theories of racial dynamics in contemporary sociology.

== Key publications ==
- Racial Formation in the United States (with Howard Winant) (New York and London: Routledge, 1986; Second Edition, 1994).
- "The Changing Meaning of Race," in Neil Smelser, William Julius Wilson, and Faith Mitchell, editors, America Becoming: Racial Trends and Their Consequences ( Washington, D.C. : National Academy Press, 2001).
- "(E)racism: Emerging Practices of Antiracist Organizations," in Birgit Brander Rasmussen, Eric Klinenberg, Irene J. Nexica, and Matt Wray, editors, The Making and Unmaking of Whiteness (Durham: Duke University Press, 2001).
- "'Who Are You Calling Asian?': Shifting Identity Claims, Racial Classifications, and the Census," (with Yen Espiritu) in Paul M. Ong, ed., The State of Asian Pacific America : Transforming Race Relations ( Los Angeles : LEAP Asian Pacific American Public Policy Institute and UCLA Asian American Studies Center, 2000 ).
