= Howard Winant =

American sociologist (born 1946)

- Born: 1946 (age 79–80)
- Education: Brandeis University (BA); University of California, Santa Cruz (PhD)
- Occupations: Researcher, professor, writer
- Children: 3
- Writing career
- Period: 1980–present
- Notable awards: Cox-Johnson-Frazier Award “...for lifetime career service and commitment to greater racial and social justice,” American Sociological Association, 2015; Oliver Cromwell Cox Book Award, for The World Is a Ghetto. Section on Racial and Ethnic Minorities, American Sociological Association, 2003.
- Website: www.soc.ucsb.edu/faculty/howard-winant

Howard Winant (born 1946) is an American sociologist and race theorist. Winant is Distinguished Professor of Sociology at the University of California, Santa Barbara. Winant is best known for developing the theory of racial formation along with Michael Omi. Winant's research and teachings revolve around race and racism, comparative historical sociology, political sociology, social theory, and human rights.

== Education and career ==
Howard Winant was born in 1946, in the United States. He received his B.A. degree from Brandeis University in 1968; and Ph.D from the University of California, Santa Cruz in 1980. He has worked and taught in Mexico, Brazil, and Argentina.

Winant is Professor of Sociology at the University of California, Santa Barbara since 2002; where he is also affiliated with the Black Studies, Chicana/o Studies, and Asian American Studies departments.

== Racial Formation in the United States ==
Winant's most influential work has been his ongoing collaboration with UC Berkeley Professor Michael Omi, Racial Formation in the United States (1986–2015). The theory draws upon Gramsci's conception of hegemony to describe the social construction of the race concept in contemporary US society. Noting the concept's origins in European settler colonialism and in the enslavement of Africans (see Slavery in the United States), Omi and Winant also follow W. E. B. Du Bois in arguing that race has always operated as an organizing factor in society. In their account the meaning of race is constantly contested through political conflict that takes the form of racial projects. Racial projects are at work throughout society, making race an unstable social category that is embedded in all identities and social structures. Taking the form of White Supremacy and shaped as well by ongoing resistance to it, race has been so foundational in the United States that it serves as a "template" for all social conflict. At key moments like the Civil War and Reconstruction period, and during the Civil Rights Movement, the meaning and sociopolitical structure of race has been transformed. Still, as both Gramsci and Du Bois would predict, the reforms secured during crisis periods like the Civil Rights era have contradictory effects: for democratic and egalitarian movements, they simultaneously represent both victory and defeat. Civil Rights, Black Power, Immigrants Rights, and other anti-racist movements have both extended democracy and demobilized resistance. Political project seeking racial equality and justice remain incomplete and are indeed threatened by racial reaction in numerous ways. Thus, the fundamental dynamics of race, such as institutional racism, nativism (anti-immigrant racism), heterophobia, and enforced inequality along racialized lines remain formidable today, constantly subject to political struggle, according to Omi and Winant.

Racial formation has solidified as one of the primary paradigms of sociological understandings of race. While recognizing the importance of ethnicity- (culturally-based theories), class- (inequality-based theories), and nation- (peoplehood-based theories), race cannot be explained a manifestation of any of these three categories. Omi and Winant criticize any attempt to do so as inherently reductionist. In their view race remains a fundamental dimension of social structure and signification, while simultaneously retaining its instability, contrariety, and openness, because it is always engulfed in the turmoil of political conflict.

== University of California Center for New Racial Studies ==
Winant was the founder and director of the University of California Center for New Racial Studies, a multidisciplinary program that was active on all ten UC campuses of the UC from 2010 to 2015. The UCCNRS was not renewed in 2015, for reasons that remain unclear.

== Key publications ==
- "Pan-Americanism and Anti-Racism." In Hooker, Juliet, ed. Black and Indigenous Resistance in the Americas: From Multiculturalism to Racist Backlash. Lexington Books, 2020.
- Paola Bacchetta, Sunaina Maira, and Howard Winant, editors. Global Raciality: Empire, Postcoloniality, Decoloniality. Routledge, 2018.
- "World-Historical Du Bois." Ethnic and Racial Studies Review, Vol. 40, no. 3 (February 2017).
- Racial Formation In The United States, (co-author: Michael Omi) (Routledge 1986; 2nd ed. 1994; 3rd ed., 2015).
- "The Dark Matter: Race and Racism in the 21st-Century." Critical Sociology, Vol 41, no. 2 (March 2015).
- "Interview: Howard Winant." In Katy Sian, ed. Conversations in Postcolonial Thought. Palgrave/MacMillan, 2014.
- "The Dark Side of the Force: One Hundred Years of the Sociology of Race.” In Craig Calhoun, ed. Sociology in America: A History University of Chicago Press, 2007.
- "Race and Racism: Toward a Global Future." In Ethnic and Racial Studies, Vol. 29. no. 5 (Sept. 2006).
- "Teaching Race and Racism in the 21st Century: Thematic Considerations." In Souls: A Critical Journal of Black Politics, Culture, and Society (Institute for Research in African American Studies, Columbia University), Vol. 6, nos. 3-4 (2004).
- The New Politics of Race. University of Minnesota Press 2004.
- The World Is a Ghetto: Race and Democracy Since World War II. Basic Books 2001.
- "Race in the New Millennium," ColorLines: Race Culture, Action Vol. 3, no. 1 (Spring 2000).
- Racial Conditions: Politics, Theory, Comparisons. University of Minnesota Press 1994.
- "Behind Blue Eyes: Contemporary White Racial Politics," New Left Review 225 (September–October 1997).
