= Socialist ideology of the Kuomintang =

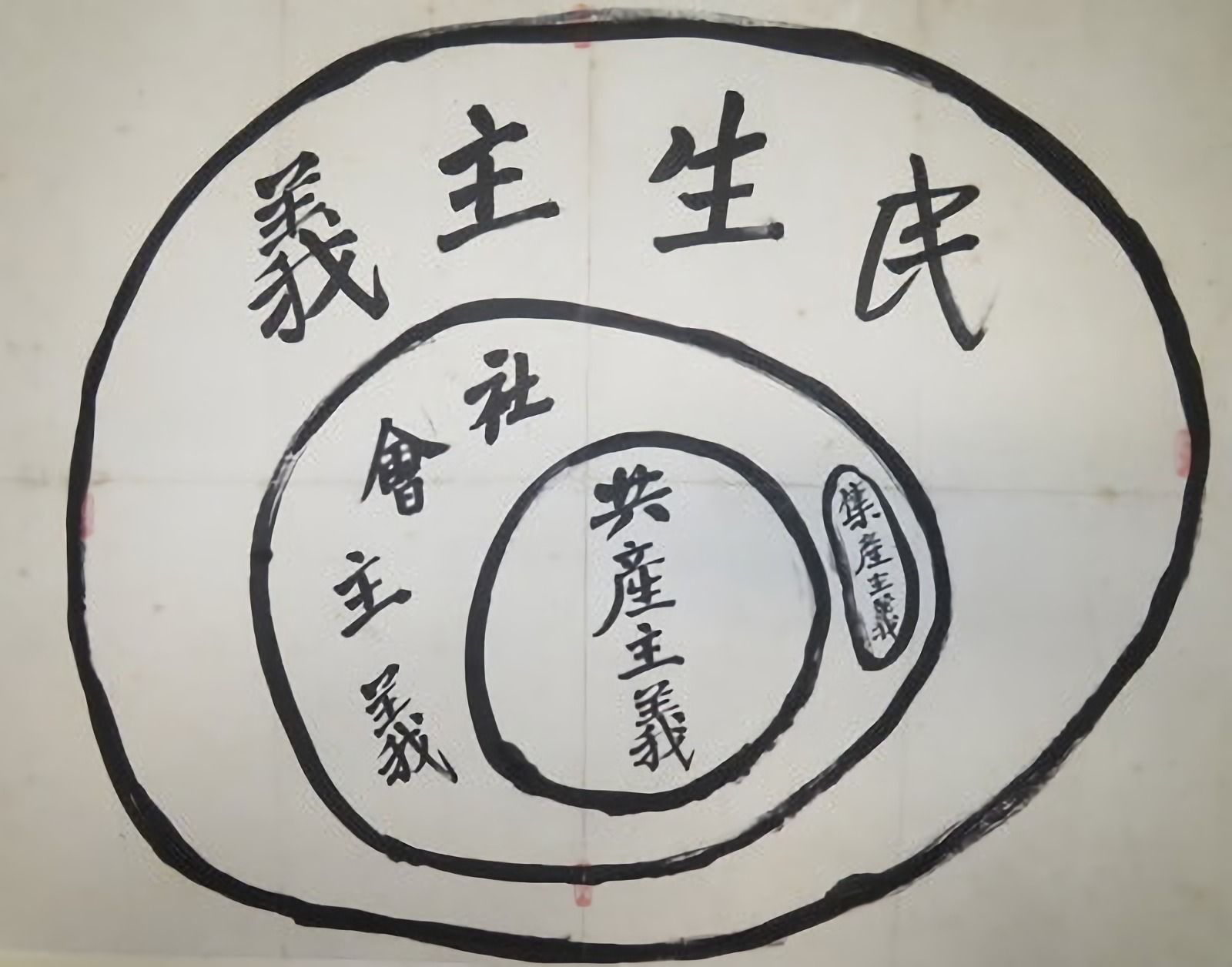
Sun Yat-sen's sketch of the doctrine of Mínshēng (Welfare Rights), arguing both socialism and communism are subsets of the doctrine.

The historical Kuomintang socialist ideology is a form of socialist thought developed in mainland China during the early Republic of China. The Tongmenghui revolutionary organization led by Sun Yat-sen was the first to promote socialism in China.

== Organizations ==
The Tongmenghui and its successor, the Kuomintang, were one of the first political groups to develop socialist ideology in China.

== History ==
One of the Three Principles of the People of the Kuomintang, Minsheng, was defined as the People's Livelihood by Sun Yat-sen. The concept may be understood as social welfare as well. Sun understood it as an industrial economy and equality of land holdings for the Chinese peasant farmers. Here he was influenced by the American thinker Henry George (see Georgism) and British thinker Bertrand Russell; the land value tax in Taiwan is a legacy thereof. He divided livelihood into four areas: food, clothing, housing, and transportation; and planned out how an ideal Chinese government can take care of these for its people.

The Kuomintang was referred to having a socialist ideology. "Equalization of land rights" was a clause Sun included in the original Tongmenghui. The Kuomintang's revolutionary ideology in the 1920s incorporated unique Chinese socialism as part of its ideology.

The Soviet Union trained Kuomintang revolutionaries in the Moscow Sun Yat-sen University. In the West and in the Soviet Union, Chiang Kai-shek was known as the "Red General". Movie theaters in the Soviet Union showed newsreels and clips of Chiang. At Moscow Sun Yat-sen University, portraits of Chiang were hung on the walls. In the Soviet May Day parades in 1927, Chiang's portrait was to be carried along with the portraits of Karl Marx, Vladimir Lenin, Joseph Stalin and other socialist leaders.

The Kuomintang attempted to levy taxes on merchants in Canton and the merchants resisted by raising an army, the Merchant's Volunteer Corps. The merchants were conservative and reactionary, and appointed Chen Lianbao, a prominent comprador trader, as leader of the Volunteer Corps. The merchants' Corps accused the Kuomintang of leading a "Red Revolution" in Canton. Sun initiated this anti-merchant policy and Chiang enforced it by leading his army of Whampoa Military Academy graduates against the merchants' Corps. Chiang was assisted in his campaign by Soviet advisors, who supplied him with weapons. The merchants' Volunteer Corps were supplied with weapons from the Western countries. The merchants were supported by the foreign, Western imperialists such as the British, who led an international flotilla to support them against Sun. Chiang, in battling the Corps, seized the western-supplied weapons from the merchants. A Kuomintang general executed several merchants, and the Kuomintang formed a Soviet-inspired Revolutionary Committee. The Communist Party of Great Britain congratulated Sun for his war against foreign imperialists and capitalists.

Even after Chiang turned on the Soviet Union and massacred the communists, he still continued anti-capitalist activities and promoting revolutionary thought, accusing the merchants of being reactionaries and counter-revolutionaries.

The United States consulate and other westerners in Shanghai was concerned about the approach of "Red General" Chiang as his army was seizing control in the Northern Expedition.

Chiang also confronted and dominated the merchants of Shanghai in 1927, seizing loans from them, with the threats of death or exile. Rich merchants, industrialists, and entrepreneurs were arrested by Chiang, who accused them of being "counterrevolutionary", and Chiang held them until they gave money to the Kuomintang. Chiang's arrests also targeted rich millionaires, accusing them of communism and counterrevolutionary activities. Chiang also enforced an anti-Japanese boycott, sending his agents to sack the shops of those who sold Japanese made items, fining them. Chiang also disregarded the Internationally protected International Settlement, putting cages on its borders, threatening to have the merchants placed in there. He terrorized the merchant community. The Kuomintang's alliance with the Green Gang allowed it to ignore the borders of the foreign concessions.

The Kuomintang repeatedly attempted land reform in China. On 8 January 1933, Chiang Kai-Shek established the Chinese Institute of Land Economics, under the 1932 "Ten Principles for promoting Party Land Policy", to "Regulate land ownership rights", "Establish a system of equal land rights", "Advance land use", "Establish land governance organisations", to facilitate land redistribution. United States Ambassador Patrick Hurley declared that the difference between the Communists and Nationalists were no greater than those between the Republican and Democratic parties in the United States.

In 1948, a new currency was introduced, the Gold Yuan, purchaseable for gold or silver. Information was leaked and there was a wave of chaos from speculation. The Kuomintang again curbed the merchants of Shanghai, and Chiang sent his son Chiang Ching-kuo to restore economic order. Ching-kuo copied Soviet methods which he learned during his stay there to start a social revolution by targeting middle class merchants. He also enforced low prices on all goods to raise support from the proletariat. This however caused a hoarding frenzy.

The value of the Yuan plunged and many became destitute. As riots broke out and savings were ruined, bankrupting shop owners, Ching-kuo began to pursue the wealthy, seizing assets and placing them under arrest. The son of the gangster Du Yuesheng was arrested by him. Ching-kuo ordered Kuomintang agents to raid the Yangtze Development Corporation's warehouses, which was privately owned by H. H. Kung and his family. H. H. Kung's wife was Soong Ai-ling, the sister of Soong Mei-ling who was Ching-kuo's stepmother. H. H. Kung's son David was arrested, the Kung's responded by blackmailing the Chiangs, threatening to release information about them, eventually he was freed after negotiations, and Ching-kuo resigned, ending the terror on the Shanghainese merchants.

General Ma Bufang, the Kuomintang Muslim Governor of Qinghai, was described as a socialist by American journalist John Roderick.

An American scholar and government advisor, A. Doak Barnett, praised Ma Bufang's government as "one of the most efficient in China, and one of the most energetic. While most of China is bogged down, almost inevitably, by Civil War, Chinghai is attempting to carry out small-scale, but nevertheless ambitious, development and reconstruction schemes on its own initiative".

General Ma started a state run and controlled industrialization project, directly creating educational, medical, agricultural, and sanitation projects, run or assisted by the state. The state provided money for food and uniforms in all schools, state run or private. Roads and a theater were constructed. The state controlled all the press, no freedom was allowed for independent journalists. His regime was dictatorial in its political system. Barnett admitted that the regime had "stern authoritarianism" and "little room for personal freedom".

== Ideology ==
The Kuomintang also promotes government-owned corporations, and its founder, Sun Yat-sen, was heavily influenced by the economic ideas of Henry George, who believed that the rents extracted from natural monopolies or the usage of land belonged to the public. Sun argued for Georgism and emphasized the importance of a mixed economy, which he termed "The Principle of Minsheng" in his Three Principles of the People: "The railroads, public utilities, canals, and forests should be nationalized, and all income from the land and mines should be in the hands of the State. With this money in hand, the State can therefore finance the social welfare programs."

Ma Hongkui, the Kuomintang Muslim Governor of Ningxia, promoted state-owned monopoly companies. His government's Fu Ning Company had a monopoly over commercial and industry in Ningxia. The Chinese Muslim 36th Division (National Revolutionary Army) governed southern Xinjiang from 1934 to 1937. Muslim General Ma Hushan was chief of the 36th Division. The Chinese Muslims operated state-owned carpet factories. Corporations such as CSBC Corporation, Taiwan, CPC Corporation, Taiwan and Aerospace Industrial Development Corporation are owned by the state in the Republic of China.

The Kuomintang government under Sun and Chiang denounced feudalism as counterrevolutionary and proudly proclaimed itself to be revolutionary. Chiang called the warlords feudalists and called for feudalism and counterrevolutionaries to be stamped out by the Kuomintang. Chiang showed extreme rage when he was called a warlord because of its negative, feudal connotations.

Marxists also existed in the Kuomintang and viewed revolution in different terms from the CCP by claiming that China has already gone past its feudal stage and in a stagnation period, rather than in another mode of production. These Marxists in the Kuomintang did not always agree with the ideology of the Chinese Communist Party. The Left Kuomintang who disagreed with Chiang Kai-shek formed the Revolutionary Committee of the Chinese Kuomintang, and later joined the government of the CCP.

== Implementation ==
=== Chiang Kai-shek ===
Contrary to the view that he was pro-capitalist, Chiang Kai-shek behaved in an antagonistic manner to the capitalists of Shanghai, often attacking them and confiscating their capital and assets for the use of the government, even while he was fighting the communists.

Chiang crushed pro-communist worker and peasant organizations and the rich Shanghai capitalists at the same time. Chiang continued Sun's anti-capitalist ideology; Kuomintang media openly attacked the capitalists and capitalism, demanding government-controlled industry instead. The KMT established a large bureaucratic technostructure for managing its many state-owned enterprises, which attracted heavy criticism from foreign businesses due to the vast government monopolies and negative treatment of foreign competitors.

Chiang blocked the capitalists from gaining any political power or voice in his regime. Once Chiang was done with his original rampage and "reign of terror" on pro-communist laborers, he proceeded to turn on the capitalists. Gangster connections allowed Chiang to attack them in the International Settlement, to force capitalists to back him up with their assets for his military expenditures.

== Support ==
Revolutionary and communist leader Vladimir Lenin praised Sun Yat-sen and the Kuomintang for their ideology and principles. Lenin praised Sun, his attempts on social reformation and congratulated him for fighting foreign imperialism. Sun also returned the praise, calling him a "great man" and sent his congratulations on the revolution in Russia.

== See also ==
- Socialism with Chinese characteristics
- Ideology of the Chinese Communist Party
- Dang Guo
- Leninism
- Democratic centralism (Kuomintang)
